= Thuis =

Belgian television soap opera series

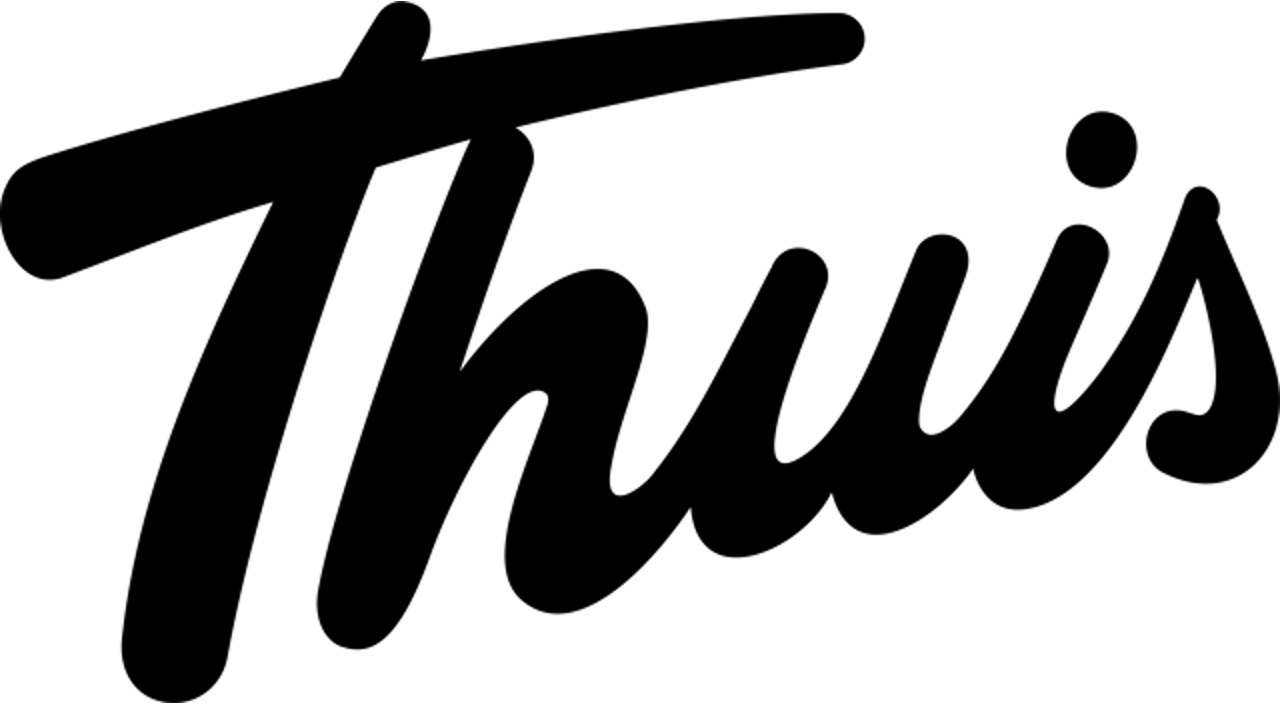
- Genre: Soap opera
- Created by: Luc Beerten; Winnie Enghien; Jan Matterne Jr.; Paul Schellekens
- Written by: Luc Beerten; Willy Coomans; Winnie Enghien; Paul Schellekens; Anton Klee; Wout Thielemans; Bart Cooreman; Ludwig Dierinckx; Eddy Kindermans; Jan Lampo; Myriam Augustijnen; Knarf Van Pellecom; Michel Sabbe; Guy Bernaert; Tine Deboosere; Luc Gadisseur; Marinelle De Winne; Mathias Claeys; Nathalie Haspeslagh; Jan Matterne; Jan Matterne Jr.; Annette Duchateau; Annelies Lafleur; Rita Bossaer; Bob Goossens; Luc Vancampenhout; Noël Degeling; Filip Vanluchene; Hilde Pallen; Steve De Wilde; Eline Durt; Yves Caspar; Kaat van Eijndhoven; Lore Clerix; Ilke Brassine; Stef Wouters; Laura Van Passel; Piet Baete; Bjorn Van den Eynde; Jasmien Vandermeeren; Laura Deriemaeker; Jonas Boets; Sara Theunynck; Tom Vermeyen; Arne De Loore; Karolien Cammaerts; Gregory F. Clerckx
- Screenplay by: Jan Matterne Jr.; Mathias Claeys; Luc Vancampenhout; Annelies Lafleur; Luc Gadisseur; Knarf Van Pellecom; Michel Sabbe; Heidi Hermans; Marleen Barras
- Story by: Jan Matterne Jr.; Annelies Lafleur; Willy Coomans
- Directed by: Paul Schellekens; Georges terryn; Willy Vanduren; Pieter Raes; Dirk Corthout; Toon Slembrouck; Koen Verweirder; Marnik Willems; Guy Thys; Nicole Pellegroms; Louis Welters; Lars Goeyvaerts; Tom Goris; Merlina Van Berlo; Pieter Goethals; Rik Daniëls; Kim Keith Van Oeteren; Maarten Vandeweerd; Ivo Chiang; Peter Rondou; Ine Goormans; Bruno Van Heystraeten; Mark De Geest; Dominik Vanheusden; Hendrik Moonen; David Verhaeghe; Pietje Horsten; Noël Degeling; Serge Bierset; Michelle Graus; Peter Gorsten; Wenda Giampiccolo; Douglas Boswell; Leontien Hufkens; Johan Gevers; Stef Desmyter; Anne Ingelbrecht; Koen Vermeiren; Marianne Devriese; Yannick Bruynincx; Lien Willaert
- Creative directors: Louis Welters; Dirk Corthout; Guy Thys; Rik Daniëls; Kim Keith Van Oeteren
- Starring: see Current cast and Former cast
- Theme music composer: Bart Ketelaere; David Baeck
- Opening theme: Daar is thuis; Je bent thuis; Nergens beter dan thuis; Je bent thuis; Ik ben thuis; Bij jou voel ik me thuis
- Composers: Barton Kaye; Georges De Decker; Steve Willaert
- Country of origin: Belgium
- Original language: Dutch
- No. of seasons: 32
- No. of episodes: 6,324 (25 June 2027)

Production
- Executive producers: Paul Schellekens; Elvira Kleynen; Anke Mouton; Luc Roggen; Peter Bouckaert
- Producers: Winnie Enghien; Karin Baert; Marleen Baras; Luc Roggen; Elvira Kleynen; Paul Schellekens; Anke Mouton; Dirk Haegemans; Wim Janssen; Hans Roggen; Ilse Polenus; Elke Brabants; Astrid Talemans; Wendy Ingelrelst; Riet De Prins; Chantal Van Braband; Koen Verweirder; Karin Meulemans; Els Verhaeghe
- Cinematography: Philippe Van Horebeek; Gui Bernaerts; Marc Moyson
- Editors: Ludwig Schrijvers; Marc Croes; Fabienne Cuyvers; Firmin van Hoeck; Gunther Mertens; Michel Vanderhaeghen; Johan Botte; Els Crommelynck; Wim Heirman; Kristl Leskens; Jan Tratsaert; Eric Van De Sijpe; Mark Verschraegen; Wim Stuyck; Peter Mertens
- Running time: 25–30 minutes, pilot 50 minutes, seasonfinale 45–60 minutes
- Production company: Eyeworks (2023–)

Original release
- Network: VRT 1
- Release: 23 December 1995 – present

Thuis (English: At Home) is a Belgian television soap opera, which airs on VRT 1, which is in the hands of VRT, the national broadcasting channel of the Dutch-speaking region of Belgium, Flanders. Until 2023 VRT produced the series but due to general cost savings it was decided in 2022 Eyeworks will take over the series.

Thuis first aired on 23 December 1995, featuring Pol Goossen, Janine Bischops, Merel De Vilder Robier, Sally-Jane Van Horenbeeck, Annick Segal, Monika Van Lierde, Rik Andries and the late Donald Madder.

Thuis grew to become Flanders' number one soap, gaining 900,000 viewers (compared to the highest rated TV show, receives 1.5 million viewers), and therefore beating competing for channel vtm's soap operas Familie (English: Family) and former series Wittekerke (English: White Church, a fictional town). Thuis is currently in its 32nd season, and has aired 6,194 episodes as of 25 December 2026.

== Plot ==
=== Season 1 ===
After Jenny Verbeeck discovers that her husband, Frank Bomans, has cheated on her again — this time with Simonne Backx — she and their daughter Bianca move into the mansion of Dr. Walter Dedecker. Walter lives there with his two children: Dr. Ann and Tom, a law student with a reckless lifestyle. Walter also serves as the chairman of the board of an elderly care home. He uncovers that the home's director, Karel Briers, holds shares in a pharmaceutical company owned by Vergucht, which sells overpriced medication to the facility. Even worse: the drugs are being swapped out, turning the residents into unwitting test subjects. Ann is in a relationship with John De Brabander until she learns he is married. Devastated, she attempts suicide and later leaves for Italy indefinitely. Although Walter is still married to Marianne Bastiaens, they live separately. Marianne visits often, and the couple has chosen not to divorce due to inheritance matters. Walter falls for Rosa Verbeeck, but during a trip to Paris, he realizes she is not his true love and begins a brief romance with Jenny. Rosa disapproves of her daughter Peggy's first boyfriend, Bennie De Taeye, a homeless drug addict. Later, Peggy becomes involved with Robbe. Together with Tom and Steven, Robbe launches a student bike rental project. They collaborate with Ingrid Michiels, an advertising designer married to sculptor Harry Moeyaerts. The project never was a success. Amongst others a nearly-failure was after Steven secretly convinces Vergucht to sponsor it. The project ultimately stopped when the owner of the storage facility withdrew. After the sudden death of her partner Pierre, Florke moves in with her son Frank. She is determined to save Frank and Jenny's marriage and get rid of Simonne, but eventually changes her mind. Bianca starts dating Neil Feyaerts, who later rapes her and is imprisoned for drug dealing. She moves to Groningen to continue her studies. Luc Bomans, who runs a sweet shop in New York, returns to Belgium for a two-week visit after disappearing 19 years earlier. He hides the fact that he and his girlfriend have split and that he plans to stay in Belgium. Frank is still bitter about Luc's departure, especially since Luc withdrew 200,000 Belgian Francs from their plumbing business, causing Frank to go bankrupt shortly afterward. Earlier in the series, Frank lost his job due to repeated absences caused by drinking. He was rehired after Simonne spoke with the owner, Robert Vercammen. Later, Frank loses his job again after welding the company's gate shut during a strike. Robert demands over 500,000 Belgian Francs in damages. Simonne then hints to Florke that she slept with Robert to get Frank rehired the first time — and is willing to do so again. Peggy begins searching for her biological father, but Rosa tries to sabotage her efforts. When Rosa discovers her sister is romantically involved with Walter, she suffers a nervous breakdown. Peggy suspects Luc is her father. Luc admits it's possible, but Rosa must confirm. In the season finale, Rosa, overwhelmed by her emotions, reveals that Frank Bomans is actually Peggy's father. Frank learns about Simonne's affair with Robert Vercammen. Although Simonne denies it, Frank strikes Vercammen on the head, leaving him motionless.

=== Season 2 ===
Robert Vercammen is hospitalized with a skull fracture and falls into a coma. News leaks about Peggy's biological father. Several people seek revenge: Luc, who blames Frank for “taking his Leontien,” gives a false statement to the police about what really happened when Frank struck Robert. Leontien, Robert's daughter, is also bitter, as she once had a relationship with Frank, which he ended in favor of Jenny. Jenny, in turn, demands substantial alimony and the buyout of the house. Luc later reconsiders his revenge after discovering that Robert is faking amnesia to extort money from Frank in court. However, this cannot be proven, as Robert dies in a car accident. Frank is sentenced to six months in prison but is released after four weeks due to overcrowding. Ann develops feelings for Lou Sevenants, owner of Ter Smissen — a horse riding school with a hotel brasserie — but discovers he is married to Veronique, a woman diagnosed with schizophrenia. Harry mentors Pieter-Jan, whose family is struggling financially. He trusts the boy until his apartment is ransacked and Pieter-Jan disappears. The stolen goods are later found hidden in the stables of Ter Smissen, and Benny turns out to be Pieter-Jan's accomplice. To destroy the evidence, Pieter-Jan sets the stables on fire but dies after locking himself inside. Benny cooperates with a police investigator to dismantle a drug gang in exchange for acquittal. Although the gang is taken down, the police break their promise and Benny is sent to prison. Tom becomes the manager of singer Rebecca, Benny's sister. In an attempt to boost her fame, he leaks a provocative photo from her past as a stripper to the press. Florke begins a relationship with Roger, a wealthy man. Meanwhile, Harry and Ingrid struggle to conceive. Ingrid blames herself due to a past abortion, until Harry discovers his sperm quality is poor. This revelation causes a crisis in their relationship. Ingrid begins an affair with François Chevalier, a hotel manager, and becomes pregnant. Charles Bastiaens — also known as Carlos — returns from Belize. He is HIV-positive and wants to reconnect with his children Sarah and Frederik. However, his ex-wife Marijke has raised them under the lie that her current husband is their biological father. Tom devises a plan allowing Carlos to see his children before flying back to Belize. Ann decides to join him on vacation. Marianne and Walter go on a romantic weekend to the Belgian coast, where Walter suffers a brain hemorrhage and dies. Rosa inherits his cottage in the Ardennes and a valuable family necklace, sparking a long-standing feud between her and Marianne. Luc returns to the United States to sell his shares in the sweet shop, but once there, he calls Rosa to say he'll stay much longer than planned. Peggy finds a job at Club Med as a horse riding instructor and moves together with Robbe to Barcelona. In the season finale, Neil rapes Bianca again in a room at Ter Smissen. Her screams are heard by Jenny, who rushes upstairs and breaks into the room. Frank — repairing an underground water pipe in the stables — also runs upstairs. Neil is knocked unconscious and lies on the floor with a serious head injury.

=== Season 3 ===
Neil was beaten to death with a blunt object by Jenny. She and Frank bury the body in the trench of the underground water pipe. It turns out that Veronique had psychological issues before she met Lou, and at one point she even stabbed her brother with a knife. A few years earlier, Veronique gave birth to a stillborn child because Lou did not respond properly when she told him she no longer felt the baby moving in her womb. Since then, she has blamed Lou for everything that goes wrong. Her mental condition deteriorates further: she kills a cat and even tries to kill Lou using Haldol. After this last incident, Lou wants a divorce and chooses a life with Ann, and they move abroad. Werner starts working as a cook at Ter Smissen so he can take care of his sister Veronique. Veronique is declared “healthy” after receiving monthly injections, but her condition worsens again when Werner announces a few months later that he is leaving to return to his former job as a cook on a cruise ship.

Doctor André Van Goethem - formerly working for Médecins Sans Frontières - starts in the practice of Ann but moves back to Africa after receiving a letter from a befriended woman. This upsets Marianne who got in love with him.

Luc manages to sell his shares for six million Belgian francs, but the money is stolen by Bennie, who disappears. Police officer Fernand struggles to raise his three teenage children: Kristoff was caught during a burglary and takes ecstasy, Joeri had an accident with Frederik's borrowed moped and the two have been enemies ever since, and Eva is in a relationship with Frederik. After Fernand's father dies, he sells his houses, including the one Rosa rents for her hair salon. Marianne seizes the opportunity for revenge and buys the property, but due to Belgian law she cannot evict Rosa until the current lease expires. That's why Marianne starts all kinds of harassment, hoping Rosa will go bankrupt or decide to move out.

Gossip-loving Liliane has feelings for Fernand and starts working as his housekeeper, but he is not interested. Felicienne, Marianne's not-so-bright housekeeper, buys a worthless painting for 32,000 Belgian francs, but Harry discovers another painting underneath it, and that work appears to be worth some million Belgian francs.

Leontien makes a deal with François in a scheme involving illegal cigarettes. When customs get wind of it, François disappears without a trace. Tom reveals the truth about Frederik's and Sarah's biological father. Rebecca quits her job as a professional singer and starts working as a prostitute.

Ingrid gives birth to a daughter, Clio, but the child is kidnapped by a mentally ill woman. By coincidence, Veronique discovers the culprit. Harry and Ingrid rekindle their relationship.

When Frank finds out Simonne stopped with anticonception because she wants a child, he sneakily undergoes a vasectomy because he already has two grown-up children. Not much later it turns out Simonne got pregnant in between.

Neil's body is found, and Inspector Tibbex begins an investigation. The case is brought before the Court of Assizes. Peggy and Robbe return as she is a witness. She ends her relationship with Robbe due to amongst others his snobbery. Veronique undergoes hypnosis to remember what's happened on the night of the murder: her version matches. Veronique was in her room, she heard the cries of Bianca, Jenny went up to the stairs, tried to open the door, went downwards, yelled at Frank, went upwards, opened the door, there was stumbling, then all became quite, Frank arrived. Later on the evening, she saw Frank and Jenny carry a heavy sack. It also becomes clear why Veronique abandonded this memory: as child she was abused by her mother physically. Her mother locked herself up after the death of her husband and didn't take care of her children. She was even convinced her husband died of cardiac arrest due to Veronqiue. As an 8-year Veronique found her mother who committed suicide. The evening of the murder, she experienced the events that took place in past. Her testimony is being deleted at the request of the public prosecutor because the hypnosis was not carried out by a forensic doctor and the fact that Veronique mixes up both events. According to the prosecutor, the incident must be treated as premeditated murder: on the night of the killing, only Frank, Jenny, and Bianca were at Hof Ter Smissen. They discovered that Neil had booked a room. Bianca, Jenny, and Frank took the opportunity to kill Neil in his room, bury him in the trench, and destroy all evidence. The defense attorney manages to convince the jury that the prosecutor's entire story is based on unproven assumptions, and Frank, Jenny, and Bianca are acquitted.

=== Season 4 ===
(partial plot)

The season opens with a kind of epilogue: a party at Ter Smissen. A voice-over explains what happened between the end of the previous season and the present, which is set several months later. Simonne has given birth to a boy named Franky. Peggy has quit her job in Spain and has now a relationship with Kristoff. She started working again in the stables of Ter Smissen. Thanks to her testimony in court, Veronique has begun to process her childhood trauma. Tom has moved to London to continue his studies, while Dré has returned. In the previous season, Leontien signed an exclusive reseller partnership with "Antonio Vivaldi", an Italian company that produces designer bathroom furniture. Luc becomes the "Benelux managing director" of this new company, which is a subcompany of Vercammen. Luc can convince Frank to work for Vivaldi under his supervision. They and Leontien go to Italy to visit the factory. Frank goes to a Belgian pub which is owned by Bennie. Bennie bribes Frank with one million Belgian Franks to remain silent. With the money, Frank buys a Honda Gold Wing with sidecar which is stolen a few weeks later. Yves, a gallant man, starts working as hairdresser in the saloon of Rosa. Marianne meets Jean-Pierre De Ruyter, an antique dealer and former alcoholic, and they start a relation. Things got complicated because Rosa is also in love with him. Dré and Jean-Pierre know each other. Dré had a relationship with Jean-Pierre his sister but he left in favor of Médecins Sans Frontière. Jean-Pierre struggles with guilt feelings: several years ago he had a car accident when he was drunk: his wife did not survive and his daughter Marie is blind since then. Marie has not forgiven Jean-Pierre and takes any opportunity to bring him in discredit. She also haggles money from him as she is convinced he must pay for her treatment and life support. Kristoff is forced by his former youth gang to join them again: otherwise they reveal he is responsible for the death of a man during a burglary. There is a verbal agreement between Ingrid and Harry he becomes recognized as father. However, during a car ride, Ingrid has to swerve to avoid another car driven by Werner. As a result, Ingrid crashes into a canal and drowns, Clio can be saved. Werner's legs are temporarily paralyzed. Since the verbal agreement is not legally sufficient, the child is assigned to Ingrid's sister. That's why Harry fleeds away with Clio. Veronique becomes depressed again as she took care of Clio once in a while. She is convinced to get pregnant and seduces The relationship between Frank and Leontien worsens and she goes to Italy for some time. Meanwhile, Sanitair Vercammen is taken over by her uncle Gaston Vercammen which does not please Luc.

=== Season 11 ===
Following a long period of doubt, Robert Swerts is discovered to be the serial killer and rapist and is arrested. Renzo Fierens is arrested for drug dealing. Dr. Geert Smeekens replaces Michael Bastiaens in the doctor's office alongside Ann De Decker. Jenny Verbeeck – Van Goethem returns from the south of France, while Eva Verbist and Nandje Reimers leaves due to Nandje's leukemia.

=== Season 12 ===
Eva begins a relationship with Maarten who turns out to be just as jealous and obsessed as Jan, his brother and her late husband. He kills his mother, Mathilde, for poisoning Eva to prevent her leaving the country and for and killing his father who learned of this. Maarten also takes over the health business of Werner, his rival for Eva's affection. Femke discovers that Maarten is the culprit and warns Werner. However, Maarten restrains Eva in their home and sets it on fire so that he, Eva, and her son, Nandje, can be together in death.

=== Season 13 ===
This season saw the introduction of Sonja and Ludo De Backer, Dorien's parents. Later on this season, civil law notary Peter Vlerick, played by Geert Hunaerts, will be introduced as a Bastiaens family friend. Meanwhile, Lien Van de Kelder ended her three-episode guest appearance. However, she was slated to return as Sofie Bastiaens on 21 November 2007.

At the end of last season, Kristin Arras her character Mathilde Reimers was murdered and written out. She's the only character to disappear from the main cast from season 12. The characters introduced last season and part of the main cast, but not yet of the opening titles were all added to the opening titles. These were Viktor Corthout and Sandrine Verbeelen (first individual shots in intro in episode 3 of season 13), Dorien De Backer and Youssef Bakali (first individual shots in intro in episode 4 of season 13). Daisy a supporting character in season 12 was also added to the main cast and the opening titles (first individual shot in intro in episode 4 of season 13). It wasn't quite certain if she would play a more important role this season. Surprisingly, Julia was also added to the opening titles, and had her first individual shot in the intro in episode 2 of season 13. Julia only appeared in a few episodes of season 12 and was considered a guest character. She still has to appear this season.

It was announced in early 2007 that Marie Van Goethem played by Patsy Vandermeeren, Werner Van Sevenant played by Peter Van Asbrouck, Eva Verbist played by Nathalie Wijnants and Leontien Vercammen played by Marijke Hofkens will leave onscreen in 2007.

=== Season 14 ===
Eric and Martine's daughter Sofie is missing, last seen at a wedding. Her body is found and a police investigation begins. Nancy tries to reveal that Femke's new lover, Mike, is actually Femke's father. Mike tries to kill Nancy, and Femke suspects Mike is Sofie's killer. Mike stalks Femke and is fatally stabbed by Erik, who is absolved of murder. Femke later accepts an inheritance left by Mike and falls in love with Peter.

Leo makes a bad investment, defrauded by Mike, and Femke helps return the money. Dorien falls in love with classmate Jonas, threatening her marriage to Sam. Sam and Dorien move to Lanzarote to pursue her dream. Waldek falls for Kris who turns him down after a passionate weekend.

Peggy returns to have an abortion, but agrees for Ann to adopt the child. Jenny's daughter, Bianca, is to marry her young love, Tom De Decker. Tom arrives to donate a kidney to his ill mother, Marianne, and Peggy reveals that Tom is the father of her child, Sandrine. Not wishing to cause a break between Tom and Bianca, Peggy leaves. However, Bianca cancels the marriage plans and starts a relationship with Mo.

Waldek quits his job and Luc tells Rosa about the affair, so that she decides to divorce. Cois and Julia marry and depart for their honeymoon. Katrien and Paulien decide to throw a party but their father forbids it; they drug him and he falls into a coma.

=== Season 15 ===
There is a custody dispute as Tom and Peggy want to keep their baby. The court decides that Ann will be Sandrine's adoptive mother.

Eddy tries to prevent Jelena's deportation by faking a marriage, but is unsuccessful. She asks Waldek to try and they fall in love. When Joery learns, he asks Eddy to kill Waldek in a car accident, but Eddy ends up hitting Mo and Bianca.

Herman, an ex-lover of Simonne, arrives with his son, Bram, who is rebellious until Herman becomes sick. Simonne falls in love with Herman, who dies. She promises Herman to take care of Bram until he is an adult, but Frank is not pleased when Bram moves in.

=== Season 16 ===
Before his death, Herman tells Frank where his son Bram can find €50,000 of black-market money, but Frank keeps the money for himself. Franky and Simonne convince Frank to give Bram the money in stock, but a dispute causes Frank to change his mind and Bram stabs him. Franky claims responsibility and spends several weeks in youth prison. It is later revealed that Franky did this because he wants to be in a relationship with Bram, and Franky is disowned by his father for being gay.

Rosa distances herself from her ex-husband, Waldek, by pursuing Luc, and they become engaged. However, she feels pity for Waldek, who can't get over Jelena's death. In the end, she fails to appear at the wedding ceremony, choosing to be with Waldek.

Femke's business is almost broke. Raffael, who claims to be her half-brother, moves to Belgium and falls in love with Femke. Femke rejects him, and Raffael sets hotel Ter Smissen on fire during Rosa and Waldek's wedding party. At the same time, Luc and Freddy get into a fight over stealing Sanitechniek stock for insurance fraud; Freddy threatens to tell the police but Luc knocks him onto a table, breaking his neck.

Paulien becomes pregnant and Bram changes his mind a few times but concludes that he doesn't want to be a father and that Pauline should have an abortion. Upset, Pauline reveals to Simonne that Bram stabbed Frank, and Frank launches a raid on Bram.

Tom and Peggy buy Femke's loft, which needs renovation. They stay with Marianne though Peggy can't stand her. Later, it is revealed that Marianne paid Sanitechniek to delay the work.

=== Season 17 ===
Marianne is found guilty of the Ter Smissen hotel fire and Freddy's death, and must pay a large sum to Rosa and Freddy's son.

Raffael continues his secret love affair with Femke. When Femke becomes pregnant by Peter, Raffael puts lovage in her food to cause a miscarriage. Doctor Ann informs the police, while Peter makes Femke leave and Raffael is put under psychiatric care. Peggy ends her relationship with Tom after he tried to kidnap Robin. Later, she begins dating Peter which displeases Femke and Tom. Tom begins dating his secretary, Lynn, while Femke becomes depressed and addicted to drugs.

Rosa and Jenny start a bed and breakfast, overcoming the establishment's prior image as a swingers club. Leo moves his taxi company; he falls in love with Jenny and when he tries to inform his girlfriend, Yvette, she suffers a stroke. Some time later, Yvette becomes suspicious and ends their relationship.

Fien and Jens quarrel and she leaves. Her DNA and earring are found in Guy's apartment, and Guy tells Julia that he killed Fien on an impulse. In court Tom convinces the judge that Fien died due to a hereditary heart disease, and Guy is released. Unable to forget Fien, Jens leaves.

Franky's relationship with his new boyfriend, Tibo, is in risk when Tibo learns about Frank's stabbing. They promise not to have secrets, but Tibo is hiding a fifteen-year-old daughter, Jana, who lives with her lesbian mother, Ellen. Franky is shocked but later asks Tibo to marry him, while hiding the fact that Jana is in love with Bram.

Mayra moves in with Ann and starts a jewelry business, but her inventory is stolen by Kasper, the son of Rosa and Waldek, who owes money to criminals. Marianne's husband Geert keeps inviting Mayra's father, David, and Marianne realizes she has feelings for David. Eddy returns and, after successfully hobby-brewing beer with Frank and Waldek, they buy a brewery with Geert and David as investors.

At Franky and Tibo's wedding, the gifts are stolen by Kasper. Marianna and David end up in bed where David suffers a stroke. Jana and Bram are caught together by Tibo. Simmone quarrels with a drunk Frank and is hit by a car driven by Femke, who doesn't notice.

=== Season 18 ===
Kasper delivers the stolen money to the criminal organization. He finds Simmone who has brain injury. Peggy loans Kasper money to conceal the theft. Femke is interrogated by Tim, who makes a procedural error but Femke is determined to face justice. She is given a large fine and has to sell her loft. She moves in with her mother but after a conflict with Eddy she moves to Tim.

The criminal organization hides drugs in the B&B. Sandrine, believing it is sugar, is rushed to hospital. Ann withdraws Peggy's visitation rights over the incident. Later, Guy holds Sandrine, Mayra and Marianne hostage, which Peggy uses as an argument that the doctor's home is no safer.

Peggy buys pepper spray when she learns that rapist Axel has been released, and uses it on a burglar in her bistro. The burglar, Kasper, falls and dies, and Peggy decides to sell the bistro. Franky and Jens buy the building and open a trendy pub.

After Geert learns his wife Marianne slept with David he wants divorce and leaves the practice, replaced by Judith. David is fired from the brewery, which nears bankruptcy without his know-how and is sold. David moves away though Marianne refuses to go with him. Luc is surprised at the sudden appearance of his 16-year-old son, Lowie, whose mother died. Lowie starts a relationship with Jana, who learns she is pregnant by Bram. Against her wishes, Franky gets in touch with Bram who returns, and Jana ultimately chooses to be with Bram. Lowie is taken to hospital after binge drinking and falsely claims that Franky served him alcohol at the pub. Franky and Jens receive a small fine as there was insufficient proof.

Yvette burns her hands and moves into a rest home where her roommate is Madeleine, who has amnesia and diabetes. One day Ann forgets a protocol which leads to Madeleine dying of an insulin overdose, and Ann's medical license is suspended for three months. Geert moves temporary back to the medical practice .

Eddy and Frank are installing fake merchandise and selling the real goods on the Internet. Eddy persuades Luc to continue the swindle. Among the merchandise is a boiler installed at the B&B, which causes Jana to collapse from carbon monoxide poisoning and miscarry. Eddy is arrested and Frank turns himself in, while Luc feigns ignorance. Tom tries to seduce Judith to the dismay of his former girlfriend, Lynn. Lynn tells doctor Judith that she was raped by Tom. Lynn's father claims he can save Tom if Marianne marries him, and she agrees. When Lynn learns of this she withdraws her accusation, negating the deal.

Frank and Eddy are released on conditions and want to beat Luc. Lowie is upset with Luc for lying about their past. Jana, Tibo and Bram are furious as proof comes out that Luc knew about the swindle. Everyone is together for Peter and Peggy's wedding, and as they leave the church an unconscious and injured Luc is found.

=== Season 19 ===
Luc survives, and Jana, Tibo and Bram each confess to his attempted murder. Eventually, Lowie confesses and produces the weapon used. Luc does not charge his son, so Lowie is sentenced to charity work at a library. Despite a court order to stay with Luc, Lowie stays with Julia; he feels betrayed when he learns they are dating again, but reconciles when he realizes they are serious about each other. Frank and Eddy are discharged from the swindle after Luc admits to forcing their participation.

Tibo is fired after trying to suffocate Luc; he leaves with Franky, who assigns Bram to manage the pub. Later, Bram leaves the country; Jana wants to go with him but he sneaks away so she'll finish high school.

Jens begins teaching guitar to fourteen-year-old Emma, who has a crush on him. When Jens tells her he's not interested in her, Emma allows her mother to come to a wrong conclusion and have Jens arrested for pedophilia. Jens is exonerated and Emma moves in with her father.

Frank starts work at an odd-jobs company where a prank with co-workers Adil and Toon leads to his electrocution. Toon is fired and gets a job with Luc's new team-building company, then is reassigned to De Kabouters.

Tim learns Femke is pregnant. He stops her outside a wedding for an alcohol test and catches her in parole violation. Later, Femke is released, still pregnant. It is revealed that Peter is the father and he leaves his wife Peggy to move in with Femke, who delivers a son, Lucas. When Jens moves away, Paulien and Femke take over the pub.

Mayra also wants to have a child, and she and Ann convince Kurt to be a sperm donor but he changes his mind when this becomes public knowledge. Obsessed, Mayra has sex with multiple men, and one night is raped by Kurt. Waldek stops Kurt, and some days later Kurt's body is found in the river, and Waldek remembers pushing him in. Mayra finds she is pregnant by Kurt. Waldek is discharged due to lack of evidence.

Mayra and Marianne have a quarrel and fall from the stairs. Emma is kidnapped by a Facebook chat-friend, possibly Geert. Judith and Tom drive to Geert's country house, but find no trace of Geert or Emma. Peggy kidnaps Lucas at a party and heads to a lake to commit murder-suicide. Rosa and Frank discover what's going on and both drive with their car to the lake. There is a car accident but it is not known who is involved.

=== Season 20 ===
Rosa has a car accident and is in coma for several weeks. Frank stops Peggy from killing herself and Lucas. Femke starts a lawsuit against Peggy but cannot prove the murder attempt. Peggy is declared non compos mentis and goes to a mental institution. Tim determines that officer Danny kidnapped Emma. Geert is discharged and wants a divorce as Marianne didn't believe him. Marianne assigns Eddy as her assistant. She accuses Geert of not helping a person in an emergency and has his medical license suspended. She offers Eddy money to beat her so she can accuse Geert of domestic violence. As Eddy refuses Marianne harms herself. Marianne goes to rehabilitation and cancels her complaint. She starts dating William. Geert begins dating Hélène who convinces him to sue Marianne for wage loss, receiving €160,000.

Lowie buys a house and rents rooms to Olivia, Paulien, Jana, Tim and Sam. Jana moves back to Frank and Simonne's after learning Lowie cheated on her. Paulien asks Adil and Lowie to pose half naked for a book's cover photo, and they agree as long as their faces aren't shown. However, Lena chooses a photo with Adil's face and persuades Paulien to give approval. Adil feels betrayed, especially when he learns the book is about homosexuality.

Peggy sells her shares in the taxi company which are bought by Femke. Jenny has a heart attack when Luc announces he sold half of his shares in Zus & Zo to Peter. Feeling she is too old Jenny sells her shares to Peggy.

Sam is pregnant and wants an abortion as she was abandoned as an infant. After a conversation with Simonne she decides to keep the baby. Sam searches her biological mother and is upset when it turns out to be Simonne. Simonne was misled by her mother Yvette De Backe when Sam was born.

Julia marries Luc and kicks him out when she learns he has been embezzling from the team-building company. Co-owners Peter and Femke blackmail Luc, threatening to inform the police unless he hands over the property and his shares. Louis determines that Luc drove Leontien off the road and is responsible for her death.

Frank and Simonne hold a 20th anniversary party. Franky returns but won't attend and has shocking news: he's divorced Tibo – and will be undergoing gender reassignment surgery. The party is a success until a video montage shows an inserted confession from Luc asking for forgiveness. Elsewhere, Luc hangs himself.

Geert marries Hélène and William convinces Marianne to marry him. Marianne reads emails on Hélène's phone and suspects she is having a secret affair with a man named Henri and is about to lose €160,000. She reveals her suspicions to Geert in front of Hélène and William. Moments later, Ann and Mayra rush in to the sound of screams and find Marianne holding a bloody knife over a dead Geert. Marianne claims Hélène is the killer but Hélène and William say it was Marianne.

=== Season 21 ===
Luc survives the suicide attempt but has to learn to speak again. Frank convinces Simonne to let Yvette come back into their home. Marianne is arrested for Geert's murder. Hélène and William have a secret affair and plotted to kill Geert and Marianne to inherit all their possessions. Marianne and William temporarily move to Tuscany. Hélène claims William tried to drown her. Tom confronts William, but Marianne says that William changed his mind and they're really in love. Marianne becomes suspicious when William hides a gun in their home. Confronting him at her 70th birthday party she suffers a cardiac arrest and demands a divorce. Danny is on trial for kidnapping and sexual misbehaviour to Emma. He escapes during transport and holds Emma and Sam hostage in the De Kabouters warehouse. Toon intervenes when Danny is going to shoot Sam, and is himself shot in the lungs. Police storm in and arrest Danny, who commits suicide in jail. Lena accepts Jens' wedding proposal which she'd rejected days before. Jens runs to the taxi to give her the engagement ring but is struck by a car driven by Paulien. He dies on Christmas Day at the same time Hannah, daughter of Tim and Sam, is born.

Waldek has lost his feelings for Rosa and moves into Frank's house. Rosa and Peggy suspect Waldek has an affair with Julia, which turns out to be true. Peter and Femke become the owners of the Zus&Zo, kick out Rosa and Peggy and start a new team-building business.

Franky completes gender reassignment and wants to be addressed as Kaat. Frank can't accept Kaat and breaks contact. Toon is intrigued by Kaat until he learns she was a man. Others accept Kaat who starts working for De Withoeve. Frank tries to win back Simonne but she wants a divorce if he won't accept Kaat.

Femke buys the car from Zus & Zo, and has a collision which kills Lucas. Peggy is suspected of tampering with the car, but a drunk Eddy confesses. Eddy is sent to prison and Nancy divorces.

Lowie receives pictures of Olivia and Arne together and becomes jealous. She ends their relationship. Jessica reveals to Tamara that she's sending the pictures with Arne's cooperation. Olivia grows closer to Arne despite not reciprocating his love. At a party, he puts a date rape drug in her drinks and takes pictures whilst raping her.

Femke and Peter's wedding was cancelled due to Lucas' death, and Peter secretly arranges a new ceremony. Femke books their first customer for LEV on the same day and doesn't notice what's happening and leaves. Nancy informs her. Femke feels guilty and reorganizes the wedding.

In agreement with the new attorney at Tom's office, Hélène meets with William to record their conversations. Unaware of this, Tom thinks she is violating her bail conditions. Hélène goes missing and her body is found in William's house. Meanwhile, William tries to suffocate Marianne in her hospital room. Tom catches William but is overpowered.

=== Season 22 ===
Judith knocks-out William, saving Tom and Marianne. William is arrested. Marianne and Rosa trick him, leading to a fraud investigation and the recovery of Marianne's money.

Arne starts seeing a psychiatrist and Jana, who interns there, learns that Arne drugged Olivia and tells her. Olivia confronts Arne who tries to kill himself. Jana is expelled by the university for ethics violation.

Karen, a new partner in Tom and Peter's law practice, wants to throw Peter out for losing clients. Peter resigns but sells most of his shares to Tom, giving him a majority. In revenge, Karen tries to get Eddy out of jail by saying that he was acting under Peter's orders. At the last moment, Eddy says that Karen manipulated him and does not agree to her plea. Eddy is sentenced to 5 years but is released on probation after several months.

Femke gives birth to a son, Vic. Jenny and Leo visit Bianca in Morocco, where Jenny stays to help during Bianca's pregnancy. The day Jenny returns, she has a fatal stroke. Charité starts a relationship with Renzo but is astonished when her husband – thought killed in a civil war – appears. Adam faces deportation, having entered the country illegally.

Frank comes to accept Kaat, but Simmone already concluded their marriage is over. Blaming Kaat, Frank attacks her and is stopped by Toon. Yvette confronts Frank over this during which she suffers a heart attack; she dies. Eventually Frank and Simonne move back together, Frank knowing that she had an affair with Waldek. Toon and Kaat start dating, but Toon leaves her brokenhearted with a letter saying he can't return her feelings.

Julia confronts Simonne and Waldek over their affair; they claim it ended and they never had sex, though Julia does not believe them. Julia goes missing and evidence suggests she was murdered by Waldek, who is jailed. Julia appears months later with a Goth makeover, acting like nothing happened. Waldek is released. Sam fires Frank after he has another fight with Waldek.

Tom gets Stan and Emma's help to propose to Judy. Ann and Mayra decide to marry, but a video of Mayra trying to rape Jessica is put on social media, and Ann throws Mayra out. A hearing determines they should have shared custody of Sandrine, which displeases Ann.

Sam's business is almost bankrupt and decides to do a job off the books, but the client refuses to pay since they didn't have a contract. Frank and Youssef demolish the work but are caught by the police.

Julia goes crazy, pouring boiling water over Luc and putting sleeping pills in his cookies, risking his life. Waldek is missing, shown bound, and the police suspect Eddy and Frank.

Karen's estranged brother, Kobe, arrives to tell her that their mother died. He starts working as a cook at De Withoeve. During a business lunch with Steven Lambrechts, it is revealed that Kobe is actually Karen's son and Steven is his father.

=== Season 23 ===
Luc appeals to an escort but she eats a poisoned cookie and dies. Waldek is captured by Julia who threatens revenge on all who harmed her. She reveals to have killed her ex-husband. Julia sends Mayra poisoned chocolates resulting Mayra and Sandrine are being admitted to hospital. Rosa discovers evidence in Julia's cookbook and informs the police, who arrest her. Karen explains her mother raised Kobe as Steven was engaged to another woman and she didn't feel she could raise Kobe. Steven informs Karen he has ALS which Kobe may have inherited. Kobe can't handle this and starts taking drugs. Kobe blames Kaat when he is fired and tells Karen he killed Kaat. Kaat is found alive and taken to hospital. Tom and Judith marry, but the reception is a disaster. Ann is furious there's no place for her lover, Jessica, and their relationship is slighted in Marianne's speech, provoking Ann to propose marriage. Jessica breaks off the relationship, feeling that she's treated as a trophy. Ann declares that Tom and Karen are having an affair. Judith is heartbroken and leaves Tom, while Ann pressures Judith to kick Marianne out of the house. Judith wants an immediate divorce. The judge orders that they share their belongings, so a furious Judith saws their furniture in half. They sell their house which is bought by Ann. Without asking, Marianne moves in at Tom's place. Stan can convince his mother to sign papers so Tom becomes his adoption father. After a medical test, it turns out Adil his semen is of low quality so he and Paulien start an In vitro fertilization-treatment. Luc does not want to live anymore and he signs papers to get a euthanasia. His last wish is to go on a road trip with Lowie and Frank. He dies on their way to Valencia. Marianne and Leo are sure Tom spoils Stan too much. Since he moved in at Tom's house, Stan became a rude boy with many strings on his bow. When Leo confronts Stan, Stan tells him he had hoped Marianne died when she was taken into hospital. Leo cuffs his ear. Stan, feigning to have a brain concussion, convinces Tom to inform the police. Mayra gives birth to Zoë. Afraid the baby will have disability due to the poisoned cookies, she switches the newborn with another. Some weeks later she learns that their daughter died, but carries on as if nothing is wrong. After a blood test on Zoë, Waldek gets suspicious about Zoë's blood group. Doctor Judith confirms Waldek can't be the father. Mayra flees away with Zoë but loses control over the car and crashes in a ditch. Whilst still in the car, she confesses Zoë is neither her child. The car gets on fire. At same time, Leo wants to apologize Stan for hitting him. Stan pushes Leo against the wall breaking his skull. Stan leaves the house as nothing has happened. A bleeding unconscious Leo is found by Marianne and Tom.

=== Season 24 ===
Leo survives the attack. Waldek is able to save Mayra and Zoë from the car. He demands her to leave so she moves to Cape Verde.

Dries starts working at the law firm, but his real intention is to sue Karin as she committed fraud in a case in which Dries his father (and many other people) should have gotten a huge amount of money which she darkened. He succeeds and she is suspended for a year.

Tamara is pregnant of Bob. When she informs him he ends their relationship as he does not want a child yet. After babysitting for Emile, a pupil in Olivia's class whose father Lander works at the taxi company, Bob realizes he does like children. He pleases Tamara to restart their relationship but she rejects.

Steven marries Rosa. As his ALS takes overhand, he commits euthanasia. Just before dying he bought a villa in Spain for Rosa and Kobe. This is noticed by tax inspection who thinks the villa was paid with dark money. They start up an investigation and all the financials of "Stevenson", the wine company of Steven and Kobe, are frozen. It turns out no fraud was committed.

Frank gets carjacked. Some weeks later he is attacked again in his home by the same person as he recognizes the gloves. Frank is shocked when those gloves are in the backpack of Emile. The police is called to interrogate Lander. Lander takes Olivia and Sandrine as hostages. Sandrine is shot by Dieter by accident and dies. He decides to stop as a police officer and reopens the pub in "De Withoeve". Olivia and Lowie become the adoptive parents until Emile pushes a pregnant Paulien from the stairs by accident. She loses the child and her uterus. She becomes depressed, stops her relationship with Adil, neglects her pub...

Judith started a relationship with Jacques, the coach of the swimming club. After a quarrel with Jacques, Judith gets some bruising on her wrists. When Judith gets some broken ribs, Ann informs Emma and Tom. Everybody is blaming Jacques for mistreating Judith. Stan claims Jacques made a sexual approach to him and thus a pedophile. Nobody understands why Judith still defends Jacques until it turns out Stan is the wrongdoer. Joren figures out he is gay and in love with Stan which seems to be mutual.

Bob starts a relationship with Christine. Nobody likes Christine as she is a manipulator, gossip, faked a pregnancy of Bob and also faked the abortion. She also brought Olivia more than once in discredit only to get better herself. Lowie finds out Bob is still in love with Tamara. Olivia finds out Tamara still has feelings for Bob.

Bill, the alcoholic father of Joren, wants to rejoin with him, but Joren is not impressed. One day Stan, Joren and another friend drink lots of hard liquor. Joren, who was to be at school, misses a school test. Bill finds the three who run by bicycle. Joren falls over the train rails. Bill runs upon the rails but is hit by a train and taken into hospital.

In season's finale it is insinuated Bill died. Stan tells Joren not to be gay and it was just for fun. Bob and Christine marry. Olivia stops the ceremony and tells everyone Bob is still in love with Tamara and that Tamara just gave birth to his child. Bob wants to leave the town hall, but Christine claims she is also pregnant.

=== Season 25 ===
Due to COVID-19 the complete season could not be recorded so the season ended on 24 April 2020 instead of 11 June. As filming was no longer possible the producers had to be inventive with the material they had, resulting in a choppy storyline in last episodes. (Note: Attributed to multiple references:)

The wedding between Bob and Christine takes place as she is pregnant. After a blood test it turns out she is not pregnant at all and there is even no proof in her blood she was pregnant lately. Due to this lie, Bob wants to divorce immediately.

Jacques tries to drown Stan in the pool but is stopped by Joren. Stan quits school and gets a job at Stevenson but he does not like it. Next he starts homeschooling but also gives up after some weeks. Finally he joins the army. Kaat did not pass her examinations and stops her course in favor to do a world travel trip.

Pauline starts a relationship with Kobe and they marry. They have the intention to adopt a child. Bianca and Mo, who live in Morocco since several years, die in a car accident. Their son Robin is adopted by Tom De Decker, his biological father.

Dries got his master's degree and stops his job as gigolo which does not suit one of his clients: Reinhilde. She turns in a complaint claiming Dries got lots of extra money and presents from her. As this is considered to be legal profit she hints the police Dries did not pay taxes on these extras and most probably did not turn in all of his profits. The tax department starts an investigation but it turns out Dries does not have black money and he is in rule with law.

At Bowie Dries is hired for the position of lawyer consultant. Karin is still angry at Dries because of his actions in previous season. Reinhilde attacks Dries sexually and then sets up a plan with Karin to prove Dries is the wrongdoer and raped Reinhilde. Customers of Bowie get knowledge of the twisted story and want to stop their projects so Dries is fired. After investigation it is proved Karin spread the rumor to those customers. Reinhilde gets remorse and wants to withdraw her statement which does not please Karin. That's why Reinhilde does not want to work any longer with Karin. Tom is informed about the fake acquisitions and wants to stop his partnership with Karin. As she rejects, he starts up a procedure so she never can be a lawyer again. He gets support from Reinhilde, Dries and Peter.

To everyone's surprise Adil started a relationship with Christine. An astonished Bob decides Bowie will not work with The Kabouters anymore.

Jasper, the boxing teacher of Ann, is found guilty of the murder on the manageress of pub "Bar Madam", the rape on Tilly and sales of drugs. All of this is proved in a setup arranged by his daughter Viv and the police. Jasper admits the selling of the drugs, claims the death was an accident but claims he did not rape Tilly. In a flashback it is revealed to the viewers Jacques was the wrongdoer. Jasper is sent to jail. Jacques starts a part-time job as real estate salesman in the company of Reinhilde and goes to Spain for some time to sell some houses.

In last episode Jasper is set free due to procedural errors. Viv is upset and is sure Jasper will come after her. A severe accident takes place. Policeman Tim only reveals the victim is someone he knows.

=== Season 26 ===
Tania reveals she was raped a long time ago and got pregnant. Her son Xander is now in search of his father and is in a rage when he hears about how he was impregnated. After a DNA-test reveals Walter De Decker was the rapist, Xander starts strangling Tania. Doctor Ann interferes and by killing him she saves Tania's life. The act is ruled as self-defense. As Marianne always knew about the rape, Ann moves abroad.

Frank and Simonne decide to move to an apartment and sell their house. Due to an issue with a fuse "De Kabouters" are hired to fix the electric cabin. Joren – who did the job – had to leave early so Frank finished the job. The house burns down due to a short circuit and Frank did not pay the invoice of the fire insurance.

Lowie starts dating the drug addicted Roxanne Goethals, sister of BOWIE's most important customer. Lowie realizes he must end the relationship so he does. An upset Roxanne puts drugs in Lowie his cup of tea. Lowie ends up in hospital but survives. Mister Goethals thinks Lowie started with drugs so he decides to stop all business with BOWIE. Harry Peeters also stops his project, but as he convinced Louis to make some changes in the standard contract, he does not have to pay BOWIE at all. Roxanne is interrogated by the police. Afterwards she is found dead in a burned out car.

A charming man brings a visit to pub "Bar Madam" but steals money from the till so Angèle is temporary fired as she was responsible. Eddy runs into that man and they start a fight. Eddy gets a huge hit on his head and can't smell anything for a couple of months.

Totally unexpected Nina stands in front of Leo. She is with her child Yasmine on the run from Interpol as she is found guilty of a huge swindle. She claims she was framed by her mother. Things get more complicated when it turns out Peter impregnated Nina and he is aware of the fathership. This leads to a break between Peter and Femke.

Dieter concludes Jacques is involved in the murder of Jasper. Jacques finds out the police is shadowing him thus flees away. Reinhilde is also found dead and Dries is the heir according her will, making him rich.

Jacques holds Rosa and Waldek but is shot down by Dieter. He falls in the river and is assumed dead. However, he survived but the bullet is still in his body. He enters some house and forces the owner to call doctor Judith who comes over. Jacques kills the owner and holds Judith as a hostage. She is freed by Waldek and Tilly after Judith was able to send a text message. Once outside, they run into Jacques, but the police also arrives and Jacques is shot dead. In the season's finale the viewer is informed Rosa is abducted by Jacques and hold somewhere else. Leo and Marianne marry.

=== Season 27 ===
On his wedding day Leo gets a stroke and dies. The police starts an investigation after the missing Rosa but it is Waldek who finds her in Jacques his car. Christine has a partial miscarriage: one of the twins died in the uterus. Due to this, the other baby had to be born via a Caesarean section. Christine has no bondage with the child and she is taken into a psychiatric institute for undefined time.

Ilias, a nephew of Dieter, is arrested by police for driving a souped-up moped. He is a rather rude, wagging school young man who decided to leave his last year in high school until he meets Silke on which he has a crush. She admits or feigns to also have feelings for Ilias but he must prove himself by doing all kind of wager tasks such as going to class in a woman's outfit.

Silke, who studies laws at university, gets Karin as one of her teachers. Silke spreads all kind of gossips about Karen, posts photoshopped images of her via social media... Karin wants to take revenge but figures out Silke is the daughter of dean Stefaan Le Grand.

A fighting divorce starts between Femke and Peter about who is going to raise Vic. Peter does not want Kobe around Vic due to his past. Karin is not upset Peter puts Kobe in a bad light and starts helping Femke to get as much as sche can. Karin also starts up a procedure to clear Kobe his criminal record.

=== Season 30 ===
In the season finale, Cédric (who, meanwhile, remained obsessed with having a new family) stays at Lowie's house and organizes a candlelight dinner for Marie, who wants him gone. The "dinner" quickly devolves into a hostage situation, with Vince, who realizes it and goes there to save Marie. It ends in a fight with Cédric, causing the candles and alcohol to cause a fire in Lowie's house. Vince and Niels go outside with Frank who notices the fire while Cédric returns to save Marie but was hit by a burning beam and became an obstacle for Marie who falls unconscious. Karin and Waldek get married while Thilly and the police search their villa because she has believed for months that the two murdered Jean-Marc and find traces of blood that may be his. Robin, who is angry at Tom for the tensions throughout the season and at Tom and Karin because the two are against the relationship between him and Thérèse and the fact that he has to repeat the last year of school, takes revenge by making a video in which the two of them open each other with AI modified into an affair and uploading it and showing it to Judith during the wedding. This puts the second relationship between Tom and Judith in jeopardy, as well as Karin's marriage to Waldek, and it remains unclear whether Waldek will fall for it. The two are arrested minutes later by Thilly and the police while Dieter and Nancy, who knew the facts and kept them secret, watch. Andreas has a real date with Emma and the two kiss for the first time together with a possible relationship that starts while the two don't notice the fire at Lowie's house. Christine and Peter settle into their new home, which was originally the site where De Kabouters, ACE and Vita Puur were located.

=== Season 31 ===
In the season premiere and in September, Vince gets into Lowie's burning house and saves Marie and both were taken to the hospital while Andreas and Emma both heard the news. Cédric dies in the fire and the confirmation of his death shocks Emma, Niels and Britt. The other part of the house is still largely intact, but the main part of the house has been declared uninhabitable, so Andreas and Marie move with Peter's help to his previous house, which is owned by Tom. Sunny goes out with Lyn at his work place for the evening, but it's discovered the next day and he's fired. Luckily, he gets rehired with Vince's help. Sunny can't live with Robin either, so Thérèse moves with Robin to the other part of Lowie's house until they find something. Britt thinks that Cédric has already been forgotten by everyone, including Niels, and she thinks that is a shame (she doesn't know what Cédric did at the end, except for Marie and Vince).

Judith immediately believes in Robin's video that it is actually AI and breaks up with Tom with while Robin goes to Thérèse to celebrate his revenge plan with her. Lyn moves into Tim's mansion apartment to also help him with Hannah who has leukemia. Judith and Emma don't want Tom around anymore, while he tries to find evidence that Robin's video is fake and that Robin only made it for revenge. With the help of Andreas and Peter, he immediately finds evidence that the video was made with AI. Andreas is the one that reveal the truth to Emma who immediately informs Judith, causing the latter to be reunited with Tom while Tom and Karin no longer want to see Robin after his revenge plan.

Karin and Waldek are being interrogated by Thilly and the police regarding Jean-Marc's disappearance and after blood was found in their villa. Tom is supposed to be the lawyer for both of them and use Karin for his own problems, but Karin fires him. Just as Karin is about to reveal the truth, news arrives that the blood wasn't Jean-Marc's, but Dries's, who was accidentally stabbed by Robin over a year ago when he was afraid of Gregory and his gang in season 29. This results in Karin and Waldek being released. Thilly is furious that she's behind again without a confession or evidence and gets drunk. She seems to be leaving again but is convinced by her acquaintances to stay. It is currently unknown whether she will now also drop the investigation into Jean-Marc's disappearance. Waldek still supports Karin despite the video. It looks like the two are making another attempt at marriage, but this time on a small scale. A new date of 23 September was revealed.

Selin Tekin, a single mother and a new nurse at the hospital, struggles with her work but receives support from Anna.

== Locations ==
=== Current locations ===
The current locations (homes and businesses) and who lives or works there in Thuis as of 2025. Some decors were previously used for previous homes and businesses.

Current homes

- Tim's mansion (Marianne's former mansion), where he lives with Hannah C. Lyn lives in the apartment. Marianne, Walter D., Tom, Ann, Bianca, Jean-Pierre, Walter F., Bengo, Sofie B., Sam B., Martine, Eric B., Sandrine D., Mayra, Geert S. Judith, Emma V., Stan V., Joren and Sam D. used to live there with former lodgers Jenny, Bianca, Carlos B., Harry M., Femke, Claire Ba., Joseph, Charité, Nancy, Eddy V., Tom, Peggy, Paulien, Veerle and Dieter. Ann, Sandrine D., Tania, Peter, Yasmine, Vic, Nancy and Dieter lived in the apartment. Tim is the current owner. Charles (the deceased father of Marianne, Carlos B. and Claire Ba.), Carlos B., Claire Ba., Marianne, Tom, Judith, Ann and Sam D. were the previous owners. The fictional address and exterior shots take place at Dreef 21, 1740 Ternat. (E1–ongoing, S1–ongoing, 1995–ongoing)
- The separate living area of Tim's mansion (the former doctor's office). Frank, Simonne and Rosa live here with former lodgers Eddy V., Kaat and Niels. (E5096–ongoing, S27–ongoing, 2021–ongoing)
- Eddy's apartment, where he lives and rents with Vince. Isabelle, Eva, Nancy and Angèle were the former tenants. Many characters lived and stayed there, such as Isabelle, Eva, Nancy, Angèle, Britt, Frank and Febe. The apartment is on the same floor as Femke and Waldek's former apartments, and in the same apartment building as Rosa's former apartment. Although the series features different apartments, Eddy's apartment was temporarily used for Rosa's from 2016 to 2018. The outdoor location filming will take place in the Borrekensveld neighborhood, located at Borrekensveld 24–29, 1853 Grimbergen. It's the only filming location in Grimbergen. (E1589–ongoing, S9–ongoing, 2004–ongoing)
- The house in De Withoeve, residence of Femke, Nancy and Dieter. For Vic it is a lodging (co-parenting with Peter). Waldek, Jenny, Leo Vert., Rosa, Peggy, Vince and Britt used to live there. According to E4352 in S23 in 2018, the fictitious address of the house is Rozenlaan 31a, 1740 Ternat (previously the address was Rozenlaan 31 until a new house was built on the farm). (E3068–ongoing, S17–ongoing, 2011–ongoing)
- Lowie's house, Niels, Britt, Robin and Thérèse stay here, they live in the other part of the house. Lowie is the current owner. Sam D. and Tim were the previous owners. Olivia, Paulien, Jana, Adil, Bob, Tamara Ve., Dries, Silke L., Lowie, Marie and Andreas were the previous residents. Tim, Sam D., Joren, Hannah C., Silke L., Viv, Adam and Cédric B. also stayed here, they lived in the other part of the house. The fictional address: unknown (Dreef ?, 1740 Ternat) (E3622–ongoing, S20–ongoing, 2014–ongoing). In E1358 in S8 in 2003, a scene takes place in front of the house's exterior location, in which Frank and Simonne have problems with a mailbox. The main part of the house is currently damaged and uninhabitable after a fire in E5894–5895 in S30–31 in 2025.
- Waldek's apartment. This one is empty. (A reworked version of the decor of Peter and Femke's apartment was used for the decor of the apartment.) Toon, Mayra, Adil and Waldek were the former tenants. In 2024 and 2025, Waldek moved in with Karin for an extended period and left the apartment behind. This could raise doubts about whether he was actually renting it and not the owner. Toon, Mayra, Sandrine D., Thilly, Adil, Christine, Lyn and Waldek were the previous residents. Frank and Waldek were former lodgers. The fictional address: unknown (The exterior shots take place at Sint-Maartensdal 3, 3000 Leuven, an apartment building in the eponymous district in Leuven.) (E4026–ongoing, S22–ongoing, 2016–ongoing)
- House of Marie and Andreas (Previously, Notariaat Vlerick and Advocaten De Decker en Baert were located there), where they now live and rent. Tom is the current owner. Kobe, Paulien, Christine, Adil and Peter were the previous tenants. Marianne, Stan V., Tom, Robin, Karin, Paulien, Kobe, Adil, Christine, Jaan, Peter and Yasmine were the previous residents. Rosa, Thilly, Eddy V. and Vic were guests. The fictional address: Dreef 4, 1740 Ternat. (E4394–ongoing, S23–ongoing, 2018–ongoing)
- Karin's villa, where she lives with Waldek. The villa is also used as an office for her law firm. Dries used to work in the law firm in the villa. Karin is the current owner. Steven L., Kobe and Rosa were the previous owners. Steven L., Rosa, Kobe, Paulien, Tom, Marianne and Robin were the previous residents, with Robin also as a former lodger. According to E5670 in S29 in 2024, the fictitious address of the villa is Fazantenlaan 70, 1740 Ternat. (E4495–ongoing, S24–ongoing, 2018–ongoing, the villa had already been filmed several times before November 2018, but an existing house was used for this one)
- The apartment above Bar Madam. Thilly and Emma V. live there. Frank, Simonne, Judith and Lyn were the previous residents and Harry P. and Cédric B. also slept there. As with Bar Madam, Thilly is the current owner. Thierry De Vyver and Harry P. were the previous owners. According to E5757 in S30 in 2024, the fictitious address of Bar Madam and the apartment is Half Maartstraat 17, 1740 Ternat. There is a second apartment above Bar Madam, but it was never filmed. (E5096–ongoing, S27–ongoing, 2021–ongoing, however, there had already been talk of the apartment since S26)
- Sunny's apartment, where he lives and rents. Thérèse used to live there. It's striking that no establishing shot has yet been used for this house. This makes it the first and only permanent location in the series where the exterior remains unknown to the viewer. According to E5689 in S30 in 2024, the fictitious address of the apartment is Stationsstraat 43, 1740 Ternat. (E5680–ongoing, S30–ongoing, 2024–ongoing)
- Tom's villa, where he lives with Judith. Marianne, Anna and Robin lived there. Tom is the current owner and the villa is also used as an office for his law firm. According to E32 from the podcast Welkom Thuis, to install this decor, the decor of Advocaten De Decker was removed. The fictional address: unknown (E5745–ongoing, S30–ongoing, 2024–ongoing)
- Christine and Peter's home (the building used to be of De Kabouters, ACE and Vita Puur) where they live with Yasmine and Jaan. Vic uses it as a lodging home (co-parenting with Femke). The fictitious address of the house is Kruisstraat 17, 3090 Overijse (address when De Kabouters and ACE were there). (E5891–ongoing, S30–ongoing, 2025–ongoing)

Current businesses

- Feniks, created from a merger between De Withoeve and Stevenson, acts as an umbrella company and includes a winery, wine bar, events agency and hotel. The name Feniks is a tribute to the name of Stevenson's wine. Femke, Karin, Rosa, and Waldek are the current shareholders. The four, along with Marie and Robin, are also current employees. Tamara Ve., Sunny and Thérèse A. were former employees. According to the new opening credits, Cody will also soon become an employee. According to E5365 in S28 in 2023, the fictitious address of the company is Rozenlaan 31, 1740 Ternat. Outdoor filming is taking place at the winery, specifically in the vineyard, at the wine vats, in the wine cellars, and at the glamping barrel. This filming takes place at the Wijndomein Petrushoeve in Bekkevoort. (E5294–ongoing, S28–ongoing, 2022–ongoing)
  - De Withoeve, this part of the company has a wine bar, an events agency and a hotel. The buildings now house the taxi company Taxi Nancy, which also previously housed Zus & Zo. Before the merger, Peter, Femke and Karin were the previous shareholders. Julia, Frank, Sam D., Kaat, Dieter, Peter, Kobe, Nancy, Tamara Ve., Sunny and Thérèse A. were former employees. Some characters slept in the hotel such as Els, Olivia, Frank, Simonne, Marie and Andreas. The exterior shots are taken at the Celongaet farm, located at Wolfshaegen 128, 3040 Huldenberg (Neerijse). The farm's fictitious address before the merger was Rozenlaan 31a, 1740 Ternat. (E4007–ongoing, S21–ongoing, 2016–ongoing)
  - The wine bar, run by Rosa, Waldek and Femke. Marie, also works here. Tamara Ve., Sunny and Thérèse A. were former employees. The wine bar is located in De Withoeve.
  - the taxi company Taxi Nancy (formerly Taxi LEV, which was previously called Taxi Ter Smissen and Taxi Leo). Nancy works there as a taxi driver. (after E4784–ongoing, S25–ongoing, 2020–ongoing)
  - Stevenson wine shop, run by Rosa, Waldek, and Femke. This is an adjacent building to De Withoeve. The name "Stevenson" is a combination of the name Steven and the English word 'son', referring to his son Kobe. Before the merger, Steven L., Kobe, Rosa, Waldek and Karin were the previous shareholders. Steven L., Stan V., Frank and Kobe were former employees. Since the spring of 2024, the wine shop has not appeared regularly, and the company's employees are usually only seen at the Feniks wine bar. Since the spring of 2025, the wine shop has appeared a few more times. The fictitious address before the merger was Rozenlaan 31b, 1740 Ternat. (E4688–ongoing, S25–ongoing, 2019–ongoing, construction plans started in S24)
- The local pub Bar Madam. Owned by Thilly and managed by Lyn. Emma V. works there sometimes too. It took over from the Frens as a meeting place for the characters. The Bar Madam set also replaced the Frens's set. Thierry De Vyver and Harry P. were the previous owners. Frederieke, Viv, Simonne, Ilias, Angèle, Sunny, Sam D. and Thilly were the former employees. Vicky and Ilias used to work as cleaners. The exterior shots for Bar Madam are taken at Halfmaartstraat 17, 3000 Leuven. The fictitious address of the business is therefore Half Maartstraat 17, 1740 Ternat, a slight adjustment from the actual address (E5757 in S30 in 2024). (E4736–ongoing, S25–ongoing, 2019–ongoing)
- Project developers Vlerick & Bomans (the office used to be Boowie's) of Peter and Andreas, where both work. Lowie was co-owner and former employee. The fictitious address was revealed as Zeeschipstraat 100/25, 1740 Ternat (address in the days of Boowie), but the building used for the company's exterior is the FAC Philips Tower in Leuven. Leuven can also be seen in the background. (E5683–ongoing, S30–ongoing, 2024–ongoing)

Health and Justice

- The hospital where Judith, Anna and Selin now work. Anna also has her own room here where she receives her patients. Britt works there sometimes. Abel, Robin and Cédric B. were the former employees. Initially, the hospital was shown only sporadically, mainly when characters were being admitted. For a long time, the location was a generic set without a specific name, and there were frequent changes between different sets. This changed in 2013. Currently, a hallway, a reception desk, and two flexible spaces are shown. From 1995 to 2013, exterior shots of the hospital were later taken at the AZ Sint-Blasius building in Dendermonde. The term "Universitair Ziekenhuis" (University Hospital) was used for the hospital in the series (E516 in S4 in 1998). On E3350 in S18 in 2013, the hospital received a new permanent set, partly because it became a more important part of the storyline. Regular characters also began working at the hospital, meaning the location was featured more frequently and consistently. The hospital was now referred to in the series as AZ Sint-Jan, a fictional hospital located in Dilbeek (E4956 in S26 in 2021). The permanent set since 2013 includes a hallway, a waiting room, and two flexible spaces. The latter are used for multiple purposes: they are regularly reconfigured as patient rooms, consultation rooms, or waiting areas. To create variety, props in the hallway are moved or adjusted, making it appear as if scenes are taking place on different floors or departments of the hospital. On E4936 in S26 in 2021, the decor was shown in a new light, this time in yellow hues instead of blue. In S29, the set underwent a significant change. At E5567 in 2024, the waiting room was replaced by a reception desk called the "Zorghub." Since then, this location has served as the hospital's emergency department. (E3–ongoing, S1–ongoing, 1995–ongoing)
- The police station where Tim, Dieter, Gerda T., Rami and Thilly now work.
- The prison. Many characters were sometimes imprisoned here. In E3816–4255 in S21–23 in 2015–2017, a permanent setting was used for the prison. There was also a decor for the individual cell. The prison cell decor also appeared in the special: 20 jaar Thuis, when Marianne sang there for Thuis: de Musical. In January 2014, when Femke left prison, the exterior of the prison in Ypres was used for a trailer. However, none of this was shown in the episodes. The prison appeared in S2–3, 7, 11–12, 14, 18, 21–23, 28–30.
- De Linden primary school. Christine is the school principal there and was previously a teacher. Emma V. and Philippe H. work there too. Olivia, Kaat and Bob were the former teachers. Hannah C., Yasmine, Baptiste (appeared in E5294 in S28 in 2022), Luca, Vic, Rami's child and Carlos D.'s child are the current students. Emil, Febe and Leo Vere. were the former students. Tim, Rami, Carlos D., Femke and other parents are members of the parent committee. Peter is also one of the parents. Lander, Vicky, Vince, Bob, Tamara Ve. and Sam D. were the previous parents of the school. Xandra Van Welden, Tom Viaene and Marijntje Van Damme (all three of whom also played other roles in the series) were also seen as parents in E5351–5355 in S28 in 2023. (S24, 28–ongoing, 2018–2019, 2022–ongoing)

Other locations

- The Dreef (Ternat). Tim's mansion, Lowie's house and Andreas and Marie's house are located there. The Gothic parish church Saint Gertrude's Church (Ternat) appears in the background.

The interior shots take place in studio Manhattan in Wilsele and the outdoor shots at various locations in Flemish Brabant (including in Ternat, Asse, Dilbeek) and in the municipality of Ninove in East Flanders.

== Current cast ==
The current actors and actresses and their characters who are appearing in Thuis as of 2025. Some are main and others are supporting or recurring guest actors. Some supporting or recurring guest actors are previously main characters. Some also appeared in spin-offs. Numbers mean the characters are played by multiple actors, sometimes including several children.

Actor	Character	Years	Seasons	Episodes	Ref(s)
Main characters
Pol Goossen (also appeared in E1910, 1960–2026 in S11–12 in 2005–2006 as Manfred Stein)	Frank Bomans	1995–ongoing	1–ongoing	1–ongoing, Special: Afscheid van Florke (2004)	
Annick Segal	Rosa Verbeeck	1995–ongoing	1–ongoing	1–5693, 5736–ongoing, Special: Afscheid van Florke (2004)	
Marleen Merckx	Simonne Backx	1995–ongoing	1–ongoing	1 (voice), 3–461, 491–ongoing, Special: Afscheid van Florke (2004)	
Leah Thys	Marianne Bastiaens	1995–ongoing	1–ongoing	4–24, 52–3861, 3895–5691, 5791–ongoing, Special: Afscheid van Florke (2004)	
Patsy Van der Meeren	Marie 'Mary' Van Goethem (formerly Marie De Ruyter)	1998–2008, 2025–ongoing	4–13, 30–ongoing	538–559, 600–609, 745–756, 797–2350, 5816 (voice), 5823–ongoing	
Kadèr Gürbüz	Karin Baert	2000, 2002, 2004, 2005, 2006, 2007, 2009, 2013, 2014, 2016–2025, 2026–ongoing, also played the main role in podcast audio series Ik, Karin (2020)	5, 7–12, 15, 18–ongoing	760–771, 1086–1094, 1314, 1540, 1799, 1819, 1967, 1996–1997, 2078–2108, 2149, 2190, 2656–2657, 3399–3419, 3598–3625, 3907–5954, 5955 (voice), 5961 (voice), 5991 (voice), 5994–ongoing	
Bart Van Avermaet (also appeared in E741–742 in S5 in 1999 as Serclaes)	Waldek Kosinski	2001–ongoing	7–ongoing	1073–4456, 4497–ongoing, Special: Afscheid van Florke (2004)	
Vanya Wellens	Femke De Grote (formerly Femke Fierens)	2002–2010, 2011–2013, 2014–ongoing	8–ongoing	1286–1327, 1376–1379, 1418–2805, 2905–3405, 3506–ongoing, Special: Afscheid van Florke (2004)	
Ann Pira	Nancy De Grote	2003–ongoing	9–ongoing	1467–1475, 1607–1725, 1879–ongoing	
Daan Hugaert	Eddy Van Notegem	2003–2010, 2012–ongoing	9–ongoing	1467–1475, 1602–1670, 1705–1715, 1879–1922, 1953–2186, 2220–2269, 2371–2807, 2890, 3110–ongoing	
Geert Hunaerts	Peter Vlerick	2007–ongoing	13–ongoing	2255–ongoing	
Jeroen Lenaerts (Dries Van Cauwenbergh played young Tim in flashback in E5759 in S30 in 2024 while he probably also appeared in E4919 in S26 in 2020 as Willem credited as Dries Van Cauwenberghe)	Tim Cremers	2008–2009, 2010–ongoing, Secrets (2018), Tim undercover (2022), also appeared in F.C. De Kampioenen 3: Forever (2017)	14–ongoing	2469–2645, 2735–ongoing	
Wim Stevens (also appeared in 1996 as a student and in E1360–1390 in S8 in 2003 as Victor 'Vic' Lindbergh)	Tom De Decker nr. 2	2009–ongoing	14–ongoing	2551–ongoing	
Katrien De Ruysscher (also appeared in E2048–2100 in S12 in 2006 as Nele)	Judith Van Santen	2012–2014, 2015–ongoing, Secrets (2018)	18–ongoing	3266–3650, 3744–ongoing	
Elise Roels	Emma Van Damme	2012–2014, 2015–2019, 2020–2021, 2024–ongoing, Secrets (2018)	18–27, 29–ongoing	3266–3650, 3744–4675, 4758–5050, 5561–ongoing	
Raf Jansen (also appeared in E2243 in S13 in 2007 as an electrician)	Dieter Van Aert	2014–ongoing, also appeared in F.C. De Kampioenen 3: Forever (2017)	20–ongoing	3607–3693, 3802–ongoing	
Lauren Müller (also appeared in E2643–2660 in S15 in 2009 as Hanne Goris)	Thilly Van Santen	2017–2018, 2019–ongoing	23–ongoing	4255–4372, 4474–4498, 4598–4629, 4659–4765, 4808–4832, 4866–5715, 5789–ongoing	
Apollonia Sterckx	Britney 'Britt' Van Notegem nr. 2	2018–ongoing	23–ongoing	4448–ongoing	
Daphne Paelinck	Christine Leysen	2018–2019, 2020–ongoing	24–ongoing	4464–4477, 4522–4674, 4814–ongoing	
Wannes Lacroix	Niels Le Grand	2021–ongoing	27–ongoing	5055–5473, 5508–ongoing	
Gert Winckelmans	Vincent 'Vince' Pauwels	2022–2024, 2025–ongoing	28–ongoing	5294–5694, 5764 (voice), 5798–ongoing	
Prince K. Appiah	Sunny Addo	2024–ongoing	29–ongoing	5604–5764, 5801–ongoing	
Dara Oguntubi	Therese Addo (spelled as Thérèse Addo in S29)	2024–ongoing	29–ongoing	5636–5757, 5801–5829, 5857–5919, 5955–ongoing	
Kim Van Oncen (Lucie Vandewiele played young Lyn in flashback in E5759 in S30 in 2024)	Lindsay 'Lyn' Cremers	2024–ongoing	30–ongoing	5686–ongoing	
Evelien Van Hamme	Anna Greveling	2024–ongoing	30–ongoing	5705–ongoing	
Kobe Debie	Robin Bomans nr. 3	2024–ongoing	30–ongoing	5707–5919, 5937 (voice), 5955–ongoing	
Pepijn Huysman	Andreas Giebens	2025–ongoing	30–ongoing	5823–ongoing	
Idalie Samad	Selin Tekin	2025–ongoing	31–ongoing	5897–ongoing	
Niels Destadsbader	Cody du Bois	2025–ongoing	31–ongoing	5913–ongoing	
Supporting or recurring guest characters
Chris Thys	Claire Bastiaens	1997, 2008, 2024, 2025, 2026–ongoing	2, 13, 14, 30–ongoing	219–228, 2395–2450, 5681 (voice), 5684–5689, 5697 (voice), 5830 (voice), 5833, 5887, 5936–5942, 5970–5974, 5994–ongoing	
Several children including Léonore Mol (2022–ongoing)	Hannah Cremers	2015–2022–ongoing	21–27–ongoing	3895–5255–ongoing (appear sporadically)	
Leen Dendievel	Kaat Bomans (formerly Franky Bomans)	2016–2019, 2025, 2025–2026, 2026–ongoing	21–25, 30–ongoing	3923, 3947, 3960–4512, 4589–4698, 5778–5805, 5808 (voice), 5976–5983, 6049–ongoing	
Several children including Louis Dekuyper (2024–ongoing)	Vic Vlerick	2017–2024–ongoing	22–30–ongoing	4126–5714–ongoing (appear sporadically)	
Amber Metdepenningen	Yasmine Oostvoghels	2021, 2022–ongoing	26–ongoing	4980–5055, 5130, 5132, 5191–ongoing	
Several children including Boris De Waard (2025–ongoing)	Jaan Bakkal	2021–2025–ongoing	26–31–ongoing	5040–5897–ongoing (appear sporadically)	
Several dogs including Lior	Pips (Hannah's dog)	2021–ongoing	27–ongoing	5129–ongoing (appear sporadically)	
Marieke Dilles (also appeared in E2385–2388 in S13 in 2008 as Annemie Vlerick, the niece of Peter Vlerick)	Vicky Van Aert	2022–2023, 2026–ongoing	28–29, 31–ongoing	5263–5550, 6030–ongoing	
Renée Van Cauwenbergh	Febe Pauwels	2022–2023, 2024, 2025, 2026, 2026–ongoing	28–ongoing	5294–5550, 5582–5583, 5691–5692, 5877, 5892–5893, 5998, 6041–ongoing	
Hannah Ferdoud	Ayla Tekin	2025–ongoing	31–ongoing	5904–ongoing (appear sporadically)	
Gregory Van Damme	Brik	2026–ongoing	31–ongoing	5985–ongoing	
Jeroen Van Dyck	Howard Bastiaens ('Cézar Triosi')	2026–ongoing	31–ongoing	5993–ongoing	

== Former cast ==
Actors and actresses which appeared previously in Thuis including main and supporting or recurring guest actors. Some aren't show on-screen anymore, others moved on to other locations or others died. Numbers mean the characters are played by multiple actors, sometimes including several children.

Actor	Character	Year(s)	Reason departure	Episodes
Goele Denil	Inez	2026	She no longer appeared on screen after Selin discovered that she was still married and broke off contact with her.	6015–6027
Veerle Eyckermans (also appeared in episodes E1656–1666, 1706–1759, 1785–1876 in S10–11 in 2004–2005 as Magda Clerckx)	Greet Van de Vyver	2024, 2025–2026	She no longer appeared on screen.	5616–5617, 5931–?
Begir Memeti	Rami Aslan	2024–2026	Arrested and imprisoned for the murder of Katrien, he also took Thilly and Zeger hostage. Thilly, Tim, and especially Zeger were injured as a result.	5687–5992 (appear sporadically)
Rodrigo Vissers	Inspector Zeger	2025–2026	He did not appear on screen again after he and Thilly were taken hostage by Rami.	5977–5989, 5990 (voice)
Griet Boels	† Katrien Streuvels	2025–2026	Murdered by Rami at the entrance of De Withoeve.	5917, 5955–5977, 5981 (dream), 5988 (flashback)
Lut Hannes	Angèle Backx	1999, 2004–2006, 2015–2018, 2019–2023, 2025, 2026	She is working as a barista on a cruise ship where Dirk used to work there.	622–702, 1700–2034, 3760–3800, 3889–3890, 3920–4028, 4056–4374, 4606–5515, 5976–5979, 6000 (voice)
Peter Decoster	head of the container park	2025	He is currently not appearing on screen.	5901, 5955–5956
Nele Devillé	Lesley	2025	She did not appear on screen at the moment, but is still Vince's boss at this moment.	5861, 5935–5936
Koo Van Damme (also appeared in E4066 in S22 in 2016 as Manager C-Group International and is currently one of the crew members of the soap)	The mayor	2025	Absconded after the wedding of Karin and Waldek.	5823, 5894, 5924
Lennart Lemmens	Stan Van Damme nr. 2	2019–2021, 2025	He currently serves in the Belgian army.	4618–5040, 5905–5913
Guido Henderickx	Various roles	2018, 2025	Appeared in S23 in 2018 as one of Renzo's creditors and in E5905 in S31 in 2025 as a hospital patient who is rude to Selin and uncooperative	?, 5905
Klaas Duyck	† Cédric Barry	2023–2025	Died in a fire at Lowie's house that he partly caused in E5894–5895. Cédric longed to be part of a family again after a traumatic childhood where he no longer had a family. However he became psychopathic. He wanted to continue his relationship with Marie, even though she refused. He planned a candlelit dinner with her in the house and held her hostage. But Vince found out and tried to save Marie while Cédric thought the two were in a relationship and was angry (he tried to kill Vince twice before). He fought with Vince around the candles and alcohol that started the fire, and when he returned to save Marie, he was hit on the head by a burning beam. Marie was unconscious but survived, and Vince also went to the hospital. Cédric was finally rescued from the building in E5895, but his death could only be confirmed. A shock and sadness for his former lover Emma and former friend Niels. (The fire was a reference to the fire in Eva, Werner and Maarten in E2220–2221 in S12–13 in 2007 and Cédric died like in Maarten by a burning beam.)	5514–5895
Season 31
Uncredited actor or extra	Glenn	2025	Absconded after the first wedding attempt of Karin and Waldek in the town hall was interrupted by an AI-video of Robin where Tom and Karin at first sight were having an affair and when Karin and Waldek were arrested on suspicion of the murder of Jean-Marc (who was stabbed to death by Karin and his corpse was dissolved by Waldek). He was the wedding planner of Karin and Waldek. Later, he was no longer involved in the final wedding.	5894 (mentioned earlier from 5842 since Karin and Waldek were engaged)
Peter Melis (also appeared in E4380 in S23 in 2018 as a priest for Zoë's baptism)	Chairman of the court	2023, 2025	Absconded after Vince's trial over his role in Abel's death and Vince was sentenced to wear an ankle monitor for 17 months. He is the same presiding judge as during the Waldek vs. the Feniks women trial in S28 and the Britt vs. Jean-Marc trial in S30. He made the decision that Waldek and the women of Feniks must cooperate or else the company would be dissolved which ultimately did not happen and later he sentenced Jean-Marc to 15 years in prison which also didn't happen as Jean-Marc planned an attack on Karin, stalked Britt and died after he was stabbed by Karin by accident.	5394–5399, 5789–5790, 5877
Johnny Delancker	Hall attendant	2025	Appeared once as a hall attendant during Vince's trial over his role in Abel's death	5877
Tinneke Bruyninckx (also a member of the crew as a set dresser)	Dresser	2025	Appeared once as a dresser who helped Karin try on wedding dresses for her wedding to Waldek in her villa when she was taken in by the police for questioning about Jean-Marc's disappearance after Britt made a statement to them. Britt did this so that Eddy wouldn't have to go to jail because according to Thilly he was the suspect, but he didn't know that Thilly lied to him so she hoped that Britt told the truth to the police that Karin had killed Jean-Marc.	5872
Jasper Heyman	Adam Amary	2024–2025	Left from Lowie's house after Niels broke up with him because he still desired to an open relationship and Niels confronted him kissing a drunken Cédric.	5715–5869
Mathias Vergels	Lowie Bomans nr. 2	2012–2025	Moved with Polly to the Azores where Polly's adoptive mother Rafaëlla is living so that Polly can grow up in her familiar environment and the two still live with each other. Polly was adopted by Rafaëlla after she was left behind by Bob during his escape from Belgium to Antigua while everyone thought she, Bob and Leo were dead by a bomb explosion in a boat placed by Bob that actually only killed Maureen.	3275–4030, 4069–4070, 4166–5861
Several baby's	Polly Bomans	2023–2024, 2025	Moved with Lowie to the Azores where her adoptive mother Rafaëlla is living so that she can grow up in her familiar environment and the two still live with each other. She was adopted by Rafaëlla after she was left behind by Bob during his escape from Belgium to Antigua while everyone thought she, Bob and Leo were dead by a bomb in a boat placed by Bob that actually only killed Maureen.	5483–5626, 5857–5861
Lie Hellemans	Nurse	2025	Appeared once as a nurse in the hospital where Tim heard the terrible news that Hannah was suffering from leukemia	5858
Tim Van Hoecke	Gène	2025	Absconded after he received a part of the debts from Marie and Andreas and he gives them 1 year for the rest. He maybe will return soon in S31.	5849–5854
Sepp Hendrix	Kerem	2025	Absconded after Robin left the orientation center while he stayed. He inspired Robin to invest in cryptocurrencies.	5849
Sébastien De Smet	Orientation center supervisor	2025	Absconded after Robin left the orientation center where he worked	5828–5849
Omar Ouali	Mohammed	2025	Absconded after Robin left the orientation center while he stayed	5829–5849
Artuur Engels	Yissin	2025	Returned home from the orientation center where Robin was also staying at the time	5829–5846
Sigi Van Roy	Freek	2025	Sent from the orientation center where Robin also stayed to a closed institution	5829–5846
Quinten Delaere	Partying student	2025	Appeared once as a partying student at Adam and Niels's party in the other part of Lowie's house	5840
Extra (uncredited man)	Car driver	2025	Appeared once uncredited as a car driver who accidentally hit Femke at the entrance of the police station while she was talking to Tim about the kiss and that the two didn't want to jeopardize their friendship. Femke then accidentally kissed Tim again, causing her to leave the street in shock without looking. Femke had to recuperate until about the end of S30.	5840
Marc De Vlieger & Klaar Deville	Architects	2025	Both appeared once as architects during a conversation with Peter and Andreas for the company Vlerick & Bomans when Andreas had difficulty being social and Peter, who saw the conversation as a test, promised to help him improve his social skills.	5838
Cato Peeters (MNM-dj) (also presenter with fiancé and MNM-colleague Sander Gillis of the weekly podcast Welkom Thuis (2024–ongoing))	Future bride (cameo)	2025	Appeared once as a future bride who got a strip act from Sunny in De Withoeve on her the bachelor party as a gift from her girlfriends, but was disappointed and she later even gave him a complaint that was rejected	5838
Sabine Goethals	Various roles including Ingrid (2025)	2010, 2025	Appeared in E2863–2866 in S16 in 2010 as head nurse Greet and appeared in E5817–5834 in S30 in 2025 as Ingrid, who took yoga classes with Lyn, met Eddy through a striptease act at Lyn's bachelor party in De Withoeve, helped him with further acts and who absconded after Eddy's strip act at the farmers' association.	2863–2866, 5817–5834
Tania Cnaepkens	Karima (Bakkel) nr. 2	2023, 2025	Absconded after Adil's funeral which took place off-camera in a mosque where Lyn and Christine were not welcome.	5390, 5400, 5475, 5825
Lena Majri	Zoë	2025	Absconded after the truth of the nude images done by Winnie was revealed. Later probably left the team.	5813–5825
Ellen Van Oudenhove	Winnie	2024–2025	Absconded after she was discovered as the real person behind the nude images in the women's soccer team of Anna in order to get Robin accused and arrested. Later Anna confirmed that she received a community service order from the juvenile court. Unknown if she is still a member of the team.	5752–5825
Nawfel Bardad-Daidj	† Adil Bakkal	2013–2025	Died of internal bleeding. He was furious when it turned out that his future wife Lyn had an affair with Lowie and wanted to take revenge through an act of desperation. He revealed the affair with footage during their marriage, kidnapped Lyn, lured Lowie to the shipyard that used to house Vita Puur, ACE, and De Kabouters, and tried to collapse the roof to kill them. The three and Waldek who tried to stop Adil got injured, Adil fled and said goodbye to Jaan and Christine and wanted to commit suicide by jumping from a roof. Lyn convinced him not to do it and the two wanted to give their relationship a second chance, but Adil succumbed to his injuries.	3444–5824
Stijn Gebruers	HR employee	2025	Appeared once as an HR employee who had to prepare a video of Adil at the town hall for his wedding to Lyn, but also contained images of the affair between Lyn and Lowie, which is part of Adil's act of desperation and attack on Lyn and Lowie.	5823 (midseason finale of S30)
Benno Enkels	Pizza delivery man	2025	Appeared once as a pizza delivery man who delivered a pizza to the hospital workers	5823 (midseason finale of S30)
Kenny Verelst	† Jean-Marc Weemaels	2024–2025	Accidentally fatally stabbed by Karin in her villa and his corpse was later dissolved by Waldek off-screen in E5810. Later appeared as a hallucination of Karin.	5673–5691, 5754, 5789–5810, from 5812 until 5817 as a hallucination
Hakim Chatar (also appeared in E5395 in S28 in 2023 as himself and returning BV-guest of the weekly podcast Welkom Thuis (2024-ongoing))	Thomas Smith Jr. (Junior)	2025	Hired by Lowie to find Polly after she was kidnapped by Bob and left behind by him before he arrived in Antigua. Last heard in a phone call with Lowie where he revealed to the latter that Marie called him and that she revealed to him that she had a relationship with Lowie's father Luc and that ended up with the birth of her son Andreas who is Lowie's half-brother. Later found Polly in the Azores where she was adopted by Rafaëlla and helped Lowie to get reunited with his daughter. Probably returned to Belgium after Lowie and Polly were reunited and his task was done.	5777, 5787 (voice), 5814 (voice)
Sofie Nickmans	Woman container park	2025	Absconded after Sunny returned the money to her after he and Vince discovered it in a closet belonging to an heiress of the woman she had taken to the container park and did not know about the money that was in there. Sunny originally wanted to use the money with Vince but Vince and later Sunny himself felt that giving it to her was better.	5807–5813
Yoeri Lewijze (also appeared in E1371–1454, 1485–1514 in S8–9 in 2003 as Jelle Cavens)	Kristof Baekelandt	2025	Arrested by the police for his role in the attack of Karin planned by Jean-Marc	5806–5809 (in 5794, he appeared covered)
Yannick Bruynincx (is also one of current directors of the soap since E5906 in S31 in 2025)	IT man	2025	Appeared once as an IT man who had to check the damage at Vlerick & Bomans after a cyber attack which was probably done by Green X-Treme (Adam). Later it turned out that Adil might be the perpetrator, since he secretly bullied Lowie and made sure that the blame fell on Green X-Treme. He did this after he found out about the affair between Lowie and his girlfriend Lyn and secretly became psychopathic and later decided to kill the two when it turned out that the affair didn't stop.	5805
Jeppe Van Haele	Kilian	2025	Absconded after he, Robin and the gang tried to attack Anna, but she pushed Robin to the ground, causing him to have a head wound and Kilian and the gang fled. Later Robin broke off contact with the gang.	5800
Tim Ost	Carlos Dille	2025	Absconded after Valentine's Day. He hasn't been to De Withoeve since then, Christine and Nancy abandoned their plans to pair him with Femke and the parent committee hasn't happened since then.	5784–5799
Rizlane Omarhi	Artemis Janssens	2024–2025	Absconded after transfer to permanent foster family with Anna's help after Fabian forced her out of the house due to an incident with Winnie at the Feniks wine barrels, with Robin, who was normally supposed to be watching the barrels, and the fact that she is a lesbian. Due to these events, her relationship with Winnie ended, and she no longer played for Anna's women's soccer team.	5752–5794
Mike Wauters	Olivier Das	2023, 2024, 2025	Absconded after the verdict of the case between Britt and Jean-Marc and his client Jean-Marc was sentenced to 15 years in prison. He also once worked in Alexander's office until his murder and supported him in his plans against De Decker-Bastiaens family at the time and tried to seduce Silke at the time, which clearly failed (the Wilhelm scream was used in E5445 when Silke kicked Olivier in the crotch).	?–5451, 5754, 5789–5790
Wouter De Clerck	Fabian Janssens	2025	Absconded after he kicked Artemis out of the house and an investigation was launched after it was discovered that he often physically attacked Artemis and is aggressive. It is unknown how the investigation was concluded and whether he got away with it or not.	5774–5786
Céline Malyster	Zahra Visine	2025	Absconded after Sam's treatment, arranged by Simonne, who believed Sam could still wake from her coma, but Frank and Tim thought Zahra was after her money. Last heard in a phone call with Frank, which confirmed his theory.	5773–5776, 5778 (voice)
Steven Verboven	Various roles	2014, 2017, 2024–2025	Appeared in E3514 in S19 in 2014 as a waiter in a cafe where Julia and Luc had a drink, appeared in E4144 in S22 in 2017 together with Jan Van Gool as CEOs who both had a business meeting with Tom and Karin in Advocaten De Decker en Baert and appeared in E5762–5777 in S30 in 2024–2025 as the doctor who unfortunately had to break the news that Sam would not wake up from her coma and eventually had to pull the plug. (Rudi Giron was also listed in the credits as the doctor, but this appears to be an error in the credits.)	3514, 4144, 5762–5777
An Vanderstighelen	† Sam De Witte	2013–2025	Died of brain trauma in the hospital after a heavy blow to the head by Lieven in the school she worked. She fell into a coma in E5760–5761, in E5769 it was revealed that she would never wake up again and in E5777 the plug was pulled.	3437–4604, 4724–5777
Lena Van Deynze	Annelies	2025	Absconded after Lowie broke up with her because he secretly continued to search for clues of where Polly was and whether she was still alive and wanted to focus on that. He started an affair with Lyn to help them through their difficult times and to alleviate his stress about the search for Polly, which yielded no results, and perhaps he couldn't cope with the fact that other people (like Adil) were happy again after Bob's desperate act.	5772–5776
Hannelore Vanthuyne	Sarah	2024–2025	Absconded. She wasn't seen playing in Anna's women soccer team anymore after her last appearance.	5752–5772
Pascal Boyen	Car driver	2025	Appeared once as a car driver who accidentally hit Emma on her bicycle at night. Cédric, her boyfriend at the time, witnessed the accident as a paramedic. Emma then had to spend a few days recovering.	5772
Monique Ryngaert	Ceramics student	2025	Appeared once as a student of Simonne who was in Bar Madam for the ceramics, but got into an argument with Lyn while she was having a hard time when the ties with Tim and Hannah were completely cut after what happened to Sam and Lieven	5769
Wim Danckaert (also appeared in E579–580 in S4 in 1999 as Jos and in E1631–1640, 1706–1745, 2428–2565, 2597–2598 in S10, 14 in 2004–2005, 2008–2009 as Sylvain Geens)	† Lieven Cremers	2024	Died after Hannah threw a smartphone on his face which caused him to fell from the stairs of Tim's mansion and broke his neck. Before that, he tried to strangle Simonne because she confronted him about what he had done to Sam and he still seemed aggressive, now that he knew that his chance of becoming part of Tim's family again had been completely ruined.	5735–5766
Jonah Flachet	Luca	2024	He has a relationship with Yasmine and is mentioned but doesn't appear on-screen so far after E5763. He will return soon in S31.	5697, 5746–5763
Marie Robyns (also appeared in E4508–4548 in S24 in 2018–2019 as Sandrine De Decker who she also played before as one of the several children)	† Anouk Cremers	2024	Appeared in a flashback in E5759 from Tim's and Lyn's teenage years. Died after being pushed by an angry Lyn off the boat in the cold water which caused her heartbeat to stop. Mentioned many times in the present.	5759 (flashback)
Remi De Smet	Mats Thijsen	2024	Absconded after his bad report evaluation with Sam is interrupted by Lyn and he left.	5636–5700, 5741–5759
Niels De Boeck	Frank Cruysberghs	2024	Appeared once as Frank Cruysberghs, a social worker who visited De Withoeve for a conversation with Femke in which he told her that Peter had filed a complaint because of her previous bad behavior which ended with Vic being injured after being hit by a car.	5755
Sherinne Bouchaala	Jamilah	2024	Absconded after a visit to Yasmine and where she discovered that the misunderstanding between Yasmine and Luca has been resolved and they are in love	5746–5753
Laurie Bauwens	Very pregnant woman	2024	Appeared once as a heavily pregnant woman who gave birth to her child after 27 weeks and then suffered blood loss and had to go to the hospital.	5753
Dirk Mareel	Doctor	2024	Appeared once as a doctor after Vic was hit by a car when he got out of Femke's car because he missed Peter. Femke hadn't been behaving well during that period.	5750
Dirk Couvent	Ambulance driver	2024	Both appeared once when Vic was taken to the hospital with injuries after being hit by a car after he got out of Femke's car because he missed Peter. Femke hadn't been behaving well during that period.	5749
David Lenaerts	Doctor	2024	Both appeared once when Vic was taken to the hospital with injuries after being hit by a car after he got out of Femke's car because he missed Peter. Femke hadn't been behaving well during that period.	5749
Lynn Van den Broeck	Viv Van Rooy	2019–2024	Moved to Berlin for her new job at Green X-Treme after she had to close Vita Puur due to the construction plans of her ex Lowie and Peter and Adam helped her with her new job	4679–4900, 4939–5749
Yemi Oduwale	Dries Van Aken (born as Kim Vandenabeelen)	2018–2024	Moved with Tamara and Leo. At the time of their departure, he was engaged to Tamara and expecting their first child together, a sibling for Leo (a reference to Eva and Werner's departure from S13). Last seen when he resigned from Karin after many arguments.	4435–5743
Ivana Noa	Silke Le Grand	2021–2024	Moved to The Hague for good after she felt good there and then had a new love.	5055–5742
Pascal Van Nuffel	Client	2024	Appeared once as a client of Dries's whom Karin had to take over because Dries was late. This was because Dries had to care for Tamara now that she was pregnant. Karin saw that this was no reason for Dries to be late, and as a result of this and other discussions, Dries resigned from Karin's law firm.	5741
Xander De Rycke (stand-up comedian)	Himself (cameo)	2024	Both appeared once to make videos with Waldek after he became popular through Robin's videos	5739
Nona Van Braeckel (Studio Brussel presenter)	Herself (cameo)	2024	Both appeared once to make videos with Waldek after he became popular through Robin's videos	5739
Nicky Langley (also appeared in E2327–2347 in S13 in 2008 as Cecile (Cyriel) and in E3601 in S20 in 2014 as consultant Child Focus)	Nadine	2024	Absconded. She meanwhile left the hospital off-screen.	5734–5738
Alain Stepman	Various roles	2023, 2024	Appeared in E5475 (S28 finale) in S28 in 2023 as an emergency doctor who had to examine Tamara and the unborn child (Polly) after she became unwell and Tamara turned out to have pre-eclampsia. Appeared in E5737 in S30 in 2024 as a financier who had a business meeting with Peter at Vlerick & Bomans when Vic suddenly showed up at the door.	5475, 5737
Dirk De Roeck & Liliane Vranckx	Couple	2024	Both appeared once as a couple who normally both stayed overnight at De Withoeve but left after one night due to Femke's bad behavior and when she celebrated her victory in court with Sunny at night.	5732–5733
Arno Moens	Philippe Haegemans	2018–2019, 2022, 2023, 2024	Absconded but he is still working in Christine's school until now	4464–4496, 4607, 4633, 4658–4659, 4694, 5340, 5503–5507, 5718–5732
Vanessa Debleyser	Pascale	2024	Appeared once as Pascale who was talking with Simonne and Lyn about setting up a pottery studio, and Lyn and Pascale agreed that it would be the best decision for Simonne. Later, Eddy, who was looking for a wife, tried to attract Pascale, causing her and Simonne to leave Bar Madam.	5732
Aza Declercq	The judge	2024	Appeared once during the trial between Femke and Peter about whether Vic should be forced to change schools	5731
Jef Herrijgers	Nurse	2024	Appeared once as a nurse who was called by Eddy when he discovered that his money was stolen from his wallet (by Robin), but when it turned out that there was only 10 euros in it, the nurse only made a report and the case was already closed	5730–5731
Marijntje Van Damme	Various roles	2023, 2024	Appeared in E5351–5355 in S28 in 2023 as mother 2 who, along with other parents, were against Peter because they thought he was a pedophile because of Vince's words, which he received through information from Alexander, but it turned out to be a lie and Vince apologized. Alexander said that in order to get revenge on Peter and his friends. Appeared in E5725–5727 in S30 in 2024 as healthcare professional Lisa, who cared for Eddy in the hospital and kept an eye on him. Eddy had ended up in hospital after a heart attack.	5351–5355, 5725–5727
Grethel Peeters	Yogi	2024	Appeared once as a yogi taking yoga classes with Lyn at Vita Puur. Viv asked Lyn to have her yogis sign the petition to save Vita Puur from Vlerick & Bomans' construction plans. Lyn promised but forgot.	5726
Marc Ruyssinck	Customer	2024	Appeared once as a customer who wanted to order wine at Feniks but left because Femke was too busy calling Sunny	5725
Tine Priem	Tamara Vereken	2016–2024	Moved with Dries and Leo. At the time of their departure, she was engaged to Dries and expecting their first child together, a sibling for Leo (a reference to Eva and Werner's departure from S13).	3947–5725
Several children including Amélie Munters as baby (2019)	Leo Vereken	2019–2024	Moved with Tamara and Dries. At the time of their departure, Tamara and Dries were engaged and their expecting their first child together, a sibling for Leo (a reference to Eva, Werner, Julie and Nand's departure from S13).	4665–5626, 5679 (voice), 5693–5724
Mark Verbruggen	Cleaner	2024	He once appeared as a hospital cleaner who tried to teach Robin so he could start his hospital job. Robin was given community service by the juvenile court judge after being involved with Gregory and his gang selling drugs, but was fired after he was caught trying to sell laughing gas to Mats and secretly giving alcohol to Nadine, who was addicted to it.	5724
Sammy Bruggeman	Fireman	2024	Appeared once during the drop in which he and his team with Cédric, Emma, Anna, Judith, Eddy, and Tom, participated. The drop didn't go entirely smoothly when Eddy suffered a heart attack, but was resuscitated by Tom.	5723
Sebastian Dehond (credited as Sebastiaan Dehond)	Viktor (friend of Robin)	2024	He visited Robin in Tom's rent villa with two other friends to drink, which led to them and Robin were getting drunk and made noises at night. The friends were sent home by the police, while Robin's behavior worsened as a result.	5723
Patrick Puttenaers	Customer	2024	Appeared once as a customer	5718
Karin Tanghe	† Veerle Vanhoof	2014–2015, 2017–2019, 2022–2024	Died in the nursing home due to dementia and old age with her adopted daughter Sam, Tim and Hannah as witnesses. She had been staying there since Chris's last actions and death. Her voice can be heard when Sam later reads a short letter from her.	3665–3678, 3723, 3774, 3830–3832, 3874–3880, 4284, 4315–4318, 4362, 4596–4598, 4724, 5240–5438, 5707–5709, 5710 (voice)
Karel Janzen	Rayan	2024	Arrested and suspended from school after he attacked Therese with a knife	5636–5708
Brecht Haentjens	Otis	2024	Absconded after the confrontation between Rayan and Sunny	5636–5708
Silvio Vandebeek	Joris	2024	Absconded after the confrontation between Rayan and Sunny	5708
Berthe Tanwo Njole	Annette Addo	2024	Absconded after Therese moved to Sunny and Annette is allowed to keep her child benefit.	5658, 5685–5700
Saar Niragire De Groof	Sasha Bergmann	2024	Absconded after Tamara and Leo were reunited in Antigua and after she revealed to Lowie that Bob never had arrived with Polly here	5690–5698
Femke Van Dael	Date Adil	2024	Appeared once as a date for Adil who was looking for new happiness but the two were not a match. Lyn then showed interest in Adil and the two started a relationship.	5696
Frits De Ruyter	Robin Bomans nr. 2	2019–2024	Temporarily to Morocco to visit Aïsha and Youssef because of the tensions caused by Gregory and his gang and Eve and replaced by actor Kobe Debie	4714–5563, 5617–5687
Lore Goeyvaerts	Amelie Cosyns	2023–2024	Absconded after Marianne's trial for her role in Alexander's death and when Marianne was sentenced to 3 years suspended prison sentence	5544–5545, 5679–5685
Anik Vandercruyssen	Nathalie (Cosyns)	2022–2024	Absconded after Marianne's trial for her role in Alexander's death and when Marianne was sentenced to 3 years suspended prison sentence	5303, 5369, 5529–5545, 5600–5606, 5648–5685
Celia Bogaert	Chairwoman of the court (Marianne's trial)	2023, 2024	Absconded after Marianne's trial for her role in Alexander's death and when Marianne was sentenced to 3 years suspended prison sentence	5544–5545, 5679–5685
Lies Klinkers (also appeared in E3754 in S20 in 2015 as the doctor when Adil was allowed to leave the hospital and is currently one of the crew members of the soap)	Chairwoman of the court	2013, 2014, 2015, 2018, 2023, 2024	Absconded after Marianne's trial for her role in Alexander's death and when Marianne was sentenced to 3 years suspended prison sentence. She was often the judge in the characters' lawsuits.	3389–3390, 3418–3423, 3589–3590, 3860, 4340–4341, 4395, 5449–5450, 5639–5645, 5679–5685
Jan De Beus	Various roles	2011, 2014, 2024	Appeared in E3069 in S17 in 2011 as Mr. Debakker, who, together with his wife (Reinhilde De Snacken) and the Janssens couple (Miel Van Hasselt & Rita Van De Velde), were swingers who got along well with Marianne and Geert at the opening of Zus & Zo. Appeared in E3589 in S19 in 2014 as a bailiff during the lawsuit between Ann and Marianne about who should own the mansion. Appeared in E5679–5685 in S29–30 in 2024 as the jury spokesperson in Marianne's trial for her role in Alexander's death and when Marianne was sentenced to 3 years suspended prison sentence.	3069, 3589, 5679–5685
Frank De Kaey	Various roles including Journalist (2024)	2005, 2024	Appeared in S11 in 2005 as Real Estate Agent Polspoel and in S29-30 in 2024 as the journalist at Marianne's assize trial.	1854, 1860, 5675, 5679–5680, 5684–5685
Bas Van Weert	† Abel Nauwelaers	2023–2024	Died after being pushed unconscious by Vince at the entrance of the apartment where he lived in E5683 who later dumped him in panic in a creek where he drowned. This happened when Eddy and Vince tried to get Britt away from Abel because they think he did something terrible to her, but he refused and worked against them. Their suspicions were immediately confirmed because Abel had Britt drugged and had her abused and raped by his friends, including Jean-Marc. Emma and Therese were unknowingly also victims of Abel and his friend group as they own nude images of them.	5559–5683
Laila Marien	Yoga teacher	2024	She once appeared on Vita Puur to teach yoga to Niels and Viv. Later, Thilly became the yoga teacher, and finally, it became Lyn.	5681
Yente Goeyvaerts	Eve Cosyns	2023–2024	Arrested after tried to shoot Marianne at the courthouse, but ended up shooting Karin. She was also revealed to be the real perpetrator of bullying and threatening De Decker-Bastiaens family.	5544–5545, 5679–5680 (in 5664, she appeared off-screen and in 5670, she appeared covered)
Season 30
Andres Doise	Gregory	2024	Arrested alongside his gang off-camera by police for being drug dealers and users and possessing a real weapon. He and his group were also suspected of bullying and threatening De Decker-Bastiaens family, which was actually done by Eve.	5638–5679
Rauna	Agent	2024	Appeared in E5573 when the real person who hit Katy Mertens with her car and committed hit and run confessed to the facts and appeared in E5679 with Tim when Gregory and Vanessa were arrested and drugs had been discovered.	5573, 5679
Chloé Henry	Vanessa	2024	Arrested along with Gregory and the gang for being drug dealers and users and possessing a real weapon.	5679
Uncredited actor or extra	Stijn Vanthournhout	2024	Fled after Gregory and Vanessa were arrested by Tim and Dieter and he took the weapon. Tim and Dieter discovered that Stijn was a former inmate convicted of weapons possession. He was also previously arrested on suspicion of assault, battery, and torture. The two realised that Robin is in danger and at the same time someone tried to ring the doorbell at the front door in Karin's villa where Robin was now. In S30, it was revealed that Tim and Dieter were at the front door while later good news came: Stijn was discovered and also arrested.	5679
Myriam Mulder (also appeared in E3125–3127 in S17 in 2012 as Anja)	Carla (called Chloé by Eddy)	2024	Absconded after the failed 'date' with Eddy at Bar Madam. Eddy felt lonely, so Rosa, who was worried about him, decided to contact him digitally as Chloé, but when he wanted to meet her in real life on a date, Rosa and Simonne lured Carla as the woman on the date, which made the date a fiasco and Eddy never realized who Chloé really was. Later Carla became friends with Simonne off-screen through their interest in pottery.	5664–5665
Bram Kelchtermans	Mr. Russo	2024	Absconded after a meeting with Peter and Lowie about their project, and later when the assignment was completed off-screen, Lowie behaved well at the meeting despite being depressed and secretly used drugs after Polly's "death" at the hands of Bob.	5584, 5590, 5645
Christophe Haddad	† Bob Sleeckx	2015–2024	Fled with Leo and Polly. In E5626, 5627 and 5629 he can be seen again with flashbacks and video images. Later revealed in S30 that he fled to Antigua with Leo, left Polly behind in the Azores during his escape and died in a sailboat accident. He was dead not so long before E5679.	3845–5629
Tania Poppe	† Maureen	2024	Murdered by Bob in E5625–5626 who blew up her boat with her on it in order to everyone believed he killed himself and Leo and Polly in an act of desperation but actually fled with the two children. She was terminally ill at the time.	5611–5626
Hetty Helsmoortel	customer Vita Puur	2024	Appeared once as a customer Vita Puur when Viv had a good and busy day	5612
Leo De Clippeleir	Various roles	2021, 2022, 2024	Appeared in E4937 in S26 in 2021 as a customer of Bar Madam where Angèle tried to sell her cookies to get money for Frank and Simonne, but he angrily revealed that they were inedible, which Angèle then realised: Eddy had made them wrong. Appeared in E5313 in S28 in 2022 as a customer of Bar Madam who was kind to Angèle this time. Appeared in E5611 in S29 in 2024 as a man who flirted with Simonne while she and Rosa were enjoying in a cafe which made Frank briefly jealous.	4937, 5313, 5611
Aaron De Groeve	Gaby Fontaine	2023–2024	Absconded after Silke's overdose and a good conversation with Nancy. He was sad because Britt broke up with him because of Abel and started dating Silke. He knew that his ex Cédric was using drugs and wanted to try it with Silke for the first time, but it turned out that they had been poisoned. Last seen in a video where he urged his fans to never take drugs.	5412–5610
Ilse De Rauw	Various roles including Lieve De Vos (2019) and Ine (2021)	2007–2008, 2019, 2021, 2024	Appeared in E2306–2308 in S13 in 2007–2008 as psychiatric nurse, appeared in E4541 & 4546 in S24 in 2019 as oenologist Lieve De Vos, appeared in E4970 in S26 in 2021 as Ine and appeared in E5584 in S29 in 2024 as customer Vita Puur	2306–2308, 4541, 4546, 4970, 5584
Wanda Joosten	Gerda Thys	2022–2024	Absconded after the tensions had passed because of Chris and his accomplice John and daughter Maité, but she is still working in the police station and mentioned until now	5250–5569
Charlotte Boudry	Lieselot	2024	Rejected by Lowie after a failed date.	5562–5565
Anneke van Hooff	† Katy Mertens ('Sofia Ledoux')	2023	Originally thought to have died after a SM game with Waldek in E5560. Later revealed to be Katy Mertens, the sister of Filip, the man Vince killed 10 years ago then. The real Sofia was the judge who in Katy's believe gave Vince a too little punishnment. She actually faked her death. She killed Sofia and dumped her remains in Feniks in order to get Vince arrested but died in a car accident.	5538–5560
Bram Spooren	Ilias Pauwels	2021–2023	Moved to rehabilitation center which is locating close to the border with Germany. He misbehaved since he got out of prison and ended up losing a leg in a motorcycle accident.	5052–5550
Sara Gracia Santacreu	Maité Santens	2023	Absconded after she revealed in the hospital to Dieter that her unborn child that died from a shot by Tim wasn't from him and she lied and manipulated him the whole time. The father of her child is unknown. Later arrested by the police for the crimes she committed with her father Chris before his death including helped him murdering Harry and indirectly killing Patje and later tried to murder Thilly. She also killed John.	5381–5532
Xavier Baeyens	Various roles including the prosecutor in legal cases with Alexander as judge (2022)	2019, 2022, 2023	Appeared uncredited in E4600 in S24 in 2019 as Merckpoels, a client of Judith's doctor's office who had a conversation with Thilly, appeared in E5266–5274 in 28 in 2022 as the attorney during Judith's trial against Robrecht's parents and later a trial in which Dries, as a lawyer, believed that the opposing party was being punished far too severely by Alexander, who was a racist. Appeared in E5376 also in S28 in 2023 as the fire chief during the fire at Harry's house caused by a gas explosion that later turned out to be caused by Chris, and appeared in E5524 in S29 in 2023 as an ambulance driver who took Thilly and Maité to the hospital after their confrontation and the police who came after Maité's real identity as Chris's daughter and accomplice was discovered.	4600, 5266–5268, 5270, 5274, 5376, 5524
Jozefien Grossen	Glenn	2023	Absconded after Lowie and Polly posed together for the newborn photo shoot with Glenn as photographer. Glenn had been an acquaintance of Paulien's during her stay in America, and Paulien had hired her for the newborn photo shoot before she died.	5513, 5519
Christof De Bruyn	Various roles including Jokke (2023)	2018, 2023	Appeared in S23 in 2018 as Jurgen Delvaux, a business partner of Lowie, and in S29 in 2023 as Jokke, Vince's creditor.	4340, 4344, 5507, 5512, 5515
Arthur Decock	Journalist Joris	2023	Absconded after Ilias had a newspaper interview with him about how he was suspected of murdering Alexander while Tom and the real perpetrator Marianne remained silent and saw the interview as an opportunity to take revenge on them.	5500–5515
Ron Cornet	Dirk Vermeersch	2022, 2022–2023	Absconded after he helped Angèle find a job as barista on a cruise ship where he used to work. In approximately E5777 he had a phone call with Frank, which revealed that Dirk has still contact with him and maybe others.	5194–5213, 5273–5513
Freek De Craecker	Felix Sterckens	2023	Absconded after Ilias was released. Ilias was in prison because he was suspected of Alexander's murder. But Felix used tricks so that Dries realized that Marianne had murdered Alexander and reported her. Dieter also realized at the same time that Marianne had murdered Alexander.	5496–5507
Vroni Boyen	Various roles	2011, 2012, 2013, 2015, 2023	Appeared in E2948–2949 in S16 in 2011 as the judge during Tom's trial against Bianca and Mo, appeared in E3144–3145 in S17 in 2012 as public prosecutor's office during Guy's trial for the murder of Fien, appeared in E3375 in S18 in 2013 as master of ceremonies, appeared in E3749 in S20 in 2015 as official, appeared in E3853 in S21 in 2015 as psychologist and appeared in E5493 in S29 in 2023 as the court supervisor who must finally assess whether or not Feniks should be dissolved which didn't happen.	2948–2949, 3144–3145, 3375, 3749, 3853, 5493
Season 29
Wim De Pauw	† John	2022, 2023	Shot by Maité and died on the spot so that her true identity as daughter and henchwoman of his boss and her father Chris wouldn't be discovered. John helped Chris with his plans in S27.	c. 5202–5256, 5260 (nightmare of Tim), 5462–5475
Erik Goossens	† Alexander Cosyns	2022–2023	Murdered by Marianne (he was found murdered in E5450 but a new flashback in E5474–5475 revealed it was done by Marianne). Alexander had a feud with the De Decker-Bastiaens family and their friends after Marianne exposed him as a racist and lost his job as judge. After failed lawsuits where he, as a lawyer, took on Tom and Peter, he became more successful in his revenge plan by putting drugs in Robin's backpack, leaking the secret to a journalist that Walter De Decker had raped a minor Tania in the past and urging Silke to prosecute Dries. All of this caused Marianne to confront him and ended up with her fatally hitting him with a golf club in his office.	5247–5451, 5474–5475 (flashback)
Mathieu Carpentier	Joren De Witte	2017–2023	Moved to USA to take a job there with uncle Jan and started a new chapter of his life after several setbacks, including recent ones such as the death of his mother, Veerle's dementia and Niels secretly dating other men.	4303–5473
Sofia Zaifri	Zihame Peeters-Amrani	2021–2023	Moved to Switzerland with Nora not long after Harry's death and funeral	4937–5470
Jonathan Lambrechts	Arjan Naegels	2023	Absconded after his session with Bob in Lowie's house. Bob had been feeling mentally unwell recently because Tamara was performing surrogacy for Lowie, yet she still connected with the then-unborn child. Lowie saw him more as family, which led Bob to believe their friendship was in jeopardy. This led to the demise of their company, Boowie. The sessions with Arjan didn't change the situation, so he tried to find other solutions, which happened too quickly and later led to the divorce from Tamara and a strained friendship with Lowie and chaos between his ex Christine and her husband Adil. Ultimately, this led to the events of the midseason finale in S29 (E5625).	5467
Bob Peeters (Down the road (Belgian reality TV-show)-participant)	Hospital assistant (cameo)	2023	Appeared once as a hospital assistant, who was working in the background while Nancy visited Marianne in the hospital after she suffered a heart attack due to the incident with Alexander, who broke the news of Tania's rape by Walter. Later, it turned out she secretly murdered Alexander the same day before the heart attack.	5453
Chloé Beniest	Marthe	2023	Absconded after she tried to help her classmate Robin and his family as a witness to an incident involving Alexander putting drugs in Robin's backpack. Their plan to have Alexander arrested by the police could not be carried out because Alexander was later found murdered in his office.	5430–5449
Amara Reta	Nora Amrani	2021–2023	Moved to Switzerland with Zihame not long after Harry's death and funeral	4943–5445
Bart Van den Eynde (also appeared in E500 in S4 in 1998 as the municipal secretary and in E1140 in S7 in 2002 as mayor Raymond Sorel)	Victor Stiers	2023	Absconded after he and his lawyer Alexander lost the lawsuit against Ilias (Ilias only had to pay a fine and did not receive a prison sentence for injuries)	5381 (voice), 5382–5440
Tylaine Van den Broeck	Various roles	2010, 2023	Appeared in E2867–2868 in S16 in 2010 as the gynecologist who revealed to Peggy that she had to undergo further investigation (a laparoscopy to start with) because there was a chance she had ovarian cancer. Appeared in E5339–5440 in S28 in 2023 as the chairwoman in de court in the Ilias vs. Stiers trial who decided not to jail Ilias, but that Ilias only had to pay a fine.	2867–2868, 5439–5440
Riadh Bahri (VRT NWS journalist)	Himself (cameo)	2023	Appeared twice, first in E5394 in the hospital in the background during the conversation with Judith and Sam and second in E5432 on TV during VRT NWS Journaal Laat about the news that Chris and Harry are both dead. (Chris forced Harry to inject a deadly poison into his arm, then shot Harry dead after he refused to do the same to him while Chris put himself to sleep forever.)	5394, 5432
Danny Timmermans	† Chris Geerinckx	2021–2022, 2023, Tim undercover last episode (2022) (voice)	Died after lethal injection in the remains of the first café he ran with Harry when they were still 'blood brothers'. Chris committed multiple crimes, including being a drug lord, working illegally, lying and manipulating Harry by claiming he had murdered Anouk, which turned out to be a lie, being indirectly responsible for Tania's death, attempted murders of Tim and Dieter, attempted kidnapping of Hannah, bullying Harry, stealing Harry's weapon and gave it to a confused Veerle so that she shot at the Cremers' house, attempting to murder Thilly, murdering Patje, and kidnapping and murdering Harry. John was his accomplice and helped him in his plans in S27 and his daughter Maité helped him in his last plans in S28. Chris also had an incurable brain tumor which caused him to come back 'resurrected'.	5098–5255, 5260 (nightmare of Tim), 5415–5432
Stan Van Samang	† Harry Peeters	2020–2023	Shot dead by Chris in the remains of the first café he ran with Chris when they were still 'blood brothers'. Later revealed that Maité also helped Chris in his last plans and she is partly responsible for Harry's death.	4923–5432
Gunter Reniers	† Patrick 'Patje' Berghmans	2022–2023	Died due to explosion of a police van at the police station parking lot by a bomb placed by Chris and Maité which was supposed to kill Tim and Dieter.	5242–5430
Knarf Van Pellecom (also appeared in E657–664 in S5 in 1999 as Doctor Cuppens and is currently one of the crew members of the soap)	The mayor	2010, 2011, 2012, 2015, 2017, 2019, 2020, 2021, 2022, 2023	Absconded after the wedding of Adil and Christine. Meanwhile, replaced by another mayor.	2760, 2794, 2833, 2994–2995, 3200, 3290, 3749, 4300, 4664–4665, 4671, 4829, 4949, 5040, 5234–5235, 5400
Jolien Roets (Qmusic presenter)	Herself (cameo)	2023	Both appeared once as customers of Bar Madam	5395
Hakim Chatar (dj) (also appeared in E5777, 5787 (voice) & 5814 (voice) in S30 in 2025 as Thomas Smith Jr. (Junior) and returning BV-guest of the weekly podcast Welkom Thuis (2024–ongoing))	Himself (cameo)	2023	Both appeared once as customers of Bar Madam	5395
Fien Germijns & Thibault Christiaensen (Studio Brussel presenters)	Customers (cameo)	2023	Both appeared once as Tom's customers from Advocaten De Decker	5393
Herman Brusselmans (novelist)	Himself (cameo)	2023	Appeared once to give a lecture at De Withoeve and he knew Dirk from their younger years	5392
Metejoor (singer)	Himself (cameo)	2023	Appeared once when Christine, Viv, Tamara and Thilly were visiting a concert of him for Christine's bachelor party and Christine got a moment to talk with him.	5391
Tom Viaene	Various roles	2016, 2023	Appeared in E3945 in S21 in 2016 as Peggy's lawyer during an interrogation with Tim and Dieter about the murder of Lucas and the attempted murder of Femke with the sabotaged van, and when she was subsequently arrested as a suspect, Eddy later turned out to be the van's saboteur because he thought Peggy was going to drive it. Appeared in E5351–5355 in S28 in 2023 as a father who, along with other parents, were against Peter because they thought he was a pedophile because of Vince's words, which he received through information from Alexander, but it turned out to be a lie and Vince apologized. Alexander said that in order to get revenge on Peter and his friends.	3945, 5351–5355
Xandra Van Welden	Various roles including Sarah Volders (2013) and Krista De Cooman (2014)	2013, 2014, 2019, 2023	Appeared in E3402, 3418–3423 in S19 in 2013 as Meester Sarah Volders during the fraud case and false boiler that caused the death of Jack Schepers with Luc as responsible, appeared in E3582–3590 in S19 in 2014 as Lawyer Krista De Cooman during the investigation and trial into Kurt's death, appeared in E4671 in S25 in 2019 as Annie Van Der Heyden, who bought the Frens and appeared in E5351–5355 in S28 in 2023 as mother 1 who, along with other parents, were against Peter because they thought he was a pedophile because of Vince's words, which he received through information from Alexander, but it turned out to be a lie and Vince apologized. Alexander said that in order to get revenge on Peter and his friends.	3402, 3418–3423, 3582–3590, 4671, 5351–5355
Lotte Vannieuwenborg	Katrien Snackaert	2008–2013, 2015, 2022	Returned to her family in Hong Kong after Paulien's funeral	2325–3292, 3749–3755, 5296–5340
Tina Maerevoet	† Paulien Snackaert	2008–2012, 2013–2022, also played a role in podcast audio series Ik, Karin (2020)	Fell on a glass table and later died from her injuries in the hospital. She tested Boowie's VR escape room with Tamara and Judith, with Lowie and Bob as supervisors in the warehouse of De Withoeve, but the night before Robin and Zihame broke in to test it and left mud trails behind, so Vicky had to clean up the warehouse, but Lowie didn't tell her that the objects for the game had to be in exactly the same place, including the glass table. Paulien fell due to a surprise moment in the animation on the glass table that was placed incorrectly, causing part of the glass to pierce her carotid artery. Her death was ruled an accident and the VR escape room was sold to Sacoor Tronics, which also meant that this was Boowie's last major project before Bob, at his request, closed down the company for other reasons at the end of S28.	2325–3215, 3438–5335
Ellen Van de Poel	† Elke Rottiers	2022	Died of cirrhosis of the liver in the hospital in E5330. Elke came up again after Veerle, due to her dementia, mistook Simonne for Elke, who was the mother of Joren who abandoned him during a difficult period and originally never contacted her son again, even after Bill's death. Because of this confusion, Sam thought that Veerle was confronted again by Elke after she left Joren and Sam went to investigate. She discovered that Elke was in the hospital on the verge of dying from liver cirrhosis caused by the alcohol and it turned out that Elke tried to contact Joren after Bill's death but was sent away by Veerle with a lie that Joren did not want to see her. When Sam confronted Veerle with this and Joren just found out the truth it was too late because Elke lost hope of being reunited with her son.	5327–5329
Frank Deboosere (VRT weatherman)	Himself (voice)	2022	His voice was heard when Tom, Peter, and Dries were the first to test Boowie's VR escape room in the warehouse of De Withoeve. Deboosere was hired off-screen by Lowie and Bob to deliver an opening message in his role as weatherman.	5327 (voice)
Wim De Vilder (VRT NWS journalist)	Himself (voice)	2015, 2022	His voice can be heard on TV during VRT NWS Journaal about the news that Danny escaped during his transport from the Assize Court to prison and there was no trace and years later that Alexander resigned as judge after Marianne's viral audio clip revealed he was a racist	3860 (voice), 5309 (voice)
Marc Verbruggen	Various roles	2002, 2006, 2012, 2016, 2022,	Appeared in E1216 in S7 in 2002 as Veronique's gynecologist, in 1971–1974, 1985 en 1995 in S11 in 2006 as Curator Peter Devuyst, appeared in E3205 in S18 in 2012 as Surgeon/Doctor Marcourt, appeared in E4021, 4022 & 4025 in S21 in 2016 as Mr. Timmermans and appeared in E5292, 5294 & 5295 in S28 in 2022 as notary André Capiot.	1974, 1995, 3205, 4021, 4025, 5292, 5294, 5295,
Rania Gaaloul	Saskia	2022	Absconded after Lowie and Paulien were given permission to start surrogacy as a couple	5288–5293
Tuur Roels	Wannes	2022	Rejected by Thilly who had an open relationship with Harry	5289
Theo Van Baarle	Various roles including Marcel (2008) and Professor Celis (2022)	2008, 2009, 2011, 2022	Appeared in E2392–2406 in S13 in 2008 as Marcel, a worker of Taxi Ter Smissen who resigned because he could no longer cope with Frank's behaviour. Appeared in E2559 in S14 in 2009 as a friend of Kris' and Bruno's father who attended his funeral. Appeared in E3068–3072 in S17 in 2011 as Harry, Guy's neighbor. Appeared in E5274–5284 in S28 in 2022 as Professor Celis, a teacher of Niels who has knowledge of wine and helped with the harvest in Stevenson, but unfortunately had to confirm that the harvest was ruined because fruit flies had inoculated the vinegar bacteria into the juice.	2392–2406, 2559, 3068–3072, 5274–5284
Lotte Mariën	Ms. Linde Van Parys	2022	Absconded after Judith's trial against Robrecht's parents in which there was doubt as to whether she could save Robrecht or whether it was impossible. Judith was acquitted on all counts. She and Jan were the lawyers of Robrecht's parents.	5266–5270
Eric Kerremans (also appeared in E4255–4268 in S23 in 2017 as Antonio)	Mr. Jan Cools	2022	Absconded after Judith's trial against Robrecht's parents in which there was doubt as to whether she could save Robrecht or whether it was impossible. Judith was acquitted on all counts. He and Linde were the lawyers of Robrecht's parents.	5266–5270
Hans Van den Stock	Various roles including † Jeweler Santens (2006)	1999, 2003, 2004, 2006, 2012–2013, 2022	Most known roles were in E1986–1990 in S11 in 2006 as Jeweler Santens who was shot dead by Manfred during a robbery at his villa and in E3283, 3299–3312, 3415, 3480 in S18–19 in 2012–2013 as the school principal. Also appeared in E741 in S5 in 1999 as a café owner, in E1465 in S9 in 2003 as a presenter, in E1670 in S10 in 2004 as appraiser Van Dam and in E5261 in S28 in 2022 as a funeral director during Kobe's funeral.	741, 1465, 1670, 1986–1990, 3283, 3299–3312, 3415, 3480, 5261
Reynout Dekimpe	† Kobe Baert nr. 2	2021–2022	Died in the hospital from injuries of a car accident. He went abroad with Waldek, who accompanied him for part of the trip, but the latter developed a heart arrhythmia after participating in the Zihame race with Nora. Kobe tried to take over the wheel from the backseat and took off his seatbelt when an oncoming vehicle came, sending the car into the ditch and him flying out the windshield. The oncoming driver was Chris's accomplice, who was kidnapping Hannah in the ice cream truck at the time. The two were unharmed, and Hannah was also mentally sound because she was asleep at the time. He tried to take her to John but was arrested while John was able to drive away, and Hannah was rescued.	5056–5256
Season 28
Marc Stroobants	Stefaan Le Grand	2021–2022	Ended up in prison for his role in Robrecht's death. Later released and moved to Italy in S28–29.	5076–5254
Maike Boerdam	Anouk Bergsma	2022	Absconded after her visit to Thilly and Harry in the apartment of Bar Madam where the latter learned he didn't kill her in Thailand back in 2008 and Chris lied and manipulated him the whole time	5215–5216
Michiel Donies	Senne De Roo	2022	Alongside his friends arrested and suspended from college after their role in the gaybashing was revealed	5141–5211
Pieter Casteleyn	† Robrecht Callier	2021–2022	Pushed down the stairs of the college by Stefaan after he revealed that Stefaan stalked Karin to everyone and died from injuries in the hospital. He was also together with Senne and their friends responsible for the gaybashing.	5067–5211
Katrien De Becker	† Tania Tibergyn	2018–2022	Died of an overdose of methamphetamine in her drink that originally belonged to Chris	4457–5205
Adrian Sack	Haroun Sacoor	2022	Absconded after he with his company Sacoor Tronics bought over Homebeat from Boowie. Later in S28, the company came up again when they bought Boowie's VR escape room after the fatal incident with Paulien and when Lowie never wanted anything to do with the project again.	5188–5197
Erwin Van De Put	Roland Du Champs	2022	Moved on after selling his land to Chris. He was an illegal animal breeder who sold Pips to Tim, but turned out to be ill. Frank wanted justice, and together with Ilias and Paulien, he wanted to expose his illegal business, which they succeeded in doing.	5147–5180
Belinda Voorspoels	Lexi Waeyaert	2019–2022	Went to work at the police station in Lint so she could work closer to her family (this is a reference that actress Belinda Voorspoels began starring in Familie)	4695–c. 5132
Anette	Otto (donkey that stayed at De Withoeve)	2021–2022	Absconded	5110–?
Daisy Van Praet (also appeared in E2347–2350 in S13 in 2008 as Bea)	Nina Oostvoghels nr. 2	2021	Fled with Yasmine who later returned a few months later to Peter.	4980–5055
Sid Van Oerle (also appeared in E3073–3074 in S17 in 2011 as Thijs)	† Kobe Baert nr. 1	2016–2021, also played a role in podcast audio series Ik, Karin (2020)	Replaced by actor Reynout Dekimpe	4109–5055
Elias Bosmans	Jef Van Hout	2021	Left with Emma to Peru. Later revealed in S29 that he broke up with her and returned to Belgium while she stayed.	4980–5050
Walter Moeremans	† Leo Vertongen	2008–2021	Died of a stroke on his wedding day to Marianne	2330–5041
Peter Van De Velde (also appeared in multiple roles, in the early years appeared as a journalist in E136 in S2 in 1996 and as a doctor in 1998)	† Jacques Pieters	2018, 2019–2021, Secrets (2018)	Shot by Tim and died on the spot after murdering several people, including his wife in 2008, Jasper, Roxanne, Reinhilde and her husband Mark, and Gerda Vandendael, killing Kobe's dog Vondel, attempting to murder others, raping Thilly, committing other crimes, and currently holding Judith, Thilly, and Waldek at gunpoint. Partially reappeared in a new scene in E5041, which revealed he had also kidnapped Rosa on the day he was shot.	4387–4479, 4548–4803, 4838–5000, 5025–5040, 5041 (hand and pistol visible and voice)
Season 27
Danielle Martin	† Gerda Vandendael	2021	Murdered by Jacques in her house where Jacques later held Judith hostage and was shot dead by Tim	5035
Several dogs	† Vondel (Kobe's dog)	2021	Killed by Jacques at the barrel as revenge on Kobe in E5030. Later buried in E5032.	5023–5031
Ilse Janssens	Various roles	2005–2006, 2012, 2021	Appeared in E1895, 1916–1917 in S11 in 2005–2006 as Carinne, the wife of Willy, appeared in E3156–3164 in S17 in 2012 as Ms. Somers and appeared in E4965–5031 in S26 in 2021 as the gynecologist during Christine's pregnancy with the twins Jaan and Finn, who ultimately had to tell her and Adil that Finn had not made it	1895, 1916–1917, 3156–3164, 4965–5031
Philip Burghmans	Muscular man in Bar Madam	2021	Appeared once as muscular man with whom Thilly had meaningless sex in Bar Madam but was sent away by Harry. Thilly was fed up with people interfering in her life now that her family, friends, and acquaintances were shocked when Jacques confessed to Waldek that he, not Jasper, had raped Thilly in ACE a year and a half earlier.	5030
Uncredited actress or extra	Astrid	2021	Appeared once as a date of Joren when he decided to date girls again and went with her to Bar Madam, Joren didn't think she was the perfect partner. When he went to the restroom, Thilly "saved" him by lying, causing her to leave in a rage without confronting Joren. Thilly was there with Stan and he and Joren were okay again.	5020
Niels Vandoorne	Date Joren	2021	Appeared once a date of Joren who arranged to meet him at Bar Madam but due to an unexpected confrontation with Stan, Joren worked on the frustrations of his date, causing him to leave in anger	5010
Nico Verdikt	Date Joren 1	2021	Both appeared once when Joren went dating men and due to a mistake the two ended up at Bar Madam for the date that same evening, which caused the two to leave Joren's place in anger and the two went drinking together elsewhere	5003
Ian Thorne	Date Joren 2	2021	Both appeared once when Joren went dating men and due to a mistake the two ended up at Bar Madam for the date that same evening, which caused the two to leave Joren's place in anger and the two went drinking together elsewhere	5003
Frithjof Van Reeth	Thierry De Vyver	2020, 2021	Absconded after he sold Bar Madam to Harry and the two celebrated this in the cafe and it was a bad sign for the employees because of Harry's role with that fuss about Roxanne and the drugs in his Club Impulse	4769–4771, 4995
Uncredited actress or extra	Date Joren	2021	She once appeared uncredited as a date of Joren's, and they got along well. She accompanied him to Lowie's house to have sex with him on the couch. Just as they were about to start, Hannah caught them, causing them to burst out laughing. Sam was later unhappy about the incident, and Joren and his date ended the date.	4988
Lizzy De Scheemaecker	Eline	2021	Appeared once as Eline, a date of Joren who met him at Bar Madam and got along well until it became clear that it was only 2 weeks ago that Joren broke up with his ex-lover Emma.	4982
Eve Van Avermaet (also appeared in Secrets in 2018 as Lauren De la Faille)	† Roxanne Goethals	2020–2021	Murdered by Jacques who burned her corpse and her car at the same location where he dumped Jasper's corpse.	4840, 4899–4971
Bianca Vanhaverbeke (also appeared in E3262–3274 in S18 in 2012 as Tina, self-help group leader)	Sigrid Eyckermans, from the Social Research Department	2020–2021	Absconded after her and Ine's conversation with Kobe and Paulien in Karin's villa ended badly	4908–4919, 4970
Rocco Lubrano	Jelle Naessens	2019–2021	Absconded after he and Robin came face to face with Britt and Zihame. Zihame learned Jelle a lesson. He was incorrectly listed in the credits of E4919 as Cederic.	4717–4734, 4775, 4919, 4967
Bert Kettermans (also appeared in E4812 in S25 in 2020 as Mr. De Saegher (possibly also Goethals with an other name), credited as Bert Ketterman)	Mr. Geert Goethals	2021	Absconded after he ended his collaboration with Boowie because Lowie kept contacting his sister Roxanne, and Roxanne turned out to be a drug dealer. Roxanne was later murdered by Jacques. He was mentioned earlier during S26 when Roxanne just turned out to have given up alcohol.	4959–4965, 4966 (voice)
Céline Van Ouytsel (Miss Belgium 2020) (also returning BV-guest of the weekly podcast Welkom Thuis (2024–ongoing))	Herself (cameo)	2021	Appeared once as herself at Club Impulse when Dieter and Lexi went undercover there and Dieter wanted a photo with her which she agreed to.	4954
Inge Ringoot	Running trainer	2021	Appeared as the running coach of the girls who run professionally including Britney and Zihame (who made her entrance)	4937–4948
Jeroen De Muynck	Various roles	2020, 2021	Once appeared as an inspector who had to inspect the fuse box in Frank and Simonne's house when they were planning to sell it. The box turned out to no longer meet the current systems and had to be replaced. Joren had to install a new fuse box as part of his ACE project, but he was busy and also had a date with Emma, so Frank went to install the rest of the box. Later, the house burned down due to a short circuit in the box. It is not clear which of the two had messed up the fuse box. Appeared in E4945 also in S26 in 2021 as a drunken man who was being difficult with Lexi, forcing Dieter to intervene. Afterwards, Lexi showed her most vulnerable side and finally told her what was bothering her.	4902, 4945
Maxime Van Dommele	Nurse	2021	Appeared once as a nurse who examined the lump under Bob's armpit and that the results would later be passed on to Judith. Judith then revealed to Bob that he had cancer. Bob then had an appointment at the hospital for his PET scan and met hematologist Nora Amrani (who made her entrance).	4936–4943
Karlijn Sileghem	Chantal Clerckx	2019–2021	Absconded after the conversation with Dieter in De Withoeve about Jasper's last moments before he was murdered. Dieter wanted to reopen the murder investigation on Jasper and found a possible clue: a card from Club Impulse, which Harry owned.	4718–4763, 4797–4800, 4845–4889, 4939
Lutgarde Verbeken	Customer	2021	Appeared once as a customer at Bar Madam, where Angèle tried to sell cookies to her, became her second customer. But the first customer (Leo De Clippeleir) angrily revealed that the cookies were inedible, which Angèle later realized: Eddy had made them wrong. The proceeds from the cookies normally went to Frank and Simonne.	4937
Annelien Vercauteren	Astrid Seynaeve	2021	Appeared once as Astrid Seynaeve who was brought in by Bob to take over his work from Boowie when Bob was ill. Bob and everyone thought it was the flu, but later Bob discovered a lump under his armpit and after examination the terrible news came that he had cancer.	4931
Moora Vander Veken	Olivia Hoefkens	2014–2019, 2020–2021	Moved to Boston for good. Later revealed she became pregnant at the same time that Tamara and Bob married and Lily-Rose was born in E5277.	3521, 3553–4700, 4754–4757, 4917–4926
Dries Van Cauwenbergh (also probably appeared in a flashback in E5759 in S30 in 2024 as young Tim Cremers)	Willem	2020	He once showed up at a party at Tom's house with Robin and Jelle (credited as Cederic in the credits) while Tom and Karin were away, and then went to a party with the two, even though Robin was forbidden to do so. Robin abandoned Britney because of Jelle and Willem.	4919
Lucas Vanden Berghe	Agent	2020	Appeared once to keep people away from Frank and Simonne's house at night, which was on fire and was being extinguished by the fire department. Bob, Sam, and Tim were briefly held back by him.	4914
Sven de Leijer	Firefighter	2020	Appeared in E4914 as a firefighter who, together with his colleagues, extinguished the fire at Frank and Simonne's house. His cameo was confirmed in season 2020 of his talk show Vrede op Aarde where he appeared in a sketch where he saved the green thermos, which had been on the kitchen table for years, from the fire. He also appeared in the actual episode.	4914
Bart Vanackere	Various roles including Rudy Bergmans (2020)	2012, 2020	Appeared in E3091 in S17 in 2012 as Rudi Smits, a freelance journalist who tried to interview Julia about Guy who murdered Fien but was sent away by Peggy. Appeared in E4892–4893 in S26 in 2020 as Rudy Bergmans, a business client originally wanted to collaborate with Boowie and ACE on a project. When Tania and Simonne, along with Adil, had to meet Rudy while Bob and Lowie were at another appointment, Adil couldn't make it due to unforeseen circumstances, so his girlfriend Christine stepped in without permission and managed to convince Rudy. But Bob and Lowie, who were against her, unexpectedly returned from the appointment that was cancelled and Bob was angry that Christine was with Boowie and sent her in the presence of Rudy. This led to Rudy only wanting to continue working with ACE, and when Bob and Lowie discovered this, the two no longer wanted to work with ACE because, according to them, Adil did not keep to the agreements: keeping work and private life separate, since Christine started working in the company and even became co-owner.	3091, 4892–4893
Walter Janssens	Yves Wellens ('Didier Van Broeckhoven')	2020	Arrested for multiple robberies with Isabelle and for injuring Eddy. The two committed robberies at Bar Madam, Taxi Nancy and other shops and almost also at Stevenson and De Withoeve. Their plan was simple: one would seduce the cashier while the other would steal the cash from the register. He was also a one-night stand of Angèle during the robbery at Bar Madam, which almost caused her relationship with Eddy to fall apart and almost got her fired from the café. When Angèle, Eddy, Frank, Nancy and Dieter discovered Yves and Isabelle's plans, Eddy wanted to confront Yves but Yves knocked him down and fled with Isabelle but were arrested by Tim and Lexi after a chase, while Yves was injured by Frank as revenge. Eddy temporarily lost the ability to smell for months due to the injuries, but Eddy attributed it to Harry and thanked him at his funeral in S28. His real name was revealed to Frank by Tim in E4894, after he was fined for the injuries he inflicted on Yves. He is still called Didier after the events e.g. by Sam in S28 when Angèle was charmed again by a kind man Dirk and she did not want that scenario to happen again.	4876–4891
Heidi De Grauwe	Isabelle	2020	Arrested for multiple robberies with Yves ('Didier'). The two committed robberies at Bar Madam, Taxi Nancy and other shops and almost also at Stevenson and De Withoeve. Their plan was simple: one would seduce the cashier while the other would steal the cash from the register. When Angèle, Eddy, Frank, Nancy and Dieter discovered Yves and Isabelle's plans, Eddy wanted to confront Yves but Yves knocked him down and fled with Isabelle but were arrested by Tim and Lexi after a chase, while Yves was injured by Frank as revenge.	4879–4891
Uncredited actor or extra	Appraiser	2020	Appeared once uncredited as an appraiser who had to value Steven's villa so that Karin could buy it. Kobe and Rosa could thus pay their fine.	4889
Uncredited actor or extra	Didier Van Broeckhoven	2020	He appeared once when Tim and Lexi were meeting him at the entrance of the company where he worked for his role as a witness in the Taxi Nancy robbery. It turned out that Didier didn't have the same physical features Nancy had described, leading Tim and Lexi to discover that the witness had used a stolen name. Viewers then knew that the fake Didier was involved in the robbery plot along with Isabelle.	4887
Greet Rouffaer	† Reinhilde Deploige	2019–2020	Left for Spain and later murdered there by Jacques (E5020). Her husband Mark Deploige, whom she had left but was still married to, was also murdered by Jacques in Spain in the beginning of S26 and his funeral appeared on screen. Jacques killed him by hitting him with a car while he was cycling and committed a hit-and-run	4660–4679, 4709, 4782–4875
Monika Van Lierde	Ann De Decker	1995–1996, 1996–1997, 1997–1998, 2001–2006, 2006–2020	Moved abroad (Cape Verde) after she killed Xander, Tania's rape by Walter was revealed and the fact that Marianne had known about the incident for years. Marianne later tried to convince her to return for her wedding to Leo, but Ann refused and not long after, she sold the mansion, ending the doctor's practice. Judith has since worked in the hospital, Tim and Sam became the owners of the mansion and Marianne moved to Karin's villa.	1–58, 95–255, 292–394, 1060–1920, 2036–4874, Special: Afscheid van Florke (2004)
Pieter Jan De Paepe	† Xander Tibergyn	2020	Killed in self-defense by Ann who fatally struck him on the head with a shovel at the Dreef after he tried to strangle his mother Tania in a rage. Xander was the second and last victim police attended at the crime scene in a flashforward at the end of S25 (E4834–4835). Due to COVID-19 the complete season could not be recorded so the season ended on 24 April 2020 instead of 11 June. As filming was no longer possible the producers had to be inventive with the material they had, resulting in a choppy storyline in last episodes. (Note: Attributed to multiple references:)	4829–4872
Tine Buelens	Child psychologist	2020	Appeared once to help Robin mentally after he was kidnapped by Xander	4871
Tom Janssen (possibly Tom Jansen)	Chairman of the court	2020	Appeared once at the testimony of Tom, Peter, Dries and Reinhilde to remove Karin as a lawyer	4860
Kristof Verhassel (also appeared in E2003–2056 in S11–12 in 2006 as Wim Daniels)	† Jasper Berens	2019–2020	Murdered by Jacques who fatally struck him on the head with a wrench in the ACE yard after Jasper told him he will find out who really had raped Thilly and Jacques saw that as a threat. Jasper was the first victim police attended at the crime scene in a flashforward at the end of S25 (E4829). Due to COVID-19 the complete season could not be recorded so the season ended on 24 April 2020 instead of 11 June. As filming was no longer possible the producers had to be inventive with the material they had, resulting in a choppy storyline in last episodes. (Note: Attributed to multiple references:)	4652–4762, 4836–4858
Seppe Cosyns (also appeared in E3209 in S18 in 2012 as a young drug user)	Bas	2020	Absconded after his one-time courtship with Judith. However, when Judith revealed that this was a one-time affair, he broke off contact with her and Emma. Bas was Emma's internship mentor, and when she learned about the kiss, she was briefly angry with Judith.	4818–4836
Season 26
Marilou Mermans	Els Vervloet	2009–2010, 2019–2020	Absconded	2690–2725, 4703 (voice), 4710–4773, 4820–4823
Ellis Meeusen	Zana	2020	Absconded. She is working in the Belgian army with Stan	4813–4821
Aaron De Veene	Jesse	2019–2020	Absconded after the fight with Stan	4705–4716, 4803–4805
Britt Hellinx	Cynthia Renders	2020	Absconded after Adil broke up with her	4781–4796
Dirk Bosschaert	Ivo	2020	Absconded after Nancy had an appointment with him at De Withoeve to apply for a job at Taxi Ivo, he didn't need any new drivers, which caused the conversation to go wrong. Nancy started her own taxi company later: Taxi Nancy	4786
Francesca Vanthielen	Isolde Teerlynck	2019–2020	Absconded after her daughter Charlotte and Jelle briefly kidnapped Vic	4650–4662, 4772–4780
Sterre Hannes	Charlotte Dupont	2019–2020	Absconded after she and Jelle briefly kidnapped Vic	4717–4734, 4766–4775
Eva Vanduren	† Frederieke Verstraeten	2019–2020	Died in bad fall during skirmish with Jasper who mistook her for Thilly	4736–4752
Maya Albert	Aïsha Fawzi	2003–2008, 2019	Moved to Morocco with Youssef in S13, where years later Mo, Bianca and Robin also joined them. Later, Jenny Fawzi, another daughter of her father Mo, was born. Briefly returned in S25 as a guest character when she gave custody of Robin to Tom after Mo and later Bianca both died in a car accident and Aïsha remained in Morocco with Youssef and Jenny Fawzi. She and Youssef were mentioned again in S30 when Robin temporarily stayed with them after the tensions caused by Gregory and his gang and Eve. Robin then underwent a change of actor.	1442–2395, 4713–4719
Els Béatse	Kristel Janssens	2019	Absconded after her discussion with Dries	4681–4709
Jelle Florizoone	Daan De Loore	2019	Absconded	4557–4620, 4670, 4699–4704
Season 25
Thomas De Smet	Boris Busschots	2019	Absconded	4617–4664
Günter Samson	† Bill De Witte	2018–2019	Hit by a train while trying to save his son Joren from the tracks and later died from his injuries in the hospital	4494–4598, 4627–4658
Jannes Coessens	Stan Van Damme nr. 1	2012–2019	Replaced by actor Lennart Lemmens	3266–4461, 4493–4594
Muriel Bats	Mayra Magiels	2011–2018, 2019	Under Waldek's orders, she left for Cape Verde with her father David after the truth about Zoë and Magaly's baby swap that she committed came to light. Returned briefly when her adopted daughter Sandrine was in the hospital with a gunshot wound to her head and left again when Sandrine died. It then turned out that she had founded a shelter for children in Cape Verde, partly out of guilt for her past actions.	2977–4452, 4545–4553
Michiel De Meyer	Arne Guns	2016–2019	Started a new life in Switzerland	3947–4175, 4214–4303, 4349–4501, 4549
Sally-Jane Van Horenbeeck	Peggy Verbeeck	1995–1997, 1998–1999, 2000, 2002, 2006, 2008–2016, 2018	Moved to Portugal to open a hotel with her youth love Bennie. Last seen at Rosa and Steven's wedding party at De Withoeve.	1–265, 434–603, 630–705, 825–910, 1295, 2035–2044, 2413–4030, 4483–4484
Mark Tijsmans	Benjamin 'Bennie' De Taeye	1995–1998, 1999, 2016, 2018	Moved to Portugal to open a hotel with his youth love Peggy. Last seen at Rosa and Steven's wedding party at De Withoeve.	1–73, 108–135, 200–315, 480–482, 641–655, 4009–4030, 4484
Season 24
Myriam Bronzwaar	Julia Van Capelle	2007–2014, 2014–2016, 2017, 2018	Lives in a psychiatric clinic after multiple murders and murder attempts	2194–3573, 3672–4085, 4148–4257, 4410–4444
Several children including Apollonia Sterckx (2009–2018)	Britney 'Britt' Van Notegem nr. 1	2006–2018	Played by regular actress Apollonia Sterckx	2025–4442 (appeared sporadically)
Mark Willems	† Luc Bomans	1996–2018	Died in his sleep	54 (voice), 65–4430, Special: Afscheid van Florke (2004)
Aïssatou Diop	Charité Doumbia	2015–2017, 2018	Moved with her beloved Renzo and the children Joseph and Dylan to Renzo's ex-wife and Dylan's mother Wendy in Southern France	3840–4255, 4296 (voice), 4346–4415
Frank Van Erum	Renzo Fierens	2004–2006, 2014–2018	Moved to Southern France as his son lives there	1658–2000, 3639–4415
Mostafa Benkerroum	Omar Jamal	2017, 2018	Absconded after the business dinner with Karin in a restaurant	4231, 4238, 4332, 4363, 4372
Willy Herremans	Sinterklaas (cameo)	2017	Appeared once uncredited as Sinterklaas who, together with Zwarte Piet, delivered presents to De Withoeve and came across a sleeping Britney who originally wanted to catch Sinterklaas as she tried every year	4313
Wout van Aert	Himself (cameo)	2017	Appeared once at Dieter's bachelor party. This is a reference that Wout and Dieter have almost the same surname, but that Van starts with a capital letter in Dieter's name, but not in Wout's.	4299
Eric Kerremans (also appeared in E5266–5270 in S28 in 2022 as Mr. Jan Cools)	Antonio	2017	Absconded after he turned out to be both Rosa's and Angèle's lover and the two taught him a lesson	4255–4268
Season 23
Bill Barberis	Toon Vrancken	2013–2017	Suddenly left because he was afraid of entering into a relationship with Kaat and hurting her. Last seen talking to Sam with Hannah present at the playground where he revealed that his sudden departure was the best option and was then planning to travel abroad as a tour guide.	3444–4161, 4162 (voice), 4235
Joy Anna Thielemans	Jana Blomaert	2012–2017	Moved to Boston for the wedding of her father, but stayed over there after she was expelled at university as she made private medical information public	3123–4145
Katrien Vandendries (also appeared in E20–73, 110–185, 266–365 in S1–3 in 1996–1998 as Carolien Jacobs)	Lena Blondeel	2014–2016, 2017	After Jens' death she left for New York for work. Last seen on Olivia's twentieth birthday. It was later mentioned in S26 that she lives in Boston when Olivia moved there permanently.	3564–3569, 3621–3900, 4130
Luk De Koninck (actor) (also appeared in E74–84 in S1 in 1996 as Marc Van den Bakker)	William "Henri" Degreef	2015–2016	Arrested and in prison after murdered Hélène, a murder attempt on Marianne and Tom, broke of contact with Rosa and Marianne was able to recover her money	3709–4034, 4070–4110
Chris Boni	† Yvette Backx	2001–2005, 2006–2016	Died in her sleep due to heart issues	1066–1830, 2092–4063, Special: Afscheid van Florke (2004)
Lieven Van Gils	Himself	2016	Appeared once when Ruben came to present his book on the talk show Van Gils & gasten	4053
Janine Bischops	† Jenny Verbeeck	1995–2016	Moved temporally to Morocco to visit her daughter Bianca but died after a stroke	1–1409, 1435–1780, 1836–4037, Special: Afscheid van Florke (2004)
Season 22
Camilia Blereau (also appeared in E830 in S5 in 2000 as the mayor and in Special: Afscheid van Florke (2004) as Madeleine Rousseau)	† Hélène Symons	2014–2016	Murdered by William and later found in the latter apartment by Tim and Dieter	3566–3570, 3598–3834, 3980–3919, 3950–4025
Merel De Vilder Robier	† Bianca Bomans	1995–1999, 2000, 2003, 2006, 2009–2011, 2015, 2016	Moved to Morocco with her husband Mo and son Robin after Tom won custody and co-parenting of Robin in a court case but Bianca and Mo didn't want him. Came back twice temporarily after that, including for Frank and Simonne's relationship anniversary and last seen when Peggy moved to Portugal with Bennie. Later in 2017, she had another child, Jenny Fawzi, this time with Mo. Years later, news broke that she, Mo and Robin were in a car accident, with Mo dying instantly and Bianca a week later. (E4713 in S25 in 2019)	1–57, 77 (voice), 80 (voice), 125–725, 828–838, 1405, 2034–2040, 2551–2990, 3810–3815, 4008–4025
Jelle Cleymans	† Jens De Belder	2008–2015	Hit by a car driven by Paulien Snackaert and died in the hospital some time later	2357–3895
Peter Rouffaer (also appeared in E456–460 in S3 in 1998 as attorney general at the trial of Frank, Jenny and Bianca)	† Geert Smeekens	2006–2015	Accidentally fatally stabbed with a letter opener by Hélène, with Marianne and William as witnesses. It later turns out to have been intentional. Geert intervened between a fight between Hélène and Marianne when the latter had evidence that Hélène cheated on Geert with a certain Henri with Hélène tried to stab Marianne but Geert intervened. Geert was secretly married to Hélène and Henri later turned out to be William who, together with Hélène, formed a plan to murder Geert and Marianne for their inheritances. He died in E5810–5811, but later appeared in Marianne's nightmares when she herself doubted whether she had killed Geert and in flashbacks revealing how Hélène stabbed him.	1918–3811, 3816 (nightmare), 3835 (flashback), 3893 (flashback)
Season 21
Jef Hoogmartens	Franky Bomans nr. 4	2015	Left to USA. Some time later the actor was replaced by actress Leen Dendievel as the character Franky returned as the transsexual Kaat	3807–3810
Tom Waes	Himself (cameo)	2015	Appeared once in the Frens with Alex (a Thuis fan)	3802
Nadia Abdelouafi	Karima (Bakkel) nr. 1	2015	Absconded and later replaced by actress Tania Cnaepkens	3688–3709, 3740–3770
Mariette Van Arkkels (also appeared in E672–673 in S5 in 1999 as wife of customer)	sister Scholastika/ Josepha De Wispelaere	2015	Absconded after the confrontation with Sam and Tim in their search for Sam's biological mother and she finally gave them a lead.	3740–3745
Roger Baum	Jan Hoefkens	2014, 2015	Absconded after the divorce from Lena because the marriage could no longer be saved and the two had affairs with others, including Lena with Jens	3637, 3690, 3694
Season 20
Tanya Zabarylo	investigating judge Lobke Rubbens	2014	Absconded after she decided that Mayra and Waldek should appear in court for Kurt's death, she continued to believe that Mayra had manipulated Waldek and that they were murderers, despite numerous objections from them and their lawyers, Peter and Krista De Cooman.	3581–3584
Bert Verbeke	Bram Schepers	2009–2014	Moved to Southern France after his split with Jana	2642–3245, 3310–3578
Season 19
Wout Verstappen	Dixie	2013	Absconded after Franky sent him away from the Frens	3297–3299
Alice Toen	† Madeleine Vercauteren	2010–2012	Died due to overdose of insuline	2852–3050, 3176–3200, 3236–3260
Erik Goris	Guy De Herdt	2011–2012	In prison after holding several people (Ann, Mayra, Marianne, Sandrine, Femke and Tim) hostage in Marianne's mansion	3001–3103, 3144–3240
Mattias Van de Vijver	Kazàn 'Kasper' Adayef (Kasper Kosinski)	2005–2008, 2012	Died after injuries after he fell from a step	1910–2445, 3175–3229
Hugues Hausman (also appeared in E246–247 in S2 in 1997 as gendarme Didier Mercier and in E2268, 2320–2346 in S13 in 2007–2008 as Steurs)	Roy	2012	Absconded. He spoke French like his actor.	3189–3218
Season 18
Harry Deswarte	Brewer	2012	Absconded after the founding of Slurfke	3188, 3195
Rudi Giron & Hans Croon	Drunken friends	2012	Appeared once as drunk friends of Franky and Bram during Franky's bachelor party. (Rudi Giron was also listed in the credits in E5769–5777 in S30 in 2025 as the doctor, but this appears to be an error in the credits. Steven Verboven played the doctor in E5762–5777)	3195
Annemarie Picard (also appeared in E48–86 in S1 in 1996 as Agnes Raemaeckers-Vervust and in E1176–1180 in S7 in 2002 as Meester Rochussen)	Martha	2011–2012	Absconded after she was no longer welcome at Nancy and Eddy's	3067–3068, 3117–3135, 3172–3174
Lilian Keersmaekers	Lore Roels	2011–2012	Absconded after Guy was acquitted of Fien's murder because lawyer Tom was able to convince the jury that Julia had misinterpreted Guy's words and that Fien had died of a hereditary heart disease.	3046–3048, 3091, 3144–3145
Maarten Claeyssens	Rafaël Campo	2011–2012	Taken into a psychiatric institution after having stabbed Peter and poissonned Femke	2945–2958, 2986–3139
Lotte Lesage	† Fien Roels	2011	Strangled/murdered by Guy after he delusionally mistook her for her ex-wife Mayra. He buried her body but it was discovered later and Guy confessed to Julia that he had murdered Fien. A trial was started in which lawyer Tom was able to convince the jury that Julia had misinterpreted Guy's words and that Fien had died of a hereditary heart disease. Guy later went to prison for the hostage-taking at Marianne's mansion.	2926–3040
Eric Silverans (also appeared in E5439 in S28 in 2023 as a winegrower who taught Karin)	Private detective Sven Bauwens	2011	Absconded after he was ordered by Marianne to find out the contents of Peggy's text message	3025–3028
Jos Dom	† Herman Schepers	2009–2010, 2011	Died of a cerebral hemorrhage due to a brain tumor when he went fishing for the last time with his son Bram and at a beautiful moment he fell asleep. Bram later scattered Herman's ashes in the same pond. He later appeared in E3004 in Bram's imagination. This happened while Bram was standing by the pond, asking his father for help.	2653–2800, 3004 (imagination)
Season 17
Braam Verreth	Franky Bomans nr. 3	2009–2011	Replaced by actor Jef Hoogmartens	2611–3000
Noureddine Farihi	† Mohammed "Mo" Fawzi	1999–2011	Moved with his wife Bianca and her son Robin to Morocco. Many years later, news broke that both were in a car accident, with Mo dying instantly and Bianca a week later. (E4707)	665–746, 778–805, 892–893, 1030–1059, 1171–1214, 1250–2990, Special: Afscheid van Florke (2004)
Several children	Robin Bomans nr. 1	2010–2011	Moved with Bianca and Mo to Morocco. He returned years later and was played by actor Frits De Ruyter	2806–2990 (appeared sporadically)
Steven Vleminckx (also appeared in E5700 in S30 in 2024 as the principal of the school where Thérèse attended classes)	Inspector Stassens	2007, 2008–2009, 2009, 2011	Absconded after Peter was arrested on suspicion of fraud	2229–2269, 2433, 2461–2536?, 2628, 2969
Clara Cleymans	Nina Oostvoghels nr. 1	2010–2011	After she found out her lover Peter still has feelings for Femke she absconds and takes all of his money with her. Later returned in E4980 being played by actress Daisy Van Praet and revealed she became pregnant and got a daughter Yasmine from Peter before she absconds.	2756–2965
Steph Goossens	† Cois Pelckmans (also called as François "Çois" Pelckmans)	1997–2010	He had to urgently visit his mother in Spain and stayed there for the sake of his former sweetheart, Angèle. In May 2011, Cois filed for divorce from Julia. Years later, however, Angèle returned alone to Belgium (the Ardennes). She told in the hospital that he had likely met a new love in Spain. Later, in E4191 in S22 in 2017, it was revealed that he had died in Spain. His body was found in his own car, which had sunk in a river. Later, in E4245 in S23 in 2017, Julia said she had killed Cois herself because he had hurt her. In E4250 also in S23 in 2017, it became clear that Julia had indeed killed Cois: his name was in her book of people she wanted to deal with. Julia then started a murder spree on all her ex-partners.	319–322, 381, 410–412, 498–584, 737–774, 850–914, 952–983, 1160, 1190–1211, 1242–2895, Special: Afscheid van Florke (2004)
Ann Esch	Kris Moreels	2008–2010	Left for another job	2448–2870
Season 16
Jos Van Geel (also appeared in E30–53 in S1 in 1996 as Dedonder, the union representative and in E1307–1348, 1433–1434 in S8 in 2002–2003 as Francis)	Pierre Snackaert	2008–2009	Left after the breakup with Julia. Strangely enough, Pierre did not return for his daughter Paulien's funeral in S28.	2472–2474, 2503–2532, 2606–2622, 2686–2687
Season 15
Wim Danckaert (also appeared in E579–580 in S4 in 1999 as Jos and in E5735–5766 in S30 in 2024 as Lieven Cremers)	Sylvain Geens	2004–2005, 2008–2009	Absconded after he finally supported Eric in the trial surrounding Mike's murder and Eric was acquitted (due to provocation), which brought the murder investigation to a close. Came back briefly later when Mo and Waldek were fighting over the truth about Kris's hit-and-run and the case was filed.	1631–1640, 1706–1745, 2428–2565, 2597–2598
Kurt Defrancq	Eric Bastiaens	2002–2009	Left on a world trip with his wife Martine to make a fresh start after several setbacks, including Sam and Dorien's car accident, the disappearance and murder of Sofie, and himself, who murdered Sofie's killer, Mike, which led to fears of a long prison sentence, but was acquitted (due to provocation). The two left shortly after Sam and Dorien left.	1275–2590
Christel Domen	Martine Lefever	2002–2009	Left on a world trip with her husband Eric to make a fresh start after several setbacks, including Sam and Dorien's car accident, the disappearance and murder of Sofie, and Eric, who murdered Sofie's killer, Mike, which led to fears of a long prison sentence, but was acquitted (due to provocation). The two left shortly after Sam and Dorien left.	1281–2590
Ronny Daelman	Sam Bastiaens	2002–2009	Left with his wife Dorien to Lanzarote so that Dorien could continue her studies there and give the marriage between him and her a second chance	1281–2589
Tineke Caels	Dorien De Backer	2006–2009	Left with her husband Sam to Lanzarote so that she can continue her studies there and give the marriage between her and him a second chance	2053–2589
Peter Bastiaensen	† Michel 'Mike' Van Notegem	2008	Stabbed to death by Eric with a cake knife after he raped Sofie, murdered her (by strangulation) and dumped her body in a cave in the Ardennes (Hastière). Mike became a suspect but was released due to insufficient evidence and came to the coffee table at Sofie's funeral and destroyed the atmosphere there and when he laughed at Eric in front of him he couldn't contain his anger. Mike also worked illegally, had defrauded Leo of 100,000 euros and started a relationship with the younger Femke even when he turned out to be her biological father and she did not know it. He also almost killed Nancy to keep the secret of the fact that he was Femke's father and blamed his brother Eddy. Eric was put on trial for the murder but was acquitted (due to provocation). Mike was mentioned years later in E5036 in S26 in 2021 by Eddy. Eddy also mentioned that Mike's real name is 'Michel'.	2398–2501
Carla Hoogewijs	Various roles	1996, 2006, 2008	Appeared in E52–53 in S1 in 1996 as John's wife who has 2 children him and was looking for him because he hasn't been heard from for several weeks while John had a relationship with Ann who kicked him out after she learned the truth. Appeared in E1941–1958, 1988–1989 in S11 in 2006 as Lydia Coens and appeared in E2457, 2471, 2488 in S14 in 2008 as the gynecologist.	52–53, 1940–1958, 1988–1989, 2457, 2471, 2488
Daisy Thys	Daisy Vandenkerckhove	2006–2008	Absconded after the fitness centre Fit & Fun was sold	2044–2379, 2415–2483
Gert Lahousse (also appeared in E10–30, 163–292, 325–327, 431 in S1–3 in 1996–1997, 1998 as Neil Feyaerts)	Rudi De Moor	2008	Absconded after Eric apologized that he suspected him for Sofie's disappearance and that Peter injured him and wanted the complaint that Rudi filed to be withdrawn which he eventually did. Rudi lost his wife (Barbara Bracke) and their two children because of his past with Sofie and the other girls after Eric and Peter revealed the truth in anger during the earlier confrontation.	2335–2344, 2464–2469
Season 14
Lien Van de Kelder	† Sofie Bastiaens	2002–2008	After she suddenly disappeared her body was found in a cave in the Ardennes. She was strangled by Mike	1281–2104, 2276–2415
Ali Wauters	Youssef Bakali	2007–2008	Moved to Morocco with his girlfriend Aisha	2137–2395
Bart Schollaert	Johnny	2008	Absconded after Kasper slept in the recycling center after argued with Rosa and Waldek, who found him there, Kasper stopped working there where Johnny also worked.	2371–2386
Raymond Bossaerts	Viktor Corthout	2006–2008	Absconded after Jenny throw him out	2089–2352
Daisy Van Praet (also appeared in E4980–5055 in S26–27 in 2021 as Nina Oostvoghels nr. 2)	Bea	2008	Absconded after she was talking to Aïsha and left when Mo arrived to talk to Aïsha about buying Sanitechniek	2347–2350
Hugues Hausman (also appeared in E246–247 in S2 in 1997 as gendarme Didier Mercier and in E3189–3218 in S17–18 in 2012 as Roy)	Steurs	2007–2008	Absconded after his confrontation with Luc about the debts with Frank as a witness. He spoke French like his actor.	2268, 2320–2346
Jan Van Hecke	Mario Maes	2008	Absconded after he offered a price to buy Marie Design from Marie, but was too weak to help her and Luc resolve the financial problems	2343
Karolien De Beck	† Sandrine Verbeelen	2006–2008	Died due to brain haemorrhage	2049–2330
Bengo	Bengo (dog of the Bastiaens family)	2002–2007	Absconded	1326–S13? (appeared sporadically)
Marijke Hofkens	† Leontien Vercammen	1996–2007, 2013 (voice)	Fled with her son Lowie to Mexico. Some years later it is revealed she died in a car accident and insinuated the crash was a setup by her ex-husband Luc so his son Lowie would return to him.	94–146, 190–335, 366–599, 633, 710–1626, 1755–2306, 3393–3395 (voice), Special: Afscheid van Florke (2004)
Several children	Lowie Bomans nr. 1	2003–2007	Had been taken by Leontien to Mexico. He returned years later and was played by regular actor Mathias Vergels.	1435–2306 (appeared sporadically), Special: Afscheid van Florke (2004)
Peter Van Asbroeck (Elm Vandervorst played young Werner in flashback in E452 in S3 in 1998)	Werner Van Sevenant	1997–2007	Moved to South Africa with Eva, his daughter Julie and Eva's son Nand, where Eva still has family. Upon his departure it was revealed that Eva was pregnant by Werner and they were expecting another child.	286–2295
Nathalie Wijnants	Eva Verbist	1997–2007	Moved to South Africa with her son Nand, Werner and his daughter Julie, where Eva still has family. Upon her departure it was revealed that she was pregnant by Werner and they were expecting another child.	337–1045, 1186–1825, 1950–2295
Jakob Beks	Jacques Van Ginderen	2005–2006, 2007	Fled away with Betty after a scam in a real-estate project. Last seen in S13 as a guest character when he sold Marie Design to Luc and Marie.	1870–2024, 2233–2234
Season 13
Kristine Arras	† Mathilde (Reimers)	2003–2007	Killed by her son Maarten	1399–2220
Erik Burke	Paul Dewals	1996–1997, 1997, 1998, 2003–2004, 2007	Absconded after he had a conversation with Luc and Leontien as a psychiatrist	140–222, 312–320, 382–400, 426–460, 1508–1535, 2117–2140
Gerd De Ley	Various roles	1996, 2003, 2006	Appeared in E17–18 in S1 in 1996 as lawyer Weckx, appeared in E1414 in S8 in 2003 as the president of the court and in E2099 in S12 in 2006 as pastor during Britt's baptism	17–18, 1414, 2099
Kristof Verhassel (also appeared in E4652–4762, 4836–4858 in S24–26 in 2019–2020 as Jasper Berens)	Wim Daniels	2006	Absconded after he broke up with Femke	2003–2065
Rikkert Van Dijck (also appeared in E17–18 in S1 in 1996 as father Weyns)	† Robert Reimers	2003–2006	Fatally poisoned by Mathilde after he realized that she had been poisoning Eva for months so that her grandson Nand would stay in Belgium	1400–1408, 1435–1459, 1495–1496, 1524–1554, 1599–1653, 1691–1725, 1771–1779, 1959–1967, 2051–2060
Season 12
Karel Deruwe	Walter Frans	2004–2006	Left after officially breaking up with Marianne because of his past	1576–2025
Nora Tilley	Betty (Van Ginderen)	2005–2006	Fled away with Jacques after a scam in a real-estate project	1870–2024
Hugo Sigal and Nicole Josy (Nicole and Hugo)	Themselves	2006	Both appeared once to sing for the benefit which became a success and Eva received 6000 euros	1999–2000
Liesbeth Adriaenssens (also appeared in E974–1000 in S6 in 2001 as Lotte Van Baelen)	Maaike Mertens	2005–2006	Left after she and Eric ended their romance	1892–2000
Nand Buyl (also appeared in the Special: Afscheid van Florke (2004) as a café owner)	Arthur 'Tuur' Verbeeck	2005–2006	Moved in with Jetteke in the house of her son Willy	1860–1940
Paula Sémer	Jetteke	2005–2006	Moved in with Tuur in the house of her son Willy	1894–1940
Luc Vandeput	The mayor	2003, 2004, 2006	Absconded after the opening of the service flat. Meanwhile, replaced by another mayor.	1435–1436, 1600, 1940
Veerle Eyckermans (also appeared in E5616–5617 in S29 in 2024 as Greet Van de Vyver)	Magda Clerckx	2004–2005	Absconded after the denouement of the rape case and when the perpetrator Robert Swerts was transferred to prison	1656–1666, 1706–1759, 1785–1876
Eddy Vereycken (also appeared in E224–226 in S2 in 1997 as the lawyer of the family Vercammen during the trial against Frank)	Ward Wildiers	2001, 2002, 2005	Absconded after the denouement of the rape case and when the perpetrator Robert Swerts was transferred to prison	1047–1061, 1106–1127, 1176–1180, 1748–1876
Hans De Munter (also appeared in E213 in S2 in 1997 as the neurosurgeon who announced that Walter will die)	Robert Swerts (formerly called Jan Swerts)	1998, 2002, 2004–2005	In prison for multiple rapings and being responsible for Veronique's death by hiring an assassin (Abdel) and also for the murder of Abdel	433–461, 1163–1180, 1595–1876
Oswald Versyp	Constant "Stany Love" De Schrijver	2004–2005	Absconded abroad after he tricked someone for a huge amount of money	1547–1841, Special: Afscheid van Florke (2004)
Ernst Löw	Arno Dandrea	2004–2005	Left after he and Martine ended their romance	1651–1828
Season 11
Govert Deploige	Michael Bastiaens	2002–2004, 2007	Left to work for Médecins Sans Frontières	1327–1825
Viv Van Dingenen (Nele Vandenpoel played young Veronique in flashback in E448, 452 in S3 in 1998)	† Veronique Van Sevenant	1996–2005	Got lost in the dessert. Later on it is insinuated Robert Swerts hired an assassin (Abdel) to kill her as she knew Robert was a raper	136–616, 650–706, 832–1825, Special: Afscheid van Florke (2004)
Nolle Versyp	André "Dré" Van Goethem	1997–2005	Moved to Southern France with Jenny, but she couldn't get used to life there and returned to Belgium while he stayed and ended the relationship permanently. It's unclear whether Dré is still alive or not, as actor Nolle Versyp died on 5 October 2006. He was mentioned in S30 in March 2025 when Marie returned and her son Andreas made his appearance, who was named after Dré, but it wasn't revealed whether he was deceased or not.	299–420, 461–1780, Special: Afscheid van Florke (2004)
Hugo Danckaert	Fons Vertommen	1995, 1996, 1998, 1999, 2001, 2001–2002, 2003, 2004	Absconded after Constant managed to reach an agreement with him: the insurance company would pay the damages, since Waldek was within his rights. Waldek was employed by Sanitechniek and had a car accident during working hours. The car is totaled, so Frank calls on the insurance company, but Waldek was actually on sick leave and driving around in a cast. Vertommen confronted Frank about his concealment of this information and accused him of attempted fraud, prompted Constant to intervene.	3–4, 133, 367–388, 488–497, 548–549, 609–611, 1076–1083, 1130–1202, 1422–1428, 1641–1647
Dirk Tuypens	† Jan Reimers	2003–2004	Killed by Werner	1377–1631
Season 10
Pascale Bal	Isabelle Vinck	2000–2002, 2003–2004	In jail after she tried to murder several people. She tried to throw Lowie out of her apartment but was convinced by Femke not to. After Lowie was brought to safety, she attempted suicide but was stopped and arrested.	781–1305, 1375–1390, 1487–1534, 1560, 1589–1626
Camilia Blereau (also appeared in E830 in S5 in 2000 as the mayor and in E3566–3570, 3598–3834, 3980–3919, 3950–4025 in S19–21 in 2014–2016 as Hélène Symons)	Madeleine Rousseau	2004	Returned to her home in Charleroi after Florke's funeral	Special: Afscheid van Florke (2004)
Nand Buyl (also appeared in E1860–1940 in S11 in 2005–2006 as Arthur 'Tuur' Verbeeck)	Café owner	2004	Both appeared once as café owners where Frank and Luc drank and where Frank was shocked when he saw the ghosts of Rogerke and Fernand at a table, but without Florke. The owners also knew Florke.	Special: Afscheid van Florke (2004)
Chris Lomme (also appeared E4381–4383, 4418–4420 in S23 in 2018 as Mariette)	Café owner	2004	Both appeared once as café owners where Frank and Luc drank and where Frank was shocked when he saw the ghosts of Rogerke and Fernand at a table, but without Florke. The owners also knew Florke.	Special: Afscheid van Florke (2004)
Danny Verbiest (Samson actor)	Samson (puppeteer and voice)	2004	Both appeared once while Frank and Luc were walking at night and the two confirmed their only condolences for Florke's passing, the two also turned out to knew her. Frank and Luc were confused because Samson was speaking.	Special: Afscheid van Florke (2004)
Gert Verhulst (also appeared later in the mid-2010s together with James Cooke (Belgian) as a hospital patient), James Cooke also appeared international in a speaking guest role in E9232 of the Australian soap opera Neighbours)	Gert	2004	Both appeared once while Frank and Luc were walking at night and the two confirmed their only condolences for Florke's passing, the two also turned out to knew her. Frank and Luc were confused because Samson was speaking.	Special: Afscheid van Florke (2004)
Frank Aendenboom	Pastor	2004	Appeared once as pastor while Frank and Luc walked through an alley (possibly filmed in Bruges) and the pastor spoke a message to the two.	Special: Afscheid van Florke (2004)
Urbanus	Bar hanger	2004	Appeared once as bar hanger in a café where Frank and Luc were drinking, he claimed to be an acquaintance of Florke's. He was also sending a message to the two.	Special: Afscheid van Florke (2004)
Antje De Boeck	Tram driver	2004	Appeared once as a tram driver who was transporting Frank and Luc through the city when Frank walked away from the coffee table at Florke's funeral. Her appearance was actually a message to Frank and Luc.	Special: Afscheid van Florke (2004)
Ann Petersen	† Florentine 'Florke' Rousseau(-Bomans)	1996–2004	Died of cardiac arrest while visiting her sister Madeleine in Charleroi in E1586. She was last seen alive in E1562, in E1571 it was revealed that she was staying with her sister and in E1586, her death was revealed to the Bomans family. She played a central role in the special: Afscheid van Florke (2004) and appeared through archive footage and her funeral also happened on screen. In E3740 in S20 in 2015, she appeared with Rogerke, Frank and Simonne on TV when Sam and Tim were in a nursing home through archive footage from E1045 which broke the fourth wall and foreshadowed that Simonne was Sam's biological mother. In E4906 in S26 in 2020, she appeared in a flashback with Rogerke baby Kaat (then Franky) through archive footage when Frank was planning to sell his house and was nostalgically reminiscing about the memories there.	32–1061, 1150–1562, Special: Afscheid van Florke (2004, archive footage)
Wim Peters (actor)	Joeri Verbist	1997–2003	Left to Madrid	337–1450
Season 9
Herbert Flack	Jean-Pierre De Ruyter	1997–2003	Fled away to Portugal with stolen money	461–1435
Jos Van Geel (also appeared in E30–53 in S1 in 1996 as Dedonder, the union representative and in E2472–2474, 2503–2532, 2606–2622, 2686–2687 in S14–15 in 2008–2009 as Pierre Snackaert)	Francis	2002–2003	Absconded	1307–1348, 1433–1434
Cecile Rigolle	Blanche Hofkens	1996, 1998, 2000, 2003	Absconded after she preferred to have an office hour with Dré instead of Michael	150–168, 380–381, 752–753, 848–872, 907–908, 1402
Oswald Maes	† Roger 'Rogerke' Van de Wiele	1997–2003, 2004 (special)	Died during heart surgery in E1330. Later appeared as a ghost several times in the special: Afscheid van Florke (2004). In E3740 in S20 in 2015, he appeared with Florke, Frank and Simonne on TV when Sam and Tim were in a nursing home through archive footage from E1045 which broke the fourth wall and foreshadowed that Simonne was Sam's biological mother. In E4906 in S26 in 2020, he appeared in a flashback with Florke and baby Kaat (then Franky) through archive footage when Frank was planning to sell his house and was nostalgically reminiscing about the memories there.	182–1335, Special: Afscheid van Florke (2004)
Brecht Callewaert (also appeared in E16–18 in S1 in 1996 as Shaft Jan Weyns)	Reggie	2002	Arrested for theft	1171–1214, 1248–1315
Anton Cogen	baker Teugels	2002	Absconded after he stopped working with Willy because of Marianne's behavior	1304
Robert Borremans (also appeared in E13–69 in S1 in 1996 as Karel Briers)	Mayor Lemeyere	2002	Absconded. Meanwhile, replaced by another mayor.	1275–1277, 1314
Season 8
Werner De Smedt	Senne	2000–2002	Absconded after having dumped by Eva and Marie	984–1240
Ann Ceurvels	† Valerie Wijndaele (formerly Vera Vinck)	1998–2002	Moved to Australia. Later on it is revealed she has died	530–1235
Doris Van Caneghem	Felicienne Lejeune	1995–2002	Absconded after she resigned as a cleaning lady and retired to care for her demented husband Roger(ke) (the other Roger).	1–622, 659–699, 1038–1081, 1127–1235
Leon Van De Weyer	Felicienne's Roger(ke)	2002	Absconded after Felicienne resigned as a cleaning lady and retired to care of him. Rogerke suffered from dementia. He was mentioned earlier when Florke also started a relationship with someone called Roger(ke), which caused a misunderstanding between Felicienne and Florke as both men had a white moustache and both were pigeon fanciers. However, it turned out that Florke was talking about Roger Van de Wiele.	1235
Ria Cassauwers	Marcella	1998–2002	Absconded	401–417, 486–519, 564, 777, 811, 842–852, 964, 1232
Herlinde Hiele	Sabine Verbist	1999–2001	Moved with her mother Linda to South Africa	665–1190
Annemarie Picard (also appeared in E48–86 in S1 in 1996 as Agnes Raemaeckers-Vervust and in E3067–3068, 3117–3135, 3172–3174 in S17 in 2011–2012 as Martha)	Meester Rochussen	2002	Absconded after the trial between Simonne and Luc	1176–1180
Bart Van den Eynde (also appeared in E500 in S4 in 1998 as the municipal secretary and in E5381 (voice), 5382–5440 in S28 in 2023 as Victor Stiers)	Mayor Raymond Sorel	2002	Absconded after the wedding of Werner and Valerie. Meanwhile, replaced by another mayor.	1140
Season 7
Liesbeth Adriaenssens (also appeared in E1892–2000 in S11 in 2005–2006 as Maaike Mertens)	Lotte Van Baelen	2001	Fled away to South Africa with Dirk, Linda and Kristoff	974–1000
Mieke Bouve	Linda Lievens	1999–2001	Arrested by the police for the murder of Pierre, escaped and fled to South Africa with Kristoff, Dirk and Lotte	661–1000
Michael De Cock	Kristoff Verbist	1997–1999, 2000–2001	Fled away to South Africa with Linda, Dirk and Lotte	301–740, 853–1000
Bert Cosemans	Dirk Van Baelen	2000–2001	Fled away to South Africa with Lotte, Linda and Kristoff	882–1000
Jan Schepens	† Pierre Vinck	2000, 2001 (video)	Shot dead by Linda in E914. Later appeared in E973 in a video for his will.	766–915, 973 (video)
Chris Cauwenberghs	† Fernand Verbist	1995, 1996, 1997–2000, 2004 (special)	Died in a cellar fire started by Pierre in E850–851. He first broke his neck by Pierre pushing him down the stairs and was later burned. Later appeared together with Rogerke as ghosts in the special: Afscheid van Florke (2004)	2–3, 51–61, 94–154, 184–190, 221–226, 280–851, Special: Afscheid van Florke (2004)
Season 6
Camilia Blereau (also appeared in Special: Afscheid van Florke (2004) as Madeleine Rousseau and in E3566–3570, 3598–3834, 3980–3919, 3950–4025 in S19–21 in 2014–2016 as Hélène Symons)	The mayor	2000	Absconded after the wedding of Dré and Jenny. Meanwhile, replaced by another mayor.	830
Martine De Kok	Mira	1999–2000	Absconded after she ended her relationship with Joeri	552–788
Donald Madder	Thomas 'Tom' De Decker nr. 1	1995–2000	Donald Madder died in a car accident. In the series it was told he suddenly moved abroad. Several years the character returned, now played by Wim Stevens	1–341, 396–461, 606–783
Marleen Maes	Liliane Deroep	1996–2000	Absconded	150–201, 232–304, 336–514, 559–560, 617–619, 765
Kurt Vandendriessche	Frederique Wouters-Bastiaens (or Fréderique)	1997–1999	Absconded after the breakup with Eva	236–255, 289–544, 671–738
Paul-Emile Van Royen	Gaston Vercammen	1999	Moved back to Spain to Angèle. Later it turned out that Angèle no longer had a relationship with Gaston when she returned in S10.	606–724
Jos Geens	Rudi Sterckx	1996–1999	Absconded, it later turned out that he had resigned from Vercammen	30–48, 100, 152–165, 206–259, 412, 498–501, 559–561, 662–671, 701–724
Axel Daeseleire	Robbe Cannaerts	1996–1998, 1999	Left for his work abroad after another disagreement between him and Peggy	48–273, 456–460, 697–705
Piet Balfoort & Mariette Van Arkkels (Mariette Van Arkkels also appeared in E3740–3745 in S20 in 2015 as sister Scholastika/ Josepha De Wispelaere)	customer & wife	1999	Both appeared once as a customer and his wife	672–673
Knarf Van Pellecom (also appeared in E2760, 2794, 2833, 2994–2995, 3200, 3290, 3749, 4300, 4664–4665, 4671, 4829, 4949, 5040, 5234–5235, 5400 in S15–18, 20, 23–28 in 2010, 2011, 2012, 2015, 2017, 2019, 2020, 2021, 2022, 2023 as the mayor and is currently one of the crew members of the soap)	Doctor Cuppens	1999	Absconded after Kristoff was allowed to leave the hospital where he was due to injuries caused by an accidental shot from Joeri during the confrontation with Jacques	657–664
Kris Cuppens	Jacques "Stanny" De Coster	1999	Arrested and in prison for numerous burglaries, the murder of Mr. Mertens, and the attempted murder of Kristoff	617 (voice), 620–659
Season 5
Bert Vannieuwenhuyse (also appeared in E1977 in S11 in 2006 as a customer of the disco where Sofie and Aïsha visited)	Philemon 'Phile' Ceulemans	1998–1999	Absconded after he and Polle confronted Kristoff in De Flink with Joeri's syringe which made it clear that Joeri was in danger and led Kristoff to confront Jacques	468–554, 582–585, 641–655
Kristiaan Lagast	Jeweler Van Camp	1999	Absconded after Kristoff knew what code he used for the safe before the planned burglary	650
Ria Verschaeren	Lili Mertens	1999	Absconded after visiting Rosa while she was grieving the murder of her husband exactly three years ago during a burglary at their home, she revealed to Peggy that her husband had survived the fall down the stairs but was then murdered, leading Peggy to confront Kristoff, who began to uncover the truth.	633–634, 650
Uncredited actor or extra	† Mr. Mertens	1999	Appeared in a flashback of Kristoff three years before the events of E650. He was initially thought to have died after Kristoff and Jacques were caught breaking into his house, during which Kristoff pushed him down the stairs and broke his neck. Later, unbeknownst to Kristoff, who believed he was responsible for his death, it was revealed that he had survived the fall but had been killed by Jacques.	634 (flashback)
Els Olaerts	Kristien Michiels nr. 2	1999	Absconded and left with her family after Harry fled abroad with Clio, her sister Ingrid's daughter, while they were normally supposed to take care of Clio. The leads to where Harry and Clio were eventually led to a dead end	556–571, 579–580, 602–620
Karel Vingerhoets	Harry Moeyaerts	1996–1999	Fled abroad (possibly Spain) with Clio because he still saw himself as her father as he always took care of her with Ingrid before the latter died. The leads to where Harry and Clio were eventually led to a dead end	47–600
Arthur Van Eeghem	Koen(the)	1996, 1997, 1999	Absconded after Harry agreed that Clio would be cared for by Kristien, Jos and Koen. Harry later fled abroad with Clio when he saw the opportunity. Koen and his family absconded completely when the search for Harry and Clio came to a dead end. Koen had a twin brother, Bertje, who died in an accident when Ingrid was babysitting him when he was four years old. Bert was constantly rocking in his chair. Just as Ingrid was going to the kitchen, Bert fell badly and died. This happened before the events of S1.	93–98, 181–182, 579–580
Wim Danckaert (also appeared in E1631–1640, 1706–1745, 2428–2565, 2597–2598 in S10, 14 in 2004–2005, 2008–2009 as Sylvain Geens and in E5735–5766 in S30 in 2024 as Lieven Cremers)	Jos	1999	Absconded after Harry agreed that Clio would be cared for by Kristien, Jos and Koen. Harry later fled abroad with Clio when he saw the opportunity. Jos and his family absconded completely when the search for Harry and Clio came to a dead end.	579–580
Ann Hendriks	† Ingrid Michiels	1996–1998	Died in a car accident in E530–531. She was driving Clio to the doctor, but a fast oncoming car (Werner) came, causing Ingrid and Clio to end up in the water with the car. Clio was rescued by Valerie (who made her entrance), but Ingrid died and was found days later. Appeared as a corpse at her funeral shortly afterward.	47–352, 392–422, 449–535
Uncredited actor or extra	The mayor	1998	Absconded after the double marriage of Frank with Simonne and Florke with Rogerke. Meanwhile, replaced by another mayor.	500
Bart Van den Eynde (also appeared in E1140 in S7 in 2002 as Mayor Raymond Sorel and in E5381 (voice), 5382–5440 in S28 in 2023 as Victor Stiers)	the municipal secretary	1998	Absconded after the double marriage of Frank with Simonne and Florke with Rogerke.	500
Season 4
Leo Dewals	inspecteur Paul 'Pol' Tibbax	1997–1998	Absconded after Frank, Jenny and Bianca were acquitted in the trial surrounding Neil's murder. He was there as a witness regarding his investigation into Neil's death and the interrogation of Frank, Jenny and Bianca.	327–363, 415–438, 460 (was already added in the opening credits from E326)
Luc Springuel	Jos Sanders	1996, 1997, 1998	Absconded after Frank, Jenny and Bianca were acquitted in the trial surrounding Neil's murder. He was there as a witness regarding his investigation into Neil's death and the interrogation of Frank, Jenny and Bianca.	135–138, 292–198, 417–460
Jaak Van Assche (credited as Jaak Vanassche)	Vercruysse	1997–1998	Absconded after Frank, Jenny and Bianca were acquitted in the trial surrounding Neil's murder. He was there as a witness where it was about the conflict between Frank and Neil when they were in prison and he spoke negatively about Frank.	235–262, 418–460
Theo Hijzen	Mark Goethals	1996, 1997, 1998	Absconded after he met lawyer Swerts and Luc who wanted to know what happened to Frank, Jenny and Bianca who were questioned in the investigation into Neil's murder	35–36, 112–116, 292–298, 426–433
Gert Lahousse (also appeared in E2335–2344, 2464–2469 in S13–14 in 2008 as Rudi De Moor)	† Neil Feyaerts	1996–1997, 1998	Murdered by Jenny in E265–266 who bashes his skull in with the heavy base of a trophy that Lou won at a horse riding competition after he raped Bianca a second time in her room. His body was buried in the stables of Hof Ter Smissen by Frank, Jenny and Bianca, but was later discovered and the trio ended up in a court case where they were acquitted. Appeared after his death through his corpse and imagination and last seen in E431.	10–30, 163–292, 325–327, 431
Filip Peeters	Serge De Keukeleire	1997, 1998	Absconded after he admitted that Frank told him he had buried Neil, which quickly led Tibbax to believe that Frank had killed Neil	237–262, 323–325, 418–423
Vicky Florus	Rebecca De Taeye	1996–1998	Absconded	100–171, 198–276, 317–421
Sofie Segebarth	Sarah Wouters-Bastiaens nr. 2	1997–1998	Rejected by Tom	251–298, 330–342, 411–421
Koen De Bouw	Louis 'Lou' Swertvaeghers	1996–1998	Left with Ann abroad (Tuscany). It later turned out that Ann broke up with Lou when she returned in S7.	95–315, 350–394
Suzanne Saerens	Marijke Wouters	1996–1998	Absconded after Eva used a trick to make her believe that Frederique was not with her	144–224, 278–308, 334–335, 375–377
Katrien Vandendries (also appeared in E3564–3569, 3621–3900, 4130 in S19–22 in 2014–2016, 2017 as Lena Blondeel)	Carolien Jacobs	1996–1998	Left after she ended her relationship with Werner	20–73, 110–185, 266–365
Rudy Morren	François Chevalier	1997	Left to abroad. He got Ingrid pregnant and she gave birth to Clio making him Clio's biological father. Harry was Ingrid's sweetheart so he was considered Clio's father	247–291, 345–348
George Arrendell & Yves Lambrechts	Henchmen	1997	Absconded after the two had made a plan with François to retrieve the jewels hidden at Rebecca's in Ingrid's house, they had to lure Ingrid away, and François would then go to Rebecca himself to find the jewels. After the plan they would give money to the creditors so that they would be free	347
Leo Madder	Charles 'Carlos' Bastiaens	1996–1997	Returned to Belize	101–155, 199–255, 292–341
Jo Decaluwe (credited as Jo De Caluwe)	Piet Stevens	1997	Absconded.	260–269, 322–323
Season 3
Paula Sleyp	Martje	1997	Left after Florke was very disappointed with her and wanted her to leave immediately because she wanted a life with Rogerke	250–260
Several cats	† Voodoo (Bianca's cat)	1997	Probably poisoned in E248 by Veronique with rat poison as she made an earlier attempt to poison Voodoo	242–249
Hugues Hausman (also appeared in E2268, 2320–2346 in S13 in 2007–2008 as Steurs and in E3189–3218 in S17–18 in 2012 as Roy)	gendarme Didier Mercier	1997	Both absconded after Marianne drove back home despite her driving ban due to having drunk too much. They both spoke French like their actors.	246–247
Rudi De Rooms	gendarme Thiry	1997	Both absconded after Marianne drove back home despite her driving ban due to having drunk too much. They both spoke French like their actors.	246–247
Several horses	† Racer (Peggy's horse)	?–1997	Put to sleep by Lou with Peggy's permission due to a serious illness	?–238
Bert Van Tichelen (credited as Albert Van Tichelen)	inspecteur Smets	1997	Absconded after Bennie's arrest	220–235
Sjarel Branckaerts	† Robert/Louis Vercammen	1996, 1997	Run over by Rudi by accident at the entrance of his company Sanitair Vercammen and died instantly in E233–234. After the events of the first-season finale, in order to demand higher damages from Frank, Vercammen pretended to have amnesia for a while. After it was decided that there would be no additional compensation, an argument broke out between him and his daughter Leontien. He removed her position in the company and left the business in a rage without paying attention, meaning that neither he nor Rudi could avoid the collision. There is doubt about Vercammen's first name. In E45, he was repeatedly called Robert by Simonne, but in E226 however, at Frank's trial, the judge states that his full name is "Louis Vercammen". His future grandson Lowie was named after him, so Louis is most likely his first name.	33–46, 74–100, 130–142, 211–234
Anne Mie Gils	Gerda Van de Wiele	1997	Went back to her own house	214–231
Frans Van der Aa	Oswald 'Ozzi' Sterckx	1996–1997	Absconded after the lawsuit between Frank and the Vercammen family where he was Frank's lawyer. He is Rudi's cousin.	157–227
Rik Andries	† Walter De Decker	1995–1997	Suffered a brain hemorrhage while walking with Marianne on the beach and died a few days later in a local hospital. He was cremated in E220. Many years later in season 26, he played a major role again, when it was discovered that he had raped Tania at a surf club when she was underage and when his marriage to Marianne was at a low point. This led to the birth of Xander, who was also his son and which led to the latter aggressive search for his biological father who he thought was Tom and the tensions at the beginning of S26. Later, this discovery, which was kept secret by the De Decker-Bastiaens family, was leaked openly by Alexander and a journalist during the feud between him and the family, making everyone, including Rosa, aware of what Walter had done.	1–213
Several ducks	† Kamiel (Felicienne's duck)	1996	Run over by a car	148–175
An Miller	Sarah Wouters-Bastiaens nr. 1	1996	Replaced by actress Sofie Segebarth	152
Jean-Paul Van Steertegem	Herman Van Clamp	1996	Absconded after Rebecca stopped working with him	115–148
Alexis Van Stratum (credited as Alex Van Stratum)	† Pieter-Jan	1996	Died in a self-initiated fire in the stables of Hof Ter Smissen. He had Bennie store the stolen goods for money and wanted to cover his tracks.	105–134
Katrien Meganck	Kristien Michiels nr. 1	1996	Absconded after her visit to her sister Ingrid and later replaced by actress Els Olaerts	93–98
Season 2
Elisabeth Boor	Jessica	1996	Left with Elke	82–90
Veerle Luts	Elke Vervust	1996	Left with Jessica	20–90
Marc Schillemans (also appeared in E1835–1836 in S11 in 2005 as chairman Balie)	Jean-Paul Vervust	1996	Absconded after he accepted the relationship between his daughter Elke and Jessica and who they are	64–89
Annemarie Picard (also appeared in E1176–1180 in S7 in 2002 as Meester Rochussen and in E3067–3068, 3117–3135, 3172–3174 in S17 in 2011–2012 as Martha)	Agnes Raemaeckers-Vervust	1996	Moved to France with Leon	48–86
Pierre Callens	John De Brabander	1996	Kicked out by Ann after it turned out he was married with someone else (Carla Hoogewijs) and they have two children. Last seen in E85 with Walter.	9–54, 85
Luk De Koninck (actor) (also appeared in E3709–4034, 4070–4110 in S20–22 in 2015–2016 as William "Henri" Degreef)	Marc Van den Bakker	1996	Absconded. He was a childhood sweetheart of Rosa's who was suspected of being Peggy's father. This turned out not to be the case, and Frank was Peggy's father.	74–84
Jeroen Maes	Steven	1996	Absconded after the cycling project with Tom and Robbe in collaboration with Jean-Paul went wrong	12–83
Robert Borremans (also appeared in E1275–1277, 1314 in S8 in 2002 as Mayor Lemeyere)	Karel Briers	1996	Absconded	13–69
Willy Vandermeulen	Leon Raemaeckers	1996	Moved to France with Agnes	51–66
Jos Van Geel (also appeared in E1307–1348, 1433–1434 in S8 in 2002–2003 as Francis and in E2472–2474, 2503–2532, 2606–2622, 2686–2687 in S14–15 in 2008–2009 as Pierre Snackaert)	Dedonder, the union representative	1996	Absconded	30–53
Guido De Craene (also appeared in E1968–1986 in S11 in 2006 as bartender of "'T Schandaal")	Dirk	1996	Absconded after the breakup with Rosa	32–51
Miek Van Boxstaele	Hannah	1996	Left after Tom broke up with her	7–43
Steph Baeyens	inspecteur Demos	1996	Absconded after a police interrogation with Mark Goethals at Tom	35–36
Several canaries	†? Woodstock II (Bianca's canary)	1996–?	Absconded (His cage could have been moved to another room, he could have died or simply been sold.)	24–?
Several canaries	† Woodstock I (Bianca's canary)	1995–1996	Frank forgot to feed him and found him dead in his cage. He bought another canary (Woodstock II) so that Bianca wouldn't find out.	1–23
Season 1

== Actors and actresses playing multiple characters and recasts ==
Some characters are played by multiple actors or actresses. This includes characters that first appeared as children and were played by multiple kids or babies before they got regular actors or actresses.

- The transgender Kaat Bomans (formerly Franky Bomans) appears in multiple ways. As Franky he was first played by several babies and children including as baby by actress Britt Das (daughter of Marleen Merckx) from 1998 until 2003 in episodes 491–1466. From 2003 until 2009 in episodes 1468–2610 he was played by first regular actor Josip Koninckx. In 2009 when the character became older and became more important he was played by Braam Verreth until 2011 in episodes 2611–3000. From 2011 until 2013 and again 2015 in episodes 3001–3441 and 3807–3810 he was played by Jef Hoogmartens. The character went to America to become a trans woman and she returned as Kaat Bomans. Since then from 2016 until 2019 and again 2025 in episodes 3923, 3947, 3960–4512, 4589–4698, 5778–5808 she is played by Leen Dendievel.
- Hannah Cremers was played by several babies and children from 2015 until 2022 in episodes 3895-before 5255 but since 2022 since episode 5255 she is played by Léonore Mol.
- Vic Vlerick was played by several babies and children from 2017 until 2024 in episodes 4126-season 29 but since 2024 in episode 5714 and credited since episode 5760 he is played by Louis Dekuyper.
- Jaan Bakkal is played by several babies and children (in his first appearance a doll was used) since 2021 in episodes 5040.
- Britney 'Britt' Van Notegem was played by several babies and children from 2006 until 2018 in episodes 2025–4442 but since 2018 since episode 4448 she is played by regular Apollonia Sterckx.
- Lowie Bomans was played by several babies and children from 2003 until 2007 in episodes 1435–2306 before Leontien Vercammen fled with him to Mexico. Since he returned in 2012 in episodes 3275–4030, 4069–4070, 4166-ongoing he is played by Mathias Vergels.

== Family trees ==
Bomans family tree

- Florke Rousseau (deceased 2003) married Stafke Bomans (deceased), married Roger Van De Wiele (deceased 2002) (1999–2002, his death)
  - Frank Bomans
    - Bianca Bomans (born CIR 1976) out of marriage with Jenny Verbeeck (?–1996, divorced due to his affair with Simonne)
    - Peggy Verbeeck (born CIR 1976) out of an affair with Rosa Verbeeck
    - Franky Bomans (born 1998) out of marriage with Simonne Backx (m.1999–2007, separated in 2006, signed divorce papers on 1 June 2007) but remarried her.
  - Luc Bomans
    - Unborn child from rape of Simonne Backx
    - Lowie Bomans (born 2003) from marriage with Leontien Vercammen (m.2001 onwards, separated 2003–2005, 2007 onwards after his affair with Marie Van Goethem). Leontien ran away abroad and took Lowie with her.

Bastiaens family tree

  - Marianne Bastiaens and Walter De Decker (m. ? – 1997, his death, separated 1990–1995). She remarried with Geert Smeekens, the father of Sandrine Verbeelen.
    - Ann De Decker dating Sandrine Verbeelen (2007) who died of an intracranial hemorrhage. Ann started a new relation with Mayra (2011). Ann adopted the baby of Peggy and called her Sandrine.
    - Tom De Decker who is together with Peggy.
  - Charles Bastiaens married ? (separated)
    - Sara Bastiaens
    - Frederique Bastiaens
  - Claire Bastiaens
  - Carlos Bastiaens
  - ? Bastiaens
    - Eric Bastiaens
      - Michaël Bastiaens (son from Eric Bastiaens' first marriage)
      - Sam Bastiaens (born CIR 1984) from marriage to Martine Lefever (m.?–2005, remarried 2007–)
      - Sofie Bastiaens (born CIR 1986) with Martine Lefever

=== Bomans/Verbeeck/Backx ===
Staf Bomans	Florke Bomans
Frank Bomans	Jenny Verbeeck	Rosa Verbeeck	Luc Bomans	Leontien Vercammen
Mo Fawzi	Bianca Bomans	Lowie Bomans
Robin Bomans
Peggy Verbeeck	Tom De Decker
Simonne Backx	Sandrine De Decker
Kaat Bomans

=== Bastiaens/De Decker ===
Emma Raeymaeckers	Geert Smeekens	Marianne Bastiaens	Walter De Decker	Charles Bastiaens	Marijke	Claire Bastiaens	?	?
Sandrine Verbeelen	Martine Lefever	Eric Bastiaens	?
Bianca Bomans	Tom De Decker	Peggy Verbeeck	Ann De Decker	Sara Bastiaens	Frederique Bastiaens	Michael Bastiaens
Robin Bomans	Sandrine De Decker	Sam Bastiaens	Sofie Bastiaens

== Episodes and seasons ==
This table below shows the aired episodes and seasons as of 2025. Most episodes are available on the on demand service VRT MAX.

Season	First broadcast	Episodes	Nr. of episodes	additional explanation
1	23 December 1995 – 26 April 1996	1–90	90	All episodes available. Episode 1 is a special episode and has a running time of approximately 51 minutes. The episode exceptionally aired originally on Saturday, 23 December 1995 before being repeated on Monday, 25 December 1995.
2	2 September 1996 – 2 May 1997	91–265	175	All episodes available.
3	1 September 1997 – 29 May 1998	266–460	195	All episodes available.
4	31 August 1998 – 28 May 1999	461–655	195	All episodes available. Episodes 500 and 610 are special episodes and have a running time of approximately 38 and 37 minutes respectively. A special called Thuis in 3D was broadcast once, which fell outside the normal broadcast schedule and was therefore never rebroadcast. The plot of the special revolves around this: Frank and Simonne visit a fitness center. Simonne wants to improve her fitness, while Frank is more interested in the women in the gym.
5	30 August 1999 – 26 May 2000	656–850	195	Episode 823 is unavailable.
6	4 September 2000 – 1 June 2001	851–1045	195	All episodes available. Episode 1000 is a special episode and has a running time of approximately 54 minutes.
7	3 September 2001 – 31 May 2002	1046–1240	195	Episodes 1049 and 1146 are unavailable. Episode 1180 is a special episode and has a running time of approximately 44 minutes.
8	2 September 2002 – 30 May 2003	1241–1435	195	Episodes 1277, 1340, 1341, 1342, 1349, 1373, 1397, 1414, 1416, 1417, 1419, 1421, 1423, 1424, 1426, 1429, 1430, 1432, 1433, 1434 and 1435 (season finale) are unavailable.
9	1 September 2003 – 28 May 2004	1436–1630	195	Episodes 1443, 1445, 1450, 1455, 1458, 1459, 1469, 1470, 1471, 1474, 1475, 1480, 1481, 1482, 1483, 1484, 1485, 1486, 1490, 1491, 1492, 1493, 1494, 1495, 1497, 1498, 1499, 1500, 1506, 1523, 1525, 1526, 1530, 1531, 1546, 1556 and 1560 are unavailable. Episode 1500 is a special episode and has a running time of approximately ? minutes. The Special: Afscheid van Florke (2004) was broadcast once between E1590 and E1591 on Saturday 3 April 2004.
10	30 August 2004 – 27 May 2005	1631–1825	195	All episodes available.
11	29 August 2005 – 2 June 2006	1826–2025	200	All episodes available. Episodes 1910 and 2000 are special episodes and have a running time of approximately 49 and 52 minutes respectively.
12	4 September 2006 – 1 June 2007	2026–2220	195	All episodes available.
13	3 September 2007 – 30 May 2008	2221–2415	195	All episodes available.
14	1 September 2008 – 29 May 2009	2416–2610	195	All episodes available. Episode 2500 is a special episode and has a running time of approximately 45 minutes.
15	31 August 2009 – 28 May 2010	2611–2805	195	Episode 2805 (season finale) is unavailable
16	30 August 2010 – 27 May 2011	2806–3000	195	All episodes available. Episode 3000 is not only the seasonfinale but is also a special episode and has a running time of approximately 46 minutes.
17	29 August 2011 – 1 June 2012	3001–3200	200	All episodes available.
18	27 August 2012 – 31 May 2013	3201–3400	200	All episodes available.
19	2 September 2013 – 30 May 2014	3401–3595	195	Episode 3462 is unavailable
20	1 September 2014 – 26 June 2015	3596–3810	215	All episodes available.
21	31 August 2015 – 24 June 2016	3811–4025	215	All episodes available. Episode 3893 is a special episode and has a running time of approximately 47 minutes. The special: Nergens beter dan Thuis was broadcast once right after episode 3893 on Wednesday 23 December 2015. In the behind the scenes special, the then current cast discussed the best moments of 20 years of Thuis. It is the most recent special. So far, only season finales and midseason finales last longer.
22	29 August 2016 – 23 June 2017	4026–4240	215	All episodes available.
23	28 August 2017 – 14 June 2018	4241–4449	209	Episodes 4281, 4287, 4311 and 4420 are unavailable.
24	3 September 2018 – 28 June 2019	4450–4664	215	All episodes available.
25	2 September 2019 – 24 April 2020	4665–4835	171 (170)	All episodes available. E4834 was compiled into one big episode with E4835. Due to COVID-19 the complete season could not be recorded so the season ended on 24 April 2020 instead of 11 June. As filming was no longer possible the producers had to be inventive with the material they had, resulting in a choppy storyline in last episodes. (Note: Attributed to multiple references:)
26	31 August 2020 – 11 June 2021	4836–5040	205	All episodes available. Episode 4870 was the planned season finale of season 25, but became a regular episode.
27	30 August 2021 – 24 June 2022	5041–5255	215	All episodes available.
28	29 August 2022 – 30 June 2023	5256–5475	220	All episodes available.
29	4 September 2023 – 13 June 2024	5476–5679	204	All episodes available. Episode 5625 is the midseason finale of this season and has a running time of approximately 39 minutes.
30	2 September 2024 – 27 June 2025	5680–5894	215	All episodes available. Episode 5823 is the midseason finale of this season and has a running time of approximately 46 minutes.
31	1 September 2025 – 26 June 2026	5895–6109	215	All episodes available. Episode 5976 is the midseasonfinale of this season and the episode to celebrate Thuis's 30th anniversary. The episode has a running time of approximately 47 minutes.
32	31 August 2026 – 25 June 2027	6110–6324	215	Current season.

== Production ==
=== Intro and music ===
Each episode of Thuis begins with an opening. The main characters appear in the credits, accompanied by the series' theme song. Over the years, this credit, along with the theme song, has changed several times.

The first opening and theme song was used from season 1 to season 2 (E1–265, 23 December 1995 – 2 May 1997). The structure of the credits is characteristic of the 1990s. We see the characters in their familiar surroundings until they suddenly notice the camera, and the image freezes at that moment, with the character's first name and the full names of the actors and actresses displayed below. The lyrics of the title song Daar is thuis were written by Mary Boduin. The music itself was composed by Georges De Decker, and Isabelle A sang the song.

The second opening and theme song was used in season 3 (E266–460, 1 September 1997 – 29 May 1998). The credits structure has been slightly altered. We see the characters in their familiar surroundings, but this time archive footage is used and no new footage was filmed. This makes it easy to add new characters. On the left of the screen is a circle where the characters appear, with aerial footage of Ternat in the background. The characters move briefly until the frame freezes, with the character's first name and the full names of the actors and actresses next to them. This is the only intro that was only used for one season. The lyrics of the title song are again by Mary Boduin. The music itself was also composed by Georges De Decker, but this time Karen Moeremans sang the song. Karen Moeremans is the daughter of Thuis-actors Janine Bischops (Jenny Verbeeck) and Walter Moeremans (Leo Vertongen). The song was also called Daar is thuis.

The third opening and same theme song was used from season 4 to season 5 (E461–850, 31 August 1998 – 26 May 2000). The credits' structure has changed significantly this time around. The length of the previous credits has been retained, but because the characters are shown in pairs at the same time, they remain on screen longer. We see archive footage again, but this time promotional photos from an official photoshoot. However, fragments from the episodes can be seen in the background. The background of the previous credits—showing images of Ternat—has been retained, but this time it's overlaid with a semi-transparent newspaper-like background. These are again overlaid with other newspaper clippings featuring fragments from the series. This makes it easy to add new characters. The characters' photos slowly enlarge and then shrink, with the characters' first names and the full names of the actors and actresses written underneath. There are many versions of this credit, as it changes every week—every five episodes—according to the storylines and the importance of the characters. Each version can contain 18 characters (nine groups of two), arranged alphabetically according to the actors' and actresses' last names. Because of how important the storyline is, the actors Marleen Maes (Liliane Deroep) and Bert Vannieuwenhuyse (Phile Ceulemans) were only in the credits for one week. The theme song remained the same and it is the last time the theme song is called Daar is thuis.

The fourth opening, a new logo and a new theme song was used from season 6 to the middle of season 10 (E851–1734, 4 September 2000 – 20 January 2005). The opening credits structure follows the style of the second credits. New recordings were performed, unlike the two previous credits. The characters appear alternately on the left and right sides of the screen, with their living environments or leisure activities in the background. It is striking that Alexander van Bergen (Yves Akkermans) only has a left segment. The characters appear on screen, with the full names of the actors and actresses alongside them. For the first time in this credit sequence, the character's first name is no longer mentioned. There are many versions of this credit, as it changes every week—every five episodes—according to the storylines and the importance of the characters. Each version can contain 18 characters in the credit, which are arranged alphabetically according to the actors' and actresses' last names. The lyrics of the title song Je bent thuis were written by Winnie Enghien. The music itself was composed by Wim Claes and Gunther (Gene) Thomas, and Gunther (Gene) Thomas and Wendy Bellens provided the vocals.

When the TV1 network was renewed and renamed Eén, the intro had to be changed. This happened on 21 January 2005.

The fifth opening and the almost same theme song was used from the middle of season 10 to season 12 (E1735–2220, 21 January 2005 – 1 June 2007). The credits' structure has been thoroughly revamped. This time, the characters walk up and down the screen, with alternating pink, yellow, red, and orange panels in the background. Behind that, there's a blurry layer where the characters approach each other for a group photo. This final image clears up at the end of the credits. Next to the characters, their first names are once again listed, along with the full names of the actors and actresses. Each version, like the previous credits, can contain 18 characters. Unlike previous credits, the characters are now displayed completely randomly, not alphabetically. There are 19 versions of this opening. The group photo remained the same, meaning characters like Dré Van Goethem and Robert Swerts remained partly in the intro even though they were no longer seen in later episodes. This theme song's lyrics are almost identical to the previous one. The title song is a rework of the one from the previous theme song, which was also re-recorded. The lyrics for the title song Je bent thuis are once again by Winnie Enghien. The music itself was again composed by Wim Claes and Gunther (Gene) Thomas, and this time William Reven and Chantal Kashala provided the vocals.

The sixth opening and a brand new theme song was used from season 13 to season 14 (E2221–2610, 3 September 2007 – 29 May 2009). Viewers first see atmospheric shots of a scene or activity, and then two random characters from that scene appear. Since this happens five times in one version, there are ten characters in a single version. There are numerous versions of this credit, as it was randomly changed for each episode. It is the first opening where non-main characters also appeared: the children Franky, Lowie and Britney. The actors Merel De Vilder Robier (Bianca Bomans) and Wim Stevens (Tom De Decker) already appeared in the background of the intro from E2546 before they made their return in E2551. So it was unknown to the viewers who the man next to Bianca was, since Tom's role was now played by another actor. Also, sometimes characters remain in the group segment despite leaving the series (including Aïsha and Youssef). The lyrics of the title song Nergens beter dan thuis were written by Frank Dingenen. The music itself was composed by Steve Willaert and Will Tura, and Peter Evrard and Sofie Van Moll provided the vocals. Frank Dingenen previously appeared as an actor in the role of Police Chief Inspector Monard in E1994–2049, 2081–2119, 2186–2198–2235, 2270 in S11–13 in 2006–2007.

The seventh opening and the same theme song was used from season 15 to the middle of season 19 (E2611–3500, 31 August 2009 – 17 January 2014). In the intro we see each character individually performing an activity while the character's first name and the actor's or actress's full name are shown on a slanted bottom of the screen, each with a different color for each character. There are 3 versions of this intro. In the beginning, some of the activities of the characters in the previous intro were reused, including Yvette, Nancy, and Cois. Sometimes the introduction of some of the characters gets a new scene because of the storyline and intro is used longer. Sometimes characters appear in the intro of other characters (like Ann with Marianne and Rosa with Peggy). Emma and Stan also appear in Judith's intro, although neither are main characters at the time. The theme song Nergens beter dan thuis was shortened but the theme song remained the same with the same lyrics, same music makers and same singers (text: Frank Dingenen, music: Steve Willaert and Will Tura and singers: Peter Evrard and Sofie Van Moll).

The eight opening and a new theme song was used from the middle of season 19 to season 24 (E3501–4664, 20 January 2014 – 28 June 2019). This happened to celebrate Thuis reaching its 3500th episode. On 31 August 2015, the Eén network style was renewed under the motto Bij Eén zit je goed, with a new logo, but the intro remained the same. The concept differs only slightly from the previous intro. In the intro we see each character individually performing an activity while the character's first name and the actor's or actress's full name are shown with the character's first name printed in large letters. Some locations are visible in the background (such as Frank and Simonne's house, De Kabouters, and De Withoeve). At other times, the Leuven area is also visible. Again, there are multiple versions, so it's not the same every day. There are 7 versions of the intro. After a while, no new characters were added. Characters who left the series were dropped, but new roles didn't get a shot. Some existing characters did get a new shot (such as Nancy, Stan, Judith and Luc). Because of that, characters Angèle, Dieter, Dries, Karin, Kobe, Jacques, Tania, Thilly and Britney remained secondary characters for a long time. In the theme song Je bent thuis the lyrics and music were made by Roel De Meulemeester and Guy Balbaert. Sonny Vande Putte and Stefanie De Meulemeester provided the vocals. From this theme song onwards, the music and lyrics were made by the same people. This is also the latest theme song to feature a female vocalist. Despite the new name of the theme song, the slogan Nergens beter dan thuis was reused in the lyrics.
