= Kurt Vandendriessche =

Belgian actor

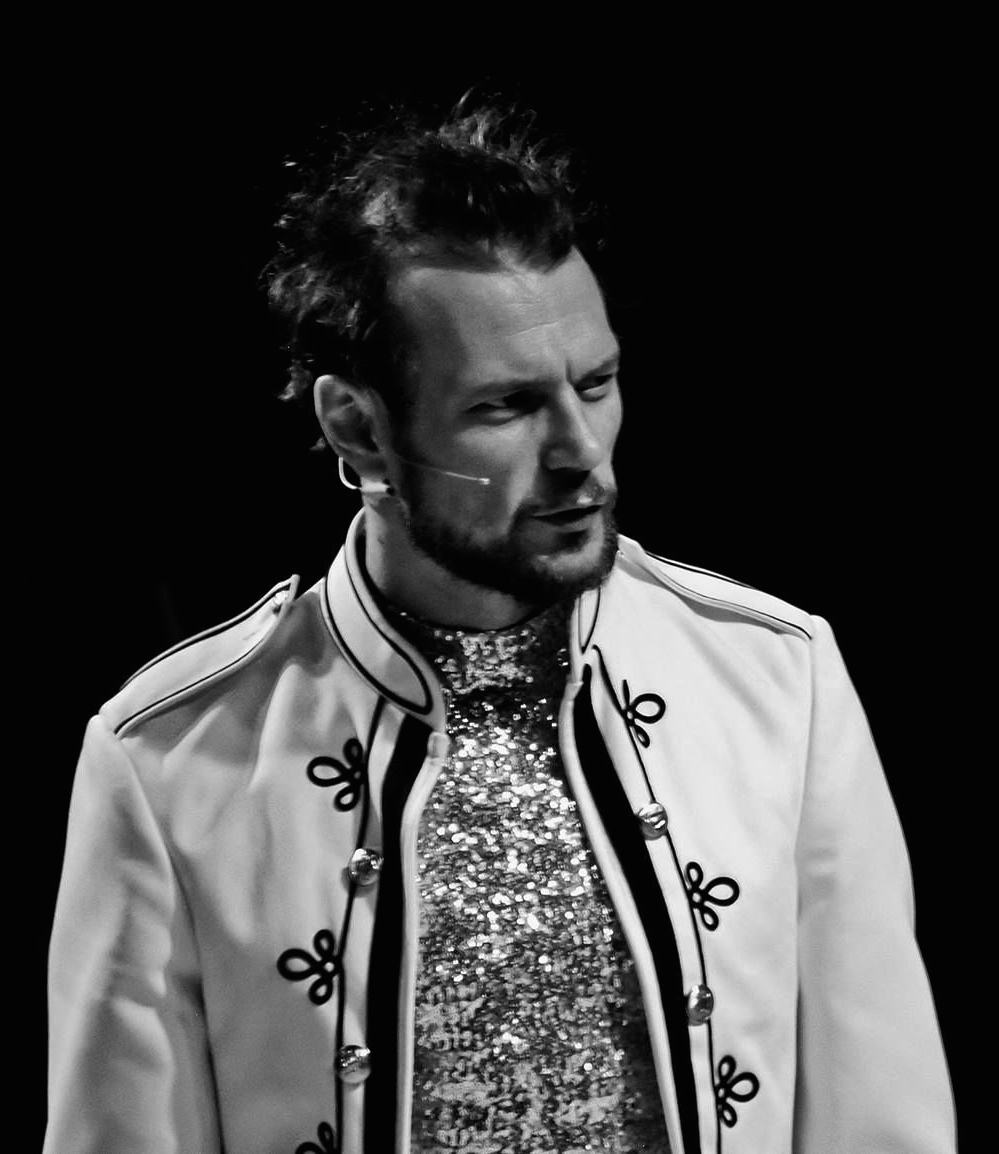
- Vandendriessche in Addio alla Fine (2013)
- Born: Roeselare, Belgium
- Other name: Kurt Van den Driessche
- Occupation: Freelance actor - theatre director - theatre designer
- Years active: 1996–present

Kurt Vandendriessche is a Belgian actor, theatre director and performer.

== Television ==
Vandendriessche made his debut on television in 1997 whilst finishing his actor's training at the Royal Conservatory of Brussels. He played the role of Fréderique Bastiaens in the national television drama series Thuis for two seasons. Some years later he played a regular part in the commercial television series Spoed, as the character of Tom Gijsbrecht.

During the past two decades he also featured in many guest roles mainly on Flemish television. Amongst others in Heterdaad, Recht op Recht, Flikken, Witse, Rupel, Zone Stad, Rang 1, Vermist, Aspe en Familie.

== Film ==
In 2007 he played Raymond in the movie Firmin, directed by Dominique Deruddere and based on the character of Chris Van Den Durpel. In 2012 he accepted the male lead role in Welcome Home, a low budget film directed by Tom Heene. The movie was internationally acclaimed and was nominated for the Luigi de Laurentiis Award for Best Debut on the Venice Film Festival and for one of the three Zenith Awards on Montreal World Film Festival. One year later, it competed in les Magrittes du Cinéma, the Walloon Community movie awards, for Best Flemish Co-production.

From time to time Vandendriessche also acts in short films - among others Saint James Infirmary (2010), directed by Leni Huyghe who received the award for Best Debut on the International Short Film Festival of Leuven, and Nkosi Coiffure (2015) from filmmaker and actress Frederike Migom, which was selected in the short film competition of the Montreal World Film Festival. Together with his brother, film director Benny Vandendriessche, he shot the short film Front (2014), commissioned by the Museum aan de Yzer. A drama set in the trenches and a tribute to the soldiers who experienced shell shock during World War I.

== Theater ==
Throughout his career Vandendriessche focused mainly on theater performance. In 1999, he made his debut as the groom in Federico García Lorca’s Bloodwedding. That same year he played the role of a homeless teen in Wolves, a location-based creation inspired by the photograph book Raised by wolves by Jim Goldberg. After that he stood at the side of Flemish theatre icon Nand Buyl in the first Belgian creation of Martin McDonagh's The Beauty Queen of Leenane at the National Theatre in Antwerpen (Toneelhuis).
In 2000, he joined the puppet theatre company Figurentheater De Maan for two years and over that period acquired substantial experience in puppeteering.

Following that, Vandendriessche performed in Jan Decorte's play Cirque Danton (2002), which is where he met Charlotte Vanden Eynde.
Together with her, he created the duet Map Me (2003) which received the prize of Best Dance Creation by the SACD. The piece toured for five years successfully throughout Europe and concluded with a mini tour in the US, passing through the Philadelphia Live Arts Festival, Portland's Time-Based Art Festival and Dance Theatre Workshop in New York.

Meanwhile, he attended a scenography course at the Ecole de Promotion Sociale Saint-Luc in Brussels and POPOK in Antwerp and in 2004 he created the light and stage design for Charlotte Vanden Eynde's Beginnings/Endings, which premiered on the Springdance Festival in Utrecht and the Kunstenfestivaldesarts in Brussels

From 2003 until 2007 he ran the theatre collective Scharlaken Dak together with theatre director and playwright Luc Frans. Their second production Mercurochroom (2004) received praise by the press and was mentioned in the newspaper De Morgen as one of the trend setting youth theatre productions of that year. In 2007 the company ceased to exist by lack of means of subvention.

In 2004 he collaborated for the first time with Jan Fabre, one of Belgium's leading visual artists and theatre directors, on the production Parrots & Guinea Pigs.
Some years later he joined the company again for a permanent replacement in Orgy of Tolerance (2010), as Prometheus in Prometheus: Landscape II (2011) and in the ensemble piece Tragedy of a Friendship (2012), an opera production on the works of Richard Wagner and his love-hate relationship with Friedrich Nietzsche, commissioned by the Flemish Opera.

For the Holland Festival in Amsterdam (2011–2013), he collaborated with Emio Greco on the dance production Addio alla Fine.

== Personal work ==
Throughout his career Vandendriessche also developed his own theatre productions, performances and installations as an independent artist.

In 2010, he created the show Pèrfides together with his five year old-daughter, in which he had himself directed by her.
For Collapsus in 2011, a project in which he participated with Ragna Aurich, he guided two young brothers in the creation of a personal sci fi-story on brotherhood and rivalry.

That same year he wrote and directed the piece KooiVogelDroom for Figurentheater De Maan - the story of a confused young child who learns to conquer his fears by learning to take responsibility for himself and others. For this piece he adapted a procedure of mixed media techniques - set in a blue key studio, he directly captured and edited the manipulation of scale models and landscapes made out of modified picture prints resulting in a live animation film.

In 2012 he formed K&K together with his colleague Kasper Vandenberghe. A satirical duo and situationist questioning of the vulnerable position of the performance artist and his economic potential. In that year, they sporadically showed stand up-performances and had themselves advised and supported by experts from the advertising industry in a campaign towards their final product launch K&K - Bringin- Home the Bacon.

== Filmography ==
Year	Title	Role	Director
2015	Nkosi Coiffure (shortfilm)	Stefan	Frederike Migom
2014	Follow: Tall tales from a small city	Ron	Jonas De Vos
2014	Labyrinthus	Agent	Douglas Boswell
2013	Front (shortfilm)	Soldier	Benny Vandendriessche
2012	Welcome Home	"Benji" Benjamin	Tom Heene
2011	Portable Life	Gypsyman	Fleur Boonman
2010	Saint-James Infirmary (shortfilm)	Lars	Leni Huyghe
2007	Firmin	Raymond	Dominique Deruddere
2004	TV-Dinner	Frank	Ian Swerts

== Television roles ==
Year	Serie	Title	Role	Episode
2014	Vermist	Jimmy	Michel Dierckx	S05 E10
2013	Familie		Daniël Verbeele	SE23 E07-40
2013	Binnenstebuiten	Bij nader inzien	Tom Bertels	SE01 E36
2012	Aspe	Verdwenen	Bram	SE09 E08
2012	Familie		garagist Rudy	SE22 E85-89
2011	Vermist	Dina	Jelle Waegemans	SE03 E05
2011	Rang 1		Ief	SE01 E01
2010	Witse	Achter de waarheid	Viggo Lanssens	SE07 E13-14
2010	Zone Stad	Ontsnapt	Marc Vercruysse	SE05 E07
2009	Flikken	Bonnie & Clyde	Dean De Vos	SE10 E05-05
2007	Spoed		Tom Gijsbrecht	SE10 E06-12
2005	Rupel	Met lege handen	Wim Haak	SE02 E01
2005	Zone Stad	Het huwelijk	novice agent Gert	SE02 E13
2005	Witse	Diabolo	Bart Brock	SE02 E09
2004	Spoed		Tom Gijsbrecht	SE07 E01-10
2003	Flikken	Sporen	Daan De Witte	SE05 E06
2003	Chris & Co	Toast Kannibaal		
2002	Spoed	De nieuwe	Steve Vermandel	SE04 E34
2001	Recht op Recht	Dochterlief	Matt	SE03 E07
2001	W817		DJ	SE03 E32
2000	F.C. De Kampioenen	Jonger dan je denkt	Maxime	SE11 E02
2000	De Kotmadam	Speldenkussen	agent	SE09 E04
1999–2000	Thuis		Fréderique Bastiaens	SE05 E34-163
1998	Heterdaad		Junkie	SE03 E08
1997	De Kotmadam	Jef maakt het bont	Joerie	SE06 E06
1996–1997	Thuis		Fréderique Bastiaens	SE01 E175-SE 03
