= Bob Van Der Veken =

Belgian actor (1928–2019)

- Van Der Veken in De Collega's (1978)
- Born: 26 September 1928; Antwerp, Belgium
- Died: 18 February 2019 (aged 90); Kalmthout, Belgium
- Occupation: actor

Bob Van Der Veken (26 September 1928 – 18 February 2019) was a Belgian actor.

== Early life ==
A familiar face on Belgian television, Van Der Veken's career began in 1956. He made well over 100 appearances. One of his most popular roles was that of Paul Thienpondt in the comedy series De Collega's. More recently, he has appeared in such popular Belgian TV series as Spoed, Alle maten, and Lili & Marleen. In 1992, he directed the television series Caravans.

Bob Van Der Veken died in February 2019, aged 90.

== Filmography ==
=== 2000s ===
- Het is ene van ons (2006) TV Episode .... Meneer Joost

.... Meneer Joost (1 episode, 2006)

- Grappa (2006) TV Series .... Opa*"Wet volgens Milo, De" .... Rechter (2 episodes, 2005)
- Eiland, Het .... Julien (1 episode, 2004)
- Geel! (2004) TV Episode .... Julien
- Pista! (2003) (TV) (as Robert van der Veken) .... Bompa
- FC de kampioenen .... Paul Tienpondt (2 episodes, 1996–2002)
- Spoed .... Jozef Sirou (1 episode, 2002)
- Liefde & geluk .... Meneer Vervoort (1 episode, 2001)
- Twee straten verder (2000) TV Series .... Man in rolstoel

=== 1990s and earlier ===
- Alle maten .... Aanbidder (1 episode, 1998)

- De Aanbidder (1998) TV Episode .... Aanbidder

- Deman .... Jacques Demeester sr. (1 episode)

- Moord en brand (????) TV Episode .... Jacques Demeester sr.

- Compromissen: De excellentie (1997) .... Bankier
- Wittekerke .... Onderzoeksrechter (1 episode, 1996–2001)

- Episode #3.73 (1996) TV Episode .... Onderzoeksrechter

- U beslist .... Opa (1 episode, 1996)

- Opa's centen (1996) TV Episode .... Opa

- She Good Fighter (1995) .... Voorzitter van de rechtbank
- Kan dat met gebakken aardappeltjes? (1993) .... Client in restaurant
- NMBS promotie (1993) .... Opa op de trein
- De Gouden jaren .... Albert (1 episode, 1992)

- Albert Chérie (1992) TV Episode .... Albert

- Caravans (1992) TV Series .... Tilebuis
- De Sikh-Story (1992) (TV) .... Politiecommissaris
- De Grijze man (1991) (TV) .... Oude man
- De Leraarskamer (1991) (TV) .... Vandam
- De Vrek (1989) (TV) .... Maître Jacques

... a.k.a. Avare, L' (Belgium: French title)

- De Kollega's maken de Brug (1988) .... Paul Tienpondt

... a.k.a. A Three-Day Weekend (Belgium: English title)
... a.k.a. Collègues font le pont, Les (Belgium: French title)

- Het Ultieme kerstverhaal (1987) (TV) .... Leo Binnemans
- Springen (1985) .... Timothy Tiendepenning

... a.k.a. Jumping (International: English title)

- Chorus Angelorum (1985) .... Steenackers
- 'n Schot in de Roos (1983) .... Pantalone
- Gloriant (1982) (TV) .... Oom Geeraert
- De Witte (1980) .... Mon

... a.k.a. Filasse (Belgium: French title)
... a.k.a. Whitey (International: English title)
... a.k.a. Witte van Sichem, De

- Tabula rasa (1979) (TV) .... Dielman Sr.
- De Collega's .... Paul Thienpondt (2 episodes)

- Het feest (????) TV Episode .... Paul Thienpondt
- Met pensioen (????) TV Episode .... Paul Thienpondt

- De Beverpels (1978) (TV) .... Von Werhrhahn
- De Eerste nowel (1977) (TV) .... Josef
- Het Mirakel van St. Antonius (1977) (TV) .... Dokter

... a.k.a. Miracle de Saint-Antoine, Le (Belgium: French title)

- De Opkopers (1977) (TV) .... Reparateur
- Klare taal (1977) (TV) .... W. Willems
- Rubens, schilder en diplomaat (1977) .... Heer X
- Tussen wal en schip (1977) TV Series .... Frans
- Lieve juffrouw Rosenberg, waarde Mr. Koonig (1977) (TV) .... Mr. Koonig

... a.k.a. Dear Janet Rosenberg, Dear Mister Kooning (International: English title)

- In perfecte staat (1977) (TV) .... Politiecommissaris

... a.k.a. in perfekte staat (Belgium: Flemish title)

- J.F. Willems (1976) (TV) .... Lezer
- De Herberg in het misverstand (1976) (TV) .... Drogist Dilissen
- De Danstent (1976) (TV) .... Veldwachter
- Prikkelpraatjes (1976) TV Series
- Dynastie der kleine luyden (1974) (TV) .... Martijn
- Rita's dagdromen (1974) (TV)
- Waar de vogeltjes hoesten (1974) .... Getraumatiseerde stadsbewoner
- Golden Ophelia (1974) .... Felix Bollen
- De Wiskunstenaars (1973) (TV) .... Dr. Urinaal

... a.k.a. Wiskunstenaars of 't gevlugte jufferjte, De (Belgium: Flemish title)

- Agamemnon (1973) (TV) .... Koorlid
- Een Boerin in Frankrijk (1973) TV Series .... Franse knecht
- Rip van Winckle (1973) (TV) .... Rip
- Bel de 500 .... Assistant / Mr. Fleuret (2 episodes)

- Het Diner (????) TV Episode .... Mr. Fleuret
- Hoofdpijn (????) TV Episode .... Assistant

- Bruiloft (1972) (TV) .... De jonge man

... a.k.a. Kleinbürgerhochzeit, Die (Belgium: German title)

- Gelukkige familie (1972) (TV) .... Mark

... a.k.a. The Happy Family (International: English title)

- Het Levende lijk (1972) (TV) .... Artjemjev de verklikker
- Dodendans (1972) (TV) .... De Dood
- De Vierde Man (1972) (mini) TV Series .... Inspekteur Keurvels
- Het Souterrain (1972) (TV) .... Law

... a.k.a. The Basement (International: English title)

- Tijl Uilenspiegel (1971) (TV) .... Koster
- Nijd (Hoofdzonde) (1971) (TV)
- Kontiki (1971) (TV)
- 30 zit- en 79 staanplaatsen (1971) .... Eyskens
- Christoffel Marlowe (1970) (TV) .... Poley
- Nand in eigen land (1970) (TV)
- Over mijn lijk (1970) (TV) .... Bob

... a.k.a. Over My Dead Body (International: English title)

- De Kleine hut (1969) (TV) .... Philip

... a.k.a. Petite hutte, La (Belgium: French title)

- Albert de Deken (1969) (TV) .... Albert De Deken

... a.k.a. Albert Deacon's Discovery (International: English title)
... a.k.a. Late ontdekking van Albert de Deken, De (Belgium: Flemish title)

- Ansfred (1969) .... Loketbediende
- De Kandidaat (1969) (TV)
- Princess (1969) .... President Sextra
- Prinses Zonneschijn (1968) (TV) .... Skjald
- Kent u de melkweg? (1968) (TV) .... Patient

... a.k.a. Kennen sie die Milchstrasse? (Belgium: German title)

- Vier kromme appelbomen (1968) (TV) .... Knock
- Beschuldigde sta op .... Bocarmé (1 episode, 1968)

... a.k.a. Hof van Assisen (Belgium: Flemish title: first episodes title)
- Visart de Bocarmé (1968) TV Episode .... Bocarmé

- Hamlet van Stepney Green (1968) (TV) .... Mr. Green

... a.k.a. The Hamlet of Stepney Green (International: English title)

- De Zoemende muzikant (1967) (TV) .... Vriend 1
- De Man telt niet mee (1967) (TV) .... Eduard

... a.k.a. Mari ne compte pas, Le (Belgium: French title)

- Dallas (1967) (TV) .... Journalist 2

... a.k.a. Dallas, 22 November 1963 (Belgium: Flemish title)

- Twee is te weinig, drie is te veel (1966) (TV)
- De 5de muur (1966) (TV) .... Rank
- De Man van het lot (1966) (TV) .... Napoleon
- Jeroom en Benzamien (1966) TV Series .... Jean Rosseels
- Shirley Holmes (1966) TV Series
- Sterf nooit voor je tijd (1965) (TV) .... Bediende
- My Fair Lagardère (1965) (TV) .... Cocardasse
- De Theaterdirecteur (1965) (TV) .... Chanteoiseau
- Robert en Bertrand (1965) (TV) .... Pinkerton
- Umataro (1965) (TV)
- Luckie Henkie (1964) (TV) .... Goede 'Ik'
- Cab. A. Pola (1964) (TV)
- Bolero (1964) (TV) .... Gillewaere
- De Tijdscapsule (1963) TV Series .... Inspecteur
- Het Uur der onschuld (1963) (TV) .... Sason
- De Roos en de kroon (1963) (TV) .... Harry Tully
- Cupido Dictator (1963) (TV) .... Roland
- Er wordt gedanst vannacht (1962) (TV)
- Violet (1962) (TV) .... J. Forester
- Het Wonderboompje (1962) (TV) .... Schoolmeester
- De 3 klaphoeden (1962) (TV) .... Don Dionisio
- 1 mei ballade (1962) (TV) .... Declamator
- Vijgen na Pasen (1962) (TV)
- Het Liefdeselixir (1962) (TV) .... Nemorino
- Carnaval Marmelade (1962) (TV)
- Flikki de Clown (1962) (TV)
- Bob Benny Show (1962) (TV) .... Acteur
- Het Proces Anderson (1962) (TV) .... J. Davidson
- Droomconcert (1961) (TV) .... Zanger
- Levende folklore (1961) (TV) .... Nandje
- Het Kraminkelpasteitje (1961) (TV) .... Kraminkeltje
- Onder moeder's paraplu (1961) (TV) .... Fotograaf
- Tijl Uilenspiegel (1961) TV Series .... Francastel
- Zieke tegen wil en dank (1961) (TV) .... Harlekijn
- Rodeo (1961) (TV) .... Koper
- Humoresk (1961) (TV) .... Student
- De Ondergang van de Eppie Reina (1961) (TV) .... Scholtens
- Een Eiland in het noorden (1961) (TV) .... Jan Hendrik
- Het Licht was vals (1960) (TV) .... Hugertje
- Anita, My Love (1960) (TV) .... Jongen 1
- Heer Halewijn (1960) (TV) .... Iwijn
- Dr. Alwetend (1960) (TV) .... Piet
- Hoe zotter, hoe liever (1960) .... Bruidegom

... a.k.a. Au plus fou, au mieux (Belgium: French title)
... a.k.a. The Dafter the Better (Belgium: English title)

- Uit een boek ontsnapt (1959) (TV) .... Tom
- De Heks (1959) (TV) .... Duivel
- De Schone slaapster (1957) (TV) .... Jacques D'Herrault
- De Schone en de roos (1957) (TV) .... Pantalone
- Roofridder Kanibabilis (1956) (TV) .... Faktotum
