= Van Der Veken =

Van Der Veken is a surname. Notable people with the surname include:

- Bob Van der Veken (1928–2019), Belgian actor
- Jan Van Der Veken (born 1975), Belgian illustrator
- Jef Van der Veken (1872–1964), Belgian art restorer and copyist
