= Brian Clifton =

Brian Clifton may refer to:

- Brian Clifton (footballer)
- Brian Clifton (composer)
