= Feyaerts =

Feyaerts is a Belgian surname. Notable people with the surname include:

- Fernand Feyaerts (1880–1927), Belgian swimmer and water polo player
- Wim Feyaerts (fl. 1991), Belgian television director
