= Steven De Lelie =

Belgian actor and theatre director

- Born: 25 February 1977 (age 49); Antwerp, Belgium
- Occupation: actor

Steven De Lelie (born 25 February 1977) is an actor and theatre director.

He is mostly known in the theatre world for his part in Kartonnen dozen (Cardboard Boxes), a monologue from a book by the same name by Tom Lanoye and De Libertijn (The Libertine). He also directed the theatre piece, The Jungle Book and a second production Inside the Moulin Rouge.

== Awards ==
In his role of Creon in Creon's Antigone, a play by Miro Gavran, he got an award for Best Actor in a protagonist role during the Holland Theatre festival.

== Notable roles ==
In the TV series Lili & Marleen, he played the part of Rikki, a young boy in the Antwerp of the '60s who finds himself falling for a girl who's not of his class, Vicky Muys, played by Grietje Vanderheijden.

In the TV series Familie, he plays the character Bertje Vandenbossche (originally played by Mout Uytersprot). After Bertje left for China five years ago, he is now back being more a hard business man ánd having a Chinese girlfriend. In these years in China, he got divorced from Tineke & started working in an IT-company where he met Cixi, his current girlfriend. Also he gained confidence and is more at it for the money than for the friendships.

In the play Kartonnen dozen, Steven plays the part of a young man who's trying to figure out the way through his sexuality. In the play, 3 cardboard boxes represent 3 eras in his life which he had to overcome.

== Filmography ==
- Lili & Marleen...Rikki Dilliarkis
- Spoed...Guest starring, Man with injury
- Familie...Bert Van den Bossche
- Pitt & Kantrop... Pitt
- Het Verstand van Vlaanderen (familiespecial)...himself

== Stage credits ==
- De Libertijn – theatre play – Raamtheater Antwerp... Baronet/secretary of the encyclopedia
- Kartonnen Dozen – theatre monologue – Raamtheater Antwerp... Tom Lanoye
- Inside Moulin Rouge – theatre play – director of the play
- The Jungle Book – theatre play – director of the play
