= Brian Clifton (composer) =

Belgian musician, composer and orchestrator

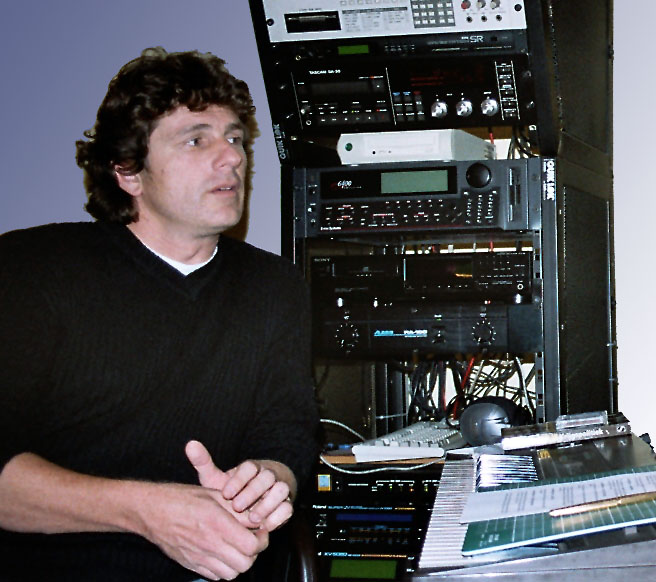

Background information
- Born: Dirk Thyssens; March 22, 1962 (age 64); Wilrijk, Belgium
- Genres: Film score
- Occupations: Composer, conductor, record producer
- Years active: 1984–present
- Website: www.brianclifton.be

Dirk Pilaet (born March 20, 1962, Wilrijk, Antwerp, Belgium), known professionally as Brian Clifton, is a Belgian musician, composer and orchestrator. He composed the music for over 30 films and television series, including De Kollega's Maken de Brug! (1988), the VRT series Alfa Papa Tango (1990-1991), the American movies Bird of Prey (1995) featuring Richard Chamberlain and Philippe Mora's Back in Business (1997), Ellektra (2004) starring Matthias Schoenaerts and Axelle Red, and Spike and Suzy: The Dark Diamond (2004).

Brian Clifton has been associated with film directors such as Vincent Rouffaer, Robbe De Hert and Nnegest Likké. Clifton is also known for composing the hymn for the Belgian First Division A, the top league competition for association football clubs in Belgium, TV commercials for ICI Paris XL and Christian Dior, and the End Titles for the 2005 Thai historical drama film The King Maker.

In recent years, he became a steady guest-lecturer at the Brussels film school RITCS-School of Arts.

== Selected works ==
=== Music for movies and series ===
- De Dwaling (1987) (mini) TV Series
- Het Ultieme kerstverhaal (1987) by Vincent Rouffaer
- A Three-Day Weekend (1988)
- Hoogtevrees (1988) by Vincent Rouffaer
- Sarah? Sarah (1989) by Jan Keymeulen
- Trouble in Paradise (1989) by Robbe De Hert
- Alfa Papa Tango (1990) TV Series by Vincent Rouffaer
- De Leraarskamer (1991) by Vincent Rouffaer
- Less Dead Than the Others (1992) by Frans Buyens
- De Ware vrienden (1993) TV Series by Vincent Rouffaer
- Over the Rainbow (1995) by Rudolf Mestdagh
- Bird of Prey (1995) by Temístocles López
- Bayou Ghost (1997) by Gardner Compton
- Back in Business - Heart of Stone (1997)
- Tot mijn laatste adem (2000)
- Hollywood aan de Schelde - part 1 (2001) TV Series by Robbe De Hert
- Saturday Night Fear (2001) by Jeroen Dumoulein
- Hollywood aan de Schelde - part 2 (2004) TV Series by Robbe De Hert
- Sprookjes (2004) TV Series
- Spike and Suzy: The Dark Diamond (2004) by Rudi van den Bossche
- Ellekra (2004) by Rudolf Mestdagh - Best Film Music Nomination at Syracuse Film Festival
- WaWa (2005) TV Series
- The King Maker (2005)
- Badoir (2005) by Diego Deceuninck
- Droomtijd (2006)
- Ghajaana (2006)
- Blinker en de blixvaten (2008) by Filip Van Neyghem
- Bobby en de Geestenjagers (2013) by Martin Lagestee
- Bingo (2013) by Rudi Van Den Bossche
- Andromeda (2013)
- Speculum (2014)
- I Wish My Life (2014)
- Echo (2015)
- Everything But a Man (2017) by Nnegest Likké

=== Music for musicals ===
- De Plattegrond van het Moeras by Lulu Aertgeerts
- The Holiday Love Show by Lulu Aertgeerts
- Malus by Brian Clifton
- Prins Blauwert (of Marc De Bel) by Vincent Rouffaer
