= Littau (disambiguation) =

Littau is a former municipality in Switzerland, now part of Lucerne.

Littau may also refer to:

- The German name of Litovel, Czech Republic
- Daniel Littau (born 1991), German actor
- Beatrice Littau (1902–1998), American soprano
