= Verschoten & Zoon =

1999 Belgian comedy TV series

- Verschoten & Zoon compilation DVD cover
- Written by: Bart Cooreman, An Swartenbroekx, Frank Dingenen, Gerrie Van Rompaey, Koen Tambuyzer, Steve De Wilde, Luc Moreels, Marc Peters, Bram Renders, Jan Schuermans, Nathalie Segers, Bart Vaessen, Koen Vermeiren
- Directed by: Filip Van Neyghem; Wim Feyaerts
- Starring: Jacques Vermeire; David Michiels; Ann Hendrickx; Martine Jonckheere; Frank Van Erum; Karen van Parijs
- Country of origin: Belgium
- Original language: Dutch
- No. of seasons: 8
- No. of episodes: 104

Production
- Running time: 25 min.

Original release
- Network: VTM
- Release: 30 August 1999 – 7 June 2007

Verschoten & Zoon was a 1999 Belgian comedy TV series. It was directed by Wim Feyaerts and written by Bart Cooreman and was produced in the Dutch language. It ran until 2007.

The show was a sitcom starring Jacques Vermeire as the proprietor of a garage. This main role was based on the greedy mechanic Dimitri De Tremmerie from the TV series F.C. De Kampioenen (F.C. The Champions). Vermeiren played that role from 1990 to 1998.

Actress Grietje Vanderheijden also made an appearance.

== Plot ==
Jacques Vermeire plays mechanic René Verschoten. His miserly nature regularly clashes with his wife Magda's shopping addiction.
