= Ellektra =

- Film poster
- Directed by: Rudolf Mestdagh
- Written by: Daniel Lambo; Rudolf Mestdagh
- Produced by: Rudolf Mestdagh
- Starring: Axelle Red; Matthias Schoenaerts
- Cinematography: Danny Elsen
- Edited by: Jan Hameeuw
- Music by: Brian Clifton
- Production companies: Canal Plus Flanders; Cosmokino; Schmidtz Katze Filmkollektiv; Eurimages; Mitteldeutsche Medienförderung (MDM)
- Distributed by: Kinepolis Film Distribution
- Release date: October 6, 2004 (Belgium)
- Running time: 103 minutes
- Countries: Belgium; Germany; Netherlands; France
- Languages: French; English; Dutch
- Budget: €1.5 million

Ellektra, also known as Ellen Calling, is a 2004 Belgian thriller drama film directed by Rudolf Mestdagh starring Axelle Red and Matthias Schoenaerts.

The film has won an award at the 2005 Slamdance Film Festival, 2 awards at the 2006 Cyprus International Film Festival including best cinematography, and an award at the 2005 Independent Film Festival of Boston.

== Plot ==
Following a tragic accident, a number of people lose their principal gift. A DJ loses his hearing, a perfume maker loses his sense of smell, a pianist loses her fingers. Hiding behind the mysterious name eLLektra, a young girl brings those people together through SMS and offers them comfort for their loss.

== Cast ==
- Axelle Red as Anna
- Matthias Schoenaerts as DJ Cosmonaut X
- Catherine Kools as Ellen aka Ellektra
- Gert Portael as Sam
- Julien Schoenaerts as Waiter
- Ellen Ten Damme as Ellen
- Marie Bos as Cynthia
- Manou Kersting as Cabron
- Lucas Van Ammel as Ludovic
- Han Kerckhoffs as Harry

== Accolades ==
Year	Association	Category	Recipient	Result
2005	Bogotá Film Festival	Golden Precolumbian Circle for Best Film	Rudolf Mestdagh	Nominated
2006	B-Movie Film Festival	B-Movie Award for Best Foreign Film	Rudolf Mestdagh	Won
2006	B-Movie Film Festival	B-Movie Award for Best Supporting Actress	Axelle Red	Won
2006	Cyprus International Film Festival	Best Cinematography	Danny Elsen	Won
2006	Cyprus International Film Festival	Best Production Design	Gert Stas	Won
