= Arlette Sterckx =

Belgian actress

- Born: 1964 (age 60–61); Belgium
- Occupation: actor

Arlette Sterckx (born 1964) is a Belgian television actress.

Although she has appeared in a number of television series since 1995 such as Editie and in two episodes of Flikken she is best known for her portrayal of Lies Weemaes in the Belgium Dutch language action drama TV series Spoed in which she acted as one of the lead characters in 204 episodes between the year 2000 and 2007. On Spoed she worked with acclaimed Belgian actor Leo Madder.

== See also ==
- Spoed
