= Back in Business (film) =

Stone Cold 2:Back in Business
- Movie cover
- Directed by: Philippe Mora
- Written by: Ed Decatur; Ash Staley
- Produced by: Peter McAlevey; Gary Wichard
- Starring: Brian Bosworth; Joe Torry
- Music by: Brian Clifton; Allan Zavod
- Distributed by: PFG Entertainment
- Release date: April 4, 1997
- Running time: 93 minutes
- Country: United States
- Language: English

Back in Business is a 1997 action film starring Brian Bosworth and Joe Torry. The film revolves around two policemen and their pursuit of drug runners and dirty cops.

== Plot ==
A former cop returns to active duty in an undercover mission for the FBI with his old partner. Their job is to catch drug runners as well as bust crooked cops, some of whom were behind the ex-cops' dismissal from the force.

== Cast ==
- Brian Bosworth as Joe Elkhart
- Joe Torry as Tony Dunbar
- Dara Tomanovich as Natalie Walker
- Alan Scarfe as David Ashby
- Aubrey Beavers as Remy
- Brion James as Emery Ryker
- Aleks Shaklin as Hank Berdsall
- Victoria Mahoney as Java

== German release ==
The film was released in Germany under the title Heart of Stone in May 1997. The German VHS release changed the title to Stone Cold 2 and marketed it as a sequel to Brian Bosworth's 1991 debut film Stone Cold.

== Reception ==
Critical reception for Back in Business has been negative. Empire Magazine described it as "Not very exciting, not very funny and hardly likely to promote either of its stars out of the low-rent sector, it cruises along like a very old car, you know it'll get to where it's going in the end but you don't want to go along for the ride."

TV Guide wrote that "Although the film gets some mileage out of the running gag about our hero's attempts to control his temper by speaking to a talk-radio psychiatrist, the film's false starts and detours are best exemplified by Bosworth's "Dukes of Hazzard"-like interplay with Torry. Trying way too hard to divert, BACK IN BUSINESS falls prey to extraneous explosions and lame comic relief." Entertainment Weekly rated the movie C−, stating that Bosworth's " fledgling charisma can’t save this clanking thriller".
