= De Collega's =

- Movie poster with the actors of the series
- Genre: Sitcom
- Created by: Jan Matterne
- Directed by: Jan Matterne; Vincent Rouffaer
- Country of origin: Belgium
- Original language: Dutch
- No. of seasons: 3
- No. of episodes: 37

Production
- Production location: Brussels
- Running time: 40 minutes

Original release
- Network: BRT
- Release: 9 September 1978 – 21 February 1981

De Collega's (The Colleagues) is a classic Belgian comedy TV series about colleagues working in an office of the Ministry of Finance. It originally aired for three seasons between 9 September 1978 and 21 February 1981 on the BRT. A total of 37 episodes was made. The series was written by Jan Matterne, who also directed the first season. The second and third seasons were directed by Vincent Rouffaer. The popular series was re-aired numerous times.

In 1988 a feature film was released, De Collega's Maken de Brug.

In 2018 another film was released, De Collega's 2.0. This film was an updated version of the original TV series with new characters. A handful of the original cast members guest starred.

== Origin ==
Jan Matterne turned in a proposal at the BRT, then the only Flemish broadcasting company, to make a television series about colleagues but it was rejected. Matterne decided to turn his idea into a theatre play which went on stage in 1976 by Mechels Miniatuur Teater, a professional theatre group based in Mechelen. The play was that successful BRT gave green light to produce the television series. The majority of the actors in the stage play reprised their role.

== Characters ==
- Paul Thienpondt (born 10 June 1920), played by Bob Van der Veken
- Philemon Persez (born 28 February 1940), played by René Verreth
- Mireille Puis (born 26 June 1949), played by Nellie Rosiers
- Jenny Vanjes (born 25 December 1923), played by Jenny Tanghe
- Bonaventuur Verastenhoven (born 29 August 1936), played by Mandus De Vos
- Thierry De Vucht (born 24 November 1950), played by Johny Voners
- Jean De Pesser (born 17 July 1940), played by Jaak Van Assche
- Gilbert Van Hie (born 26 March 1943), played by Tuur De Weert
- Jomme Dockx (born 28 February 1940), played by Manu Verreth
- Betty Bossé (born 18 March 1955), played by Tessy Moerenhout
- Kris Berlo (born 17 October 1958), played by Agnes De Nul
- Karolien Van Kersbeke (born 1 January 1958), played by Nora Tilley
- Hilaire Baconfoy (born 11 November 1931), played by Jacky Morel
- Arabelle Lucas (born 14 October 1921), played by Jo Crab
- Jan Clerckx (born 1 July 1934), played by Loet Hanekroot

== Episodes ==
Season 1

Episode 1: Met pensioen
Episode 2: De hoed
Episode 3: De valies
Episode 4: De stoel
Episode 5: Het huurhuis
Episode 6: De brief
Episode 7: De zoon
Episode 8: De ideeënbus
Episode 9: De liefde
Episode 10: De diefstal
Episode 11: De stembriefjes
Episode 12: Het feest

Season 2

Episode 1: De verhuizing
Episode 2: Alainke
Episode 3: De examens
Episode 4: De inspectie
Episode 5: De gijzeling
Episode 6: De nieuwe typiste
Episode 7: De bijverdienste
Episode 8: De archiefkamer
Episode 9: De tijdelijken
Episode 10: De aprilgrap
Episode 11: De groentewinkel
Episode 12: De plechtige communie
Episode 13: De vakantie

Season 3

Part 1: De muur
Part 2: Beeldende kunst
Part 3: De kwis
Part 4: De ruzie
Part 5: De enquete
Part 6: De computer
Part 7: De reddingsoperatie
Part 8: De robotfoto
Part 9: Het dossier
Part 10: De tijdelijke
Part 11: Eén man teveel
Part 12: De kantoortuin
