= Wim Feyaerts =

Belgian television director

Wim Feyaerts is a Belgian television director who specializes in the production of comedy.

== Career ==
Feyaerts has directed a number of popular mainstream television comedies in Belgium such as Verschoten & zoon in 1999 and De Kotmadam with Ronnie Commissaris since 1991.
