= Hotel 13 =

- Genre: Soap opera Mystery
- Opening theme: "Hotel 13" of Patrick Baehr, Marcel Glauche, Gerrit Klein
- Countries of origin: Germany; Belgium
- Original language: German
- No. of seasons: 2
- No. of episodes: 176+film

Production
- Running time: 11 minutes

Original release
- Network: Nickelodeon Germany
- Release: 3 September 2012 – 28 March 2014

Related
- Das Haus Anubis

Hotel 13 is a daily children's television program produced jointly by Belgian broadcaster Studio 100 and Nickelodeon Northern Europe. The series was filmed with a German cast in German and then dubbed into other languages for broadcast in Belgium, the Netherlands, Denmark, Sweden, and Poland. It was broadcast for two seasons, from 2012 to 2014. Each episode is 11 minutes long.

== Cast ==
=== Main ===
Actor	Rollname	Episode	Year
Patrick Baehr	Tom Kepler	1–176	2012–2014
Carola Schnell	Anna Jung	1–176	2012–2014
Jörg Moukaddam	Lenny Bode	1–176	2012–2014
Ilka Teichmüller	Ruth Melle	1–176	2012–2014
Gerrit Klein	Jack Leopold	1–120	2012–2013
Lion Wasczyk	Jack Leopold	121–176	2014
Peter Nottmeier	Richard Leopold	1–120	2012–2013
Marcel Glauche	Florian "Flo" Tuba	1–120, 162–167	2012–2014
Hanna Scholz	Victoria von Lippstein	2–168	2012–2014
Julia Schäfle	Liv Sonntag	4–120	2012–2013
Sarah Thonig	Liv Sonntag	121–176	2014
Jan-Hendrik Kiefer	Noah	121–176	2014
Jamie Watson	Zoe	129–176	2014

=== Supporting ===
Actor	Rollname	Episode	Year
Antje Mairich	Marion Kepler	1	2012
Alice Toen	Amalia Hennings	2–119	2012–2013
Karen Hempel	Serena von Lippstein	5,13,74–77	2012–2013
Jan-David Bürger	Mark	11–15	2012
Rick Mackenbach	Brandon Goodman	21–25	2012
Willy Seidel	Vincent Evermore	26–30	2012
Daniel Littau	Paul Leopold	29–120	2012–2013
Mario Weiss	Professor T. Magellan	30–69,80,117–120	2012–2013
Sebastian Bender	Diederich von Burghart	38–120	2012–2013
Lucas Tavernier	Winston von Burghart	38–120	2012–2013
Laura Maria Heid	Danny	45-46	2012
Dana Cebulla	Pflegerin	47–63	2012
Stefan Sattler	Mister X	49–120	2012–2013
Ela Paul	Lilly Bode	49–56	2012
Brit Gülland	Frida Foster	49−53	2012
Sonja Bruns	Suzie Foster	50–53	2012
Mathilda Hadem	Stella	58–60	2012
Marcel Saibert	Ricardo	66–70	2012
Peter Clös	Mysteriöser Kutscher	70–71,74,119	2012–2013
Mira Herold	Caro Bode	75–120	2013–2014
Henning Kober	Jack Leopold III. (CIA)	81–95	2013
Maren Rossenberg	Petronella Pastel	85–104	2013
Nele Hannah Facklam	Debbie	87–90	2013
Hans Brand	Davy von Burghart	94–101	2013
Madlen Kaniuth	Helena	110−111	2013
Klaus Nierhoff	Leif Rasmussen (Xenon 35)	121−171	2014
Dominik Paul Weber	Simon	121−144	2014
Karel Vingerhoets	Geheimagent YB32	123−158	2014
Bernardus Marie Manders	Komplize	129−155	2014
Markus Klauk	Magnus Maeterlinck	135−146	2014
Siegfried W. Kernen	Herr Lepton / Richard Leopold	136, 166, 167, 172−176	2014
Aram van de Rest	Geheimagent YB12	158−176	2014
Manfred Böll	Albert Einstein	168−176	2014
Anderson Farah	Julia Caesar	168−176	2014
Dimi Tarantino	Ludwig XIV	168−176	2014
Armin Moeschler	Napoleon Bonaparte	168−176	2014
Susanne Richter	Elizabeth Leopold	169−176	2014
