= Ann Van den Broeck =

Belgian actress (born 1976)

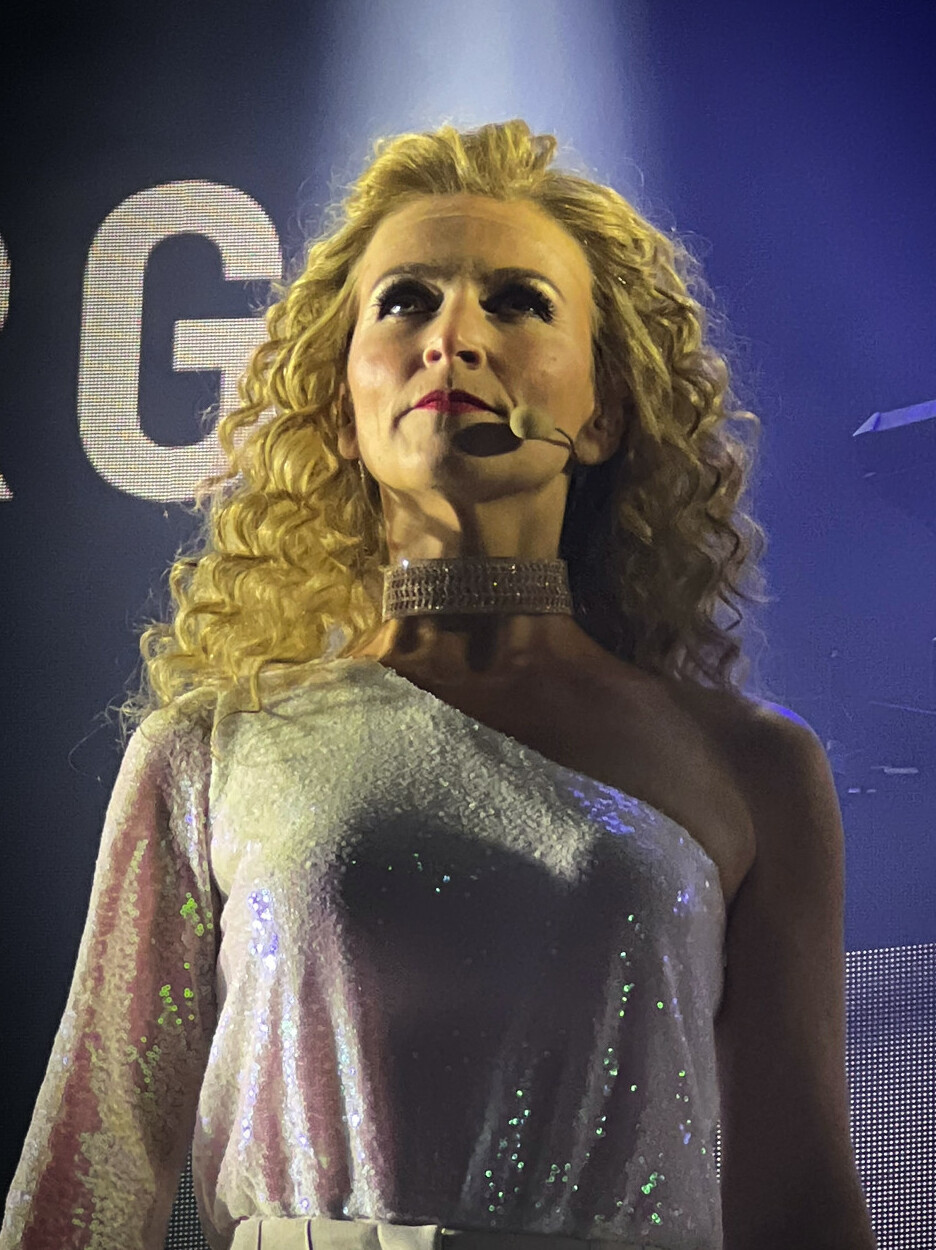
- Born: 1976 (age 49–50); Reet, Belgium

Ann Van den Broeck (born 1976) is a Flemish actress and musical star. She ended her studies in 2000 at the Koninklijk Conservatorium of Brussels in the musical department.

After her studies she played in The Hired Man, A Little Night Music, She Loves Me, Merrily We Roll Along, Dracula de Musical, Peter Pan, Into the Woods, Edith en Simone and Beauty and the Beast. She is also known for various roles in Belgian and Dutch television shows.

In 2004, she won a Flemish musical prize for her role in Merrily We Roll Along.

Currently, she is playing Sanne (Cathy) in the Flemish version of The Last Five Years with Jan Schepens as Nathan (Jamie) in the Fakkeltheater in Antwerp.

On March 22, 2009, she appeared in the title role of Elisabeth in the first ever Belgian production of the internationally acclaimed musical.

== Theater ==
Title	Role	Type	Producer	Year
The Hired Man	understudy May	musical	Koninklijk Ballet van Vlaanderen	2000
A Little Night Music	Mrs. Anderson	musical	Koninklijk Ballet van Vlaanderen	2001
Camelot	ensemble	musical	Music Hall	2002
Let's Do It	singer	musical	Koninklijk Ballet van Vlaanderen	2002
She Loves Me	alternate Amalia Balash	musical	Koninklijk Ballet van Vlaanderen	2002
Merrily We Roll Along	Beth Spencer	musical	Koninklijk Ballet van Vlaanderen	2004
Into the Woods	Cinderella	musical	Stichting Op Naar Het Bos	2004
Eenzaam zonder jou	Barbara	musical	De Zuiderkroon	2004
Dracula, de musical	Adriana / Lenka	musical	Music Hall	2005–2006
Peter Pan	Wendy	musical	Music Hall	2006
Edith en Simone	Edith	musical	De Zuiderkroon	2006
Beauty and the Beast	Belle	musical	Stage Entertainment	2007
Bakelietjes	Ann	music theater	own production	2008
Grease	Rizzo	musical	Music Hall en V&V Entertainment	2008
Assepoester	Assepoester	musical	Music Hall and V&V Entertainment	2008
The Last Five Years	Sanne De Vos	musical	Judas TheaterProducties	2008
Annie	Grace Farell	musical	Music Hall and V&V Entertainment	2008–2009
Elisabeth	Elisabeth	musical	Music Hall and V&V Entertainment	2009-

== Television ==
- Happy Singles
- Provincieshow
- Samson en Gert
- Spoed
- Zone Stad
- Witse
- Aspe
- Lili en Marleen
- Twee straten verder
- Thuis
- Café Majestic
- Familie

== Concerts ==
- Maxemillecorde: Musical Strings (2004–2005)
- Maxemillecorde: Movie Strings (2005)
- Maxemillecorde: Musical Strings (2006)
- Nieuwjaarsproms 2007 (2007)
- Voices @ Hoegaarden (2007)
- Maxemillecorde: More Musical Strings (2007)
- Nieuwjaarsproms 2008 (2008)

== Film ==
- Any way the wind blows - dancer (2003)

== Voice Acting (Flemish Dutch) ==
- Toy Story 2 - Jessie (1999)
- Scooby Doo 2: Monsters Unleashed - Velma (2004)
- Shrek 2 - Fairy Godmother (2004)
- Harry Potter and the Order of the Phoenix - walla (crowd, ghosts,...) (2007)
- The Golden Compass - Mrs. Coulter (2007)
- Enchanted - Giselle (2007)
- Toy Story 3 - Jessie (2010)
- Woezel & Pip - Narrator (2010)
- The Muppets - Mary (2011)
- Coco - Emcee (2017)
- Toy Story 4 - Jessie (2019)
- Tangled: The Series - Cassandra (2017 - 2020)
- Disenchanted - Giselle (2022)

== Cast recordings ==
- Flemish cast recording + DVD Dracula, de musical, 2005
- Flemish cast recording Beauty and the Beast, 2007

== Awards and nominations ==
- 2004: Vlaamse Musicalprijs for Merrily We Roll Along - won
- 2004: John Kraaijkamp Musical Awards for Merrily We Roll Along - nomination
- 2006: Vlaamse Musicalprijs for Dracula - nomination
- 2007: Vlaamse Musicalprijs for Edith en Simone - nomination
