= Jaak Boon =

Belgian television writer, film director and producer

Jaak Boon (born 1948 in Brussels) is a Belgian television writer, director and producer who specializes in the production of comedy.

Mainly a writer for Belgian television, Boon has written for a number of popular mainstream comedies in Belgium such as De Kotmadam since 1991 working with director Ronnie Commissaris. Boon co-wrote the series with Frans Ceusters.
