= Alice Toen =

Belgian actress (born 1924)

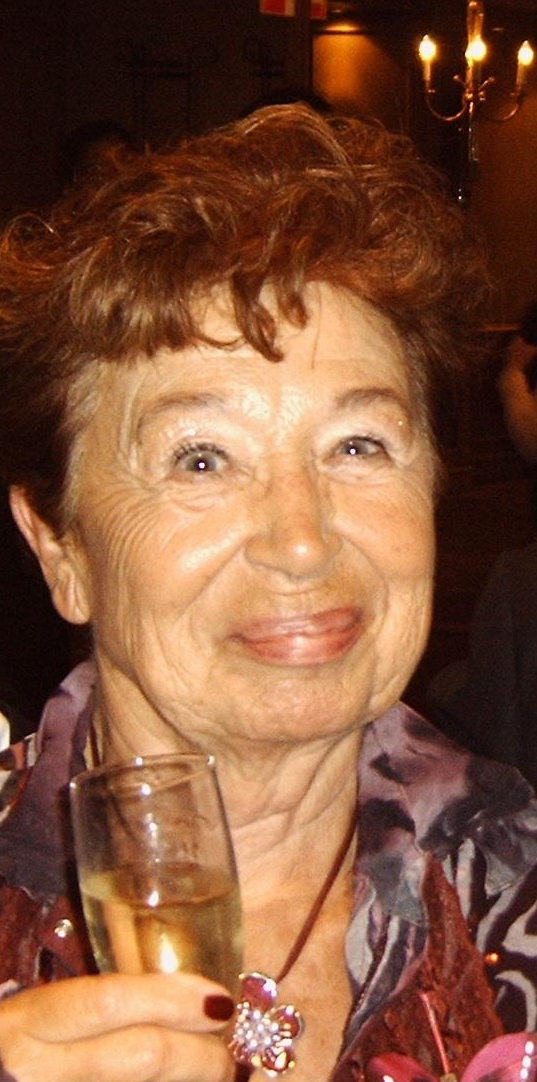
- Toen in 2004
- Born: Alice Edmonde Nelly Toen; 25 July 1924 (age 101); Hoboken, Antwerp, Belgium
- Other names: Alice Wenn
- Occupation: Actress
- Years active: 1958–present
- Spouse: Dries Wieme (died 1993)

Alice Edmonde Nelly Toen (born 25 July 1924) is a Belgian actress and singer.

== Life and career ==
She has been active since the 1950s, also as a dramaturge and author of youth theater, an author of children's and youth theatre. Alice Toen was one of the founders of the Mechels Miniatuur Teater, where she became director. Together with Dries Wieme she founded the group Jeugd en Teater, which played an important role in the youth theater of the 1970s.

She appeared in numerous films and TV Shows like: Albertine Solie in Familie, Jeanne in Lili & Marleen, Madeleine in Thuis, Dora in Amigo's and Ma in De Kotmadan. Toen was known for herself as an author and dramaturg for children's and youth theater in the 1950s. In April 2012, Toen received a supporting role in Nickelodeon 's daily soap Hotel 13, where she starred as Amalia Hennings from 2012 to 2013. Toen wrote Belgium songs in Eurovision Song Contest alongside Jo Leemans. She was married to Dries Wieme until his death in 1993.

Toen turned 100 on 25 July 2024.

== Filmography ==
- 1958: Het meisje en de madonna
- 1964: Captain Zeppos
- 1966: Warm aanbeloven
- 1968: Henry Tanger
- 1980: Hellegat
- 1991: De Kotmadam
- 1995: Ons Geluk
- 1999: Flikken
- 2000, 2004: Spoed
- 2001–2008, 2010: Familie
- 2001–2002: Droge voeding, kassa 4
- 2009: Twee straten verder
- 2010–2012: Thuis
- 2012: Quiz Me Quick
- 2012–2013: Hotel 13
- 2012: Hallo K3!
