= Daniel Lambo =

Belgian film director, film producer and screenwriter

Daniel Lambo (10 May 1968) is a Belgian film director, film producer and screenwriter.

== Biography ==
Lambo directed his first short film, dJU! in 2002. This black comedy won the Jury Prize and the Audience Award at the Leuven International Short Film Festival.

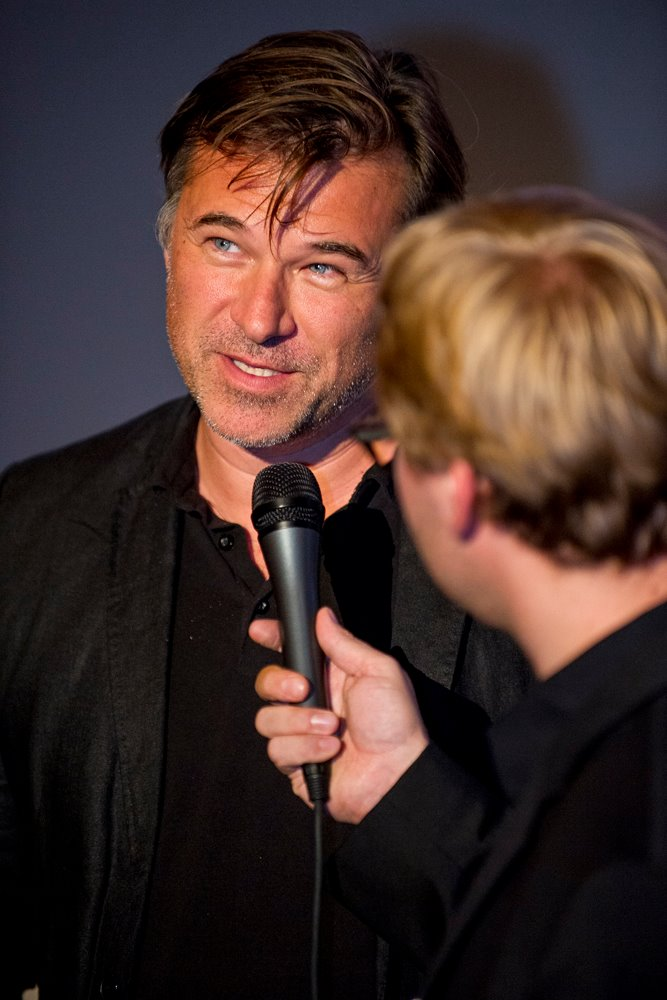
Daniel Lambo

A few years later he founded the production company Potemkino and produced a number of films, such as the award-winning Small Gods (2007).

Lambo's first feature film, Miss Homeless (2010), was written, produced, directed, filmed and edited entirely by himself. This docufiction about homeless people in Brussels premiered in twelve countries on the International Day for the Eradication of Poverty.

His production company Lambo Films emphasizes on socially relevant films. Dry Branches of Iran (2012) for instance deals with censorship during the Green Revolution in Iran. The first Belgian film shot on smart phones. His next film De Figurant (2016) takes on racial stereotypes with a story about a drug dealer that has acting ambitions. In the documentary Breathless Lambo investigates the delocalization of the asbestos industry to developing countries. On 13 September 2019 Breathless won the Ensor Award in the category best documentary film 2019 Cyclomax deals with air pollution. It is also the first Belgian webseries for kids. His latest film Stolen Life deals with international adoption fraude.

In addition to his own productions, Lambo remains active as a director and screenwriter for other projects. He co-created the TV series Duts (2010) and the comedy Los Flamencos (2013). He was the screenwriter for VTM-series "Crème de la crème" (2013), "Connie & Clyde" (2018) en "Glad Ijs" (2021). He was the co-writer of feature films "Clean" (2026) and "Everyone's Sorry Nowadays (2026)

== Filmography ==
- Dju! (kortfilm, 2002): screenwriter and director
- eLLektra (2004): screenwriter
- Gender (kortfilm, 2004): producer, screenwriter and director
- Nightshift (kortfilm, 2006): producer
- Kadogo (kortfilm, 2006): producer, screenwriter and director
- Of Cats & Women (kortfilm, 2007): producer
- Small Gods (2007): producer
- Tunnelrat (kortfilm, 2008): producer
- Samaritan (kortfilm, 2008): producer
- Brusilia (kortfilm, 2008): producer, screenwriter and director
- Vanessa Danse Encore (2009): producer
- Where Is Gary (2009): producer
- Miss Homeless (2010): producer, screenwriter and director
- Duts (TV-serie, 2010): co-director
- Dry Branches of Iran (2012): producer, screenwriter and director
- Crème de la crème (2013): screenwriter
- Traumland (2013): producer, screenwriter and director
- Los Flamencos (2013): screenwriter and director
- Booster (2014): producer, screenwriter and director
- De Figurant (2016): producer, screenwriter and director
- Connie & Clyde (2018): screenwriter
- Breathless (2018): producer, screenwriter and director
- Cyclomax (2019): producer, screenwriter and director
- Glad Ijs (2021): screenwriter
- Stolen Life (2024): producer, screenwriter and director
- Clean (2026): screenwriter
- Everyone's Sorry Nowadays (2026): screenwriter
