= Leo Madder =

Belgian actor

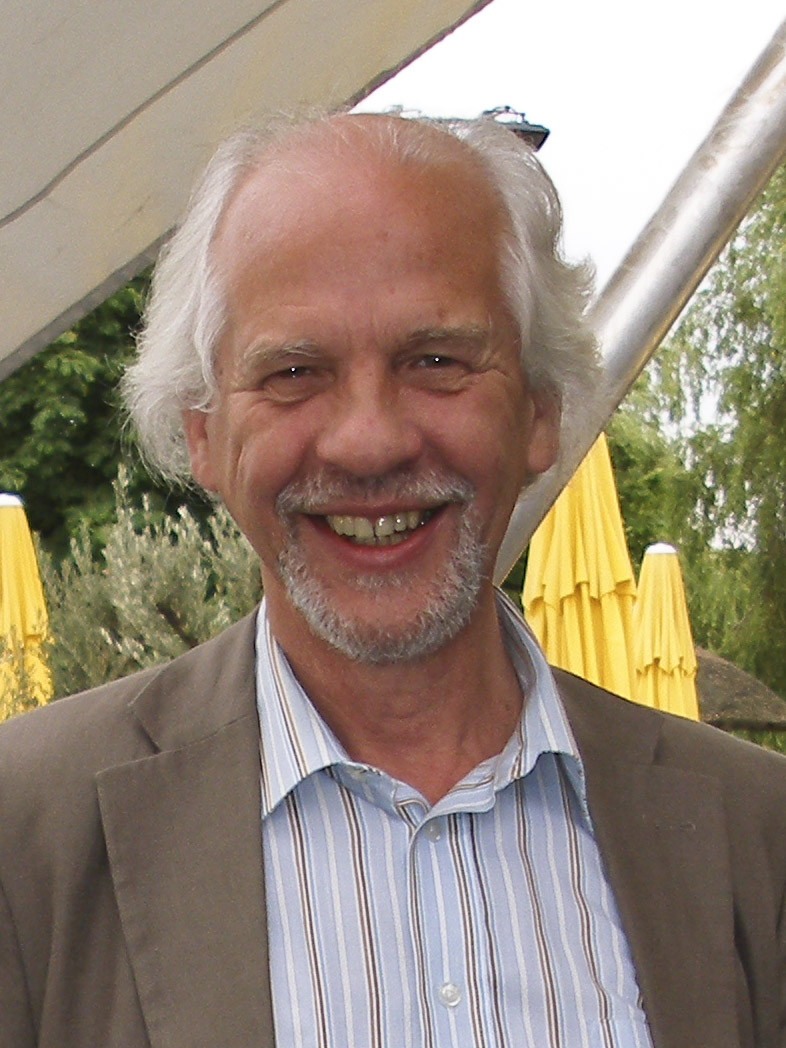
- Born: 18 July 1946 (age 78); Belgium
- Occupation: actor

Leo Madder (born 18 July 1946) is a Belgian television actor.

A familiar figure on Belgian television since the late 1960s he made his first appearance on TV in 1968 in Artikel 188. Starring in a number of television series in the 1970s, he had a brief stint at TV directing in 1980 with Freule Julie and 1981 with Familie Een. Following this the 1980s were a quite period in Madder's career until 1990 where he once again began appearing as an actor.

Madder portrayed of the main character in the Belgian Dutch language action drama series Spoed. He starred in 204 episodes between 2000 and 2007 alongside actress Arlette Sterckx.

Leo's son, actor Donald Madder, died in a road accident in 2001.

== See also ==
- Spoed
