= Grietje Vanderheijden =

Belgian actress (born 1978)

Grietje Vanderheijden (born October 1978) is a Belgian actress. She studied music at the conservatories of Brussels & Antwerp (Belgium). During and after her studies she appeared in multiple Belgian musicals such as "Cinderella", "The Wizard of Oz", "Sleeping Beauty", "Pinocchio", "Robin Hood" and "Peter Pan", in which she played the role of Tiger Lily and understudy for Wendy.

== Television ==
In 2003, Vanderheijden crossed over to television. Since she has been playing the role of "Vicky Muys", the girlfriend/wife of Rikki Dilliarkis (Steven De Lelie) in the Belgian TV series Lili & Marleen on vtm.

Vanderheijden has also played guestparts in Belgian TV series: Rupel, Flikken, Spoed and the teen series W817. She also landed one of the leading roles of the youth series En daarmee, Basta! on Ketnet, where she plays Isa De Riemacker. Isa is a teen with too much time on her hands, too many boyfriends and who needs a lot of parental advice, even though she's not always willing to take it.

Vanderheijden teaches theatre and drama at the conservatory in Mechelen.

== Theatre and music ==
Ever since she started her studies, Vanderheijden has been doing leading roles & protagonist parts in Belgian musicals. She also sings in the KETNET-band and the Kids Power Team, which is specifically aimed for children. During the summer of 2006 she has been on different stages throughout Belgium.

== Miscellaneous ==
In 2006, she also participated in the show "Steracteur, Sterartiest" on één, a show where 13 Belgian actors & actresses try to find out which one of them isn't only a good actor, but also a good singer. She entered on behalf of charity fund UNICEF. She managed to get to the second round.

== Filmography ==
- Lili & Marleen .... Vicky Muys
- En, Daarmee basta! .... Isa De Riemaecker
- Piet Piraat en de betoverde kroon .... Polyfonia
- Rupel .... Tanja Goeminne
- Flikken .... Karen
- Verschoten & zoon ... Michèle
- Spoed ...Roos
- Samson en Gert ... friend of Marlèneke
