= F.C. De Kampioenen (comic) =

- Main characters with the logo of the series
- Author: Hec Leemans
- Website: https://www.standaarduitgeverij.be/start/f-c-de-kampioenen/
- Current status/schedule: Running
- Launch date: 1997
- Publisher: Standaard Uitgeverij
- Genre: Comedy

F.C. De Kampioenen is a Belgian comic strip created by Hec Leemans since 1997 and published by Standaard Uitgeverij. The comics series is based on the television sitcom comedy series of the same name on Flemish television. The series ran for 94 albums with numerous special versions and editions.

== Setting ==
The comics follows the television show rather closely and replicates the atmosphere and the settings faithfully. Primarily, the comics exhibits a humorous and fun atmosphere. Premiering in 1997, the comics proved to be a great success propelling itself to be one of the top 5 best-selling comic strips in Flanders, together with The Adventures of Urbanus, Jommeke, Spike and Suzy, and De Kiekeboes. The comics ran from 1997 to 2011 with 94 albums published.

== Narrative ==
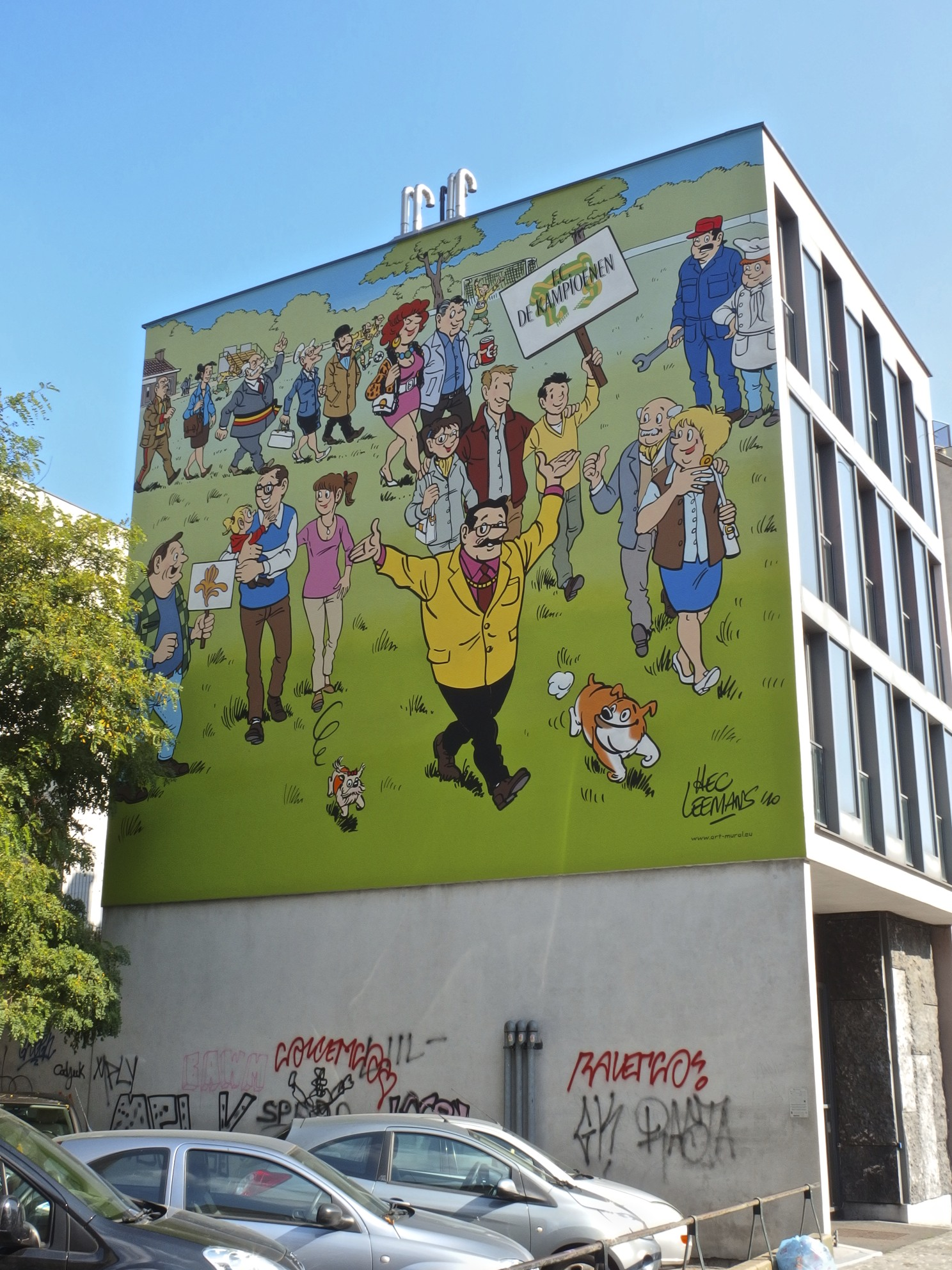
Strip wall of the comic strip based on the popular TV series, Vaartstraat 27, Brussels

The comic strip only follows the big story lines of the television series like new characters and the Marc Vertongen and Bieke Crucke wedding. Despite this, the albums run separately from the story line of the television show.

The first antagonist Dimitri De Tremmerie is a main character in albums 1 to 6. He will later reappear for guest performances.

Bernard Theofiel Waterslaeghers is the important antagonist in Album 7 to 16. Unlike the television series, he does not go away but re-appear for guest performances.

Eventually, Fernand Costermans becomes the from album 17 to the very end.

In December 2013, a comic book was published with the first championship film. Album 79 gives the story of the movie a different turn.

== Guest appearances ==
Characters have appeared in several comics.

1. De Kiekeboes - Main character
2. Triootje Kampioenen → Three already published albums together.
3. De Boma-Special! → Three previously released stories with Boma in the lead and additional games.
4. De Marcske-Special! → Three already published stories with Marcske in the lead.
5. De Xavier en Carmen-Special → Three already published stories with Xavier and / or Carmen in the lead.
6. Op zoek naar Neroke → Story of Carmen, Nero and Xavier (+ cd)
7. 10 jaar kampioenenstrips → Stickers, pictures, games, Fingerpopies of the Champions, and a story with the football matches from the comic strip (Title: The Struggle).
8. F.C. De Kampioenen Pretboek → Funbook with games, puzzles, magic tricks, recipes.
9. Championettes-special → Three already published albums with the women in the lead.

== Albums ==
=== Main Series ===
These are the main compilations/albums. The ones marked with the word CD are available in audio format.

1. Zal 't gaan, ja?
2. Mijn gedacht!
3. Buziness is buziness
4. Vliegende dagschotels
5. 't Is niet waar, hé?
6. De dubbele dino's
7. Kampioen zijn is plezant!
8. Kampioenen op verplaatsing
9. Tournee Zenerale
10. De ontsnapping van Sinterklaas
11. Xavier in de puree
12. Het sehks-schandaal
13. De kampioenen maken een film
14. Oma Boma
15. De huilende hooligan
16. Bij Sjoeke en Sjoeke
17. Het geval Pascale
18. De simpele duif
19. Supermarkske
20. Supermarkske slaat terug
21. Kampioenen aan zee
22. Boma in de coma
23. De dader heeft het gedaan
24. De wereldkampioenen
25. Sergeant Carmen
26. Het spiedende oog
27. Vertongen en zoon
28. Man, man, man!
29. Stem voor mij!
30. Gebakken lucht
31. Kampioenen op wielen
32. De zeep-serie
33. Kampioenen in Afrika
34. Supermarkske op de bres
35. Agent Vertongen
36. De trouwpartij
37. Kampioenen op latten
38. Buffalo Boma
39. De vliegende reporter
40. De groene zwaan
41. Xavier gaat vreemd
42. De lastige kampioentjes
43. Boma in de wellness
44. De antieke antiquair
45. Alle hens aan dek
46. Supermarkske op het slechte pad
47. De schat van de Macboma's
48. De Jobhopper
49. De Kampioenen in het circus
50. 50 Kaarsjes (CD)
51. Baby Vertongen
52. De nies van de neus
53. Don Padre Padrone
54. De rally van tante Eulalie
55. Paulientje op de dool (CD)
56. Miss Moeial
57. Carmen in het nieuw
58. Het geheim van de kampioentjes
59. De Afronaut
60. De erfenis van Maurice (CD)
61. De Kampioenen maken ambras
62. Oma Boma trainer
63. DDT doet weer mee
64. 20 jaar later
65. De Kampioenen in Pampanero (CD)
66. Kampioentjes verliefd
67. Supermarkske is weer fit
68. De pil van Pol
69. Vertongen Vampier
70. Fernand gaat Trouwen (CD)
71. De verdwenen Kampioenen
72. Xaverius De Grote
73. Komen vreten
74. Dolle Door
75. Hello poepa
76. De vinnige voetballer
77. Vijftig tinten paarsblauw
78. Dokter Jekyll en mister Vertongen
79. De Kampioenen van De filmset
80. De Kampioentjes en het spookkasteel
81. De Kampioenen in Rio
82. Boma op de klippen
83. Op zoek naar Neroke
84. Supermarkske bakt ze bruin
85. De Corsicaanse connectie
86. De Lottokampioen
87. DDT Op Het Witte Doek
88. De Geniale Djinn
89. Paniek in de Pussycat
90. De Kampioentjes Maken het Bont
91. De Malle Mascotte
92. De Pakjesoorlog (CD)
93. Supermarkske Is Weer Proper
94. De Tandartsassistente
95. Maurice de zwijger
96. Pol en Doortje gaan scheiden
97. Allemaal cinema!
98. Boma burgemeester
99. De nieuwe kolonel
100. Alles loopt in het honderd
101. De bucketlist van Xavier
102. Bibi Carmen
103. De kampioentjes en de kroonprins
104. Vrouwen aan de macht
105. Patatten en saucissen
106. De bronzen beker
107. Supermarkske en de 7 dwergen
108. De Kampioenen trappen door
109. De grimas van de paljas
110. De verjaardagstaart
111. Kampioenen aan het front
112. Boma in de val
113. Terug naar Splotsj
114. Ginette
115. Gespuis in huis
116. De knecht van tante Eulalie
117. De bal is rond
118. De strijd der titanen
119. De duckfacekampioenen
120. De snor in de nor
121. De prehistorische kampioenen
122. Aan zeer scherpe prijzen
123. Vreemde vogels en verse vis
124. Kevin de kat
125. Popol de losbol
126. Carmen stelt orde op zaken
127. De geheimzinnige dief
128. Supermarkske kraait victorie
129. Het hoofd van Titus
130. Xavier Rebelleert
131. De Kampioenen gaan kamperen
132. De zussen Boma
133. Jim van de gym
134. De championettes lossen het op
135. Op reis naar Parijs
136. Supermarkske de movie
137. De liefdesbrief
138. De jeugd van tegenwoordig

=== Special Versions ===
Some special albums have also been released:

1. Het geheim van de kousenband
2. Triootje Kampioenen
3. De Boma-Special!
4. De Markske-Special!
5. De Xavier en Carmen-Special
6. 10 Jaar Kampioenenstrips
7. F.C. De Kampioenen Pretboek
8. De Fernand-special
9. F.C. De Kampioenen Vriendenboek
10. De Championettes special
11. F.C. De Kampioenen Omnibus
12. F.C. De Kampioenen Knotsgek Puzzelboek
13. F.C. De Kampioenen op reis special
14. Op zoek naar Markske
15. Detective-Special
16. De superspecial
17. Boma presenteert: De tweede omnibus
18. Op zoek naar Carmen
19. De plezantste special
20. De Bibberspecial
21. De TV-special
22. Carmen presenteert: De derde omnibus
23. De Paulientje-special
24. Fernand presenteert: De vierde omnibus
25. 15 jaar Kampioenenstrips!
26. Paulientje presenteert: De vijfde omnibus
27. De Kampioentjes-special
28. F.C. De Kampioenen: De Filmspecial
29. F.C. De Kampioenen: De Wereldkampioenen Special
30. Knotsgek moppenboek
31. Het complete foute spelletjesboek van Mark Vertonien
32. Bieke presenteert: De zesde omnibus
33. F.C. De Kampioenen: Special Op glad ijs
34. Knotsgek zoekboek
35. 365 x pret
36. EK special
37. De maffia-special
38. 20 jaar Kampioenenstrips-special
39. WK-special
40. De oma Boma special
41. De love-special
42. De movie-special
43. De Supermarkske special
44. De EK-special 2021
45. De tante Eulalie-special
46. De dubbelgangers-special
47. 25 Jaar F.C. De Kampioenenstrips special
48. Tournée Zénéral special
49. De speurneuzen special

=== Special Editions ===
1. Zal 't gaan ja - 29 April 1999
2. De ontsnapping van Sinterklaas - 6 December 1999
3. Supermarkske - 9 June 2004
4. Supermarkske - 9 June 2004
5. Zal 't gaan ja - 13 November 2004
6. De zeep-serie - 25 January 2005
7. De dader heeft het gedaan - Gazet van Antwerpen 55 - 6 April 2005
8. De dader heeft het gedaan - 6 April 2005
9. De ontsnapping van Sinterklaas - 30 November 2005
10. Xavier in de puree - 10 January 2007
11. De huilende hooligan - 17 January 2007
12. Kampioenen aan zee - 24 January 2007
13. Sergeant Carmen - 31 January 2007
14. Het spiedende oog - 7 February 2007
15. Man, man, man ! - 14 February 2007
16. Gebakken Lucht - 21 February 2007
17. Kampioenen in Afrika - 28 February 2007
18. Agent Vertongen - 7 maart 2007
19. Buffalo Boma - 14 maart 2007
20. Kampioenen op wielen - 13 July 2010
21. Kampioenen aan zee - 20 July 2010
22. Kampioenen in Afrika - 27 July 2010
23. Baby Vertongen - 28 September 2010
24. Carmen in het nieuw - 5 October 2010
25. De nies van de neus - 12 October 2010
26. De erfenis van Maurice - 19 October 2010
27. Supermarkske op de bres - 31 October 2011
28. Man, man man! - 8 November 2011
29. Stem voor mij! - 15 November 2011
30. Sergeant Carmen - 22 November 2011
31. Zal 't gaan, ja? - 7 July 2012
32. Supermarkske slaat terug - 14 July 2012
33. Boma in de coma - 21 July 2012
34. Xavier gaat vreemd - 28 July 2012
35. Kampioenen in Afrika - 4 August 2012
36. De trouwpartij - 11 August 2012
37. De vliegende reporter - 18 August 2012
38. De Kampioenen in het circus - 25 August 2012
39. De Afronaut - 1 September 2012
40. Vertongen vampier - 8 September 2012
