= Sarah Thonig =

German actress (born 1992)

- Born: 16 February 1992 (age 33); Munich, Germany
- Occupation: Actress
- Years active: 2003–present
- Known for: Hotel 13
- Website: sarahthonig.de

Sarah Agrippine Thonig (born 16 February 1992) is a German film and theater actress.

== Biography ==
Born in Munich, Thonig first played in a school theater, then participated in amateur theater performances in the town theater of Dachau and attended various drama workshops. In the amateur field she worked in a theater project with handicapped people and appeared from 2008 to 2010 in various theater performances at the Ludwig-Thoma-Haus in Dachau. In the summer of 2011, she attended the Theater Summer Academy at the technical college Schauspiel München. In 2015 she took camera and acting lessons with the German actress Teresa Harder.

After Thonig received her Abitur certificat, she became for three years from 2011 to 2014 a member of the young ensemble of the Residenz Theatre in Munich, where she received speech and motion tuition as well as a dance and combat training. There she played two lead roles, the Ingrid in Rainer Werner Fassbinder's Katzelmacher and the Lou in DNA by Dennis Kelly. Thonig was also part of the Ensemble of Frühlingserwachen – Live almost, die young, a modern version of Spring Awakening, created after an adaption by the German author and director Nuran David Calis.

In 2003, at the age of eleven, Sarah Thonig started her acting career on camera and since 2012 she has appeared again in various television films and series. From 2015 Thonig played a permanent supporting role in the ZDF series Die Rosenheim-Cops. She plays Christin Lange, one of the two receptists at the Rosenheim police department, alongside Ursula Maria Burkhart who plays the role of her colleague Marianne Grasegger.

In her spare time Thonig is active as a cheerleader.

== Filmography ==
=== TV series ===
- Salzburger Land (2014)
- Heiraten macht mich nervös (2005)
- Dahoam is Dahoam (2012)
- Lebenslänglich Mord (2012, episode Die kleine Königin)
- Hotel 13 (2014, serial, 49 episodes – main character Liv Sonntag)
- Aktenzeichen XY… ungelöst (2014)
- Alles was zählt (2014, serial, guest part as Susi Carstens)
- Sturm der Liebe (2015, serial, guest part as Becky McPherson)
- Der Alte 2015, episode Die Puppenspieler)
- Die Rosenheim-Cops (since 2015, series)
- Wilsberg (2017, serial, guest part in Die fünfte Gewalt)

== Theater appearances ==
- Katzelmacher (2012, director Anja Sczilinski, Residenztheater München)
- DNA (2013, director Anja Sczilinski, Residenztheater München)
- Frühlingserwachen – Live fast, die young (2014, director Anja Sczilinski, Residenztheater München)
