= Katrien Devos =

American soil scientist

- Education: Ghent University
- Scientific career
- Workplaces: John Innes Centre; University of Georgia
- Website: http://research.franklin.uga.edu/devoslab/

Katrien M. Devos is an American plant geneticist who is distinguished research professor at the University of Georgia. Her research considers the structure, function and evolution of the genomes of grasses. In particular, Devos considers halophytic turfgrasses, cereals and bioenergy crops. She was elected Fellow of the American Association for the Advancement of Science in 2016.

== Early life and education ==
Devos became interested in plant genetics during her undergraduate studies. She was a doctoral researcher at Ghent University, where she studied wheat and Triticeae genetic mapping. She moved to the United Kingdom as a postdoctoral researcher, where she used comparative genetics to better understand cereals. In the United Kingdom, she worked in John Innes Centre where she created the concept of crop circles, which considers the relationship between grass genomes.

== Research and career ==
In 1996 Devos was awarded a Biotechnology and Biological Sciences Research Council David Phillips Fellowship to start her independent scientific career, where she started working on genome evolution. Devos worked with the International Crops Research Institute for the Semi-Arid Tropics to create a millet cultivar for food crops in the developing world. These millet crops were bred to have improved resistance to downy mildew.

Devos moved to the University of Georgia in 2003, where has focused on understanding the genetics of grasses. These investigations have included target crops such as wheat, panicum virgatum foxtail millet, eleusine coracana. By sequencing the genome of pearl millet, Devos was able to identify a dwarfing gene, the first gene that causes an agronomic trait that was ever isolated.

== Awards and honors ==
- 2016 Elected Fellow of the American Association for the Advancement of Science
- 2017 University of Georgia Research Foundation's Creative Research Medal
- 2017 D.W. Brooks Award for Excellence in Research
- 2018 CSIRO Distinguished Visiting Scientist Fellowship
- 2019 Elected Fellow of the Crop Science Society of America

== Selected publications ==
- Jinrong Peng; Donald E. Richards; Nigel M. Hartley; et al. (1 July 1999). "'Green revolution' genes encode mutant gibberellin response modulators". Nature. 400 (6741): 256–261. doi:10.1038/22307. ISSN 1476-4687. PMID 10421366. Wikidata Q33869122.
- M D Gale; K M Devos (3 March 1998). "Comparative genetics in the grasses". Proceedings of the National Academy of Sciences of the United States of America. 95 (5): 1971–4. Bibcode:1998PNAS...95.1971G. doi:10.1073/pnas.95.5.1971. ISSN 0027-8424. PMC 33824. PMID 9482816. Wikidata Q24599160.
- Katrien M Devos; James K M Brown; Jeffrey L Bennetzen (1 July 2002). "Genome size reduction through illegitimate recombination counteracts genome expansion in Arabidopsis". Genome Research. 12 (7): 1075–1079. doi:10.1101/gr.132102. ISSN 1549-5469. PMC 186626. PMID 12097344. Wikidata Q39860924.
