= Frans Ceusters =

Flemish television writer

Frans Ceusters is a Flemish television writer.

Mainly a writer for Belgian television, Ceusters is probably best known for his writing of De Kotmadam since 1991 wit working co-writer Jaak Boon. and with director Ronnie Commissaris. Since 1998, Ceusters has written the script for Alle maten.
