= Jan Van Der Veken =

Belgian illustrator

Jan Van Der Veken (born 10 April 1975) is a Belgian illustrator. Born in Ghent, he studied graphic design and typography at the Sint-Lucas School of Architecture in Ghent, where he studied under Ever Meulen (Eddy Vermeulen) and other instructors.

Van Der Veken developed his own artistic style, inspired by the atoomstijl (Atomic style), a 1980s "relaunch" of the Ligne claire. He launched his own design company, Fabrica Grafica.

Van Der Veken specializes in book covers and posters, but also creates illustrations for various newspapers and magazines. He illustrated the covers for the 7 December 2009 and 11 January 2010 issues of The New Yorker.
