= Daniel Littau =

German actor

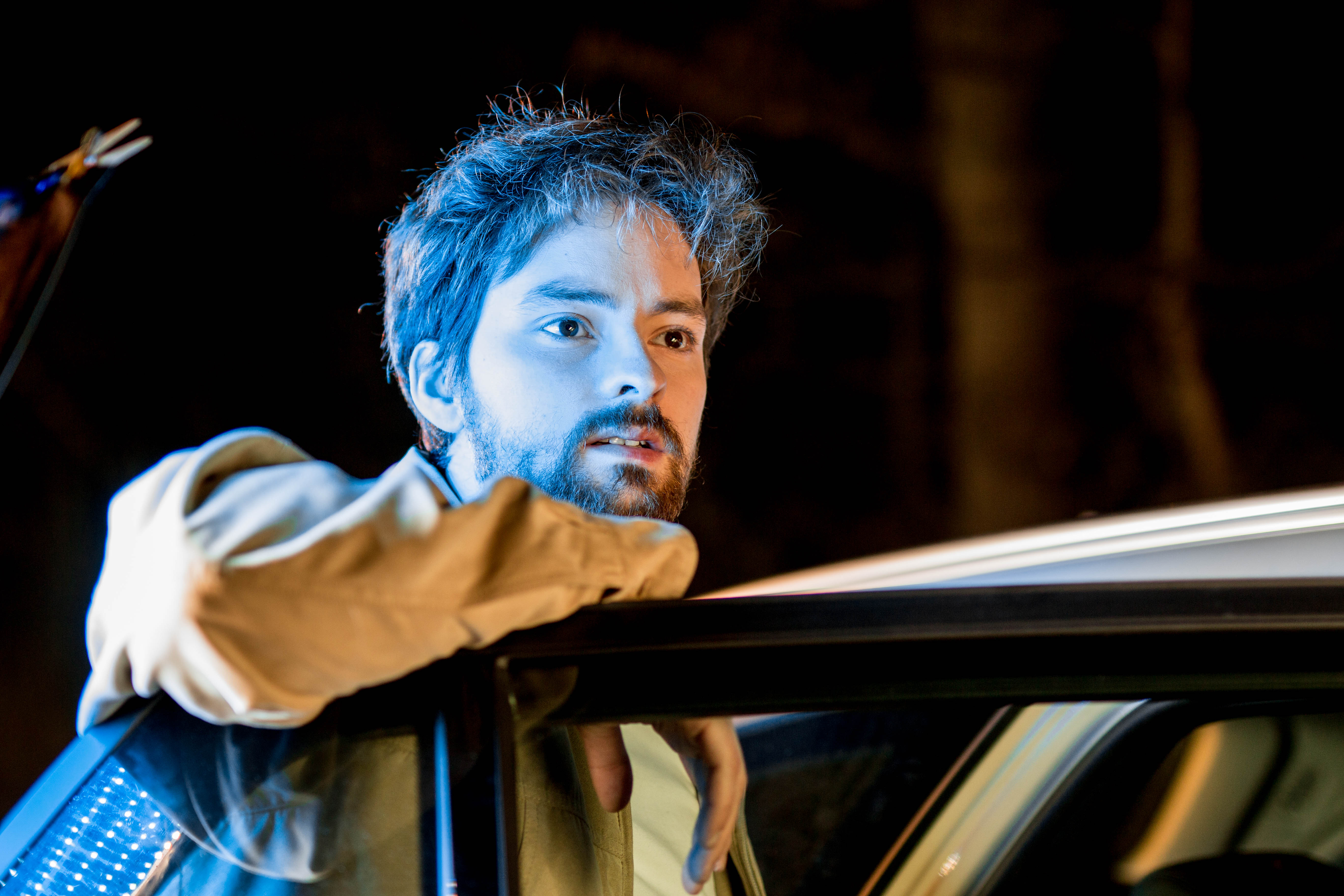
- Daniel Littau
- Born: 12 April 1991; Espelkamp, Germany
- Occupation: Actor
- Years active: 2009–present

Daniel Littau (Espelkamp, 12 April 1991) is a German actor.

Since 2012 he is known for his role as "Paul Leopold" in the Nickelodeon – Studio 100 television series Hotel 13. Previously, he also played a small role in 2007 in the television series Der Lehrer and in 2009 in Das Haus Anubis.

In his residence at Espelkamp he is involved in a short film production team called Camcore, where he is involved in several short films, resulting in several nominations and awards.
