= De Kotmadam =

Flemish comedy TV series (1991 - 2024)

- De Kotmadam series poster
- Created by: Frans Ceusters
- Starring: Katrien Devos; Mark Verstraete; Odilon Mortier; Din Meysmans
- Theme music composer: Robert Vlaeyen
- Country of origin: Belgium
- Original language: Dutch
- No. of seasons: 25
- No. of episodes: 352

Production
- Running time: 25 to 35 min.
- Production company: R.V. Productions

Original release
- Network: VTM
- Release: 30 December 1991 – 28 December 2024

De Kotmadam is a classic Flemish comedy television series directed by Ronnie Commissaris and Wim Feyearts produced for Belgian television since 1991. The series is written by Jaak Boon and Frans Ceusters. Season 25, which was also the last, was aired in 2024.

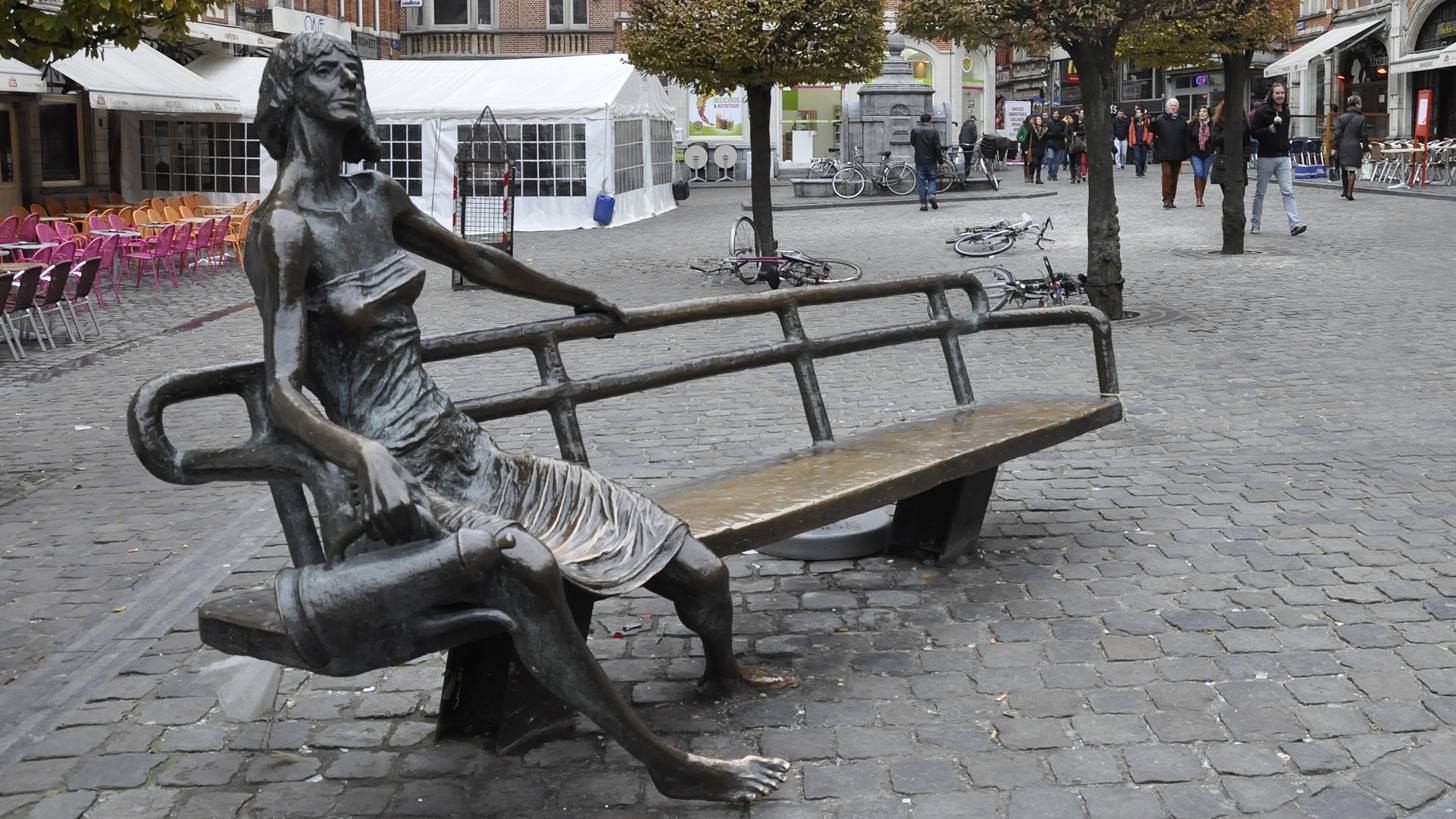
Statue shown in the series intro

The series revolves around Jeanne Piens (Katrien Devos), who owns a small sweet shop in the centre of Leuven and rents out several rooms of her house to students studying in the city. She is a caring type and loves all her students. Her husband Jef Liefooghe (Mark Verstraete) works for the city's gardening department. Their friend Odilon Bonheur (Odilon Mortier), a naïve warden in the local prison, visits regularly to give or seek help.

Odillon Mortier decided not to perform in season 21 for health reasons and died suddenly on 13 August 2012. Heman Verbruggen got a new supporting role: Gijs, a clumsy colleague of Jef.

== Fictional biography ==
=== Jeanne ===
Jeanne mostly wears old fashioned floral dresses and pretends to be better than she is and brags frequently. If one of her customers goes on a vacation abroad or is going to ride the horses, she wants to do similar things. Her attempts mostly fail, but eventually, she wins (or at least thinks she has the upper hand) as she forges evidence. During her trip to Spain, she just hid in her own house and went to a solarium. In another example Mimi was on television getting flowers from her grandchild in some "Thank you"-program. A jealous Jeanne also wanted to receive flowers. As the students were too busy, she just pretended to be an 18-year student, called Mieke, who wants to thank Jeanne as being the best landlady in town. Mieke was selected by the producers, but things got complicated when the producer wanted Mieke and Jeanne in the same scene. Furthermore, Jeanne exaggerates and misinterprets things. She once followed a course Chinese when one of her students was dating the daughter of the Chinese ambassador. It turned out the father ran a restaurant with a similar name. In another episode, Jeanne wanted to have a liposuction but due to some miscommunication, she got a piercing in her belly. In another episode she pretended to be a talented piano player - specialized in Sergei Rachmaninoff-compositions - so she got an invitation to perform at the opening of an art exhibition. By coincidence, she was bitten by a ferret. She then had a reason to cancel the performance.

=== Jef ===
Jef is lazy. He hates working. All small jobs are delayed. He can always persuade others (especially Odillon) to do the task. Jef likes fishing and three-cushion billiards. He wants to be in the committee of both, in which he does not succeed. Despite he hates his job as city's gardener, he loves his own greenhouse where he cultivates some rare plants and flowers. Jef frequently takes a day off or calls his boss pretending to be sick. In such cases, he sneakily goes fishing telling Jeanne he is going to work. Although his lies work initially, Jeanne always retrieves the truth. Jef does not like his mother-in-law and vice versa. Jef mostly wears a white shirt, pants with suspenders and a small back brace. Similar as Jeanne, he forges evidence: he once won the national championship fishing, but he tricked the committee by putting a big zander on the hook. At some other fish competition, he put fish in his living some hours before. In another example he did not have enough saving money to go on a fishing trip so he set up a fake charity event and sold waffles for "a friend who suffers cancer". He also "earned" money by selling Jeanne "anti-aging pills" and used it for buying a camper.

=== Odillon ===
Odillon is not that smart, but he is rather handy. He is well befriended with Jef and both like fishing and playing three-cushion billiards. He likes to fix the small jobs Jef delays. Jef always makes something up to sneak away and tells Odillon what he is going to do and what he will tell Jeanne. Odillon can't lie, so eventually he always spills the real story to Jeanne. Odillon is frequently asked by the students to help them, but it is always for their own purposes. Odillon does not realize he is being abused. Odillon was last seen in last episode of season 20 (episode 294).

=== Students ===
Most of the stories in the show revolve around the antics of the four students (there were 5 students until season 16). Because students can't realistically keep studying for more than a couple of years, there is high character turnover among the students. There is, however, some consistency in the stereotypicality of the characters. The last name of some characters was never revealed:

- The hard-working, arrogant, know-it-all (M/F): Charles-Victor Blomme, Ria Vranckx, Gentil Aelvoet, Filip, Victor Kindermans
- The fun-loving social type (M): Billy, Jo Van Der Gucht, Dieter, Hugo, Lukas, Stef, Lukas (There were two different students with a name Lukas)
- The shy insecure type (M): Koen Maertens, Bas, Arnold
- The secure, responsible type (F): Sam De Taeye, Pim Davignon, Lus Hazevoets, Brigitte Ghoetseels, Saskia Moeremans, Paulien Billen, Martha
- The fashionable outgoing boy-magnet (F): Betty Billen, Veronique, Tineke Creemers, Lies, Jill Verhaest, Ines

=== Customers ===
The sweet shop had one regular client: Bertje (Din Meysmans), a mischievous but well-meaning neighbourhood boy during the first four series. He was part of the main cast. As from season five, he was replaced by some other children, such as Jelle Cleymans, but none of them were considered to be in the main cast anymore.

Another important customer was Madame Hulpiau (Rita Smets) (season 3–14). Furthermore, Mimi (Machteld Ramout), a middle-aged woman who loves gossiping and is Jeanne's best friend, visits the shop regularly (season 4 – 25).

Other customers are Jeanne's previous colleagues. Jeanne was a cashier in a supermarket before she became manager of her own shop. She now looks down at her former colleagues and considers them as part of the lower class.

== Locations ==
Filming is done in a limited set of locations:

- the living room which is in the same room as the dinner and kitchen
- the 5 bedrooms of the students. As from season 16 there were only 4 student rooms. The room in the attic became a common recreation room for the students.
- the bedroom of Jef and Jeanne
- the sweet shop
- the common bathroom
- the entrance corridor of the private parts
- the veranda, where Jef cultivates his plants, and a small garden behind
- some scenes are filmed on the stairs or in front of the building
- in last season there are a few shots taken inside a recreational vehicle

In rare situations other locations are used. In one episode Jeanne was selected to act in the Flemish version of Idols. In another episode, Jef was a participant in the Flemish variant of Wheel of Fortune.

== Trivia ==
- De Kotmadam is the longest-running Belgian sitcom in terms of episodes and seasons. FC De Kampioenen ended after 273 episodes and 21 seasons. De Kotmadam already had 274 episodes during mid-season 19. In terms of audience measurement, F.C. De Kampioenen breaks all records with an average of 1.2 million viewers, De Kotmadam at its peak in the 1990s had an average of 1.7 million viewers, the average of last seasons is 650.000.
- Herman Verbruggen played the role of Marc Vertonghen in F.C. De Kampioenen as a clumsy, naive man. After last show stopped, he got the role of Gijs in De Kotmadam, also a clumsy, naive man.
- A running gag in the series is that some supporting actors play multiple roles even inside seasons. Same characters are also played by different actors, especially colleagues of Jef.
- The series has lots of logical errors and contradictions. In season 13 Jef and Jeanne are married for 25 years. In season 24 they are married 30 years. In an episode in season 18 Jeanne clearly knows what a transgender person is, in season 24 she asks explanation at one of her students. In some episodes Jef and Jeanne have (basic) knowledge of English language, in other episodes they do not understand English at all. Odilon's last name was revealed in season 1 episode 14 where Jef addressed him as Odilon Michiels. As from season 3 episode 8 his last name is Bonheur.
- In the first 24 seasons there is no real overall storyline. Except the first two episodes, all others have their own main story which is not picked afterwards. The final seasons has at least three overlapping storylines: the romance between Jeanne's mother and Ward, the robbery of the safe deposit box which caused a hole in the ceiling and thus insurance fraud must be committed, the vacation plans of Jef and Jeanne which eventually leads to the closure of the dormitories and the sweet shop.

== Main characters ==
Actor	Character	SEASON																								
		1	2	3	4	5	6	7	8	9	10	11	12	13	14	15	16	17	18	19	20	21	22	23	24	25
Katrien Devos	Jeanne Liefooghe-Piens	M	M	M	M	M	M	M	M	M	M	M	M	M	M	M	M	M	M	M	M	M	M	M	M	M
Mark Verstraete	Jef Liefooghe	M	M	M	M	M	M	M	M	M	M	M	M	M	M	M	M	M	M	M	M	M	M	M	M	M
Odilon Mortier	Odilon Bonheur	M	M	M	M	M	M	M	M	M	M	M	M	M	M	M	M	M	M	M	M					
Din Meysmans	Bertje	M	M	M	M	M	M																			
Tom Van Landuyt	Billy	M	M																							
Pieter-Jan De Smet	Charles-Victor Blomme	M	M	M																						
Aron Wade	Koen Maertens	M	M	M	M	M	M																			
Anne Denolf	Samantha 'Sam' De Taeye	M	M	M	M	M	M																			S
Christel Van Schoonwinkel	Betty Billen	M	M	M	M	M	M	M											S						S	
Geert Hunaerts	Jo Van Der Gucht			M	M	M	M	M																		
Britt Van Der Borght	Ria Vranckx				M	M	M	M													S					
Tine Van den Brande	Véronique				M	M																				
Danaë Van Oeteren	Pim Davignon						M																			
Nicoline Dossche	Lus Haezevoets							M	M	M	M															
Steve Geerts	Dieter							M	M	M	M															
Pepijn Caudron	Gentil Aelvoet								M	M	M															S
Esther Leenders	Tineke Creemers								M	M	M	M	M													
Bert Van Poucke	Hugo Van Kompernolle						1	M	M	M	M	M	M													S
Fabrice Delecluse	Lukas							M	M	M	M	M	M													
Margot Brabants	Brigitte Ghoetseels							2			M	M	M	M												
Marianne Devriese	Lies												M	M	M	M										
Han Coucke	Stef												M	M	M	M					S					
Mout Uyttersprot	Filip de Faucille											M	M	M	M	M							S			
Louis van der Waal	Bas													M												
Mieke Dobbels	Saskia Moerman														M	M	M	M								
Jan Van Hecke	Arnold De Meyer				3										M	M	M	M								
Ayesha Künzle	Jill Verhaest																M	M	M	M	M					
Frederik Huys	Victor Kindermans																M	M	M	M	M	M	M	M	M	M
Sarah Van Overwaelle	Paulien Billen																		M	M	M		S			
Stoffel Bollu	Lukas																	M	M	M	M	M	M		S	
Anouck Luyten	Ines Van Nothegom																					M	M	M	M	M
Helle Vanderheyden	Martha																					M	M	M	M	M
Arno Moens	Simon																								M	M

=== Legend ===
- M = Main cast, actor/character is in the opening credits
- S = Supporting cast, actor/character is not in the opening credits
- Number= alternative role
  - 1: neighbour boy of Ria Vranckx
  - 2: Daisy, a friend of Lus
  - 3: Eric, a polka-dancing instructor

== Supporting characters ==
This list is not complete.

		SEASON																								
Actor	Character	1	2	3	4	5	6	7	8	9	10	11	12	13	14	15	16	17	18	19	20	21	22	23	24	25
Rita Smets	Ms. Hulpiau		x	x	x	x	x	x	x	x	x	x	x	x	x	x										
Bram Van Driessche	Yvan				x	x																				
Jelle Cleymans	Pieter		x				x	x	x																	
Machteld Ramoudt	Mimi Dockx-Seghaert		x			x	x	x	x	x	x	x	x	x	x	x	x	x	x	x	x	x	x	x	x	x
Fred Van Kuyk	Gerard					x	x	x	x					x												
Fred Van Kuyk	Staf														x							x	x			
Fred Van Kuyk	Ward																									x
Fred Van Kuyk	unnamed																								x	
Jos Van Gorp	Jos							x			x								x							
Jos Van Gorp	Flor															x										
Gerd De Ley	unnamed							x																		
Gerd De Ley	Jos Dockx										x	x				x			x			x		x		
Gunter Reniers	unnamed						x																			
Gunter Reniers	Evert											x	x	x												
Gunter Reniers	Tuur																		x	x	x	x	x	x	x	
Felix Peeters	Bas												x													
Felix Peeters	Vic													x	x											
Sjarel Branckaerts	unnamed			x		x																				
Sjarel Branckaerts	Robert												x													
Sjarel Branckaerts	Fernand													x												
Sjarel Branckaerts	Gerard													x	x											
Sjarel Branckaerts	Marcel																x									
Serge Adriaensen	Sander															x										
Serge Adriaensen	Gust																	x								
Serge Adriaensen	Rudi																		x							
Serge Adriaensen	Pol																		x							
Serge Adriaensen	Tuur																			x	x					
Ron Cornet	Marcel				x																					
Ron Cornet	Gilbert																	x								
Ron Cornet	unnamed																				x					
Ron Cornet	Flor																					x	x	x	x	x
Herman Verbruggen	Gijs																					x	x		x	
Ivan Pecnik	Alfie								x																	
Ivan Pecnik	Roger																					x				
Ivan Pecnik	Johny																						x			
Alice Toen	unnamed	x																								
Alice Toen	Mother of Jeanne																								x	x
