= Spoed =

Belgian television drama series

- DVD cover of season 2
- Genre: Medical drama
- Developed by: Ward Hulselmans
- Written by: G. D'Hena, Hola Guapa
- Directed by: Johan Thiels, Guy Thys
- Creative directors: Frank Tulkens, Johan Thiels
- Starring: Leo Madder; Arlette Sterckx; Ann Van den Broeck
- Composers: Tess Goossens, Chain Gang, Paul Vermeulen, Miguel Moerman
- Country of origin: Belgium
- Original language: Dutch
- No. of seasons: 11
- No. of episodes: 217

Production
- Producer: Herman Verbaet
- Running time: 40–53 minutes
- Production company: Studio-A

Original release
- Network: VTM
- Release: 2000 – 2008

Spoed (Dutch: Emergency) was a Belgian hospital drama TV series produced in the Dutch language in Belgium between 2000 and 2008. The series was broadcast on both Flemish/Belgian and Dutch TV. The series is directed by Johan Thiels and Guy Thys. It produced 217 episodes across 11 seasons.

It may be compared to the American TV programs ER or Chicago Hope.

== Main cast ==
- Leo Madder as Luc Gijsbrecht (204 episodes, 2000–2007)
- Kurt Rogiers as Filip Driessen
- Ann Van den Broeck as Iris van de Vijver
- Magda Cnudde as Bea Goossens
- Sven de Ridder as Steven Hofkens
- Arlette Sterckx as Lies Weemaes (191 episodes, 2000–2006)
- Gert Lahousse as Bob Verly (114 episodes, 2000–2006)
- Peggy De Landtsheer as Marijke Willems (64 episodes, 2000–2006)

Actress Grietje Vanderheijden has also made an appearance in the series.
