= F.C. De Kampioenen =

Belgian sitcom

- Series poster with the main characters
- Genre: Sitcom
- Created by: Luc Beerten; Willy Vanduren; Bruno Raes
- Written by: Bart cooreman (also the 4 movies); René Swartenbroekx; Knarf Van Pellecom; Anton Klee; Frank Van Laecke; Wout Thielemans (pseudonym Simon Pieters); Koen Vermeiren; Jan Schuermans; An Swartenbroekx (also the 4 movies); Rudy Morren; Peter Cnop; Luc Kerkhofs; Gerrie Van Rompaey (pseudonym Eva Lambert); Jan Bergmans; Carmino D'haene; Mieke Verbelen; Willy Van Poucke; Eddy Asselbergs (pseudonym Collectief Foks); Geert Bouckaert; Nico De Braeckeleer; Marc Scheers; Dirk Nielandt; Pastapoora (Ann Ricour, Ivo Chiang, Anne-Mie Leroy & Luc Standaert); Johan Gevers (the 4 movies); Hec Leemans (movie 1 & 2); Steve De Wilde (movie 3 & 4); Bart Vaessen (movie 3 & 4)
- Directed by: Willy Vanduren; Eric Taelman; Dirk Corthout; Stef Desmyter; Etienne Vervoort; Anne Ingelbrecht; Louis Welters; Johan Gevers; Ivo Chiang (also TV special); Eric Wirix (movie 1); Jan Verheyen (movie 2, 3 & 4)
- Starring: Marijn Devalck; Danni Heylen; Tuur De Weert; Carry Goossens; Johny Voners; Loes Van den Heuvel; Ann Tuts; Ben Rottiers; Walter Michiels; An Swartenbroekx; Herman Verbruggen; Jacques Vermeire; Jakob Beks; Jaak Van Assche; Machteld Timmermans (only in the movies and TV special); Niels Destadsbader (only in the movies and TV special)
- Opening theme: De Kampioenen
- Composers: Guido Van Hellemont (1990-2000); Raf Van Assche (2000-2011)
- Country of origin: Belgium
- Original language: Dutch
- No. of seasons: 21
- No. of episodes: 273 and 1 special

Production
- Producers: Bruno Raes (1990-2002); Marc Scheers (1998-2004); Rik Stallaerts (2004-2011)
- Running time: 30 to 45 minutes

Original release
- Network: VRT 1 (VRT)
- Release: 6 October 1990 – 25 December 2020 (26 February 2011 last episode)

F.C. De Kampioenen ('F.C. The Champions') is a long-running Flemish sitcom chronicling the (mis)adventures of a fictional local football team. It originally aired on the Belgian-Flemish channel TV1 (now Eén) between 1990 and 2011, for 21 seasons with 273 half-hour-long episodes, making it one of the most successful comedy programs ever on Belgian television.

The series relies heavily on stereotypical characters and farce for its humour. The story is mainly set around a few male members of a local soccer club and their wives who regularly visit the club canteen before or after a training or match. Next to the field is another commercial property, owned by a hostile neighbour. Most of the episodes are based on misunderstandings or dirty tricks from these neighbours.

The series has had various directors, with Etienne Vervoort, Stef Desmyter, Johan Gevers, Willy Vanduren, and Eric Taelman having the biggest episode count, respectively. The most active writers have been Bart Cooreman, René Swartenbroekx, Knarf Van Pellecom, Anton Klee, and Frank Van Laecke.

Seasons 1–21 have all been released on DVD through Universal Pictures and Lime-Lights.

After the television series ended, 4 theatrical movies were released between 2013 and 2019. An 8 episode limited series return was planned for 2021, but the project was halted after the death of main cast member Johny Voners. Instead, a one-off 90-minute episode was filmed and released on December 25, 2020.

The popular celebrity comic album series, F.C. De Kampioenen still runs to this day.

== Cast ==
=== Overview ===
Character	Portrayed by	Seasons																					2020 TV Special
Character	Portrayed by	1	2	3	4	5	6	7	8	9	10	11	12	13	14	15	16	17	18	19	20	21	2020 TV Special
Balthasar Boma	Marijn Devalck	Main	Main	Main	Main	Main	Main	Main	Main	Main	Main	Main	Main	Main	Main	Main	Main	Main	Main	Main	Main	Main	Starring
Pascale De Backer	Danni Heylen	Main	Main	Main	Main	Main	Main	Main	Main	Main	Main	Main	Main	Main	Main	Main	Main	Main	Main	Main	Main	Main	Starring
Oscar Crucke	Carry Goossens	Main	Main	Main	Main																		Archive Footage
Bieke Crucke	An Swartenbroeckx	Main	Main	Main	Main	Main	Main	Main	Main	Main	Main	Main	Main	Main	Main	Main	Main	Main	Main	Main	Main	Main	Starring
† Xavier Waterslaeghers	Johny Voners	Main	Main	Main	Main	Main	Main	Main	Main	Main	Main	Main	Main	Main	Main	Main	Main	Main	Main	Main	Main	Main	Archive Footage
Carmen Vandormael	Loes Van den Heuvel	Main	Main	Main	Main	Main	Main	Main	Main	Main	Main	Main	Main	Main	Main	Main	Main	Main	Main	Main	Main	Main	Starring
† Pico Coppens	Walter Michiels	Main	Main	Main	Main																		Archive Footage
Doortje Van Hoeck	Ann Tuts	Main	Main	Main	Main	Main	Main	Main	Main	Main	Main	Main	Main	Main	Main	Main	Main	Main	Main	Main	Main	Main	Starring
Dimitri De Tremmerie	Jacques Vermeire	Main	Main	Main	Main	Main	Main	Main	Main												Guest		Starring
Marc Vertongen	Herman Verbruggen	Recurring		Guest	Recurring	Main	Main	Main	Main	Main	Main	Main	Main	Main	Main	Main	Main	Main	Main	Main	Main	Main	Starring
Pol De Tremmerie	Ben Rottiers					Main	Main	Main	Main	Main	Main	Main	Main	Main	Main	Main	Main	Main	Main	Main	Main	Main	Starring
Bernard T. Waterslaeghers	Jakob Beks									Main	Main												Archive Footage
Fernand Costermans	Jaak Van Assche										Guest	Main	Main	Main	Main	Main	Main	Main	Main	Main	Main	Main	Starring
Maurice de Praetere	Tuur De Weert													Guest	Recurring	Recurring	Main	Main	Main	Main	Main	Main	Starring
Character	Portrayed by	1	2	3	4	5	6	7	8	9	10	11	12	13	14	15	16	17	18	19	20	21	2020 TV Special
Character	Portrayed by	Seasons																					2020 TV Special

=== Main characters ===
Character	Actor	Years	Season(s)	Episodes	Movies	TV Special	Description
Balthasar Boma	Marijn Devalck	1990–2020	1–21	1–273	1, 2, 3 & 4	Yes	Balthasar Boma is the rich owner of a sausage factory, yet almost nobody likes his products. It is revealed his company does not go bankrupt because the foreign, profitable companies of family members continue to pump money into the Boma factory. He is also chairman of the soccer club and owns the canteen and field. He believes he is an intelligent businessman, but often embarrasses himself by pronouncing English business terms incorrectly or by messing up Dutch sayings. Besides this, he usually dresses in costumes that others describe as being "made of curtains." These aspects occasionally lead to the soccer team making fun of him, after which he might threaten to sell the soccer grounds to their hostile neighbor. Luckily, he always changes his mind at the last minute. Balthasar is addicted to sex and frequently visits night clubs. In most seasons, he also tries to seduce Pascale, in which endeavor he partially succeeds. Finally, he starts a relationship with Goedele, which largely puts an end to his sexual debauchery.
Pascale De Backer	Danni Heylen	1990–2020	1–21	1–273	1, 2, 3 & 4	Yes	Pascale De Backer leases the soccer canteen from Balthasar Boma. She has a friendly attitude, but can be rather pretentious and likes to keep up appearances. Every time something bad or embarrassing occurs, she wonders aloud what her - rich and successful - sister Madeleine would think about it. In the first seasons, Pascale is married to the club's original trainer Oscar Crucke, with whom she has a daughter Bieke. Later on, she starts an on-again, off-again relationship with Balthasar Boma, who however keeps cheating on her. She eventually falls in love with municipal worker Maurice de Praetere, whom she later on discovers to be a nobleman and castle owner, much to her delight.
Oscar Crucke	Carry Goossens	1990–1993, 2015–2019	1–4	1–52	2, 3 & 4	No (AF)	Oscar Crucke is the original trainer of the soccer team. During his youth, he was a successful soccer player, but that part of his life ended after he was forced to marry his pregnant then-girlfriend Pascale De Backer. Over the course of his presence in the series, Oscar tries to act as the head of his family, but gets constantly opposed by his frustrated wife and their adolescent daughter Bieke. The bad results of his team and the suggested sexual tension between his wife and Balthasar Boma, add up to Oscar seeing himself as a failure. He is last seen in episode 52, the final episode of season 4. In the original episode he literally vanished during a magical trick. In reruns the scène is adjusted: Oscar leaves the canteen in a hurry after he realizes his father booked a trip to Tenerife, the same destination as nemesis Georgette Verreth. At the start of season 5, it is told that he converted to Hare Krishna and now lives in Kathmandu.
Maurice de Praetere	Tuur De Weert (also appeared in E90 in S7 in 1997 as postinspector De Kegel and in E145 in S12 in 2001 as pigeon seller)	2003–2020	13–21	168–173, 175–176, 179–182, 184, 186–187, 189, 191–195, 197–198, 200, 202–215, 217–225, 227–230, 233–244, 246–249, 252–253, 255–257, 259–273	1, 2, 3 & 4	Yes	Maurice de Praetere is a handyman who works at the town hall. He is a rather mysterious man and many good and bad secrets about him are revealed over time: he is a nobleman but forbids Pascale to tell anyone, he has/had a gambling and alcohol addiction, he is well befriended with Philippe of Belgium, ... He has impressive encyclopaedic knowledge and constantly uses this in social encounters. Maurice first appears in episode 168, in which he comes to help redecorate Pascale's living room. Eventually, he and Pascale start a relationship, which leads to Pascale's former lover Balthasar Boma hating him. The development of their romance is interfered with by Maurice's very demanding mother, whom he does not want to neglect, not even in favor of Pascale. After his mother's death, he inherits a (uninhabitable) castle. Yet he insists on maintaining their normal life.
† Xavier Waterslaeghers	Johny Voners	1990–2019	1–21	1–273	1, 2, 3 & 4	No (AF)	Xavier Waterslaeghers is the team's goalkeeper. He has a long career in the Belgian army, but never achieved a big promotion. This does not bother him at all, because any responsibility would threaten the spare time he spends drinking beer. Xavier is heavily dominated by his wife Carmen and therefore spends as much time as possible at the canteen, rather than to be at home. His libido is also a lot lower than hers, which adds up to his escapism. In the early seasons, Xavier has a side job as an insurance broker. Later on, Carmen forces him to work at her newsagents, followed by her friterie. Finally, he ends up working part-time at the canteen. After Oscar Crucke left, Xavier was promoted to trainer, but after a few seasons, he passed on that role to Pol De Tremmerie. Carmen has never really forgiven Xavier for making her lose the status of trainer's wife. Xavier died during a military operation in Ethiopia.
Carmen Vandormael	Loes Van den Heuvel	1990–2020	1–21	1–241, 244, 246–273	1, 2, 3 & 4	Yes	Carmen Vandormael, often called by her husband's name Waterslaeghers, is the wife of Xavier. She has a dominant and extrovert attitude and dresses in eye-catching clothes, often showing cleavage and containing bright colors or feline prints. She has a form of grandiosity. Carmen is the cleaning lady at Balthasar Boma's mansion, but refers to herself as his "Hygiene Manager". Later on the series, she starts combining this job with other professions, such as operating a newsagents and a friterie, before eventually fulfilling her dream of becoming a television celebrity as the host of a phone-in quizz. She only keeps the job because she is laughed at by the viewers, but she does not want to acknowledge/realize this. Carmen loves all kinds of gossip, often leading to misunderstandings that affect the people around her. She does not fear name-calling when she expects someone to have done something wrong.
Pico Coppens	Walter Michiels	1990–1993	1–4	1–52	No	No (AF)	Pico Coppens is the striker of the soccer team for the first four seasons of the series. He is a school teacher who makes extra money by repairing televisions. He is also an active member of a local political party opposite of Balthasar Boma's, which leads to a difficult understanding between the two of them. Pico is however the only good player of the team, which forces chairman Boma to keep him around. Pico is married to Doortje and during the third season, they get a son named Billie. It is rumored that Pico flirts with other women, but there is no proof he actually cheats on Doortje. That is until the start of season 5, where it is explained that Pico and Doortje have got divorced because he had an affair with one of his female colleagues, and that he has subsequently left the team. Pico is last seen in episode 52, the final episode of season 4.
Doortje Van Hoeck	Ann Tuts	1990–2020	1–21	1–101, 105–126, 131–258, 260–273	1, 2, 3 & 4	Yes	Doortje is a shy and somewhat strait-laced lady who can nevertheless be assertive when necessary. She is first married to Pico, who abandons her and their child Billie. Doortje starts off as a secretary at Dimitri's garage and later on becomes Boma's secretary. She finds love again with Pol, although their relationship goes through many ups and downs, especially because she feels like he loves his soccer game more than her. The others often mock her because of her puritanical lifestyle and her vegan cooking. She once is told she has no humor, since then she occasionally tries to make fun jokes and humorous comments, but she mostly fails.
Pol De Tremmerie	Ben Rottiers	1994–2020	5–21	53–258, 260–273	1, 2, 3 & 4	Yes	Pol is a nephew of Dimitri's and lived in the (fictional) town Kibongo somewhere in Burundi for some years. Now he is a schoolteacher. Pol starts as the team's new striker, but after an injury he becomes their trainer. Most times he is a very nice and socially engaged guy, although sometimes he seems to have gained some of his uncle's traits, especially in terms of being stingy. The only thing he does not care spending money on, is soccer. It is made clear on many occasions that he is more interested in soccer than in Doortje.
Bieke Crucke	An Swartenbroekx	1990–2020	1–21	1–6, 8–10, 12–16, 21–101, 105–132, 134–135, 138–264, 266–273	1, 2, 3 & 4	Yes	Bieke is Pascale and Oscar's daughter. She is a clever woman and resolves disputes in many episode. Early on the series, she is a dissolute student dating various guys at once. She moved to the United States for her studies, but unexpectedly returned with a vague explanation. She falls in love with Marc, with whom she marries and gets a daughter. Bieke starts her career as a journalist and eventually becomes a marketer. She is offered a job in the United States and moves once again but the company goes broken and she returns. Afterwards she starts up an event company. Bieke does not get along with Boma, for reasons such as his vulgar attitude and his unhealthy meat business, and mainly because of the sexual tension between him and her mother.
Marc Vertongen	Herman Verbruggen (also appeared in E186 in S15 in 2004 as Marc's twin brother Bart Vertongen)	1990, 1992–2020	1, 3–21	1, 3–4, 9, 11–13, 29, 36, 47–54, 56–72, 74–86, 88, 90–264, 266–273	1, 2, 3 & 4	Yes	Marc fell in love with Bieke, which at first pleased Pascale because he was studying to become a doctor. However, he is a clumsy, naïve, childish jack of all trades. Marc started off as the team's goalkeeper, but later got the position of striker, although he can't play soccer at all. He has worked as a policeman, undertaker, ice cream seller, cook, animal keeper, soldier, assistant in Carmen's friterie... Since the start of the series he has been a volunteer DJ at Radio Hallo. This is the only job he has been able to keep throughout the series, although he was once fired after he burnt down the studio by accident. Thanks to Maurice he gets a fulltime job at the municipality as "substitute for all kind of tasks". He helps Pascale with the meals served in the canteen.
Dimitri De Tremmerie ("DDT")	Jacques Vermeire	1990–1998, 2010, 2015–2020	1–8, 20	1–104, 260	2, 3 & 4	Yes	Dimitri (nicknamed DDT) is the first antagonist of the series. He is the owner of a garage which is located next to the soccer field. The cars he sells are wrecks and he charges much money for repairs he never did. He is a shady, stingy man who dislikes the soccer team. The main reason for that is because the players frequently kick a ball through one of his windows. The times when Boma threatens to quit sponsoring the soccer team, DDT always tries to persuade him into selling the field to him, as he wants to turn it into a huge parking lot. In most episodes, DDT either tries to sabotage the team, or deceive them to earn more money. Although he is far from being friends with the team, there are also times when they do get along with each other. In the final scene of season 8, DDT is seen being arrested. In the opening scene of season 9, it is explained that he was sent to jail after being found guilty of tax fraud. Years later, at the end of season 20, DDT returns for one episode after having escaped.
Bernard Theofiel Waterslaeghers ("BTW")	Jakob Beks (also appeared in E57 in S5 in 1994 as Mike Verfaillie)	1998–2000, 2019	9–10	105–130	4	No (AF)	Bernard (nicknamed BTW) is a cousin of Xavier who buys the garage after DDT is sent to jail. He becomes the second antagonist. BTW starts a chic restaurant and wants to earn Michelin-stars. Due to his arrogance, pedantry and the long waiting times most people leave the restaurant early. He is able to prepare high-quality dishes, but due to unexpected events the end result is more than once a failure. In season 10, he gains a pet rabbit, which he wanted to slaughter first to cook for his guests... until he looked the rabbit in its cute little eyes. In the final episode of season 10, he sells his restaurant to Fernand for a very cheap price after he received a fake letter which said that the municipality was going to demolish it.
Fernand Costermans	Jaak Van Assche	2000–2020	10–21	129–138, 140–205, 207–257, 259–273	1, 2, 3 & 4	Yes	Fernand is the shady owner of an "antique shop" and is the third antagonist in the series. He buys Bernard's restaurant at a knock-down price in the final episode of season 10 after making him believe the building is due for demolition. He tries to convince his customers that his goods are high quality and have belonged to very important persons. In reality, Fernand sells only junk, mostly stuff found on rubbish dumps. Fernand is very stingy and is always trying to wangle money out of people, especially Marc. When customers are reluctant to buy, he tries to persuade them by telling them he has a wife and seven sick children to support. Although nobody believes this fact, they turn up in last episode but all of them are perfectly healthy. Fernand is in love with Carmen and does almost everything to get closer to her.
Nero	portrayed by different dogs including Moestiek (1992-2001), Sloeber (2001-2004), Lily (2004-2011), Whisky (2020) and differents dogs in the 4 movies	1992–2020	3–21	28–36, 38–41, 43, 46–47, 52–54, 58, 60–66, 68–71, 74, 76–77, 82–83, 85, 88, 90, 92, 94, 96–97, 101, 103–109, 111–113, 115, 118–121, 123–127, 129, 131–141, 143–148, 150–164, 166–241, 244, 246–253, 255–258, 260–273	1, 2, 3 & 4	Yes	Nero is Carmens Yorkshire Terrier. She got the dog as a present after she feigned MDD. The dog is named after Nero from the albums The Adventures of Nero. Carmen adores and treats the dog as her own child and gives him better treatment than Xavier. Although it is a male, she puts him in similar clothes and accessories that she's wearing . Carmen is convinced that Nero can be used for all possible dog tasks: guard dog, fighting dog, sniffer dog, circus dog, rescue dog .. All of these tasks fail except the acting in a commercial, but Carmen withdraw after she found out the commercial was about cat food and Nero was the underdog.

=== Recurring characters ===
(in progress)

Character	Actor	Years	Season(s)	Episodes	Movies	TV Special	Description
Marijke	Greet Rouffaer	1990–1992, 2020	1–3	1, 10, 14, 16, 31	No	Yes (voice)	Marijke is a photographer and journalist at a regional magazine. She once took professional photos of Bieke. When the soccer team organised an event or something remarkable had happened, she popped up in the canteen. She was hired at Radio Hallo by Boma, because of her beautiful voice, but the real reason was probably that he had an eye on her. In S2 E3: Naar Amerika (E14) she revealed to the team that Boma is not an acquaintance of Jean-Marie Pfaff as he always claimed. He had taken part in a competition and was allowed to have his picture taken with Pfaff. She was last seen in S3 E5: Besmet (E31). She appeared in the opening credits of every episode in the first four seasons. 28 years later she returned as DJ of Radio Hallo, working with Marc and still has contact with the team.
† Georgette Verreth ("Ma DDT")	Jenny Tanghe	1990, 1992–1993, 1995–1998, 2005–2006	1, 3–5, 7–9, 15–16	12, 33, 52, 65, 80, 92, 101–103, 105, 193, 201	No (picture only in 3 & 4)	No (AF)	Georgette is DDT's dominant mother. She believes her son runs a well-managed business. During the rare moments where it gets clear to her that the opposite is true, she mostly blames secretary Doortje for it and even tries to replace her, much to DDT's frustration. Georgette is meanwhile determined to find the right wife for her son, which also displeases him. After Dimitri is jailed, she appears one more time to sell the garage and two more times to visit her cousin Pol. Her final appearance is in season 16. In season 20, it is mentioned that she has passed away and donated her savings to Pol.
Truus Pinckers	Vera Puts (also appeared in movie 1 & 2 as Dutch tourist Mien)	1991–1992, 1999, 2005	2–3, 9, 16	16, 28, 112, 200	No	No	Truus is a Dutch psychologist and (relationship) therapist who speaks with a heavy Dutch accent. In her first appearance she studied Bieke's application to study in America for a year. In her second appearance she asked Bieke the reason why she returned earlier from America what turned out to be homesick and she studied the "depression" of Doortje after the birth of her son Billie. In her third appearance she tried to give Doortje more self-confidence and independence. This worked a little too well, because Doortje transformed into a Carmen character. In her fourth and last appearance she advised Carmen to redo her honeymoon in Blankenberge with Xavier to strengthen their relationship. Truus was once briefly married with BTW in Las Vegas but the same day the two divorced after a disagreement. The two planned to marry again with each other but the plan is immediately cancelled due to disagreement about the wedding date. Vera Puts later played in the first two movies Mien, a Dutch tourist who with her husband Joop (Gert Hulleman) went on vacation in South of France in movie 1 and the two gave Carmen a lift, but because of her bad behavior she was soon thrown out of the car. Later their caravan was accidentally destroyed by Marc who did it again in the second movie with Xavier and Oscar when the couple were in Belgium.
Sergeant De Kroet	Dirk Vermiert	1991–1992, 1995	2–3, 6	17, 31, 69 (picture only from 17 in 143)	No	No	De Kroet was the firm sergeant in the army where Xavier worked and was his boss in the early years. He has a nervous twitch near his right eye. In his first appearance it is said that he once bit off the ear of his wife's lover. Because of that people nicknamed him "the biter". In the same episode Carmen hit him with her handbag off-screen when De Kroet refused to let her and Xavier into the army ball because Xavier only had the rank of corporal. Xavier got the last change to became sergeant and passed his exams with the help of Boma, Pico, Oscar and DDT which he never knew and De Kroet who was against him even attacked him. In his second appearance Xavier had to take a "dangerous virus" to the military hospital by De Kroet. Later it turned out that it was not a virus, but frozen lobsters that De Kroet wanted to use for a party, thus revealing that he wasn't a good sergeant at all. He was last seen in S6 E4: Blauwhelmen (E69) and in S11 E13: Soep van duifjes (E143) a picture of him from E17 is used by Carmen and Xavier in an illegal shooting exercise. In S14 E1: Baby Baby (E183) De Kroet was succeeded in the army by Sergeant Major Janine Dewolf (Janine Bischops), Xavier's first love. The character lieutenant De Decker played a similar role in the last seasons.
Billie Coppens	Several baby's	1992–1993	3–4	27, 29–31, 35, 39, 42, 46	No	No	Billie is the son of Doortje and Pico. He was born in season 3, but grew up off-screen until his return in season 11 as a then 13-year-old boy. In the following seasons, he wants to be a cool teenager with girlfriends, fashion, tattoos, motorcycles and rock music whereas his mother wants to raise him very conservative. He has a much better bond with his stepfather Pol, except when it comes to his lack of interest in sports. Billie also likes to spend time with Boma, whom he calls "Copain". It is unknown whether he has contact with his biological father Pico. In the regular series Billie is last seen in season 18, when moving from Pol and Doortje's apartment to a dormitory. In the 2020 Christmas special, he returns: it is revealed he lives in the United States and works as a Chippendales strip dancer.
Billie Coppens	Remco	1994–1996	5–7	56, 63, 65, 70, 79–80	No	No	
Billie Coppens	Laurent Roose	2001–2002	11–12	56, 63, 65, 70, 79–80	No	No	
Billie Coppens	Rob Teuwen	2003–2008, 2020	13–18	161–162, 165, 167, 170, 172, 174, 176, 178, 180, 182, 185, 188, 191, 193–196, 198, 201, 204, 209, 215, 218, 220, 224, 226–227	No	Yes	
Colonel Germain Vandesijpe	Ron Cornet	1992, 1995, 1997, 1998–2000, 2002	3, 6–10, 12–13	31, 69, 86, 93, 96, 103, 106, 114, 117, 128, 130, 156–157	No	No	Germain is Xavier's stereotypical strict army colonel, but off work he is mostly a close friend of Boma. Germain and Boma spend a lot of time at the local nightclub, named the pussycat, even though Germain is married. He is last seen in season 13, after which a new character appears as colonel.
Seppe Van De Kruis	Daan Hugaert	1995, 2000	6, 10	69, 128	No	No	A colleague and good friend of Xavier.
Madeleine De Backer	Denise Daems	1996	7	82	No	No	Madeleine is the rich sister of Pascale. She lives in a big mansion, drives a very expensive car, visits exotic locations, attends exclusive parties, and so on. Pascale is very jealous of Madeleine and whenever something bad of embarrassing happens, she fears "what Madeleine would think about it."
Madeleine De Backer	Leah Thys	2000, 2005, 2009, 2011, 2013	11, 15, 19, 21	134, 195, 239, 273	1	No	Madeleine is the rich sister of Pascale. She lives in a big mansion, drives a very expensive car, visits exotic locations, attends exclusive parties, and so on. Pascale is very jealous of Madeleine and whenever something bad of embarrassing happens, she fears "what Madeleine would think about it."
Marie-Paule Vertongen	Lea Couzin	1997, 2003, 2005, 2009–2010, 2013	7, 14–15, 19–20	86, 171, 190–191, 195, 239, 253	1	No	The mother of Marc Vertongen. She runs a funeral home together with her husband Theo.
Theo Vertongen	Alex Cassiers	1997, 2003, 2005, 2009–2010	7, 14–15, 19–20	86, 171, 190, 195, 239, 253	No	No	The father of Marc Vertongen. He runs a funeral home together with his wife Marie-Paule.
Jean-Luc Grootjans	Fred van Kuyk	1997, 2003, 2005–2011, 2013	8, 13, 15, 16, 17, 18, 19, 20, 21	93, 164, 187, 192, 205, 211, 223–224, 238, 245, 249, 258, 272–273	1	No	Jean-Luc is a competitor of Balthasar in all ways. Jean-Luc also has a meat processing factory, has a soccer team, owns Radio Figaro and is befriended with the mayor.
Jerôme Dubois	Michel De Warzee	2000, 2005, 2009, 2011, 2013	11, 15, 19, 21	134, 195, 239, 273	1	No	Jerôme is married to Madeleine, but their relationship is not very stable. Jerôme gets intimate with other women as soon he drinks one sip of hard liquor, much to Madeleine's embarrassment.
Helga Botermans	Kadèr Gürbüz		12, 14, 16, 20, 21				A psychologist with many different appearances over the years, each as a psychologist in a different field. Every time it turns out that she is a bit crazy and totally fails in her job
Saartje Dubois	Ella Leyers		13, 14, 15, 16, 17				Saartje is the granddaughter of Jerôme and Madeleine and often works in the soccer canteen. She goes to the same school as Billie and often hangs out with him. They are both sexually interested in each other, but Saartje backs off every time Billie is unable to stand up against his conservative mother.
Freddy Van Overloop	Luk d'Heu		13, 14, 16, 17, 18, 19, 21				Freddy is the local mayor. He is a close friend of Balthasar. Thanks to him, Balthasar easily manages to keep his polluting factory running, which would be far more difficult if the correct regulations were followed. It is clear Freddy is a hedonist and does not take his role as mayor very seriously. One example is the fact that he hires the clumsy Marc Vertongen as a municipal worker just so he could get some laughter in between work. Also, various scenes suggest he is having an affair with his younger secretary.
Senne Stevens	Ludo Hellinx		13, 15, 17, 19				A colleague and good friend of Xavier.
Goedele Decocq	Machteld Timmermans		19, 20, 21				Goedele is an anthropologist who travelled around the world. She meets Balthasar Boma in Fernand's shop. Balthasar immediately falls in love with her, but she claims to be not interested in him. Goedele already had a marriage that failed, since then she does not trust men anymore. At some point, Balthasar demands her to kiss him. After the kiss, she realizes she does love him. They start a relationship and Goedele soon moves into Balthasar's mansion, together with her son Ronald.
Ronald 'Ronaldinho' Decocq	Niels Destadsbader		20, 21				Ronald is the son of Goedele. As he likes everything which is related to Brazil he is convinced his father is a talented Brazilian soccer player, most probably Ronaldinho. He dreams to become a famous soccer player, but is not aware he is not that talented at all. He thus fits the FC De Kampioenen soccer team pretty well. Ronald gets along really well with his stepfather Boma, certainly because of their shared passion for women and partying.

== TV series (1990–2011) ==
Season	Episodes	Originally released	
Season	Episodes	First released	Last released
1	13	October 6, 1990	December 29, 1990
2	13	October 5, 1991	December 28, 1991
3	13	October 10, 1992	January 2, 1993
4	13	October 2, 1993	December 25, 1993
5	13	December 3, 1994	February 25, 1995
6	13	December 2, 1995	February 24, 1996
7	13	December 7, 1996	March 1, 1997
8	13	December 6, 1997	February 28, 1998
9	13	November 28, 1998	February 20, 1999
10	13	November 27, 1999	February 19, 2000
11	13	December 2, 2000	February 24, 2001
12	13	December 8, 2001	March 2, 2002
13	13	December 7, 2002	March 1, 2003
14	13	December 6, 2003	February 28, 2004
15	13	December 4, 2004	February 26, 2005
16	13	December 3, 2005	February 25, 2006
17	13	December 16, 2006	March 10, 2007
18	13	December 15, 2007	March 8, 2008
19	13	December 13, 2008	March 7, 2009
20	13	December 19, 2009	March 20, 2010
21	13	December 4, 2010	February 26, 2011

== TV special (2020) ==
In October 2019 plans were announced to film a 22nd season consisting of 8 episodes. The future of this project was left in limbo after the death of main cast member Johny Voners in March 2020, as several cast members came forward expressing they did not like the idea of continuing the franchise without him.

In July 2020, it was announced that the cast would instead reunite to film a 90-minute episode, which will be set during Christmas time and address the loss of Voners' character. The episode was released on December 25, 2020. Returning main cast members from the television series include Marijn Devalck, Danni Heylen, An Swartenbroekx, Loes Van den Heuvel, Ann Tuts, Herman Verbruggen, Ben Rottiers, Jaak Van Assche, Tuur De Weert, and Jacques Vermeire, alongside recurring cast members Machteld Timmermans, Niels Destadsbader, Rob Teuwen, and Luk D'Heu. Johny Voners and Carry Goossens appear in flashbacks scenes through archive footage, which also include brief shots of Walter Michiels, Jakob Beks and some of the former guest stars.

Plot

Six months after the death of Xavier Waterslaeghers, the remaining core of F.C. De Kampioenen holds a Christmas party at the cafe. Carmen does not feel like going, but changes her mind after receiving a letter from her late husband. Fernand and DDT are invited as well, but are too stingy to pay for food and Christmas gifts. Both men still know their tricks and cheat Marc out of money of the newly established Xavier Waterslaeghers Fund. As a gift for Doortje, Pol has invited her son Billie. It is revealed that Billie has been living in America, and why Doortje has not spoken about him for years. However, the most precious gift is that for Carmen, by a surprise question by Ronald and Niki.

== Theatrical movies ==
=== Failed attempts for a movie ===
A first attempt to create a theatrical movie was done in 1993. However, the film was cancelled as actor Carry Goossens decided to work for a competing broadcasting company (vtm) and actor Walter Michiels was fired due to his alcohol abuse. Furthermore, Jacques Vermeire had his own film plans and his movie Max was to be shot and released in same period.

A new scenario was written in 2008 but rejected by most of the actors.

=== F.C. De Kampioenen: Kampioen zijn blijft plezant (2013) ===
In 2011 a complete new story was written which was accepted by the actors. Due to funding issues it took until April 2013 before filming started. The movie was released in December 2013 as F.C. De Kampioenen: Kampioen zijn blijft plezant ('F.C. The Champions: being a champion remains fun').

Returning main cast members from the television series include Marijn Devalck, Danni Heylen, An Swartenbroekx, Johny Voners, Loes Van den Heuvel, Ann Tuts, Herman Verbruggen, Ben Rottiers, Jaak Van Assche, and Tuur De Weert, alongside recurring cast members Machteld Timmermans, Niels Destadsbader, Lea Couzin, Fred Van Kuyk, Leah Thys, and Michel De Warzee.

Plot

Boma wants to buy a vineyard and château in France from an oil sheik not knowing most part of the land will be expropriated due to the construction of a TGV. Boma is now negotiating with Tartuffe, a representative of the sheik. Tartuffe invites FC De Kampioenen to come over to France to play a match of soccer against the team of Saint-Tintin. Due to a miscommunication between Tartuffe and the sheik, last one thinks Ronald, foreman of De Kampioenen, is the Brazilian footballer Ronaldinho and offers him a contract.

De Kampioenen head to France, but the journey has some unexpected events. Pol and Doortje just married and Doortje wants to go on honeymoon to Lourdes. Pol sabotages the trip so he can go to Saint-Tintin. Doortje finds out the truth and enters a convent. The coach bus is an outdated model driven by Fernand Costermans who hides a pig in the trunk so he can search for truffles. Everybody is tired of Carmen's involvements, so Xavier decides to leave her behind at a road house. Bieke is brassed off with the childish behavior of Mark and starts a romance with a Frenchman. Pascale is obsessed by châteaus and demands Maurice to finally renovate his mother's castle or to buy another one.

Ronald finds out the real intentions of the sheik, but is kidnapped by Tartuffe before he could inform De Kampioenen. Carlita, a hitchhiker travelling with De Kampioenen, is actually a helper of Tartuffe. She has a guilty conscience and sets up a rescue operation together with De Kampioenen.

=== F.C. De Kampioenen 2: Jubilee general (2015) ===
In August 2014, there were rumors of a second movie which were confirmed in October 2014. It was released on October 28, 2015.

Returning main cast members from the television series include Marijn Devalck, Danni Heylen, An Swartenbroekx, Johny Voners, Loes Van den Heuvel, Ann Tuts, Herman Verbruggen, Ben Rottiers, Jaak Van Assche, Tuur De Weert, Jacques Vermeire, and Carry Goossens, alongside recurring cast members Machteld Timmermans, Niels Destadsbader, and Luk D'Heu.

Plot

F.C. De Kampioenen prepares a big celebration party for their 25th anniversary. Carmen, Doortje, Pascale and Bieke reunite with their band The Championettes. Marc and Xavier travel to Thailand and can convince Oscar to leave Hare Krishna and to return to Belgium. Oscar his old habits come back: he wants to be the trainer once again, the bickers between him and Pascale restart,... This all gets at it top when it is revealed Goedele and Oscar had a one-night stand on 31 December 1993 and Ronaldinho was conceived that night, meaning Oscar is the biological father of the boy and not the famous soccer player Ronaldinho as the young man always thought.

Meanwhile, their main antagonist DDT is released from prison. He wins from Boma in a game of poker and becomes owner of last one's Cadillac, the soccer canteen and the soccer field. Boma consults his lawyers and they confirm due to the fact he signed a paper in which he hands over these properties and with witnesses, DDT is now indeed the legal owner. Boma and Fernand set up a trap so DDT ends up in a container on a boat heading to Africa, not knowing Doortje is also in the trap by accident. DDT and Doortje manage to return to Belgium. He wants revenge and hires some bulldozers to demolish the pub next to the soccer field so he can build his new garage, not knowing the current building is classified and must remain as is.

=== F.C. De Kampioenen 3: Forever (2017) ===
In January 2016, it was confirmed that a third movie would be made. Filming started in the summer of 2017, and the movie was released in December 2017.

Returning main cast members from the television series include Marijn Devalck, Danni Heylen, An Swartenbroekx, Johny Voners, Loes Van den Heuvel, Ann Tuts, Herman Verbruggen, Ben Rottiers, Jaak Van Assche, Tuur De Weert, Jacques Vermeire, and Carry Goossens, alongside recurring cast members Machteld Timmermans, Niels Destadsbader, and Luk D'Heu.

Plot

Balthasar Boma is arrested for severe food safety offences. DDT offers Boma to buy F.C. De Kampioenen, which would enable the latter to bond out of jail. Boma accepts the deal, but soon regrets it when DDT replaces all current players by younger and better ones. DDT eventually agrees on offering the old Kampioenen a chance: one match against DDT's team, after which the winner gets to keep the club. The old Kampioenen realize they stand no chance, unless they attract new players as well. Pol remembers having seen a lot of potential soccer talents back when he was working in Africa, and convinces his friends to join him on a scouting trip.

=== F.C. De Kampioenen 4: Viva Boma (2019) ===
The fourth movie was filmed early 2019 and released in December 2019.

Returning main cast members from the television series include Marijn Devalck, Danni Heylen, An Swartenbroekx, Johny Voners, Loes Van den Heuvel, Ann Tuts, Herman Verbruggen, Ben Rottiers, Jaak Van Assche, Tuur De Weert, Jacques Vermeire, Carry Goossens, and Jakob Beks, alongside recurring cast members Machteld Timmermans, Niels Destadsbader, and Luk D'Heu.

Plot

F.C. De Kampioenen mourns the loss of their chairman Balthasar Boma, who was reportedly killed by a bunch of wild kangaroos while on holiday in Australia. Ronald becomes his successor at the meat factory, but does not seem to be fit for the job. His focus soon shifts to his new love interest Niki, who turns out to be the daughter of Dimitri De Tremmerie. DDT sees a new opportunity to lay his hands on Boma's company and take revenge on De Kampioenen. The latter meanwhile plan to join a carnival procession in which they will honor Boma and his final brainchild: the "Viva Boma" sausage. After receiving a surprising phone call, Doortje tries to convince everyone that Boma is still alive.

== Comics adaptations ==
Since 1997 F.C. De Kampioenen has been adapted into a successful celebrity comic series, F.C. De Kampioenen, drawn by Hec Leemans. This comic book series kept on running after the TV series discontinued. Also the role of Xavier kept unchanged after the passing of actor Johny Voners who played that role in the TV series.

== Plopsaland: Kampioenen café ==
Plopsa, the theme park division of Studio 100, gained the rights to open a "FC De Kampioenen"-pub in 2014. The first pub opened in Plopsaland De Panne. It's a partial replica of the canteen and the antique shop. There are references to other places such as The Pussycat, the loft of Mark and Bieke and Radio Hallo. A second pub opened together with the opening of Plopsa Station Antwerp

== Trivia ==
- FC De Kampioenen was once the longest-running Belgian sitcom in number of seasons (21) and episodes (273). It was however beaten by De Kotmadam which has 24 seasons and 352 episodes. In terms of audience measurement FC De Kampioenen breaks all records with an average 1.2 million viewers for its last season in 2011 whereas De Kotmadam only ends at 750.000 for its 23rd season in 2019.
- The producers revealed that Boma's clothes were indeed made from curtain material as was many times insinuated/said in the series.
- When last name of Goedele or Ronald is said, it is always mentioned as "De Cocq" with 'cq' at the end". This is a reference to "Jurriaan de Cock", created by A. C. Baantjer, from the successful Dutch books and television series Baantjer. Jurriaan addresses himself invariably as ""De Cock" with 'ck' at the end"
- In January 2021 there was an exposition in Antwerpen-Centraal railway station. The original sets and props were used and the original actors portrayed their role.
