= Witse =

Belgian Dutch language crime drama

- DVD box with all seasons and the movie
- Genre: Drama; Police
- Created by: Ward Hulselmans
- Written by: Bas Adriaensen; Ward Hulselmans; Dirk Nielandt; Carl Joos; Koen Vermeiren and others
- Directed by: Peter Rondou; Vincent Rouffaer; Eric Taelman; Luc Coghe; Georges terryn Koen Verweirder
- Starring: Hubert Damen, Daan Hugaert, Mark Stroobants, Inge Paulussen, Alice Toen, Viv Van Dingenen
- Composer: Steve Willaert
- Country of origin: Belgium
- Original language: Dutch
- No. of seasons: 9
- No. of episodes: 117

Production
- Producers: Dirk Haegemans; Luc Roggen; Ludo Schats; Marina Willems

Original release
- Network: Eén (VRT, Streamz); Nederland 1 (NPO 1, Videoland)
- Release: 11 January 2004 – 1 April 2012

Witse is a Dutch language crime drama produced by Belgian broadcaster VRT and broadcast on their één channel. It is also shown on BVN. It was first broadcast in 2004 and ran for nine seasons, with the final one airing in 2012. It starred Hubert Damen as the eponymous Witse, a driven inspector in the Belgian federal police based in Halle. It was one of the most popular Flemish television programmes with some 1.6 million viewers.

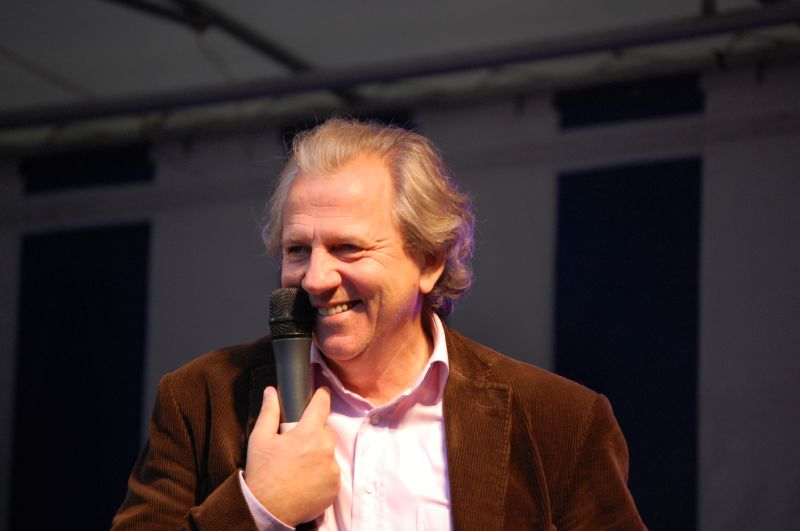
Main actor Hubert Damen

There are also Witse books. The first three were based on the last two episodes of each season, but since 2010 every six months a brand new story was published, written and invented by established Belgian (crime) writers, as Bob Van Laerhoven and Bart Van Lierde.

The music for Witse is composed by Steve Willaert.
