= Joseph Plateau Awards 1998 =

12th Joseph Plateau Awards

2005

Best Film:
Le bal masqué

The 12th Joseph Plateau Awards honoured the best Belgian filmmaking of 1997 and 1998.

== Winners and nominees ==
=== Best Belgian Actor ===
Dirk Roofthooft - Hombres complicados

- Josse De Pauw - Hombres complicados
- Peter Van den Begin - Le bal masqué

=== Best Belgian Actress ===
Pascale Bal - Le bal masqué

- Hilde Van Mieghem - Hombres complicados
- Francesca Vanthielen - When the Light Comes

=== Best Belgian Director ===
Julien Vrebos - Le bal masqué

- Stijn Coninx - When the Light Comes
- Dominique Deruddere - Hombres complicados

=== Best Belgian Film ===
Le bal masqué

- Hombres complicados
- When the Light Comes (Licht)

=== Box Office Award ===
Oesje!
