= Chris Cauwenberghs =

Belgian actor (1947–2025)

- Chris Cauwenberghs as Fernand Verbist in Thuis (1996)
- Born: 4 February 1947; Hemiksem, Belgium
- Died: 23 April 2025 (aged 78); Veurne, Belgium
- Occupation: Actor
- Years active: 1976-2014

Chris Cauwenberghs (4 February 1947 – 23 April 2025) was a Belgian actor.

He was best known for portraying Kabouter Lui in Kabouter Plop (1997–2014) and Fernand Verbist in Thuis (1995, 1996, 1997–2000, 2004)

== Life and career ==
Cauwenberghs was born in Hemiksem on 4 February 1947. He studied drama at the Royal Conservatory of Brussels and there received lessons from Nand Buyl and Leo Dewals.

From the late 1970s, Cauwenberghs often played colorful characters in Flemish and Dutch films and series. His film roles included De Witte van Sichem, Vrijdag (both 1980), the Gaston & Leo films Zware jongens (1984) and Paniekzaaiers (1986), the Dominique Deruddere film Crazy Love (1987), the Stijn Coninx and Urbanus films Hector (1987) and Koko Flanel (1990), the Roland Verhavert film Boerenpsalm (1989) and the Jan Verheyen film Boys (1991).

From 1995 to 2000, he played the former side and later main character Fernand Verbist, a police officer in the VRT 1 soap opera Thuis. He was introduced in the second episode and appeared sporadically. In season 3 in 1997, he was promoted to main character and his family first appeared. After a series of health problems, Cauwenberghs could not combine his role with that in Kabouter Plop, so he left Thuis after 5 years. Fernand was murdered in the fifth season finale by Pierre Vinck, his daughter Eva's lover who was actually a psychopath. He dead corpse also appeared in the beginning of season 6 and he appeared as a ghost in the special: Afscheid van Florke in 2004.

From 1997 to 2014, he played the role of Kabouter Lui in the children's series Kabouter Plop. He also played the role in 9 films between 1999 and 2012.

He also appeared in the TV series Liegebeest (1983–1987), Merlina (1983), Meester, hij begint weer! (1985, 1990), Carlos & Co (1987–1989), Langs de Kade (1988), Postbus X (1990), RIP (1992–1993) Buiten De Zone (1996), De Familie Backeljau (1995–1997), Samson en Gert (1999), Brussel Nieuwsstraat (2000, 2002), Big & Betsy (2000–2003), De Kotmadam (2005, 2009, 2010), Verschoten & Zoon (2005), Spring (2006), Aspe (2009) and Galaxy Park (2011). In April 2012, he played the role of Friar Tuck in the revival of the Studio 100-musical Robin Hood.

In 2014, it became known that Cauwenberghs had been diagnosed with cancer of the lymph nodes, causing him to be unable to perform as Kabouter Lui at Plopshows in the Autumn.

In July 2015, production house Studio 100 announced that Chris's health was improving. After heavy chemotherapy and radiation treatment, the actor had overcome cancer. Although he was declared cured, Cauwenberghs did not return to the spotlight.

Cauwenberghs died of complications from heart failure at a Veurne hospital, on 23 April 2025, at the age of 78.

== Filmography ==
- De Witte van Zichem (1980)
- Vrijdag (1980)
- De Vlaschaard (1983)
- Zware Jongens (1984)
- Paniekzaaiers (1986)
- Congo Express (1986)
- Crazy Love (1987)
- Hector (1987)
- Boerenpsalm (1989)
- Het Spook van Monniksveer (1989)
- A Helping Hand (1989)
- Koko Flanel (1990)
- Bunker (1991)
- Boys (1992)
- Plop en de Kabouterschat (1999)
- Plop in de Wolken (2000)
- Plop en de Toverstaf (2003)
- Plop en Kwispel (2004)
- Plop en het Vioolavontuur (2005)
- Plop in de Stad (2006)
- Plop en de Pinguin (2007)
- Plop en de Kabouterbaby (2009)
- Plop wordt Kabouterkoning (2012)

== Television work ==
- Rogier van ter Doest (1976)
- Panorama (1980)
- Liegebeest (1983-87)
- Merlina (1983)
- Geschiedenis Mijner Jeugd (1983)
- Adriaan Brouwer (1986)
- Carlos & Co (1987-89)
- Langs de Kade (1988-93)
- Oei Jacques (1989)
- Postbus X (1990)
- Meester, Hij Begint Weer! (1985-1990)
- De Bossen van Vlaanderen (1991)
- RIP (1992-93)
- Kats & Co (1994)
- Buiten De Zone (1996)
- Thuis (1995-96)
- Binnen Zonder Bellen (1996)
- Familie Backeljau (1995-97)
- De Vermeiren Explosion (2001)
- Brussel Nieuwstraat (2000-02)
- Big & Betsy (2000-02)
- Samson en Gert (1999-2003)
- Verschoten en Zoon (2005)
- Urbain (2005)
- Booh! (2005)
- De Kavijaks (2006)
- En Daarmee Basta (2008)
- Aspe (2009)
- 2 Straten Verder (2009)
- De Kotmadam (2005-10)
- Musical: Robin Hood (2013)
- Lang Leve (2013)
