= Zeppos =

Zeppos may refer to:

== People ==
- Nicholas Zeppos (army general), Greek army general in the 1930s.
- Nicholas S. Zeppos (born 1954), American lawyer and university administrator.

== Other ==
- Captain Zeppos, a Belgian children's television program in the 1960s.

== See also ==
- Zeppo Marx
- The Zeppo
