= Ward de Ravet =

Belgian actor

- Born: Edward Philippe Pierre De Ravet; 1 June 1924; Antwerp, Belgium
- Died: 6 March 2013 (aged 88); Zandhoven, Belgium
- Occupation: Actor

Edward Philippe Pierre "Ward" de Ravet (1 June 1924 – 6 March 2013) was a Belgian actor. His wife was Belgian stage and television actress Fanny Winkler.

== Death ==
Ward de Ravet, as he was universally known, died on 6 March 2013, aged 88. He had been in a nursing home in Zandhoven.

== Filmography ==
Year	Title	Role	Notes
1957	Wat doen we met de liefde?	Wim	
1964	Kapitein Zeppos	Baral	6 episodes
1965	Johan en de Alverman	Oom Willem	Recurring
1968	De vijanden	Amerikaanse militair	
1971	Mira	Rijkswachter	
1971	Malpertuis	Doucedame	Uncredited
1973	Love Comes Quietly	Menno Dijkstra	
1974	Help! The Doctor Is Drowning	Meneer Pastoor	
1974	Golden Ophelia	Kommissaris	
1975	De laatste trein	man in wheelchair	
1975	De dwaze lotgevallen van Sherlock Jones	Chef	
1976	De danstent	Flup	
1976	Alle dagen feest		
1976	The Arrival of Joachim Stiller	Wiebrand Zijlstra	
1977	Slisse & Cesar	Slisse	12 episodes
1977	Dokter Vlimmen	Pastoor	
1977	Soldier of Orange	Resistance Leader #1	
1977	Rubens	Abraham Janssens	
1979	Slachtvee	Duprez	
1982	Het Beest	Karlsen	
1982	Maria Danneels (of het leven dat we droomden)	Vader	
1984	John the Fearless	Ridder Kortenak	Voice
1987	Het Pleintje	Deken	1 episode
1991	De Bossen van Vlaanderen	Casimir Brulot	TV movie
2000	Plop in de wolken	Kabouter Knap	
