= Pol Goossen =

Flemish actor (born 1949)

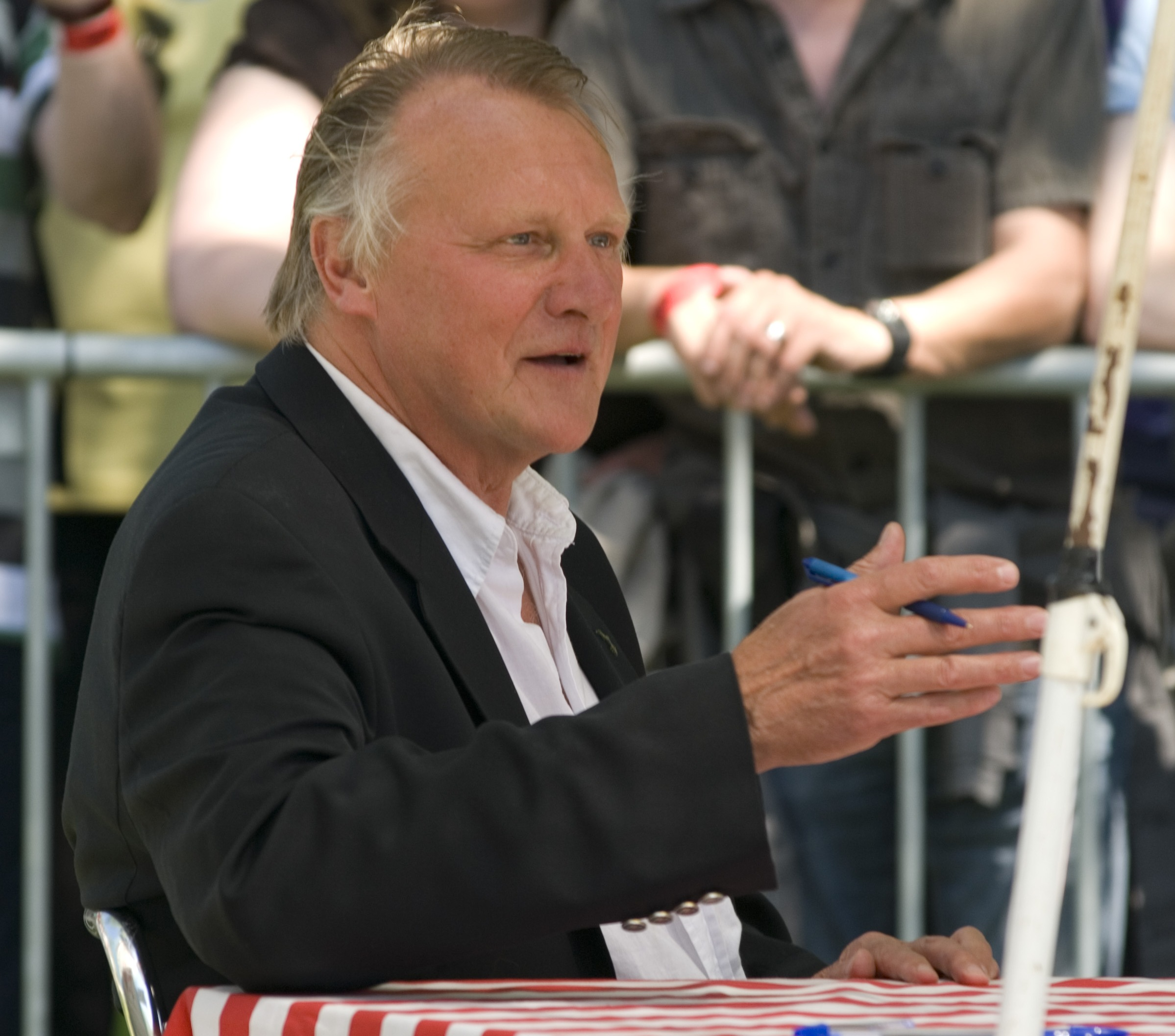
- Pol Goossen at Thuisdag 2010
- Born: 22 October 1949 (age 76); Lier, Belgium
- Occupation: Actor
- Known for: Thuis
- Website: www.polgoossen.be

Pol Goossen (born 22 October 1949 in Lier, Belgium) is a Flemish film and television actor.

He is known for playing the character of Frank Bomans in over 5894 episodes of the Belgium soap opera Thuis, a role he acts since start of the series in December 1995. Goossen called the character the absolute opposite of his personality. He, Annick Segal, Marleen Merckx and Leah Thys are the only current main cast members to appear in the series since the first season and he is the only one to appear without a break. He also played Manfred Stein, the German doppelganger of Frank in season 11 and in the first episode of season 12 who was a criminal who tried to use Frank for his own crimes but was betrayed by his partner Bonnie and shot dead in the season 11 finale. This storyline from season 11 is considered one of the most unique and memorable of the series.

Goossen also appeared in guest roles in other TV series which includes Het Pleintje (1987), Alfa Papa Tango (1992), Lili & Marleen (1994), Wittekerke (1995), Nonkel Jef (1995–1996), Familie Backeljau (1996), Heterdaad (1996), Windkracht 10 (1997), W817 (1999), Recht op Recht (2001), Rupel (2004), Witse (2004), Mega Mindy (2006) en Goesting (2010). He guest starred in two episodes of F.C. De Kampioenen, in episode 1 in 1990 as fire chief Fons, and in episode 61 in 1995 as Diederik Legrand.

His film roles includes Het Beest (1982), Walhalla (1995), Dief! (1998), Alias (2002), Team Spirit 2 (2003), the Kabouter Plop-film Plop in de stad (2006) en Ben X (2007)

He is a member of the professional theatre company Paljas Produkties.

He is married with actress Annemarie Picard who played Agnes Raemaeckers-Vervust, meester Rochussen and Martha in Thuis (1996, 2002, 2011–2012)

== Filmography ==
=== Television ===
- De piramide (1981)
- Cello en contrabas (1982) as Kelner
- Merlina (episode Het spookvliegtuig, 1984) as Sportvlieger Vlinders
- Het Pleintje (2 episodes in season 2, 1987) as Deurwaarder
- Abraham en Samuel (1989) as Abraham
- Het spook van Monniksveer (1989) as Agent
- Omtrent Marleen (1989) as Agent
- F.C. De Kampioenen (1 episode, 1990) as fire chief Fons
- De weduwnaar (1991)
- De bossen van Vlaanderen (1991) as Veldwachter
- Commissaris Roos (1 episode, 1992) as Guido
- Alfa Papa Tango (1 episode, 1992)
- Bex & Blanche (1 episode, 1993) as Boer Van der Stappen
- Langs de kade (1 episode, 1993)
- Gaston Berghmans Show (1994)
- Lili & Marleen (1 episode, 1994) as Marcel
- Het park (1 episode, 1994) as Agent 1
- F.C. De Kampioenen (1 episode, 1995) as Diederik Legrand
- Wittekerke (1995) as Rob Buytaert
- Niet voor publikatie (1 episode, 1995) as Andre Maas
- Nonkel Jef (21 episodes, 1995–1996) as Lange Fons Van Bael
- Thuis (episodes 1–ongoing, 1995–present) as Frank Bomans
- Oog in oog (1995) as Rudy Rombouts
- Editie (1995) as Dokter
- Buiten de Zone (1 episode, 1996) as Man in bank
- De Familie Backeljau (1 episode 1996) as Pedro Pirelli
- Heterdaad (1 episode, 1996) as Oswald Nys
- Windkracht 10 (2 episodes, 1997) as Krijgsauditeur Kolonel De Ribeaucourt
- Over de liefde (1 episode, 1998) as Ronny
- W817 (1 episode, 1999) as Frank Bomans
- Recht op Recht (1 episode, 2001) as Coach
- Oei! (2001)
- Thuis Special: Afscheid Van Florke (2004) as Frank Bomans
- De wet volgens Milo (1 episode, 2004) as Gaston
- Rupel (1 episode, 2004) as Claessen
- Witse (1 episode, 2004) as Marc Deleu
- Thuis (episodes 1910 & 1960–2026, 2005–2006) as Manfred Stein
- Mega Mindy (1 episode, 2006) as Boef Verdraff
- Zonde van de zendtijd (2009) as Frank
- Goesting (1 episode, 2010) as Louis, Seynaeve
- Amateurs (1 episode, 2014) as Pol Goossen

=== Film ===
- Het beest (1982) as Inspector
- De Leeuw van Vlaanderen (film, 1985)
- Walhalla (1995) as Football fan
- Dat ben ik (1996)
- Melt-down (1998)
- Dief! (1998) as Commissaris Gino Smits
- Alias (2002) as Albert
- Team Spirit 2 (2003) as Vandenbergh
- Plop in de stad (2006) as Busdriver
- Ben X (2007) as Father
- Lang Zullen Ze Leven (2008) as Bert
