= Bea Van der Maat =

Belgian singer, television presenter and actress (1960–2023)

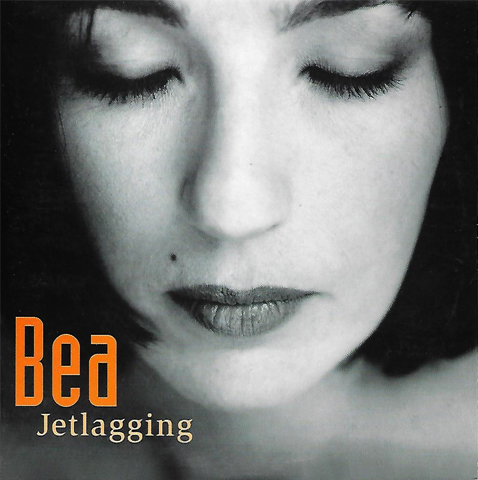
- Born: Béatrice Marguerite Van der Maat; 15 November 1960; Ghent, Belgium
- Died: 27 July 2023 (aged 62); Leuven, Belgium
- Occupations: Singer; television presenter; actress
- Spouse: Jan Biesemans
- Children: 2
- Musical career
- Genres: New wave
- Instrument: Vocals

Béatrice Marguerite Van der Maat (15 November 1960 – 27 July 2023) was a Belgian singer, television presenter and actress.

== Biography ==
Van der Maat grew up in a family of five girls. The family often moved because of their father's work. They lived in Itterbeek, Sint-Amandsberg (Oostakker), Tienen and Diest, among others. Van der Maat studied Dutch-English regency.

As a singer, Van der Maat started in 1982 with Chow-Chow until that group was disbanded in 1985. Shortly afterwards she became lead singer with Won Ton Ton, which became known with their hit song I Lie and I Cheat in 1988. She cited her 1996 solo album Thin Skinned as her personal musical highlight. She also sang as a guest singer with the LSP band and in 2005, she sang with The Belpop Bastards with, among others, Kloot Per W. In 2010, she did a musical tour with Guy Swinnen, after which she stopped singing completely.

Van der Maat started as a television presenter in 1989 when the new channel VTM asked her to present the music program 10 om te zien with Willy Sommers. In 1994, Yasmine took over from her. This was followed by the animal program Dag Coco and the television game show Studio Gaga. In 1998, she presented the nature program Rare pranks on the newly founded channel Canvas. In 2021, Van der Maat appeared on television again in an episode of Winteruur on Canvas on a rare occasion. She brought the poem 'Trees' by the American poet Joyce Kilmer to express her love for nature.

In 1989, Urbanus asked Van der Maat for a leading role in Koko Flanel. Without acting experience, she was coached by Hugo Van den Berghe. In 1992, she played as false Sinterklaas in Dag Sinterklaas, and in 1994, she appeared in a supporting role for the comedy film Max.

== Personal life and death ==
In 2004, Van der Maat taught English in the second secondary school of the Middle School in Keerbergen. She was married to Jan Biesemans, with whom she had a son and daughter. Van der Maat was a cousin of actress Mitta Van der Maat.

In June 2022, she was diagnosed with ALS. Van der Maat died by euthanasia in UZ Leuven on 27 July 2023, at the age of 62.
