= Johan en de Alverman =

Flemish children's television series

- Book cover of the series
- Genre: Children's TV series, historical adventure series
- Created by: Lo Vermeulen, Karel Jeuninckx
- Directed by: Bert Struys (footage), Senne Rouffaer (actors)
- Theme music composer: Miklós Rózsa
- Opening theme: "The Duchess of Brighton" from The V.I.P.s.
- Country of origin: Belgium
- Original language: Dutch
- No. of episodes: 16

Original release
- Network: B.R.T. (nowadays the VRT)
- Release: October 23, 1965 – June 12, 1966

Johan en de Alverman (Johan and the Alverman) was a Flemish children's TV series, broadcast on the BRT (now the VRT) from 1965 to 1966.

Together with Captain Zeppos, it is considered one of the classics of Flemish children's television. The show was very popular and has been rerun numerous times. It also achieved significant success in Italy, Germany, the Netherlands, Sweden and Norway.

== Concept ==
The story is set in 1650. A local surgeon, Johan Claeszoons, meets a strange dwarf in the forest who is unable to speak his language. After sharing some food, the dwarf becomes Johan's friend. He turns out to be an alverman, who was banished from the kingdom of Avalon for being too curious. He is only allowed to return to his people when he can bring something of value to the entire kingdom. The help of his magical flute and ring, Fafiforniek, aid him.

Later in the story, Johan meets Rosita, the beautiful daughter of Don Cristobal de Bobadilla, and falls in love with her. However, he must contend with her suitor, the evil Guy de Sénancourt as well as Cristobal, who sends his Native American servant Otorongo after him.

== Cast ==
- Johan Claeszoon: Frank Aendenboom
- De Alverman: Jef Cassiers
- Don Cristobal de Bobadilla: Cyriel Van Gent
- Rosita de Bobadilla: Rosemarie Bergmans
- Otorongo: Dolf De Winter
- Guy de Sénancourt: Alex Cassiers
- Oom Willem: Ward de Ravet
- Tante Liezelotje: Fanny Winkler
- Ome Ben: Vic Moeremans
- Cipolla: Walter Moeremans
- Pietro: Jos Mahu
- Simone: Chris Lomme
- De Baljuw: Marcel Hendrickx
- Farmer Janus: Jan Reussens
- Marquis: Roger Bolders
- Knight servant: Raymond Bossaerts
- Alberic van Avalon: Robert Maes
- Elf: Marilou Mermans
- Royal servant: Jacky Morel
- 'Guard: Jaak Van Hombeek

== Background ==
Originally, Luc Phillips was to play the Alverman, but he had other commitments, so Jef Cassiers replaced him.

The actors Aendenboom and Bergmans became a couple in real life during the recordings.

The show was recorded in several historical or nature resorts in Belgium, including in Gaasbeek, the Caves of Han-sur-Lesse, Brussels, Orp-Jauche and Bokrijk.

The story was also adapted into a series of novels.

The theme music, "The Duchess of Brighton" was taken from the film The V.I.P.s (1962) and composed by Miklós Rózsa.

The success of Johan en de Alverman inspired the Dutch children's TV series Floris, which is also a costume drama.
