= K3 en het ijsprinsesje =

2006 film

K3 en het IJsprinsesje
- K3 En Het Ijsprinsesje DVD cover
- Directed by: Indra Siera
- Screenplay by: Hans Bourlon; Gert Verhulst
- Produced by: Anja Van Mense
- Starring: Karen Damen; Kristel Verbeke; Kathleen Aerts; Peter Faber; Urbanus; Mimoun Ouled Radi
- Cinematography: Jan Mestdagh
- Music by: Peter Jules Gillis; Alain Vande Putte; Miguel Wiels
- Production company: Studio 100
- Distributed by: Kinepolis Film Distribution (Belgium); Independent Films (Netherlands)
- Release dates: 19 July 2006 (Belgium); 20 July 2006 (Netherlands)
- Countries: Belgium; Netherlands
- Language: Dutch

K3 en het IJsprinsesje (English: K3 and the Little Ice Princess) is a 2006 Flemish pre-teen adventure film written by Hans Bourlon and Gert Verhulst, directed by Indra Siera, and starring the women of the K3 girl group in a sequel to their 2004 film K3 en het Magisch Medaillon. The sequel was shown on Zappelin, SBS6, Ketnet, Kindernet and RTL Telekids.

== Plot ==
King Flurkentijn (Peter Faber) invites the members of K3 (Karen Damen, Kristel Verbeke, Kathleen Aerts) to fairyland to sing for Princess Fleur (Laurien Poelemans) because he hopes that they can cheer her up. But as the princess has been cursed by an evil wizard (Urbanus), the trio are unable to. They decide to undo the curse, and learn that they need to find out the wizard's real name within 24 hours in order to cancel it. While seeking his name, they interact with fairy tale figures, including Snow White (Sasha Rosen), Hansel & Gretel (Florian Slangen and Kato Bijteboer), Little Red Riding Hood (Mathilde Geysen) and Alladin (Mimoun Ouled Radi).

== Cast ==
- Karen Damen as herself (K3)
- Kristel Verbeke as herself (K3)
- Kathleen Aerts as herself (K3)
- Peter Faber as King Flurkentijn
- Urbanus as Wizard Hatsjie
- Mimoun Ouled Radi as Alladin
- Annemarie Picard as Queen Bonbonia
- Carry Tefsen as Witch
- Stany Crets as Lak
- Ben Segers as Kei
- Sasha Rosen as Snow White
- Laurien Poelemans as Princess Fleur
- Nicky Langley as Helena
- Katerine Avgoustakis as Lady in waiting 1
- Nicole Oerlemans as Lady in waiting 2
- Bianca Vanhaverbeke as Lady in waiting 3
- Serge de Marre as Palace guard
- Thomas van Hulle as Prince Arne
- Charles van der Aa as Little Princess
- Mathilde Geysen as Little Red Riding Hood
- Florian Slangen & Kato Bijteboer as Hansel & Gretel
- Frank Aendenboom as voice of frog
- Patrick Mallard as frog's puppeteer
- Suzy the Elephant
- Harrt Mallard as elephant trainer.

== Soundtrack ==
The theme song "Trouwen" was not the only original K3-song used in the film. Other songs were "Cake en Chocolade" and "Betoverd" (Cursed).

All songs were composed by Peter Jules Gillis and performed by K3.

1. "Trouwen"
2. "Etiquetterap"
3. "Cake met chocolade"
4. "Meisje in de Spiegel"
5. "Betoverd"

== Reception ==
Cinemagazine praised the film, writing that in being intended for pre-teen audiences, the women of K3 kept the viewers in suspense throughout the film, keeping the film magical and fun to watch. The review concluded by saying the performances "are good and fun to watch. But the magical atmosphere created by the decor, costumes and editing is absolutely fantastic!"
