= Ann Petersen =

Belgian actress

- Petersen in 1996
- Born: 22 June 1927; Wuustwezel, Belgium
- Died: 11 December 2003 (aged 76); Opwijk, Belgium
- Occupation: Actress

Ann Petersen (22 June 1927 – 11 December 2003) was a Belgian actress.

She was especially noted for her roles in Home Sweet Home, Pauline & Paulette, the children's serial Samson & Gert, and Captain Zeppos, Wij, Heren van Zichem and Thuis.

== Selected filmography ==
- Mira (1971)
- Home Sweet Home (1973)
- Rubens (1977)
- Vrijdag (1980)
- John the Fearless (1984)
- Hector (1987)
- The Sacrament (1989)
- Koko Flanel (1990)
- Manneken Pis (1995)
- Pauline and Paulette (2001)
