= Hector (1987 film) =

- Directed by: Stijn Coninx
- Story by: Stijn Coninx; Urbanus; Walter van den Broeck
- Produced by: Erwin Provoost; Jos van der Linden
- Starring: Urbanus; Sylvia Millecam; Frank Aendenboom
- Distributed by: MMG
- Release date: 1987
- Country: Belgium
- Language: Dutch

Hector is a Belgian comedy-drama film, directed by Stijn Coninx starring Urbanus and Sylvia Millecam. The movie was released in 1987 and was the most successful Flemish movie regarding the number of visitors in Belgian movie theatres until 1990. It was beaten by Koko Flanel, another movie with Stijn Coninx as director and Urbanus as the main actor.

== Story ==
Hector was brought into an orphanage as a child to cure his chicken pox. He was never picked up by his parents. 35 years later Hector is still there, surrounded by children who are still his playmates. The orphanage is run by nuns who never introduced Hector to real life and maturity.

His life changes when he is remembered by an aunt named Ella. She and her husband Achiel run a baker's shop and are searching for a cheap worker. Ella is too busy with the rehearsals of a romantic theatre play where she has the main female role. A prominent Hollywood director will attend the play, and Ella dreams of becoming a famous actress. Their son Jos is only interested in bicycle contests. Achiel suffers from high blood pressure, and his marriage with Ella is not that successful.

Furthermore, he suspects Ella is having an affair with Gregoire, the father of Swa. Swa is Jos' biggest competitor in bicycle racing. Gregoire also obtained the main male role in the romantic play.

Hector seems not to be as clumsy as he looks. He makes clever inventions, such as automatising the baker's shop where many objects (such as a mixing machine, egg beater, etc.) are now powered by a bicycle driven by Jos.

Ella flirts with Hector hoping Achiel notices this so he will pay more attention to her. Instead of Achiel, this is noticed by Gregoire, who gets into an affair with Ella. Ella soothes Gregoire by telling Hector is just an immature big child. Gregoire does not believe Ella and considers Hector as a rival.

Some time later, Jos is participating in a bicycle race, which he is about to win. Due to the interaction with Hector, Jos falls just before the finish resulting Swa winning the course. Achiel is upset and sends Hector back to the orphanage. On the evening of Ella's play, Hector admits to the children he is in love with her. The children convince him to escape.

Hector finds a way to escape and runs to the theatre. He arrives just before the play ends, where "Gregoire" has to kiss "Ella" to promise her eternal love. Hector dresses up as a noble count, sets foot on the stage, and claims Ella. This ends up in a hilarious improvisation where Hector and Gregoire fight their personal vendetta, while the audience thinks this is part of the play.

Hector wins the battle, and Ella answers his love. Achiel, also in the audience, is so jealous he gets a heart attack and dies in the theatre.

Sometime after the funeral, Ella gets a letter from the director: she got a role in a movie and is about to leave for Hollywood. Hector is depressed when it turns out it was not Ella who promised eternal love but the character she played. While Hector walks back to the orphanage, a taxi is driving Ella to the airport. There she realizes she is in love with Hector and asks the taxi driver to pick up Hector.

== Cast ==
- Urbanus - Hector
- Sylvia Millecam - Ella Mattheusen
- Frank Aendenboom - Achiel Mattheusen
- Herbert Flack - Gregoire Ghijssels
- Marc Van Eeghem - Jos Mattheusen
- Hein van der Heijden - Swa Ghijssels
- Ann Petersen - Nun Abdis
- Cas Baas - Doctor
- Maja van den Broecke - Ikebana
- Chris Cauwenberghs - Bicycle shop owner

== Reception ==
As well as being the most successful Flemish film in Belgium it was also the fourth highest-grossing film in the Netherlands for the year.
