= TV Belgiek =

Belgian TV comedy sketch show (2006–2008)

- Series screenshot
- Genre: Sketch show, animated series
- Voices of: Dimitri Oosterlynck; Stéphanie Coerten; Dirk Denoyelle; Julien Vrebos; André Lamy; Angélique Leleux
- Country of origin: Belgium
- Original language: French
- No. of seasons: 2

Production
- Running time: 2-3 minutes

Original release
- Network: RTL-TVI
- Release: 20 October 2006 – 1 April 2008

TV Belgiek is a satirical animated series about Brussels and Belgian politics and royalty. It was created by André Lamy. Produced by MagicWorlds, the series treats contemporary issues not older than 1 week. The episodes are about 2 to 3 minutes long and can be viewed weekly on the website of TV Belgiek.

MagicWorlds practices a unique animation style which returns in other series as well such as Celebville and Earth Predator. These series are also based on contemporary issues such as celebrity life and international politics.

== History ==
TV Belgiek made its debut on the Internet in June 2006 and immediately became a hit. In March 2007 RTL-TVI, a channel in the French-speaking part of Belgium, took over the series and broadcast TV Belgiek daily during the electoral campaigns. Also the episodes on TV became a great success. TV Belgiek now has a market share of 29% and has up to 450,000 viewers daily. TV Belgiek is currently starting its fourth season.

== Cast and writers ==
The voices are mainly done by Dirk Denoyelle, André Lamy and Angélique Leleux. The scripts are written by MagicWorlds founder Dimitri Oosterlynck, Marcel Sel and Jean Bart.
