= Dennis P. =

- Theatrical release poster
- Directed by: Pieter Kuijpers
- Starring: Edo Brunner; Nadja Hüpscher; Willeke van Ammelrooy
- Production companies: Pupkin Film; BNN
- Distributed by: RCV Film Distribution
- Release date: 15 March 2007
- Country: Netherlands
- Language: Dutch

Dennis P. is a 2007 Dutch film directed by Pieter Kuijpers. Based on the book Aan de Haal by Gijsbert Termaat and Tjerk de Vries, the film is about 25-year-old Dennis Phrommer, a former employee of diamond trade company Gassan Diamonds in Amsterdam who committed a spectacular theft of 8137 diamonds, together 3,422.9 carats (684.58 g), and other jewelry, with a value of €10 million, from his employer.

== Plot ==
Dennis (Edo Brunner) is in love with prostitute Tiffany (Nadja Hüpscher). He is not so interested in sex, but pays her to keep him company, and gives her expensive presents. He gets the money from repeatedly stealing diamonds from his employer Globus Diamonds. In view of an upcoming investigation into the missing diamonds Dennis fears he cannot go on like this. Instead he decides to steal one more time, but now a lot. He succeeds and leaves most diamonds with Tiffany's parents, who will hide them. He and Tiffany go to Mexico: on one hand Dennis flees the country, on the other hand he fulfills Tiffany's wish to go to that country. However, they have to take separate flights: due to the overbooking of their flight the departure is after the theft is discovered, therefore Dennis has to acquire a false passport.

In Mexico it turns out that Tiffany has a lover there whom she is going to marry. The fact that, on top of that, he is a policeman, is no complication, he knows about the theft, but will not report it. Anyway, Dennis is disappointed, and returns to the Netherlands. On arrival he visits his parents' house, where he hears from his mother (Willeke van Ammelrooy) that his father (John Leddy) has just died. His mother strongly disapproves of the theft and refuses the money Dennis gives her, but her father was more positive, with the motto "It is better to regret what you have done than to regret what you did not do". First Dennis plans not to attend the funeral because he would likely be caught by the police, but he goes anyway and, after that, turns himself in. His mother is at last proud of him.
