= Zombibi =

- Theatrical release poster
- Directed by: Martijn Smits; Erwin van den Eshof
- Written by: Tijs van Marle
- Produced by: Paul Ruven
- Starring: Yahya Gaier; Gigi Ravelli; Mimoun Ouled Radi; Sergio Hasselbaink; Uriah Arnhem; Noel Deelen
- Cinematography: Joost van Herwijnen
- Edited by: Joost van de Wetering
- Music by: Martijn Schimmer; Matthijs Kieboom
- Production companies: Talent United Film & TV; Launch Works; RTL Entertainment
- Distributed by: A-Film Distribution
- Release date: 16 February 2012
- Running time: 90 minutes
- Country: Netherlands
- Language: Dutch
- Box office: $302,777 (Netherlands)

Zombibi (also released as Kill Zombie!) is a 2012 Dutch splatter comedy film directed by Martijn Smits and Erwin van den Eshof, written by Tijs van Marle, and starring Yahya Gaier, Gigi Ravelli, Mimoun Ouled Radi, Sergio Hasselbaink, Uriah Arnhem, and Noel Deelen as survivors of a zombie attack in Amsterdam-West.

== Plot ==
Aziz works in an office building in Amsterdam and is unhappy with both his job and his boss. He has recently started dating his dream girl, Tess. His boss, envious of Aziz's relationship with Tess, uses the frequent calls from Aziz's brother Mo as a pretext to fire him. With nowhere else to go, Aziz reluctantly joins Mo at a pool party. There, Mo's carelessness leads to a fight, resulting in Aziz, Mo, Jeffrey, Nolan (incompetent bouncers), and Joris (a thief) being jailed. Except for Aziz, they all hit on Kim, a tough cop, who then tasers Mo and Jeffrey after they talk back to her. Later, alarms sound, and the building loses power. Mo initially dismisses this as a scare tactic, but when their cell doors open, they find the police station in ruins. They leave out of curiosity and are attacked by zombies; Kim saves them, and they return to the station.

Television broadcasts reveal that a Russian space probe, contaminated with a green slime, has caused the residents of Amsterdam-West to turn into zombies. Aziz becomes worried when he sees that the probe crashed into his office building, and when he receives a call for help from Tess, he insists that they go there to rescue her. The others refuse and instead suggest that they go to a designated shelter. After they loot a sporting goods store for equipment, Aziz sets off on his own to rescue Tess, and Kim reluctantly accompanies him, equally impressed and annoyed with his dedication to Tess. They do not get far before they are swamped by zombies, and they rejoin the rest of the group, who have accidentally killed Ben Saunders. The group retreats to a chop shop, where the mechanics demonstrate that the green slime is an energy source. When the mechanics turn into zombies, the group splits up: Aziz and Kim set off to rescue Tess, and Joris convinces the others to rob a bank.

Joris double-crosses the others and leaves with the money, and a zombie bites Nolan. When Nolan begins vomiting green slime, he requests they kill him; after several unsuccessful attempts to bludgeon Nolan to death, they abandon him. Both Mo and Tess call Aziz and ask for help. Caught between his brother and his girlfriend, Aziz decides to first help his brother. Kim and Aziz rescue Jeffrey and Mo, but they end up stranded at a playground. They are rescued by the Barachi brothers, who, in a video game sequence, defeat the zombies and then leave. When the group arrives at the shelter, soldiers refuse to assist Aziz in rescuing Tess, and he steals a truck. The others join him, and they set off for the office building. Jeffrey, now armed with a minigun, holds off the zombie hordes while Aziz, Mo, and Kim work their way up the building, only to find out that Tess was already rescued by a former lover.

Furious at the pointlessness, Kim leaves on her own and randomly encounters Tess, who has now transformed into a zombie. At the same time, Aziz and Mo reach the building's roof, where a Russian commando explains his plan to blow up the building. Before he can, he is bitten, turns into a zombie, and bites Mo, who decides to stay behind and use the detonator. Aziz finds Kim just as she beheads Tess, and Aziz hurriedly explains about the explosives. Jeffrey, who has climbed the entire building while toting his minigun, follows them back down the staircase. As zombies swarm Mo, he triggers the explosives, and the building collapses; Aziz, Kim, and Jeffrey escape with the help of the Barachi brothers. When they triumphantly return to the shelter, they discover the zombified soldiers already cocooned into vampires sucking blood from their victims. Aziz says that he hates vampires, as he and his team prepare for another fight.

== Cast ==
- Yahya Gaier as Aziz
- Gigi Ravelli as Kim
- Sergio Hasselbaink as Jeffrey
- Mimoun Ouled Radi as Mo
- Uriah Arnhem as Nolan
- Noel Deelen as Joris
- Nadia Poeschmann as Tess
- Carlo Boszhard as Jan de Hoop
- Yes-R as Jamal Barachi
- Ilias Ojja as Kadir Barachi
- Kees Boot as Bakels
- Wart Kamps as Pieter
- Tim Kamps as Stijn
- Loek Peters as Ruben
- Michiel Romeyn as Sergei
- Edo Brunner as Mammut
- Remy Bonjasky as Rico
- Ben Saunders as himself

== Release ==
Zombibi was released on 16 February 2012 in the Netherlands, where it grossed $302,777.

=== Home media ===
The film was released on DVD and Blu-ray in the Netherlands on 24 May 2012. It was released on DVD in the UK on 12 September 2012, and in the United States on 10 June 2014.

== Reception ==
Paul Mount of Starburst rated it 7/10 stars and called it "delightfully daffy fun". Adam Tyner of DVD Talk rated it 2.5/5 stars and wrote, "Kill Zombie! tries to mimic Wright's motions as best it can but never approaches anything close to those same heights." Mac McEntire of DVD Verdict wrote that it "has some decent laughs" but "retreads what other filmmakers have done". Keri O'Shea of Brutal As Hell wrote that film "goes the extra mile in terms of splatter" but is not groundbreaking.
