= Julien Vrebos =

Belgian television and film director (1947–2022)

Julien Vrebos (31 May 1947 – 14 October 2022) was a Belgian television and film director from Brussels. At the Joseph Plateau Awards 1998 he won the award for best film director.

== Life and career ==
Vrebos was born in Elsene on 31 May 1947. In 1998, Vrebos made his first movie Le bal masqué. It included the attacks of the Bende van Nijvel. With this movie he became the best movie director at the Joseph Plateau Awards 1998. In 2003 followed The Emperor's Wife, and in 2004 De Garnalenpelster, after a book of Nilgün Yerli.

Vrebos also made television programmes and paid attention to social aspects. In 2007 his "De 8" was broadcast, a documentary soap about eight students of the SIBA school in Aarschot. In 2010, his documentary soap Kukeleku was published at één.

Around Christmas in 2010, Eén broadcast his trilogy programme Onder de sterren (English: Under the stars), in which the living environment of the Brussels homeless, the non-profit organization Chez Nous, and the occasional restaurant Zazou were shown.

Between 2006 and 2010, Vrebos cooperated on the online political satireseries TV Belgiek.

Vrebos died on 14 October 2022, at the age of 75.

== Movies ==
- 1998: Le Bal masqué
- 2003: The Emperor's Wife
- 2004: De Garnalenpelster

== Music clips ==
- The Scabs - Hard Times
