= Senne Rouffaer =

Flemish actor and film director

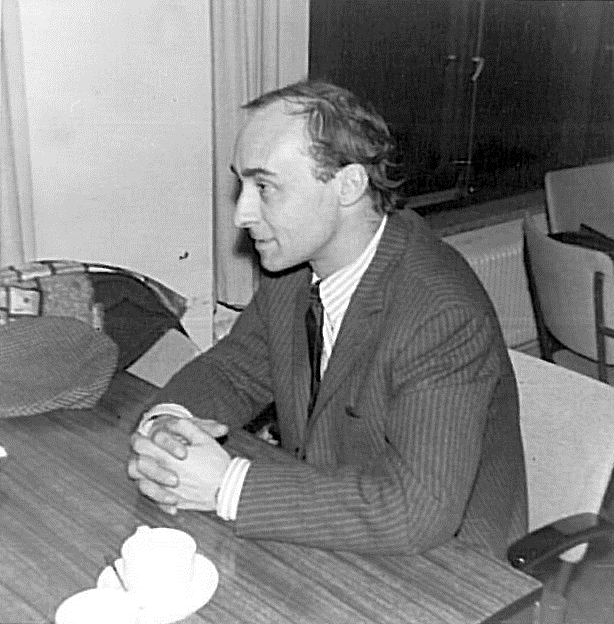
- Rouffaer (1965)
- Born: Félicien P. I. Rouffaer; 19 December 1925; Kapellen, Belgium
- Died: 14 July 2006 (aged 80)
- Occupation(s): Actor, director

Félicien P. I. (Senne) Rouffaer (19 December 1925 – 14 July 2006) was a Flemish actor and film director. One of his most successful films as a lead actor was The Man Who Had His Hair Cut Short. On television, he was chiefly known for his leading role in the mid-1960s children's adventure series, Captain Zeppos.

Rouffaer was closely associated with the Royal Flemish Theatre in Brussels, and appeared in many of their productions. In the 1970s he also became a director.

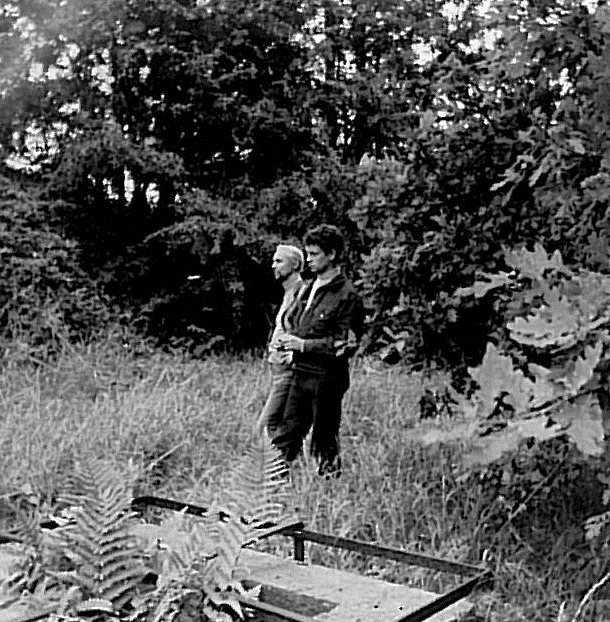
With Raymond Bossaerts, during the shooting of Captain Zeppos, 1968

== Selected filmography ==
=== Acting ===
- 1954: Atcha - Off-screen comment
- 1964-1969: Captain Zeppos (TV Series) - Jan 'Kapitein Zeppos' Stephorst
- 1966: The Man Who Had His Hair Cut Short - Govert Miereveld
- 1966: Het afscheid - Jessen, steward
- 1968: One Night... A Train - Elckerlyc
- 1968: Monsieur Hawarden - Officier
- 1969: Les gommes - Garinati
- 1972: Jonny en Jessy - Verdediger van Jonny
- 1977: Rubens - Generaal Spinola
- 1979: Woman Between Wolf and Dog - The Priest
- 1983: Brussels by Night - Onderzoeksrechter
- 1984: De schorpioen - Cutter
- 1985: Istanbul - Albert
- 1986: The van Paemel Family - Boer Van Paemel
- 1988: The Abyss - Le Cocq
- 1992: Minder dood dan de anderen - Father
- 1993: Seventh Heaven - Troyon
- 1993: Ad Fundum - Dean Schoeters
- 1995: The Flying Dutchman - Hennetaster
- 1996: Buiten De Zone (TV Series) - Peasant (uncredited)
- 2001: Verboden te zuchten - Dr. Louis Hanot

=== Directing ===
- 1964: Captain Zeppos
- 1965: Johan en de Alverman
