= Willem Ruis =

Dutch game show presenter

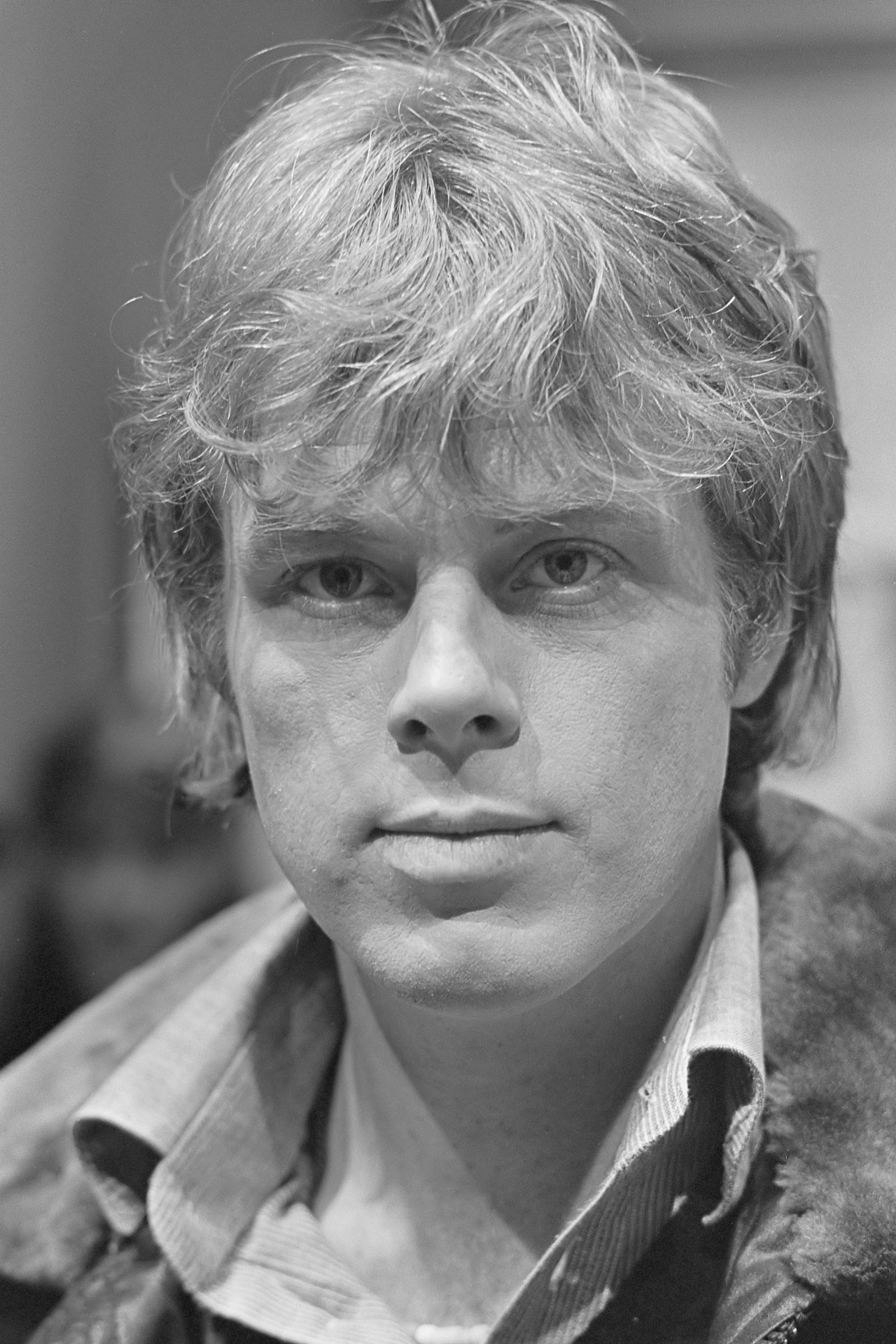
- Willem Ruis (1976)
- Born: Klaas Willem Ruis; 29 March 1945; Haarlem, Netherlands
- Died: 4 August 1986 (aged 41); Dénia, Spain
- Occupations: Television presenter, broadcaster
- Employer(s): KRO, VARA
- Known for: Dutch game show presenter

Klaas Willem Ruis (29 March 1945 in Haarlem – 4 August 1986 in Dénia) was a Dutch game show presenter. He presented the Willem Ruis Show for the KRO and the Willem Ruis Lottoshow, Vijf tegen Vijf and the Sterrenshow for the VARA. He died of a cardiac arrest during a vacation in Spain.

By 1981, Ruis moved from the KRO to the VARA, trading in his Willem Ruis Show for the Willem Ruis Lottoshow. Ruis was unhappy with his director at the KRO, who he felt did not allow him to show off all his talents, and got a contract with the VARA, which was losing viewers to the competition and was looking for a star to bolster its roster. He was paid a salary unheard of at the time (Hfl 300,000 per year, high enough to lead to questions in parliament). He also tried a career in movies, but his only appearance, in the Belgian/Dutch production Het Beest (1982), could not save the movie from becoming a "legendary flop". He explained that his career in television was not going to last forever, and his side step to cinema was a career plan for the long-term.
