= The Sacrament (1989 film) =

1989 film

- Theatrical release poster
- Directed by: Hugo Claus
- Written by: Hugo Claus
- Produced by: Paul Breuls; Patrick Conrad
- Starring: Ann Petersen
- Cinematography: Gilberto Azevedo
- Edited by: Menno Boerema
- Music by: Frédéric Devreese
- Release date: 16 November 1989
- Running time: 90 minutes
- Country: Belgium
- Language: Dutch

The Sacrament (Dutch: Het sacrament) is a 1989 Belgian comedy film directed by Belgian author Hugo Claus. It was screened in the Un Certain Regard section at the 1990 Cannes Film Festival. The film is based on Claus' own novel Omtrent Deedee and his play Interieur. The film was selected as the Belgian entry for the Best Foreign Language Film at the 62nd Academy Awards, but was not accepted as a nominee.

== Plot ==
The 1950s. A family has its annual family reunion to commemorate the anniversary of mother's death. People drink and eat heavily and after a while all restrictions are lost. Family members start venting old frustrations, discussions and tensions. Eventually one homosexual young man gets depressed and a drama escalates.

== Cast ==
- Ann Petersen as Natalie
- Carl Ridders as Claude
- Jan Decleir as Albert
- Hugo Van Den Berghe as Antoine
- An De Donder as Jeanne
- Marc Didden as Gigi
- Chris Lomme as Lotte
- Brit Alen as Tilly
- Linda Schagen Van Leeuwen as Lutje
- Blanka Heirman as Taatje
- Koen Crucke
- Frank Aendenboom as Dee Dee, the priest (uncredited)

== See also ==
- List of submissions to the 62nd Academy Awards for Best Foreign Language Film
- List of Belgian submissions for the Academy Award for Best Foreign Language Film
