= Edo Brunner =

Dutch actor and presenter

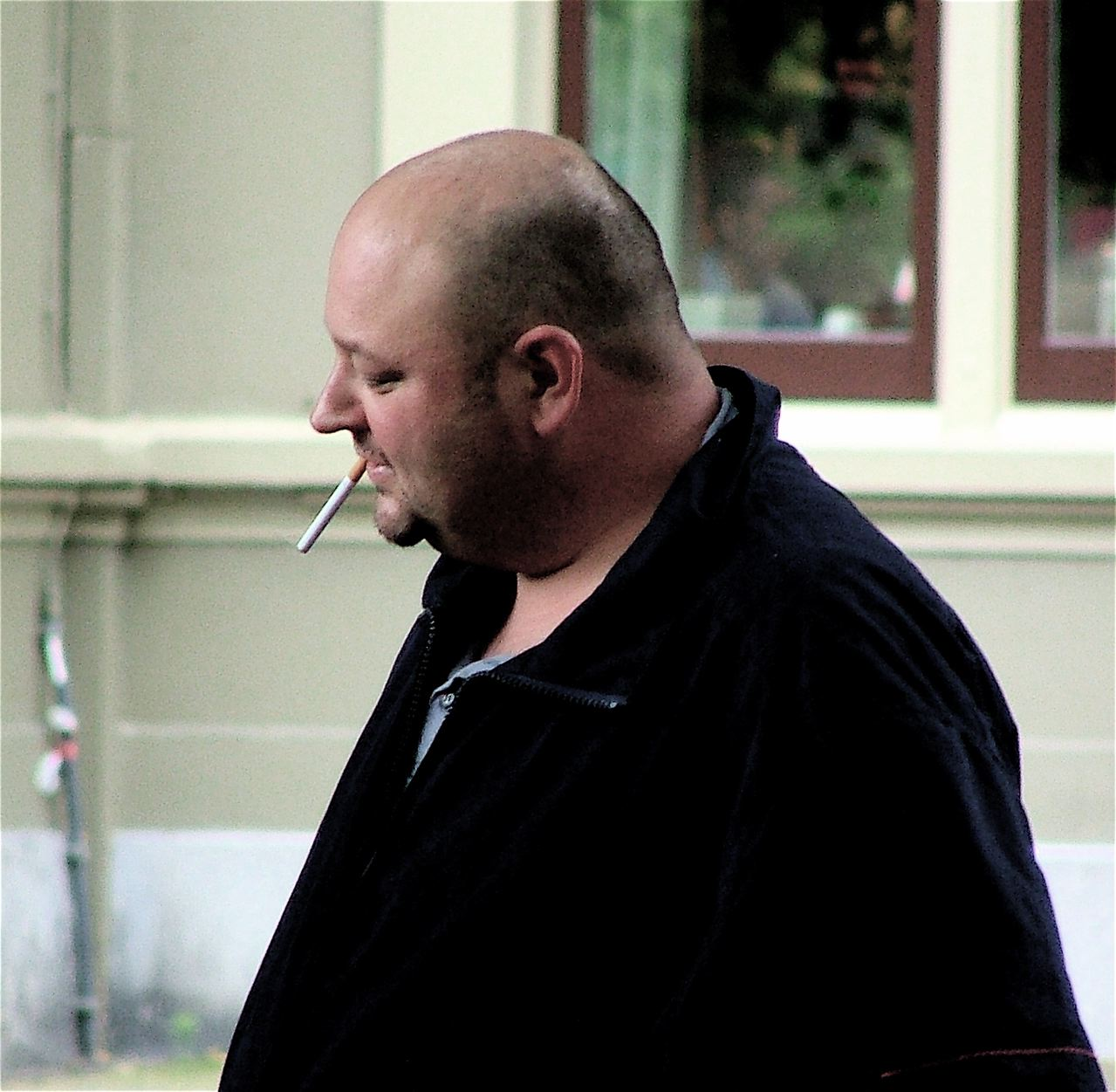
Edo Brunner

Edo Brunner (born 11 October 1970, Dubbeldam, Netherlands) is a Dutch actor and presenter.

== Filmography ==
- De Baby en de bakfiets (1997) - Willem Slootkant
- Benidorm (1999) - Sammy
- Enigma (1999)
- De Zwarte Meteoor (2000)
- Yes Nurse! No Nurse! (2002) - Bertus
- Feestje! (2004) - Bartender
- De Bode (2005) - Kees
- Bonkers (2005) - Meester
- Gruesome School Trip (2005) - Chauffeur Beentjes
- Voor een paar knikkers meer (2006) - Fat Bully
- Dennis P. (2007) - Dennis
- Wie is... de Mol? (2008) - as himself
- Zombibi (2012) - Mammut
- De Brief voor Sinterklaas (2019) - Huibert Jan
- Amsterdamned II (2025)
