= Frank Aendenboom =

Belgian actor

- Aendenboom in 2008
- Born: 24 October 1941; Antwerp, Belgium
- Died: 31 March 2018 (aged 76); Berchem, Belgium
- Occupation: Actor
- Years active: 1960-2018

Frank Aendenboom (24 October 1941 – 31 March 2018) was a Belgian stage, movie and television actor. He appeared in more than sixty films since 1960.

== Theatre career ==
Aendenboom started drama training in 1960 at the then very young Studio Herman Teirlinck, which was not officially recognized at the time. In 1964, he joined the KNS in Antwerp as an actor. There, he impressed in many great plays by Molière, Shakespeare, Chekhov and other classical playwrights. A year later, the young actor was known all over Flanders. This was due not only to his performances on stage, but especially to the youth series Johan en de Alverman, which the BRT released as a successor to Kapitein Zeppos, the television series that brought immense popularity. The series also appeared on Italian, German and Swedish television.

He experienced his breakthrough as a stage actor in 1974 with his portrayal of The Poor Killer by Czech author Pavel Kohout directed by Walter Tillemans. This allowed him to win the DR. Oscar De Gruyter prize.

== Television career ==
After his time on stage, he began to focus more and more on television for more commercial channels.

In the early 1980s, he was increasingly seen on television and in the cinema, in over 40 films, including playing the lead role of the tragic character Georges in Hugo Claus' Flemish film Vrijdag (1980). He also played the role of Robrecht van Bethune in The Lion of Flanders (1985), also directed by Hugo Claus. Other film roles included Achiel Mattheusen in Hector (1987) and Kamiel Frateur in Frits & Freddy (2010). On television, he starred, among others, in the successful series Lili en Marleen (1994-2010), in which he played the character Rik, the rag-and-bone man and owner of the house with the café on Koolkaai in Antwerp. He continued to play this role for 130 episodes. Other well-known series he starred in were Matroesjka's (2005), the series about trafficking in women, and Crimi Clowns (2012-2018). Aendenboom was also the narrator in the 1998 musical Snow White and in the 2001 musical Robin Hood. He was also the narrator in the 2011 musical Alice in Wonderland. All three productions were by Studio 100.

== Retirement ==
When he announced his retirement from his long and rich career in theatre, television and films on 3 September 2014, he did so with a certain professional detachment. He argued that acting was for him a profession like any other. In fact, he largely saw it purely as a way to make a living, and then said a final goodbye to big business and to his successful career of almost 55 years. He had problems due to diabetes, which he had suffered from for 20 years, and decades of smoking. During his final years, Aendenboom led a somewhat reclusive life. Frank Aendenboom died unexpectedly in his sleep on the night of 30–31 March 2018.

== Filmography ==
=== Movies ===
- 1962: De Wrok van Achilleus
- 1965: De Mooiste Ogen van de Wereld
- 1965: Sweet Mystery of Life
- 1966: Anna Kleiber
- 1966: Als het kindje binnenkomt
- 1966: Starkadd
- 1968: De Geboorte en Dood van Dirk Vandersteen jr.
- 1968: Hebben
- 1968: Warenar
- 1968: Het Huis met de Kamers
- 1969: Klucht van de brave Moordenaar
- 1971: Een Zachtmoedige Vrouw
- 1972: Driekoningenavond
- 1973: Harlekijn, kies je Meester
- 1974: Ter ere van...
- 1974: De Vrek
- 1974: Hobson's Dochters
- 1976: De Torenkraan
- 1976: Voorjaarsontwaken
- 1976: De Nachttrein naar Savannah Georgia
- 1977: In Perfecte Staat
- 1978: Gejaagd door de winst (of het ABC van de moderne samenleving)
- 1979: Mijn Vriend
- 1979: Thérèse Raquin
- 1980: Hellegat
- 1980: Vrijdag
- 1981: De Man die niet van Gedichten hield
- 1981: Een Familie
- 1982: La Musica
- 1982: De Waanzin van Huigen van der Goes
- 1985: De Leeuw van Vlaanderen
- 1986: Paniekzaaiers
- 1986: Het gezin van Paemel
- 1987: Skin
- 1987: Hector
- 1989: Blueberry Hill: A Love Story from the Fifties
- 1989: Het sacrament
- 1995: She Good Fighter
- 1995: Brylcream Boulevard
- 2010: Frits & Freddy
- 2013: Crimi Clowns: De Movie
- 2016: Crimi Clowns 2.0: Uitschot
- 2016: Pippa

=== Television series ===
- 1960: Het geheim van Killary Harbour
- 1961: Tijl Uilenspiegel
- 1962: Zanzibar
- 1965: Johan en de Alverman
- 1978: Dirk van Haveskerke
- 1986: Het Wassende Water
- 1987: De Dwaling
- 1991: Ramona
- 1991: De Bossen van Vlaanderen
- 1994: De Put
- 1994: Heterdaad
- 1994-1999, 2003, 2006-2007, 2009-2010: Lili en Marleen
- 1996, 2002: Wittekerke
- 2000-2002: Simsala Grimm
- 2003-2005: Hallo België!
- 2005: Russian Dolls: Sex Trade
- 2012-2017: Crimi Clowns
