= Frits and Freddy =

2010 film

- Theatrical release poster
- Directed by: Guy Goossens
- Written by: Mark Punt
- Produced by: Guy Goossens
- Starring: Tom Van Dyck; Peter Van den Begin
- Cinematography: Gerd Schelfhout
- Edited by: Alain Dessauvage
- Release date: 8 December 2010
- Running time: 89 minutes
- Country: Belgium
- Language: Belgian Dutch

Frits and Freddy (Dutch: Frits en Freddy) is a 2010 Flemish-Belgian comedy film directed by Guy Goossens. In 2013, a sequel was released, Frits & Franky (nl).

== Plot ==
Frits and Freddy Frateur make a living as door-to-door Bible salesmen, but the crisis has also hit the Bible business hard. The brothers are forced to supplement their income by stealing from the houses they visit. When they try the same with a notorious white-collar criminal shadowed around the clock by the police, things go awry.

== Cast ==
- Frank Aendenboom as Kamiel Frateur
- Peter Van den Begin as Frits Frateur
- Tom Van Dyck as Freddy Frateur
- Stijn Cole as Gino
- Damiaan De Schrijver as Leon
- Tom Dewispelaere as Patrick Somers
- Frank Focketyn as Willy Faes
- Eric Godon as Rene beurlet
- Tania Kloek as Gina Mus
- Wim Opbrouck as Carlo Mus
- Jaap Spijkers as Max Den Hamer
- Lucas Van den Eynde as Sjarel Willems
