= Vijf tegen Vijf =

Dutch television game show

- Also known as: 5 tegen 5
- Genre: Game Show
- Based on: Family Feud by Mark Goodson
- Presented by: Willem Ruis (1982-1986); Peter-Jan Rens (1992-1998); Gordon (2005-2006, 2021-2022); Winston Gerschtanowitz (2006); Carlo Boszhard (2009); Ruben Nicolai (2015)
- Narrated by: John de Mol Jr. (1982-1984); Pierre van Ostade (1984-1986); Rinie van den Elzen (1995-1998, 2005-2006)
- Country of origin: Netherlands

Production
- Running time: 40 minutes

Original release
- Network: VARA (1982-1986, 1992-1993); RTL 4 (1993-1998, 2015); Talpa/Tien (2005-2006, 2009); SBS6 (2021-2022)
- Release: 1 October 1982 – 29 July 2022

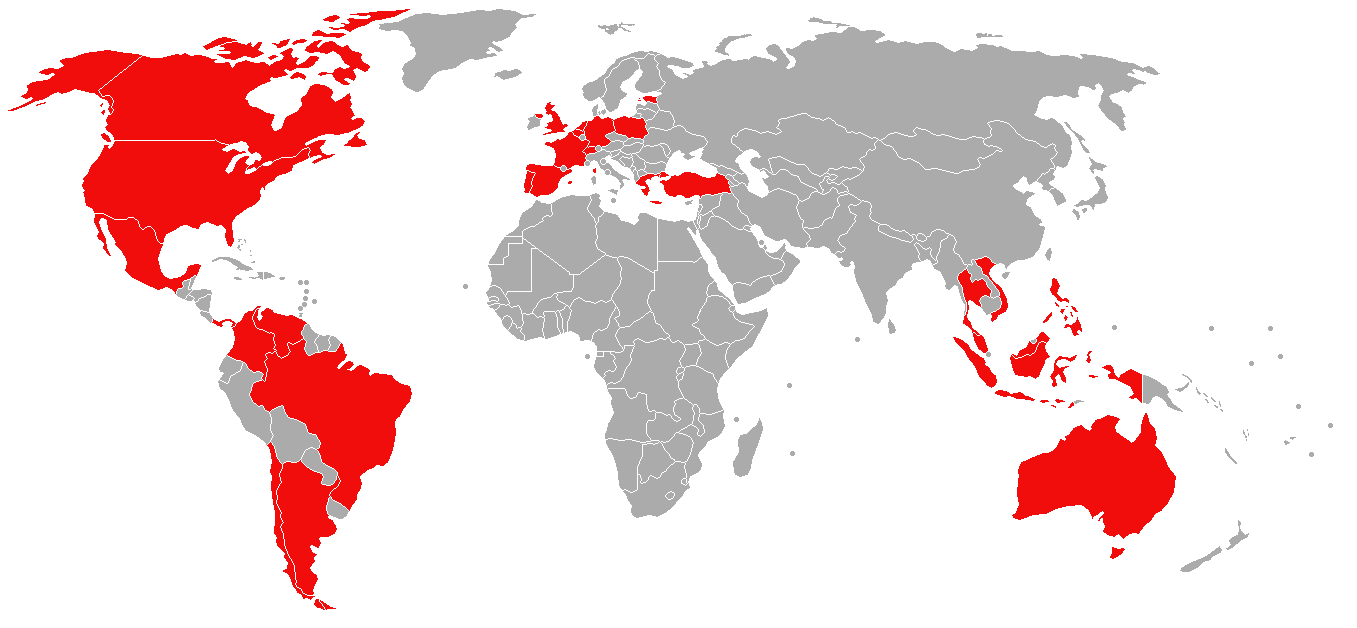
Wereldkaart met landen die hun eigen versie van Family Feud hebben

Vijf tegen Vijf (or 5 tegen 5) is a Dutch game show based on the original American format of Family Feud.

In the game, two teams consisting of five contestants play against each other and have to answer questions based on surveys taken by random people from the Netherlands. They have to guess which answer was given by most of the people involved in the survey.

It was first aired by the VARA in 1982, and the show was hosted by Willem Ruis. However, the show was canceled in 1986 because of the death of Willem Ruis. The VARA revived the series in March 1992 with Peter-Jan Rens as the host, but the show went to the commercial channel RTL 4 in 1993, because host Peter-Jan Rens also went to that channel. Later, the show was sponsored by the Lotto (which also sponsored Weekend Miljonairs). RTL 4 canceled the program in 1998 because there were problems with the rights for the format.

When the commercial channel Talpa (now Tien) started in 2005, they began airing new episodes of the show. At Talpa, the show was hosted by singer Gordon Heuckeroth from 2005 to 2006, and later in 2006, Winston Gerschtanowitz joined as the co-host. In 2008, RTL 5 began airing reruns of the Talpa episodes.

On June 6, 2009, Talpa/Tien aired a special edition hosted by Carlo Boszhard. In this episode, celebrities tried to win as much money as possible for charity.

In 2021, after being off the air for no more than six years, the show began airing on SBS6 with singer Gordon Heuckeroth returning as host.

== Rules ==
The rules are mostly the same as the other versions, except for a few minor differences. Unlike most other versions, the teams in the Dutch version don't always consist of five family members, but sometimes the teams consist of friends, colleagues, members of a sports team, etc. After four questions (three questions from 1993 to 1998), with only the last question being worth twice the value, the team in the lead won the championship.

When the show moved to RTL 4 in 1993, a bonus game was added, which was played at the beginning of the program. In it, every contestant had to answer a question. When one got the number one answer, his or her team would get ƒ1000. If they got the number two answer, the team would get ƒ500, and if they got the number 3 answer, the team would get ƒ250.

From 1982 until 1998, the top prize of the show was ƒ5000, which was awarded when a team got over 200 points in the final round. If the team failed to score 200 points, each point earned one Dutch guilder in addition to one guilder per point in the main game. If they had earned additional money in the bonus game, that money would be added to the top prize. After the RTL 4 version ended in 1998, the bonus game was not played anymore.

From 2005 and on, the top prize was €5000, which also was awarded when a team got over 200 points in the final round. On the current revival, naming all five top answers in the final doubles the jackpot to €10,000.
