= Mimoun Ouled Radi =

Dutch actor (born 2000)

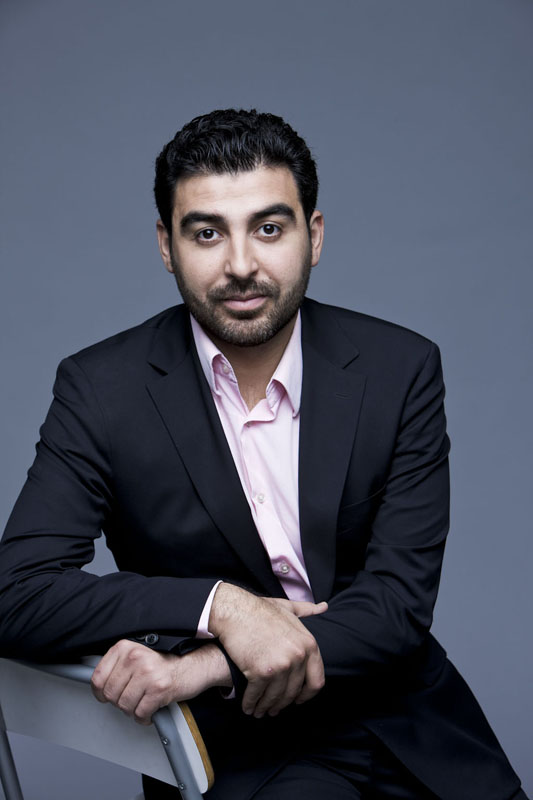
- Born: Mimoun Ouled Radi; 5 June 1977 (age 49); Amsterdam, Netherlands
- Occupation: Actor
- Years active: 2004–present

Mimoun Ouled Radi (born 5 June 1977) is a Dutch actor. He was born into a Moroccan family of seven in Amsterdam, Netherlands. He is best known for his role as 'Rachid Boussabon' in the Hush Hush Baby series.

== Acting career ==
- 2012 Zombibi, as 'Mo'
- 2010 Gangsterboys, as Achmed
- 2006–09 Shouf, Shouf! (Hush Hush), as 'Rachid Boussabon'
- 2007 Kicks, as 'Nordin'
- 2006 K3 en het ijsprinsesje (a.k.a. K3 and the Little Ice Princess, as 'Alladin'
- 2005 Koppensnellers, as 'Marokkaan Mo'
- 2004 Shouf Shouf Habibi! (Hush Hush Baby), as 'Rachid Boussabon'

== Personal life ==
Mimoun got married in May 2017 and he has a daughter named Sofia.
