= Vrijdag =

1980 film

- DVD cover
- Directed by: Hugo Claus
- Written by: Hugo Claus (play)
- Produced by: Jan van Raemdonck
- Starring: Frank Aendenboom; Kitty Courbois; Herbert Flack; Hilde Van Mieghem
- Release date: 11 December 1980
- Running time: 96 minutes
- Countries: Belgium; Netherlands
- Language: Dutch

Vrijdag (Dutch for Friday) is a 1980 Belgian-Dutch drama film directed by Hugo Claus, based on his 1969 play (a "classic" Dutch play). It was entered into the 31st Berlin International Film Festival. The film focuses on a couple, Georges and Jeanne, in a quiet Dutch countryside as they cope and catch up with each other after Georges is released from jail.

== Plot ==
Georges Vermeersch is released from prison after two years. He returns to his hometown of Marke on a Friday afternoon where he awkwardly reunites with his wife Jeanne and meets her baby daughter Elisabeth.

Prior to his arrest, Georges and Jeanne were a couple living with their daughter Christiane. Christiane always favored her father since childhood and formed a close bond with him, but this developed into incestuous feelings as she grew into her teenager years. While Jeanne is away, Christiane manages to seduce her father and they have sex. Christiane later has a boyfriend, Jacky, and the two join a gang of petty burglars. When the gang is caught by the authorities, the policemen chastise Jacky for dating the young Christiane, to which Jacky blurts out Christiane's father being her first lover.

Georges is arrested on grounds of incest, with the town testifying either for or against him, with Jeanne defending her husband. Christiane admits previously having sex with her father, and Georges is sentenced to prison. There, he spends time with Jules, a mentally ill former customs officer who was jailed for having sex with a random passerby and spends time painting while incarcerated to prevent manic moments. While Georges is in prison, Jeanne starts a relationship with Georges' friend, Erik. Jeanne gives birth to Erik's daughter, Elisabeth, whose birth Georges hears and believes was punishment for his act. Eventually, he is released early, and he is gifted a painting by Jules as a parting gift before he leaves.

In the present, Jeanne shares that Christiane has moved out to live with Jacky in Guido Gezellestraat near Anderlecht. Their neighbor, Alex, visits the two, but Georges, knowing that he was against him during his arrest, drives him away. Georges says that Jeanne, having found a new lover who supports her in Erik, can move out. Erik later arrives, and they have a tense dinner together. Erik tells the story of how he and Jeanne began their relationship during a funeral of a mutual friend. Georges lashes out at the two before Erik leaves for the night, and the drunk Georges once again starts a fight with Jeanne before briefly making love with her and then passing out. Jeanne goes off to Erik's home, where Erik reveals he has taken a job in Rouen and will leave the next morning. Jeanne is torn between staying with Georges or leaving with Erik, while Erik says he is okay with whoever she chooses.

Georges retrieves Erik back into his home, where Georges insists to be legally known as Elisabeth's father and the three finally talk about his relationship with Christiane. Georges admits to having sex with his daughter only once; Jeanne confesses she had figured out their affair yet still lied in court. Having closed that chapter, Georges explains that he wants Erik to have sex with Jeanne one last time before Erik leaves for good to conclude their relationship and prevent any lingering feelings. Jeanne and Erik comply while Georges takes a walk outside and falls asleep on a bench before returning the next morning. After breakfast, Erik shares his farewells while Jeanne reluctantly rejects his caresses before he leaves, ending their relationship. Georges joins Jeanne as they sit together to talk about their plans for the future.

== Cast ==
- Frank Aendenboom - Georges Vermeersch
- Kitty Courbois - Jeanne Vermeersch
- Herbert Flack - Erik
- Hilde Van Mieghem - Christiane Vermeersch
- Hugo Van Den Berghe - Jules
- Theo Daese - Alex
- Jakob Beks - Model voor Jules
- Chris Cauwenbergs - Verpleger in gevangenis
- Dirk Celis - Advokaat Georges
- Jo De Caluwé - Bewaking Delhaize
- Herman Fabri - Secretaris
- Blanka Heirman - Buurvrouw
- Karin Jacobs - Solange
- Guido Lauwaert - Agent
- Ann Petersen - Moeder van Erik
- Fons Rademakers - Chef van Jules
- Roger Raveel - Bijtebier
