= Francesca Vanthielen =

Belgian actress

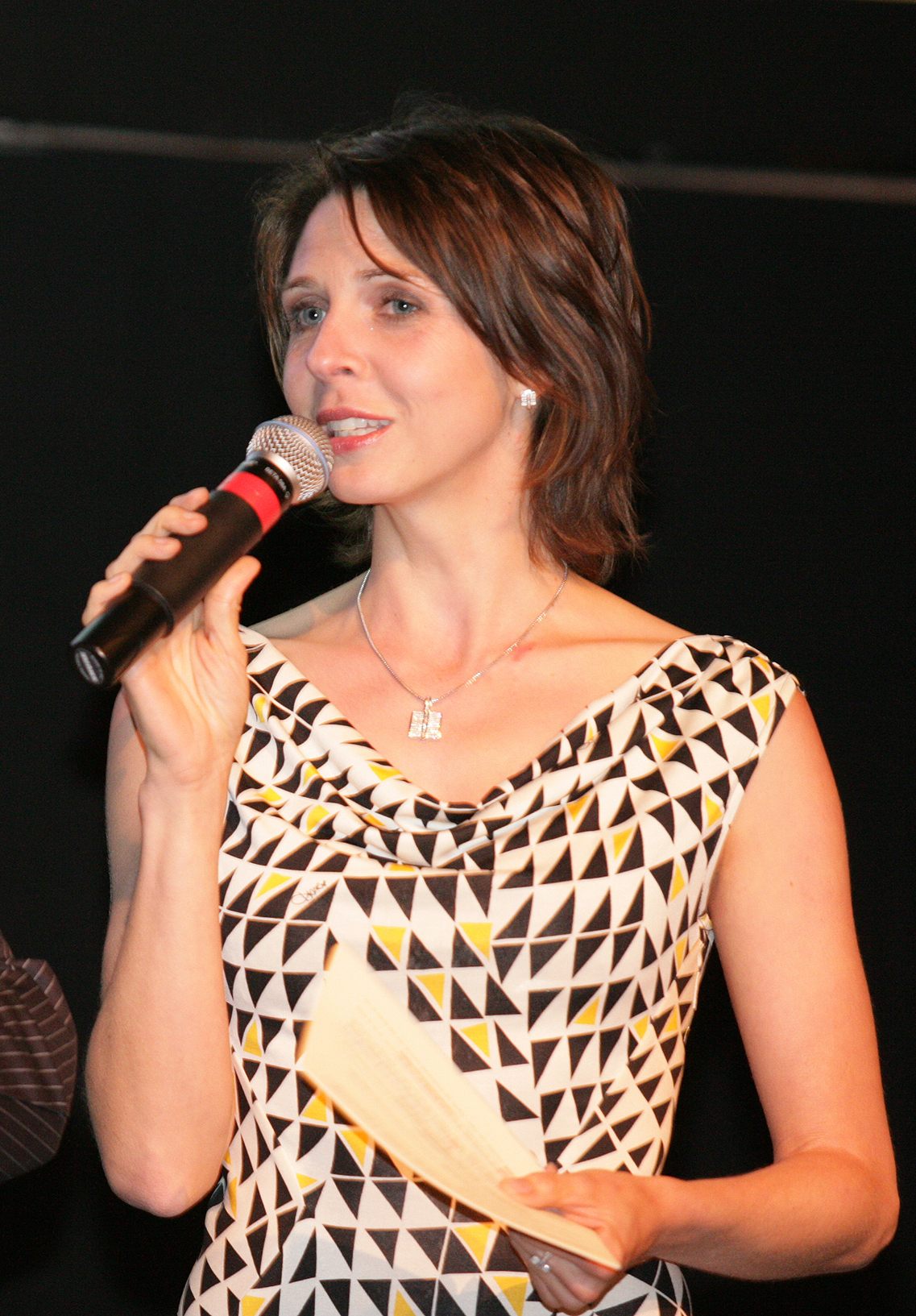
Francesca Vanthielen

Francesca Vanthielen (born 24 December 1972 in Eeklo) is a Belgian television actress and host, radio presenter, and economist. She is probably best known internationally for playing the lead role in the Svalbard-set adventure film When the Light Comes (1998) and for hosting Sterren op de dansvloer (Dancing with the Stars) between 2005 and 2008. She has worked as a host on Radio TAM TAM (BRT), Q-music and Studio Brussel.

Her childhood and adolescent years were spent in Zonhoven and she currently resides in Antwerp. Her father is an economist in Diepenbeek and her mother is a social worker in Geel. Vanthielen holds a degree in Applied Economics from the Katholieke Universiteit Leuven and has a Post Graduate in Acting from the Mountview Theatre School in London. In 2009 she obtained a master's degree in comparative and international politics at the Katholieke Universiteit Leuven.

== Filmography ==
- Bingo (TV series) (1987)
- Boys as Dana (1992)
- When the Light Comes as Ellen (1998)
- Spoed (TV series) (2002)
- Wittekerke (TV series) as Phaedra Govaerts (2003-2004)
- Aspe (TV series) as Hannelore Martens (2004—)
- Baantjer (TV series) as Eva de Long (2006)
- Skating with Celebrities (TV series) as host (2006)
- Dancing with the Stars (TV series) as host (2005-2008)
- Sterren op het IJs (TV series) as host (2007)
- De Italiaanse Droom (TV series) (2008-2009)
- LouisLouise (TV series) (2009)
- De Andalusische droom (TV series) as host (2009-2010)
- Gelukkig getrouwd? (TV series) as host (2010)
- My Name Is (TV series) as host (2010)
- Domino, de zoektocht (TV series) as host (2011)
- Cijfers Liegen Niet (TV series) as host (2012)
