= Nicholas Zeppos (army general) =

Nicholas Zeppos was a general in the Hellenic Army in the 1930s. By 1936, he was the commander of the Salonica military district. When tobacco workers went on strike to demand higher wages, Zeppos announced he would attack them with military force, including "tanks, airplaines and warships."
