= Koko Flanel =

- Directed by: Stijn Coninx
- Story by: Alain Berliner; W.L. Luk Janssen
- Produced by: Erwin Provoost; Maurits De Prins
- Starring: Urbanus; Bea Van der Maat; Ann Petersen
- Distributed by: MMG
- Release date: 1990
- Country: Belgium
- Language: Dutch

Koko Flanel is a Belgian comedy film directed by Stijn Coninx starring Urbanus, Bea Van der Maat, Willeke van Ammelrooy, Herbert Flack and Ann Petersen. The film was released in 1990 and was until 18 February 2009 the most successful Flemish film with respect to the number of visitors in Belgian movie theatres. It was then beaten by Loft.

== Story ==
Placide Smellekens is an unsuccessful market vendor of birdcages and accessories. His father demanded, just before dying, Placide must get married within one year. If not, his father will return as a ghost to haunt him. Placide explains that this is going to be rather difficult: 1) woman do not turn up again after a date, 2) he is afraid to have children as ugly as the daughters of his brother.

A few days later, Placide is at the market. At same time, a famous fashion company is taking photos to promote their expensive fur coats. After the posters have been published it turns out Placide is visible in the background wearing an awful cheap pink sweater. Without knowing, the company created a hype: Placide is recognized everywhere, and more, everyone wants such a pink sweater instead of a fur coat.

The fashion company invites Placide to give him a ransom. There he meets Sarah, one of the secretaries, and falls in love. She is however in love with Arlondo, one of the best models, who promised her to divorce from his wife to start a new life with Sarah.

The management is more and more convinced Placide will be a good investment for further campaigns. Although he does not have the qualities of a good model, the people adore him for his simplicity. Placide gets a full-time job. As from now he will be known as "Koko Flanel".

The other models are not happy with their new colleague. They must follow strict diets, training schemes, guidelines, etc., whereas Koko can do and eat whatever he wants. Furthermore, almost all big customers want Placide in their commercials and the "real models" are neglected.

Placide finds out Sarah wants to make her own clothing line, which is rejected by the management. Sarah becomes more and more interested in the naïve Placide which results in a jealous Arlondo.

Some time after Placide quits his job, Sarah breaks all contact with him. A depressed Placide visits Sarah's mother who thinks he must win the heart of Sarah. Together, they sabotage the new fashion show and replace all clothes with Sarah's designs. The customers find those clothes so exclusive, they all want to distribute them. Sarah decides Arlondo is not the person she really loves and chooses for Placide.

== Soundtrack ==
She Likes Double Trouble - Mystery

== Cast ==
- Urbanus - Placide Smellekens
- Bea Van der Maat - Sarah
- Willeke van Ammelrooy - Germaine
- Herbert Flack - Arlondo
- Ann Petersen - Dora, mother of Sarah
- Henri Garcin - Didier de Merengue
- Koen Crucke - Jean-Claude
- Philippe Kerjean - Helmut de Merengue
- Isabelle Noah - Orphelia
- Leontine Nelissen - Hildeke
- Marc-Henri Wajnberg - Frédérique
- Chris Cauwenberghs - Fritz
- Romain Deconinck - Father Smellekens
- Jan Decleir - Azère, brother of Placide
