= Urbanus =

Belgian comedian

Urbain Servranckx
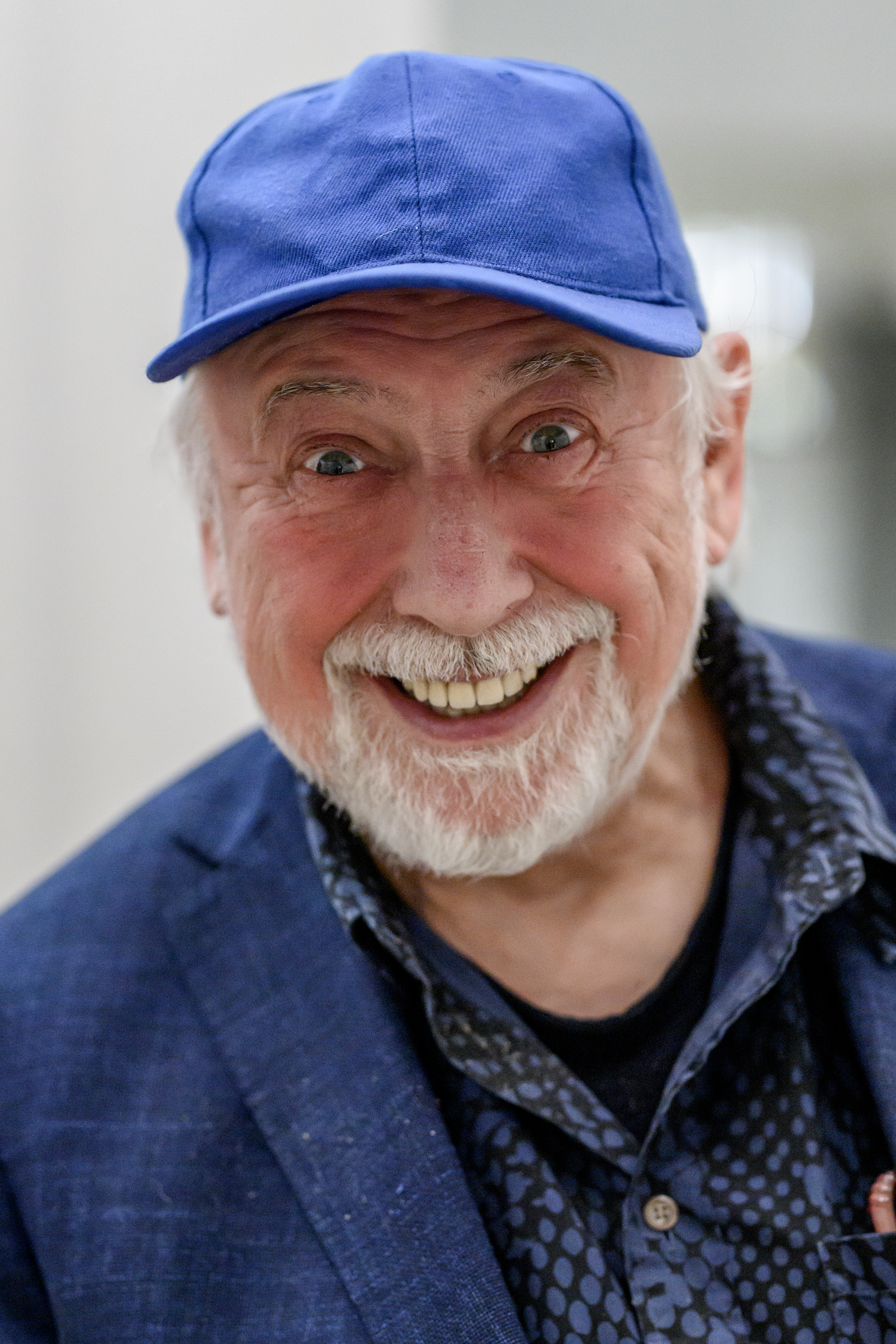
- Urbanus in 2023
- Born: 7 June 1949 (age 77); Dilbeek, Belgium
- Other names: Urbain, Urbanus van Anus
- Occupations: Actor, comedian, singer

Urbain Servranckx (born 7 June 1949), better known as Urbanus, is a Belgian comedian, actor, singer and comic book writer. Although he is most famous as comedian, some of his songs became hits, such as Bakske vol met stro (1979), Madammen met een bontjas (1980) and Hittentit (1982). He is one of the most popular and famous entertainers in Flanders and the Netherlands.

== Career ==
Urbanus, artist's name of Urbain Joseph Servranckx (Dilbeek, 7 June 1949) is a Belgian comedian, singer, guitarist, author of comic books and actor. Originally he used the artist name: Urbanus van Anus. Anus was the name of his former backing group. In 1973 he began performing cabaret and comedy. He became popular in Flanders and managed to duplicate his success in the Netherlands, building a steady career since. He has appeared in TV shows, some which he wrote himself. Urbanus released several musical singles, some of which entered the hit parade. Urbain went solo in 1974 under the name Urbanus van Anus. After the then BRT (Belgian Radio and Television) asked him for a comic act, he dropped the name "van Anus" and since then it has been simply Urbanus. The first cover of Urbanus live was also drawn by Daniël Geirnaert. His Christmas song Bakske Vol Met Stro (1979) was controversial for lampooning the biblical story of the birth of Jesus, but also became his signature song and best-selling record for the very same reasons. Urbanus considers himself an atheist, although he wed in the Roman Catholic Church and had his children baptized. In 2008, he was awarded the Prize for Liberty by the Flemish think tank Nova Civitas.

== Film career ==
Urbanus starred in three films: Hector (1987), Koko Flanel (1990) and De Zevende Hemel. The two first films were the leaders in the Flemish box offices for many years. His first movie, Hector, directed by Stijn Coninx, won the 1988 international comedy film festival in Chamrousse, France. He also was named best actor by Radio France and Dauphiné Libéré. Seventh Heaven was a box office bomb. In Flanders and the Netherlands Urbanus is well-known and very popular since 1974. Although he is most famous as a comedian, some of his songs became hits, such as Bakske vol met stro (1979), Madammen met een bontjas (1980) and Hittentit (1982). Urbanus lent his voice to the Flemish versions of the Pixar movies, Cars and Cars 2, where he was the voice of the character Mater. In 2019 the animated movie Urbanus: De Vuilnisheld released in theaters. This movie was based on the comics series about a childlike version of Urbanus himself. It is an original story and not based on any of the comic issues. Urbanus co-wrote the movie and also voiced his movie counterpart.

== Comics career ==
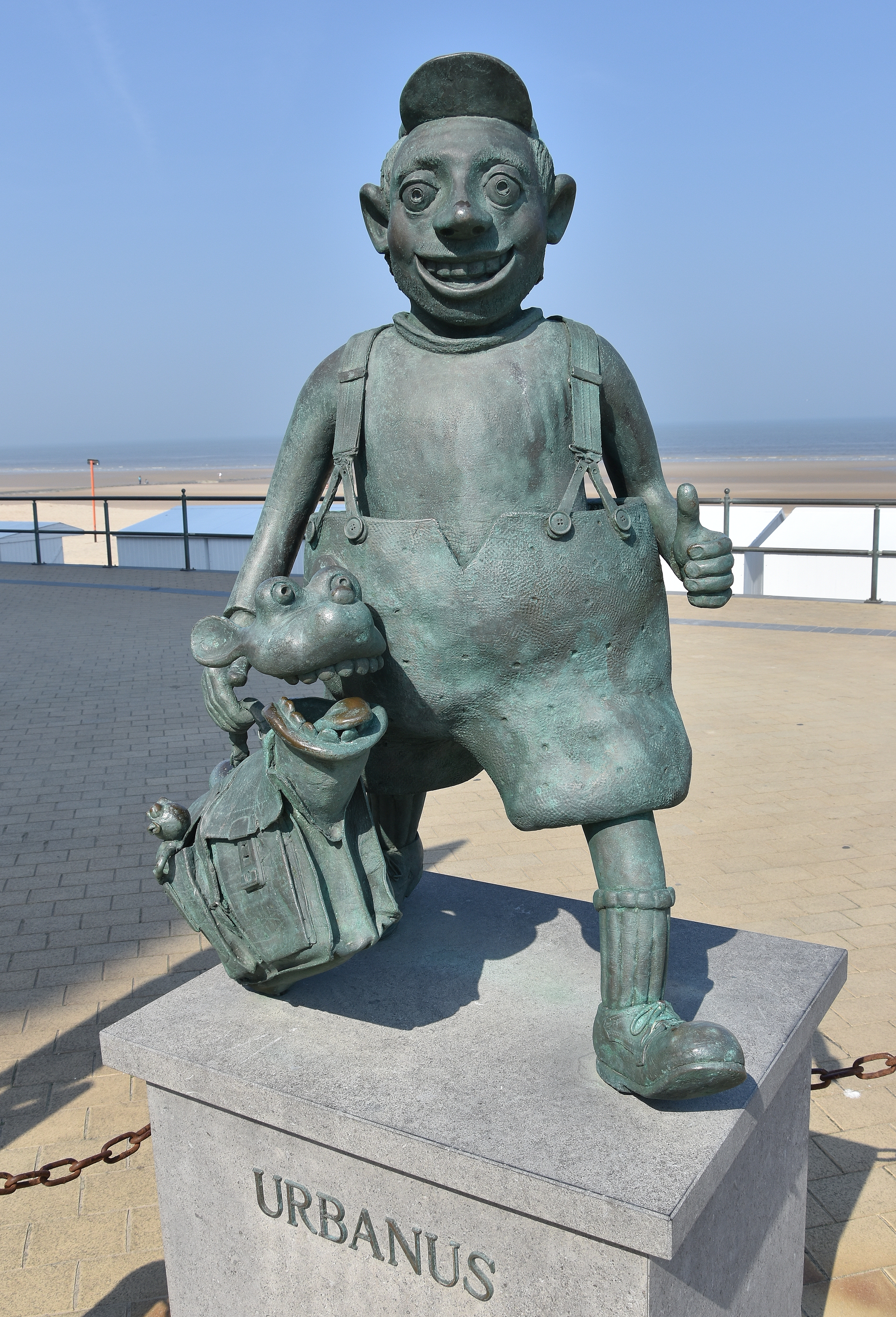
Statue in Middelkerke of Urbanus' comics version

Urbanus is script writer of a comics series about a childlike version of himself, Urbanus, which debuted in 1982. The series is drawn by Willy Linthout and from the third story on, Urbanus started providing the scenarios. The comic strip managed to become the longest-running series in the celebrity-inspired genre. In 2022, after 40 years and 201 albums, it was decided to stop the comic series. The comics also sell well in the Netherlands.

Urbanus also writes the gags for the satirical comic De Geverniste Vernepelingskes (1998), which pokes fun at several Flemish celebrities. It was first drawn by Jan Bosschaert, then Dirk Stallaert and finally Steven Dupré. Urbanus also writes gags for the children's comics Plankgas en Plastronneke (2004–2008) and Mieleke Melleke Mol (since 2003), both drawn by Dirk Stallaert.

Urbanus has also drawn some gag comics himself. He also illustrated many of his own album covers.

== Discography ==
=== Albums ===
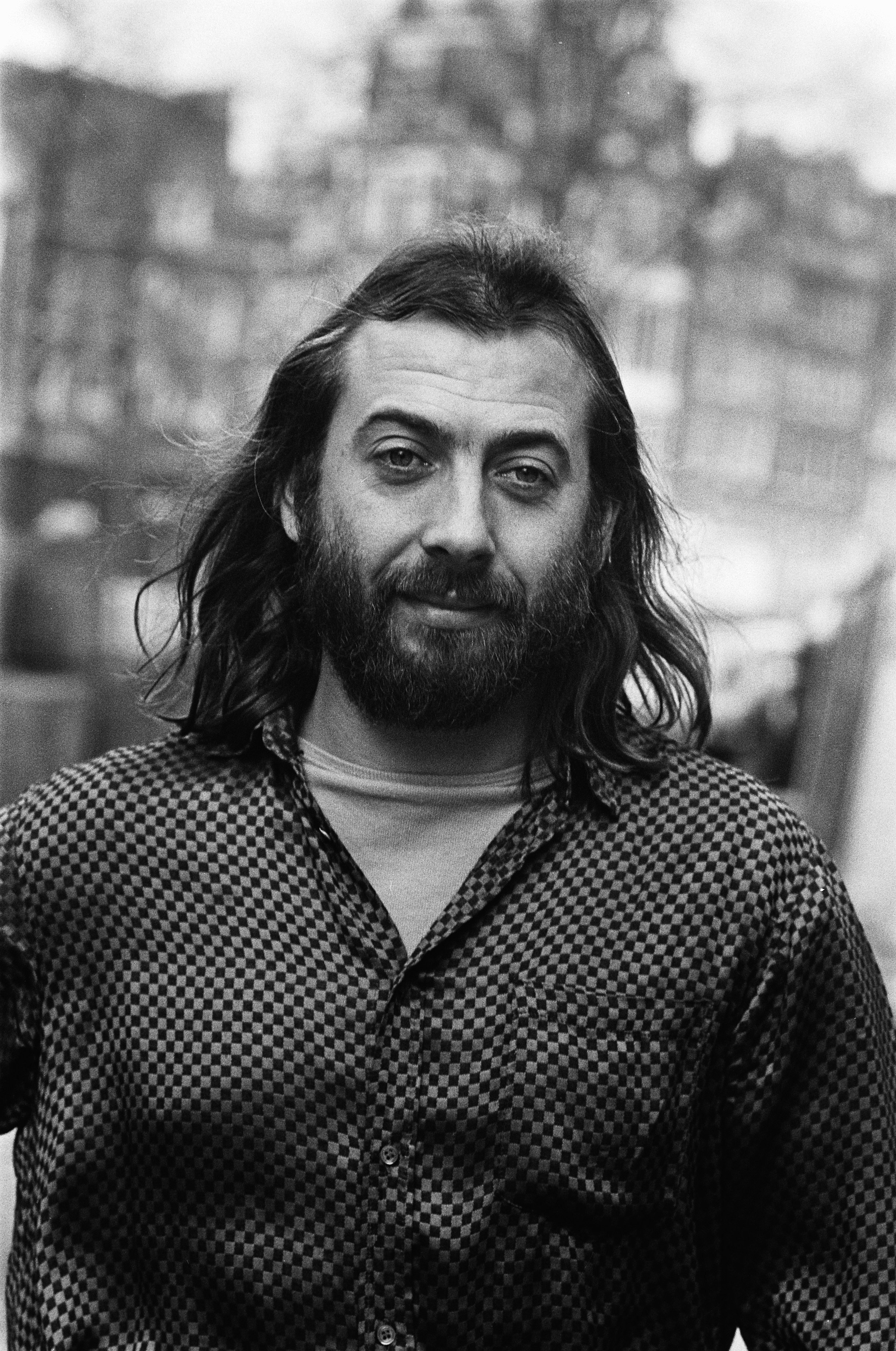
Urbanus in 1979

Year	Album	Peak positions		Note
Year	Album	BEL (FL)	NLD	Note
1974	Urbanus van Anus leevend	–	–	
1975	Urbanus van anus in de weide / op de vijver	–	–	
1977	Drie sprookjes	–	–	
1978	Volle maan	–	–	
1979	Is er toevallig een Urbanus in de zaal?	–	24	Live album
1982	Urbanus VI	–	20	Live album
1983	Tien jaar live	–	26	Live album / Compilation album
1985	Urbanus' plezantste	–	10	Live album / Compilation album
1985	Donders en bliksems	–	–	
1986	In 't echt!	–	31	Live album
1995	Iedereen beroemd	–	–	
2007	Urbanus Vobiscum	–	–	Tribute album
2010	Wie dit leest is zot!	7	–	
2011	Goe poeier!	2	–	
2013	Wan troe tie!	4	–	
2016	Urbanus zelf! – Theatertoer 2013–2015	54	–	
2017	De Legende	16	–	
2019	Trecto Pnix	53	–	
2022	In roer en rep	23	–	
2024	Eigen favoliedjes	14	–	
2026	Hartverwarmende liedjes	178	–	

=== Singles ===
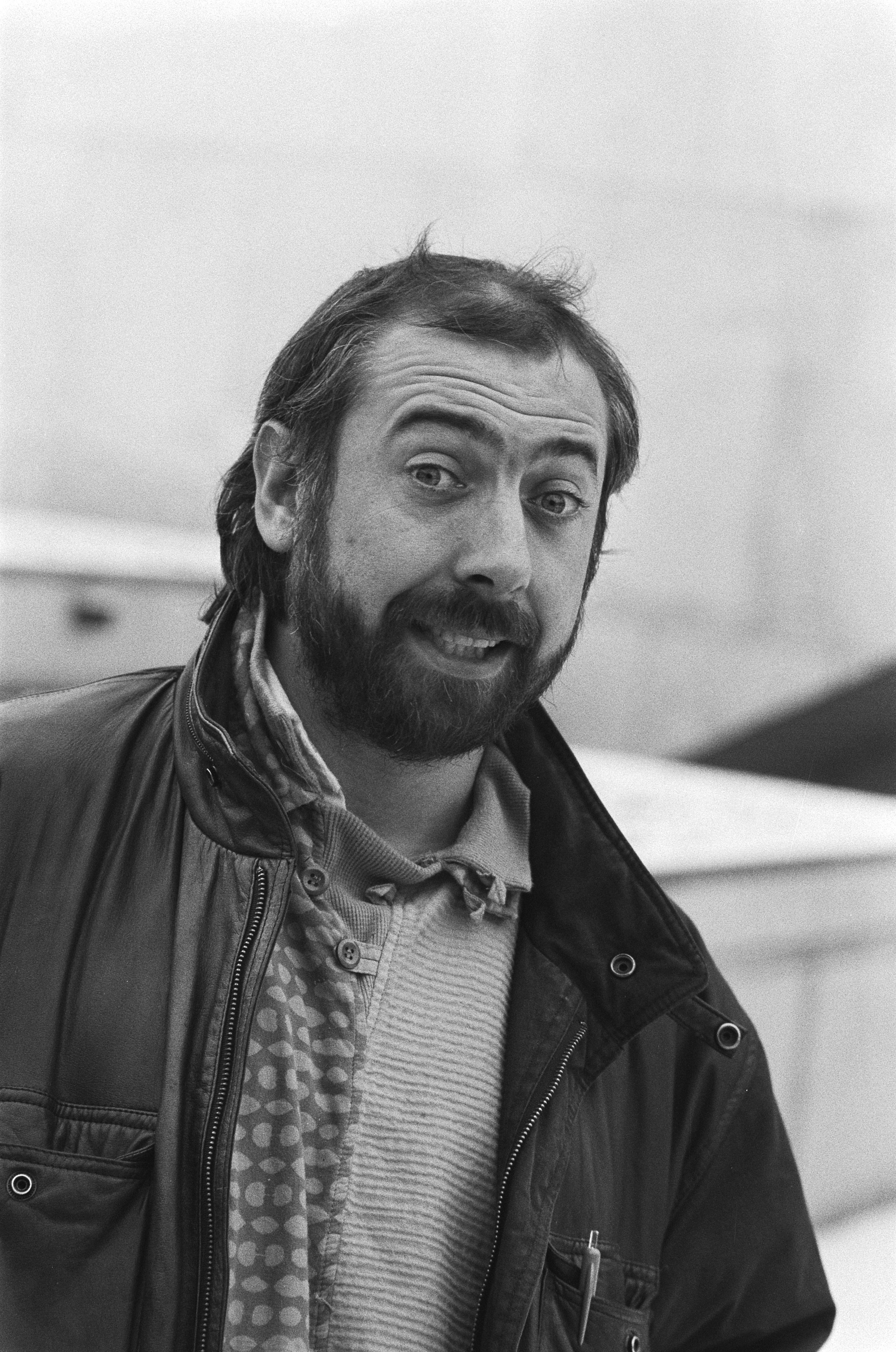
Urbanus in 1985

Year	Album	Peak positions				Notes
Year	Album	BEL (FL) Ultratop 50	BEL (FL) Ultratip	NLD Dutch Top 40	NLD Single Top 100	Notes
1979	"Een Bakske vol met stro"	1	–	–	–	
1980	"Quand les zosiaux chantent dans le bois"	3	–	–	–	
1982	"Kodazuur"	39	–	–	50	
1982	"Hittentit"	24	–	–	50	
1983	"Awel Mercie"	27	–	–	–	
1984	"Scratchin' zwaantjes"	10	–	–	–	
1994	"Poesje stoei"	8	–	15	12	
1995	"De paashaas"	12	–	–	–	
2007	"CO2 prostituee"	–	16	–	–	
2013	"Zetpilcar"	–	2	–	–	with Isolde Lasoen

== Films ==
Urbanus produced and appeared in several movies:

- Hector (1988)
- Koko Flanel (1990)
- Les Sept péchés capitaux (1992)
- De Zevende Hemel (1993)
- Max (1994)
- De duistere diamant (2004)
- K3 en het IJsprinsesje (2007)
- Mega Mindy en het Zwarte Kristal (2010)

Urbanus did voices for the following movies:

- March of the Penguins (2005) – narration for the Dutch version
- Cars (2006) – voice of Mater for the Flemish version
- The Flight Before Christmas (2008) - voice of Julius for the Dutch/Flemish version
- Little Brother, Big Trouble: A Christmas Adventure (2012) - voice of Julius for the Dutch/Flemish version
- Urbanus: De vuilnisheld (2019) - voice of his movie counterpart
