= When the Light Comes =

When the Light Comes Licht
- Dutch theatrical release poster
- Directed by: Stijn Coninx
- Written by: Heleen van der Laan; Jean van de Velde
- Based on: Waar blijft het licht by Heleen van der Laan
- Produced by: Paul Voorthuysen
- Starring: Joachim Król; Francesca Vanthielen; Reidar Sørensen; Rick Engelkes
- Cinematography: Theo Bierkens
- Edited by: Ludo Troch
- Music by: Dirk Brossé
- Production company: Favourite Films
- Distributed by: Concorde Film (Netherlands); PolyGram Filmed Entertainment (Belgium); Buena Vista International (Germany)
- Release dates: 7 January 1998 (Belgium); 29 January 1998 (Netherlands); 31 December 1998 (Germany)
- Running time: 115 minutes
- Countries: Netherlands; Belgium; Germany; Denmark
- Language: English

When the Light Comes (Belgium: Licht, Netherlands: Waar blijft het licht, Germany: Die Stunde des Lichts) is a 1998 German-Dutch /Belgian romantic adventure film drama directed by Stijn Coninx, and starring Francesca Vanthielen, Joachim Król and Rick Engelkes. The film is based on an autobiography of the then 19-year-old student in Amsterdam Heleen van der Laan who spent the winter in Svalbard living with a fur trapper. It was adapted for the screen with the aid of Jean van de Velde. Essentially a love story set in northern Scandinavia, the film has "themes of isolation, forced cohabitation and relationship building between two totally different people in extremely harsh living conditions". The score was composed by Dirk Brossé and the film was produced by Favourite Films and distributed by Concorde Film.

== Plot ==
Young Ellen decides to take a boat journey to Svalbard in northern Norway. She ends up wandering in Spitsbergen, where she spends winter in a cabin on a fjord surrounded by glaciers. She shares a cabin with a Norwegian trapper named Lars as she tries to adapt to the perilous climate and face dangers such as fighting polar bears.

== Cast ==
- Francesca Vanthielen as Ellen
- Rick Engelkes as Robbert
- Joachim Król as Lars
- Reidar Sørensen as Ragnar
- Rodney Beddal as Jaromir
- Marit Bolling as Saleswoman
- Karin Lunden as Irina
- Morten Røhrt as Pilot 1
- Per Skjølsvik as Pilot 2
- Yana Yanezic as Gaumata

== Production ==
The film was shot in 35 mm on location in northern Norway and Iceland. Schiphol Airport in Amsterdam also appeared in the film. Director Coninx describes the film as "A small story in a grand setting". He said in Dutch, "We did it in different ways. As a dream for example, or as a bet. Many men will not understand this girl. By choosing this adventurous form and the characters, away from the bustle and stress of the society, forcing them in a different and clearer way of looking at each other. Then exerts nature, and especially the light there at the pool months away, a strong influence on the man and woman. Making those connections in the story, the efforts for the public to look in a certain way, it made this film hard, much harder than Daens." He described cinematographer Theo Bierkens as an "incredible magician". The film was produced in English, but a Norwegian and Russian version also released.

== Release and reception ==
The film was released primarily for the international market. The film was screened at the International Film Festival of Mar del Plata in Argentina, and won several awards in Belgium and several international awards. At the Biberach Independent Film Festival in Biberach an der Riss, the film won the prize of the international jury and the prize for best production. Francesca Vanthielen won the Jury Prize at the Geneva Film Festival. It also won the audience award at the Tromsø International Film Festival in 1999.

Henk Ten Berge of the De Telegraaf described the film as "one of the strangest films ever produced by a Dutchman" and a "bizarre adventure" but praised the cinematography. Filmkrant said that the relationship between Ellen and Norwegian trapper was "not that exciting", describing Lars as a "rather clumsy eccentric who barely seems to speak a word of English" but said that the character was "touchingly played" by German actor Joachim Król. Film Krant also believed that the polar bear scene, whilst exciting, diverted the viewer's attention from their developing relationship, but praised the cinematography of the film by Theo Bierkens, describing it as "truly overwhelming". Positif called it an "ecological robinsonade". Marceau Verhaeghe of Cinergie praised the finesse and intelligence of screenwriter Jean van de Velde, and similarly the expertise and talent of Coninx, who he described in French as an "outstanding filmmaker" who "gives us an endearing movie, which takes advantage of even anecdotal aspects... to further enrich the story. A history of tensions, trials, but also tenderness, humor and love. In short, a really good history of cinema." The soundtrack by top Flemish film score composer Dirk Brossé has been cited as one of his best works.
