= Het Beest =

1982 film by Paul Collet

Promotional poster for the film

Het Beest (The Beast) is a 1982 Belgian/Dutch film, made by Flemish writer/director Paul Collet and starring Willem Ruis. For Ruis, who was at the height of his career as a showman and presenter on Dutch television, it was his first and last appearance in cinema. The movie was a flop.

== Background and production ==
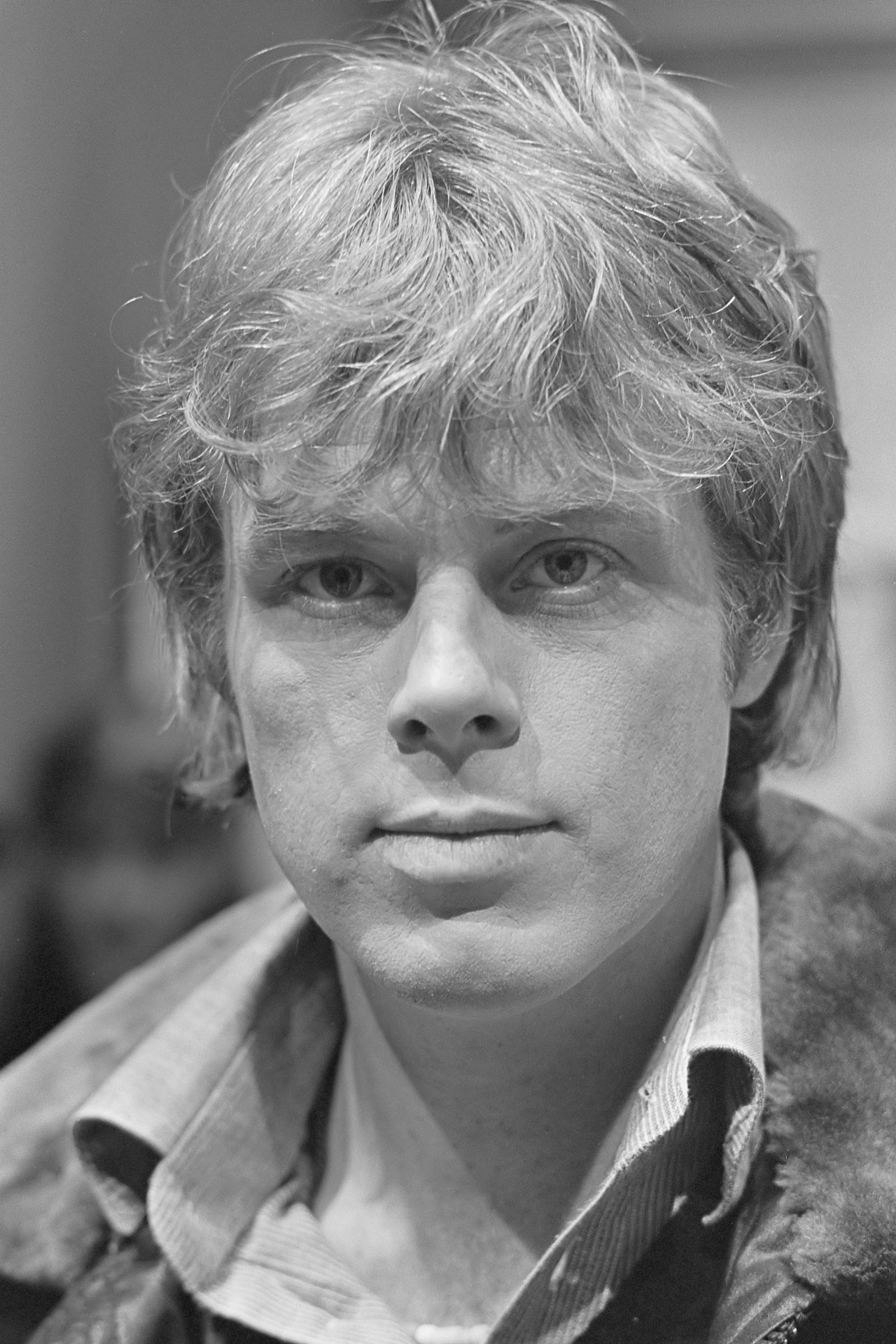
Willem Ruis in 1976; photo by Koen Suyk.

The film was written and directed by Paul Collet. It was shot in 1981, and released in April 1982. Willem Ruis, presenter of various quiz shows and a very popular variety program, stars as Harry Melchior. He had just moved from the KRO to the VARA, trading in his Willem Ruis Show for the Willem Ruis Lottoshow. He was paid a salary unheard of at the time (Hfl 300,000 per year, high enough to lead to questions in parliament) but explained that his career in television was not going to last forever, and his side step to cinema was a career plan for the long-term. Some extra scenes were shot for the Dutch release.

== Plot ==
Harry Melchior (Ruis) works for an investment firm and lives a privileged life with his family until he discovers that for one of his deals his mother's house will have to be torn down. Unable to stop the project he occupies the house illegally and is sentenced to prison, losing his job. His mother (the performance by Cara van Wersch was praised by one critic) is forced to move into a nursing home and dies shortly thereafter, sending Melchior into a rage. Hiding out in the forest "like a Dutch Rambo," he ambushes his former colleagues while they are fox hunting, and shoots them with a machine gun. After a meeting with his former boss's mistress he surrenders to police.

== Reception ==
The film was a "legendary flop." Its script was deemed disjointed, and the violence excessive. The response from film was negative, and it was pulled from movie theaters very quickly.

== Cast ==
- Willem Ruis – Harry Melchior
- Hedie Meyling – Lenie Melchior
- Anouk Collet – Bibi Melchior
- Cara van Wersch – mother
- Ward de Ravet – Karlsen
- Josée Ruiter – Martine
- Bert André – investigative judge
- Freya Ligtenberg – Eveline
- Alex van Haecke – audience member
- Wim Langeraert – commando
- Pol Goossen – police inspector
- Harry Kümel – man on interstate
- Ivo Pauwels – Charles
- Filip van Flem – Harry (age 6)
- Elise Nabar – girl in casino
- Marpessa Henninck – girl in casino
- Emanuela van Laar – girl in casino
- Akkemay Elderenbos
