= Het Pleintje =

- Created by: Jan Matterne
- Starring: Jo De Meyere; Johny Voners; Nora Tilley; Jef Burm; Bert Champagne; Rita Smets; René Verreth; Manu Verreth; Mandus De Vos; Doris Van Caneghem; Emmy Leemans; Machteld Ramoudt; Tuur De Weert; Tessy Moerenhout; Ugo Prinsen; Jenny Tanghe; Alex Willequet; Lia Lee; Theo Hijzen; Jacky Morel; Jeanine Schevernels; Aafke Bruining; Jaak Van Assche; Janine Beschops; Geert Vermeulen
- Country of origin: Belgium
- Original language: Dutch
- No. of seasons: 3
- No. of episodes: 27

Production
- Running time: 30 minutes
- Production company: BRT

Original release
- Network: BRT1
- Release: 1986 – 1987

Het Pleintje, can be translated as The Little Square, was a Flemish television series produced by the former public broadcasting channel BRT, nowadays VRT. It was aired between 1986 and 1987 and contains 27 episodes. The series were written by Jan Matterne and directed by Juul Claes.

== Plot ==
The series is set around a (fictional) square somewhere in Belgium, most probably around Brussels, and is about the adventures and struggling of its inhabitants. A part of the tenants are catholic such as priest Pol Sickx, sexton Felix Piepermans, pub-owner Poliet Peck and the Stoffels family. Another part is more progressive such as art painter Karel Peers, Barbara Vink and the Briers family. The third group is liberal: the families de Lesseweg, Aerts and Bank. The local shop is run by Gust and Millie Kerdoens. Although they are liberal, they must act neutral afraid to lose customers.

The series starts when a camera team is making a documentary about the charming square which is to be broadcast on national television. The host of the show - Jan Matterne - introduces the inhabitants and shows its cultural attractions such as the church and the painting "De Rechtvaardige Vrederechters" (translated as The Righteous Justices of the Peace) in the law court where Aristide de Lesseweg runs a Justice of the peace.

The first dispute in the series to be handled before court is the case where the goats of police officer Gerard Briers ate the flowers of his neighbor Harry Stoffels. Stoffels, a catholic, is married with Emmy and they have two children: Nico and Nicole who is a few years older. Felix, a gossip, spreads the word Nicole is pregnant of Luc Briers, son of Gerard. As they are not married, this is a scandal the more she is catholic and he is not. When this turns out to be the truth priest Sickx and Aristide are forced to interfere and to convince both families "a mixed marriage" is necessary. Nicole and Luc rent a room above the shop of Gust Kerdoens but are unable to pay the rent. Furthermore, it is rather clear the couple is not in love. He is convinced to go to university and Nicole must stay at home to take care of the baby he doesn't want. She wants him to stay and to apply for some job - even if it is underpaid - so they both can raise the child. As both families are rather poor, they neither have money to buy a wedding dress nor a black tie. That's why Emmy tried to make a dress in which she partially fails. Luckily for her, local tailor and doom predictor Fons offers his services for free and adjusts the dress so it is more comfortable. Luc is forced to rent a black tie but as he feigns a twisted ankle, hoping he misses the wedding ceremony, his father Gerard splits the trouser. Due to the slowing up, the couple arrives late in church so the priest already left. The wedding takes place some hours later when a drunk Sickx is back. During the ceremony Sickx implies Bernard Aerts did his studies in a seminary. Much later it is revealed Bernard is actually a departed priest who does not want to marry Justine as he might re-enter. This starts a second dispute in which Harry accuses Gerard to be responsible for the whole incident and that Gerard should pay all bills. Gerard accuses Harry the opposite as Harry and Gust forged receipts. Aristide, not fond of Catholicism, convinces both to accuse the priest as he is the one who left and thus responsible for the cancelled wedding ceremony. During the trial Luc spills out he did not twist his ankle and it was Boniface, the brother of Aristide, who came up with this idea. This results in a verdict the priest has to pay 1 Belgian Franc moral compensation to Harry and another Belgian Franc to Gerard. It is at this point Harry decides to leave the catholic side.

Gust is sure his wife Millie has an affair with her Spanish language teacher. This is acknowledged when she is asked by him to be a tour guide and Gust finds some letters. Gust gets pity with Nicole since Luc left her so he offers her a job as cashier in the shop. Millie leaves for the tour trip but after a few hours she returns and asks Gust forgiveness.

Art painter Karel Peers is in love with Barbara so is Gentil Bers, a politician, who takes care of his handicapped, demanding mother Eveline. Barbara is interested in both, but does not want a relationship as she has leukemia which she hides. It is in this period she is frequently visited by priest Sickx who finally admits to be in love with her. To avoid to be expelled as a priest, they stop their forbidden romance. However, the extreme catholic Seraphine Sap got notice about the relationship but can't proof it. She is not very happy with the rather broad-minded modern priest so she spies on him and informs the bishop of every step/decision Sickx took and how a more traditional priest should have solved it.

Aristide is sexually attracted to Aurelia Bank, daughter of Bertha who runs "De Oude Griffie" (translated as: The Old Court Registry), a chic bistro. The bistro is visited by the more rich people such as Bernard Aerts who lives together with Justine. Justine is obsessed by cleaning her house, suffers a mental breakdown and absconds. Aurelia is not interested in Aristide at all and calls him "a pig with the neck of a bull". She also abominates the fact Aristide continuously humiliates his brother Boniface and describes him as a plaster garden gnome. Initially Aurelia pretends to fancy Aristide as he is a good customer who frequently pays the bills of others. Later on, she and Boniface start a fake relationship just for pestering Aristide.

One day, Felix and Seraphine find out the painting "De Rechtvaardige Vrederechters" was originally owned by the church and was known as "De Pauselijke Nuntius" (Translated as: the Papal Nuncio). They want the painting back and start a lawsuit. A former starving priest donated the painting to the courthouse of Aristide his grandfather. This means the painting is actually property of the Belgian State, so a representative of them is sent. Nevertheless the case is handled by Aristide. Before the case starts, the representative walks into the catholic pub and has a chat with the customers. Solely based upon the property document the Catholics can never win the case as the handover was more than 30 years ago thus time-barred. That's why the Catholics drop the case during the court hearing. Upon that the representative doubts the validity of the transfer: the priest was on his death bed, the signature seems not to be genius, the lawyer may have forced the priest to sign or he placed the signature himself. As this kind of trials cannot be appealed, Aristide must now decide who is the actual owner or how to continue. That's why he concludes that the case was withdrawn by the plaintiff. Some hours later, the painting is stolen.

The Catholics are to be thought to have stolen the painting and more presumable Felix Piepermans, priest Sickx and Mrs Sap. A man is arrested who tries to escape the square with a big painting but it turns out to be Peers with a self-made painting. It's only much later it is suspected that Peers over-painted the original work but it is never proved. Aristide suddenly realizes Bernard may have stolen the painting. He lives in the adjoining house and can enter the court via his garden and a back door. However, the painting is gone and rumors stop where it is or who stole it.

The pub Poliet rents is to be sold. Aristide wants to buy the house, demolish it and place his private park. Another conspiracy is set up by the Catholics so the pub is bought by a straw man. Fons and Marie have financial issues: they evaded taxes for years and now have to pay a huge fine. As they do not have the money a bailiff sells their belongings in a public sale. Aristide is tricked so he bids 36.000 Belgian Francs on the first object to be sold: a table. This means Marie and Fons their debts are paid and they can keep all of their other belongings. As the cloth-making does not earn enough money, Fons opens a shop in astrology and sells healing stones, dowsers... As this neither earns money, Marie opens a restaurant in her living room. Her main customers are the inhabitants of the square so it is important to make a reservation in time. The first days the restaurant is fully booked, but after then reservations stay out so Marie is obliged to close.

One day some gypsies park their camper on the square. They are the main suspect of a bunch of thievery, such as in the house of Sickx and de Lesseweg, where expensive bottles of wine are stolen. It turns out Justine is the wrongdoer. She is barely holding it together and does not want to live further with Bernard. That's why she became addicted to wine. She disappears for some time.

The marriage between Luc and Nicole is over and a divorce seems the only solution. A pregnant Nicole will most probably have to raise the child on her own. She gives birth to a son named Floris. This causes a new dispute: the Stoffels family wants Floris to be baptized but the Biers family is against it.

== Cast ==
- Priest Pol Sickx - Jo De Meyere
- Art painter Karel Peers - Johny Voners
- Sociologist Barbara Vink - Nora Tilley
- Sexton Felix Piepermans - Jef Burm
- Pub owner Poliet Peck - Bert Champagne
- Miss Seraphine Sap - Rita Smets
- Justice of the peace Aristide de Lesseweg - René Verreth
- Boniface de Lesseweg - Manu Verreth
- Registrar Bernard Aerts - Mandus De Vos
- Justine Aerts - Doris Van Caneghem
- Bistro owner Bertha Bank - Emmy Leemans
- Aurelia Bank - Machteld Ramoudt
- Shop owner Gust Kerdoens - Tuur De Weert
- Millie Kerdoens - Tessy Moerenhout
- Gentil Bers - Ugo Prinsen
- Eveline Bers - Jenny Tanghe
- Tailor Fons Vanbrabant - Alex Wilequet
- Marie Vanbrabant-Van Mechelen - Lia Lee
- Mon Verbiest - Theo Hijzen
- Mail man Harry Stoffels - Jacky Morel
- Emmy Stoffels - Jeanine Schevernels
- Nicole Stoffels - Aafke Bruining
- Police officer Gerard Briers - Jaak Van Assche
- Annie Briers - Janine Bischops
- Luc Briers - Geert Vermeulen

== General Reception ==
Although many professional critics described the series as "theatre performed by and created for peasants", the series still got one of the highest audience numbers with an average of 2,550,000 viewers. Despite last fact, the department "Drama" was forced by those critics to cancel the series.

The huge number of viewers is partially explained as there were only two Flemish broadcasting companies at that time: BRT1 on which the show was aired and currently known as Eén and the more cultural BRT2 (now Canvas) which barely got viewers. It was only until 1989 the first commercial broadcasting company was founded: vtm. In 2006 the series was nominated for "Humo's Awards of the Viewers" and was ranked on the 62nd place in a total of 520.

Het Pleintje is also considered to be the last series with a memorable cast. In fact, there were not that many television actors in Belgium so roles were always given to the same pool of persons meaning they frequently got roles in other series. Furthermore, most of the crew also acted in De Collega's another series created by Jan Matterne. Actually, most actors in Het Pleintje were professional theatre players and were all part of MMT.

Another point of discussion was the set. It is clear the series was taken indoors. Panels were used and in many scenes the parting lines of those panels can be seen.
