= Stijn Coninx =

Belgian film director (born 1957)

Baron Stijn Coninx
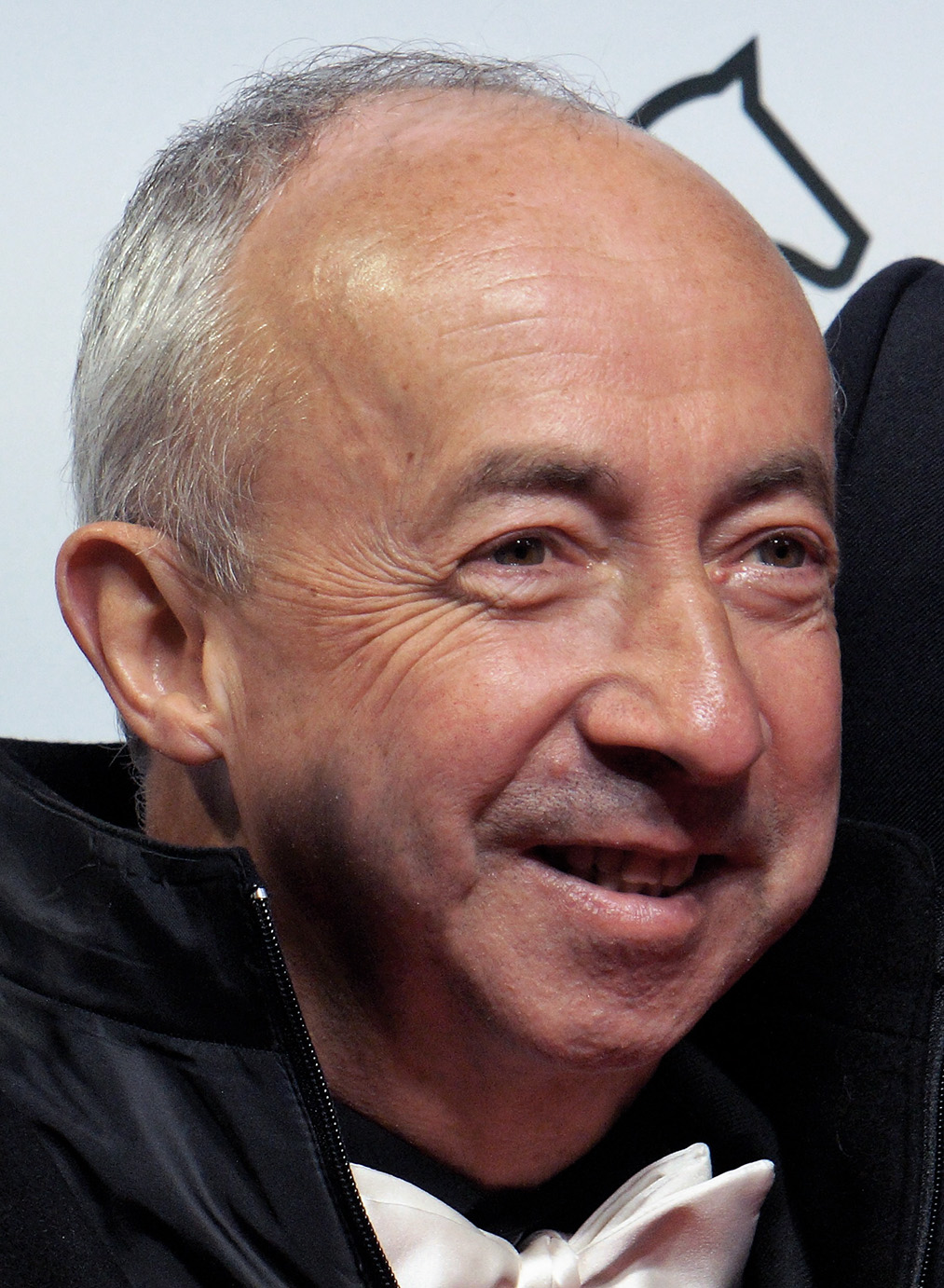
- Stijn Coninx in 2021
- Born: Augustijn Coninx; 21 February 1957 (age 69); Neerpelt, Belgium
- Occupation: film director
- Years active: 1987-

Stijn, Baron Coninx (born 21 February 1957) is a Belgian film director.

== Career ==
He studied film directing at HRITCS (currently Ritcs, at Erasmus Hogeschool Brussel). Conicx made his debut as film director in 1987 with the comedy Hector, which became the most successful movie in Belgium for a few years. He is best known for his film Daens, which was nominated for an Academy Award for Best Foreign Language Film in 1992. In 1993, Stijn Coninx was made a Baron by king Baudouin.

Coninx released two well received biographical films of Belgian artists, Sister Smile about The Singing Nun and Marina about Rocco Granata.

== Honours ==
- 1993: Created Baron Coninx by King Baudouin
- Member of the Royal Flemish Academy of Belgium for Science and the Arts.

== Filmography ==
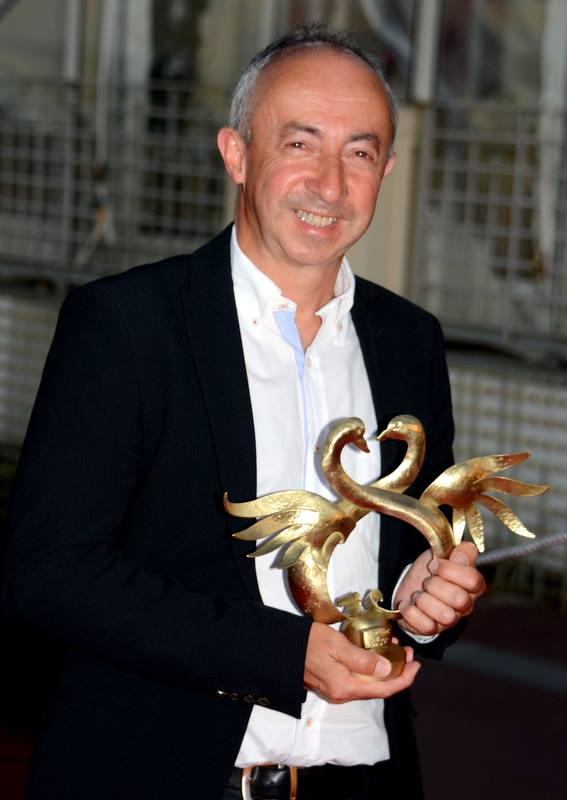
Coninx at the 2014 Cabourg Film Festival

=== Director ===
- Servais (1980), his university finals film.
- Surfing (1982), short film.
- Hector (1987)
- Koko Flanel (1990)
- Daens (1992) (nominated for an Academy Award)
- When the Light Comes (Licht) (1998)
- Sea of Silence (Verder dan de maan) (2003)
- To Walk Again (2007), documentary
- Sister Smile (2009)
- Marina (2013)
- Ay Ramon! (2015)
- Niet Schieten (2018)
- Sinterklaas en de Wakkere Nachten (2018)
- Sinterklaas en Koning Kabberdas (2021)

=== Assistant director ===
- Het Beest (1982)
- Zaman (1983) (credited as Stijn Coninckx)
- Wildschut (1985) (Stronghold in the United States)
- De Leeuw van Vlaanderen (1985)
- Skin (1987)
- Blueberry Hill (1989)

== Television work ==
- Het Peulengaleis (1999) TV series
- Nefast voor de feestvreugde (2001, 2002, 2003) TV series
- De Kavijaks (2005)
- Anneliezen (2010)

== Awards and nominations ==
Year	Association	Category	Work	Result
1992	Venice Film Festival	OCIC Award - Honorable mention	Daens	Won
1992	Valladolid International Film Festival	Golden Spike - Best film	Daens	Nominated
1992	Valladolid International Film Festival	Silver Spike - Best film	Daens	Won
1992	Valladolid International Film Festival	Audience award - Best film	Daens	Won
1992	Academy Awards	Oscar for Best Foreign Language Film	Daens	Nominated
1993	Shanghai International Film Festival	Best Film	Daens	Nominated
1993	Joseph Plateau Awards	Best Belgian Director	Daens	Won
1998	Joseph Plateau Awards	Best Belgian Director	Waar Blijft het Licht	Nominated
1999	Rouen Nordic Film Festival	Grand Jury Prize	Waar Blijft het Licht	Won
1999	Tromsø International Film Festival	Audience Award	Waar Blijft het Licht	Won
2004	Joseph Plateau Awards	Best Belgian Director	Verder dan de Maan	Nominated
2004	LUCAS – International Festival for Young Film Lovers	Don Quijote Award	Verder dan de Maan	Won
2004	LUCAS – International Festival for Young Film Lovers	C.I.F.E.J. Award	Verder dan de Maan	Won
2004	LUCAS – International Festival for Young Film Lovers	Best Film	Verder dan de Maan	Won
2013	Valladolid International Film Festival	Golden Spike - Best film	Marina	Won
2014	Emden International Film Festival	The Bernhard Wicki Award	Marina	Won
2014	Cabourg Film Festival	Youth Jury Prize	Marina	Won
2014	Ostend Film Festival	Best film	Marina	Won
2014	Ostend Film Festival	Best director	Marina	Won
2014	Ostend Film Festival	Best screenplay	Marina	Won
2014	Ostend Film Festival	Industry award	Marina	Won
2014	Ostend Film Festival	Audience award	Marina	Won
2019	Ostend Film Festival	Best screenplay	Niet Schieten	Nominated
2019	Ostend Film Festival	Ensor Award Best Director	Niet Schieten	Nominated
2019	Magritte Awards	Best Flemish Co-Production	Niet Schieten	Nominated
