= Captain Zeppos =

Belgian children's television series

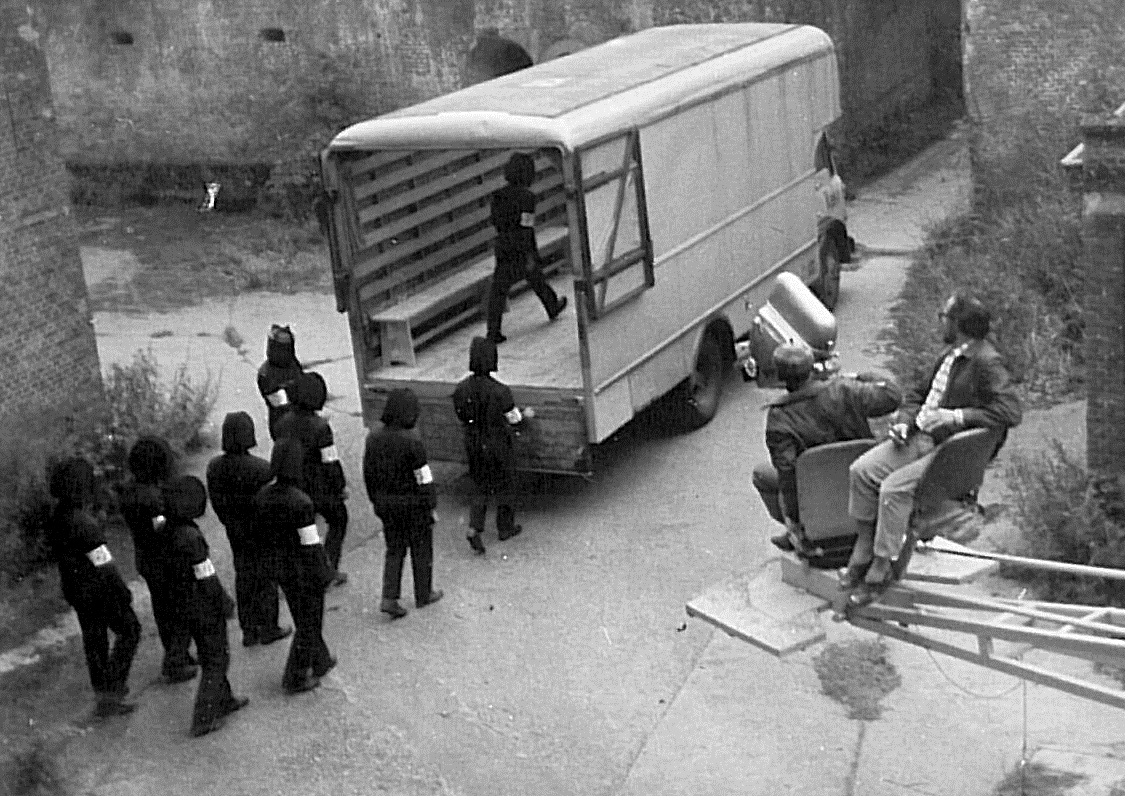
- Shooting of Kapitein Zeppos, 1968
- Genre: Children's series
- Theme music composer: Bert Kaempfert
- Opening theme: "Livin' It Up".
- Composers: Peter Thyssen; Maike Boerdam and others
- Country of origin: Belgium
- Original language: Dutch
- No. of episodes: 31

Production
- Running time: 30 minutes

Original release
- Network: BRT (nowadays the VRT)
- Release: 1964 – 1968

Captain Zeppos (Dutch: Kapitein Zeppos) was a Belgian children's television series, which aired in 1964 and 1968. It was based on a script by Lode De Groof. In all, the BRT made three series with a Flemish actor, Senne Rouffaer, in the title role. All episodes, except episode 16 which is a recap, have been released on DVD with Dutch subtitles and extras.

== Storylines ==
=== Series 1 – Belderbos – 15 episodes (1964) ===
A strange man arrives in Belder on horseback, and introduces himself as Captain Zeppos. Initially, he is met with suspicion and jealousy, but he soon befriends a local, Ben Kurrel. It becomes apparent that Zeppos had a motive to come to Belder: when in Greece a stranger had made him an offer on a piece of land he had inherited near the town. Ben Kurrel and his friend Rita Mees help him investigate the mystery.

=== Series 2 – De Eglantier – 8 episodes (1968) ===
Strange things happen in Belder - a group of hunters are regularly spotted around town, and Zeppos' wife Arianne meets 'Aunt Cara' a mysterious woman who can stand on her head. All seems to revolve around art theft in nearby churches.

=== Series 3 – Tweng – 8 episodes (1968) ===
Tweng is a pacifist organisation led by Mr Elias, who asks Zeppos to take charge of his cause, as he is lacking the strength to continue. His daughter Marleen is Tweng's secretary and will help Zeppos.

== Cast ==
- Senne Rouffaer - Captain Zeppos/Uncle Nico
- Raymond Bossaerts - Ben Kurrel
- Raymond Verhaeghe - Alfred Kurrel
- Jo Nupie - Agnès Kurrel/Erna
- Herman Smits - Roel Kurrel
- Alex Wilequet - Policeman
- Henriette Cabanier - Grandma
- Cyriel Van Gent - Gust the Postman
- Paula Sleyp - Slien
- Jan Reusens - Miel
- Truus Demedts - Rita Mees
- Fik Moeremans - Pukkel
- Vera Veroft - Ariane Despinal
- Robert Maes - Ivo/Baker Mees
- Rik Bravenboer - Ward/Policeman
- Marc Van Acker - Ben, as a boy
- Marc De Munck - Wim
- Fons Derre - Nelis, Forester
- Bart Rouffaer - Zeppos, as a child
- Jacques Germain - Plumber
- Alice Toen - Martha
- Dora van der Groen - Beatrice
- Ward de Ravet - Baral
- Jo Coppens - Blonde Frans/Slome Piet
- François Bernard - Marinus
- Jef Van Dalsen - Raf
- Jos Simons - Max
- Ivo Pauwels - Figaro
- Mary Boduin - Usherette
- Dolf Denis - Bernard Spriet
- Jackie Morel - Blonde Frans/Slome Piet
- René Peeters - Wittock
- Piet Herman - Notary
- R. Berghmans - Flower Girl
- Frank Struys - Postman
- André Delys - Policeman
- Hans Caprino - Black Person
- Jos Mahu - Doorman
- Mrs Schepers - Manageress
- Jaak Van Hombeek - Policeman
- Paul Van Roey - Drillmaster post
- Jaak Germain - Overseer

== Music ==
The theme tune for the series was 'Living it up', recorded by Bert Kaempfert and His Orchestra. Featuring Kaempfert's characteristic trumpet sound, it became very popular at the time the first series was airing.

== Cars ==
In series 1 Zeppos drove an Austin Champ ex-British Army Jeep style 4x4 vehicle powered by a Rolls-Royce engine. Zeppos drove an amphibious vehicle in series 2 and 3, resulting in this type of car being referred to as a 'Zeppos' in Flanders even years later.

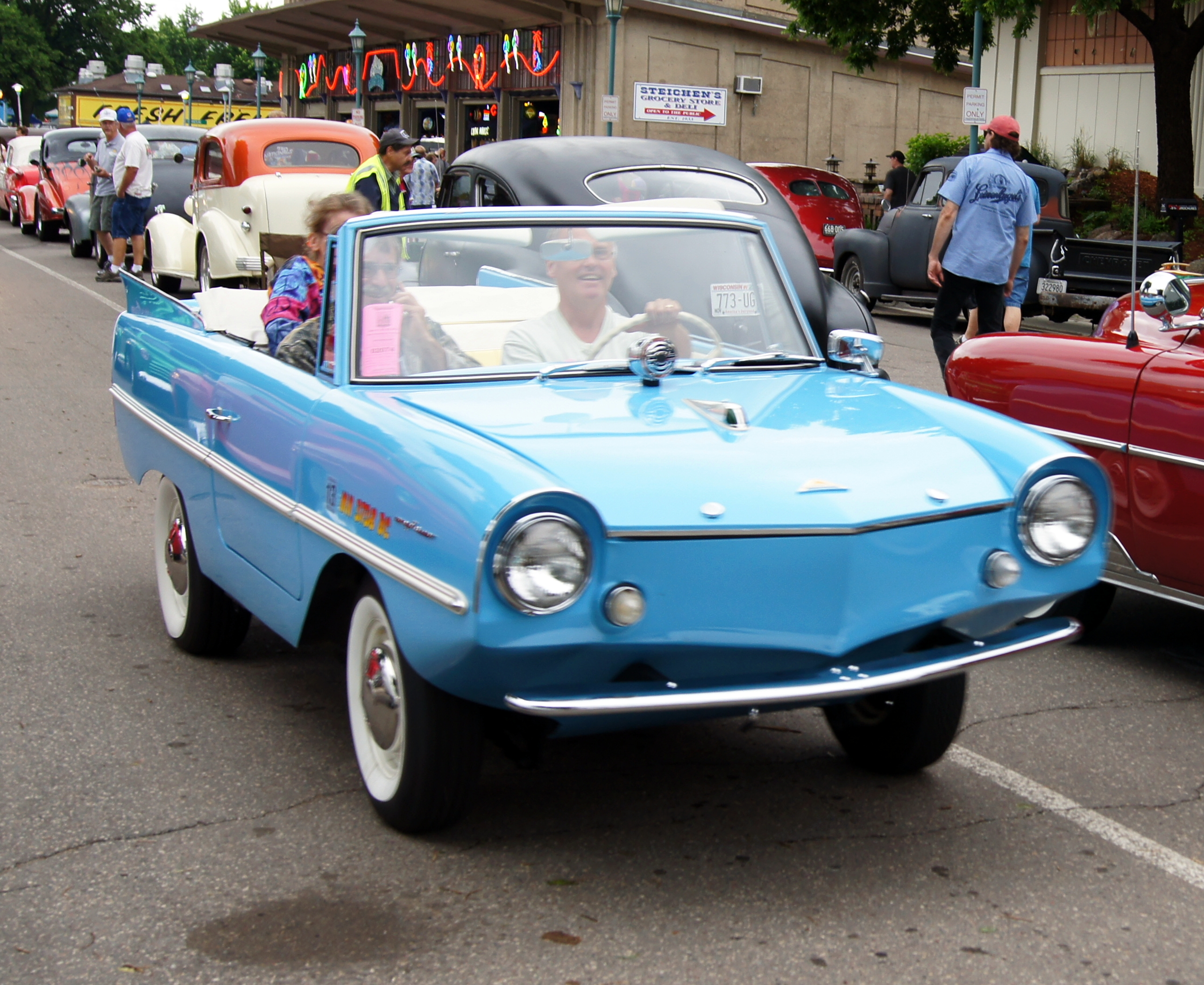
An Amphicar, the type of amphibious car driven by Zeppos

== Location shooting ==
Most of the location filming was done in Roosdaal in Flemish Brabant.

== In other languages/countries ==
Series 1 was dubbed into English and screened by the BBC from October 1966. The dubbed version was also shown in Australia, Canada, Ireland, Jamaica and New Zealand, and was subtitled for broadcast in Japan, Egypt, Hong Kong and Nigeria. Short clips of the English dub are shown as an extra on one of the DVD sets.

It was broadcast in the original Dutch in Belgium, the Netherlands and (with subtitles) in Sweden and Finland.

== In popular culture ==
There are commemorative Captain Zeppos cafés in both Amsterdam and Antwerp.
