= Baantjer, de film: De Cock en de wraak zonder einde =

1999 film

- Written by: A.C. Baantjer, Gerrit Mollema
- Directed by: Alain De Levita
- Country of origin: Netherlands
- Original language: Dutch

Production
- Running time: 70 minutes

Original release
- Release: 1999

Baantjer, de film: De Cock en de wraak zonder einde is a 1999 Dutch TV crime film directed by Alain De Levita. It features the characters of the crime TV series Baantjer.

== Cast ==
- Piet Römer ... Det. Juriaan 'Jurre' de Cock
- Victor Reinier ... Det. Dick Vledder
- Marian Mudder ... Det. Vera Prins
- Martin Schwab ... Det. Albert 'Appie Keizer
- Serge-Henri Valcke ... Com. Corneel Buitendam
- Hans Karsenbarg ... Dr. Ennaeus den Koninghe
- Freek van Muiswinkel... Watchman Thijs Jochems

== See also ==
- Amsterdam Vice (2019 film also based on Baantjer's work)
