= Amsterdam Vice =

2019 Dutch film directed by Arne Toonen

- Directed by: Arne Toonen
- Produced by: Rachel van Bommel
- Starring: Waldemar Torenstra; Fedja van Huêt; Tygo Gernandt
- Release date: 18 April 2019
- Countries: Netherlands; Belgium
- Language: Dutch

Amsterdam Vice (Dutch: Baantjer: Het Begin – English: Baantjer: The Beginning) is a 2019 Dutch film and accompanying series directed by Arne Toonen. The film and eponymous television series is based on the novels of A. C. Baantjer and a prequel to the television series Baantjer, based on the same novels.

The Videoland version of the film was edited as a double episode (episodes 1 and 2 of the series). However, a number of scenes are missing in this version. The film won the Golden Film award two weeks later after having sold 100,000 tickets. Kurt Loyens also won the Golden Calf for Best Production Design award at the 2019 Netherlands Film Festival. Amsterdam Vice was also awarded a Silver Remi Award 2020 winner by the WorldFest Houston in the category Feature Film – Crime/Drama and was selected for Festival de la Fiction de la Rochelle as a nominee in the category ‘best international series’.

== Plot ==
Amsterdam, 1980. It is a time of social change. Right in the middle of squatter riots and demonstrations, the young, idealistic detective Jurre de Cock begins working at the police station in the city's center. His partner Tonnie Montijn, who was born and raised in Amsterdam, makes de Cock familiar with the streets around the red light district. The two detectives stumble upon a criminal conspiracy, that turns out to be part of a larger plan. Then de Cock gets assigned a new partner; Andy Ruiter, who is transferred from another part of the city. In the meantime Amsterdam is being flooded with heavy guns and the police force isn't ready yet to fight organized crime. Not all detectives can be trusted. The crimes are turning more violent, the pressure is high and a wrong decision is easily made.

Amsterdam Vice is based upon the works by A.C. Baantjer.

== Episodes ==
Episode 1: Detective Jurre de Cock, who's from a small village, has his first day of work at the rough police station in the heart of Amsterdam. He is paired with Tonnie Montijn, who was born and raised in the city. Despite their differences, the two detectives respect each other and start to become friends. When de Cock meets Tonnie's sister Pien, a social activist, there is a spark.

Episode 2: De Cock and Montijn accidentally discover a plot within the squatters scene of Antwerp and Amsterdam that leads to plans of an attack during the coronation of the Dutch princess Beatrix. The detectives stumble upon a criminal conspiracy that seems part of an even bigger plan. Jurre is unsure if he can trust Tonnie when it becomes unclear which side he is on.

Episode 3: It's only been days since de Cock lost his partner, but there is no time to recover. He is teamed up with a new detective, the young Andy Ruiter, and a new murder case is already waiting for them. In the meantime their colleagues Baks and Van Kemmenade are trying to solve a violent robbery.

Episode 4: Amsterdam is flooded with heavy weapons. During a hit in a sex club in the red light district, a Turkish mob family has been taken out. Only one member survived the attack, the oldest son Hassan, who is now on the run. De Cock and Ruiter try to reconstruct what happened at the crime scene so they can trace Hassan.

Episode 5: Now De Cock fully understands the situation, LaCroix wants him to start a secret investigation into the missing weapons. After some hesitation, De Cock asks for her help with interrogating a person of interest. The information they gather finally leads De Cock and Ruiter to the key witness they have been looking for: Hassan. They offer him safety if he testifies against the criminals Looder and Wormgoor, who took out his entire family.

Episode 6: Chaos rules in the streets of Amsterdam when, all of a sudden, every teenager appears to be in possession of a gun. De Cock grows distrustful against his colleagues when his key witness Hassan is abducted from the safe house where he was in police custody. Shortly afterwards, they find his corpse. But there is no time to investigate. A young man named Theo wants revenge for what was done to his father during a tough interrogation led by LaCroix. He takes Andy and Selma hostage at the police station. Looder and Wormgoor discover a weapon of mass destruction between the goods they stole.

Episode 7: Looder turns up at the police station with important information about a chemical weapon. The hunt for his partner in crime Wormgoor leads de Cock and Ruiter to Belgium. With the aid of LaCroix and Flemish detective Elio, they try to intercept the weapon during a deal between Wormgoor and an infamous Flemish criminal.

Episode 8: Back in Amsterdam, there is no trace of Wormgoor and the chemical weapon he is trying to sell. In the meantime, the city is full with anti-nuclear demonstrators from all over the world. De Cock and Ruiter have to do everything in their power to prevent an attack with this weapon of mass destruction, but they find opposition from an unexpected side.

== Cast ==
- Waldemar Torenstra as Jurre de Cock
- Yannick Jozefzoon as Andy Ruiter
- Tygo Gernandt as Tonnie Montijn
- Fedja van Huêt as Bob Donkers
- Lisa Smit as Pien Montijn
- Robert de Hoog as Siem Looder
- Jelka van Houten as Station Sergeant Selma
- Ruben van der Meer as Detective Van Kemenade
- Peter Rene as Bank Employee
- Horace Cohen as Detective Baks
- Peter Bolhuis as Chief of Police
- Lindsay Zwaan as Tessie
- Loes Luca as Louise Montyn
- Raven van Dorst as Dr. Rusteloos

== See also ==
- Baantjer, de film: De Cock en de wraak zonder einde (1999 film also based on Baantjer's work)
