= Tom Van Landuyt =

Belgian actor and singer

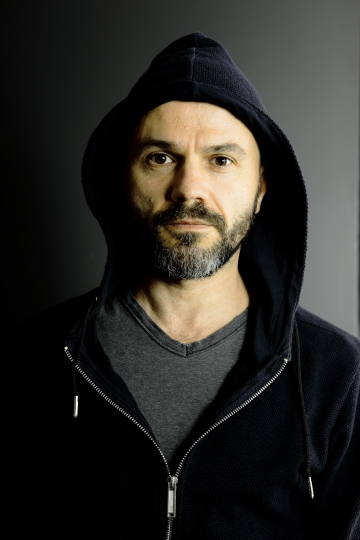
- Tom Van Landuyt (2016)
- Born: 7 May 1967 (age 59); Leuven, Belgium
- Occupations: actor, singer-songwriter, producer, director
- Years active: 1992–present

Tom Van Landuyt (born 7 May 1967) is a Belgian actor and singer probably best known for his role as Tom Smits in the Belgian drama film Ad Fundum. He has also starred in numerous Flemish movies, Television series and on stage. In 2002, he married the Dutch actress Angela Schijf.

== Early life ==
Van Landuyt was born in Leuven, Belgium. He was in training for actor at the Hoger Instituut voor Dramatische Kunsten (HIDK – Studio Herman Teirlinck) in Antwerp, where he graduated with honors in 1992.

== Career ==
In 1992, he starred as a leading actor in the film Ad Fundum, for which he also recorded four songs for the motion picture soundtrack, including a duet with the English female singer-songwriter Sam Brown.

In 1995, he played his first Shakespeare at the KNS (Koninklijke Nederlandse Schouwburg, the Royal Theatre Company in Antwerp) and released his first solo album Pig Party (songwriter, performer, and producer).

From 1997 till 2000 he was part of the NTG (Nedelands Toneel Gent, the Royal Theatre Company in Ghent), where he played leading roles in A Clockwork Orange, A Midsummer Night's Dream, Peter Pan, Spring Awakening, etc.

In 2000 and 2001 he worked with the Belgian theatre director Ivo van Hove, in a production (Rent) of the Dutch theatrical producer Joop van den Ende in Amsterdam.

In 2009, he wrote, performed, and produced a Dutch album called Man Zo Nu En Dan. That same year he produced and directed the music videos "Blanke Maagd" and "Vrijheid".

In 2013, he founded the theatre company Naastdeburen with his wife, Dutch actress Angela Schijf.

In 2015 he produced his first play Kreutzersonate, Als het verlangen maar stopt, an adaptation of Leo Tolstoy's novella The Kruetzer Sonata.

He works as a freelance actor at the theater company KVS Brussels and TG Broder.

== Filmography ==
Year	Title	Role	Director	Notes
1991	De Wet van Wyns	Zoon van Jean	Luc Wyns	TV series (4 episodes)
1991	Boys	Boy in dancing	Jan Verheyen	Film
1991–93	De Kotmadam	Billy	Ronnie Commissaris	TV series (31 episodes)
1993	Ad Fundum	Tom Smits	Erik Van Looy	Film
1994	Niet voor Publicatie	Marc	Willy Vanduren	TV series (1 episode)
1995	She Good Fighter	Dennis Davids	Marc Punt	Film
1995	Heterdaad	Frank Mattijsen	Frank Van Mechelen	TV series (1 episode)
1997	Windkracht 10	Jef De Laet	Erik Van Looy & Christian Vervaet	TV series (13 episodes)
1998	Alle Maten	Roel de Pitboel	Rik Daniëls & Vincent Rouffaer	TV series (1 episode)
2000	Teamspirit	Eric Bogaert	Jan Verheyen	Film
2000	Engeltjes	Dirk Feyen	Frank Van Mechelen	TV series (1 episode)
2001	Quix	Host	Several	TV show
2003	Sedes & Belli	Dirk Feyen	Christian Vervaet & Stef Desmyter	TV series (6 episodes)
2003	Teamspirit II	Eric Bogaerts	Jan Verheyen	Film
2003–06	Team Spirit	Eric Bogaerts	Christophe Van Rompay & Jan Verheyen	TV series (11 episodes); Also writer and producer TV Theme Song
2003–11	Zone Stad	Ruige Ronny	Christian Vervaet, Frank Bulkens, Johan Tiels, Iris Indri	TV series (51 episodes)
2004	Stroomversnellingen	Sjeng	Dalemans Brothers	Film
2005	De Wet volgens Milo	Philip	Guy Gossens	TV series (1 episode)
2006	Aspe	Andreas Duthoo	Mark De Geest & Frank Van Mechelen	TV series (1 episode)
2007	Wittekerke	Michiel Demeyer	Serge Bierset	TV series (6 episodes)
2007–08	Flikken Maastricht	Guy Danneels	Martin Schwab	TV series (3 episodes)
2010	Lellebelle	Vincent	Mischa Kamp	Film
2010	De Troon	Napoleon	Erik de Bruyn	TV mini series
2011	Witse	Joris Selleslags	Melinda Van Berlo	TV series (1 episode)
2012	Vermist	Thomas Malfliet	Cecilia Verheyden	TV series (1 episode)
2013	Crème de la Crème	Elvis Knaepen	Kim Van Oeteren	TV series (10 episodes)
2014	Lang Leve	Himself	Several	TV series (1 episodes)
2015–16	De Ridder	Karel De Coster	Tom Goris & Rik Daniëls	TV series (7 episodes)
2017	Tytgat Chocolat	Police Officer	Marc Bryssinck; Filip Lenaerts	TV series (2 episodes)
2020	Live as it should be	Bart	Ruud Schuurman	Film
2021	Human Factors	Police Officer	Ronny Trocker	Film

== Theatre ==
- Twelfth Night (Driekoningenavond, Koninklijke Nederlandse Schouwburg, KNS 1995)
- Sacco and Vanzetti (KBvV, musical, 1996)
- Gelukkige Verjaardag Jelena! (Koninklijk Jeugd Theater, KJT, 1997)
- A Midsummer Night's Dream (NTG, 1997)
- Spring Awakening (German: Frühlings Erwachen), NTG, 1998)
- Le Bal (NTG, 1998)
- A Clockwork Orange (NTG, 1998)
- Macbeth (Lennox, NTG, 1999)
- Peter Pan (NTG, 1999)
- Fun (Nederlands Toneel Gent – NTG, 2000)
- Rent (Joop van de Ende Theaterproducties, musical, 2000)
- Tintin (Kuifje, Tabas & Co, 2001)
- A Midsummer Night's Dream (De Paardenkathedraal Utrecht, 2007)
- Hannibal (t,arsenaal mechelen, 2013 )
- Amigos (t,arsenaal mechelen, 2014)
- Kreutzersonate, Als het verlangen maar stopt (Also co-writer and producer, adaptation of the novel The Kreutzer Sonata (Leo Tolstoy), naastdeburen – t,arsenaal mechelen, 2015–2016)
- Drarrie in de nacht, Jr.cE.sA.r (Junior Mthombeni, Cesar Janssens, Fikry El Azzouzi / KVS 2019)
- Wij de Verdronkenen (Walpurgis, Theater aan Zee (TAZ) 2021)
- Seaking (leading part, directed by Koen Boesman, TG Broder, 2023-2025)
- RISA (lead, directed by Junior Mthombeni, KVS Brussels, 2024)
- Vrijstaat Moresnet (lead, directed by Koen Boesman, Broder/Arca Ghent, 2025-2026)

== Voice-over career ==
Flemish voice

- Dinosaur (Buena Vista Disney, 2000)
- Titan after Earth (20th Century Fox, 2000)
- Spy Kids (2001)
- Six Flags Batman Show (2001)
- Lego big nana bird (2001)
- Barbie in the Nutcracker (Mattel, 2001)
- The Lion of Oz (2001)
- Spy Kids (Disney, 2002)
- Cats & Dogs (Warner Bros, 2002)
- Powerpuff Girls (Warner Bros, 2002)
- Scooby-Doo 1 (Warner Bros, 2002)
- The Road to El Dorado (DreamWorks – Spielberg, 2000)
- Looney tunes, back in action (Warner Bros, 2003)
- Home on the range, Paniek op de prairie (Disney, 2003)
- Sinbad, Legend of the Seven Seas (DreamWorks – Spielberg, 2003)
- Alvin and the chipmunks 2 (20th Century Fox, 2009)
- Het lelijke eendje (2005)
- Pitt & Kantrop (BBC/VRT, 2005)
- Cars (Disney Pixar, 2006)
- Bratz (2006)
- Brother Bear (Walt Disney Studios, 1998)
- The Prince of Egypt, De Prins van Egypte (DreamWorks – Spielberg, 1998)
- De Sprookjesverteller (2009)
- Beverly Hills Chihuahua 1 (Disney, 2009)
- Planet 51 (2010)
- Moeders Mooiste (2010)
- Beverly Hills Chihuahua 2 (Disney, 2010)
- Cats en dogs (De wraak van Kitty Galore, Warner Bros, 2010)
- Tad, the lost explorer (Op zoek naar de verloren stad, 2012)
- Beverly Hills Chihuahua 3 (Viva la Fiesta, Disney, 2012)
- Belle et Sébastian (Nicolas Vanier, 2013)

== Discography ==
- Ad Fundum (Motion Picture Soundtrack Ad Fundum, Standing in my light (feat. Sam Brown, writer, composer of the songs Come Home, Fly Away, Pig Party)
- Alles Leeft (Johan Verminnen live, 1994)
- Pig Party (writer, composer, producer of the songs Time, Solitude, It's Alright, Little Figure, Pig Party, Brother, What's about it 1, A Lie, Let's Go For Love, We Talk of Love, You've Got Me, Devils' Woman, Late September, What About It 2, 1995)
- Together (Windkracht 10, 1997)
- Sometimes love just ain't enough (duet with Barbara Dex, 1998)
- Hope Band (1998)
- Help Kosovo (1999)
- Rent (2000)
- Kuifje (2001)
- I won't let you go (writer, composer, producer, Ik laat je niet alleen, 2003)
- Blanke Maagd (writer, composer, producer, 2008)
- Man Zo Nu en Dan (writer, composer, producer of the songs Nu, Wandelende Mens, MeisjeMeisje, Herboren, Blanke Maagd, Minimens, Vrij, Bevrijd Me, Hier, Iedereen Verliefd, Gek, Vrijheid, 2009)
- Amigos (Verre Vrienden,2013)

== Producing career ==
- Pig Party (music album, 1995)
- Blanke Maagd (producer, director, music video, 2009)
- Vrijheid (producer, director, music video, 2009)
- Kreutzersonate, Als het verlangen maar stopt (also director of the trailer, 2014 and 2016)
- Kreutzersonate, Als het verlangen maar stopt (theatre play, 2015–2016)
- Secret Face (director, producer of the trailer, 2016)

== Presenter ==
At VRT

- Ad Fundum (Studio Brussel, 1992)
- Brieven Uit De Wereld (Studio Brussel, Yogyakarta, Java, Indonesia, 1997)
- Vlaanderen Vakantieland (BRTN, 1 episode, 1997)
- Quix (VRT, 2001)
- Vox Pop (VRT, 2004)

At VT4

- O.I.N.C. (1995, news and culture)
- Kickx (1996, action and adventure)
- Het Vuur van Wadi Rum (1999, adventure, Wadi Rum, Jordan)
