= List of Flikken Maastricht episodes =

This is a list of episodes of Flikken Maastricht.

== Series overview ==
Series	Episodes	Originally released	
Series	Episodes	First released	Last released
1	13	3 September 2007	26 November 2007
2	10	1 September 2008	3 November 2008
3	10	30 October 2009	22 January 2010
4	10	29 January 2010	23 April 2010
5	10	7 January 2011	11 March 2011
6	10	3 February 2012	6 April 2012
7	10	22 February 2013	26 April 2013
8	10	14 March 2014	16 May 2014
9	11	5 September 2014	14 November 2014
10	11	28 August 2015	6 November 2015
11	10	16 December 2016	17 February 2017
12	10	2 March 2018	27 April 2018
13	13	7 December 2018	1 March 2019
14	13	3 January 2020	27 March 2020
15	11	8 January 2021	19 March 2021
16	13	7 January 2022	1 April 2022
17	13	17 February 2023	19 May 2023
18	13	2 February 2024	26 April 2024
19	11	7 February 2025	25 April 2025
20	11	27 February 2026	8 May 2026

== Episodes ==
=== Season 1 ===
No. overall	No. in season	Title	Directed by	Written by	Original release date	Dutch viewers (millions)
1	1.01	"Een valse noot"	Pieter van Rijn	Kees Vroege, Pierre de Clercq	3 September 2007	1.290
2	1.02	"Een zaak met een luchtje"	Pieter van Rijn	Kees Vroege	10 September 2007	1.246
3	1.03	"Groeten uit Lagos"	Pieter van Rijn	Steven R. Thé	17 September 2007	1.187
4	1.04	"Kogelvis"	Pieter van Rijn	Kees Vroege	24 September 2007	1.153
5	1.05	"Alcohol maakt meer kapot"	Vincent Schuurman	Steven R. Thé & Victor Reinier	1 October 2007	1.274
6	1.06	"Kristalhelder"	Vincent Schuurman	Henk Apotheker	8 October 2007	1.330
7	1.07	"Een oude man"	Vincent Schuurman	Steven R. Thé	15 October 2007	1.410
8	1.08	"Broederliefde"	Vincent Schuurman	Simone Kome-van Breugel	22 October 2007	1.448
9	1.09	"Klappen"	Vincent Schuurman	Jan Harm Dekker	29 October 2007	1.423
10	1.10	"De gijzeling"	Martin Schwab	Henk Apotheker	5 November 2007	1.248
11	1.11	"Auto-maat" "Die jeugd van tegenwoordig"	Martin Schwab	Simone Kome-van Breugel	12 November 2007	1.336
12	1.12	"Britt (de roof 1)"	Martin Schwab	Jan Harm Dekker	19 November 2007	1.352
13	1.13	"Grensgeval (de roof 2)"	Martin Schwab	Henk Apotheker & Jan Harm Dekker	26 November 2007	1.391

=== Season 2 ===
No. overall	No. in season	Title	Directed by	Written by	Original release date	Dutch viewers (millions)
14	2.01	"Afgemaakt"	Vincent Schuurman	Henk Apotheker & Jan Harm Dekker	1 September 2008	986
15	2.02	"Angst"	Vincent Schuurman	Henk Apotheker & Jan Harm Dekker	8 September 2008	1.087
16	2.03	"Echte liefde"	Vincent Schuurman	Henk Apotheker & Jan Harm Dekker	15 September 2008	1.000
17	2.04	"Pillen"	Pieter van Rijn	Henk Apotheker & Jan Harm Dekker	22 September 2008	1.111
18	2.05	"Kidnap"	Pieter van Rijn	Henk Apotheker & Jan Harm Dekker	29 September 2008	1.244
19	2.06	"Verliefd"	Pieter van Rijn	Henk Apotheker & Jan Harm Dekker	6 October 2008	1.193
20	2.07	"Vermist"	Pieter van Rijn	Henk Apotheker & Jan Harm Dekker	13 October 2008	1.298
21	2.08	"Runners"	Martin Schwab	Henk Apotheker & Jan Harm Dekker	20 October 2008	1.351
22	2.09	"De bestorming"	Martin Schwab	Henk Apotheker & Jan Harm Dekker	27 October 2008	1.365
23	2.10	"Door het lint"	Martin Schwab	Henk Apotheker & Jan Harm Dekker	3 November 2008	1.330

=== Season 3 ===
No. overall	No. in season	Title	Directed by	Written by	Original release date	Dutch viewers (millions)
24	3.01	"Eeuwige trouw"	Vincent Schuurman	Henk Apotheker & Jan Harm Dekker	30 October 2009	1.874
25	3.02	"Spelletjes"	Vincent Schuurman	Henk Apotheker & Jan Harm Dekker & Simone Kome-van Breugel	6 November 2009	1.362
26	3.03	"Valse liefde"	Vincent Schuurman	Henk Apotheker & Jan Harm Dekker & Robert Jan Overeem	13 November 2009	1.301
27	3.04	"Eerwraak"	Martin Schwab	Henk Apotheker & Jan Harm Dekker & Simone Kome-van Breugel	20 November 2009	1.338
28	3.05	"Ambitie"	Martin Schwab	Henk Apotheker & Jan Harm Dekker & Jan Bernard Bussemaker	27 November 2009	1.371
29	3.06	"Kameraden"	Pieter van Rijn	Henk Apotheker & Jan Harm Dekker & Robert Jan Overeem	4 December 2009	1.271
30	3.07	"Stiekem"	Martin Schwab	Henk Apotheker & Jan Harm Dekker	11 December 2009	1.301
31	3.08	"Dubbelspel"	Martin Schwab	Henk Apotheker & Jan Harm Dekker	8 January 2010	1.574
32	3.09	"Geld (1)"	Pieter van Rijn	Henk Apotheker & Jan Harm Dekker	15 January 2010	1.476
33	3.10	"Geld (2)"	Pieter van Rijn	Henk Apotheker & Jan Harm Dekker	22 January 2010	1.417

=== Season 4 ===
No. overall	No. in season	Title	Directed by	Written by	Original release date	Dutch viewers (millions)
34	4.01	"Optreden"	Pieter van Rijn	Henk Apotheker & Jan Harm Dekker	29 January 2010	1.630
35	4.02	"Jagers"	Pieter van Rijn	Henk Apotheker & Jan Harm Dekker & Simone Kome-van Breugel	5 February 2010	1.524
36	4.03	"Heksen"	Pieter van Rijn	Henk Apotheker & Jan Harm Dekker & Simone Kome-van Breugel	5 March 2010	1.308
37	4.04	"Vuil spel"	Vincent Schuurman	Maarten van der Duin	12 March 2010	1.494
38	4.05	"Huis en haard"	Vincent Schuurman	Maarten van der Duin	19 March 2010	1.589
39	4.06	"Verkracht"	Vincent Schuurman	Maarten van der Duin	26 March 2010	1.745
40	4.07	"Ripdeal"	Martin Schwab	Henk Apotheker & Jan Harm Dekker	2 April 2010	1.638
41	4.08	"Ome Will"	Martin Schwab	Henk Apotheker & Jan Harm Dekker	9 April 2010	1.676
42	4.09	"Alarm"	Martin Schwab	Henk Apotheker & Jan Harm Dekker	16 April 2010	1.692
43	4.10	"Hangen"	Martin Schwab	Henk Apotheker & Jan Harm Dekker	23 April 2010	1.703

=== Season 5 ===
No. overall	No. in season	Title	Directed by	Written by	Original release date	Dutch viewers (millions)
44	5.01	"Begraven"	Pieter van Rijn	Jan Harm Dekker & Henk Apotheker	7 January 2011	1.890
45	5.02	"Geript"	Pieter van Rijn	Jan Harm Dekker & Henk Apotheker	14 January 2011	1.945
46	5.03	"Verzorgd"	Pieter van Rijn	Jan Harm Dekker & Henk Apotheker	21 January 2011	1.745
47	5.04	"Ontspoord"	Pieter van Rijn	Jan Harm Dekker & Henk Apotheker	28 January 2011	1.725
48	5.05	"Wie zaait..."	Martin Schwab	Simone Kome-van Breugel & Jan Harm Dekker & Henk Apotheker	4 February 2011	1.768
49	5.06	"Huwelijk op de Maas"	Martin Schwab	Jan Harm Dekker & Henk Apotheker	11 February 2011	1.664
50	5.07	"Nieuwe wijn"	Martin Schwab	Jan Harm Dekker & Henk Apotheker	18 February 2011	1.754
51	5.08	"Aangereden"	Martin Schwab	Bert Bouma & Jan Harm Dekker & Henk Apotheker	25 February 2011	1.683
52	5.09	"Inkom"	Martin Schwab	Robert Jan Overeem & Jan Harm Dekker & Henk Apotheker	4 March 2011	1.803
53	5.10	"Schuld"	Martin Schwab	Jan Harm Dekker & Henk Apotheker	11 March 2011	2.201

=== Season 6 ===
No. overall	No. in season	Title	Directed by	Written by	Original release date	Dutch viewers (millions)
54	6.01	"Een nieuw begin"	Martin Schwab	Jan Harm Dekker & Bert Bouma	3 February 2012	1.733
55	6.02	"Slangenkop"	Martin Schwab	Jan Harm Dekker & Marly van Otterloo & Myranda Jongeling	10 February 2012	1.688
56	6.03	"Gif"	Martin Schwab	Jan Harm Dekker & Robert Jan Overeem	17 February 2012	1.736
57	6.04	"Baby Gaga"	Martin Schwab	Jan Harm Dekker & Marly van Otterloo & Myranda Jongeling	24 February 2012	1.767
58	6.05	"Kindermenu"	Martin Schwab	Jan Harm Dekker & Simone Kome-van Breugel & Robert Jan Overeem	2 March 2012	1.637
59	6.06	"Vals spel"	Martin Schwab	Jan Harm Dekker & Robert Jan Overeem	9 March 2012	1.641
60	6.07	"Lief en leed"	Martin Schwab	Jan Harm Dekker & Robert Jan Overeem	16 March 2012	1.632
61	6.08	"Lokaas"	Pieter Walther Boer	Jan Harm Dekker & Robert Jan Overeem	23 March 2012	1.647
62	6.09	"Heden en verleden"	Pieter Walther Boer	Jan Harm Dekker & Bert Bouma	30 March 2012	1.615
63	6.10	"Patsy"	Pieter Walther Boer	Jan Harm Dekker & Henk Apotheker	6 April 2012	1.934

=== Season 7 ===
No. overall	No. in season	Title	Directed by	Written by	Original release date	Dutch viewers (millions)
64	7.01	"Oud zeer"	Martin Schwab	Marly van Otterloo & Myranda Jongeling & Jan Harm Dekker	22 February 2013	2.031
65	7.02	"Amok"	Martin Schwab	Henk Apotheker & Jan Harm Dekker	1 March 2013	2.123
66	7.03	"De spin"	Martin Schwab	Bert Bouma & Jan Harm Dekker	8 March 2013	2.024
67	7.04	"Broos"	Martin Schwab	Lidewij Martens & Jan Harm Dekker	15 March 2013	2.250
68	7.05	"Copycat"	Martin Schwab	Simone Kome-van Breugel & Jan Harm Dekker	22 March 2013	1.953
69	7.06	"Mooi"	Victor Reinier	Victor Reinier	29 March 2013	2.120
70	7.07	"Alert"	Martin Schwab	Henk Apotheker & Jan Harm Dekker	5 April 2013	1.839
71	7.08	"Hawala"	Pieter van Rijn	Bert Bouma & Jan Harm Dekker	12 April 2013	1.737
72	7.09	"Eigenrichting"	Pieter van Rijn	Robert Jan Overeem & Jan Harm Dekker	19 April 2013	1.773
73	7.10	"Shock"	Pieter van Rijn	Henk Apotheker & Jan Harm Dekker	26 April 2013	1.679

=== Season 8 ===
No. overall	No. in season	Title	Directed by	Written by	Original release date	Dutch viewers (millions)
74	8.01	"Dilemma"	Martin Schwab	Jan Harm Dekker	14 March 2014	2.356
75	8.02	"Vlucht"	Martin Schwab	Henk Apotheker & Jan Harm Dekker	21 March 2014	2.355
76	8.03	"Verraad"	Martin Schwab	Henk Apotheker & Jan Harm Dekker	28 March 2014	2.361
77	8.04	"Mineur"	Martin Schwab	Victor Reinier	4 April 2014	2.150
78	8.05	"Djellaba"	Martin Schwab	Henk Apotheker & Jan Harm Dekker	11 April 2014	2.202
79	8.06	"Privé"	Martin Schwab	Liesbeth Wieggers & Jan Harm Dekker	18 April 2014	1.824
80	8.07	"Belaagd"	Pieter van Rijn	Simone Kome-van Breugel, Jan Harm Dekker & Henk Apotheker	25 April 2014	1.796
81	8.08	"Stenen"	Pieter van Rijn	Henk Apotheker & Jan Harm Dekker	2 May 2014	2.156
82	8.09	"Ciao"	Victor Reinier	Victor Reinier	9 May 2014	2.163
83	8.10	"De aanslag"	Pieter van Rijn	Jan Harm Dekker	16 May 2014	2.137

=== Season 9 ===
No. overall	No. in season	Title	Directed by	Written by	Original release date	Dutch viewers (millions)
84	9.01	"Verdacht"	Martin Schwab	Jan Harm Dekker	5 September 2014	2.132
85	9.02	"De trappen"	Martin Schwab	Jan Harm Dekker & Henk Apotheker	12 September 2014	2.175
86	9.03	"Truckstop"	Martin Schwab	Bert Bouma & Jan Harm Dekker	19 September 2014	2.128
87	9.04	"Paardenkracht"	Pieter van Rijn	Bert Bouma & Jan Harm Dekker	26 September 2014	2.195
88	9.05	"Wraak"	Pieter van Rijn	Robert Jan Overeem & Jan Harm Dekker	3 October 2014	2.211
89	9.06	"Gevoel"	Victor Reinier	Victor Reinier	10 October 2014	2.169
90	9.07	"Stockholm"	Pieter van Rijn	Robert Jan Overeem & Jan Harm Dekker	17 October 2014	2.247
91	9.08	"Bedrog"	Martin Schwab	Lidewij Martens & Jan Harm Dekker	24 October 2014	2.429
92	9.09	"DNA"	Martin Schwab	Lidewij Martens & Jan Harm Dekker	31 October 2014	2.281
93	9.10	"Exit"	Martin Schwab	Bennie Roeters & Jan Harm Dekker	7 November 2014	2.311
94	9.11	"Strizzacervelli"	Pieter van Rijn	Henk Apotheker & Jan Harm Dekker	14 November 2014	2.125

=== Season 10 ===
No. overall	No. in season	Title	Directed by	Written by	Original release date	Dutch viewers (millions)
95	10.01	"Overvallen"	Pieter van Rijn	Henk Apotheker & Jan Harm Dekker	28 August 2015	2.004
96	10.02	"Het model"	Pieter van Rijn	Simone Kome-van Breugel & Jan Harm Dekker	4 September 2015	2.120
97	10.03	"Gekte"	Martin Schwab	Robert Jan Overeem & Jan Harm Dekker	11 September 2015	1.775
98	10.04	"De voortvluchtige"	Pieter van Rijn	Simone Kome-van Breugel & Jan Harm Dekker	18 September 2015	2.184
99	10.05	"Stappen"	Martin Schwab	Wolter Muller, Reint Schölvinck & Jan Harm Dekker	25 September 2015	2.170
100	10.06	"Het dispuut"	Martin Schwab	Michiel Hanrath & Jan Harm Dekker	2 October 2015	2.190
101	10.07	"De wethouder"	Martin Schwab	Liesbeth Wieggers & Jan Harm Dekker	9 October 2015	2.190
102	10.08	"Plan B"	Martin Schwab	Henk Apotheker & Jan Harm Dekker	16 October 2015	2.161
103	10.09	"Het stuk"	Aniëlle Webster	Robert Jan Overeem & Jan Harm Dekker	23 October 2015	1.731
104	10.10	"Klem"	Aniëlle Webster	Henk Apotheker & Jan Harm Dekker	30 October 2015	2.115
105	10.11	"Safe?"	Victor Reinier	Jan Harm Dekker	6 November 2015	1.766

=== Season 11 ===
No. overall	No. in season	Title	Directed by	Written by	Original release date	Dutch viewers (millions)
106	11.01	"Opgejaagd"	Pieter van Rijn	Henk Apotheker & Jan Harm Dekker	16 December 2016	1.713
107	11.02	"Ontsnapt"	Pieter van Rijn	Henk Apotheker & Jan Harm Dekker	23 December 2016	1.865
108	11.03	"Retraite"	Martin Schwab	Robert Jan Overeem & Jan Harm Dekker	30 December 2016	1.870
109	11.04	"Plaatselijk belang"	Martin Schwab	Henk Apotheker & Jan Harm Dekker	6 January 2017	1.717
110	11.05	"Undercover"	Martin Schwab	Bert Bouma & Jan Harm Dekker	13 January 2017	1.946
111	11.06	"Blijf van m'n lijf"	Martin Schwab	Lidewij Martens & Jan Harm Dekker	20 January 2017	1.993
112	11.07	"The last vlog"	Martin Schwab	Robert Jan Overeem & Jan Harm Dekker	27 January 2017	1.946
113	11.08	"Donor"	Martin Schwab	Gaby van der Linden & Jan Harm Dekker	3 February 2017	1.927
114	11.09	"Zuur"	Pieter van Rijn	Henk Apotheker & Jan Harm Dekker	10 February 2017	1.934
115	11.10	"De keuze"	Pieter van Rijn	Henk Apotheker & Jan Harm Dekker	17 February 2017	1.993

=== Season 12 ===
No. overall	No. in season	Title	Directed by	Written by	Original release date	Dutch viewers (millions)
116	12.01	"Wolfs"	Victor Reinier	Victor Reinier	2 March 2018	1.911
117	12.02	"Eva"	Victor Reinier	Robert Jan Overeem & Jan Harm Dekker	9 March 2018	1.759
118	12.03	"Verlossing"	Martin Schwab	Robert Jan Overeem & Jan Harm Dekker	16 March 2018	1.864
119	12.04	"Cold case"	Martin Schwab	Bert Bouma & Jan Harm Dekker	23 March 2018	1.762
120	12.05	"Bedrogen"	Martin Schwab	Robert Jan Overeem & Jan Harm Dekker	30 March 2018	1.982
121	12.06	"Valkuilen"	Martin Schwab	Henk Apotheker & Jan Harm Dekker	6 April 2018	1.700
122	12.07	"Familie"	Martin Schwab	Michiel Hanrath & Jan Harm Dekker	13 April 2018	1.748
123	12.08	"Oud zeer"	Martin Schwab	Gaby van der Linden & Jan Harm Dekker	20 April 2018	1.638
124	12.09	"Koekoeksnest (Bols 1)"	Pieter van Rijn	Robert Jan Overeem & Jan Harm Dekker	27 April 2018	1.755
125	12.10	"Verslagen (Bols 2)"	Pieter van Rijn	Robert Jan Overeem & Jan Harm Dekker	27 April 2018	1.755

=== Season 13 ===
No. overall	No. in season	Title	Directed by	Written by	Original release date	Dutch viewers (millions)
126	13.01	"Dope sucks"	Martin Schwab	Jan Harm Dekker	7 December 2018	1.682
127	13.02	"Marion"	Victor Reinier	Victor Reinier	14 December 2018	1.743
128	13.03	"Zaad"	Martin Schwab	Bert Bouma & Jan Harm Dekker	21 December 2018	1.782
129	13.04	"Jongens"	Martin Schwab	Henk Apotheker & Jan Harm Dekker	28 December 2018	1.792
130	13.05	"Stroom"	Pollo de Pimentel	Henk Apotheker & Jan Harm Dekker	4 January 2019	1.993
131	13.06	"Dood van een bankier"	Pollo de Pimentel	Henk Apotheker & Jan Harm Dekker	11 January 2019	1.919
132	13.07	"Schorpioen"	Pollo de Pimentel	Gaby van der Linden & Jan Harm Dekker	18 January 2019	1.741
133	13.08	"Hankie"	Pieter van Rijn	Michiel Hanrath & Jan Harm Dekker	25 January 2019	1.765
134	13.09	"Heroïne"	Pieter van Rijn	Henk Apotheker & Jan Harm Dekker	1 February 2019	1.728
135	13.10	"Dagboek"	Oda Spelbos	Michiel van Jaarsveld & Jan Harm Dekker	8 February 2019	1.902
136	13.11	"Rehab"	Martin Schwab	Jan Harm Dekker	15 February 2019	1.043
137	13.12	"Fake news"	Martin Schwab	Michiel van Jaarsveld & Jan Harm Dekker	22 February 2019	1.380
138	13.13	"Virtus et Justitia"	Martin Schwab	Henk Apotheker & Jan Harm Dekker	1 March 2019	1.370

=== Season 14 ===
No. overall	No. in season	Title	Directed by	Written by	Original release date	Dutch viewers (millions)
139	14.01	"Vertrouwen 1"	Martin Schwab	Victor Reinier	3 January 2020	1.333
140	14.02	"Vertrouwen 2"	Martin Schwab	Jan Harm Dekker	10 January 2020	1.443
141	14.03	"Safehouse"	Martin Schwab	Bert Bouma & Jan Harm Dekker	17 January 2020	1.437
142	14.04	"Monnikskap"	Pieter van Rijn	Allard Bekker & Jan Harm Dekker	24 January 2020	1.255
143	14.05	"Recidive"	Pieter van Rijn	Henk Apotheker & Jan Harm Dekker	31 January 2020	1.190
144	14.06	"Jazz"	Pieter van Rijn	Robert Jan Overeem & Jan Harm Dekker	7 February 2020	1.284
145	14.07	"De parasiet"	Victor Reinier	Allard Bekker	14 February 2020	1.323
146	14.08	"PGP"	Martin Schwab	Wim Hoen & Jan Harm Dekker	21 February 2020	1.262
147	14.09	"Museum"	Martin Schwab	Anne-Gine Goemans & Jan Harm Dekker	28 February 2020	1.370
148	14.10	"Wie met het zwaard omgaat..."	Oda Spelbos	Robert Jan Overeem & Jan Harm Dekker	6 March 2020	1.383
149	14.11	"Bonny & Clyde"	Pieter van Rijn	Henk Apotheker & Jan Harm Dekker	13 March 2020	1.356
150	14.12	"Barcode"	Pieter van Rijn	Jan Harm Dekker	20 March 2020	1.835
151	14.13	"Dewulf"	Pieter van Rijn	Jan Harm Dekker	27 March 2020	1.698

=== Season 15 ===
No. overall	No. in season	Title	Directed by	Written by	Original release date	Dutch viewers (millions)
152	15.01	"Gerechtigheid"	Pieter van Rijn	Jan Harm Dekker	8 January 2021	1.698
153	15.02	"Vuurdoop"	Pieter van Rijn	Jan Harm Dekker	15 January 2021	1.644
154	15.03	"De fantast"	Martin Schwab	Jan Harm Dekker & Anne-Gine Goemans	22 January 2021	1.465
155	15.04	"De laatste date"	Oda Spelbos	Bert Bouma & Jan Harm Dekker	29 January 2021	1.883
156	15.05	"De kanoman"	Pieter van Rijn	Jan Harm Dekker & Michiel van Jaarsveld	5 February 2021	1.843
157	15.06	"Camping"	Victor Reinier	Victor Reinier	12 February 2021	1.756
158	15.07	"Moord op de president"	Pieter van Rijn	Jan Harm Dekker & Michiel van Jaarsveld	19 February 2021	1.923
159	15.08	"Piggy hunt"	Martin Schwab	Allard Bekker	26 February 2021	1.779
160	15.09	"Dead zone"	Martin Schwab	Jan Harm Dekker	5 March 2021	1.809
161	15.10	"Hoop sterft het laatst - 1"	Pieter van Rijn	Allard Bekker & Victor Reinier	12 March 2021	2.012
162	15.11	"Hoop sterft het laatst - 2"	Pieter van Rijn	Allard Bekker & Victor Reinier	19 March 2021	1.865

=== Season 16 ===
No. overall	No. in season	Title	Directed by	Written by	Original release date	Dutch viewers (millions)
163	16.01	"Resurrectie"	Martin Schwab	Jan Harm Dekker	7 January 2022	1.597
164	16.02	"Moord aan de hemelpoort"	Martin Schwab	Victor Reinier & Allard Bekker	14 January 2022	1.719
165	16.03	"Sprookje"	Martin Schwab	Allard Bekker	21 January 2022	1.616
166	16.04	"Hypersensitiviteit"	Martin Schwab	Robert Jan Overeem & Jan Harm Dekker	28 January 2022	1.588
167	16.05	"Brand"	Martin Schwab	Anne-Gine Goemans & Jan Harm Dekker	4 February 2022	1.640
168	16.06	"Waakzaam"	Martin Schwab	Robert Jan Overeem & Jan Harm Dekker	11 February 2022	1.629
169	16.07	"Gebrek aan bewijs"	Oda Spelbos	Allard Bekker	18 February 2022	1.914
170	16.08	"Koks"	Pollo de Pimentel	Bert Bouma & Jan Harm Dekker	25 February 2022	1.634
171	16.09	"Golf"	Pollo de Pimentel	Robert Jan Overeem & Jan Harm Dekker	4 March 2022	1.582
172	16.10	"Catfishers"	Pollo de Pimentel	Allard Bekker	11 March 2022	1.491
173	16.11	"Wanhoop"	Pieter van Rijn	Allard Bekker	18 March 2022	1.456
174	16.12	"Donkersloot"	Pieter van Rijn	Jan Harm Dekker	25 March 2022	1.529
175	16.13	"Remise"	Pieter van Rijn	Jan Harm Dekker	1 April 2022	1.616

=== Season 17 ===
No. overall	No. in season	Title	Directed by	Written by	Original release date	Dutch viewers (millions)
176	17.01	"De val"	Pieter van Rijn	Allard Bekker	17 February 2023	1.673
177	17.02	"Rehabilitatie"	Pieter van Rijn	Allard Bekker	24 February 2023	1.535
178	17.03	"Schutters"	Pieter van Rijn	Kirsten van Dissel & Jan Harm Dekker	3 March 2023	1.269
179	17.04	"Monddood"	Pollo de Pimentel	Brian de Vore & Jan Harm Dekker	10 January 2023	1.520
180	17.05	"Grafschenners"	Pollo de Pimentel	Robert Jan Overeem & Jan Harm Dekker	17 March 2023	1.580
181	17.06	"Nico"	Pollo de Pimentel	Allard Bekker	24 March 2023	1.234
182	17.07	"Schuld en boete"	Martin Schwab	Allard Bekker	31 March 2023	1.516
183	17.08	"Alibi"	Pieter van Rijn	Anne-Gine Goemans & Jan Harm Dekker	7 April 2023	1.403
184	17.09	"Uitlevering"	Pieter van Rijn	Bert Bouma & Jan Harm Dekker	14 April 2023	1.547
185	17.10	"Alte kameraden"	Martin Schwab	Jan Harm Dekker	21 April 2023	1.437
186	17.11	"Barsten"	Victor Reinier	Victor Reinier	28 April 2023	1.443
187	17.12	"Vreemdgangers"	Oda Spelbos	Robert Jan Overeem & Jan Harm Dekker	12 May 2023	1.337
188	17.13	"Maurice"	Pieter van Rijn	Jan Harm Dekker	19 May 2023	1.305

=== Season 18 ===
No. overall	No. in season	Title	Directed by	Written by	Original release date	Dutch viewers (millions)
189	18.01	"Masker 19"	Pollo de Pimentel	Allard Bekker	2 February 2024	1.860
190	18.02	"Beste vrienden"	Pollo de Pimentel	Allard Bekker	9 February 2024	1.766
191	18.03	"Juice"	Pollo de Pimentel	Allard Bekker	16 February 2024	1.641
192	18.04	"Larry Konings"	Oda Spelbos	Ger Apeldoorn, Robert Jan Overeem & Jan Harm Dekker	23 February 2024	1.724
193	18.05	"Beschuldigd"	Annemarie de Mond	Bert Bouma	1 March 2024	1.723
194	18.06	"Jaloezie"	Annemarie de Mond	Brian de Vore & Jan Harm Dekker	8 March 2024	1.664
195	18.07	"Gangsters"	Annemarie de Mond	Henk Apotheker & Jan Harm Dekker	15 March 2024	1.700
196	18.08	"Asiel"	Pieter van Rijn	Anne-Gine Goemans, Astrid van Keulen & Jan Harm Dekker	22 March 2024	1.696
197	18.09	"Tuig"	Victor Reinier	Victor Reinier	29 March 2024	1.652
198	18.10	"Leviticus 18:22"	Pieter van Rijn	Allard Bekker	5 April 2024	1.725
199	18.11	"Ontvoerd"	Pieter van Rijn	Allard Bekker	12 April 2024	1.606
200	18.12	"Cluster B"	Pieter van Rijn	Allard Bekker	19 April 2024	1.748
201	18.13	"Vendetta"	Pieter van Rijn	Jan Harm Dekker & Henk Apotheker	26 April 2024	1.579

=== Season 19 ===
No. overall	No. in season	Title	Directed by	Written by	Original release date	Dutch viewers (millions)
202	19.01	"Ellis"	Pieter van Rijn	Allard Bekker	7 February 2025	1.817
203	19.02	"Milieu"	Annemarie de Mond	Allard Bekker	14 February 2025	1.714
204	19.03	"Koor"	Annemarie de Mond	Robert Jan Overeem & Jan Harm Dekker	28 February 2025	1.496
205	19.04	"Nevenschade"	Annemarie de Mond	Allard Bekker	7 March 2025	1.476
206	19.05	"Ongeïdentificeerd"	Oda Spelbos	Astrid van Keulen & Jan Harm Dekker	14 March 2025	1.529
207	19.06	"Protocol"	Victor Reinier	Victor Reinier	21 March 2025	1.635
208	19.07	"Onzichtbaar"	Martin Schwab	Allard Bekker	28 March 2025	1.499
209	19.08	"Ziek"	Martin Schwab	Henk Apotheker & Jan Harm Dekker	4 April 2025	1.457
210	19.09	"Diamanten"	Martin Schwab	Bert Bouma & Jan Harm Dekker	11 April 2025	1.620
211	19.10	"De Beaujean"	Pieter van Rijn	Allard Bekker	18 April 2025	1.514
212	19.11	"Korte metten"	Pieter van Rijn	Jan Harm Dekker	25 April 2025	1.443

=== Season 20 ===
No. overall	No. in season	Title	Directed by	Written by	Original release date	Dutch viewers (millions)
213	20.01	"De langste dag"	Annemarie van de Mond	Allard Bekker	27 February 2026	1.919
214	20.02	"Rust in vrede"	Pieter van Rijn	Allard Bekker	6 March 2026	1.653
215	20.03	"IJzeren Rijn"	Pieter van Rijn	Allard Bekker	13 March 2026	N/A
216	20.04	"Hebzucht"	Martin Schwab	Bert Bouma & Jan Harm Dekker	20 March 2026	N/A
217	20.05	"De exorcist"	Martin Schwab	Bert Bouma & Jan Harm Dekker	27 March 2026	N/A
218	20.06	"Man in de war"	Oda Spelbos	Jan Harm Dekker & Robert Jan Overeem	3 April 2026	TBD
219	20.07	"Incel"	Martin Schwab	Allard Bekker	10 April 2026	TBD
220	20.08	"Helemaal onderaan"	Martin Schwab	Robert Jan Overeem & Jan Harm Dekker	17 April 2026	TBD
221	20.09	"Eindhoven"	Pieter van Rijn	Allard Bekker	24 April 2026	TBD
222	20.10	"Bitcoins"	Pieter van Rijn	Jan Harm Dekker	1 May 2026	TBD
223	20.11	"Russische roulette"	Pieter van Rijn	Jan Harm Dekker	8 May 2026	TBD
