= Wimie Wilhelm =

Dutch actress and film director (1961–2023)

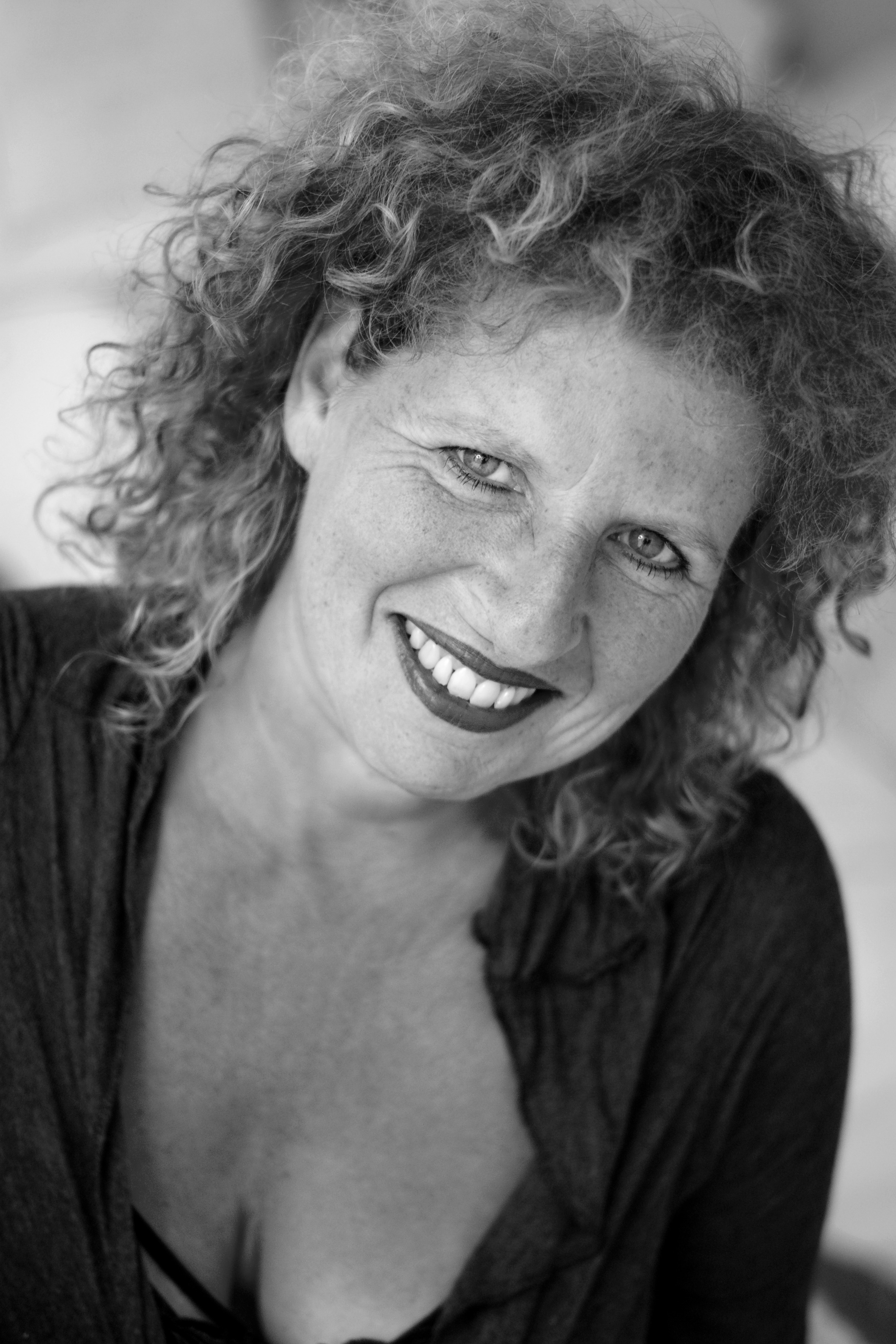
- Wilhelm in 2008
- Born: Wilhelmina Johanna Berndina Wilhelm; 21 August 1961; Amsterdam, Netherlands
- Died: 16 September 2023 (aged 62); Amsterdam, Netherlands
- Occupations: Actress; Film director

Wilhelmina Johanna Berndina "Wimie" Wilhelm (21 August 1961 – 16 September 2023) was a Dutch actress and film director.

Wilhelm also worked as a cabaret artist. She died of cancer in Amsterdam on 16 September 2023, at the age of 62.

== Filmography ==
- Niemand de deur uit! (1992)
- Madelief (1994)
- Antonia's Line (1995)
- Baantjer (2000–2006)
- Missing Link (1999)
- Little Crumb (1999)
- Blauw blauw (2000)
- Wildschut & De Vries (2000)
- De vloer op (2000)
- Najib en Julia (2003)
- Deuce Bigalow: European Gigolo (2005)
- Gooische Vrouwen (2005)
- Black Book (2006)
- Dennis P. (2007)
- De co-assistent (2007–2009)
- Hitte/Harara (2008)
- Kikkerdril (2009)
- S1NGLE (2009)
- Nothing Personal (2009)
- Toren C (2010)
- Koen Kampioen (2012)
- Dokter Tinus (2013)
- IJspaard (2014)
- Nieuwe buren (2014)
- Flikken Maastricht (2015)
- Familieweekend (2016)
- Ferry- Serie [nl] (2023)
