= Mudder =

Mudder may refer to:

- A participant in:
  - Mud bogging, a form of off-road motorsport
  - Multi-user dungeon, an online game
  - Obstacle course racing, a sport in which competitors on foot must overcome obstacles including mud
    - Tough Mudder, an endurance event series
- A racehorse that performs well on muddy or wet tracks
- A character in "Jaynestown", an episode of the science fiction television series Firefly
- Marian Mudder, Dutch actor and author
