= Angela Schijf =

Dutch actress

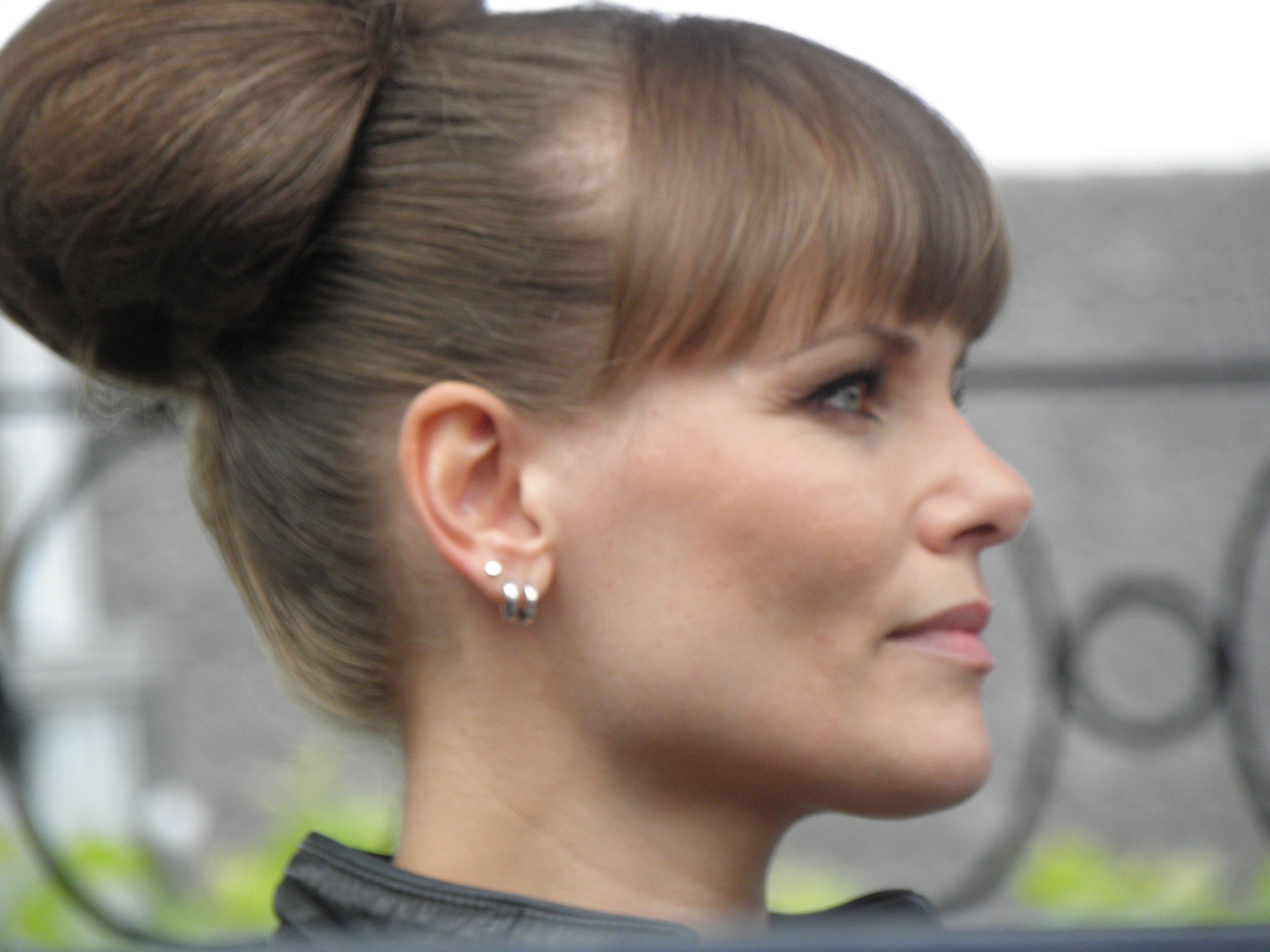
- Born: Uithoorn, Netherlands
- Known for: Flikken Maastricht; Goede tijden, slechte tijden Braceface
- Spouse: Tom Van Landuyt
- Children: 3

Angela Schijf is a Dutch-Belgian actress. Since 2007 she is mainly known for her role in the long running Dutch police drama series Flikken Maastricht.

== Career ==
Schijf gained national fame through her role as Kim Verduyn in the show Goede Tijden, Slechte Tijden, which she played from 1996 until 1999.

After taking on many roles in television and movies, Schijf began playing Eva van Dongen in the Dutch police drama TV-series Flikken Maastricht in 2007, which finished production on its nineteenth season in 2024.

Between 2014 and 2016 Schijf performed the play Kreutzersonate, als het verlangen maar stopt, inspired by Leo Tolstoy's novella The Kreutzer Sonata, in theatres around the Netherlands and Belgium with her husband and two musicians. In 2016 the play was banned from being performed by court order after two Belgian musicians who had been replaced by Dutch musicians objected to their copyright being used. Schijf appealed the judgment.

== Personal life ==
On 3 July 2002 she married the Belgian actor Tom Van Landuyt. Together they have three daughters.

After living in Antwerp for 11 years, Schrijf obtained a Belgian passport in 2013, saying she feels she is as much Dutch as she is Belgian.

== Filmografie ==
=== Television ===
- 1993–1995 - Oppassen!!! - Dorine
- 1996–1999 - Goede tijden, slechte tijden - Kim Verduyn
- 1996- M'n dochter en ik - Emma Timmers
- 1996 - Ik ben je moeder niet - Denise
- 1998 - 12 steden, 13 ongelukken - Dorith
- 1999–2000 - Babes - Suzanne
- 1999 - Baantjer - Marieke van Dijk
- 2001 - Dok 12 - Julia
- 2001 - Costa! - Fabiënne
- 2001-2005 - Braceface - Sharon Spitz (voice) + Singer (Leader)
- 2002–2005 - Meiden van De Wit - Frédérique de Wit
- 2005–2006 - Lieve Lust - Nikki
- 2007 - Total Drama Island - Bridgette (voice)
- 2007–now - Flikken Maastricht - Eva van Dongen
- 2007 - Sinterklaasjournaal - Marloes
- 2006 - Aspe - Sylvia Arnolds
- 2013 - Van God Los - Chantal
- 2017 - Meisje Van Plezier - Nadine

=== Movie ===
- 2000 - Nacht in de Stad - Danser
- 2000 - De Leeuw van Oz - Caroline
- 2001 - Ik ook van jou - Reza
- 2001 - Down - Tracy
- 2003 - Van God Los - Anna Sprengers
- 2003 - De ordening - Stella
- 2005 - De Griezelbus - Ursula
- 2006 - Bratz: Genie Magic - Cloe/Kirstee (voice)
- 2006 - Bratz: Forever Diamondz - Cloe (voice)
- 2010 - The Dinner Club - Babette Struyk
- 2011 - Mega Mindy en de Snoepbaron - Zaila
- 2012 - De Overloper - Eva van Dongen
- 2013 - Daglicht - Iris Boelens
- 2015 - Schone handen - Chantal
- 2017 - Storm
