= Guts (1999 film) =

1999 film

- Directed by: Ron Termaat
- Written by: Ron Termaat
- Release date: 1999
- Running time: 90 minutes
- Country: Netherlands
- Language: Dutch

Guts (Dutch title: Lef ) is a 1999 Dutch comedy film directed by Ron Termaat.

It won the Grolsch Prize at the 1999 Netherlands Film Festival.

== Cast ==
- Viggo Waas ... Olivier / Jules
- Alice Reys ... Marielle
- Rick Engelkes ... Luc
- Victor Reinier ... Ex-vriend / Clerence
- Berco van Rheeden ... Bob
- Michiel Varga ... Regisseur
- Isolde Hallensleben ... Regie-assistante
- Eric van Sauers ... Aanplakker
- Ineke Veenhoven ... Tante Liesbeth
- Lia Bolte ... Productieleidster
- Bert Verboom ... Cameraman
- Fer van Duren ... Art-director
- Evert van der Meulen ... Autokoper
- Ron Termaat ... Ober
