= Ad Fundum =

1993 film directed by Erik Van Looy

- DVD cover
- Directed by: Erik Van Looy
- Written by: Mark Punt
- Produced by: Mark Punt
- Starring: Marilou Mermans; Jaak Van Assche; Sven De Ridder; Tom Van Landuyt
- Cinematography: Willy Stassen
- Edited by: Philippe Ravoet; Ludo Troch
- Music by: Jean-Marie Aerts; Tom Wolf
- Release date: 1993
- Running time: 98 minutes
- Country: Belgium
- Language: Dutch

Ad Fundum is a 1993 Belgian drama film directed by Erik Van Looy. It is his first feature-length film after the short films Dr. Tritsmans and Yuppies. It tells the story of some students studying at the university of Leuven who participate in some initiation rites.

== Plot ==
Sammy, Dennis, and Tom are 18 years old and enrolled as students at the university in Leuven. They rent some rooms in a fraternity house. As first-year students they decide to join a student association and have a hazing. They become freshman and "sell" themselves to do some tasks. The shy Sammy is giving the task to bring a jar of his own semen to the initiation ceremony. As he rejects, he is set on a "flying carpet". Whilst Sammy is in the air, chairman Guy Bogaerts orders the students to withdraw the carpet. Sammy falls on the ground, breaks his vertebra and dies immediately.

The police starts an investigation: the students will not talk and the students' union claims Sammy died due to alcohol abuse. The university and the police agree to handle the situation with the necessary discretion. The dean do not want to listen to Tom his accusations and follows the conclusion of the police.

Dennis and Tom start their own investigation. They find a man who was fraternized some years earlier also under command of Guy Bogaerts. He was also set on the flying carpet which was suddenly removed. He broke his leg and walks with a limp since then. The case "Sammy" is set to court, but the judge opines there is not enough proof so Guy is set free.

Dennis and Tom want revenge and challenge Guy to steal the town's flag. Guy climbs the town hall and takes the flag. However, an unknown person opens the window. Guy falls down, hits the ground and is taken away by an ambulance but his fate is unknown. The police starts interrogating witnesses but they all remain silent.

== Title ==
"Ad Fundum" (Latin for "to the bottom") is a term used among students for drinking an entire glass of beer at one time.

== Dead Guy ==
Most viewers conclude Guy died due to his fall but this is not true unless it is a non-confirmed directorial error. According Belgian law there are a few exceptions in which a dead body can be transported by an ambulance. All of these require the body is fully covered by a sheet as soon as it is being taken away from the spot the person died or has been found. Sammy's body is covered, but not the body of Guy. This proofs Guy is not dead at the moment he is taken in the ambulance. In next shot the police interrogates witnesses followed by the end credits so the fate of Guy remains unknown.
