= Godforsaken =

- Film poster
- Directed by: Pieter Kuijpers
- Written by: Paul Jan Nelissen; Pieter Kuijpers
- Produced by: Hanneke Niens; Reinier Selen; Anton Smit
- Starring: Tygo Gernandt; Angela Schijf; Egbert Jan Weeber
- Cinematography: Bert Pot
- Edited by: Job ter Burg
- Music by: Het Paleis van Boem
- Production companies: IDTV Film; Rinkel Film Productions
- Distributed by: RCV Film Distribution
- Release date: 24 April 2003
- Running time: 83 minutes
- Country: Netherlands
- Languages: Dutch; Turkish

Godforsaken (Dutch: Van God Los) is a 2003 Dutch drama film directed by Pieter Kuijpers from a screenplay he co-wrote with Paul Jan Nelissen. It stars Tygo Gernandt, Angela Schijf, and Egbert Jan Weeber.

The film received a Golden Film (100,000 visitors), and won three Golden Calves.

== Plot ==
Stan Meijer is a teenage boy living in a small town in the southern Netherlands in the 1990s. Unhappy at home and distant from his mother and stepfather, he becomes friends with local criminal Mike Verheije. Mike is secretly dating Anna, whose parents disapprove of him, and Stan helps the couple meet. Through Mike, his younger brother Yuri, and their drug-using friend Sef, Stan becomes involved in petty crime and the illegal trade in equipment used for growing cannabis. During this period, Stan also finds his biological father, Bert Mulder, and asks to live with him, but Bert dies in a road accident before they can develop their relationship. After Mike is released from jail, Sef tells him that cannabis grower Johan Schreurs keeps a large amount of cash at his home. Mike and Stan attempt to rob Schreurs, but the robbery goes wrong and Schreurs is killed.

The killing brings Mike and Stan into contact with Osman Sukur, a powerful local criminal who had employed Schreurs. After questioning them about the murder, Osman begins using the group for violent jobs, including the killing of a man named Hassan. Mike, Stan, Yuri, and Sef become increasingly involved in Osman's criminal activities. Meanwhile, Anna moves in with Mike and becomes pregnant, but their relationship deteriorates as Mike becomes more involved in violence. After Anna talks about Schreurs's death and is questioned by police, Osman begins to doubt the group's loyalty. Anna later loses her pregnancy and returns to her parents. Mike convinces her to return, but his conflict with Osman grows after Osman accuses Stan of cooperating with police. Mike confronts Osman and later becomes a target of his organization. Stan and Anna then discuss leaving together, and Stan secretly gathers money to help her escape.

Mike eventually returns to Sef, who again claims that a large amount of money is hidden in the home of an elderly couple. Mike, Stan, and Sef rob the house, but the promised money cannot initially be found. During the robbery, Sef reveals that Stan has been saving money for Anna and tells Mike that Stan and Anna planned to leave together. Mike confronts Stan over the apparent betrayal and later confronts Anna as the group turns against one another. The violence ends with the group broken apart and Stan surviving the events. Looking back, Stan says that he has learned that the people he loves eventually disappear from his life and concludes that keeping others at a distance prevents them from hurting him again.

== Cast ==
- Tygo Gernandt as Maikel Verheije
- Angela Schijf as Anna Sprengers
- Egbert Jan Weeber as Stan Meijer
  - Diego Teixeira as Stan, 11 years old
- Huub Stapel as Herbert Meijer
- Johnny Lion as Johan Schreurs
- Pim Lambeau as Mrs. Van de Velde
- Frits Lambrechts as Mr. Van de Velde
- Mads Wittermans as Sef
- Selma Avkapan as granddaughter of Osman
- Tamar Avkapan as Nadir
- Marnie Blok as Arnie
- Mark Kleuskens as Cop

== Background ==
The movie is based on the real life of the “Gang from Venlo”, that left a trail of death and destruction in the North-Middle Limburg area from 1993 till 1994. The most notorious incident is known as the “Carnival Murders”. During the 'farmer's wedding', an event at the carnival of 1994, the old couple Sjeng and Ferda van Rijn were murdered in a robbery.

In the movie names were changed out of respect for the people involved. There are also differences in the run-up to the incidents in the film. The incidents themselves however occurred in real life.

Many of the members of the Gang from Venlo are still unknown. It is also unclear who committed which crime. In 1997 18 men were convicted and received varied sentences from 10 years to life in prison. Seven murders, committed in cold blood, could be proven in court. The exact number of murders committed by the Gang from Venlo is uncertain. It is certain that three bodies that were found belonged to victims of the Gang from Venlo. The other four bodies were never found, and thus there are still doubts as to whether these four other murders actually happened.
