= The Night of the Wild Donkeys =

De Nacht van de Wilde Ezels
- Directed by: Pim de la Parra
- Written by: Paul Ruven, Pim de la Parra
- Release date: 1990
- Running time: 102 minutes
- Country: Netherlands
- Language: Dutch

The Night of the Wild Donkeys or De Nacht van de Wilde Ezels is a 1990 Dutch film directed by Pim de la Parra.

== Cast ==
- Pim de la Parra ... Waldo van Romondt
- Liz Snoyink ... Joanna van Romondt
- Camilla Braaksma ... Carmen Helman
- Kenneth Herdigein ... Patrick Delprado
- Hans Dagelet ... Jack de Boer
- Manouk van der Meulen ... Mathilde Vanessen
- Jake Kruyer ... John Bob
- Marian Mudder ... Marouska (as Marian Morée)
- Gert-Jan Louwe ... Laurens Lang
- Isabella Van Rooy ... Lovanna
- Martijn Apituley ... Vincent de Leeuw
- Marie Kooyman ... Helen de Boer
- Carel Donck ... Jan Slokker
- Bonnie Williams ... Maureen Schwarzenegger
- Harriët Beudeker ... Lid van meisjesbende
