= Marian Mudder =

Dutch actor and writer

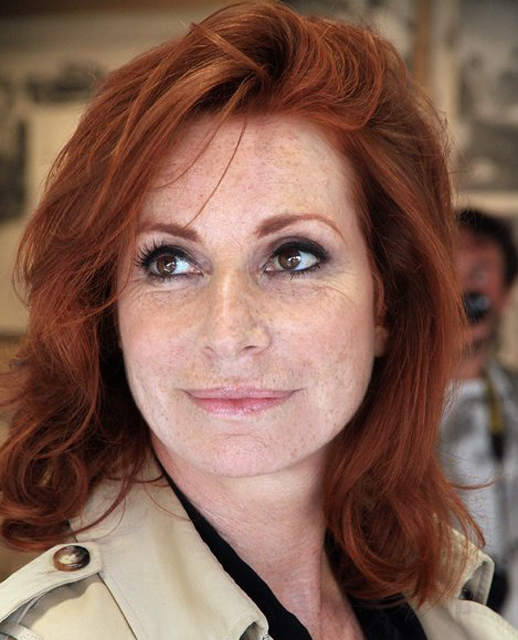
- Born: 8 January 1958 (age 68); Rotterdam, Netherlands
- Education: The Royal Conservatoire Antwerp
- Occupations: Actor, author
- Years active: 1989–present
- Known for: Baantjer, Vrouwenvleugel, Geluksblind
- Website: Marianmudder.nl

Marian Mudder (born 8 January 1958 in Rotterdam, Netherlands) is a Dutch actor and author.

== Education ==
Mudder studied psychology for a year before switching to theatre school at the RCA.

== Career ==
=== As actor ===
In 1989, Mudder debuted as actress in the theatre play De Lente. After this she would play in various other theatre productions before also appearing in film and TV.

She became known to the general public for her roles as Nathalie Tellegen in the TV drama Vrouwenvleugel and as Vera Prins in the crime series Baantjer. She would also have roles in series like Westenwind, Goede tijden, slechte tijden, Flikken Maastricht, Voetbalvrouwen and Smeris.

In 1990, Mudder would play in her first movie The Night of the Wild Donkeys. She would play in several more movies, most notable of which Loenatik - De moevie.

=== As author ===
In 2009, Mudder would release her first book. This was the novel Geluksblind. She would later also release De perfecte minnares (2011), Volgende keer bij ons (2012) and Opium (2015).

In 2013, Mudder would release her first non-fiction book called Food Detectives. This was followed in 2017 with the semi-autobiographical Sofasessies.

Mudder also has a monthly column in the magazine Zin. In this column, Mudder discusses DVDs.
