= Baantjer =

Dutch TV series

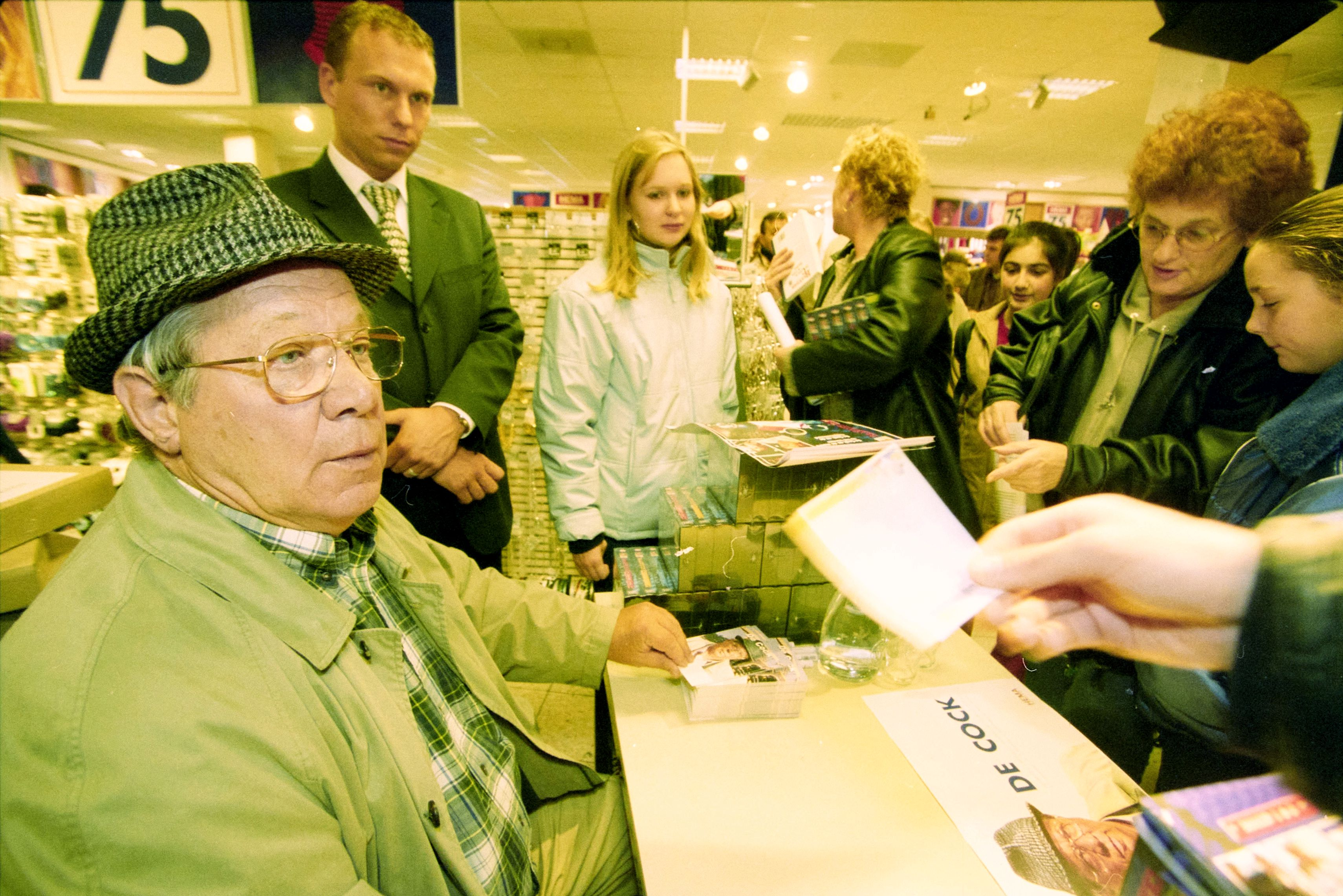
- Piet Römer as Jurre de Cock, 2001
- Genre: Crime drama
- Based on: Jurre de Cock series by A. C. Baantjer
- Starring: Piet Römer; Victor Reinier; Martin Schwab; Marian Mudder; Kirsten van Dissel; Serge-Henri Valcke; Hans Karsenbarg
- Country of origin: The Netherlands
- Original language: Dutch
- No. of seasons: 12
- No. of episodes: 123

Production
- Production company: John de Mol Produkties

Original release
- Network: RTL 4
- Release: 6 October 1995 – 1 December 2006

Related
- Amsterdam Vice

Baantjer is a Dutch television programme which was broadcast by RTL 4 from 6 October 1995 until 1 December 2006 for a total of 123 episodes in 12 seasons. It stars Piet Römer as Jurriaan 'Jurre' de Cock, a police detective, and Victor Reinier as Dick Vledder, his helper. The series is based on the novels of writer A. C. Baantjer.

In 1999, RTL 4 broadcast the television film Baantjer, de film: De Cock en de wraak zonder einde because of the tenth anniversary of the network.

In 2019, the series was revived for a thirteenth season and a film, starring Waldemar Torenstra, aired on RTL 4 and Videoland. The film Amsterdam Vice (Baantjer: Het Begin) won the Golden Film award two weeks after its premiere on 18 April 2019.

== Cast ==
Main
Guest
Recurring
Not in series

Actor	Personage	Season											
Actor	Personage	1	2	3	4	5	6	7	8	9	10	11	12
Piet Römer	Jurre de Cock	Main	Main	Main	Main	Main	Main	Main	Main	Main	Main	Main	Main
Victor Reinier	Dick Vledder	Main	Main	Main	Main	Main	Main	Main	Main	Main	Main	Main	Main
Martin Schwab	Ab Keizer	Main	Main	Main	Main	Main	Main	Main	Main	Main	Main	Main	Main
Marian Mudder	Vera Prins	Main	Main	Main	Main	Main	Main	Main	Main				2
Kirsten van Dissel	Iris de Graaff									9	Main	Main	Main
Wimie Wilhelm	Els Peeters						62 episodes						
Serge-Henri Valcke	Corneel Buitendam	Main	Main	Main	Main	Main	Main	Main	Main	Main	Main	Main	Main
Hans Karsenbarg	Ennaeus den Koninghe	Main	Main	Main	Main	Main	Main	Main	Main	Main	Main	Main	Main
Nienke Sikkema	Mevrouw de Cock	123 episodes											
Freek van Muiswinkel	Thijs Jochems	51 episodes											
Jaap Stobbe, Herman Kortekaas, Ab Abspoel, John Leddy, Piet Kamerman	Lowietje	Main	Main	Main	Main	Main	Main	Main	Main	Main	Main	Main	Main
