= Piet Römer =

Dutch actor

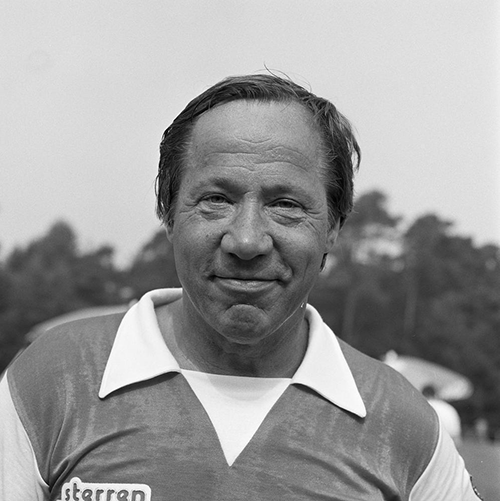
- Piet Römer in 1981
- Born: Petrus Römer; 2 April 1928; Amsterdam, Netherlands
- Died: 17 January 2012 (aged 83); Amsterdam, Netherlands
- Occupation: Actor
- Years active: 1952–2011
- Notable work: Baantjer
- Spouse: Penien Römer–Siebers (1946–2012; his death)
- Children: 5

Petrus "Piet" Römer (2 April 1928 – 17 January 2012) was a Dutch television, film and stage actor.

== Background ==
He was also a recording artist and had numerous releases from the early 1960s to the mid 1970s.

== Filmography ==
=== Television series ===
- Stiefbeen en Zoon (1963–1964) – Dirk Stiefbeen / Zoon stiefbeen
- 't Schaep Met De 5 Pooten (1969–1970) – Kootje de Beer / Zichzelf
- Merijntje Gijzen (1973) – Flierefluiter
- Baantjer (1995–2006) – de Cock

=== Feature films ===
- De zaak M.P. (1960) – Douanier
- The Silent Raid (1962) – Eppie Bultsma
- Like Two Drops of Water (1963)
- Amsterdam Affair (1968) – Detective
- Business Is Business (1971) – Piet
- Een huis in een schoen (1971) – Senor Piet
- VD (1972) – Secretaris
- Het Jaar van de Kreeft (1975) – Daan
- Heb medelij, Jet! (1975) – Bodde
- Peter en de vliegende autobus (1976) – Buschauffeur
- De bende van Hiernaast (1980) – Piet
- All Things Pass (1981) – Gerben
- The Elevator (1983) – Beheerder
- Mevrouw Ten Kate en het beest in de mens (1991)
- Baantjer, de film: De Cock en de wraak zonder einde (1999) - Det. Juriaan 'Jurre' de Cock
