= Appie Baantjer =

Dutch author and police officer (1923–2010)

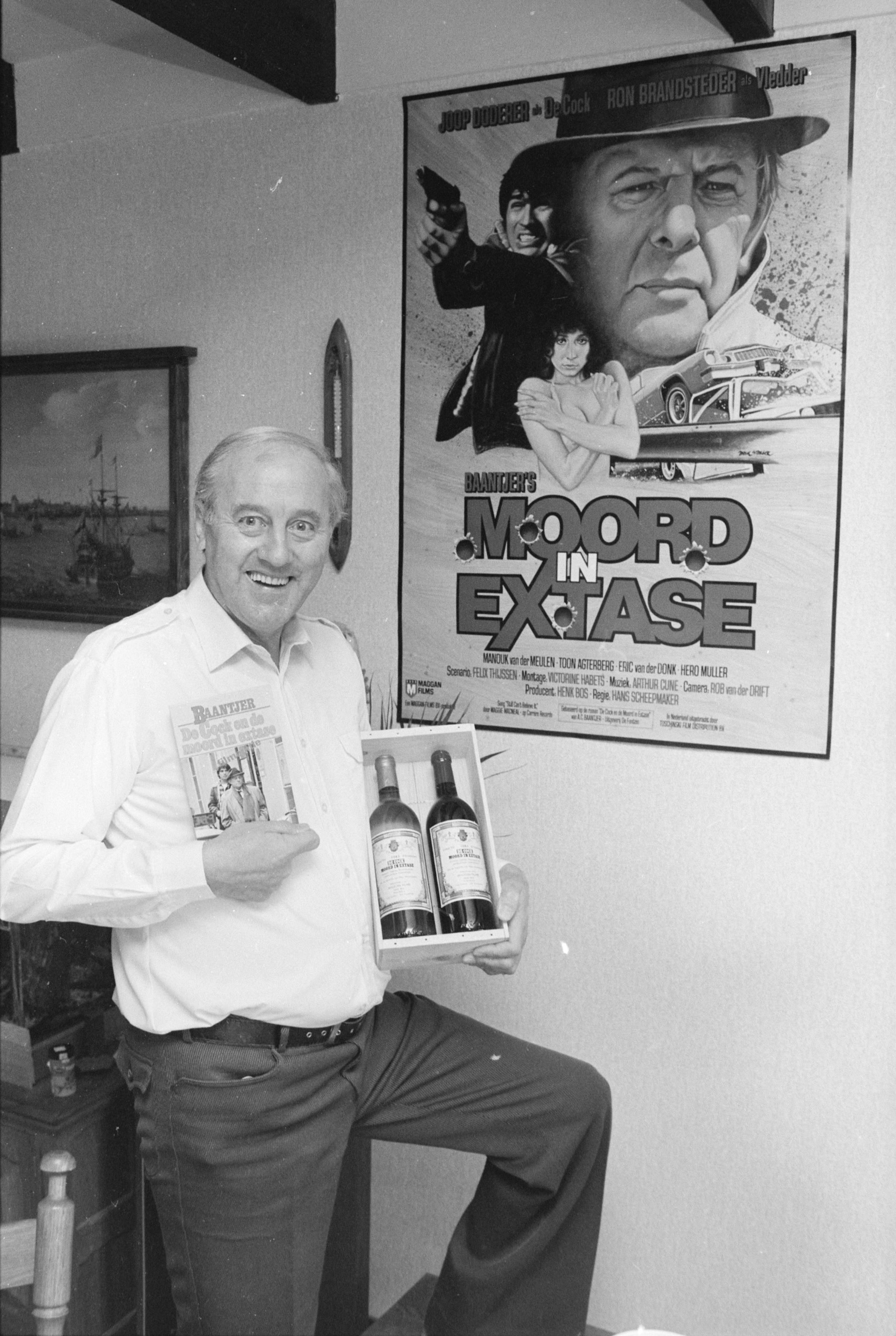
- Baantjer in 1984
- Born: Albert Cornelis Baantjer; 16 September 1923; Urk, Netherlands
- Died: 29 August 2010 (aged 86); Alkmaar, Netherlands
- Occupations: Author; Police officer
- Years active: 1959–2010
- Notable work: Baantjer
- Spouse: Marretje van der Vaart (m. 1952; died 2007)

Albert Cornelis "Appie" Baantjer (16 September 1923 – 29 August 2010) was a Dutch author of detective fiction and police officer.

Baantjer is mostly known for his commercially successful detective series surrounding police inspector De Cock and his assistant, sergeant Vledder. In the late 1990s and early 2000s, the series was adapted to television as Baantjer and won the 1997 Gouden Televizier-ring, the most important Dutch television prize.

== Early life ==
Baantjer was born in 1923 on the Dutch island of Urk as one of the three children of Aaltje Bos (1905–1996) and Albert Baantjer (1901–1965). Baantjer's paternal family is from Sliedrecht and Urk, while his maternal family had settled on the island as early as the seventeenth century. He is direct descendant of Pieter Lubbertsz Cremer, one of the first-known mayors of the town.

Baantjer initially worked as an oil seller at the age of sixteen, but moved to Amsterdam in 1945 to work for the police. He became a detective at the police office at the Warmoesstraat. One of his most noteworthy cases in the 1950s was the Moord op Magere Josje, for which he was lead detective and which received wide media attention.

== Career ==
In 1959, Baantjer, now working as a detective, and his head inspector Maurice van Dijk wrote a book titled 5x8... grijpt in. The novel received media attention from De Volkskrant and De Maasbode.

Baantjer is mainly known for his large series of detective novels revolving around police inspector De Cock (also translated as DeKok) and his side-kick, sergeant Vledder. The name of the protagonist simply means "cook" in Dutch, but has an unusual spelling which is at the heart of a running gag that involves De Cock spelling out his name every time he introduces himself to someone.

The novels have spin-offs in the form of a motion picture and a long-running TV-series entitled Baantjer. Both are named after the author, rather than the main character(s). This led to screenwriter Berend Boudewijn's bitter statement in a Dutch TV guide (VPRO Gids, 11 November 2005) that "Baantjer is the only TV series in the world that is named after a writer, even though it is not written by him." (This is not entirely true: The Belgian TV series Aspe is also named after its writer, Pieter Aspe, who wrote the first season but not the second.)

Baantjer's novels have made their way into the English language through the publishing house Speck Press. De Cock's name has been translated as DeKok. There are approximately 23 of the 60 published Baantjer titles available in English. His books have also been translated into Spanish, French, Russian, Korean, Estonian and Esperanto.
