= Victor Reinier =

Dutch actor and screenwriter

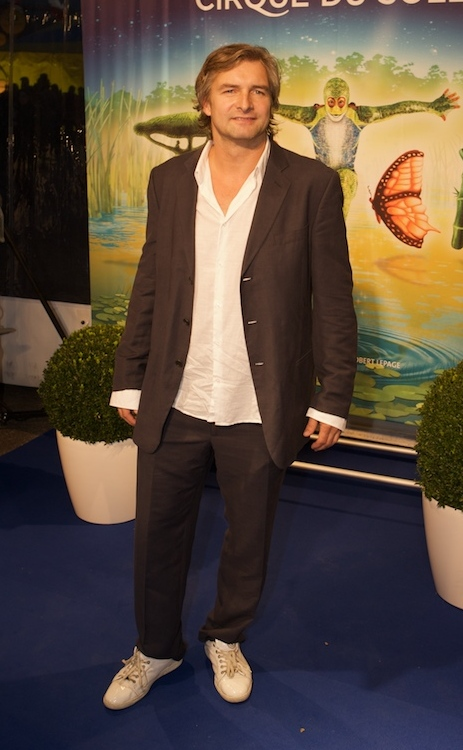
- Born: Victor Reinier Nieuwenhuijzen; Amsterdam, Netherlands
- Occupations: Actor, screenwriter
- Years active: 1989–present
- Father: Kees Nieuwenhuijzen
- Relatives: Annet Nieuwenhuyzen (cousin)

Victor Reinier Nieuwenhuijzen is a Dutch actor and screenwriter.

== Filmography ==
=== Actor ===
==== Films ====
- 2014 – KrisKras – tourist
- 2012 – De Overloper – Floris Wolfs
- 2011 – Caged – Mike
- 2011 – Nova Zembla – Jacob van Heemskerck
- 2008 – De brief voor de Koning – Ristridin
- 2003 – The Horseless Prince – father
- 1999 – Baantjer: De Cock en de wraak zonder einde – Dick Vledder
- 1999 – Guts – Clerence
- 1996 – Weg – Vincent
- 1992 – Rerun – Felix
- 1990 – Alissa in Concert – agent
- 1990 – My Blue Heaven – Mickey

==== Television ====
- 2007–2025 – Flikken Maastricht – Floris Wolfs
- 2006 – Aspe – Freek Keyzer
- 2005–2007 – Gooische Vrouwen – Anton van Kampen
- 2004 – De Band – Sjoert
- 2001 – All Stars – De serie – Quizmaster
- 1997 – Pittige tijden – Fledder
- 1995–2006 – Baantjer – Dick Vledder
- 1994 – Flodder – Vince Schaeffers
- 1993 – Bureau Kruislaan – police officer
- 1993, 1995 – Coverstory – Arno
- 1992 – Oppassen!!! – Jacques de Smet
- 1990, 1993 – 12 steden, 13 ongelukken – Harjo
- 1990–1991 – Spijkerhoek – Bas de Vries

=== Presenter ===
AVROTROS

- 2014–present – De Duitsers

TROS

- 2011 – De beste zangers van Nederland
- 2010 – De beste zangers van Nederland
- 2010 – Timboektoe

SBS6

- 2003–2004 – De Sponsor Loterij Trap
- 2003 – Klaar voor de Start

RTL 5

- 2003 – Victor op Zoek

RTL 4

- 2002 – Typisch '70
- 1997–2001 – Lucky Letters

=== Screenwriter ===
- 2007–present – Flikken Maastricht

=== Director ===
- 2012–2013 – Flikken Maastricht
