= Flikken Maastricht =

Dutch television series

- Genre: Police drama
- Created by: Reinout Oerlemans
- Developed by: Rolf Koot; Reinout Oerlemans; Erwin Provoost; Hans de Weers
- Written by: Kees Vroege; Pierre De Clerq; Simone Kome-van Breugel; Henk Apotheker; Jan Harm Dekker
- Starring: Angela Schijf; Victor Reinier; Oda Spelbos; Sergio IJssel; Helmert Woudenberg; Will van Kralingen; Jamie Grant; Ria Eimers
- Composer: Fons Merkies
- Country of origin: Netherlands
- Original language: Dutch
- No. of seasons: 19
- No. of episodes: 203 (list of episodes)

Production
- Production locations: Maastricht, Amsterdam, Liège
- Running time: 50 min. (official); 45 min. (effective)

Original release
- Network: Nederland 1 (TROS) (2007-2014); NPO 1 (AVROTROS) (2014-present)
- Release: 3 September 2007

Related
- Flikken; Flikken Rotterdam

Flikken Maastricht (Belgian Dutch for "Maastricht Cops") is a Dutch police drama. The series is set in Maastricht, Limburg, a city in the south of the Netherlands, and began broadcasting on Dutch channel NPO 1 on 3 September 2007. The series is a spin-off of the Flemish show Flikken set in Ghent, Belgium.

== Premise ==
On 24 November 2006, it was published that Victor Reinier and Angela Schijf who formerly starred on long-running soap opera Goede tijden, slechte tijden would play a main role on the show. On the same day, the contracts with the city of Maastricht and the police of Limburg-Zuid were signed. On 18 March 2007, the complete cast was announced.

The first episode of the series aired on 3 September 2007 at 10:00pm by the Dutch broadcast organisation TROS on channel Nederland 1. 13 weeks later, on 26 November, the last episode of the first season was aired. The first season had an average of 1,314,000 viewers per episode, and on 20 March 2008 it was released on DVD.

Since 2 September 2008, the series has also aired in Belgium, on Channel 1. On average, 737,000 Belgian viewers watched the first season. The second season aired in Belgium in autumn 2010. The show is also aired in Italy, under the title Flikken - Coppia in Giallo, with Italian voice-overs. The first season was viewed by 1,100,000 on average in Italy.

In 2009, the third and fourth seasons were recorded. The third season started on 30 October 2009 and had 10 episodes. The fourth season was aired directly after the third season. The reason for this is unknown.

In the beginning of 2010, TROS announced that they had ordered to produce the fifth season. This season also had 10 episodes. The recordings started at the end of May 2010. The first episode aired on 7 January 2011. In the fifth season, Will van Kralingen (hoofdinspecteur Ellis Flammand) came back after she had to leave earlier for medical reasons.

The popularity of the show was proven at the 'Flikkendag Maastricht 2010' on 25 September 2010. That day included demos of emergency services in Maastricht with special visits of the four leading actors from the show. Previously there was a Flikkendag in Ghent.

In the series, the city of Maastricht and the police station of that city are often portrayed. Many of the stories play on or around the Sint Pieters Mountain. What lacks making the image of Limburg complete is the use of the Limburgian dialect. One of the main characters, Eva van Dongen, was born in Maastricht in the series. However, she speaks pure Dutch.

Every once in a while the shooting of the show in Maastricht and its surroundings proves be a slight nuisance. For example, the municipality of Roermond was not very glad when the tunnel on Rijksweg 73 was blocked.

The sixth season starting airing on 27 January 2012 with the TV film De Overloper, in which storylines from previous seasons were resolved. The following week, on 3 February, the first episode of season 6 aired, with Ria Eimers playing the role of the new hoofdinspecteur Frieda Mechels.

TROS ordered ten new episodes for the seventh season even before the sixth season started airing. The shooting started on 5 June 2012. The seventh season was scheduled to air on 22 February 2013. It was also announced that the character Esmee van Rooy (played by Jamie Grant) would return. It is clear that the series was to be continued: in fall 2012 preparations for the eighth season commenced.

=== Producers ===
The producers of the series are:

Name	No of episodes
Rolf Koot	94
Hans de Weers	41
Maarten Swart	31
Reinout Oerlemans	26
Erwin Provoost	7
Stephan Warnik	6

=== Direction ===
Up until now the show has been directed by:

Name	No of episodes
Martin Schwab	46
Pieter van Rijn	28
Vincent Schuurman	14
Victor Reinier	4
Pieter Walther Boer	3

== De Overloper ==
De Overloper is the TV film of Flikken Maastricht from 2012. This movie continues from the last episode of season 5 and contains important developments in the storyline.

== Cast ==
Cast	Character	Occupation	Seasons			First episode	Last episode	No. of episodes (credited)	Notes
Cast	Character	Occupation	Regular	Recurring	Guest	First episode	Last episode	No. of episodes (credited)	Notes
Victor Reinier	Floris Wolfs	Detective (Agent 5th Grade)	1–			"Een Valse noot" (1.01)		138	
Angela Schijf	Eva van Dongen	Detective (Agent 4th Grade)	1–			"Een Valse noot" (1.01)		138	
Oda Spelbos	Marion Dreesen	Police officer (5th Grade)	1–			"Een Valse noot" (1.01)		130	
Sergio IJssel	Romeo Sanders	Police officer (4th Grade)	1–			"Een Valse noot" (1.01)		138	
Will van Kralingen	Ellis Flamand	Chief Inspector	1, 5			"Een Valse noot" (1.01)	"Schuld" (5.10)	23	
Helmert Woudenberg	Eugène Hoeben	Chief Inspector	2–4			"Afgemaakt" (2.01)	"Hangen" (4.10)	30	
Thomas Acda	Daan de Vos	Police officer (4th Grade)	4–5	7	6	"Vuil spel" (4.04)	"Hawala" (7.08)	16	
Ria Eimers	Frieda Mechels	Chief Inspector	6–13			"Een nieuw begin" (6.01)	"Marion" (13.02)	74	
Jamie Grant	Esmee van Rooy	Police officer (3rd Grade)	7–9	5		"Begraven" (5.01)	"De trappen" (9.02)	28	
Vivienne van den Assem	Tonja Lacroix	Informer	7			"De spin" (7.03)	"Shock" (7.10)	6	
Antoinette Jelgersma	Marlies Kamphuis	Chief Inspector	13–15		11	"Ontsnapt" (11.02)	"Hoop sterft het laatst: Part 2" (15.11)	37	
Joy Wielkens	Donna Martina	Chief Inspector	16	15		"De fantast" (15.03)	"Resurrectie" (16.01)	10	
Irma Hartog	Thea Zitman	Chief Inspector	16–		15	"Gebrek aan bewijs" (15.07)		26	

Angela Schijf who plays the role of Eva van Dongen got the nickname "Schietschijf" on set, which is a Dutch pun on her name because she can shoot quite well.

Since the third season, Dutch actors have guest starred in Flikken Maastricht, including Piet Römer, Melody Klaver, Daniël Boissevain, Theo Maassen, Tygo Gernandt, Rick Engelkes, Mimoun Oaïssa and Melissa Drost.

Three people have played themselves on Flikken Maastricht: Gerd Leers, mayor of Maastricht at the time, popular singer Frans Bauer, and the famous violinist André Rieu.

Andrea Croonenberghs guest-starred in the last two episodes of the first season (episode 12 and 13) as Britt Michiels, who used to play a main role on the original Flikken. It wasn't very clear as to what happened to Britt after her departure out of Ghent, even though she told Wolfs that she had no relationship and presently worked in Antwerp.

Thomas Acda played an important supporting role in season 4 and the first episode of season 5. He later returned in season 6.

In the fifth season, a new supporting actor joined the cast: Jamie Grant. Grant is not in the opening credits, but her name is credited after the title of the episode is displayed. She was not part of the cast in the sixth season because her character likely was still in a coma. It was announced that she would return in the seventh season.

In the sixth season there were two more supporting actors: Lee M. Ross and Bill Zielinski. Will van Kralingen quit again after the fifth season with her role as Ellis Flamand following her earlier hiatus of season 2–4. In season 2-4 Helmert Woudenberg played Eugène Hoeben as the hoofdinspecteur. Her successor is Frieda Mechels, played by Ria Eimers.

In the 7th season Jamie Grant returned as officer Esmee van Rooy and TROS-presenter Vivienne van den Assem had a recurring role as informant/infiltrator Tonja. Also, Thomas Acda returned as ex-detective Daan de Vos.

== Episodes ==
Season	Timeslot	Episodes	Première		Final		Ratings (in mln.)
Season	Timeslot	Episodes	Date	Ratings première (in mln.)	Date	Ratings final (in mln.)	Ratings (in mln.)
1	Monday 21:05	13	3 September 2007	1,29	26 November 2007	1,39	1,31
2	Monday 21:05	10	1 September 2008	0,99	7 November 2008	1,33	1,20
3	Friday 20:30	10	30 October 2009	1,87	22 January 2010	1,42	1,43
4	Friday 20:30	10	29 January 2010	1,63	23 April 2010	1,70	1,60
5	Friday 20:30	10	7 January 2011	1,89	11 March 2011	2,20	1,82
6	Friday 20:30	10	3 February 2012	1,73	6 April 2012	1,93	1,70
7	Friday 20:30	10	22 February 2013	2,03	26 April 2013	1,68	1,95
8	Friday 20:30	10	14 March 2014	2,35	16 May 2014	2,14	2,14
9	Friday 20:30	11	5 September 2014	2,13	14 November 2014	2,13	2,22
10	Friday 20:30	11	28 August 2015	2,00	6 November 2015	1,76	2,06
11	Friday 20:30	10	16 December 2016	1,71	17 February 2017	1,99	2,30
12	Friday 20:30	10	2 March 2018	1,64	27 April 2018	1,42	1,79
13	Friday 20:30	13	7 December 2018	1,36	1 March 2019	1,37	1,74
14	Friday 20:30	13	3 January 2020	1,33	27 March 2020	1,70	1,40
