= Antoine Bonfanti =

French sound engineer (1923–2006)

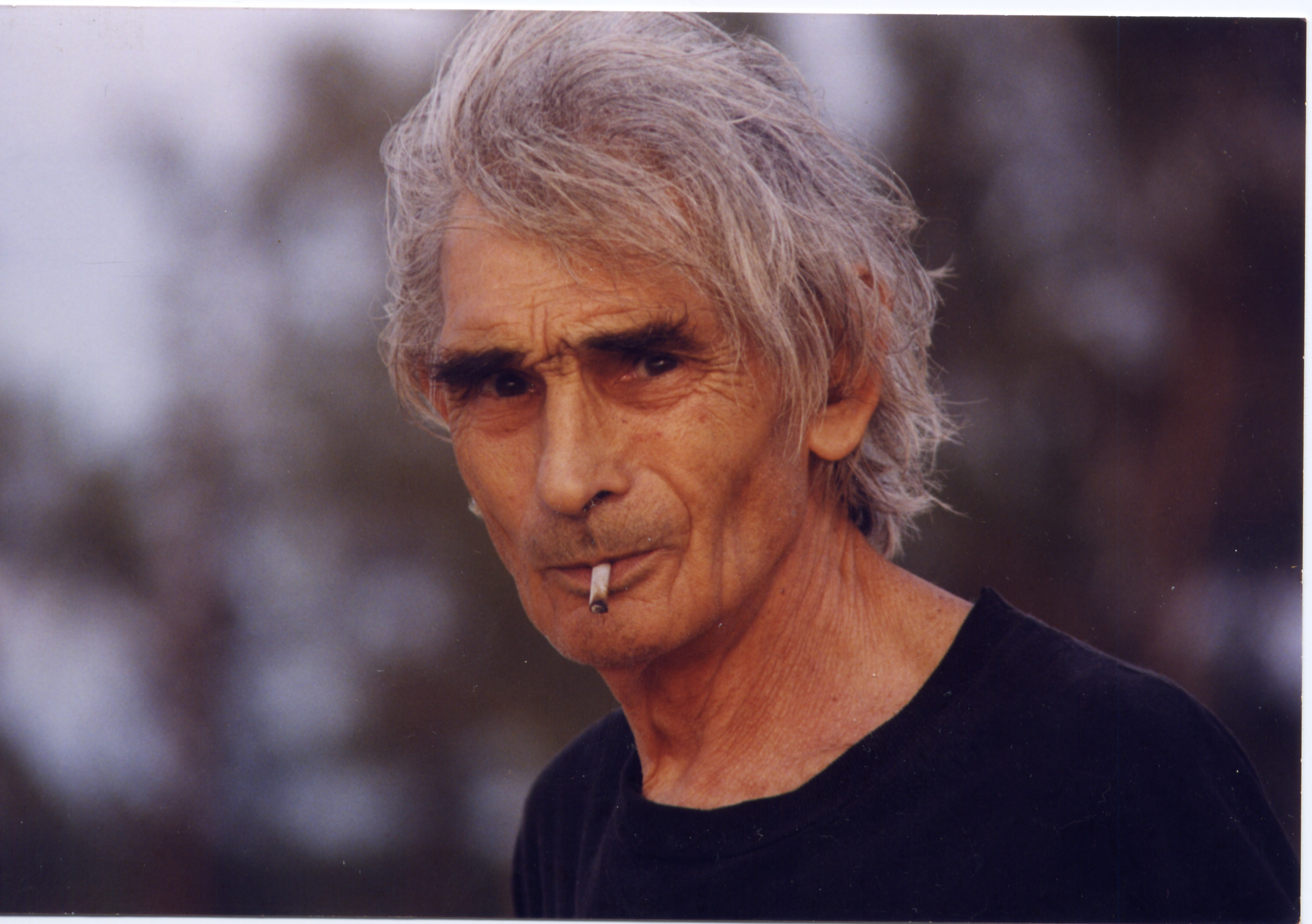
- Bonfanti in 1994

Background information
- Born: 26 October 1923; Ajaccio, Corsica
- Died: 4 March 2006 (aged 82)
- Occupation: Sound engineer

Antoine Bonfanti (23 October 1923 – 4 March 2006) was a French sound engineer and a professor at cinema schools and institutes in France and other countries. He taught at INSAS in Brussels and EICTV in Cuba.

== Early life ==
He was born 26 October 1923 in Ajaccio, Corsica, and died 4 March 2006 in Montpellier, France.

== Career ==
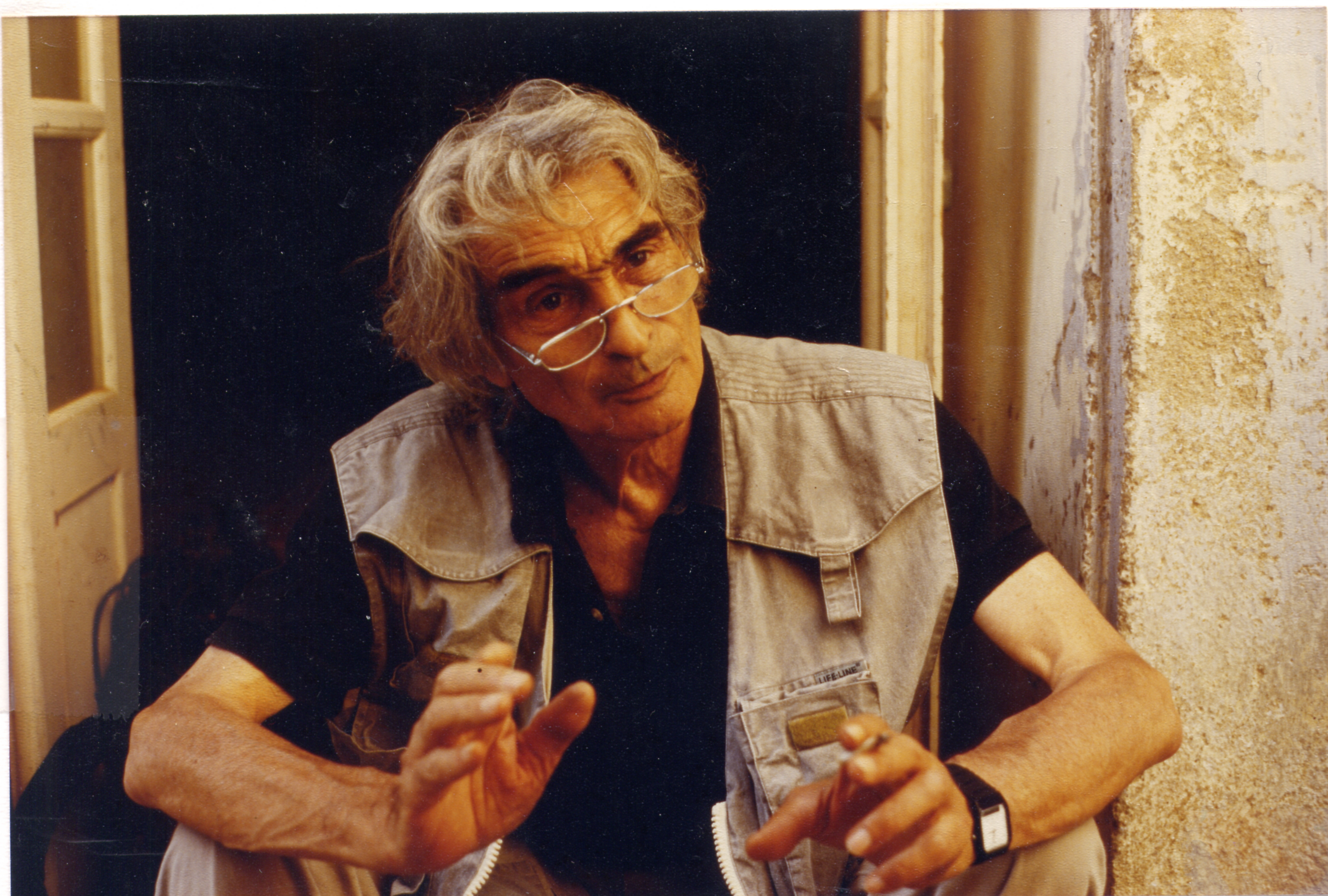
Antoine Bonfanti, "Always say, tell, convince..."

He began learning his profession as a trainee boom-operator on the film La Belle et la Bête by Jean Cocteau. He is considered one of the pioneers of direct-sound in film-making on location: "the school of direct-sound is French—said sound-engineer Jean-Pierre Ruh—it began with Antoine Bonfanti".

He is known for his collaborations with directors as Bernardo Bertolucci, André Delvaux, Amos Gitaï, Jean Luc Godard, Joris Ivens, William Klein, Chris Marker, Gérard Oury, Alain Resnais, René Vautier, and Paul Vecchiali (see filmography below).

Bonfanti's primary occupation is the authenticity of sound: above all he likes building the whole universe of sound of one film, through every stage from filming to sound-mixing. In this pattern, he had 120 films of which 80 feature films. His filmography includes about 420 titles of long and short Films of fiction or documentary; and within this number, some can be still missing because–as involved in cinema as in politics—Antoine did lots of "for free" that may have not been listed.

Member of the Résistance and volunteer soldier in the years of 1943-1945, militant, communist by spirit, and vigilante, he was a part of SLON collective—which later became ISKRA - and of the Medvedkine-groups.

He shared his sound-artist's talent and he has trained several generations of sound-engineers in many countries (Algeria, Angola, Argentina, Chile, Cuba, Morocco, Mozambique, Peru, Portugal, Tunisia, Venezuela), where cinema is a form of resistance.

The film Antoine Bonfanti—Traces sonores d'une écoute engagée, directed by Suzanne Durand, traces more than 50 years of Bonfanti's professional career, highlighting his collaborations with numerous filmmakers and his approach to sound practice beyond its technical aspects.

Bonfanti himself recounts this in an interview by Noël Simsolo on France-Culture, called "Mémoire du siècle, Antoine Bonfanti" on 20 August 1997, broadcast during "Les Nuits de France-Culture" at midnight of 25 January 2016.

== Biography ==
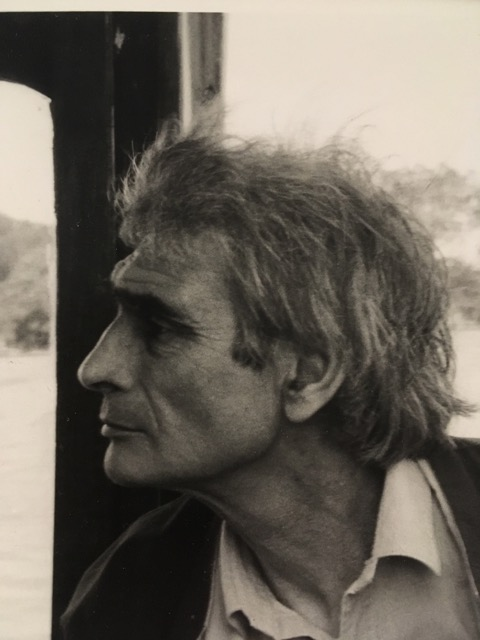
Antoine Bonfanti, Albania, 1988

Antoine, nicknamed "Nono" by his Corsican family, "Toni" by his war comrades, "Bonbon" within the world of cinema, was born in Ajaccio in 1923. The family leaves again for Africa in 1926, having already spent some years in Conakry in "République de Guinée", (formerly "Guinée française"). His father is "receveur principal des postes" in Bobo-Dioulasso in Burkina-Faso (formerly "Haute-Volta"). Antoine spends some of his youth there but, when his eldest brother must go to high-school, the family returns to Corsica, before his father be appointed "percepteur" (tax-collector) at Saint-Rambert d'Alban, and after at Touquet-Paris-Plage.

As a child, he discovers the paroquial-cine in Corsica. At Touquet, the family goes to the cinema pretty often. He remembers fondly the showing of the film "Les marins de Kronstadt" d'Efim Dzigan, organised by his father to mark the death of Roger Salengro in 1936, where spectators leave the theater singing "l'Internationale". He is 13 during the "Front populaire". At Boulogne-sur-Mer in the boarding-school at the "Collège Mariette" - and on his train journeys - he uses to pass near the steelworks, red flags hanging from the rooftops; and he remains very touched by the workers who were raising their fists to salute the train. The "pros and con" fight in the school-yard. There, Antoine "has been lucky enough to have Jean Marcenac as his teacher of Philosophy and French, who opened up the eyes and his library".

His political awareness began in June 1940, after the "drôle de guerre". He didn't understand Paul Reynaud's phrase who said after the debacle: "I don't believe in miracles, but if someone were to tell me that a single miracle could save France, I'd believe in that miracle". But two days later the Germans were occupying Touquet.

Later, boarding at College in Orléans (his "correspondent" is a Corsican chief of police), he was expelled in November 1941 for knocking out the chief-supervisor who deprives him of his meal; Antoine was a lightweight boxer and competitive swimmer.

He feels the pull of the resistance. He produces pamphlets on linoleum "in private", and tries on several times to reach England by small boats with friends. He is becoming dangerous for his father who is part of one resistance-movement; and when Antoine is called up, in May 1942, for the construction of the "Mur de l'Atlantique", his father orders him to escape to Corsica (it's his formerly correspondent who obtains a pass for him). He then forms part of the " Résistance armée urbaine" at the "Front National" (at this time: Front national pour la libération et l'indépendance de la France): "we were in a war of liberation against the Germans, and also in a war of revolution against the Petain-regime". In 1943, he commit himself as voluntary-soldier in the "Bataillon de choc". He becomes "chasseur" in the fourth company. After the Toulon-loading, his batallon goes up as far as Tyrol; Antoine loses numerous comrades on the way. To his great detriment, he is only demobilized in September 1945.

He has two children from a first marriage, Jean-Claude and Francis. Years later, he married Maryvon Le Brishoual whom he met in Brazil in 1968, during the filming of "Le grabuge" (O tumulto) by Edouard Luntz, produced by Fox. They have three children: Kalanna, Solène and Maël.

In 1946, he took correspondence lessons from the "Conservatoire des Arts et Métiers"; and thanks to his cousin, Mathieu Bonfanti, he was chosen as boomer-trainee on " La belle et la bête" by Jean Cocteau, at the "Studios de St Maurice" where, in the following time, he learns all the roles, all the trades of sound. In 1948, he started to work at " Radiodiffusion française" (which become RTF en 1949 and ORTF in 1964) where he learns " à faire ce qu'il ne faut pas faire" (what not to do). Ardent militant, he fights against the American politics which refuses to accept quotas; but with the "Accords Blum-Byrnes", Léon Blum sacrifices French cinema, in order "to put France back on the right track" with the Plan Marshall accepted, and announced in June 1947.

In 1962, he began teaching several times a year at l'INSAS in Brussels.

He took a keen interest by Cuba in 1963 during the filming of the documentary of Claude Otzenberger "Fidel si, Fidel no" ("Cuba 63"). He donated then to the ICAIC his favorite appliances (Nagra III and his fetish micro Beyerdynamic M 160). For him "Cuba is the discovery of a single application of a socialist concept, but the Cubans, remarkable people, don't deserve what they were to endure afterwards". He is rebelling constantly against l'embargo (called blocus in Cuba) that U.S.A. established in 1962, and still applied.

In 1989, he began teaching at EICTV each year until February 1999.

Antoine Bonfanti and directors, René Vautier, Yann Le Masson, Bruno Muel, and Jacqueline Meppiel, were very close, but he wasn't one to exclude anyone due to political differences, the only thing important to him was that he could "make his sound to become the sound of the film". When he has that freedom, the actors of his films are more likely to improvise and can't be dubbed in post-production (as Louis de Funès in the films of Gérard Oury).

He is invited to talks, seminars and conferences on sound, is a jury member or president at film festivals, but he is mostly solicited to institutes, centers and cinema schools in numerous countries; the Cinemathèque of Lisbonne devoted a week to him in 1985.

== Filmography ==
Filmography of his different sound collaborations and at different novels according to the years; (the dates of the films - Long or Short, fiction or documentary - are those of filming or release).

- 1945-48 : Studios de Saint-Maurice
- 1946 : La Belle et la Bête de Jean Cocteau
- 1948-50 : la Radiodiffusion française
- 1950-56 : Auditorium MGM-France
- 1955 : Afrique-sur-Seine de Paulin Soumanou Vieyra
- 1956 : Un général revient de René Vautier
- 1956-61 : Auditorium "la SIMO" (Direction Jean Neny), Studios de Boulogne
- 1956 : Les Aventures de Till L'Espiègle de Joris Ivens/Gérard Philippe
- 1957 : Les Marines de François Reichenbach
- 1958 : Hiroshima mon amour d'Alain Resnais
- 1959 : Os Bandeirantes de Marcel Camus
- 1960 : Les honneurs de la guerre de Jean Devewer
- 1960 : Magritte ou la leçon de choses de Luc de Heusch
- 1961 : L'oiseau de paradis de Marcel Camus
- 1962 : La Jetée de Chris Marker
- 1962 : Le Joli mai de Chris Marker
- 1962 : Muriel, ou le temps d'un retour d'Alain Resnais
- 1962 : Marvejols de Mario Ruspoli
- 1962 : Octobre à Paris de Jacques Panijel
- 1963 : Neuf émissions sur le cinéma polonais d'André Delvaux
- 1963 : Fidel si Fidel no (Cuba 63) de Claude Otzenberger
- 1963 : Les plus belles escroqueries du monde de Jean-Luc Godard
- 1963 : À Valparaíso de Joris Ivens
- 1963 : Les Félins de René Clément
- 1964 : L'insoumis d'Alain Cavalier
- 1964 : Une femme mariée de Jean-Luc Godard
- 1964 : Le Corniaud de Gérard Oury
- 1964 : L'homme au crâne rasé d'André Delvaux
- 1964 : Le coup de grâce de Jean Cayrol/Claude Durand
- 1964 : Bande à part de Jean-Luc Godard
- 1964 : Le train de John Frankenheimer
- 1965 : Le Bonheur 1^{re} part. d'Agnès Varda
- 1965 : Up to His Ears de Philippe de Broca
- 1965 : Qui êtes-vous Polly Maggoo ? de William Klein
- 1965 : The War Is Over d'Alain Resnais
- 1965 : Pierrot le fou de Jean-Luc Godard
- 1965 : Two or Three Things I Know About Her de Jean-Luc Godard
- 1965 : Masculin Féminin de Jean-Luc Godard
- 1965 : La brûlure des mille soleils de Pierre Kast
- 1965 : Nick Carter et le trèfle rouge de Jean-Paul Savignac
- 1965 : Suzanne Simonin, la Religieuse de Diderot de Jacques Rivette
- 1965 : Les Ruses du diable de Paul Vecchiali
- 1965 : Les Cœurs verts d'Edouard Luntz
- 1966 : La Loi du survivant de José Giovanni
- 1966 : La Grande Vadrouille de Gérard Oury
- 1966 : Jeu de massacre d'Alain Jessua
- 1966 : Le Père Noël a les yeux bleus de Jean Eustache
- 1966 : Le Peuple et ses fusils de Joris Ivens
- 1966 : La terre et la boue de Joris Ivens
- 1966 : Si j'avais 4 dromadaires de Chris Marker
- 1967 : Les jeunes loups de Marcel Carné
- 1967 : Un soir, un train d'André Delvaux
- 1967 : Je t'aime, je t'aime d'Alain Resnais
- 1967 : La Sixième face du Pentagone de Chris Marker
- 1967 : A bientôt j'espère de Chris Marker/Mario Marret
- 1967 : Lamiel de Jean Aurel
- 1967 : Le Viol de Jacques Doniol-Volcroze
- 1967 : La Chinoise de Jean-Luc Godard
- 1967 : Loin du Vietnam du Collectif : J.L.Godard, W.Klein, J.Ivens, C.Lelouch, Ch.Marker, A.Varda
- 1967 : 17th Parallel: Vietnam in War de Joris Ivens, Marceline Loridan
- 1967 : Week-end de Jean-Luc Godard
- 1967 : Mexico, Mexico de François Reichenbach
- 1967 : Rotterdam de Joris Ivens
- 1968 : One Plus One de Jean-Luc Godard
- 1968 : Mr. Freedom de William Klein
- 1968 : Le Grabuge d'Edouard Luntz
- 1968 : Three de James Salter
- 1968 : Nous n'irons plus au bois de Georges Dumoulin
- 1968 : L'amour c'est gai, l'amour c'est triste de Jean-Daniel Pollet
- 1968 : Classe de lutte du Groupe Medvedkine (Pol Cèbe)
- 1968 : Sept jours ailleurs de Marin Karmitz
- 1969 : La Panaf (Festival Panafricain) de William Klein
- 1969 : Eldridge Cleaver de William Klein
- 1969 : Tout peut arriver de Philippe Labro
- 1969 : Le Dernier Saut d'Edouard Luntz
- 1969 : La Maison des bories de Jacques Doniol-Volcroze
- 1969 : Lettres de Stalingrad de Gilles Kast
- 1969 : Le peuple et ses fusils de Joris Ivens
- 1969 : La parcelle de Jacques Loiseleux
- 1969 : Wind from the East de Jean-Luc Godard
- 1970 : Popsy Pop de Jean Herman
- 1970 : La fin des Pyrénées de Jean-Pierre Lajournade
- 1970 : Les premiers jours de la vie de Claude Edelman
- 1970 : Nigeria, Nigeria one d'Henri Hervé
- 1970 : Le Soldat Laforêt de Guy Cavagnac
- 1970 : L'Étrangleur de Paul Vecchiali
- 1970 : Vladimir et Rosa de Jean-Luc Godard
- 1970 : Luttes en Italie (Lotte in Italia) de Jean-Luc Godard
- 1970 : British Sounds de Jean-Luc Godard
- 1970 : Amougies (Music Power - European Music Revolution) de Jérôme Laperrousaz
- 1970 : On vous parle du Brésil : Carlos Marighela de Chris Marker
- 1970 : On vous parle de Paris : Les mots ont un sens - François Maspero de Chris Marker
- 1970 : On vous parle de Prague : Le 2^{e} procès d'Arthur London de Chris Marker
- 1970 : Le coup de l'ours de Jean-Pierre Kalfon
- 1971 : Lettre à mon ami Pol Cèbe de Michel Desrois
- 1971 : Paulina 1880 de Jean-Louis Bertuccelli
- 1971 : Week-end à Sochaux de Bruno Muel
- 1971 : La Folie des grandeurs de Gérard Oury
- 1971 : Concerts de Stockhausen au Liban d'Anne-Marie Deshayes
- 1971 : Belle d'André Delvaux
- 1971 : L'homme de feu de Claude Caillou
- 1971 : L'humeur vagabonde d'Edouard Luntz
- 1971 : Lo Païs de Gérard Guérin
- 1971 : Meurtre à la radio de Jacques Bral
- 1971 : Avoir vingt ans dans les Aurès de René Vautier
- 1971 : Le train en marche de Chris Marker
- 1971 : It Only Happens to Others de Nadine Trintignant
- 1971 : Démocratie syndicale de Miroslav Sebestik
- 1971 : La Cicatrice intérieure de Philippe Garrel
- 1972 : Athanor de Philippe Garrel
- 1972 : Sans sommation de Bruno Gantillon
- 1972 : Une baleine qui avait mal aux dents de Jacques Bral
- 1972 : Une belle fille comme moi de François Truffaut
- 1972 : La Société du spectacle de Guy Debord
- 1972 : Themroc de Claude Faraldo
- 1972 : Les Petits Enfants d'Attila de Jean-Pierre Bastid
- 1972 : Continental Circus de Jérôme Laperrousaz
- 1973 : Gouma de Michel Papatakis
- 1973 : Day for Night de François Truffaut
- 1973 : Last Tango in Paris de Bernardo Bertolucci
- 1973 : La Folle de Toujane de René Vautier
- 1973 : Femmes au soleil de Liliane Dreyfus
- 1973 : L'Inde au féminin de François Chardeaux
- 1973 : L'Homme du fleuve de Jean-Pierre Prévost
- 1973 : La république est morte à Dien Bien Phu de Jérôme Kanapa
- 1973 : Le Mariage à la mode de Michel Mardore
- 1973 : Défense de savoir de Nadine Trintignant
- 1973 : Sweet Movie de Dušan Makavejev
- 1973 : Le Sourire vertical de Robert Lapoujade
- 1973 : Kashima Paradise de Yann Le Masson
- 1973 : Pour les Palestiniens, une Israélienne témoigne d'Edna Politi
- 1973 : Septembre chilien de Bruno Muel
- 1974 : Tendre Dracula de Pierre Grunstein
- 1974 : Le temps d'Emma (Emma Stern) de Liliane de Kermadec
- 1974 : Les Versaillais ont-ils pris Paris ? Niet ! de Jacques Prayer
- 1974 : La nuit du phoque de Jean-Jacques Birgé
- 1974 : Les Noces de porcelaine de Roger Coggio
- 1974 : La solitude du chanteur de fond de Chris Marker
- 1974 : Femmes, femmes de Paul Vecchiali
- 1974 : Zig-Zig de László Szabó
- 1974 : L'Assassin musicien de Benoît Jacquot
- 1974 : India Song de Marguerite Duras
- 1974 : Tabarnac de Claude Faraldo
- 1974 : Hu-Man de Jérôme Laperrousaz
- 1974 : Le Voyage d'Amélie de Daniel Duval
- 1974 : Il pleut toujours où c'est mouillé de Jean-Daniel Simon
- 1974 : Au long de rivière Fango de Sotha
- 1974 : Mort d'un guide de Jacques Ertaud
- 1974 : Histoire de Paul de René Féret
- 1974 : Quand tu disais Valéry de René Vautier
- 1974 : La Bête de Walerian Borowczyk
- 1974 : Tout bas de Noël Simsolo
- 1974 : Lutte d'aujourd'hui de Miroslav Sebestik
- 1974 : Si j'te cherche, j'me trouve de Roger Diamantis
- 1975 : L'Homme du fleuve de Jean-Pierre Prévost
- 1975 : Les Fleurs du miel de Claude Faraldo
- 1975 : Je t'aime moi non plus de Serge Gainsbourg
- 1975 : Je suis Pierre Rivière de Christine Lipinska
- 1975 : Le Voyage de noces de Nadine Trintignant
- 1975 : Ce gamin, là de Renaud Victor
- 1975 : Les bicots-nègres vos voisins de Med Hondo
- 1975 : Le Graphique de Boscop de Sotha et George Dumoulin
- 1975 : Interview de Benjamin Murmelstein (film Le Dernier des injustes de Claude Lanzmann, sorti en 2013)
- 1975 : Les Jours gris d'Iradj Azimi
- 1975 : L'Affiche rouge de Frank Cassenti
- 1975 : Guerre du peuple en Angola de Marcel Trillat-Bruno Muel-Antoine Bonfanti-Michel Desrois
- 1975 : Pierre Molinier - 7, rue des Tourets de Noël Simsolo
- 1975 : Gloria Mundi de Nikos Papatakis
- 1975 : Daguerréotypes d'Agnès Varda
- 1976 : Dernière sortie avant Roissy de Bernard Paul
- 1976 : Le Rouge de Chine de Jacques Richard
- 1976 : El Cine soy yo de Luis Armando Roche
- 1976 : Les Ambassadeurs de Nacer Ktari
- 1976 : Quatorze juillet(s) de Jacques Prayer
- 1976 : Mademoiselle K. de Robert Faurous Palacio
- 1976 : Le jardin des Hespérides de Jacques Robiolles
- 1976 : Le Grand Soir de Francis Reusser
- 1976 : L'adieu nu de Jean-Henri Meunier
- 1976 : Le Berceau de cristal de Philippe Garrel
- 1976 : Les Enfants du placard de Benoît Jacquot
- 1976 : La Communion solennelle de René Féret
- 1976 : La Spirale de Armand Mattelart, Valérie Mayoux et Jacqueline Meppiel
- 1976 : Goldflocken de Werner Schroeter
- 1977 : Promesse d'été d'Olivier Delilez
- 1977 : La machine de Paul Vecchiali
- 1977 : Sauf dimanches et fêtes de François Ode
- 1977 : Le vingt-troisième cessez-le-feu de Jean-François Dars, Anne Papillault
- 1977 : En l'autre bord de Jérôme Kanapa
- 1977 : Le Théâtre des matières de Jean Claude Biette
- 1977 : Le Fond de l'air est rouge de Chris Marker
- 1977 : Une page d'amour de Jean Rabinovitch
- 1977 : La triple mort du 3^{e} personnage d'Helvio Soto
- 1977 : Faz la Coragem, Camarada de Ruy Duarte de Carvalho
- 1978 : Utopia d'Iradj Azimi
- 1978 : Les Aventures de Holly et Wood 1ère part.de Robert Pansard-Besson
- 1978 : Exit seven d'Emile Degelin
- 1978 : L'arrêt au milieu de Jean-Pierre Sentier
- 1978 : Dierick Boots d'André Delvaux
- 1978 : La balle perdue de Jean-Luc Miesch
- 1978 : Les petits enfants du jazz d'A.Weinberger
- 1978 : Femme entre chien et loup d'André Delvaux
- 1978 : Corps à cœur de Paul Vecchiali
- 1978 : Grands soirs et petits matins de William Klein
- 1978 : Les Belles Manières de Jean-Claude Guiguet
- 1978 : Plurielles de Jean-Patrick Lebel
- 1978 : Le coup du singe d'Ode Bitton et Jean-Pierre Kalfon
- 1978 : L'animal en question de Vladimir Pozner
- 1978 : Angela Davis de Jacqueline Meppiel
- 1978 : La fête aujourd'hui de Maria Koleva
- 1978 : Rue du Pied de Grue de Jean-Jacques Grand-Jouan
- 1978 : Seize minutes vingt secondes de Miroslav Sebestik
- 1978 : Images de femmes - Location de Noël Simsolo
- 1978 : Le Rose et le Blanc de Robert Pansard-Besson
- 1979 : West Indies ou les nègres marrons de la liberté de Med Hondo
- 1979 : Extérieur, nuit de Jacques Bral
- 1979 : Lettre de Benjamin de Simone Boruchowicz
- 1979 : Simone Barbès ou la vertu de Marie-Claude Treilhou
- 1979 : Série indienne : Les Bauls - Calcutta - Bénarès – Konarak de Georges Luneau
- 1979 : Des quetsches pour l'hiver de Jean-Paul Menichetti
- 1979 : Hé ! Tu m'entends ? de Renaud Victor
- 1979 : Les Derviches-tourneurs de Pierre-Marie Goulet
- 1979 : Tout dépend des filles de Pierre Fabre
- 1979 : Tartan Jacket de Cécile Clairval
- 1979 : Yamar Fiesta de Luis Figueroa
- 1979 : Estraburgo en Chile de Philippe Avril (film producer)
- 1979 : Grenade d'Olivier Landau
- 1979 : Chants de l'aube de Noël Simsolo
- 1980 : Parano de Bernard Dubois
- 1980 : Haine de Dominique Goult
- 1980 : Cauchemar de Noël Simsolo
- 1980 : C'est la vie de Paul Vecchiali
- 1980 : Le Jardinier de Jean-Pierre Sentier
- 1980 : Les aventures de Holly et Wood 2^{e} part. de Robert Pansard-Besson
- 1980 : Les anciens du Vercors de Bruno Muel
- 1980 : Karim de François Ode
- 1980 : Instinct de femme de Claude Othnin-Girard
- 1980 : Souvenir inoubliable de Philippe Nahoun
- 1980 : Oxalá d'António Pedro Vasconcelos
- 1980 : Comme la mer et ses vagues d'Edna Politi
- 1980 : Les Brus de Juan Luis Buñuel
- 1980 : Guns de Robert Kramer
- 1980 : Le regard des autres de Fernando Ezequiel Solanas
- 1980 : Plogoff des pierres contre des fusils de Nicole le Garrec
- 1980 : Court circuits de Patrick Grandperret
- 1981 : Pan-pan de Noël Simsolo
- 1981 : Les Îles d'Iradj Azimi
- 1981 : Corre Gitano de Tony Gatlif
- 1981 : Les Filles de Grenoble de Joël Le Moign'
- 1981 : Sans soleil de Chris Marker
- 1981 : Lettres d'amour en Somalie de Frédéric Mitterrand
- 1982 : Ava Basta de Marie-Jeanne Tomasi
- 1982 : Salut la puce de Richard Balducci
- 1982 : Nous étions tous des noms d'arbres d'Armand Gatti
- 1982 : L'anniversaire de Thomas de Jean-Paul Menichetti
- 1982 : Ana d'António Reis et Margarida Cordeiro
- 1983 : Biotherm de Jérôme Laperrousaz
- 1983 : Site de Pierre-Marie Goulet
- 1983 : La meute de Jean-Paul Dekiss
- 1983 : Un bruit qui court de Jean-Pierre Sentier
- 1983 : Demi-pression de Georges Trillat
- 1983 : Taxi de nuit de Jean-Claude Bonfanti
- 1983 : Mimoria de Simon Lucciani
- 1983 : Point de fuite de Raoul Ruiz
- 1983 : Benvenuta d'André Delvaux
- 1983 : Club Med de Jérôme Laperrousaz
- 1983 : Les frères Baschet de Marc Baschet
- 1983 : Un rendez-vous manqué de François Ode
- 1984 : Juin de Miroslav Sebestik
- 1984 : Le Juge de Philippe Lefebvre
- 1984 : Notre mariage de Valeria Sarmiento
- 1984 : Azzione de J.Simon Peretti
- 1984 : Malavia de Dominique Tiberi
- 1984 : Caméra de Marie-Jeanne Simoni
- 1984 : Overdose de Georges Trillat
- 1984 : Les anges d'Elsie Haas
- 1984 : Comédie de François Ode
- 1984 : O Lugar do Morto de António-Pedro Vasconcelos
- 1984 : 2084 de Chris Marker
- 1984 : Amazonie (série télé) de Jacques-Yves Cousteau
- 1984 : Collages de Sarenco
- 1984 : La légende inachevée de Robert Faurous Palacio
- 1984 : Pouca terra de Saguenail
- 1984 : Drôle d'oiseau de Michel Kania
- 1985 : Rouge-gorge de Pierre Zucca
- 1985 : L'éveillé du pont de l'Alma de Raoul Ruiz
- 1985 : La lézarde de Gérard Lecca
- 1985 : Beau temps mais orageux en fin de journée de Gérard Frot-Coutaz
- 1985 : micro-endoscopie en chambre postérieure de Michel Tomasi
- 1985 : Paulette, la pauvre petite milliardaire de Claude Confortès
- 1985 : Transhumances : Le Retour des chevaux de Vania Villers
- 1985 : Haïti d'Elsie Haas
- 1985 : Ana d'Antonio Reis et Margarida Cordeiro
- 1985 : Rosa la rose, fille publique de Paul Vecchiali
- 1985 : Mourir un peu de Saguenail
- 1986 : Avec sentiment de Paul Vecchiali
- 1986 : Sauveteurs d'Emmanuel Audrain
- 1986 : L'oiseau de feu d'Ann Marchi
- 1986 : U Catalorzu de Dominique Maestrati
- 1986 : Domaine d'Anghione de Michel Tomasi
- 1987 : Plage de Pierre-Marie Goulet
- 1987 : Hold-up d'Yves Pedron
- 1987 : Les demoiselles d'Avignon de Noël Simsolo
- 1987 : Once More ou Encore de Paul Vecchiali
- 1987 : La ronde républicaine de Barbara Gaspary
- 1987 : Les chemins de Zouc de Claude Massot
- 1988 : Matar Saudades de Fernando Lopes
- 1988 : Le Café des Jules de Paul Vecchiali
- 1988 : Transfench de Jean Lefaux
- 1988 : Albanie de Jean-Pierre Graziani
- 1988 : Malincunia de Dominique Maestrati
- 1988 : Maintenant de Pierre-Marie Goulet
- 1988 : Berlin-Jérusalem (1^{re} partie) d'Amos Gitaï
- 1988 : Saint-Algue d'Yves Pedron
- 1988 : Les camps du silence de Bernard Mangiante
- 1988 : L'Œuvre au noir d'André Delvaux
- 1988 : Une fille d'Henri Herré
- 1988 : L'horloge du village de Philippe Costantini
- 1988 : Jiri Kolar d'Ann Marchi
- 1989 : l'amour en latin de Saguenail
- 1989 : Berlin-Jérusalem (2^{e} partie) d'Amos Gitaï
- 1989 : 1001 films d'André Delvaux
- 1989 : Bona sera (or La bouteille de gaz) d'Henri Graziani
- 1989 : Nef de Gabriel le Bomin
- 1989 : Engins d'Yves Pedron
- 1989 : La déclaration des droits de l'homme de Raoul Ruiz
- 1989 : L'homme en blanc d'Yves Pedron
- 1989 : L'homme de terre de Boris Lehman
- 1989 : La mémoire des îles d'Emmanuel Audrain
- 1989 : Cristofanu Columbu de Toni Casalonga
- 1989 : Les cousins d'Amérique de Philippe Costantini
- 1990 : Le cantique des pierres de Michel Khleifi
- 1990 : Roman-photos de Carole Scotta
- 1990 : Giorno di rabbia de Thomas Langmann
- 1990 : Impetrata de Dominique Tiberi
- 1990 : Le Voyage étranger de Serge Roullet
- 1990 : Babel de Boris Lehman
- 1990 : De l'autre côté du miroir de Dominique Maestrati
- 1991 : Alba Mossa d'Yves de Peretti
- 1991 : Golem, l'esprit de l'exil d'Amos Gitaï
- 1991 : 1, 2, 3, soleil ! de Marie-Jeanne Simoni
- 1991 : Comedie musicale de Christian Blanchet
- 1991 : Madunaccia ou Nous deux d'Henri Graziani
- 1991 : Babilée 91 de William Klein
- 1991 : Rosa Negra de Margarida Gil
- 1991 : Marie Atger d'Anita Fernandez
- 1991 : Matria de Jacky Micaelli
- 1991 : Entre ciel et mer de Gabriel le Bomin
- 1991 : La voie royale de Dominique Maestrati
- 1992 : Golem, le jardin pétrifié d'Amos Gitaï
- 1992 : Chronique d'une banlieue ordinaire de Dominique Cabrera
- 1992 : Noces de sable de Véronique Lindberg
- 1992 : Faits et dits de Nasreddin (Hodja) de Pierre-Marie Goulet
- 1993 : Tripot au feu de Jean-Jacques Privas
- 1993 : Jeu fatal d'Omar Chraïbi
- 1993 : Le soir de l'Angelus d'Aymeric de Valon
- 1993 : Le Fond de l'air est rouge - v.ang. de Chris Marker
- 1993 : La chevelure de Bérénice d'Ann Marchi
- 1993 : Portrait d'un mineur (Raconte grand-père) de Jean-Luc Debeve
- 1993 : Tap-tap d'Elsie Haas
- 1993 : À la recherche du mari de ma femme de Mohamed Abderrahman Tazi
- 1994 : La parabole corse d'Ange Casta
- 1994 : Asientos de François Woukoache
- 1994 : Les Égarés de Gabriel Le Bomin
- 1994 : De sueur et de sang (Wonder Boy) de Paul Vecchiali
- 1994 : Leçon de vie de Boris Lehman
- 1995 : Marques et traces de Noël Simsolo
- 1996 : Cocteau - Mensonges et vérités de Noël Simsolo
- 1996-97 : Debout dans ce siècle anthracite de Christiane Rorato
- 1997 : La montagne de Baya de Azzedine Meddour
- 1998 : Cubafroamérica de Maryvon Le Brishoual-Bonfanti
- 1999 : Le blanc de Bilbalogo (Burkina-Faso) de Maryvon Le Brishoual-Bonfanti
- 1999 : San Bartuli - l'écho de La Castagniccia de Maryvon Le Brishoual-Bonfanti
- 2002 : Fragile comme le monde de Rita Azevedo

== Awards ==
In 1977 Bonfanti was nominated for the César Award for Best Sound for his work on the film Je t'aime moi non plus, directed by Serge Gainsbourg.

== Publication ==
- Bonfanti, Antoine; Ley, Pierre (1993). "Le film". In Eyrolles (ed.). Le Livre des Techniques du Son, Tome 3 : L'exploitation (in French). Paris. pp. 327–389.
