= Film Fest Gent =

Annual film festival in Belgium

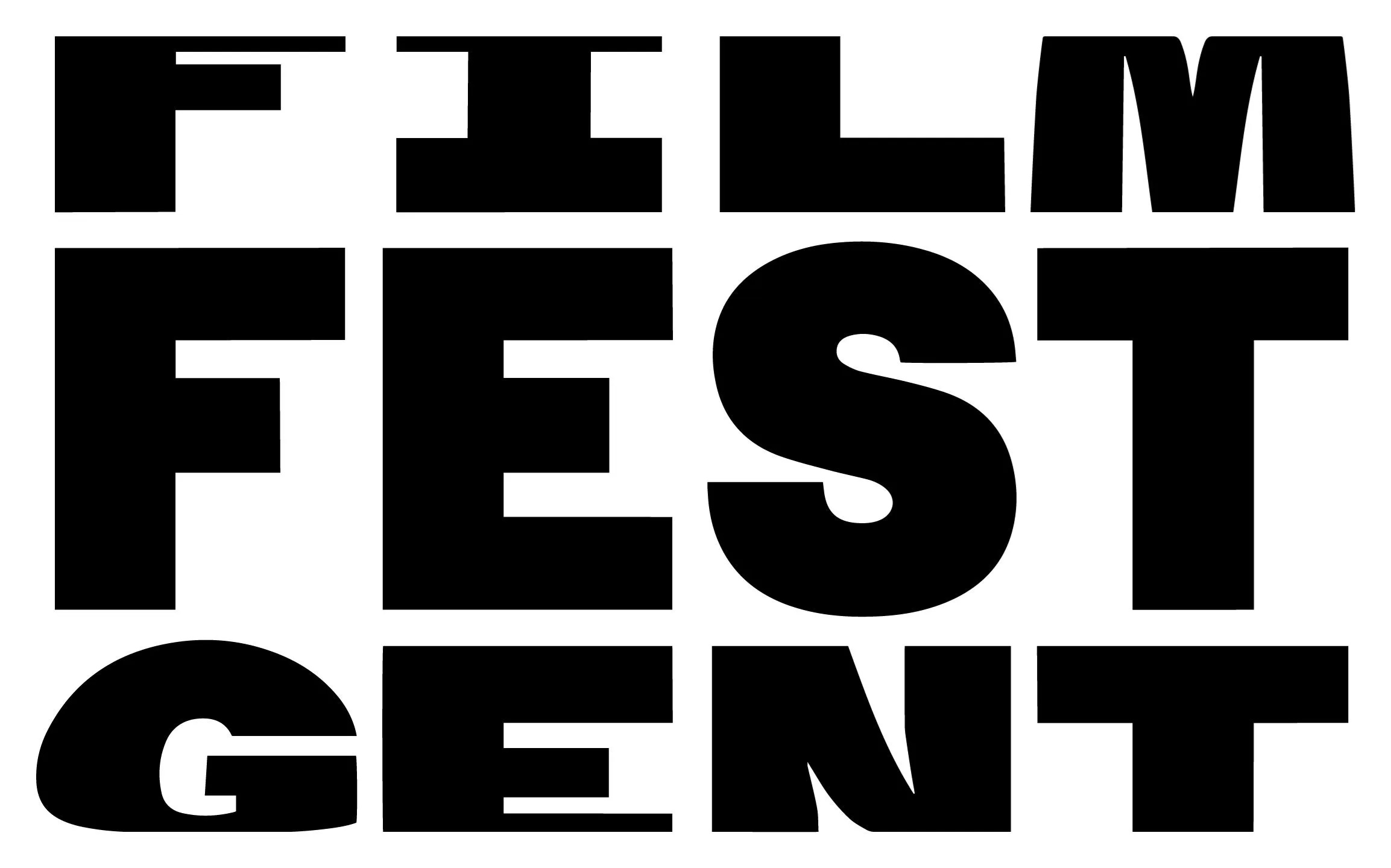
- Location: Ghent, Belgium
- Founded: 1974
- Awards: Grand Prix for Best Film
- Festival date: 7–18 October 2026 (53st edition)
- Website: filmfestival.be/en

Film Fest Gent, also known as International Film Fest Gent, is an annual international film festival in Ghent, Belgium. The festival held its first edition in 1974, under the name Internationaal Filmgebeuren Gent, and has since grown into the largest film festival in Belgium. The festival also puts the spotlight on film music; since 2001, Film Fest Gent has hosted the World Soundtrack Awards, a series of prizes for the best soundtracks for film and television.

The festival takes place every year in October, with an international jury awarding the Grand Prix for Best Film and the Georges Delerue Award for Best Soundtrack or Sound Design. Apart from the official competition, there are sections such as global cinema, classics, and an annual special focus.

From 2000 to 2018, a European short film competition was organised. In 2019, the short film competition was reformed into an international competition, with the International Short Film Award as the main prize.

== History ==
=== 1974-1978 ===
Under the name 'Het Eerste Internationaal Filmgebeuren van Gent' (or 'Ghent's First International Film Event'), the very first 'Film Fest Ghent' took place from 25 to 31 January 1974. The driving forces behind the initiative were Ben Ter Elst, manager of the Studio Skoop, and Dirk De Meyer of the Ghent University Film Club. Their aim was to programme films that did not get a chance in the regular cinemas because of their content and style. The first small-scale edition had about twenty titles on the menu and was screened in Studio Skoop and in the Capitool. The programme included Solaris by Andrei Tarkovsky and Winter Wind by Miklós Jancsó, films that provoke, innovate and cast a different light on what cinema can be. This way, the event launched new names and stimulated interest in arthouse cinema. It laid the foundation for a film festival that offers a wide-ranging panorama of world cinema.

In 1978, 'Het Internationaal Filmgebeuren van Gent' grew into a film festival that presented about fifty films in various sections. Gradually, more and more attention was paid to film education and a festival offer that would appeal to various target audiences. During the year of 1978, cinephiles could find something to their liking among author films by, for instance, Luis Buñuel, Rainer Werner Fassbinder, Bernardo Bertolucci and Alejandro Jodorowsky. However, due to the exponential growth of the festival, there was a great desire for a clear structure. Even more so, since the international film landscape evolved rapidly at the time, the event encountered several organisational and financial problems despite the success of the initiative. The festival thus needed a fresh and new organisational structure in order to reach international maturity.

=== 1979-1984 ===
Jacques Dubrulle, active in film production and communication, gave a fresh impetus to the suffering festival. He developed a much-needed structure and in 1979 he founded a non-profit organisation that served as the essential backbone of the festival. The creation of this non-profit organisation ensured that the authorities (the city of Ghent, the province of East Flanders, the federal and (later) the Flemish government) would participate and contribute financially. Within this structure, John Bultinck became the very first chairman.

In this period, the festival was booming due to further internationalisation and an impressive guest list. Amongst others, King Hu, Maximillian Schell and Bertrand Tavernier paid a visit to Ghent. In 1981, thanks to the inauguration of the Decascoop complex (today's Kinepolis), Ghent welcomed a new cinema with spacious cinema theatres and state-of-the-art technology. On top of that, the programme expanded to about a hundred films. The modernisation of the festival thus ensured a much broader audience and offer. In 1983, the non-profit organisation changed its name to 'Internationaal Filmgebeuren van Vlaanderen-Gent' (or 'International Film Event of Flanders-Ghent'). The enthusiastic team helped to ensure that the festival figured as a hallmark of high-quality cinema.

=== 1985-1992 ===
The year of 1985 marked the beginning of the mass development of the film festival. Both organisationally and financially, the festival evolved into a cultural event of the first order. The significant growth of the event was enabled by a permanent team working on the festival all year round. Moreover, the team managed to develop a long-term vision for the film festival. In search of an identity and a place of its own in an overcrowded film festival calendar, brainstorming sessions were held together with Festival of Flanders, a festival dedicated to classical music. As a result, film music became an important focus of the film festival. In 1985, the International Film Event of Flanders-Ghent organised an international competition with a jury for the first time. André Delvaux, Michael White, Simon Heyworth, Alain Pierre and Loek Dikker were members of the first jury. The main theme of the competition was 'the impact of music on film', a theme that was not on the agenda of any other film festival in the world.

Besides the competition, the festival also decided to organise silent film screenings with newly composed music that was performed live. One of the highlights was the performance of a new score by Georges Delerue for the Russian Casanova (1927) in 1987. Delerue conducted the work himself in a packed Ghent opera. That same year Ennio Morricone gave a concert in a sold-out Kuipke in Ghent. This way, the film festival became an established name in the film music circuit. Other internationally renowned composers such as Jean-Claude Petit, Nicola Piovani, Peer Raben, Stanley Myers, Carl Davis, Bruce Broughton and Michael Nyman also attended the festival to perform their work.

In 1985, the festival presented its first Joseph Plateau Award during the Night of Film. The prize is named after the professor Joseph Plateau from Ghent and is awarded to Belgian film makers who have made a significant contribution to the Belgian film industry. Later the prize would evolve into the Joseph Plateau Honorary Award, a lifetime achievement award for someone from the international film world. In 1992 Jacques Dubrulle and his team decided to change the name 'Filmgebeuren' into 'Film Festival'. During the 90s the International Film Festival of Flanders-Ghent even received several film titles in European or world premieres and hosted big names such as Willem Dafoe, Samuel Fuller, Terry Gilliam, Anthony Perkins, Charlotte Rampling, Paul Schrader, Frederick Wiseman, Patricia Arquette, Kenneth Branagh, Mel Brooks, Crispin Clover, Paul Cox, Atom Egoyan etc.

=== 1993-1999 ===
In March 1993 the Flemish government declared the International Film Festival of Flanders-Ghent Cultural Ambassador of Flanders. The financial support of the Flemish government resulted in a cash prize for the winner of the international competition. Five years later, the festival was appointed City Ambassador of Ghent. The Ghent-based film festival grew into the biggest film event in Belgium and increasingly attracted more international attention. Famous foreign guests found their way to Ghent. Robert Altman, Elmer Bernstein, Terence Davies, Arthur Penn, James Earl Jones, Guy Pearce, Karl Malden, Danny Glover, Michael Haneke, Irvin Kershner and many others visited Ghent during these years. The focus on film music also continued. A new part of the musical programme was introduced: in 1993 the festival organised a symposium on film music for the first time. Despite the fact that film music did not immediately steal the spotlight in the media, it was an important step for the International Film Festival of Flanders-Ghent to acquire a pilot function. The festival aimed to support young composers and to safeguard the preservation and evolution of film music. The godfather of Belgian film music, Frédéric Devreese, conducted a double concert during the same edition in the then newly reopened Vlaamse Opera Ghent. At this point, film music was firmly anchored in the DNA of the festival.

=== 2000-2007 ===
The International Film Festival of Flanders-Ghent started the new millennium with an increased interest in the short film genre. In 2000, the audience enjoyed the first European short film competition. Later, in 2019, the festival would open the competition to short films from all over the world, giving short films the full attention they deserve.

The festival was the first in the world to emphasise the importance of film music. Over the years it has organised classical concerts, silent film projections with live music, seminars on film music and hosted important composers. The festival continued to play this pioneering role in the 2000s. In 2000, the film composer Hans Zimmer was convinced to come to Ghent for his first-ever live performance of his film scores in the presence of Morgan Freeman and Lisa Gerrard. The need to put all the contacts between composers, musicians and agents who attend the festival each year into a fixed structure grew bigger. This is why the festival (led by Jacques Dubrulle, music projects coordinator Marian Ponnet and Brussels Philharmonic conductor Dirk Brossé) launched the World Soundtrack Academy in 2001. During the 2001 edition, the WSA presented the first World Soundtrack Awards. None other than the legendary John Williams received the first Film Composer of the Year Award. The purpose of the WSA is and remains to form an international community for film composers and professionals who promote the art of film music through a series of activities, such as the annual presentation of the World Soundtrack Awards. In 2002, the WSA decided to organise an annual composition contest for young talents. The participants write a new score to an existing film or TV fragment.

The 2000s also saw many prominent guests at the film festival, including Jean Reno, Juliette Binoche, Jeanne Moreau, Blair Underwood, Maurice Jarre, Paul Verhoeven, Darren Aronofsky, Tom Tykwer and Kathleen Turner.

=== 2007–2012 ===
In September 2007, the American film magazine Variety placed the Ghent-based film festival among the fifty not-to-be-missed festivals in the world. Variety made its choice out of more than a thousand film festivals and selected Ghent because of its unique focus on film music. Moreover, the festival is the only one from the Benelux to appear on the list. The mention shows that the International Film Festival of Flanders-Ghent is on the international map. One year later, the prestigious American newspaper The Wall Street Journal also praised the festival. According to the newspaper the International Film Festival of Flanders-Ghent is among the top five European film festivals with its own character.

During this period, the attention for underexposed themes and audiences in the film industry grew gradually. Specific efforts were made to program LGBTQ-films and film screenings for the blind and visually impaired. Professionals also got more involved by organising 'The Day of the Film Profession' and a physical Press & Industry Office. Meanwhile, film school students could obtain accreditation for the festival, with the aim of stimulating the formation of a new generation of filmmakers.

From 2010 onwards, each edition would feature a curated exhibition around an icon of film history. The first exhibition was dedicated to the French film maker Jacques 'Monsieur Hulot' Tati. The following year, former film journalist Patrick Duynslaegher became the artistic director of the festival. In his first edition, Scandinavia took centre stage and the legendary Ingmar Bergman figured as the subject of a retrospective and the annual exhibition.

Many renowned talents from the film industry visited Ghent during the period of 2007 to 2012: Clint Mansell, Woody Harrelson, Richard Jenkins, Andy Garcia, Kevin Costner, Shigeru Umebayashi, László Nemes, Tim Robbins, Paul Greengrass, Jim Sheridan, François Ozon, Norman Jewison, Seth Rogen, Isabelle Huppert, Ezra Miller, Emmannuelle Riva, Paolo & Vittori Taviani, Jean-Pierre & Luc Dardenne etc.

=== 2013–2019 ===
The 40th edition of the film festival took place in 2013. During this year, the film festival underwent a few changes. Founder Jacques Dubrulle left the organisation and the power within the board was redistributed. The festival underwent a real transformation and celebrated this festive year with a new name: Film Fest Ghent. The very first edition under the new name focused on American Independent Cinema. During the festival Dubrulle received the Joseph Plateau Honorary Award for his years of commitment to the organisation of Film Fest Ghent. From this period onwards, the organisation of Film Fest Ghent decided to support a good cause every edition, with the goal of raising money and bringing films to an audience that cannot always afford to go to the cinema.

The following year, the festival focused on French cinema. Catherine Deneuve (in Belle de jour) was on the official festival poster. The festival also celebrated the centenary of Chaplin's iconic character of the tramp with screenings of The Circus (in Kuipke Ghent with live music) and The Gold Rush (in the Stadshal of Ghent). Erik Van Looy's much hyped film Loft opened the festival and later became one of the greatest Belgian films of all time (in its own country). The annual exhibition was entirely devoted to the oeuvre of Italian filmmaker Federico Fellini. To enhance the exhibition, a concert was organised with film music by Nino Rota for Fellini's films.

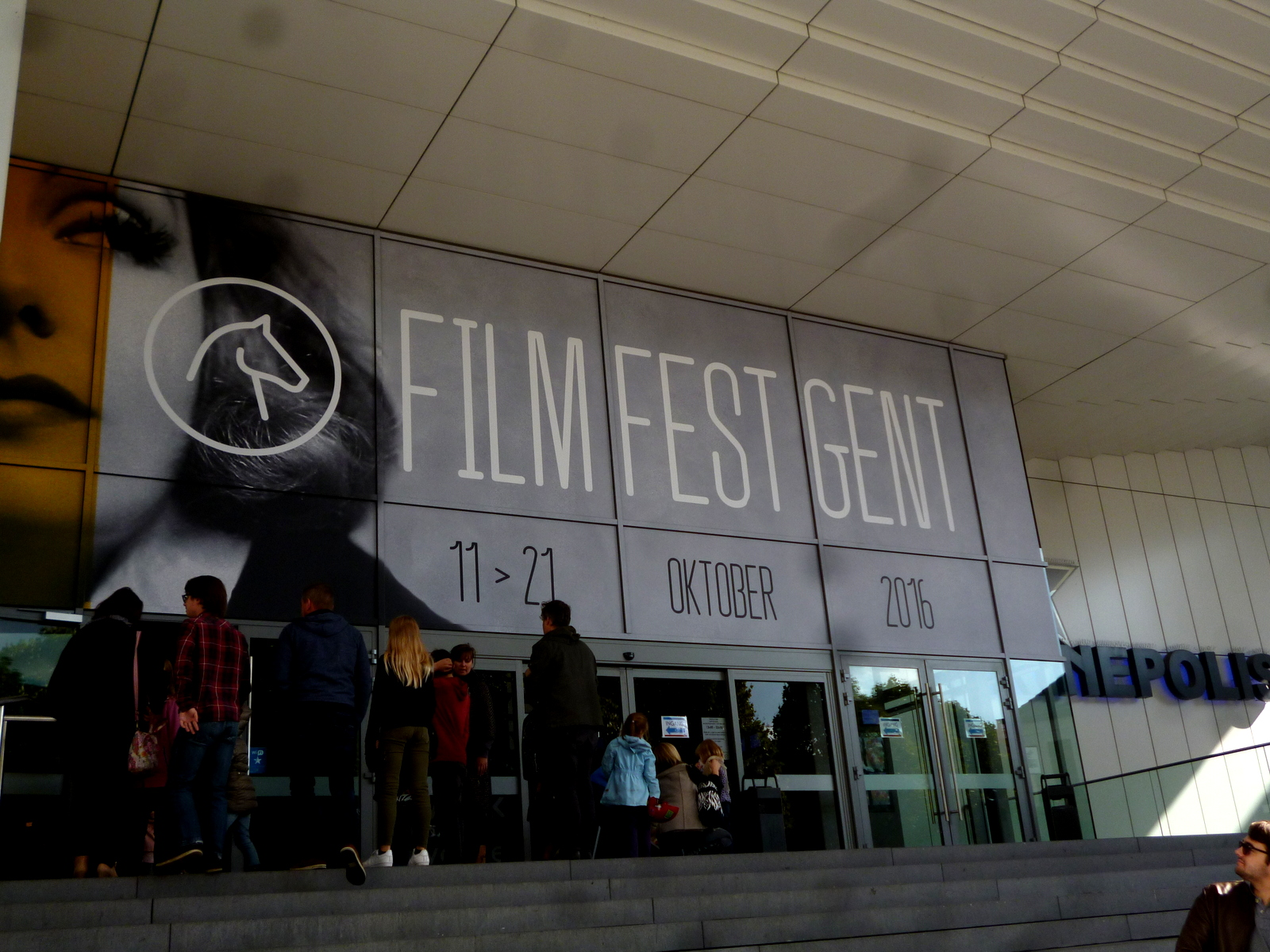
Kinepolis Gent entrance in 2016

The following editions paid special attention to British, Nordic, Italian, Hungarian and Spanish cinema. In 2016, Japan took centre stage and Film Fest Ghent welcomed composer Ryuichi Sakamoto to the World Soundtrack Awards Gala where he received the Lifetime Achievement Award. The 2017 edition, with Italy as the central country, promoted itself with Claudia Cardinale on the campaign image. The music section drew attention to the centenary of jazz with a Symphonic Jazz Concert and the laudation of trumpeter and jazz musician Terence Blanchard at the WSA. The 2018 edition of Film Fest Ghent had a Hungarian focus, and a retrospective was organised presenting the films of Miklós Jancsó. That edition kicked off with the premiere of Girl, one of the most lauded Belgian films with, among others, a Caméra d'Or for director Lukas Dhont at the Cannes Film Festival. There also were some new things to discover in terms of music. Vooruit and Film Fest Ghent presented a unique crossover between film and music called 'Videodroom', which became an annual part of the festival. Guest of honour at the WSA was Carter Burwell, mainly known for his collaborations with the Coen brothers. For the very first time, his music was performed live.

In 2019, Wim De Witte, who has been active in the organisation for years, succeeded Patrick Duynslaegher as artistic director. The film programme included a focus on Spain with a series of contemporary Spanish films and a retrospective of taboo-breaking Spanish filmmakers such as Luis Buñuel, Agustí Villaronga, Victor Erice, Alejandro Amenábar and Pedro Almodóvar. During this year, Film Fest Ghent also decided to endeavour for a revaluation of the short film genre. For the first time, the international short film competition received short films from all over the world and became a more prominent part of the festival programme. In addition, the Belgian student short film competition was already well-established within the festival for years. Marco Beltrami was the guest of honour at the World Soundtrack Awards Gala. At the gala, Film Fest Ghent and the World Soundtrack Academy honoured the renowned Belgian film music composer Frédéric Devreese with a live performance of his music for films such as Un soir, un train and Benvenuta.

During the period of 2013 to 2019, the following guests found their way to Film Fest Ghent: Joseph Gordon-Levitt, Bret Easton Ellis, Sergei Loznitsa, Yorgos Lanthimos, Colin Farrell, Sir Alan Parker, Michael Nyman, Craig Armstrong, Alan Silvestri, Ryuichi Sakamoto, Kôji Fukada, Terence Davies, Tran Anh Hung, Ken Loach, Olivier Assayas, Derek Cianfrance, Asghar Farhadi, Isabelle Huppert, Leila Hatami, Geraldine Chaplin, Rian Johnson, Thomas Vinterberg, John C. Reilly, Jacques Audiard, Terence Blanchard and Jayro Bustamante.

=== 2020 ===
In 2020, Film Fest Ghent was forced to adapt the festival to a different format, due to the COVID-19 pandemic. The team opted for a hybrid festival with both physical screenings and screenings on a VOD platform. The programme focused on German cinema, and also included a new section entitled "Official Selection: Masters & New Voices". The retrospective was dedicated to the Neue Deutsche Welle, with films by Fassbinder, Herzog, Wenders, Margarethe von Trotta, Helma Sanders-Brahms and others. The most important international guests were actor-director Viggo Mortensen, who presented his directorial debut Falling and received the Joseph Plateau Honorary Award, the author-director Pedro Costa and the French actress-director Maïwenn.

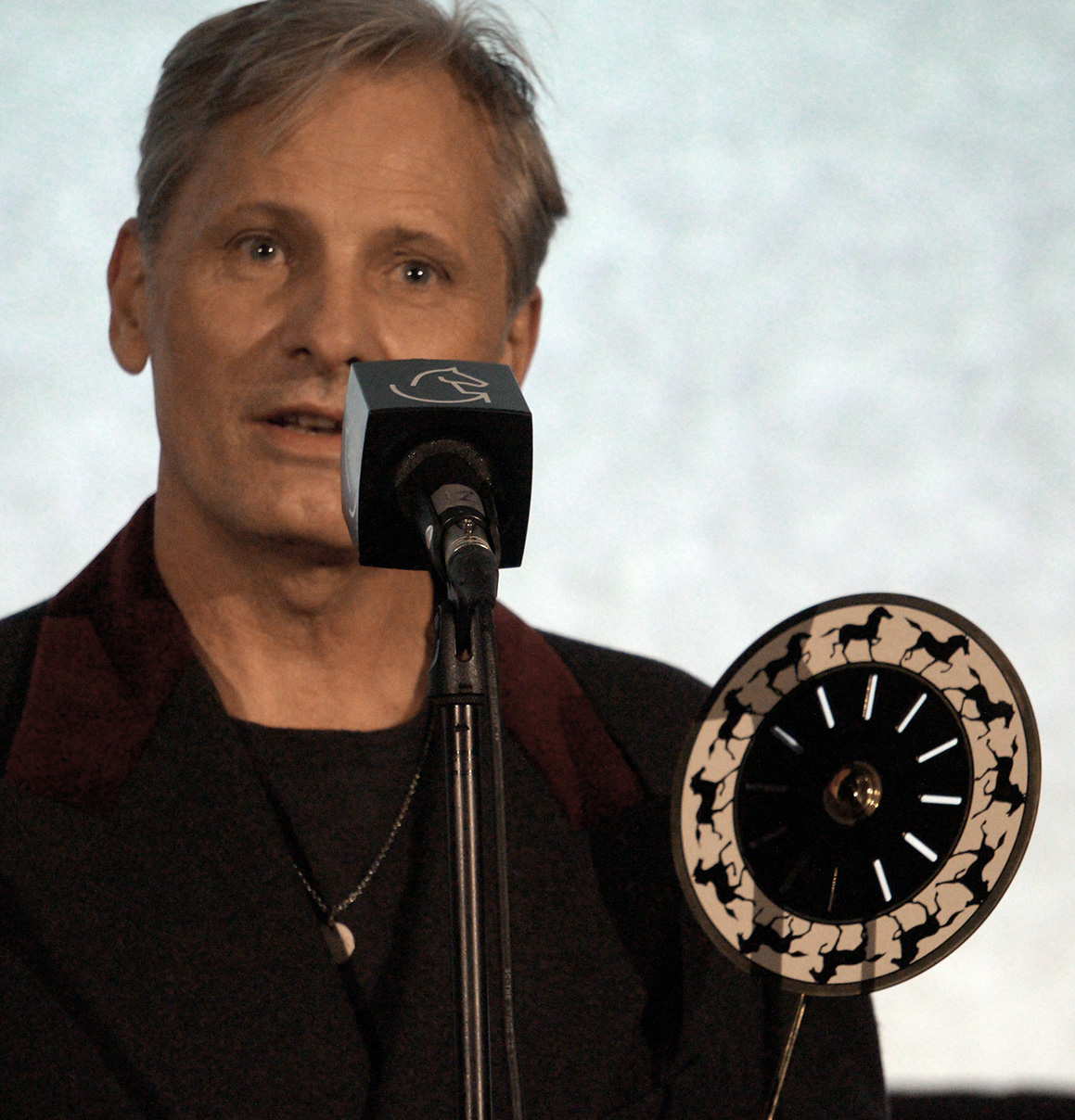
Viggo Mortensen's acceptance speech for the Plateau Award in 2020

During this edition, the festival wanted to show solidarity with filmmakers, cinemas and colleagues who had to cancel their festivals due to the health crisis. All participants and audiences wore masks.

The year also marked the 20th anniversary of the World Soundtrack Awards, which took place online and was able to be followed around the world via livestream. Gabriel Yared performed his compositions live, and audiences could see the reactions from composers such as Alexandre Desplat, Hildur Guðnadóttir and Nicholas Britell. For the occasion, Screen magazine published a supplement to the World Soundtrack Awards, highlighting the history of the awards and guests of honour Desplat, Yared and Michael Abels.

=== 2021 ===
The 48th edition of Film Fest Gent explores the Greek film world, which has been revived internationally since the “Greek Weird Wave”. Looking back at a tumultuous past, the ‘Classics’ are entirely devoted to the oeuvre of Theo Angelopoulos. The festival opens with the Belgian thriller La Civil by Teodora Ana Mihai. Wes Anderson's The French Dispatch closes the programme. As a theme, the festival highlights positive aggression with the programme tag 'Why We Fight', while supporting non-profit organisation Touché. Gaspar Noé’s emotionally overwhelming film Vortex wins the Grand Prix. Film Fest Gent honours two directors with a Joseph Plateau Honorary Award: Andrea Arnold and Harry Kümel. Notable guests at FFG2021 include Pablo Larraín, Leos Carax, Ari Folman, Miguel Gomes, Radu Jude and Avi Mograbi. The World Soundtrack Awards welcomes Max Richter as guest of honour. Nainita Desai wins the award for Discovery of the Year. Greek composer Eleni Karaindrou receives the Lifetime Achievement Award. The main prize at WSA (Film Composer of the Year) goes to Daniel Pemberton.

=== 2022 ===
The 49th Film Fest Gent features a challenging programme of films from around the globe. 'Veerkracht' (resilience) forms one of the themes of the festival, linked to a solidarity action for the OverKop house in Ghent. Because of its enormous popularity and quality, this edition puts a spotlight on South Korean cinema, with a separate section in the film programme, a retrospective and a film music concert. In the film competition Alice Diop's French courtroom drama Saint Omer wins the Grand Prix. In a year in which Belgian cinema reaches international success, the opening film Close by Lukas Dhont generates a lot of buzz. Closing film is Maria Schrader's investigative drama She Said, based on a true story. Once again, a large number of (inter)national filmmakers travels to Ghent. Among them: Céline Sciamma. She talks to Lukas Dhont after a screening of her Petite Maman. For which she receives the Joseph Plateau Honorary Award. The Belgian animation pioneer Raouls Servais also receives this award, when presenting his new film Der lange Kerl. The 22nd edition of the World Soundtrack Awards welcomes American film composer and jazz artist Mark Isham as the guest of honour. The Lifetime Achievement Award goes to French composer Bruno Coulais. Eiko Ishibashi receives the Discovery of the Year Award in addition.

=== 2023 ===
In 2023, Film Fest Gent celebrates its 50th edition with a make-overm including a new logo. On top of that, FFG is stomping out a unique project: 2x25, in which 25 filmmakers will make a short film inspired by music by 25 composers. The festival opened with a homegrown film: Holly, Fien Troch's fifth feature. Anime legend Hayao Miyazaki signs for the closing film The Boy and the Heron. Los delincuentes by Rodrigo Moreno wins the Grand Prix for best film. A Joseph Plateau Honorary Award is presented posthumously to director Terence Davies. For this anniversary edition, past and present come together thanks to Classics curator Patrick Duynslaegher. He delved into the Film Fest Gent archives and distilled a programme of films and filmmakers who have made a striking contribution to the history of the festival. Despite competition from the robust programme of avant-premières, classics such as The Cook, The Thief, His Wife and Her Lover (Peter Greenaway), Novecento (Roberto Bertolucci) and A Brighter Summer Day (Edward Yang) managed to attract packed theatres.

=== 2024 ===
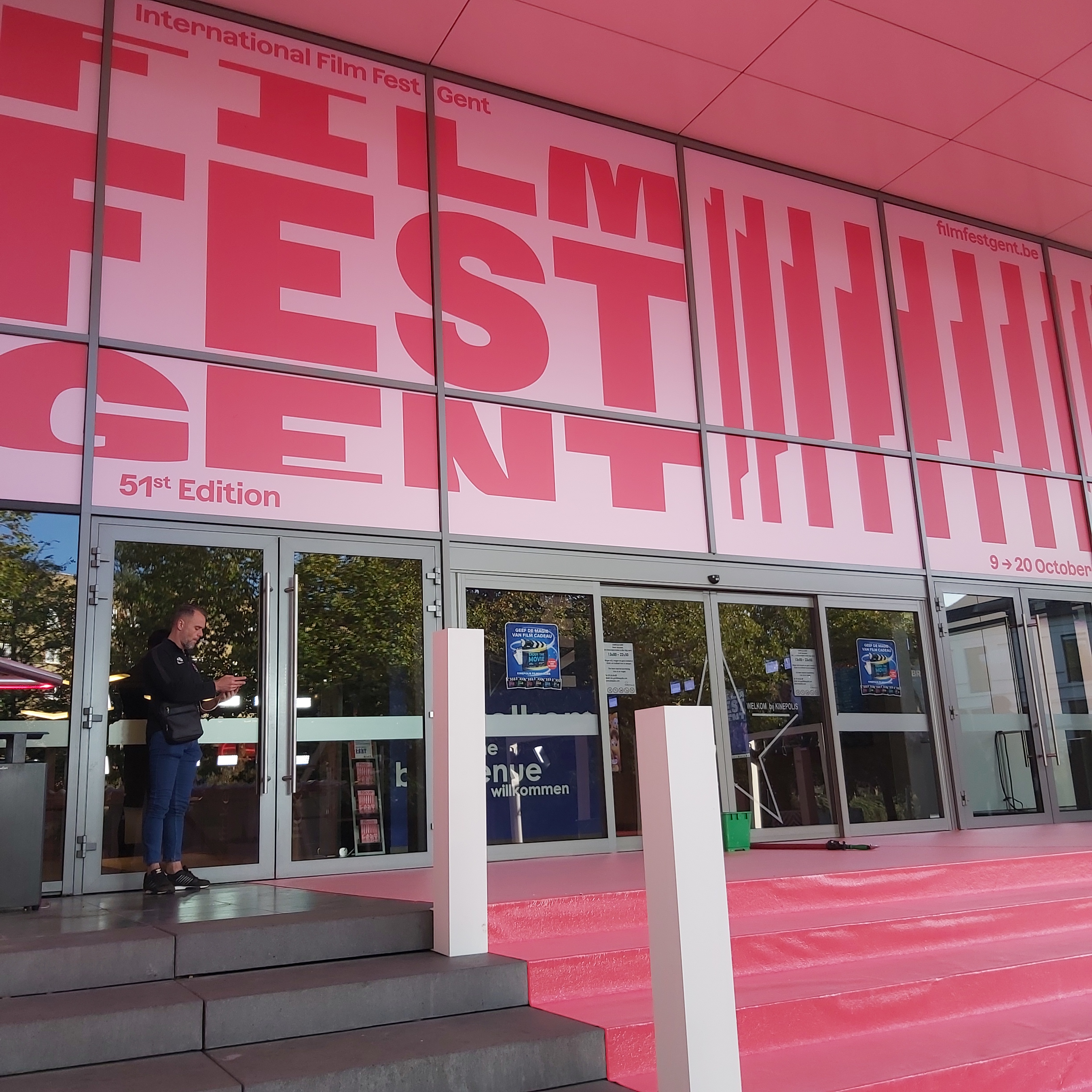
Kinepolis Gent entrance in 2024

The film programme for the 51st edition of Film Fest Gent focused on both the tension between fact and fiction and the universal experiences of grief and saying goodbye. The festival kicked off on 8 October with director Tim Mielants’ Irish-Belgian historical drama Small Things Like These. The Grand Prix for Best Film went to Super Happy Forever, a poetic exploration of grief, healing and the miraculous resilience of love, written and directed by Kohei Igarashi. Grand Tour (Miguel Gomes) was awarded the Georges Delerue Award for Best Soundtrack. For the fourth year running, two Joseph Plateau Honorary Awards were presented. Both British actress Emily Watson and Palestinian filmmaker Michel Khleifi received the award. To further honour Khleifi’s humanistic body of work, some of his better-known films were screened once again on the big screen. With the US presidential elections approaching, the Classics programme delved into Hollywood films that depict political uncertainties. Under the theme ‘American Dream / American Nightmare’, both iconic and forgotten classics were screened, including On The Beach (1959), ''Blow Out'' (1981) and ''Dr. Strangelove'' (1964). Well-known guests such as the Irish hip-hop trio Kneecap, César winner Adèle Exarchopoulos (L’amour ouf) and the Dutch novelist Arthur Japin (Een schitterend gebrek) graced the red carpet. The 51st edition was symbolically laid to rest by Dimitri Verhulst’s directorial debut and his dramedy Waarom Wettelen?

=== 2025 ===
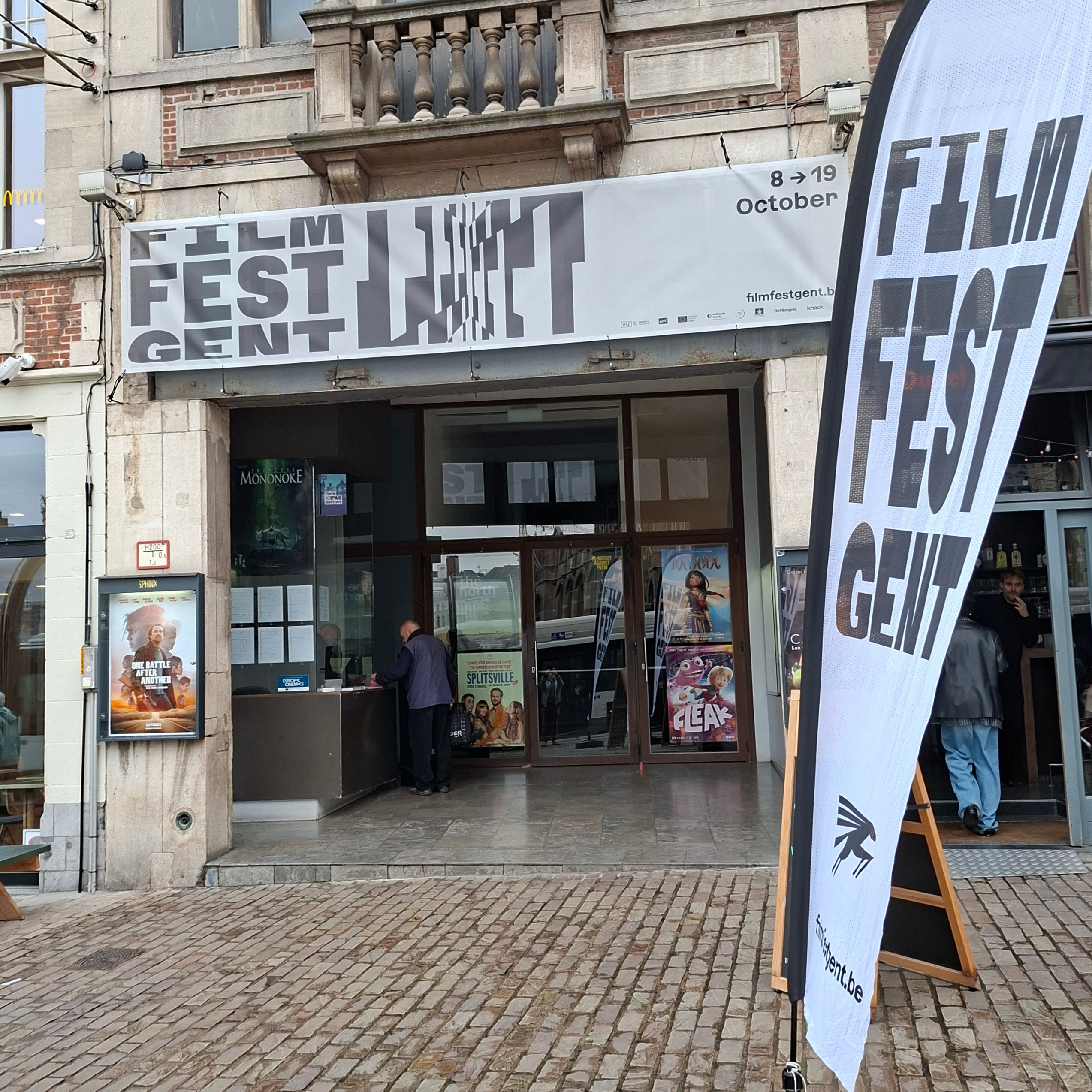
Cinema Sfinx entrance in 2024

For the 52nd edition of Film Fest Gent, the selection committee deliberately chose stories that focused on people, love and thoughtfulness. The tone was set right from the start with Julian, Cato Kusters’ compelling debut feature film, about two women who decide to get married in every country where that is legal. The theme of humanity was continued by the winner of the Grand Prix for Best Film: The Voice of Hind Rajab by Kaouther Ben Hania. This film confronted the audience with systematic international failure and served as a moral call to turn empathy into concrete action. Furthermore, Film Fest Gent signed the Film Workers for Palestine declaration. In addition, during the WSA Film Music Days, the festival presented the Industry Award to the Composers Diversity Collective. Founder Michael Abels expressed his heartfelt thanks to them on this occasion. The festival’s closing film and Harris Dickinson’s directorial debut, Urchin, also focused on social issues by exposing British homelessness policy. This year, the focus of the Classics programme was on the British filmmaker Nicolas Roeg (1928–2018). Classics curator Patrick Duynslaegher and guest of honour Theresa Russell, Roeg’s muse, took the audience on a journey through the radical visual language of the “Old Wizard” with screenings of, among others, The Witches (1990), Cold Heaven (1991), Fahrenheit 451 (1966) and The Man Who Fell to Earth (1976).

2025 marked the 25th edition of the World Soundtrack Awards. The quarter-century edition turned into a festive and moving tribute to the power of film music. Once again, a host of internationally renowned guests were in attendance, including Guests of Honour Debbie Wiseman and A.R. Rahman. Composers Philip Glass and Michael Nyman, two pioneers of minimalist film music, each received the Lifetime Achievement Award. Their works were performed live by the Brussels Philharmonic under the baton of Maestro Dirk Brossé in the dedicated concert ‘Minimalism in Motion’ during the Film Music Days. Volker Bertelmann won the Film Composer of the Year award for his music in Conclave and The Amateur. In addition to the various workshops and talks, the anniversary edition also saw the launch of the Screen Music Professionals Round Table – a new concept enabling composers and industry professionals to exchange ideas and experiences.

In April 2025, Film Fest Gent bid farewell to Ben ter Elst, the festival’s original founder and driving force.

== Awards ==
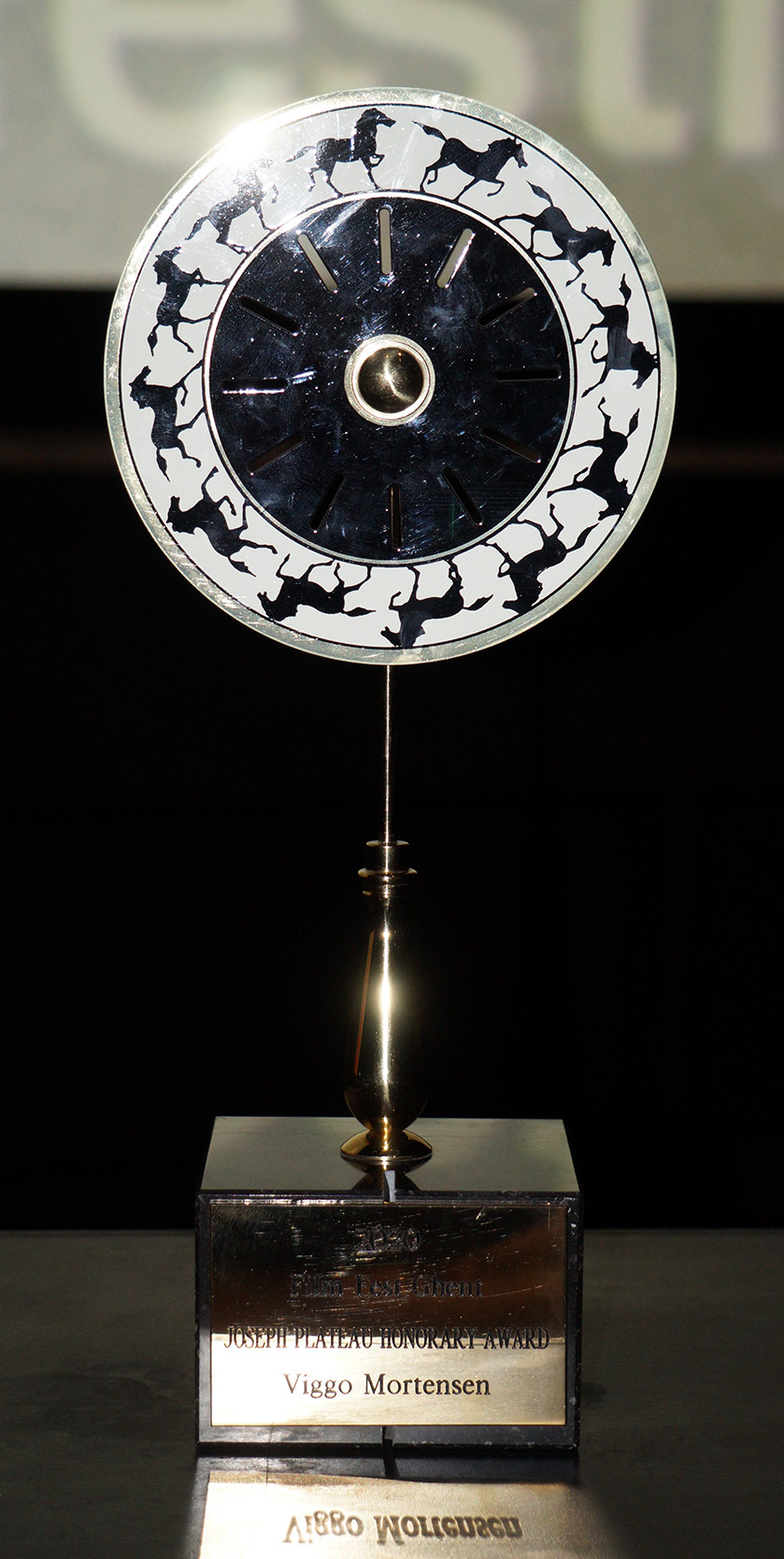
Honorary Plateau Award

Every year, numerous awards are handed out at Film Fest Ghent. An international jury assigns two main prizes: the Grand Prix for Best Film and the Georges Delerue Award for Best Soundtrack/Sound Design. The international short film jury awards the Best International Short and the Best Belgian Student Short. The Explore Award is handed out by a youth jury to a film in the Explore Zone programme. Furthermore, the organisation of Film Fest Ghent yearly offers a Joseph Plateau Honorary Award to someone who has had a great impact on the seventh art. The audience in Ghent also has a voice and decides who will take home the North Sea Port Public Choice Award. After a preselection by the Belgian TV channel Canvas, the public also decides who will take home the Canvas Audience Award. On top that, there is also a public prize for the short film that appeals the most to the audience of Ghent. Besides all the film-related prizes, there are of course the World Soundtrack Awards as well, the most important awards for film music.

=== Official Competition ===
The Grand Prix is awarded by an international jury and represents a distribution premium of and a media campaign worth .

The Georges Delerue Award honours the film with the best soundtrack or sound design. This prize is awarded by the same international jury to a film from the international competition. The prize includes a distribution premium and a media campaign worth.

Year	Grand Prix – Best Film	Director	Country	Georges Delerue Award – Best Music (Composer)	Director	Country	Jury
1985	Stop Making Sense	Jonathan Demme	United States	Détective (Jean-Luc Godard)	Jean-Luc Godard	France	André Delvaux, Michael White, Simon Heyworth, Alain Pierre, Loek Dikker
1986	My First Wife	Paul Cox	Australia	Crossroads (Ry Cooder)	Walter Hill	United States	Raoul Servais, Marc Didden, David Mansfield, Gerrard Verhage, Jurre Haanstra
1987	Night Zoo	Jean-Claude Lauzon	Canada	La vie est belle (Papa Wemba, Klody, Zaïko Langa Langa, Tshala Muana)	Mwezé Ngangura & Benoît Lamy	Zaire	Saul Chaplin, Samuel Fuller, Michael Kidd, Rolan Sergienko, Patrick Conrad
1988	Is-slottet	Per Blom	Norway	Sur (Astor Piazzolla)	Fernando E. Solanas	Argentina	Julius Epstein, Henri Colpi, Benoît Lamy, Trevor Jones, Jacques Poitrenaud
1989	Black Rain	Shohei Imamura	Japan	Black Rain (Toru Takemitsu)	Shohei Imamura	Japan	Mary Jane Walsh, Peer Raben, Stanley Myers, Erik van Zuylen, Pierre Drouot
1990	Freeze Die Come to Life	Vitali Kanevsky	Soviet Union	The Krays (Michael Kamen)	Peter Medak	United Kingdom	Fons Rademakers, Mike Figgis, Gilles Durieux, Jerry Leiber, Mike Stoller, Michel Khleifi
1991	Europa	Lars von Trier	Denmark	Cheb (Rachid Bouchareb)	Rachid Bouchareb	Algeria	Thérèse Liotard, Richard Griffiths, Jo Röpcke, Fred Roos, Luis Megino, Auguste Le Breton, Paul Bartel
1992	A Woman's Tale	Paul Cox	Australia	Bob Roberts (David Robbins)	Tim Robbins	United States	Nikolaus Glowna, Mrinal Sen, Louise Marleau, Milt Felsen, Alejandro Agresti, Allan Moyle, Aleksandr Askoldov, Gérard Corbiau
1993	Passion Fish	John Sayles	United States	The Puppetmaster (Hou Hsiao-Hsien)	Hou Hsiao-Hsien	Taiwan	Robert Wise, Jaime Humberto Hermosillo, Willeke van Ammelrooy, Philippe Sarde, Rudolph Thome, Hugo Claus
1994	La partie d'échecs	Yves Hanchar	Belgium	La partie d'échecs (Frédéric Devreese)	Yves Hanchar	Belgium	Robert Ellis Miller, Jan Van Raemdonck, Karl Malden, Renée Soutendijk, David Raskin, Krzysztof Zanussi, Paul Cox
1995	Cyclo	Tran Anh Hung	Vietnam	Cyclo (Tôn-Thất Tiết)	Tran Anh Hung	France	Elliott Gould, Leonard Rosenman, Gabrielle Claes, Derek de Lint, Yves Boisset
1996	Village of Dreams	Yōichi Higashi	Japan	Microcosmos (Bruno Coulais)	Claude Nuridsany & Marie Pérennou	France	Howard W. Koch, Terence Davies, Norma Heyman, Frédéric Devreese, Nicola Piovani, Frans Weisz
1997	The Witman Boys	János Szász	Hungary	Cavafy (Vangelis)	Yannis Smaragdis	Greece	Thom Hoffman, Giancarlo Esposito, Jean-Pierre De Decker, Gina Lollobrigida, Irvin Kershner
1998	Die Siebtelbauern	Stefan Ruzowitzky	Austria	Claire Dolan (Simon Fisher Turner)	Lodge Kerrigan	United States	Syd Field, Michael Haneke, Stijn Coninx, André Forcier, Christopher Hampton, Julia Ormond, Edward Shearman, Huub Stapel, Lawrence Turman
1999	Himalaya	Éric Valli	Nepal	Ratcatcher (Rachel Portman)	Lynne Ramsay	United Kingdom	Jay L. Cooper, Robert Forster, Christopher Lee, Marion Hänsel, Danièle Heymann, Amanda Plummer, Barrington Pheloung
2000	Amores Perros	Alejandro González Iñárritu	Mexico	Crouching Tiger, Hidden Dragon (Tan Dun)	Ang Lee	Taiwan	Mace Neufeld, Elia Cmíral, Christopher Hampton, Sally Hibbin, Bart Moeyaert, Molly Ringwald, Roland Verhavert, Henny Vrienten
2001	Atanarjuat: The Fast Runner	Zacharias Kunuk	Canada	Landscape (Vladimír Godár)	Martin Šulík	Slovakia	Pierre-Henri Deleau, Tom Barman, Maria Pia Fusco, Marie Laforêt, Barrington Pheloung, Dirk Roofthooft, Moufida Tlatli
2002	The Man Without a Past	Aki Kaurismäki	Finland	Spider (Howard Shore)	David Cronenberg	Canada	Gerard Mortier, Jocelyn Cammack, Eduardo Antin, Arthur Hamilton, Chris Lomme, Jeff Rona, Adriaan van Dis
2003	In America	Jim Sheridan	Ireland	Pornografia (Zygmunt Konieczny)	Jan Jakub Kolski	Poland	Jeanne Moreau, Ahmed Imamović, Gaston Kaboré, Daan Stuyven, Stephen Warbeck
2004	Nobody Knows	Hirokazu Koreeda	Japan	Machuca (Miguel Miranda & José Miguel Tobar)	Andrés Wood	Chile	Maurice Jarre, Stefan Arsenijević, Shekhar Kapur, John Matshikiza, Colm Meaney, Alain Platel, David Arnold
2005	The Three Burials of Melquiades Estrada	Tommy Lee Jones	United States	Proof (Stephen Warbeck)	John Madden	United States	Brenda Blethyn, Lissy Bellaiche, José Luis Castiñeira De Dios, Dominique Deruddere, Arthur Lappin, Carine Tardieu
2006	Ten Canoes	Rolf de Heer	Australia	Transylvania (Tony Gatlif)	Tony Gatlif	France	Michel Ciment, Jan Harlan, Jan Leyers, Cyril Morin, Miguel Pereira, Ken Wardrop
2007	Die Fälscher	Stefan Ruzowitzky	Austria	You, the Living (Benny Andersson)	Roy Andersson	Sweden	Kathleen Turner, Alex Heffes, Bálint Kenyeres, Maria Köpf, Adam Nordén
2008	Pazar: Bir Ticaret Masalı	Ben Hopkins	Turkey	Two-legged Horse (Tolib Shakhidi)	Samira Makhmalbaf	Iran	Vibeke Windeløv, Andreas Dresen, Simon Ellis, Corky Hale, Philippe Rombi, Arne Sierens
2009	Eyes Wide Open	Haim Tabakman	Israel	A Rational Solution (Nathan Larson)	Jörgen Bergmark	Sweden	Wang Quan'an, László Nemes, Filip Peeters, Niki Reiser
2010	Die Fremde	Feo Aladag	Germany	The Housemaid (Hong-jip Kim)	Im Sang-soo	South Korea	Wolfgang Kohlhaase, Goran Paskaljević, Jan Verheyen, Jean-Paul Wall, Els Dottermans, Ágnes Kocsis
2011	Elena	Andrey Zvyagintsev	Russia	The Invader (Evgueni & Sacha Galperine)	Nicolas Provost	Belgium	Jessica Woodworth, Nathan Larson, Marion Döring, Eran Riklis, Erik Poppe
2012	Tabu	Miguel Gomes	Portugal	Après mai (Olivier Assayas)	Olivier Assayas	France	Joan Dupont, Bavo Defurne, Bavo Dhooge, Xiaolu Guo, Abel Korzeniowski
2013	The Selfish Giant	Clio Barnard	United Kingdom	A Touch of Sin (Lim Giong)	Jia Zhangke	China	István Szabó, Fien Troch, John Parish, Gustavo Santaolalla, Denis Dercourt
2014	Gente de bien	Franco Lolli	Colombia	Violet (Boris Debackere)	Bas Devos	Belgium	Bret Easton Ellis, Héloïse Godet, Patrice Toye, Dana Linssen, Sergei Loznitsa
2015	Ixcanul	Jayro Bustamante	Guatemala	The Lobster (Johnnie Burn & Yorgos Lanthimos)	Yorgos Lanthimos	Ireland	Alan Parker, Marjane Satrapi, Caroline Strubbe, Franco Lolli, Boyd van Hoeij
2016	A Quiet Passion	Terence Davies	United Kingdom	Home (Johnny Jewel)	Fien Troch	Belgium	Jeremy Thomas, Jonathan Coe, Lina El Arabi, India Hair, Tran Anh Hung, Maaike Neuville
2017	Zagros	Sahim Omar Kalifa	Belgium	A Ciambra (Dan Romer)	Jonas Carpignano	Italy	Aurelio Grimaldi, Greta Scacchi, Eytan Fox, Juliane Lorenz, Arnaud Valois, Gust Van den Berghe
2018	Cold War	Pawel Pawlikowski	Poland	High Life (Stuart A. Staples)	Claire Denis	France	Michaël Borremans, Soulwax, Hope Dickson Leach, Mireille Perrier, Alexandre O. Philippe, João Pedro Rodrigues, Nele Wohlatz
2019	Öndög	Wang Quan'an	Mongolia	Monos (Mica Levi & Lena Esquenazi)	Alejandro Landes	Colombia	Joachim Lafosse, Radu Jude, Midge Costin, Guy Lodge, Fiorella Moretti, Dora Bouchoucha
2020	Petite fille	Sébastien Lifshitz	France	Servants (Ivan Ostrochovský)	Ivan Ostrochovský	Slovakia	Fabrice Du Welz, Benh Zeitlin, Damien Manivel, Natali Broods, Dascha Dauenhauer
2021	Vortex	Gaspar Noé	France	Clara Sola (Ruben De Gheselle)	Nathalie Álvarez Mesén	Costa Rica	Doreen Boonekamp, Hlynur Pálmason, Florencia Di Concilio, Lucas Belvaux
2022	Saint Omer	Alice Diop	France	Drii Winter (Tobias Koch & Jannik Giger)	Michael Koch	Germany	Clio Barnard, Welket Bungué, Daniel Hart, Alexandre Koberidze, Nathalie Álvarez Mesén, Nico Leunen
2023	Los delincuentes	Rodrigo Moreno	Argentina	Poor Things (Jerskin Fendrix)	Yorgos Lanthimos	Ireland	Sébastien Lifshitz, Colin Stetson, Lukas Dhont, Jacqueline Lentzou, Juanita Onzaga, Anne Dorval, Jessica Kiang
2024	Super Happy Forever	Kohei Igarashi	Japan	Grand Tour (Miguel Gomes)	Miguel Gomes	Portugal	Robbie Ryan, Bas Devos, Lu Huang, Marija Kavtaradze, Valentina Maurel, Rodrigo Moreno
2025	The Voice of Hind Rajab	Kaouther Ben Hania	Tunisia	Barrio Triste (Arca)	Stillz	Colombia	Theresa Russell, Charlotte Adigéry, Ramon Zürcher, Maxime Jean-Baptiste, Alain Dessauvage, Denise Fernandes
2026	La Gradiva	Marine Atlan	France	Dao (2026 film) (Alain Gomis)	Alain Gomis	France	Felix van Groeningen, Lous and the Yakuza, Jaume Claret Muxart, Sandra Den Hamer, Nicole Vögele

=== Joseph Plateau Honorary Award ===
The Joseph Plateau Honorary Award is presented to distinguished guests of Film Fest Ghent whose achievements have earned them a special and distinct place in the history of international filmmaking. The award itself is a replica of professor Joseph Plateau’s Phenakistiscope, the device he designed to illustrate his theory of the persistence of vision, which became the basic principle behind the idea of “moving images”.

Year	Winner	Function	Country
1991	Michel Legrand	Composer	France
1991	André Delvaux	Director	Belgium
1992	Carl Davis	Composer	United States
1992	Alain Cuny	Actor	France
1993	Philippe Sarde	Composer	France
1993	Robert Altman	Director	United States
1994	Jean-Claude Petit	Composer	France
1994	John Hurt	Actor	United Kingdom
1994	Henri Storck	Director	Belgium
1995	Gabrielle Claes	Conservator Royal Belgian Film Archive	Belgium
1995	James Earl Jones	Actor	United States
1997	Sir David Puttnam	Producer	United Kingdom
1997	Sydney Pollack	Director	United States
1997	Gina Lollobrigida	Actress	Italy
1998	Alain Resnais	Director	France
1998	Shohei Imamura	Director	Japan
1998	Sir Peter Ustinov	Actor	United Kingdom
1998	Elmer Bernstein	Composer	United States
1998	Robert Wise	Director	United States
1999	Bonnie Arnold	Producer	United States
1999	Peter Greenaway	Director	United Kingdom
1999	Irwin Winkler	Producer	United States
1999	Sandra Bullock	Actress	United States
1999	Stanley Donen	Director	United States
2000	Hans Zimmer	Composer	Germany
2000	Morgan Freeman	Actor	United States
2001	Roger Corman	Director	United States
2001	Richard & Lili Fini Zanuck	Producers	United States
2001	Roy E. Disney	Vice chairman Walt Disney Company	United States
2001	Bertrand Tavernier	Director	France
2001	Gabriel Yared	Composer	France
2002	Blair Underwood	Actor	United States
2002	Roland Verhavert	Director	Belgium
2002	Jan Van Raemdonck	Producer	Belgium
2002	Hanna Schygulla	Actress	Germany
2002	Jean Reno	Actor	France
2002	Juliette Binoche	Actress	France
2002	Jeanne Moreau	Actress	France
2003	Toni Curtis	Actor	United States
2004	Lord Richard Attenborough	Director and Actor	United Kingdom
2005	Nand Buyl	Actor	Belgium
2005	Zbigniew Preisner	Composer	Poland
2005	Alan Ladd Jr	Producer	United States
2005	Mike Leigh	Director	United Kingdom
2006	Agnes Varda	Director	France
2007	Walter Hill	Director	United States
2007	Danny Glover	Actor	United States
2007	Kathleen Turner	Actress	United States
2008	Walter Parkes & Laurie MacDonald	Producers	United States
2008	Richard Jenkins	Actor	United States
2008	Woody Harrelson	Actor	United States
2009	Andy Garcia	Actor and Director	United States
2009	Claude Miller	Director	France
2009	Kevin Costner	Actor and Director	United States
2009	Dirk Brossé	Composer	Belgium
2010	Paul Greengrass	Director	United Kingdom
2010	Catherine Deneuve	Actress	France
2011	Chris Lomme	Actress	Belgium
2011	Luc & Jean-Pierre Dardenne	Directors	Belgium
2011	Norman Jewison	Director	United States
2011	Isabelle Huppert	Actress	France
2012	Emmanuelle Riva	Actress	France
2012	Paolo & Vittorio Taviani	Directors	Italy
2013	Jacques Dubrulle	Former Festival Director	Belgium
2013	István Szabó	Director	Hungary
2013	Paul Schrader	Director	United States
2015	Christopher Plummer	Actor	Canada
2015	Sir Alan Parker	Director	United Kingdom
2016	Jeremy Thomas	Producer	United Kingdom
2016	Ken Loach	Director	United Kingdom
2017	Greta Scacchi	Actress	Italy
2017	Johan Leysen	Actor	Belgium
2017	Pierre Drouot	Producer	Belgium
2018	Dirk Impens	Producer	Belgium
2019	Agustí Villaronga	Director	Spain
2019	Géraldine Chaplin	Actress	United States
2020	Viggo Mortensen	Actor and Director	United StatesDenmark
2021	Harry Kümel	Director	Belgium
2021	Andrea Arnold	Director	United Kingdom
2022	Raoul Servais	Director	Belgium
2022	Céline Sciamma	Director	France
2023	Ryûsuke Hamaguchi	Director	Japan
2023	Terence Davies Posthumous	Director	United Kingdom
2024	Emily Watson	Actress	United Kingdom
2024	Michel Khleifi	Director	Palestine
2025	Theresa Russell	Actor	United States
