= The Man Who Had His Hair Cut Short (film) =

- Theatrical release poster
- Directed by: André Delvaux
- Screenplay by: Anna De Pagter; André Delvaux
- Based on: The Man Who Had His Hair Cut Short by Johan Daisne
- Produced by: Paul Louyet; Jos Op De Beeck
- Cinematography: Ghislain Cloquet; Roland Delcour
- Edited by: Suzanne Baron; R. Delferrière
- Music by: Frédéric Devreese
- Release date: 5 September 1966
- Running time: 94 minutes
- Country: Belgium
- Language: Dutch

The Man Who Had His Hair Cut Short (Dutch: De man die zijn haar kort liet knippen) is a 1966 Belgian drama film directed by André Delvaux, starring Senne Rouffaer and Beata Tyszkiewicz. It tells the story of a schoolteacher who falls in love with one of his students, and moves away in order to escape his infatuation. The film is based on the 1947 novel with the same title by Johan Daisne.

The film was awarded the Sutherland Trophy at the 1966 BFI London Film Festival.

== Plot ==
Govert Miereveld, a married man with two children who is working as a teacher in a secondary school, attends the end-of-year awards. Infatuated with Fran Veerman, one of his pupils who in addition to intellect and beauty is a talented singer, he does not manage to declare his love but does ask another girl to give Fran his parting present of a valuable old book. She leaves school and he falls into depression, moving his family to another town and taking a job there as court clerk. Asked to attend the on-site autopsy of a decomposed corpse found in the river, he is profoundly shocked at what happens to the human body.

Afterwards, booking into a hotel, he is amazed to see Fran descending the stairs. She is giving a concert in the town that evening and, when late at night he knocks gently at her door, she lets him in and lets his feelings pour out. Once he has explained how she has been the meaning of his life, she replies that she had loved him too. She goes on to warn him that she is no goddess but had already had an affair before joining his class and has had many men since. Then she shows him her three treasures: a gift from her first lover, the book Govert gave her, and the pistol with which she killed her abusive father (who, Govert realises, was probably the corpse in the river). She begs Govert, if he truly loves her, to end her unhappy life and he fires the pistol.

Later, in a psychiatric institution, he learns by accident that Fran was not killed by his shot. He finally realises that he must abandon his obsession with her and must devote himself to his faithful wife and children.

== Cast ==
- Senne Rouffaer as Govert Miereveld
- Beata Tyszkiewicz as Eufrazia 'Fran' Veerman
- Hector Camerlynck as Prof. Mato
- Hilde Uitterlinden as Beps
- Annemarie Van Dijk as Corra
- Hilda Van Roose as Teacher Freken
- François Beukelaers as Patient
- Arlette Emmery as One of the Seven
- Paul S'Jongers as Assistant of Prof. Mato
- Luc Philips as City Councillor
- François Bernard as Judge Brantink
- Vic Moeremans as Director
- Maurits Goossens as Principal
