= André Delvaux =

Belgian film director

- Born: André Albert Auguste Delvaux; 21 March 1926; Heverlee, Belgium
- Died: 4 October 2002 (aged 76); Valencia, Spain
- Occupation: Film director

André Albert Auguste Delvaux (French: [dɛlvo]; 21 March 1926 – 4 October 2002) was a Belgian film director. He co-founded the film school INSAS in 1962 and is regarded as the founder of the Belgian national cinema. Adapting works by writers such as Johan Daisne, Julien Gracq and Marguerite Yourcenar, he received international attention for directing magic realist films.

Delvaux received the Louis Delluc Prize for Rendezvous at Bray (1971) and the André Cavens Award for Woman Between Wolf and Dog (1979) and The Abyss (1988). The king of Belgium made him a baron in 1996. The Académie André Delvaux is named after him and he posthumously received the first Honorary Magritte Award in 2011.

== Early life and education ==
André Albert Auguste Delvaux was born in Heverlee, Belgium, on 21 March 1926. He studied piano at the Royal Conservatory of Brussels and worked as a silent film pianist at the Belgian cinématheque in his early 20s. He studied law and took a degree in German philology at the Free University of Brussels, after which he worked as a teacher.

== Filmmaking career ==
Delvaux's filmmaking career started in 1954 when he began to make television documentaries about film directors for the broadcaster RTB. Notably, he made a four-part series about Federico Fellini in 1960. In 1959 he co-directed a short fiction film with Jean Brismée, La Planète fauve. In 1962 he co-founded the film school INSAS in Brussels and became the director of its directing department. From that point cinema was his primary occupation.

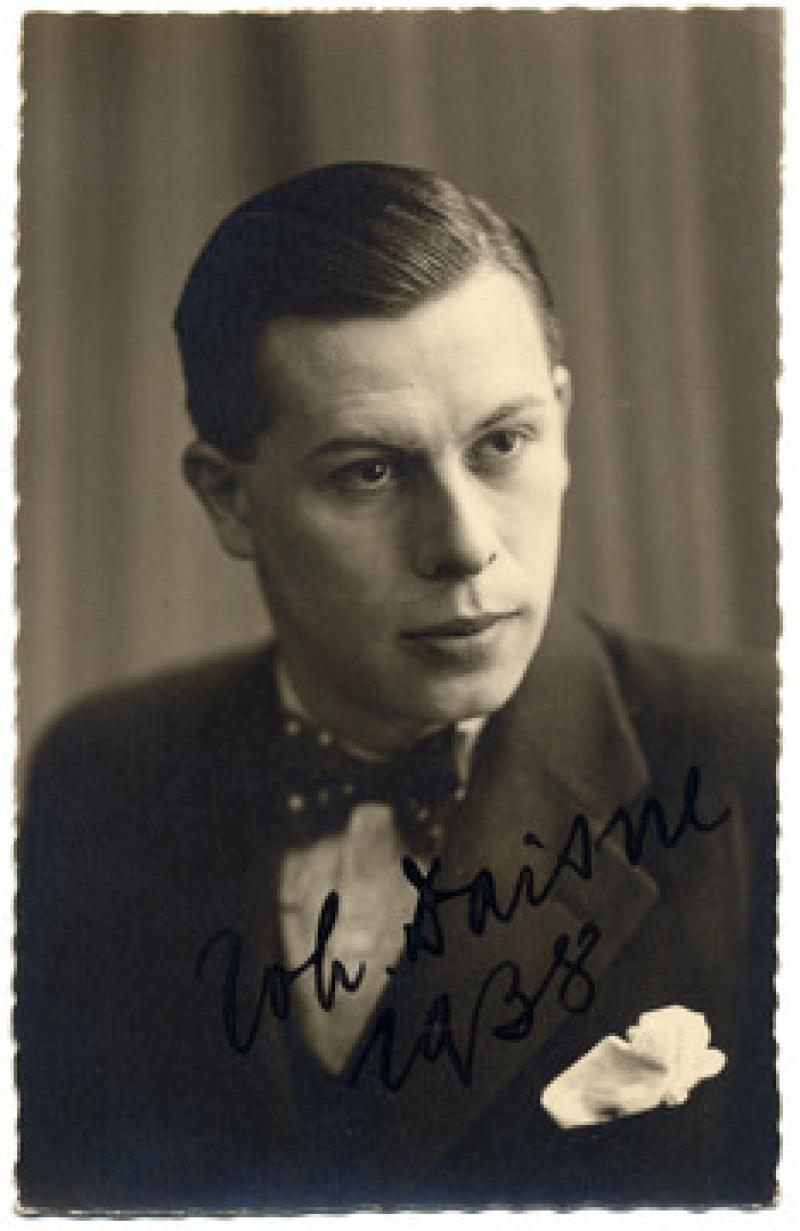
Delvaux's first two feature films were based on books by Johan Daisne.

Delvaux received international attention for his first feature film, The Man Who Had His Hair Cut Short (1965), which is based on Johan Daisne's novel with the same title. It was followed by another Daisne adaptation, One Night... A Train, in 1968. His first colour film, it shares several elements with the previous film: an uncomfortable teacher, a tragic ending and a confrontation between love and death. Rendezvous at Bray (1971), loosely based Julien Gracq's novella King Cophetua, is set during World War I and places great emphasis on atmosphere. The film stars Mathieu Carrière, Roger Van Hool, Bulle Ogier and Anna Karina, and became a turning point in Delvaux's career, because its critical success allowed him to choose his subjects more freely.

Belle (1973) is about an affair with a mistress who may or may not be imaginary. Woman Between Wolf and Dog (1979), set in German-occupied Flanders during World War II, is among Delvaux's more realist films. It is about a woman who is torn between the Belgian Resistance and her collaborationist husband. The painterly Benvenuta (1983), based on Suzanne Lilar's book La Confession anonyme, plays with reality and imagination through a story about a screenwriter who adapts a novel for film. Delvaux's last feature film was his largest project, The Abyss (1988). The film is an episodic drama set in 16th-century Europe and based on a book by Marguerite Yourcenar. Like Belle and Woman Between Wolf and Dog before it, The Abyss played in the main competition of the Cannes Film Festival. Delvaux's final short film, 1001 films, was shown as a special screening at the 1989 Cannes Film Festival.

== Cinematic style ==
From the release of The Man Who Had His Hair Cut Short, Delvaux was associated with magic realism and known for his portrayals of dreams and reality. Aligning himself with a tradition that involved painters such as Hieronymus Bosch, René Magritte and Paul Delvaux, he proclaimed and expressed a "belgitude" connected to magic realism. Delvaux's assertion of a distinctive Belgian identity, separate from French cinema, gave him status as the founder of the country's national film industry. The visuals in some of his films have tendencies of surrealism, which is distinct from the deliberately constructed magic realism by being based on Freudian fetishism and automatism. In his application of these tendencies, Delvaux was closer to Magritte and Gracq than to André Breton or Luis Buñuel. Two important collaborators were the cinematographer Ghislain Cloquet, who worked on Delvaux's first four feature films, and the composer Frédéric Devreese, who provided original music throughout his career.

== Personal life ==
Delvaux died from a heart attack on 4 October 2002, while he was in Valencia to speak at the World Arts Meeting. His daughter Catherine Delvaux has been engaged in making his films available on home media.

== Selected filmography ==
- 1959: La Planète fauve
- 1960: Fellini
- 1965: The Man Who Had His Hair Cut Short (De man die zijn haar kort liet knippe)
- 1968: One Night... A Train (Un soir, un train)
- 1971: Rendezvous at Bray (Rendez-vous à Bray)
- 1973: Belle
- 1979: Woman Between Wolf and Dog (Een vrouw tussen hond en wolf)
- 1983: Benvenuta
- 1985: Babel Opéra
- 1988: The Abyss (L'Œuvre au noir)
- 1989: 1001 films

== Awards and honours ==
The Man Who Had His Hair Cut Short received the British Film Institute's Sutherland Trophy in 1966 for being "the most original and imaginative film premiered at the National Film Theatre during the year". Rendezvous at Bray was awarded the Louis Delluc Prize in 1971. The Belgian Film Critics Association gave Delvaux its André Cavens Award for Belgian film of the year twice, for Woman Between Wolf and Dog and The Abyss.

Delvaux received the Plateau Life Achievement Award at the 1991 Film Fest Ghent. In 1996 he was knighted by King Albert II of Belgium and given the personal title of baron. He was made an honorary doctor by the Université libre de Bruxelles and received the Order of the Crown of the Officer class. The Académie André Delvaux is named after him and was created in 2010 with his daughter's involvement. It works to promote French-language Belgian cinema and is responsible for the Magritte Awards. Delvaux received a posthumous Honorary Magritte Award at the 1st Magritte Awards in 2011.
