= Gabrielle Claes =

Belgian conservator

Gabrielle Claes was the director of the film archive, Cinémathèque royale de Belgique. She is known for her work in the preservation of films on reels.

== Career ==
Gabrielle Claes was the conservator of the Cinémathèque royale de Belgique, also known as Cinematek, from 1988 to 2011. She is known for her work in the preservation of original films on reels, rather than on videotapes or digital copies, and for her work distributing old films. She has spoken with cinergie.be, a website focused on Belgian film, multiple times including a 1990 interview on her new challenges as curator of Cinematek, and discussions about the items in the archive. In 1994, the film director Eric de Kuyper talked about her comments on the international nature of film archives means they are not reflecting the regional aspect of a given archive.

In 2001 the archive experienced financial troubles as Claes discussed in articles in the media, and there was a proposal to use funds from the lottery to support the archive. She was able to enlist the support of filmmakers such as Martin Scorsese to make statements in support of the archive. In 2007 she talked about the possibility of preserving films in digital format with Le Temps newspaper.

Claes was on the executive committee of the International Federation of Film Archives from 1995 until 1999. She was one of the founders of the Association of European Film Archives and Cinematheques (ACE). She served as president and treasurer of ACE, and was the first person to hold the position of president.

Gabrielle Claes made an appearance in "All Night Long" ("Toute une nuit") by Chantal Akerman (1982). She is also in the film Exprmntl about the film festival of the same name that was organized by Cinematek; the film was shown in 2019 at the London Short Film Festival.

== Selected publications ==
- Claes, Gabrielle (2001). "Managing a collection- issues of selection and transmission" (PDF). Danish Film Institute. Preserve Then Show.
  - reviewed in The Moving Image: The Journal of the Association of Moving Image Archivists
- Claes, Gabrielle (2009). "Musée du cinéma / Cinematek". Journal of Film Preservation (79/80): 26–30.
- Claes, Gabrielle; Martens, Erik (2009). "La Cinémathèque numérise". Journal of Film Preservation (79/80): 102.

== Awards and honors ==
In 1995 she won the Joseph Plateau Award for "guests of Film Fest Ghent whose achievements have earned them a special and distinct place in the history of international film making". She also served on the 1995 jury for the Grand Prix for Best Film of the Film Fest Ghent. In 2011, the Flemish Film Awards awarded her with Prijs van de Verdienste, a merit award, in recognition of her work with the Cinematek film archive.
