= Honorary Magritte Award =

Annual award given by the Académie André Delvaux

- Awarded for: Exceptional contributions to the state of motion picture arts and sciences
- Country: Belgium
- Presented by: Académie André Delvaux
- First award: 2011
- Website: lesmagritteducinema.com

The Honorary Magritte Award (French: Magritte d'honneur) is presented annually by the board of the Académie André Delvaux as part of the Magritte Awards. It honors individuals for their exceptional career achievements, significant contributions to the film industry, and outstanding service to Belgian and international cinema.

Unlike the other Magritte Awards, which are determined by a secret vote of the academy's members, the recipient of the Honorary Magritte Award is chosen directly by the academy's board. It is not subject to the eligibility requirements or deadlines that apply to other categories and recognizes accomplishments in cinema that do not fit within the existing award categories.

== Recipients ==
Years listed for the Honorary Magritte Award recipients correspond to the year of the awarded films, with the corresponding edition of the Magritte Awards provided in parentheses below, following this information for recipients listed in the Official Magritte Awards Database and Web-based official documents.

=== 2010s ===
Year	Recipient	Branch	Nationality
2010 (1st)	André Delvaux	Director	Belgium
2011 (2nd)	Nathalie Baye	Actor	France
2012 (3rd)	Costa-Gavras	Director	Greece / France
2013 (4th)	Emir Kusturica	Director	Serbia
2014 (5th)	Pierre Richard	Actor	France
2015 (6th)	Vincent Lindon	Actor	France
2016 (7th)	André Dussollier	Actor	France
2017 (8th)	Sandrine Bonnaire	Actor	France
2018 (9th)	Raoul Servais	Animator	Belgium
2019 (10th)	Monica Bellucci	Actor	Italy

=== 2020s ===
Year	Recipient	Branch	Nationality
2020/21 (11th)	Marion Hänsel	Director	Belgium
2022 (12th)	Agnès Jaoui	Screenwriter	France
2023 (13th)	Aurore Clément	Actor	France
2024 (14th)	Gilles Lellouche	Actor	France
