= Super Happy Forever =

2024 drama film

- Directed by: Kohei Igarashi
- Written by: Kohei Igarashi; Koichi Kubodera
- Starring: Hiroki Sano; Yoshinori Miyata; Nairu Yamamoto; Hoàng Nhu Quýnh
- Cinematography: Wataru Takahashi
- Edited by: Keiko Okawa; Kohei Igarashi; Damien Manivel
- Music by: Daigo Sakuragi
- Release date: 28 August 2024 (Venice)
- Countries: France; Japan
- Language: Japanese

Super Happy Forever is a 2024 French-Japanese drama film co-written and directed by Kohei Igarashi. The film premiered at the 81st edition of the Venice Film Festival in the Giornate degli Autori sidebar. It won the Grand Prix for Best Film at the 2024 Film Fest Gent and the Golden Puffin at the Reykjavík International Film Festival.

== Plot ==
The film opens in 2023 with longtime friends Sano and Miyata visiting a resort hotel at Atami on the Izu Peninsula in the final days before it closes down. Sano is mourning the very recent death of his wife Nagi, and his behaviour strains the relationship with Miyata, until Miyata leaves.

The film then slips back in time to 2018, exactly five years earlier, when we see Nagi in the same room as the boys will occupy in the future. She was supposed to be travelling with a friend, but has been let down. She falls in with Sano and Miyata who are also at the hotel. The three of them explore the town. Later Sano and Nagi go clubbing together and wander through the evening chatting. They arrange to meet again the following morning before returning home. Next morning, Nagi forgets the rendezvous, but Sano finds her after they have both checked out of the hotel.

Back in 2023, the hotel is finally closed down and the staff move on. Apart from the three protagonists, a number of significant elements link the two timelines: a red baseball cap; a Vietnamese chambermaid (Anh); and the Bobby Darin song, Beyond the Sea. The final scene makes the connection explicit.

== Main cast ==
- Hiroki Sano as Sano
- Yoshinori Miyata as Miyata
- Nairu Yamamoto as Nagi
- Hoàng Nhu Quýnh as Anh

== Reception ==
Reviewing for The Guardian, Cath Clarke described Super Happy Forever as a "gentle, straightforward drama, beautifully acted and emotionally tuned in", awarding it four stars out of five.
