= The Abyss (1988 film) =

1988 film

- Film poster
- Directed by: André Delvaux
- Written by: André Delvaux; Marguerite Yourcenar
- Produced by: Jean-Claude Batz; Philippe Dussart
- Starring: Gian Maria Volonté
- Cinematography: Charles Van Damme
- Edited by: Albert Jurgenson
- Music by: Frédéric Devreese
- Release date: 13 May 1988
- Running time: 110 minutes
- Countries: France; Belgium
- Language: French

The Abyss (French: L'Œuvre au noir) is a 1988 drama film directed by André Delvaux. It was entered into the 1988 Cannes Film Festival. It is based on the novel of the same name by Marguerite Yourcenar. The film received the André Cavens Award for Best Film by the Belgian Film Critics Association (UCC).

== Background ==
In the 16th century, the Duke of Alba crushed the rebellion of Flanders against Spain. The strict Catholic King Philip II of Spain (1556-1598), restricted religious freedom and applied the decrees of the Council of Trent which strengthened the power of the Inquisition in Flanders. During this turbulent period, the venerable writer and philosopher Zénon Ligre arrived in Bruges.

== Plot ==
The doctor and alchemist Zénon Ligre returns to his country of origin Flanders using false documentation, after spending his life traveling around Europe. In his hometown of Bruges, he finds work as a doctor in the convent of the Cordeliers. After founding a clinic and spa, he sets out to work as a doctor and alchemist for the poor. Zénon‘s ideology and methods were very popular among the Flemish population, but they ran the risk of being condemned by the Inquisition because they deviated from official orthodoxy. Having engaged in bisexual relations for several years, Zénon is accused of having homosexual relations with a young friar. Long sought after by authorities for his subversive writings, Zénon is arrested. He is tried by a court of the Inquisition and accused of witchcraft, murder, and unnatural relations. Rather than be burned at the stake, he prefers to choose his own death.

== Cast ==
- Gian Maria Volonté as Zénon
- Sami Frey as Prieur des Cordeliers
- Jacques Lippe as Myers
- Anna Karina as Catherine
- Philippe Léotard as Henri-Maximilien
- Jean Bouise as Campanus
- Marie-Christine Barrault as Hilzonde
- Marie-France Pisier as Martha
- Mathieu Carrière as Pierre de Hamaere
- Pierre Dherte as Cyprien
- Johan Leysen as Rombaut
- Dora van der Groen as Greete
- Senne Rouffaer as Le Cocq
- Geert Desmet as Han
- Michel Poncelet as Josse
