= The Cruel Embrace =

1987 Belgian film by Marion Hänsel

- Theatrical release poster
- Directed by: Marion Hänsel
- Written by: Marion Hänsel
- Starring: Marianne Basler
- Cinematography: Walther Vanden Ende
- Music by: Frédéric Devreese
- Release date: 25 November 1987
- Running time: 99 minutes
- Countries: Belgium; France
- Language: French

The Cruel Embrace (French: Les Noces barbares) is a 1987 drama film directed by Marion Hänsel. The film was selected as the Belgian entry for the Best Foreign Language Film at the 60th Academy Awards, but was not accepted as a nominee.

== Cast ==
- Marianne Basler as Nicole, la mere
- Thierry Frémont as Ludo adolescent
- Yves Cotton as Ludo enfant
- Marie-Ange Dutheil as Mademoisell Rakoff
- André Penvern as Micho
- Frédéric Saurel as Tatar
- Claudine Delvaux as Madame Blanchard
- Jacky Pratoussy as Monsieur Blanchard

== See also ==
- List of submissions to the 60th Academy Awards for Best Foreign Language Film
- List of Belgian submissions for the Academy Award for Best Foreign Language Film
