= The Man Who Had His Hair Cut Short =

1947 novel by Johan Daisne

- First US edition (1965)
- Author: Johan Daisne
- Original title: De man die zijn haar kort liet knippen
- Translator: S. J. Sackett
- Publisher: Manteau
- Publication date: 1947
- English publication date: 1965 (Horizon Press)
- Pages: 281

The Man Who Had His Hair Cut Short (Dutch: De man die zijn haar kort liet knippen) is a 1947 novel by the Flemish writer Johan Daisne. It tells the story of a teacher at a girls' school who falls in love with one of his students; he moves from the town to Brussels and changes profession in order to avoid her, and slowly begins to grow insane. The novel was published in English in 1965, translated by S. J. Sackett. It was adapted into a 1966 film with the same title directed by André Delvaux.
