= Roger Coggio =

French actor

- Born: 11 March 1934; Lyon, France
- Died: 22 October 2001 (aged 67); Seine-Saint-Denis, France
- Occupations: Actor; Film director Screenwriter
- Years active: 1954–1998

Roger Coggio (11 March 1934 – 22 October 2001) was a French actor, film director and screenwriter. He appeared in 40 films between 1954 and 1998. He was married to actress Pascale Audret. He died of cancer.

== Selected filmography ==
- Before the Deluge (1954)
- Fruits of Summer (1955)
- Forgive Us Our Trespasses (1956)
- Girl on the Road (1962)
- The Immortal Story (1968)
- Belle (1973)
- La dernière bourrée à Paris (1973)
- C'est encore loin l'Amérique ? (1980)
- Le bourgeois gentilhomme (1981)
- Monsieur de Pourceaugnac (1985)
