= Belle (1973 film) =

1973 film

- Theatrical release poster
- Directed by: André Delvaux
- Written by: André Delvaux; Monique Rysselinck
- Produced by: Jean-Claude Batz; Albina du Boisrouvray
- Starring: Jean-Luc Bideau
- Cinematography: Ghislain Cloquet; Charles Van Damme
- Edited by: Emmanuelle Dupuis; Pierre Joassin
- Music by: Frédéric Devreese
- Release date: 1973
- Running time: 96 minutes
- Countries: Belgium; France
- Language: French

Belle is a 1973 Belgian-French drama film directed by André Delvaux. It was entered into the 1973 Cannes Film Festival.

== Plot ==
The aging romancer Mathieu Grégoire falls in love with a female stranger who doesn't even understand his language. Their uncommon relationship upsets his family.

== Cast ==
- Jean-Luc Bideau as Mathieu Grégoire
- Danièle Delorme as Jeanne
- Adriana Bogdan as Belle
- Roger Coggio as Victor
- René Hainaux as the deputy
- Stéphane Excoffier as Marie
- John Dobrynine as John
- Valerio Popesco as the stranger
- François Beukelaers as the false stranger
- André Blavier as Vincent
- Marc Audier as the café owner
- Arlette Emmery as the presenter
- Suzanne Gohy as the mother
- Yvette Merlin as the boss at the 'Joités'
