= Guy Cavagnac =

French filmmaker (1934–2022)

- Born: 15 September 1934; Paris, France
- Died: 7 January 2022 (aged 87)
- Occupation: Filmmaker

Guy Cavagnac (15 September 1934 – 7 January 2022) was a French independent filmmaker.

== Life and career ==
After his studies at the Institut des hautes études cinématographiques, Cavagnac shot several commissioned short films and served as an assistant to Jean Renoir. In 1970, he founded the production enterprise Unité 3 alongside Paul Vecchiali and Liliane de Kermadec. That year, he released Le Soldat Laforêt, presented at the Rencontres du Jeune Cinéma in Bourges in 1971. From 1982 to 1989, he directed the A.C.S. Ateliers cinématographiques Sirventès.

Cavagnac died on 7 January 2022, at the age of 87.

== Filmography ==
=== Director ===
- Le Soldat Laforêt (1970)

=== Producer ===
- Le Soldat Laforêt (1970)
- L'Étrangleur (1972)
- Home Sweet Home (1972)
- Aloïse (1975)
- Jeanne Dielman, 23 quai du Commerce, 1080 Bruxelles (1975)
- L'Âne qui a bu la lune (1988)
- La Campagne de Cicéron (1990)

=== Assistant director ===
- Les Ruses du diable (1966)
- The Cop (1970)
- Femmes Femmes (1974)

== Publications ==
- Villefranche-de-Rouergue : Histoire et génie du lieu (1991)
- Jean Renoir : Le Désir du monde (1994)
- Baroque occitan (1996)
- Une partie de campagne : Eli Lotar, photographies du tournage (2007)
