= One Night... A Train =

- Theatrical release poster
- Directed by: André Delvaux
- Screenplay by: André Delvaux
- Based on: De trein der traagheid by Johan Daisne
- Produced by: Mag Bodard
- Cinematography: Ghislain Cloquet
- Edited by: Suzanne Baron
- Music by: Frédéric Devreese
- Release date: 1968
- Running time: 86 minutes
- Countries: Belgium; France
- Languages: Dutch; French

One Night... A Train (French: Un soir, un train) is a 1968 Belgian-French drama film directed by André Delvaux, starring Yves Montand and Anouk Aimée. It tells the story of Mathias, a professor of linguistics at a university where the students have lively discussions about Flemish nationalism and morality. During a train ride, the French-speaking woman who Mathias lives with disappears and he goes looking for her in an unknown city. The film is based on the 1950 novel De trein der traagheid by Johan Daisne.

== Cast ==
- Yves Montand as Mathias
- Anouk Aimée as Anne
- Adriana Bogdan as Moira
- Hector Camerlynck as Hernhutter
- François Beukelaers as Val
- Michael Gough as Jeremiah
- Senne Rouffaer as Elckerlyc
- Domien De Gruyter as Werner
- Jan Peré as Henrik

== Reception ==
Aurélien Ferenczi of Télérama wrote in 2009: "The cleverness of the film is how it finds unusual visual equivalents to classic themes of 60s auteur cinema—at the heart, we are very close to Antonioni. Yves Montand and Anouk Aimée are terrific, and One Night... A Train is perhaps, quite simply, its director's best film."

=== Box office ===
According to Fox records the film required $1,650,000 in rentals to break even and by 11 December 1970 had made only $525,000, so made a loss for the studio.
