= Jean-Henri Meunier =

French film director, screenwriter and actor (1949–2024)

- Born: 2 November 1949; Oullins, France
- Died: 11 September 2024 (aged 74); Najac, France
- Occupations: Film director Screenwriter; Actor

Jean-Henri Meunier (2 November 1949 – 11 September 2024) was a French film director, screenwriter, and actor. He presented the film Faut savoir se contenter de beaucoup to the Festival International du Film Grolandais de Toulouse, which covered far-left terrorists Jean-Marc Rouillan and Noël Godin. Meunier died on 11 September 2024, at the age of 74.

== Filmography ==
=== As director ===
- L'Adieu nu (1977)
- Aurais dû faire gaffe, le choc est terrible (1977)
- La Bande du Rex (1979)
- As Life Goes By (2004)
- Najac Calling Over to You, Earth (2006)
- Y'a pire ailleurs (2012)

=== As screenwriter ===
- L'Adieu nu (1977)
- Aurais dû faire gaffe, le choc est terrible (1977)
- La Bande du Rex (1979)

=== As actor ===
- La Bande du Rex (1979)

== Publication ==
- Empreintes : la terre vue d'en bas & des oreilles (2012)
