= Jo Röpcke =

Belgian television presenter, film critic and film journalist (1928–2007)

- Born: 4 October 1928; Ghent, Belgium
- Died: 25 May 2007 (aged 78); Cannes, France
- Occupations: Television host, film journalist, director and critic

Jo Röpcke (4 October 1928 – 25 May 2007) was a Belgian film critic, film journalist, director and television host.

== Career ==
For over more than 30 years, starting from the 1960s, Röpcke presented the film magazine show Premiere on BRT, the publicly funded state television channel for the Flanders region of Belgium. Röpcke was known for a dry but charming presentation style with critical, and sometimes humorous or ironic side remarks.

Röpcke also gained an international profile as a film journalist and critic. He was a researcher at the Université libre de Bruxelles (ULB) between 1953 and 1958 and at the RUG University in Ghent from 1958 until 1962. He was professor of film analysis and rector at the Brussels' film school the Royal Institute for Theatre, Cinema and Sound (RITCS), and president of the Film Festival of Brussels (BE).

After his death in 2007, the Jo Röpcke-award was established.

== Work as TV director ==
- The BRT-news (VRT)
- Echo, BRT, (VRT)
- Panorama, TV documentary show (BRT)
- Zoeklicht, cultural show (BRT)
