= Frédéric Devreese =

Belgian composer (1929–2020)

- Born: 2 June 1929; Amsterdam
- Died: 28 September 2020 (aged 91); Brussels
- Occupations: Composer, conductor
- Years active: 1949–2020
- Spouse: Annie De Clerck
- Awards: Order of the Crown; Order of Leopold II
- Website: www.fdevreese.be

Frédéric Devreese (2 June 1929 – 28 September 2020) was a Belgian composer of mostly orchestral, chamber and piano works that have been performed throughout the world; he was also active as a conductor. Devreese is known for his film scores, including Benvenuta by André Delvaux and The Cruel Embrace by Marion Hänsel.

== Career ==
Born in Amsterdam, Devreese received his first musical training from his father, the composer-conductor Godfried Devreese (1893–1972).

He studied composition with Marcel Poot and conducting with René Defossez in Brussels, composition with Ildebrando Pizzetti at the Accademia Santa Cecilia in Rome from 1952 to 1955 and conducting with Hans Swarowsky at the University of Music and Performing Arts, Vienna in 1955–56.

Devreese composed music for piano, chamber music, orchestra, choir, opera and ballet, but became widely known initially for his film scores. In addition, he wrote the imposed work for the Reine Elisabeth music competition in Brussels (1983, Concerto No. 4) and the Adolphe Sax competition in Dinant (1998, Ostinati).

He served as conductor of the BRT Philharmonic Orchestra and guest-conducted orchestras throughout the world. For his recordings for Marco Polo's series Anthology of Flemish Music, he was nominated for the Cultural Ambassador of Flanders in 1996–97.

== Personal life ==
Devreese was married to Annie De Clerck. He died of cancer.

== Awards ==
Devreese received the following prizes:

- Prijs Oostende Piano Competition (1949, for Concerto No. 1)
- Prix Italia (1964, for Willem van Saefthingen, together with Mark Liebrecht)
- Joseph Plateau Award (1990, for Het Sacrament)
- Georges Delerue Award (1994, for La partie d'échecs)

== Honours ==
- Knight of the Order of the Crown
- Knight of the Order of Leopold II

He was knighted by Albert II of Belgium in 1996. His motto is Tenuto.

== Works ==
=== Stage ===
- Willem van Saefthinge, TV opera (1962–63), libretto by Jean Francis
- Le Cavalier bizarre, opera (1976), libretto by Michel de Ghelderode

=== Orchestral ===
- Concerto No. 1, piano, orchestra (1949)
- Concerto, violin, orchestra (1951)
- Concerto No. 2, piano, orchestra (1952)
- Symphony (1952)
- Concerto No. 3, piano, orchestra (1955)
- Mascarade Suite (1956)
- Deux Mouvements, string orchestra (1953–63)
- Evocation Suite (1966)
- Divertimenti, string orchestra (1970)
- Overture, large orchestra (1976)
- Concerto No. 4, piano, orchestra (1983)
- Pré (1983)
- Benvenuta Suite (1984)
- Gemini Suite, 2 orchestras (1986), version of work for 2 pianos
- L'Oeuvre au noir Suite (1988)
- Masque, brass band (1989)
- Valse Sacrée (1989)
- Thème et Danse (1989)
- Belle Suite, string orchestra (1991)
- Variations and Theme, string orchestra (1992)
- Valse Sacrée, string orchestra (1994)
- La partie d'échecs Suite, string orchestra (1995)
- Ostinati (concertino), alto saxophone, accordion, string orchestra (1998)
- Concertino, cello, bandoneón, string orchestra (1998)
- Concerto, cello, orchestra (1999)

=== Chamber music ===
- Complainte, oboe, piano (1953)
- Divertimenti a due, violin, cello (1968)
- Divertimenti, string quartet (1970)
- Suite No. 1, French horn, 2 trumpets, trombone, tuba (1970)
- 4 Short Waltzes, 4 recorders (1979)
- Suite No. 2, French horn, 2 trumpets, trombone, tuba (1981)
- 5 Divertimenti, 4 saxophones (1985)
- Benvenuta, violin, piano (1987)
- Valse Sa, ensemble (1987)
- Sax Blues, alto saxophone, piano (1989)
- Benvenuta, violin, cello, piano (1990)
- Berceuse et Finale, violin, piano (1991)
- Three Dances, 10 winds (1991)
- Passage, harmonica, jazz ensemble (1994)
- Divertimenti a due, guitar, violin (1996)
- Suite, alto saxophone, piano (1998)
- Récitativo et Allegro, trumpet, piano (2000)
- Canti, cello (or viola), piano (2000)
- Blues, trumpet, piano (2001)
- Quartet, violin, viola, cello, piano (2001)
- 3 Pieces, flute/alto saxophone, piano (2002)
- James Ensor Quartet (quartet no. 2), 4 saxophones (2002)
- Passage à 5, guitar (+ electric guitar), violin, double bass, piano, accordion (2002)

=== Choral ===
- Four Old Flemish Songs, mixed chorus (1966)
- Ballade for Damien, children's chorus, harmonica, string orchestra (1988)

=== Piano ===
- Mascarade (1953)
- Prélude (1972)
- Gemini Suite, 2 pianos (1980), also version for 2 orchestras
- Black and White (9 Easy Pieces) (1984)
- Lullaby for Jesse (1992)
- Short Waltzes (1997)
- Mobile I, piano 4 hands (2000)
- Soundtrack 1–3 (30 pieces) (1972–2001)
- 9 Waltzes (2001)

=== Film scores (by director) ===
- 1965 – De Grafbewaker (Harry Kümel)
- 1965 – De man die zijn haar kort liet knippen (André Delvaux)
- 1966 – De Overkant (Herman Wuyts)
- 1968 – Un soir, un train (André Delvaux)
- 1971 – Rendez-vous à Bray (André Delvaux)
- 1973 – Belle (André Delvaux)
- 1976 – Du bout des lèvres (Jean-Marie Degèsves)
- 1981 – Le filet américain (Robbe De Hert, Chris Verbiest)
- 1981 – De Witte Duif Véronique Steeno
- 1983 – Benvenuta (André Delvaux)
- 1987 – The Cruel Embrace (Marion Hänsel)
- 1988 – L'Œuvre au noir (André Delvaux)
- 1989 – Het Sacrament (Hugo Claus)
- 1990 – Il Maestro (Marion Hänsel)
- 1994 – La partie d'échecs (Yves Hanchar)
- 2001 – Pauline en Paulette (Lieven Debrauwer)
- 2003 – Mein Name ist Bach (Dominique de Rivaz)

== Discography ==
As composer

- Concerto Nos. 2-4 – Daniel Blumenthal, piano; Frédéric Devreese/BRT Filharmonisch Orkest (Marco Polo: 8.223505, 1993)
- Soundtrack 1-3 – André De Groote, piano (Marco Polo: 8.223651, 1994)
- Benvenuta; Un soir, un train; l'Oeuvre au noir; Belle (suites) – Frédéric Devreese/BRT Filharmonisch Orkest (Marco Polo: 8.223681, 1994)
- Overture; Concerto No. 1; Gemini Suite (both versions); Valse Sacrée; Lullaby for Jesse; Black and White (9 Easy Pieces); Mascarade – Daniel Blumenthal, Robert Groslot, pianos; Walter Gillessen, Georges-Élie Octors, Fernand Terby, Frédéric Devreese/orchestras (Cyprès: 1619, 1999)
- Three Dances – I Solisti del Vento (Galaxy Studios/I Solisti del Vento: 99-01, 1999)
- Passage à 5 – Soledad (Virgin Classics: VC 45625, 2003)
- L'Oeuvre au noir – Frédéric Devreese/Nationaal Orkest van België (Barclay: 835 901)
- Het Sacrament – Frédéric Devreese/BRT Filharmonisch Orkest (Indisc: 3654)
- La partie d'échecs – (Virgin: 8040029)
- Variations and Theme; Concerto (violin) – Henry Raudales, violin; Frédéric Devreese/orchestra; Dirk Brossé/Symfonisch Orkest van Vlaanderen (RG Productions: 87080)
- Masque – James Watson/Desford Colliery Caterpillar Band (De Haske: DHM 3.002.3)
- Suite No. 1 – Beaux-Arts Brass Quintet (De Haske: DHR 5.005–3)

As conductor (excluding his own music)

- Tombelène; Concerto No. 1 (violin); Concerto (cello) (Godfried Devreese) – Guido de Neve, violin; Viviane Spanoghe, cello; BRT Filharmonisch Orkest (Marco Polo: 8.223680, 1994)
- Symphony No. 1 in A minor, The Gothic; Poème Héroïque; In memoriam (Godfried Devreese) – Moscow Symphony Orchestra (Marco Polo: 8.223739, 1995)
- Symphony in G; Concerto (violin); Dahomeyan Rhapsody (August De Boeck) – Guido de Neve, violin; Frédéric Devreese, Gerard Oskamp/Koninklijk Filharmonisch Orkest van Vlaanderen (Marco Polo: 8.223740, 1995)
- Symphony No. 6; Pygmalion Suite; Symphonic Allegro; Vrolijke Ouverture (Marcel Poot) – Moscow Symphony Orchestra (Marco Polo: 8.223775, 1996)
- Plinius' Fontein; Symphony Nos. 2-3; Meinacht (Arthur Meulemans) – Moscow Symphony Orchestra (Marco Polo: 8.223776, 1996)
- Moto Perpetuo; Symphony Nos. 3, 5, 7 (Marcel Poot) – Moscow Symphony Orchestra (Marco Polo: 8.223805, 1996)
- La Mer; Mélodies Écossaises; Alvar; Symphonic Overture No. 3 (Paul Gilson) – Moscow Symphony Orchestra (Marco Polo: 8.223809, 1996)
- Concerto Nos. 1-2 (piano) (Arthur De Greef) – André De Groote, piano; Moscow Symphony Orchestra (Marco Polo: 8.223810, 1996)
- Symphony No. 1; Mater Dolorosa Suite; Rossiniazata (Daniël Sternefeld) – Moscow Symphony Orchestra (Marco Polo: 8.223813, 1996)
- Concerto (flute); Le roi des aulnes; Concerto (piano) (Peter Benoit) – Gaby Pas-Van Riet, flute; Luc Devos, piano; Koninklijk Filharmonisch Orkest van Vlaanderen (Marco Polo: 8.223827, 1996)
