= Benvenuta (film) =

- Directed by: André Delvaux
- Produced by: Jean-Claude Batz; Renzo Rossellini
- Cinematography: Charles Van Damme
- Music by: Frédéric Devreese
- Release date: 1983
- Language: French

Benvenuta is a 1983 Belgian-French-Italian romantic drama film written and directed by André Delvaux. It is based on the Suzanne Lilar's novel La Confession anonyme.

== Cast ==
- Fanny Ardant - Benvenuta
- Vittorio Gassman - Livio Carpi
- Françoise Fabian - Jeanne
- Mathieu Carrière - François
- Claire Wauthion - Inge
- Philippe Geluck - Father
- Anne Chappuis - Mother
- Armando Marra - Le chanteur
- Renato Scarpa - The Journalist
- Franco Trevisi - Le policier
