= Johan Daisne =

Flemish author

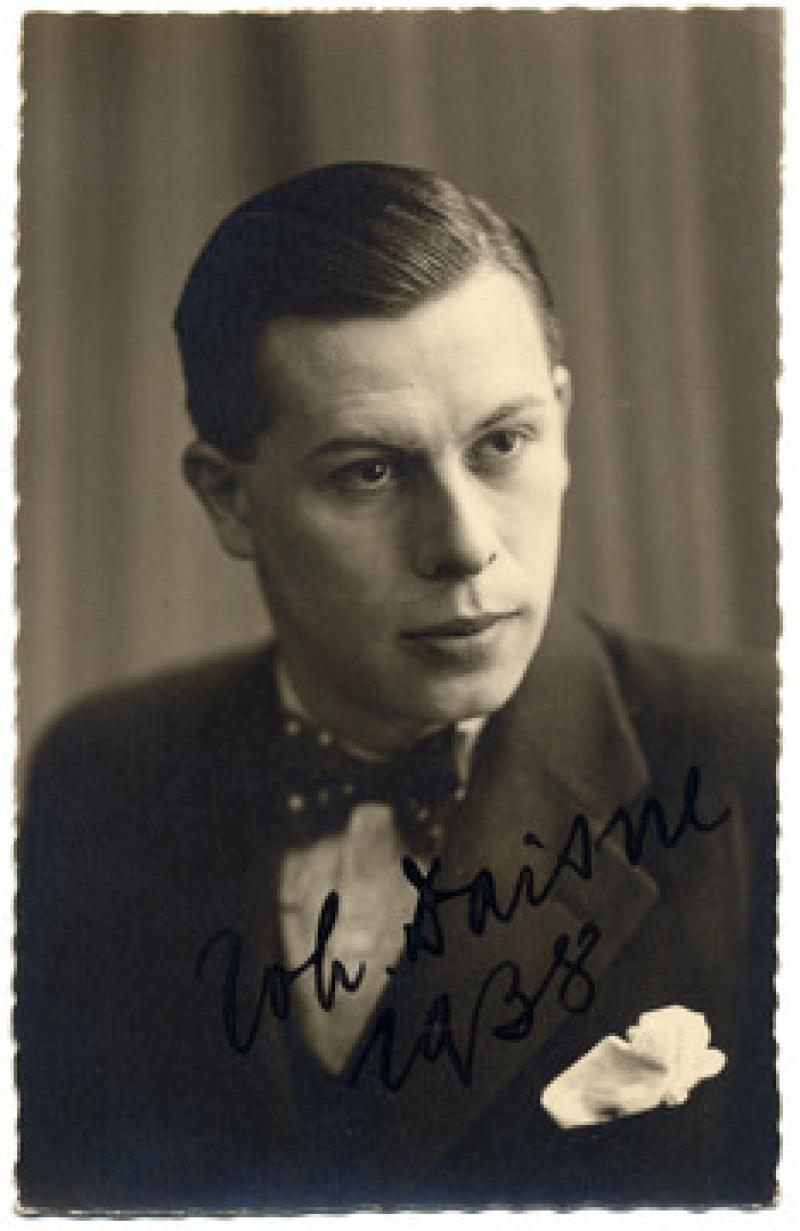
Johan Daisne (1938)

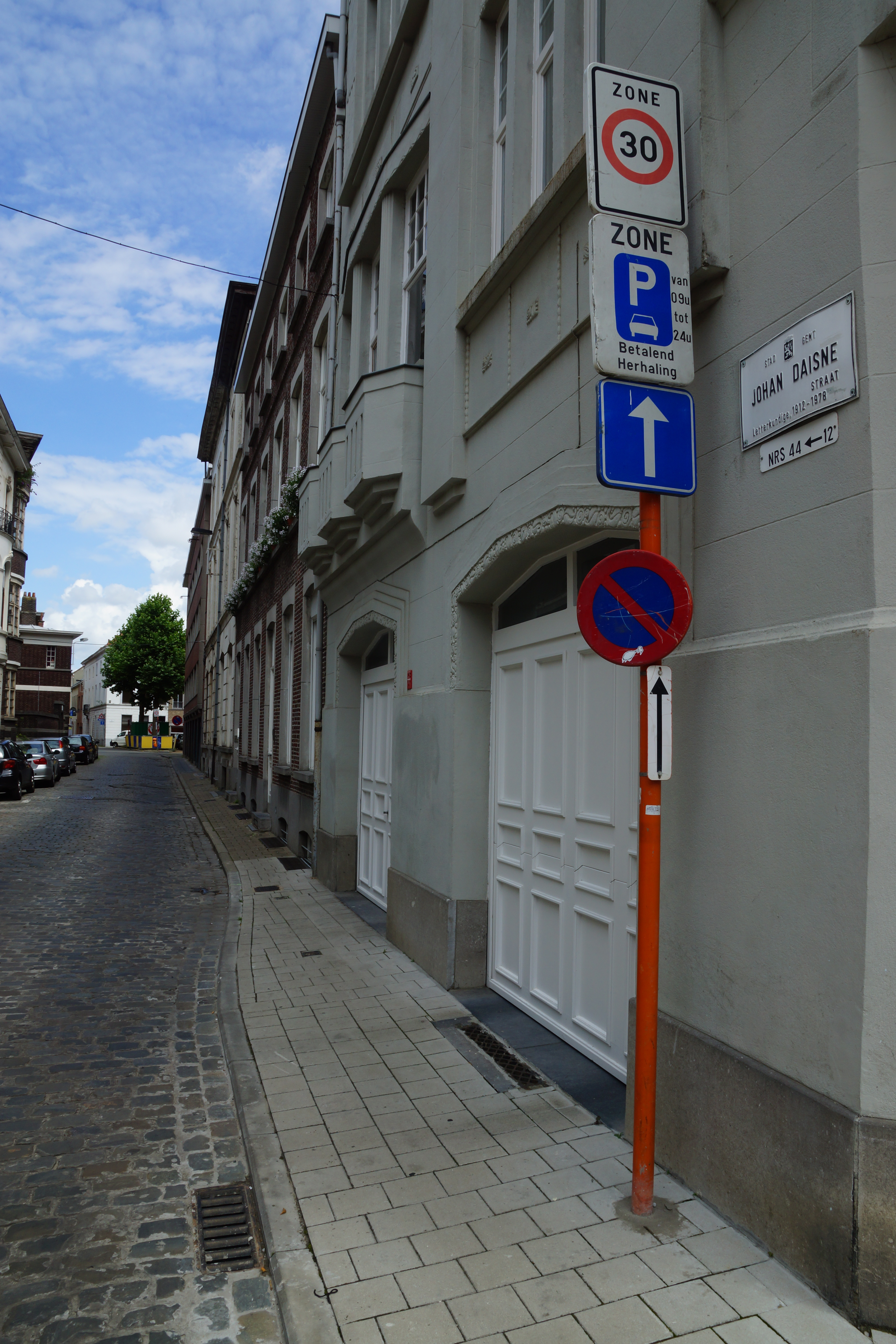
The Johan Daisne Street in Ghent

Johan Daisne was the pseudonym of Flemish author Herman Thiery (2 September 1912 – 9 August 1978). Born in Ghent, Belgium, he attended the Koninklijk Atheneum before studying Economics and Slavic languages at Ghent University, receiving his doctorate in 1936. In 1945 he was appointed chief librarian of the city of Ghent.

== Biography ==
Thiery began writing under the pen-name Johan Daisne in 1935, with the publication of a collection of poetry entitled Verzen. This was followed by other poetical works including Het einde van een zomer (1940), Ikonakind (1946), Het kruid-aan-de-balk (1953) and De nacht komt gauw genoeg (1961). Together with Hubert Lampo, he was one of the pioneers of magic realism in the Dutch language writing with his novels, the best known of which are De trap van steen en wolken (1942), De man die zijn haar kort liet knippen (1947) (translated as The man who had his hair cut short, 1965), and De trein der traagheid (1953).

He also wrote screenplays, radio plays and non-fiction. His quadrilingual Filmografisch lexicon der wereldliteratuur (3 volumes, 1971, 1973 and 1978) developed from his association with the Knokke film festival.

== Translations into English ==
- The Man Who Had His Hair Cut Short (1965)
- Filmographic Dictionary of World Literature (1971) ISBN 0-391-01585-0
- Writing in Holland and Flanders 31 (1972) (by Johan Daisne and Jacques Hamelink)

== See also ==
- Flemish literature
