= List of LGBTQ-related films of 1996 =

This is a list of lesbian, gay, bisexual, transgender or queer-related films released in 1996. It contains theatrically released films that deal with important gay, lesbian, bisexual, transgender or queer characters or issues and may have same-sex romance or relationships as a plot device.

== Films ==
Title	Director	Country	Genre	Cast	Notes
Achilles	Barry Purves	United Kingdom	Short	Derek Jacobi (Narrator), and voices of Simon Green, David Holt and Tim Morgan	11 min long animation.
American Buffalo	Michael Corrente	United Kingdom; United States	Drama	Dustin Hoffman, Dennis Franz, Sean Nelson	Screenplay by David Mamet, based on his stage play of the same name
Army Daze	Keng Sen Ong	Singapore	Comedy	Edward Yong Ching Tah, Sheikh Haikel, Ahamed Azad, Adrian Lim Meng Kiat, Kevin Mark Marghese, Margaret Chan, Jacintha Charles, Eileen Wee Ling Yin, Daniel Gan Wei Teck, Rajagopal Kesavadas, Elaine Li Hoon Cheah, Julian Jay Huang, Ong Chuen Boone, Deanna Yusoff and Lim Kay Tong	
Bambola	Bigas Luna	Spain	Comedy, drama	Valeria Marini, Stefano Dionisi, Jorge Perugorría, Manuel Bandera, Antonino Iuorio and Anita Ekberg	
Basquiat	Julian Schnabel	United States	Biography, drama	Jeffrey Wright, David Bowie	Biopic of artist Jean-Michel Basquiat
Beautiful Thing	Hettie MacDonald	United Kingdom	Romance, comedy, drama	Glen Berry, Scott Neal, Linda Henry, Ben Daniels, Tameka Empson, Jeillo Edwards, Anna Karen, Sophie Stanton, Julie Smith, Terry Duggan, Garry Cooper, Daniel Bowers, Meera Syal, Martin Walsh, Steven Martin, Andrew Fraser, John Savage, Ozdemir Mamodeally, John Benfield, Davyd Harries, Beth Goddard, Marlene Sidaway, Liane Ware, Catherine Sanderson and Dave Lynn	Screenplay by Jonathan Harvey, based on his stage play of the same name
The Birdcage	Mike Nichols	United States	Comedy, drama	Robin Williams, Gene Hackman, Nathan Lane, Dianne Wiest, Dan Futterman, Calista Flockhart, Hank Azaria, Christine Baranski, Tom McGowan, Grant Heslov and Kirby Mitchell	Remake of La Cage aux Folles
Body Without Soul	Wiktor Grodecki	Czech Republic	Documentary	Various young boys working as prostitutes in Prague	a.k.a. Tělo bez duše
Bound	The Wachowskis	United States	Crime, drama	Gina Gershon, Jennifer Tilly, Joe Pantoliano, Mary Mara, Susie Bright, Margaret Smith, Barry Kivel, Christopher Meloni, John Ryan, Peter Spellos, Ivan Kane, Kevin M. Richardson, Richard C. Sarafian and Gene Borkan	
Boyfriends	Tom Hunsinger, Neil Hunter	United Kingdom	Comedy	James Dreyfus, Mark Sands, Michael Urwin, Andrew Ableson, David Coffey, Darren Petrucci, Michael McGrath and Russell Higgs	
Bubbles Galore	Cynthia Roberts	Canada	Comedy	Nina Hartley, Daniel MacIvor, Tracy Wright, Annie Sprinkle	
Butch Camp	Alessandro De Gaetano	United States	Comedy	Judy Tenuta, Paul Denniston, Jason Teresi, Jordan Roberts, Bill Ingraham, Jon Kimlicko, Eric Aviles, Alan Ball, Kate Barnett, Stephanine Ferrell, Chris Goldin, Richard Henzel, Joel Himelhoch, Adam Joyce and Amber J. Lawson	
Camping Cosmos	Jan Bucquoy	Belgium	Comedy	Jean-Henri Compère, Fanny Hanciaux, Lolo Ferrari, Jean-Paul Dermont, Noe Francq (credited as Noé Francq), Claude Semal, Noël Godin, Jacques Calonne, Arno Hintjens, Herman Brusselmans, Jan Decleir, Patricia Dollez, Sabrina Leurquin, Catherine Claeys and Isabelle Legros	
Cosmos	Jennifer Alleyn, Manon Briand, Marie-Julie Dalliare, Arto Paragamian, André Turpin, Denis Villeneuve	Canada	Anthology	Igor Ovadis	Collection on six short films, all linked by a titular character played by Ovadis
Crash	David Cronenberg	United Kingdom; Canada	Horror, drama	James Spader, Deborah Kara Unger, Elias Koteas, Holly Hunter, Rosanna Arquette, Peter MacNeill, Judah Katz, Nicky Guadagni, Boyd Banks and David Cronenberg (voice)	
Cynara: Poetry in Motion	Nicole Conn	United States	Short, drama, romance	Johanna Nemeth and Melissa Hellman	
The Delta	Ira Sachs	United States	Drama	Shayne Gray, Thang Chan, Rachel Zan Huss, Colonious David, Charles J. Ingram, Mai Ballard, Gene Crain, J.R. Crumpton, Richard Daggett, Melissa A. Dunn, Polly Edelstein, Ron Gephart, Patricia A. Gill, Erin Grills and Robert Hathaway	
Different for Girls	Richard Spence	United Kingdom; France	Comedy	Rupert Graves, Steven Mackintosh, Miriam Margolyes, Saskia Reeves, Charlotte Coleman, Nisha Nayar, Neil Dudgeon and Adrian Rawlins	
East Palace, West Palace	Zhang Yuan	China	Drama	Si Han, Hu Jun, Jing Ye and Wei Zhao	a.k.a. Behind the Forbidden City and Behind the Palace Gates
The Escort	Denis Langlois	Canada	Comedy	Paul-Antoine Taillefer, Eric Cabana, Robin Aubert, Marie-Claude Lefebvre, Patrice Coquereau, Jasmin Roy, Louise Laprade, Bernadette Li, David Savard, Félix Aubert-Surprenant, Benoît Ethier, François Tardif, Mario Thibeault, Denis Langlois and Karim Toupin-Chaieb	a.k.a. L'escorte
Fire	Deepa Mehta	India; Canada	Drama	Nandita Das, Shabana Azmi, Karishma Jhalani, Ramanjit Kaur, Dilip Mehta, Javed Jaffrey, Vinay Pathak, Kushal Rekhi, Ranjit Chowdhry, Kulbhushan Kharbanda, Alice Poon, Ram Gopal Bajaj, Ravinder Happy, Devyani Saltzman, Sunil Chabra, Avijit Dutt, Shasea Bahadur, Meher Chand, Bahadur Chand, Kabir Chowdhury and Laurence Côte	
Flirting with Disaster	David O. Russell	United States	Black Comedy	Ben Stiller, Patricia Arquette, Téa Leoni, Alan Alda, Mary Tyler Moore	
Foxfire	Annette Haywood-Carter	United States	Drama	Angelina Jolie, Hedy Burress, Jenny Lewis, Jenny Shimizu, Peter Facinelli	
Freeway	Matthew Bright	United States	Dark Comedy, Crime	Kiefer Sutherland, Reese Witherspoon, Dan Hedaya, Amanda Plummer, Brooke Shields, Wolfgang Bodison	
Flow	Quentin Lee	United States; Canada	Drama	Francis Acquas, Mark Bringelson, Ray Chang, BP Cheng, Lela Lee, Jeremy Maxwell (credited as Jeremy Maxwell Kramer), Tedd Szeto and Paulino Tamayo	
Get on the Bus	Spike Lee	United States	Drama	Charles S. Dutton, Ossie Davis, Thomas Jefferson Byrd, De'Aundre Bonds, Isaiah Washington, Harry Lennix, Andre Braugher, Roger Guenveur Smith, Hill Harper, Gabriel Casseus, Bernie Mac, Steve White and Albert Hall	
Green Plaid Shirt	Richard Natale	United States	Drama, romance	Gregory Phelan, Kevin Spirtas, Richard Israel, Russell Scott Lewis, Crystal Jackson, Jonathan Klein, Tony Campisi, Sierra Pecheur, William Wesley, Justin Ross, Richard Miro (credited as Richard Ortega Miro), Ric Coy, Michael Latimer, Jeffrey Rockwell and Heather Finnegan	It was the closing night film at the Palm Springs Film Festival
Hollow Reed	Angela Pope	United Kingdom; Germany; Spain	Drama	Martin Donovan, Joely Richardson, Sam Bould, Ian Hart, Jason Flemyng, Roger Lloyd-Pack, David Calder and Edward Hardwicke	
Hustler White	Rick Castro, Bruce LaBruce	Germany; Canada	Romance, drama	Tony Ward, Bruce La Bruce, Alex Austin, Kevin Kramer, Ron Athey, Glen Meadmore, Ivar Johnson, Kevin P. Scott, Graham David Smith, Miles H. Wildecock II, Bud Cockerham, Michael Glass, Vaginal Davis, Joaquín Martínez, Darryl Carlton, Tony Powers, Paul 'Superhustler' Bateman, Barry Morse (credited as Dimitri Xolt), Paul Bellini, Matt Johnstone, Max Millan, Sean McAndrew, Ryan McAndrew, Stephen Mounce, Brent Hoover, Merie Morris, Billy Mauro, Rocco Haze, Antonio Lee Klatt, Chris Berry and Rick Castro	
Indian Summer	Nancy Meckler	United Kingdom	Comedy, drama	Jason Flemyng, Antony Sher, Bill Nighy, Diane Parish, Dorothy Tutin, Anthony Higgins, Philip Voss, Aiden Waters, Natalie Roles, Freddy Douglas, Kenneth Tharp, Michael Keegan-Dolan, Ruth Lass, Linda Bassett and Hilary Reynolds	
I Shot Andy Warhol	Mary Harron	United States; United Kingdom	Biography, drama	Lili Taylor, Jared Harris, Stephen Dorff, Martha Plimpton, Lothaire Bluteau, Anna Levine, Peter Friedman, Tahnee Welch, Jamie Harrold, Donovan Leitch, Jim Lyons, Michael Imperioli, Reg Rogers, Bill Sage, Justin Theroux, Jill Hennessy, Coco McPherson, Lorraine Farris, Craig Chester, Victor Browne, Billy Erb, Anh Duong and Myriam Cyr	Based on the life of Valerie Solanas and her relationship with Andy Warhol
Istanbul Beneath My Wings	Mustafa Altıoklar	Turkey	Drama, romance, adventure	Ege Aydan, Okan Bayülgen, Beatriz Rico, Burak Sergen, Savaş Ay, Zuhal Olcay, Haluk Bilginer, Tuncel Kurtiz, Giovanni Scognamillo, Berke Hürcan, Akasya Asıltürkmen and Cüneyt Çalışkur	
It's My Party	Randal Kleiser	United States	Drama	Eric Roberts, Margaret Cho, Lee Grant, Bruce Davison, Olivia Newton-John, Devon Gummersall, George Segal, Marlee Matlin, Gregory Harrison, Bronson Pinchot, Roddy McDowall, Steve Antin, Sally Kellerman, Lou Liberatore, Nina Foch, Christopher Atkins, Dennis Christopher, Ron Glass and Paul Regina	Based on the death of architect/designer Harry Stein, who was Kleiser's ex-lover
Jim Loves Jack	David Adkin	Canada	Documentary	Jim Egan and John Norris "Jack" Nesbit	Same-sex couple who were at the centre of the landmark Supreme Court of Canada case.
johns	Scott Silver	United States	Drama	David Arquette, Lukas Haas, Wilson Cruz, Keith David, Christopher Gartin, Elliott Gould, Terrence Dashon Howard, Nicky Katt, Richard Kind, John C. McGinley, Richard Timothy Jones, Alanna Ubach, Arliss Howard, Nina Siemaszko and Craig Bierko	
Kids in the Hall: Brain Candy	Kelly Makin	Canada; United States	Comedy	Dave Foley, Bruce McCulloch, Kevin McDonald	
Killer Condom	Martin Walz	Germany; Switzerland	Romance, comedy, horror	Udo Samel, Peter Lohmeyer, Iris Berben, Leonard Lansink as Babette (Bob Miller) Marc Richter, Evelyn Künneke (credited as Evelyn Künnecke), Hella von Sinnen, Heribert Sasse, Meret Becker, Gerd Wameling, Henning Schlüter, Ron Williams, Otto Sander, Monika Hansen and Gode Benedix	a.k.a. Kondom des Grauens (Translates as Condom of Horror)
Les Puceaux	François Ozon	France	Short, erotic	Valérie Druguet, François Delaive, Camille Japy, Philippe Dajoux, Evelyne Ker, Loïc Even, Lucia Sanchez, François Genty, Pascale Arbillot, Régine Mondion, Margot Abascal, Bruno Slagmulder, Sébastien Charles and Jérémie Elkaïm	a.k.a. Scènes de lit. Les Puceaux
Life and Death on the A-list	Jay Corcoran	United States	Documentary		Follows actor Tom McBride in the final months of his life.
Lilies	John Greyson	Canada	Romance, drama	Brent Carver, Marcel Sabourin, Aubert Pallascio, Jason Cadieux, Matthew Ferguson, Danny Gilmore, Alexander Chapman, Ian D. Clark, Gary Farmer, Robert Lalonde, Rémy Girard, John Dunn-Hill, Paul-Patrice Charbonneau and Michel Marc Bouchard	Co-written by Michel Marc Bouchard, based on his stage play of the same name
Love and Other Catastrophes	Emma-Kate Croghan	Australia	Romance, comedy, drama	Matt Day, Matthew Dyktynski, Alice Garner, Frances O'Connor, Radha Mitchell, Suzi Dougherty, Kim Gyngell, Suzanne Dowling, Torquil Neilson, Christine Stephen-Daly, Dominic McDonald, Alvin Chong, Myles Collins, Antony Neate and Brigid Kelly	
Mum's the Word (Maman et Ève)	Paul Carrière	Canada	Documentary	Rachel, Suzanne, Jeannine and Paulette, four Franco-Ontarian women in their mid-40s in Sudbury, Ontario, who, after marrying and raising children, are in the process of coming out as lesbian	Won the Genie Award for Best Short Documentary Film at the 17th Genie Awards.
Must Be the Music	Nickolas Perry	Spain	Drama, short	Milo Ventimiglia, Michael Saucedo	
My Night with Reg	Roger Michell	United Kingdom	Drama	David Bamber, Anthony Calf, Joe Duttine, Roger Frost, Kenneth MacDonald and John Sessions	Screenplay by Kevin Elyot, based on his stage play of the same name
Not Love, Just Frenzy	Alfonso Albacete, Miguel Bardem, David Menkes	Spain	Comedy, drama, thriller	Nancho Novo, Cayetana Guillén Cuervo, Ingrid Rubio, Beatriz Santiago, Gustavo Salmerón, Javier Manrique, Javier Albalá, Liberto Rabal, Bibiana Fernández (credited as Bibí Andersen), Juan Diego Botto, Daniel Mirabal, Juanfra Becerra, Paloma Tabasco, Nuria Gallardo, Carlos Bardem and Penélope Cruz	a.k.a. Más que amor, frenesí
Paul Monette: The Brink of Summer's End	Monte Bramer	United States	Documentary	Judith Light, Robert Desiderio, Winston Wilde, Larry Kramer and Star Black	Sundance Film Festival winner Best Documentary
Pédale douce	Gabriel Aghion	France	Comedy	Patrick Timsit, Fanny Ardant, Richard Berry, Michèle Laroque, Jacques Gamblin, Dominique Besnehard, Christian Bujeau and Boris Terral	
The People vs. Larry Flynt	Miloš Forman	United States	Biography, drama	Woody Harrelson, Courtney Love, Edward Norton	Depicts the life of Flynt from 1952 to 1987
Red Ribbon Blues	Charles Winkler	United States	Comedy, drama	Paul Mercurio, Debi Mazar, RuPaul, John Epperson, Lisa Waltz, David Spielberg, Leland Orser, Alan Boyce, Gabriella Lamiel, Robert Sherman, Steve Park, Margo Winkler, Lee Mathis, Paul Bartel and Charles Winkler	
Regular Guys	Rolf Silber	Germany	Romance, comedy	Christoph M. Ohrt, Carin C. Tietze, Tim Bergmann, Oliver Stokowski, Rudolf Kowalski, Dieter Brandecker, Daniela Ziegler, Ina Weisse, Andreas Pietschmann, Heinz Werner Kraehkamp, Edgar M. Böhlke (credited as Edgar M. Boehlke), Antonio Putignano, Martin Ankermann, Karina Marmann and Philipp Seiser	a.k.a. Echte Kerle
Sacred Silence	Antonio Capuano	Italy	Drama	Fabrizio Bentivoglio, Emanuele Gargiulo, Rosaria De Cicco, Teresa Saponangelo and Tonino Taiuti	a.k.a. Pianese Nunzio, 14 anni a Maggio (Pianese Nunzio, 14 in May)
Set It Off	F. Gary Gray	United States	Action, crime, drama	Jada Pinkett, Queen Latifah, Vivica A. Fox, Kimberly Elise, John C. McGinley, Blair Underwood, Ella Joyce, Charlie Robinson as Nate Andrews Dr. Dre, WC, Charles Walker, Mark Thompson, F. Gary Gray, Geoff Callan, Natalie Desselle, Chaz Lamar Shepard, Thomas Jefferson Byrd and Samuel Monroe Jr.	
Sling Blade	Billy Bob Thornton	United States	Drama	Billy Bob Thornton, J. T. Walsh, John Ritter, Lucas Black, Natalie Canerday, James Hampton, Robert Duvall, Jim Jarmusch, Vic Chesnutt, Brent Briscoe and Mickey Jones	
Skin & Bone	Everett Lewis	United States	Comedy	B. Wyatt, Alan Boyce, Nicole Dillenberg, Garret Scullin, Chad Kula, Susannah Melvoin, Clark Heathcliff Brolly (credited as Clark Heathcliffe Brolly), Gregory Sporleder, Richard Mitrani, Chris Wetzel, Michael Nehring, Michael Haynes, Greg Jackson, Chris Reahm and Andrea Beane	
A Summer Dress	François Ozon	France	Short	Frédéric Mangenot, Sébastien Charles and Lucia Sanchez	
Tender Fictions	Barbara Hammer	United States	Documentary	Barbara Hammer	It was screened at the 1996 Sundance Film Festival and was nominated for the Grand Jury Prize. It also played at the Berlin International Film Festival, the Ann Arbor Film Festival, the Charlotte Film and Video Festival and the Yamagata International Documentary Film Festival.
The Toilers and the Wayfarers	Keith Froelich	United States	Drama	Matt Klemp, Ralf Schirg, Andrew Woodhouse, Jerome Samuels, Michael Glen, Ralph Jacobus, Douglas Blacks, Anthony C. Paul, Johanna Stucki, Alex Cole and Michael A. Sward	
The Watermelon Woman	Cheryl Dunye	United States	Documentary, drama	Cheryl Dunye, Guinevere Turner, Valarie Walker, Lisa Marie Bronson, Cheryl Clarke, Irene Dunye, Brian Freeman, Camille Paglia, Sarah Schulman, V.S. Brodie and Robert Reid-Pharr	First feature film to be directed by a black lesbian
