= List of Belgian films of the 1990s =

A list of films produced in Belgium ordered by year of release. For an alphabetical list of Belgian films see Category:Belgian films

Title	Director	Cast	Genre	Notes
1990
The Sacrament	Hugo Claus			Screened at the 1990 Cannes Film Festival
Romeo-Juliet	Armando Acosta	John Hurt, Vanessa Redgrave, Ben Kingsley, Maggie Smith		
1991
Boys	Jan Verheyen	Michael Pas, Tom Van Bauwel, Francesca Vanthielen, Hilde Heijnen	Comedy	
Toto le héros (Totò the Hero)	Jaco Van Dormael			Belgian-French-German co-production
1992
C'est arrivé près de chez vous (Man Bites Dog)	Rémy Belvaux, André Bonzel, Benoît Poelvoorde	Rémy Belvaux, André Bonzel, Benoît Poelvoorde	Mockumentary	
Daens	Stijn Coninx	Jan Decleir, Michael Pas, Antje de Boeck	Historical drama	Belgian-Dutch-French co-production; Academy Award for Best Foreign Language Film nominee; based on the life of Adolf Daens
1993
Abracadabra	Harry Cleven	Philippe Volter		
Ad Fundum	Erik Van Looy	Jaak Van Assche, Sven De Ridder, Tom Van Landuyt, Tuur De Weert, Tom Van Bauwel		
Beck - De gesloten kamer	Jacob Bijl	Jan Decleir, Els Dottermans, Warre Borgmans, Josse De Pauw, Ingrid De Vos	Crime	Belgian-Dutch co-production; based on the Sjöwall and Wahlöö novel The Locked Room
Close	Paul Collet	Katia Alens	Crime, Drama	
1994
Farinelli	Gérard Corbiau	Stefano Dionisi, Enrico Lo Verso, Elsa Zylberstein	Drama	Academy Award for Best Foreign Language Film nominee, Golden Globe Award for Best Foreign Language Film winner
Taxandria	Raoul Servais	Armin Mueller-Stahl	Fantasy	Belgian-German-French co-production; partially animated
La Vie sexuelle des Belges 1950-1978	Jan Bucquoy	Herman Brusselmans, Jan Bucquoy		Followed by Camping Cosmos
The Violin Player	Charles Van Damme			Entered into the 1994 Cannes Film Festival
1995
Antonia (Antonia's Line)	Marleen Gorris	Willeke van Ammelrooy, Els Dottermans, Dora van der Groen, Jan Decleir, Michael Pas	Comedy-drama	Dutch-Belgian-British co-production; Academy Award for Best Foreign Language Film winner (representing the Netherlands)
Between the Devil and the Deep Blue Sea	Marion Hänsel			Entered into the 1995 Cannes Film Festival
Brylcream Boulevard	Robbe De Hert	Michael Pas, Frank Aendenboom, Babette van Veen, Hilde Heijnen, Gert-Jan Dröge	Comedy-drama	Dutch-Belgian co-production; sequel to Blueberry Hill: A Love Story from the Fifties
The Passion of Darkly Noon	Philip Ridley	Brendan Fraser, Ashley Judd, Viggo Mortensen	Drama	Belgian-British-German co-production
1996
Alles moet weg	Jan Verheyen	Stany Crets, Peter Van den Begin, Bart De Pauw, Jaak Van Assche	Comedy-drama	
Camping Cosmos	Jan Bucquoy	Lolo Ferrari, Arno, Herman Brusselmans, Jan Decleir, Marcel Vanthilt, Jan Bucquoy, Antje de Boeck	Comedy	Sequel to La Vie sexuelle des Belges 1950-1978
Elixir d'Anvers	Boris Paval Conen, Robbe De Hert, Nathalie Deklerck, Wolke Kluppell, Wim Symoens, Filip Van Neyghem, Tom Van overberghe	Gene Bervoets	Drama	
Le huitième jour (The Eighth Day)	Jaco Van Dormael	Daniel Auteuil, Miou-Miou, Pascal Duquenne	Comedy-drama	Palme d'Or nominee at Cannes, Golden Globe Award for Best Foreign Language Film nominee
La promesse	Jean-Pierre Dardenne, Luc Dardenne	Olivier Gourmet	Social drama	
1997
Karakter (Character)	Mike van Diem	Jan Decleir, Fedja van Huêt, Victor Löw	Drama	Dutch-Belgian co-production; Academy Award for Best Foreign Language Film winner (representing the Netherlands)
Ma vie en rose (My Life in Pink)	Alain Berliner		Comedy-drama	Golden Globe Award for Best Foreign Language Film winner
1998
The Commissioner	George Sluizer			Entered into the 48th Berlin International Film Festival
Identity Pieces	Mweze Ngangura	Gérard Essomba, Dominique Mesa	Comedy	
Kirikou et la sorcière (Kirikou and the Sorceress)	Michel Ocelot		Animation	Belgian-French co-production
When the Light Comes	Stijn Coninx	Francesca Vanthielen, Joachim Król and Rick Engelkes	Adventure drama	Belgian-Dutch-German-Danish co-production
1999
Alien Adventure	Ben Stassen		Animation	IMAX film
A Dog of Flanders	Kevin Brodie	Jack Warden, Jesse James, Jon Voight, Cheryl Ladd	Family film	Belgian-American co-production; based on the novel by Marie Louise de la Ramée
Encounter in the Third Dimension	Ben Stassen, Sean MacLeod Phillips	Harry Shearer, Cassandra Peterson, Stuart Pankin	Science fiction film	IMAX film; followed by Misadventures in 3D
Molokai: The Story of Father Damien	Paul Cox	David Wenham, Kate Ceberano, Derek Jacobi, Sam Neill, Kris Kristofferson, Tom Wilkinson, Peter O'Toole, Jan Decleir	Biographical drama	Australian-Belgian-Dutch co-production; based on the life of Jozef De Veuster, aka Father Damien
Rosetta	Jean-Pierre Dardenne, Luc Dardenne	Émilie Dequenne, Olivier Gourmet	Social drama	Won the Palme d'Or at Cannes
Shades	Erik Van Looy	Mickey Rourke, Jan Decleir	Drama	
