= List of 2007 box office number-one films in Belgium =

This is a list of films which have placed number one at the weekend box office in Belgium and Luxembourg during 2007.

== Number-one films ==
Ben X became the highest grossing film of 2007, despite not reaching #1 during the year.

#	Weekend End Date	Film	Total Weekend Gross	Notes
1	January 7, 2007	Happy Feet	$5,008,579	
2	January 14, 2007	The Departed	$2,331,170	
3	January 21, 2007	The Departed	$2,113,353	
4	January 28, 2007	Blood Diamond	$2,269,315	
5	February 4, 2007	Rocky Balboa	$2,201,912	
6	February 11, 2007	The Pursuit of Happyness	$2,186,628	
7	February 18, 2007	Night at the Museum	$3,357,497	
8	February 25, 2007	Night at the Museum	$4,788,157	
9	March 4, 2007	Night at the Museum	$2,682,734	
10	March 11, 2007	Night at the Museum	$1,950,094	
11	March 18, 2007	Night at the Museum	$1,618,502	
12	March 25, 2007	300	$2,108,062	
13	April 1, 2007	300	$1,999,270	
14	April 8, 2007	Mr. Bean's Holiday	$2,428,628	
15	April 15, 2007	Mr. Bean's Holiday	$2,098,750	
16	April 22, 2007	Mr. Bean's Holiday	$1,597,457	
17	April 29, 2007	Next	$1,066,696	
18	May 6, 2007	Spider-Man 3	$2,477,762	
19	May 13, 2007	Spider-Man 3	$2,526,661	
20	May 20, 2007	Spider-Man 3	$3,564,118	
21	May 27, 2007	Pirates of the Caribbean: At World's End	$4,276,104	
22	June 3, 2007	Pirates of the Caribbean: At World's End	$2,241,902	
23	June 10, 2007	Pirates of the Caribbean: At World's End	$1,683,376	
24	June 17, 2007	Ocean's Thirteen	$1,851,560	
25	June 24, 2007	Shrek the Third	$3,503,806	
26	July 1, 2007	Shrek the Third	$2,673,867	
27	July 8, 2007	Live Free or Die Hard	$2,920,375	
28	July 15, 2007	Harry Potter and the Order of the Phoenix	$4,310,482	
29	July 22, 2007	Harry Potter and the Order of the Phoenix	$3,184,695	
30	July 29, 2007	The Simpsons Movie	$5,072,384	
31	August 5, 2007	Ratatouille	$2,913,150	
32	August 12, 2007	Ratatouille	$4,184,668	
33	August 19, 2007	Ratatouille	$3,741,564	
34	August 26, 2007	Ratatouille	$2,595,014	
35	September 2, 2007	Ratatouille	$2,665,110	
36	September 9, 2007	Ratatouille	$1,822,275	
37	September 16, 2007	The Bourne Ultimatum	$1,920,112	
38	September 23, 2007	The Bourne Ultimatum	$1,634,249	
39	September 30, 2007	The Bourne Ultimatum	$2,527,733	
40	October 7, 2007	The Bourne Ultimatum	$1,891,610	
41	October 14, 2007	Knocked Up	$1,945,208	
42	October 21, 2007	Rush Hour 3	$2,334,526	
43	October 28, 2007	Stardust	$2,737,596	
44	November 4, 2007	Vermist (Missing Persons)	$4,793,071	
45	November 11, 2007	Vermist (Missing Persons)	$2,561,285	
46	November 18, 2007	American Gangster	$2,267,897	
47	November 25, 2007	Beowulf	$2,731,307	
48	December 2, 2007	Beowulf	$2,356,929	
49	December 9, 2007	The Golden Compass	$2,377,278	
50	December 16, 2007	Bee Movie	$2,190,575	
51	December 23, 2007	I Am Legend	$3,334,264	
52	December 30, 2007	I Am Legend	$5,374,114	

== Notes ==
- All films are American or British productions, except when stated otherwise.

== See also ==
- List of Belgian films - Belgian films by year

Preceded by Box office number-one films of 2006 (Belgium)	Box office number-one films of 2007 (Belgium); 2007	Succeeded by Box office number-one films of 2008 (Belgium)
