= List of protected heritage sites in Lessines =

This table shows an overview of the protected heritage sites in the Walloon town Lessines. This list is part of Belgium's national heritage.

| Object | Year/architect | Town/section | Address | Coordinates | Number^{?} | Image |
|---|---|---|---|---|---|---|
| Hôpital Notre-Dame à la Rose: buildings with outbuildings, farm outbuildings and old cemetery with religious monuments ^{(nl)} ^{(fr)} | | Lessen | place Alix du Rosoit | 50.712624°N 3.831438°E | 55023-CLT-0001-01 Info | Hôpital Notre-Dame à la Rose: gebouwen met bijgebouwen, boerderij met bijgebouwen en oude begraafplaats met religieuze monumenten |
| Church of Saint-Pierre ^{(nl)} ^{(fr)} | | Lessen | | 50.712246°N 3.831127°E | 55023-CLT-0002-01 Info | Kerk Saint-Pierre |
| plane tree ^{(nl)} ^{(fr)} | | Lessen | rue Saint-Pierre, n°19 | 50.710989°N 3.831349°E | 55023-CLT-0004-01 Info | |
| Estriverie Castle: Castle and outbuildings (facades and roofs) and bridge over the canal and the park ^{(nl)} ^{(fr)} | | Lessen | rue de Gages | 50.702907°N 3.878927°E | 55023-CLT-0005-01 Info | Kasteel van Estriverie: kasteel en bijgebouwen (gevels en daken) en brug over de grachten en het park |
| St. Martin's Church ^{(nl)} ^{(fr)} | | Lessen | | 50.730543°N 3.851261°E | 55023-CLT-0007-01 Info | Kerk Saint-Martin |
| Organs of the church Saint-Martin ^{(nl)} ^{(fr)} | | Lessen | | 50.720713°N 3.780657°E | 55023-CLT-0008-01 Info | |
| Church of Saint-Léger ^{(nl)} ^{(fr)} | | Lessen | | 50.694034°N 3.800498°E | 55023-CLT-0009-01 Info | |
| Rectory (facades and roofs) ^{(nl)} ^{(fr)} | | Lessen | place de Ghoy n°16 | 50.728341°N 3.810333°E | 55023-CLT-0012-01 Info | |
| The installations of mechanical boat loader ^{(nl)} ^{(fr)} | | Lessen | rue René Magritte, te Lessines | 50.713783°N 3.834385°E | 55023-CLT-0014-01 Info | De installaties van de mechanische bootlader |
| Ensemble of l'Hôpital Notre-Dame à la Rose, excluding the outbuildings of the farm, and the old cemetery with religious monuments, and also excluding the organ ^{(nl)} ^{(fr)} | | Lessen | | 50.713102°N 3.831544°E | 55023-PEX-0001-01 Info | Ensemble de l'Hôpital Notre-Dame à la Rose, uitgezonderd de bijgebouwen van de boerderij, en de oude begraafplaats met religieuze monumenten, uitgesloten is het orgel |

== See also ==
- List of protected heritage sites in Hainaut (province)
- Lessines
