= Francis De Smet =

Belgian film producer

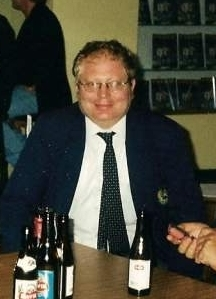
- Born: 3 December 1963 (age 62); Bruges, Belgium
- Occupations: film producer, music supervisor

Francis De Smet (born 3 December 1963) is a Belgian film producer. He was born in Bruges.

== Films ==
La Vie sexuelle des Belges 1950-1978 (1994) with Noël Godin; Camping Cosmos (1996) with Lolo Ferrari; The Closing Down of the Renault Factory at Vilvoorde Belgium (1998) with Louis Schweitzer; La Vie politique des Belges (2002) with Benoît Poelvoorde; Les vacances de Noël (2005) with Yolande Moreau; all with director Jan Bucquoy.
