= List of 2009 box office number-one films in Belgium =

This is a list of films which have placed number one at the weekend box office in Belgium and Luxembourg during 2009.

== Number-one films ==
†	This implies the highest-grossing movie of the year.

#	Weekend End Date	Film	Total Weekend Gross	Notes
1	January 4, 2009	Madagascar: Escape 2 Africa	$3,791,939	Animated film
2	January 11, 2009	Yes Man	$2,438,501	
3	January 18, 2009	Yes Man	$2,759,372	
4	January 25, 2009	Revolutionary Road	$2,510,992	
5	February 1, 2009	Valkyrie	$2,708,506	
6	February 8, 2009	The Curious Case of Benjamin Button	$2,663,272	
7	February 15, 2009	The Curious Case of Benjamin Button	$2,890,008	
8	February 22, 2009	The Curious Case of Benjamin Button	$2,974,431	
9	March 1, 2009	Bolt	$4,132,579	Animated film
10	March 8, 2009	Watchmen	$2,565,213	
11	March 15, 2009	Marley and Me	$2,164,370	
12	March 22, 2009	Coco	$1,913,288	France
13	March 29, 2009	Duplicity	$2,147,401	
14	April 5, 2009	Knowing	$2,061,770	
15	April 12, 2009	Fast & Furious	$3,496,280	
16	April 19, 2009	Fast & Furious	$3,314,818	
17	April 26, 2009	Fast & Furious	$1,769,278	
18	May 3, 2009	X-Men Origins: Wolverine	$2,712,761	
19	May 10, 2009	X-Men Origins: Wolverine	$1,914,909	
20	May 17, 2009	Angels & Demons	$2,815,215	
21	May 24, 2009	Angels & Demons	$2,883,769	
22	May 31, 2009	Angels & Demons	$1,702,056	
23	June 7, 2009	Terminator Salvation	$2,401,124	
24	June 14, 2009	Terminator Salvation	$1,663,176	
25	June 21, 2009	The Proposal	$2,147,316	
26	June 28, 2009	Transformers: Revenge of the Fallen	$2,389,945	
27	July 5, 2009	Ice Age: Dawn of the Dinosaurs	$3,046,815	Animated film
28	July 12, 2009	Ice Age: Dawn of the Dinosaurs	$4,741,225	
29	July 19, 2009	Harry Potter and the Half Blood Prince	$5,768,666	
30	July 26, 2009	Harry Potter and the Half Blood Prince	$3,846,627	
31	August 2, 2009	Harry Potter and the Half Blood Prince	$3,964,838	
32	August 9, 2009	G.I. Joe: The Rise of Cobra	$2,631,379	
33	August 16, 2009	Harry Potter and the Half Blood Prince	$2,515,783	
34	August 23, 2009	Inglourious Basterds	$2,120,351	
35	August 30, 2009	Inglourious Basterds	$2,298,605	
36	September 6, 2009	Inglourious Basterds	$2,247,794	
37	September 13, 2009	Inglourious Basterds	$1,751,073	
38	September 20, 2009	The Final Destination	$1,647,959	
39	September 27, 2009	The Ugly Truth	$1,726,056	
40	October 4, 2009	District 9	$2,369,053	
41	October 11, 2009	Up	$3,511,861	Animated film
42	October 18, 2009	Up	$2,908,863	
43	October 25, 2009	Up	$2,922,648	
44	November 1, 2009	Michael Jackson's This Is It	$3,714,937	
45	November 8, 2009	Up	$4,947,638	
46	November 15, 2009	2012	$4,852,455	
47	November 22, 2009	The Twilight Saga: New Moon	$5,532,677	
48	November 29, 2009	The Twilight Saga: New Moon	$3,886,422	
49	December 6, 2009	The Twilight Saga: New Moon	$2,958,017	
50	December 13, 2009	Dossier K.	$2,810,456	Belgium
51	December 20, 2009	Avatar †	$3,856,229	
52	December 27, 2009	Avatar †	$6,219,519	

== See also ==
- List of Belgian films

== Notes ==
- All the films are North American or British productions, except as noted.
