= Underwear Museum =

Belgian tourist attraction

Coordinates: 50.845111°N 4.353224°E

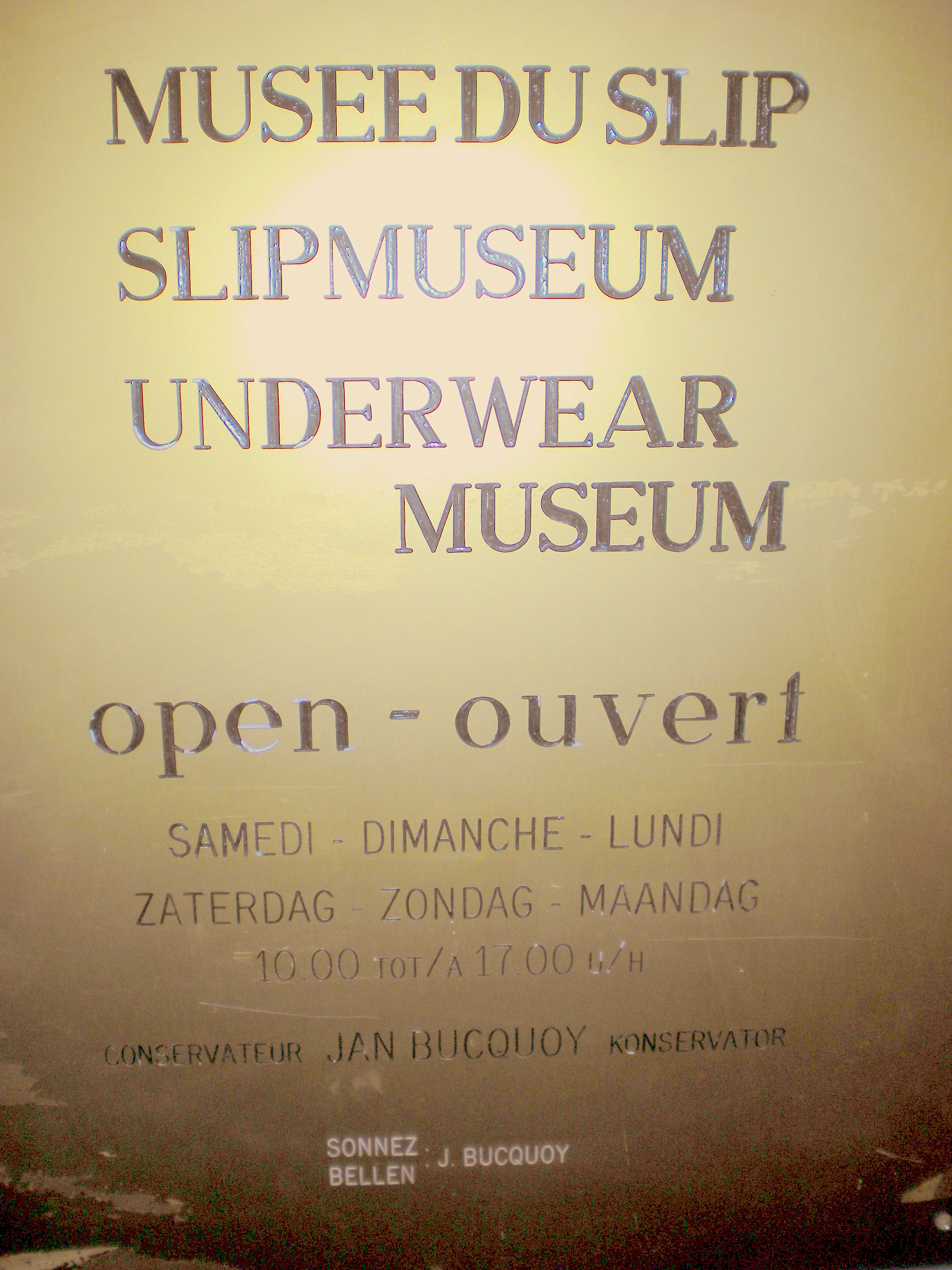
Underwear Museum sign in Brussels

The Underwear Museum (French: Musée du slip, Dutch: Slipmuseum) is a museum in Lessines, Hainaut, Wallonia, Belgium which displays the underclothing of famous persons; each article was worn at least one time by the person in question and is combined with a certificate of authenticity. It also has artistic depictions of famous people wearing underwear.

== History ==
It was established by Jan Bucquoy in 2009 in Brussels, and it was initially atop the café De Dolle Mol, in the City of Brussels municipality. Bucquoy stated that the end of hierarchy among humans was his motive for starting the museum. He explained, "If you are scared of someone, just imagine them in their underpants. The hierarchy will fall and you will see that this is a guy like any other. We are all equal, all brothers."

In 2014 Bruno Waterfield of The Telegraph stated that when the museum was in Brussels it was "a well-known drinking spot for Belgium's bohemian far-Left." Robyn Boyle of The Bulletin stated that the museum had become a household name in Brussels".

In 2014, the underwear of Yvan Mayeur was stolen from the museum.

In 2015, the lease on the café expired, and at one point the Flemish Community canceled its subsidy for the museum, causing Bucquoy to move it. The museum was housed in Chez Claude for a period before it moved to Lessines permanently in 2016. Prior to the relocation Mayeur donated a pair of underwear to the museum.

== Collection ==
The museum has underwear belonging to or attributed to belonging to Brigitte Lahaie, Mayeur, Michel Preud'homme, Didier Reynders, and Axelle Red.
