= Arno (singer) =

Belgian singer (1949–2022)

Arno Hintjens
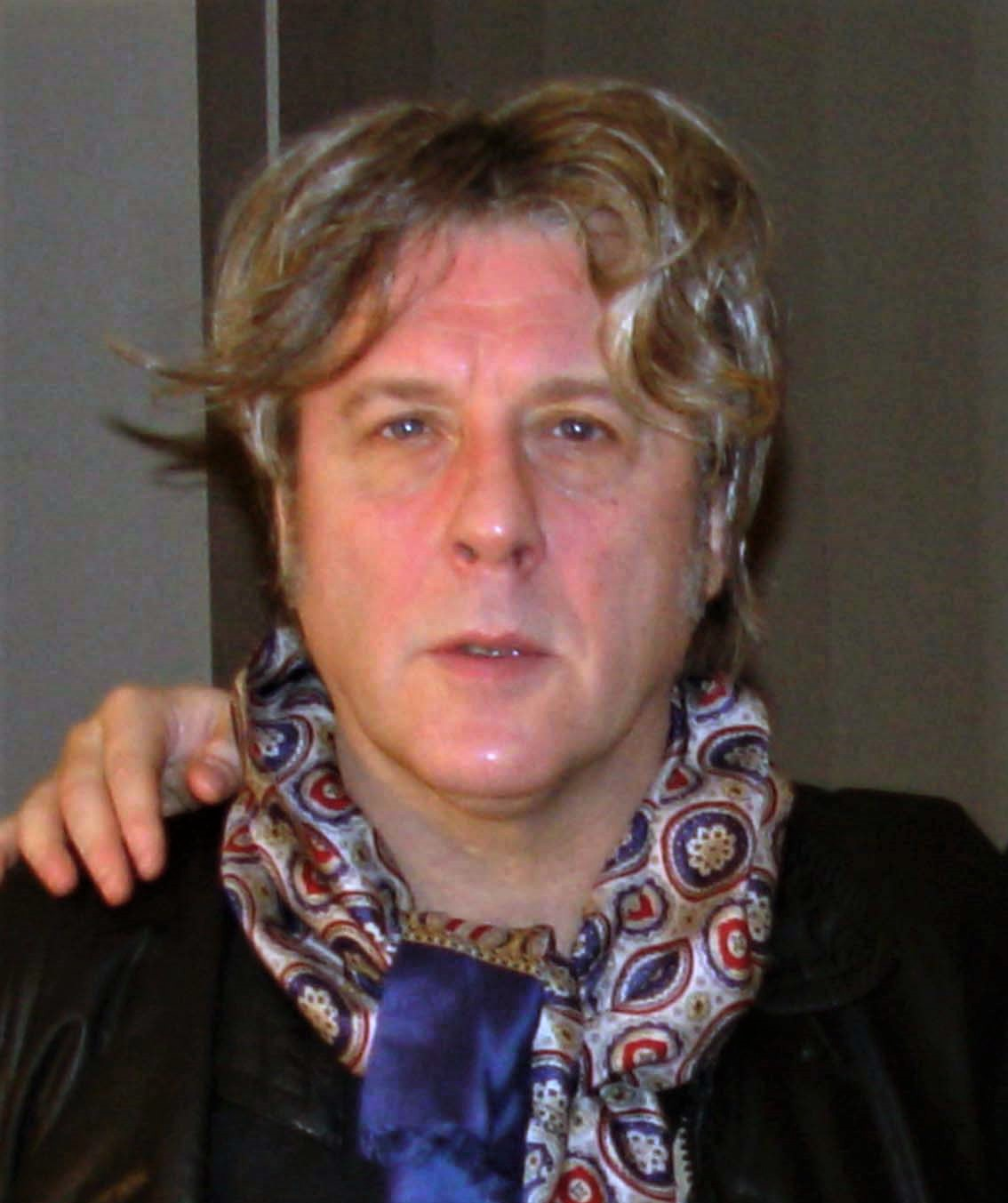
- Arno Hintjens in 2005
- Born: Arnold Charles Ernest Hintjens; 21 May 1949; Ostend, Belgium
- Died: 23 April 2022 (aged 72); Brussels, Belgium
- Other name: Arno
- Occupations: Singer, actor
- Known for: TC Matic

Arnold Charles Ernest Hintjens (21 May 1949 – 23 April 2022), better known by his stage name Arno, was a Belgian singer. He was the frontman of TC Matic, one of the best-known Belgian bands of the 1980s. After the band split in 1986 he enjoyed a solo career.

== Career ==
Arno sang in a mixture of English, French, Dutch and his native Ostend-Flemish dialect. For TC Matic, a band which achieved moderate artistic success throughout Europe, he wrote or co-wrote all the band's material, much of it together with guitarist and producer Jean-Marie Aerts. After going solo he released more than a dozen albums during a successful career. In 2002 he received the title "Chevalier des Arts et des Lettres" (Knight in the Arts and Literature) of the French government. A 2004 biography by Gilles Deleux was translated in Dutch as Een lach en een traan ("A Smile and a Tear").

In the Belgian film Camping Cosmos he played the homosexual lifeguard Harry who does not pay attention to Lolo Ferrari who is incarnating a caricature of Pamela Anderson.

At the beginning of 2020, Arno postponed his upcoming tour after being diagnosed with pancreatic cancer. Until the end of his life he was performing and recording music. Opex was his last record, recorded while he was very ill. He died from the disease on 23 April 2022, in Brussels, at the age of 72.

== Discography ==
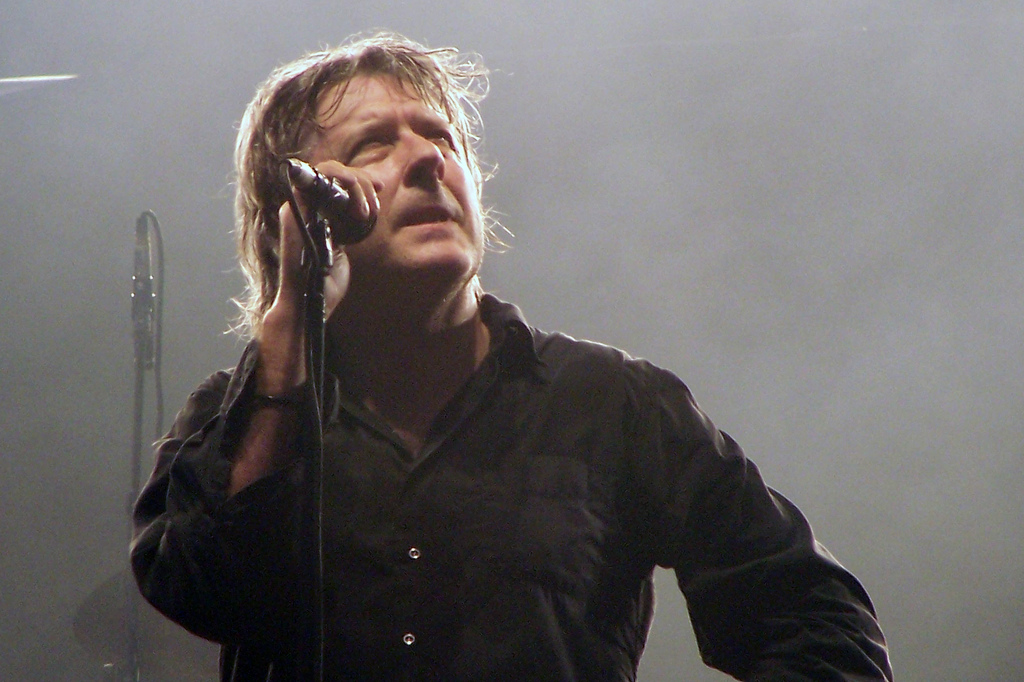
Arno, performing in 2005

=== Solo ===
- Arno (album) (1986)
- Charlatan (1988)
- Ratata (1990)
- Tracks From The Story (1992)
- Idiots Savants (1993)
- Water (1994) with the Subrovnicks
- À La Française (1995)
- Live À La Française (1997)
- Give Me The Gift (1997)
- European Cow Boy (1999)
- À Poil Commercial (1999)
- Le Best Of (2000)
- Arno Charles Ernest (2002)
- Longbox (2002)
- French Bazaar (2004)
- Live in Brussels (2005)
- Jus De Box (2007)
- Covers Cocktail (2008)
- Brussld (2010)
- Future Vintage (2012)
- Le coffret essentiel (2014)
- Human Incognito (2016)*'
- Santeboutique (2019)
- Vivre (2021)
- Opex (2022) (His last album was posthumously released)

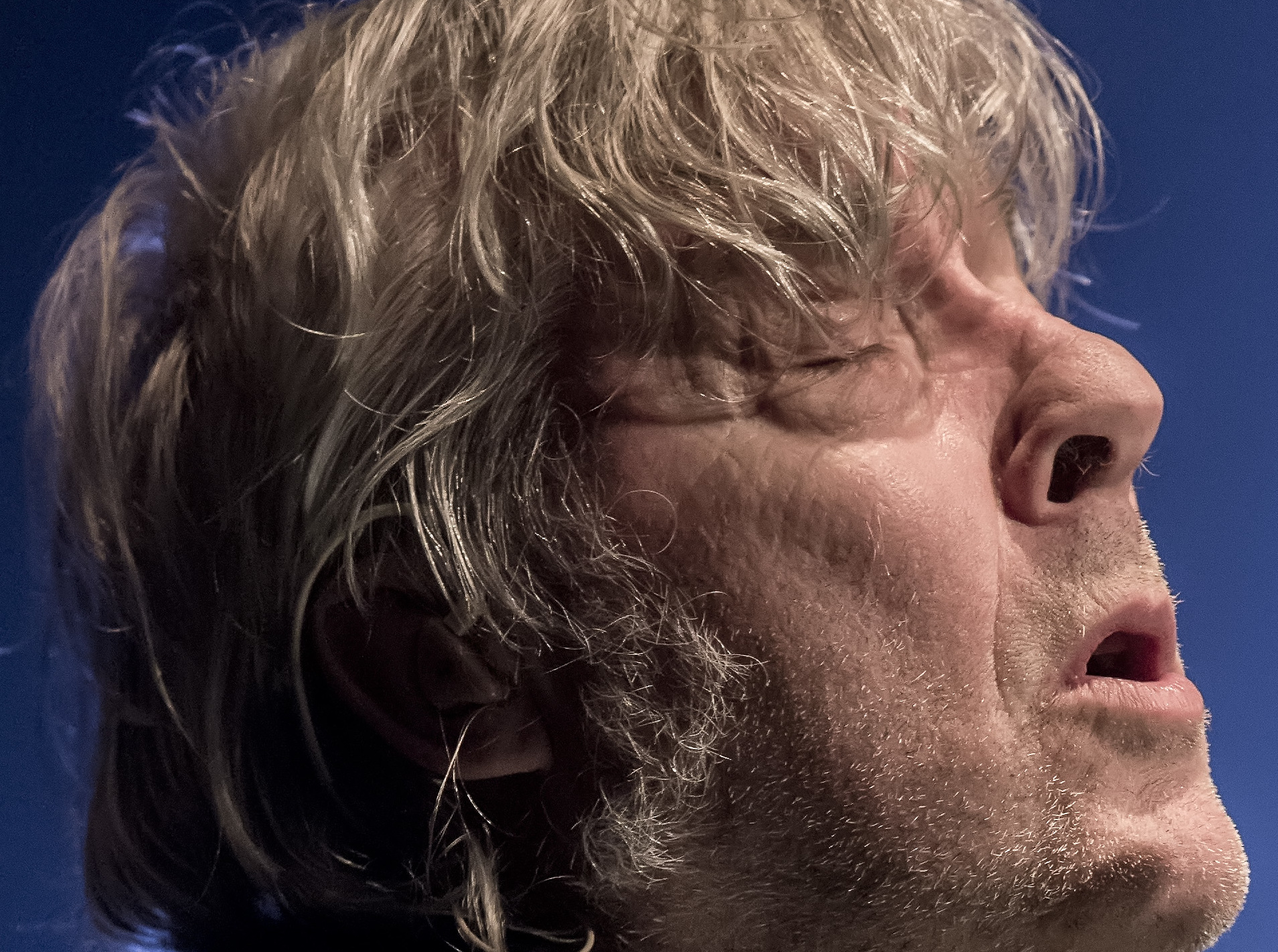
Arno during a concert in 2017

=== Freckleface ===
- Freckleface (1972)

=== With Tjens Couter ===
- Who Cares (1975)
- Plat Du Jour (1978)
- Singles 1975-1980 (1978)
- If It Blows (Let It Blow) (CD compilation, 1991)

=== With TC Matic ===
- TC Matic (1981)
- L'Apache (1982)
- Choco (1983)
- Yé Yé (1985)
- The Best Of (Ça Vient, Ça Vient, Change Pas Demain) (1986)
- Compil Complet! (2000)
- TC Matic - The Essential (2003)

=== As Charles ===
- Charles Et Les Lulus (1991) with Roland Vancampenhout, Adriano Cominotto and Piet Jorens.
- Charles and the White Trash European Blues Connection (1998)

== Filmography ==
- 1987: Skin (by Guido Henderickx) as Chico
- 1996: Camping Cosmos (by Jan Bucquoy) as Himself
- 1997: Alors voilà (by Michel Piccoli) as Himself
- 1999: Surveiller les tortues (Short, by Inès Rabadan) as André
- 2006: Komma (by Martine Doyen) as Peter De Wit / Lars Ericsson
- 2007: Ex Drummer (by Koen Mortier)
- 2007: Parade nuptiale (by Emma Perret)
- 2007: I Always Wanted to Be a Gangster (by Samuel Benchetrit) as Himself
- 2009: Petites vacances à Knokke-le-Zoute (TV Movie, by Yves Matthey) as Maurice
- 2014: Le goût des myrtilles (by Thomas De Thier) as Eric Dessart
- 2015: Prejudice (by Antoine Cuypers) as Alain (final film role)

== Honours ==
- Knight in the French Order of Arts and Letters: 2002
- Grand Prix du Disque for French Song (Charles Ernest): 2002
- Honorary citizen of Brussels: 2017
- Honorary citizen of Ostend: 2018
- Music Industry Awards Lifetime Achievement Award: 2019
- Ostend Film Festival Lifetime Achievement Award: 2022
- Officer in the Belgian Order of the Crown: 2022
