= List of 2008 box office number-one films in Belgium =

This is a list of films which have placed number one at the weekend box office in Belgium and Luxembourg during 2008.

== Number-one films ==
†	This implies the highest-grossing movie of the year.

#	Weekend End Date	Film	Total Weekend Gross	Notes
1	January 6, 2008	National Treasure: Book of Secrets	$5,237,576	
2	January 13, 2008	National Treasure: Book of Secrets	$2,759,589	
3	January 20, 2008	National Treasure: Book of Secrets	$2,899,175	
4	January 27, 2008	National Treasure: Book of Secrets	$2,371,980	
5	February 3, 2008	Astérix at the Olympic Games (Astérix aux jeux olympiques)	$3,744,744	Belgium/France/Germany/Italy/Spain
6	February 10, 2008	Astérix at the Olympic Games (Astérix aux jeux olympiques)	$4,911,641	
7	February 17, 2008	Astérix at the Olympic Games (Astérix aux jeux olympiques)	$2,820,884	
8	February 24, 2008	Jumper	$2,823,391	
9	March 2, 2008	Welcome to the Sticks (Bienvenue chez les Ch'tis)	$3,988,531	France
10	March 9, 2008	Welcome to the Sticks (Bienvenue chez les Ch'tis)	$3,776,270	
11	March 16, 2008	Welcome to the Sticks (Bienvenue chez les Ch'tis)	$3,823,405	
12	March 23, 2008	Welcome to the Sticks (Bienvenue chez les Ch'tis)	$4,274,902	
13	March 30, 2008	Welcome to the Sticks (Bienvenue chez les Ch'tis)	$4,906,836	
14	April 6, 2008	Welcome to the Sticks (Bienvenue chez les Ch'tis)	$4,676,129	
15	April 13, 2008	Welcome to the Sticks (Bienvenue chez les Ch'tis)	$2,693,739	
16	April 20, 2008	Welcome to the Sticks (Bienvenue chez les Ch'tis)	$2,139,702	
17	April 27, 2008	21	$1,384,532	
18	May 4, 2008	Iron Man	$3,204,581	
19	May 11, 2008	What Happens in Vegas	$965,022	
20	May 18, 2008	What Happens in Vegas	$1,926,287	
21	May 25, 2008	Indiana Jones and the Kingdom of the Crystal Skull	$2,805,681	
22	June 1, 2008	Indiana Jones and the Kingdom of the Crystal Skull	$2,211,084	
23	June 8, 2008	Indiana Jones and the Kingdom of the Crystal Skull	$2,400,892	
24	June 15, 2008	Indiana Jones and the Kingdom of the Crystal Skull	$2,411,228	
25	June 22, 2008	Indiana Jones and the Kingdom of the Crystal Skull	$1,885,429	
26	June 29, 2008	The Incredible Hulk	$1,951,213	
27	July 6, 2008	The Chronicles of Narnia: Prince Caspian	$2,936,231	
28	July 13, 2008	Kung Fu Panda	$4,702,170	
29	July 20, 2008	Kung Fu Panda	$4,166,355	
30	July 27, 2008	The Dark Knight	$2,414,850	
31	August 3, 2008	WALL-E	$3,473,279	
32	August 10, 2008	WALL-E	$3,340,964	
33	August 17, 2008	The Mummy: Tomb of the Dragon Emperor	$3,421,243	
34	August 24, 2008	The Mummy: Tomb of the Dragon Emperor	$3,056,349	
35	August 31, 2008	Babylon A.D.	$2,122,017	
36	September 7, 2008	Get Smart	$2,210,375	
37	September 14, 2008	Mamma Mia!	$2,252,283	
38	September 21, 2008	Mamma Mia!	$1,710,343	
39	September 28, 2008	Mamma Mia!	$1,701,719	
40	October 5, 2008	Mamma Mia!	$2,495,791	
41	October 12, 2008	Mamma Mia!	$1,796,153	
42	October 19, 2008	Anubis: Het pad der 7 zonden	$2,183,394	Belgium/Netherlands
43	October 26, 2008	Loft †	$3,063,571	Belgium
44	November 2, 2008	Loft †	$5,236,653	
45	November 9, 2008	Quantum of Solace	$3,923,688	
46	November 16, 2008	Quantum of Solace	$2,987,445	
47	November 23, 2008	Loft †	$2,272,209	
48	November 30, 2008	Loft †	$2,327,519	
49	December 7, 2008	Madagascar: Escape 2 Africa	$2,526,282	
50	December 14, 2008	Madagascar: Escape 2 Africa	$2,688,835	
51	December 21, 2008	Madagascar: Escape 2 Africa	$3,140,792	
52	December 28, 2008	Madagascar: Escape 2 Africa	$4,851,253	

== Notes ==
- All the films are North American or British productions, except when stated differently.

== See also ==
- List of Belgian films - Belgian films by year
