= Deux-Acren =

Village in Belgium

Coordinates: 50°44′N 3°51′E

Deux-Acren is a village of Wallonia and a district of the municipality of Lessines, located in the province of Hainaut, Belgium.

== History ==
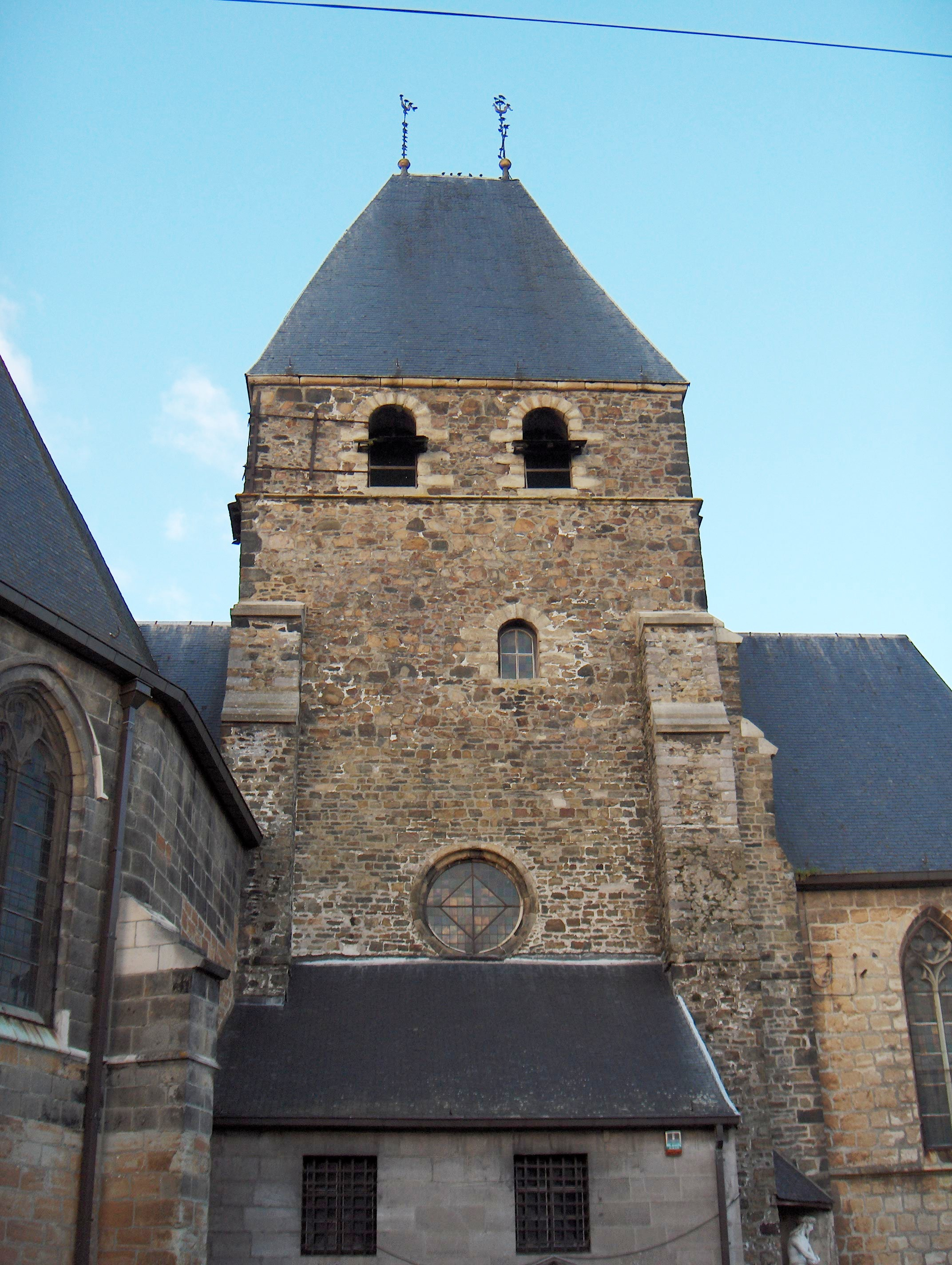
Church

In 1270 the name in Akeren was used. On a map from 1540 the village was called Okeren.

The municipality Deux-Acren was created in 1804 by merging the two villages Acren-Saint-Martin and Acren-Saint-Géréon.

The parishes merged in 1828 and the church of Saint Martin became the new church of the parish. The church of Saint Gereon was demolished in the 19th century to make way for a churchyard.

Deux-Acren remained a municipality until the fusion of the Belgian municipalities in 1977 when it was added to the town of Lessines.
