= Jim Loves Jack =

- Directed by: David Adkin
- Starring: Jim Egan; Jack Nesbit
- Cinematography: Ali Kazimi
- Edited by: Ricardo Acosta
- Distributed by: Vtape
- Release date: January 19, 1996
- Running time: 52 minutes
- Country: Canada
- Language: English

Jim Loves Jack is a Canadian documentary film, directed by David Adkin. The film stars Jim Egan and his life partner Jack Nesbit. The film had its theatrical premiere in Toronto on January 19, 1996.

== Synopsis ==
The film is a documentary about Jim Egan and John Norris Nesbit, a same-sex couple who were at the centre of the landmark Supreme Court of Canada case Egan v. Canada, which established sexual orientation as a prohibited basis of discrimination under the Canadian Charter of Rights and Freedoms. Egan also had a longer history as an activist, having been Canada's first prominent LGBT rights activist in the 1950s and 1960s before retreating into a quieter domestic life with the more publicity-averse Nesbit.

Egan recalls in the film that during the 1940s and 1950s, "there was a conspiracy of silence in the legitimate media about homosexual issues. At the same time, seedy tabloids would write about the queers and pansies the police would routinely round up each weekend in the city's gay districts." The film highlights Egan's 15-year campaign that challenged journalists, politicians, and religious institutions, protesting against the negative homosexual stereotypes portrayed in the tabloids and the harassment and witch-hunts conducted by authorities.

== Release ==
The film had its theatrical premiere in Toronto on January 19, 1996. It was screened at various documentary and LGBT film festivals, and had television broadcasts on VisionTV and Knowledge Network.

== Reception ==
A Booklist review called the film a "prejudice-shattering portrait – that uses photos, old home movies, period footage, and tributes from the gay community that are seamlessly blended in an admirable tribute to a genuine gay-rights pioneer; this biography is not about polemics; rather, it is an attempt to find respectability and acceptance." The Library Journal said Adkin "intimately portrays Jim and Jack's 50-year relationship as domestic partners, ending with the case in the Canadian Supreme Court that strove to recognize their relationship as a legal union" and that "their personal story and parallel public fight for equality is a compelling one."

Judy Oxenham wrote in Visual Media that "the film shows Jim Egan to be the most unlikely of political activists, devoted to his family and friends, home, garden and pets. For those who expect something salacious, go elsewhere. I found it brought strongly to mind the 1984 National Film Board of Canada documentary Democracy on Trial: The Morgentaler Affair, in its portrayal of one man's challenge to our so-called democratic processes and his constant struggle with the death-hold of a frequently cruel and unsparing media."

The Globe and Mail wrote in their reviews that it is a "remarkable film that casts an appreciative eye on the lean, bearded Egan's lifelong gay activism, starting with the bold letter-writing campaign he launched in postwar Toronto against what he calls the gutter press". They also pointed out how "it reveals much about those years when gay men and women were reviled in the establishment press. It's also a marvellous, poignant and enlightening film."

== See also ==
- List of LGBTQ-related films
- List of LGBTQ rights activists
- List of LGBT firsts by year
- List of years in LGBT rights
