= Jim Egan (activist) =

Canadian activist and writer

- Born: James Egan; September 14, 1921; Toronto, Ontario, Canada
- Died: March 9, 2000 (aged 78); Courtenay, British Columbia, Canada
- Occupation: Owner of a biological specimen business
- Known for: Egan v Canada; LGBT rights activism

James Egan (September 14, 1921 – March 9, 2000) was a Canadian LGBT rights activist known for his role in the landmark Supreme Court of Canada case Egan v. Canada. He is considered Canada's first prominent LGBT activist, due to his initial period of activism from 1949 to 1964.

== Early life ==
Born and raised in Toronto, Ontario, Egan realized he was gay at a young age. He met John Norris "Jack" Nesbit, his lifelong partner, in 1948.

== Early activism ==
Professionally, Egan was self-employed as the owner of a biological specimen business, and so felt able to speak out without risk of losing his job, a fear that kept many other LGBT people in that era in the closet.

Beginning in 1949, Egan wrote hundreds of letters, articles, and op-ed pieces to magazines and newspapers advocating equal rights for and criticizing inaccurate portrayals of lesbian and gay people, and to politicians, advocating for fairer treatment of lesbians and gays under the law. His letters appeared in daily and weekly newspapers, and in magazines such as Saturday Night and Time. His article "I Am a Homosexual", was published under a pseudonym in the tabloid Sir! in 1951. In another article in 1954 published in the tabloid Justice Weekly, he declared "The acceptance and integration that every thinking, responsible homosexual desires will come some day." By 1963, he was being published in mainstream publications, writing under his real name in the Toronto Daily Star that "[t]he homosexual is the sole remaining minority who can be sneered at, reviled, libeled, and spat upon with virtual impunity."

In 1964, he was prominently featured in Sydney Katz's "The Homosexual Next Door", a Maclean's article which was the most positive portrayal of homosexuality ever to appear in a mainstream Canadian publication up to that time; even though Egan appeared in the article under a pseudonym, Nesbit — a more private person who was uncomfortable with Egan's public visibility – demanded that Egan give up his activism if he wanted to continue their relationship.

== Move to British Columbia ==
Although Egan initially refused and the couple broke up, Egan soon decided that he wanted to reunite with Nesbit and dropped his activist pursuits. Egan and Nesbit moved to Vancouver Island in 1964, starting their own business. Egan was also active in local politics, serving as a representative for Electoral Area B (Comox North) on the Comox-Strathcona Regional District board from 1981 to 1993.

== Supreme Court case ==
Having reached retirement age, Egan began collecting Canada Pension Plan benefits in 1986, and applied for spousal benefits for Nesbit the following year. The couple would actually have been better off financially if they collected separate individual pensions, but chose the spousal benefits route as they felt their situation would make a strong test case for the legal rights of same-sex couples. After the spousal benefits were denied, they took the case to court; following losses at the Federal Court in 1991 and the Federal Court of Appeal in 1993, the case reached the Supreme Court in 1994. The case was argued before the Supreme Court on November 1 of that year.

The Supreme Court ruled on May 25, 1995. The court ruled against Egan on the issue of spousal benefits, finding that the restriction of such benefits to heterosexual couples was a justified infringement because the core purpose of such benefits was to provide financial support to women who had spent their lives raising children rather than in paid employment — however, they ruled unanimously to include sexual orientation as a prohibited grounds of discrimination under the Canadian Charter of Rights and Freedoms. The latter ruling was seen as a significant victory for LGBT rights in Canada despite the loss on the benefits issue itself, setting the stage for later successes in the courts; it came to be cited as a key precedent in important later court decisions such as M. v. H., Vriend v. Alberta, Little Sisters Book and Art Emporium v. Canada, and Halpern v. Canada, the decision that ultimately led to the legalization of same-sex marriage in Canada.

== Later life ==
Egan and Nesbit were subsequently named as grand marshals of Toronto's 1995 Pride Parade. The following year, they were the subjects of David Adkin's documentary film Jim Loves Jack. Egan published the memoir Challenging the Conspiracy of Silence: My Life as a Canadian Gay Activist in 1998, with the assistance of University of Toronto librarian Don McLeod who edited and compiled the volume. In the same year, a portrait of Egan by artist Andrew McPhail was added to The ArQuives' National Portrait Collection in honour of his role as a significant builder of LGBT history in Canada.

Egan died of lung cancer on March 9, 2000, at his home in Courtenay, British Columbia. His partner, Jack Nesbit, died three months later.

Egan is the subject of the first Heritage Minute on an LGBTQ2 theme, released in 2018.
