= Camping Cosmos =

- Theatrical release poster
- Directed by: Jan Bucquoy
- Written by: Jan Bucquoy
- Produced by: Francis De Smet
- Starring: Lolo Ferrari; Noël Godin; Arno Hintjens; Jan Decleir; Herman Brusselmans
- Cinematography: Michel Baudour
- Edited by: Matyas Veress
- Music by: Serge Gainsbourg; Vera Lynn; George Gershwin
- Distributed by: Transatlantic Films Brussels
- Release date: 1996
- Running time: 88 minutes
- Country: Belgium
- Language: French

Camping Cosmos is a 1996 Belgian satirical comedy film and a sequel to La Vie sexuelle des Belges 1950-1978, directed by the same director: Jan Bucquoy. It stars Claude Semal, Lolo Ferrari (Miss Vandeputte), Noël Godin (Pierre Mertens), Herman Brusselmans (Herman) and Arno (Harry).

The movie's tagline is: Revolution, football, beer and frites. It is an unconventional and non-conformist story of the sexual habits of Belgians. Cosmos refers to the eternity of heaven in full contrast with this little campsite where so many people live together with their problems and limited view of the world. It also refers to the Russian cosmonauts who explored space, but who as communists did not believe in an afterworld. And last, the name of this Campsite Cosmos is referring to the sky without limit above the heads of its residents. The picture became a cult film.

== Plot ==
Miss Vandeputte (Lolo Ferrari) and Mister Vandeputte, owners of Camping Cosmos

In the summer of 1986, on a campsite on the Belgian coast where everybody wants to live in complete freedom and forget the obligations of everyday life, Jan Bucquoy, the delegate of the Ministry of Culture, must bring culture nearer to the working class. He presents things like Bertolt Brecht's play, Mother Courage and Her Children, or an interview with the famous writer Pierre Mertens, but the vacationers at this caravan park are more interested in low-brow distractions, like soccer, boxing matches or beauty contests, as well as sexual adventures and temporary romances. One of the actors is dressed up to resemble Tintin.

== Cast ==
- Jean-Henri Compère as Jan Bucquoy
- Fanny Hanciaux as Eve Bucquoy
- Lolo Ferrari as Mme Vandeputte
- Jean-Paul Dermont as M. Vandeputte
- Noe Francq (credited as Noé Francq) as Noé Vandeputte
- Claude Semal as Claude Semal dit Tintin
- Noël Godin as Pierre Mertens
- Jacques Calonne as Jacques Calonne
- Arno Hintjens (credited as Arno Hintjens Hintjens) as Arno
- Herman Brusselmans as Herman
- Jan Decleir as friend of Arno
- Patricia Dollez as Mme Janssens
- Sabrina Leurquin as Ulrique, la terroriste
- Catherine Claeys as Giselle Crapaud
- Isabelle Legros as Isabelle Legros
- Jean Pierre Coopman

== Production ==
The production was entirely in the hands of Transatlantic Films and its director Francis De Smet. Because of the refusal of the Flemish Government to raise the capital fund of the equivalent of 200.000 Euro at that time, the film had a substantial delay and was not ready in time for the Cannes Film Festival of 1996. This had consequences for the release later in Belgium. The film could not be released before 1997 in Paris.

== Reception ==
The film was at the origin of a controversy about the policy of Flemish state subsidizing films not least because of the presence of main actress Lolo Ferrari.
