= Castle of l'Estriverie =

Castle in Hainaut, Wallonia, Belgium

- Wallonia, Belgium
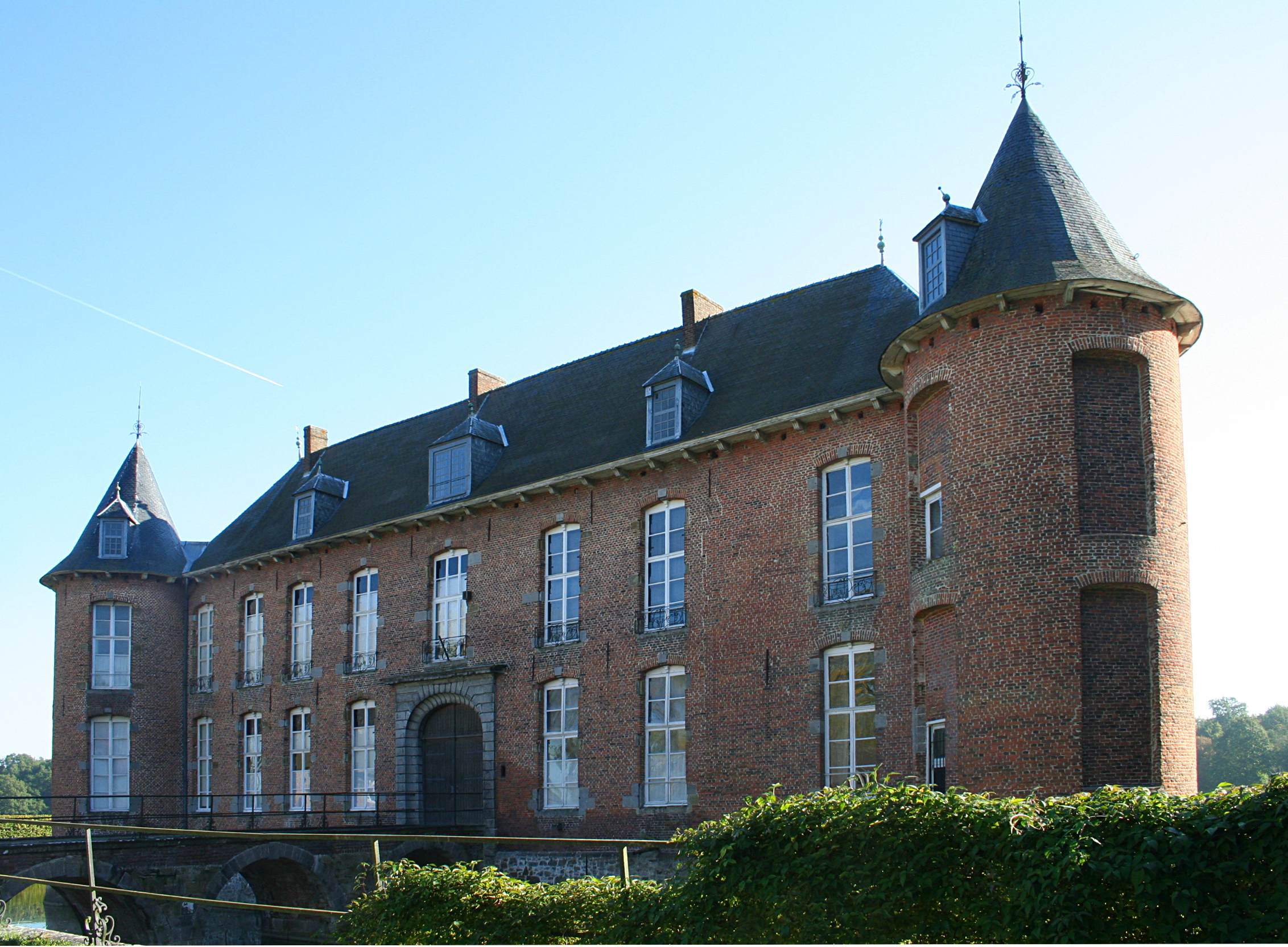

Site information
- Type: Castle

Location
- Coordinates: 50.7028°N 3.8790°E

Castle of l'Estriverie (French: Château de l'Estriverie) is a castle in Bois-de-Lessines, a village in Lessines, Hainaut, Wallonia, Belgium.

== History ==
In 1324 the castle estate was declared a fief by the Counts of Hainaut and granted to Gérard de Lestruve. The estate was passed on to Hoste d'Ecaussinnes and in 1440 to the Despretz de Quievrain family who kept it until 1483. One of this family, Watier de Quivrains, erected a castle here in 1454. It is on the foundations of this old castle that the current building stands.

In 1483 the estate passed by marriage to the Cottrel family, who kept the castle for seven generations. This family did most of the restoring and rebuilding in the 16th and 17th century, and turned the fortified medieval dwelling into a graceful château.

In 1727, the estate became the property of Marie Spinola, the last niece of the Cottrel family. She gave it to her son, who sold the estate in 1756 to Joseph Antoine de Wautier. The court of Hainault however overturned the sale and transferred the castle to Jean Philippe d'Yve, Viscount of Bavay.

== See also ==
- List of castles in Belgium
