= Lessines =

City in Hainaut Province, Wallonia, Belgium

Lessines Lissene (Picard): Lessen (Dutch)
- Municipality
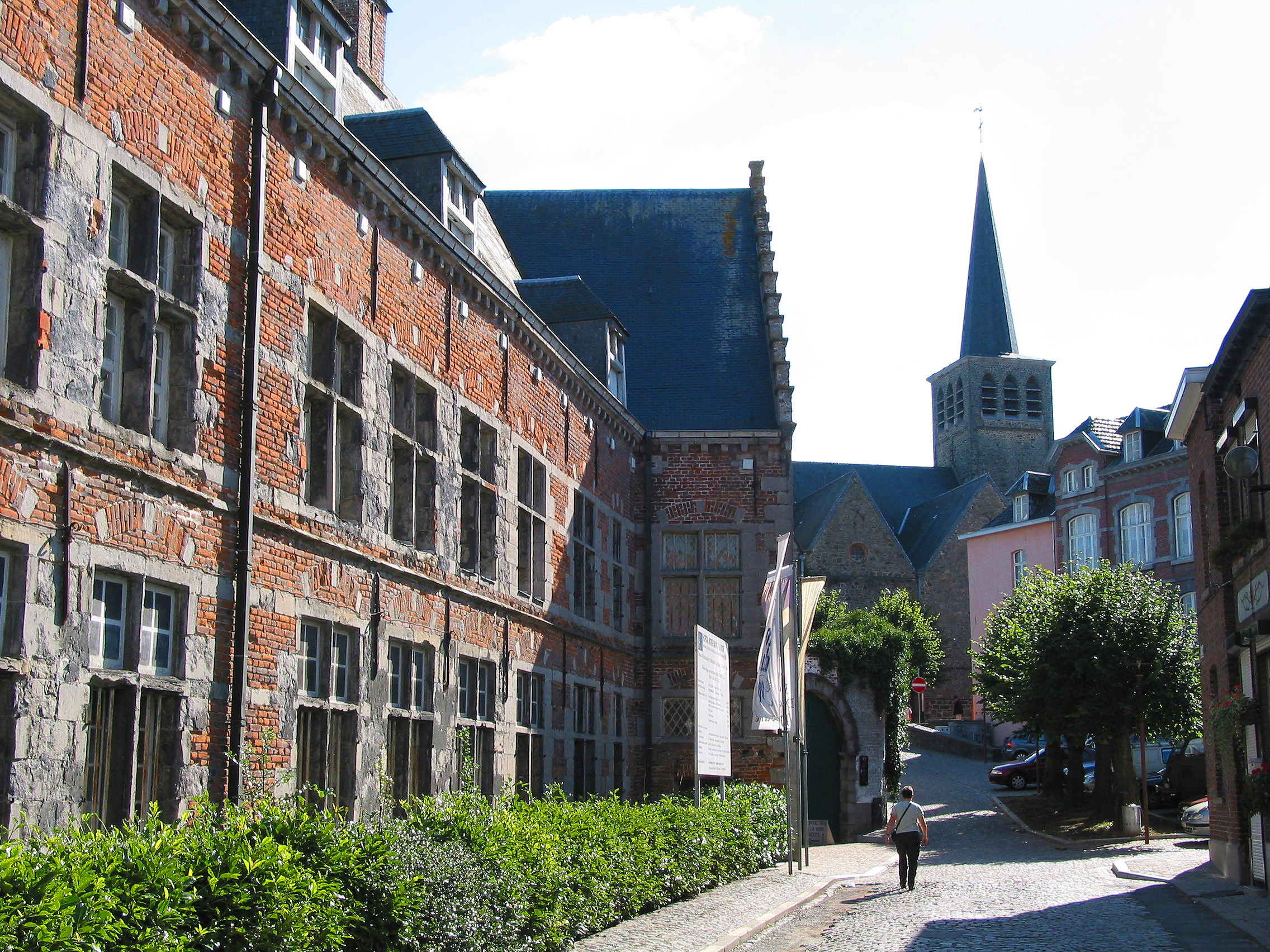

- Flag Coat of arms

- Location of Lessines in Hainaut
- Interactive map of Lessines
- Location in Belgium
- Coordinates: 50°43′N 03°50′E
- Country: Belgium
- Community: French Community
- Region: Wallonia
- Province: Hainaut
- Arrondissement: Ath

Government
  - Mayor: Pascal De Handschutter (PS)
  - Governing party: PS - ENSEMBLE (MR) - OSER cdH

Area
  - Total: 72.67 km^{2} (28.06 sq mi)

Population (2018-01-01)
  - Total: 18,552
  - Density: 255.3/km^{2} (661.2/sq mi)
- Postal codes: 7860 Lessines; 7861 Papignies; 7861 Wannebecq; 7862 Ogy; 7863 Ghoy; 7864 Deux-Acren; 7866 Bois-de-Lessines; 7866 Ollignies
- NIS code: 51069
- Area codes: 068
- Website: www.lessines.be

Lessines (French: [lɛsin]; Picard: Lissene; Walloon: Lissene; Dutch: Lessen [ˈlɛsə(n)]) is a city and municipality of Wallonia located in the province of Hainaut, Belgium. As of the 2014 census, The municipality's total population was 18,637. The total area is 72.29 km^{2} (27.91 sq mi) which gives a population density of 247 inhabitants per km^{2}.

The municipality consists of the following districts: Bois-de-Lessines, Deux-Acren, Ghoy, Lessines, Ogy, Ollignies, Papignies, and Wannebecq.

Lessines is a municipality of Picardy Wallonia. It is primarily known as the birthplace of the surrealist painter René Magritte.

== History ==
=== Postal history ===
The Lessines post office opened before 1830. It used postal code 71 with bars (before 1864), and 214 with points before 1874. Deux-Acren post office opened on 15 May 1866. It used postal code 104 with points before 1874. The Papignies post office opened on 18 February 1880, Ghoy and Ollignies on 25 May 1905, and Ogy on 5 November 1907.

Postal codes in 1969: 7850 Ollignies - 7851 Bois-de-Lessines - 7860 Lessines - 7861 Papignies - 7862 Ogy - 7863 Ghoy - 7870 Deux-Acren

Postal codes since at least 1990: 7860 Lessines - 7861 Papignies, Wannebecq (not opened in 1969) - 7862 Ogy - 7863 Ghoy - 7864 Deux-Acren - 7866 Bois-de-Lessines, Ollignies

== Culture ==
The Underwear Museum, created by Jan Bucquoy, is in Lessines; it moved from Brussels to Lessines in 2016.

Lessines is home to the Hôpital Notre-Dame à la Rose (The Hospital of Our Lady with the Rose), a tentative World Heritage site, founded in 1242 and considered one of the oldest hospital complexes in Europe. Originally created to care for the poor, pilgrims, and the sick, it functioned for centuries and remains exceptionally well preserved. Today, it stands as an important historical site, offering insight into medieval healthcare, religious life, and charitable traditions.

The town is also known as the birthplace of René Magritte, a leading figure in Surrealism.

the Castle of l'Estriverie is also located in Lessines

== Gallery ==
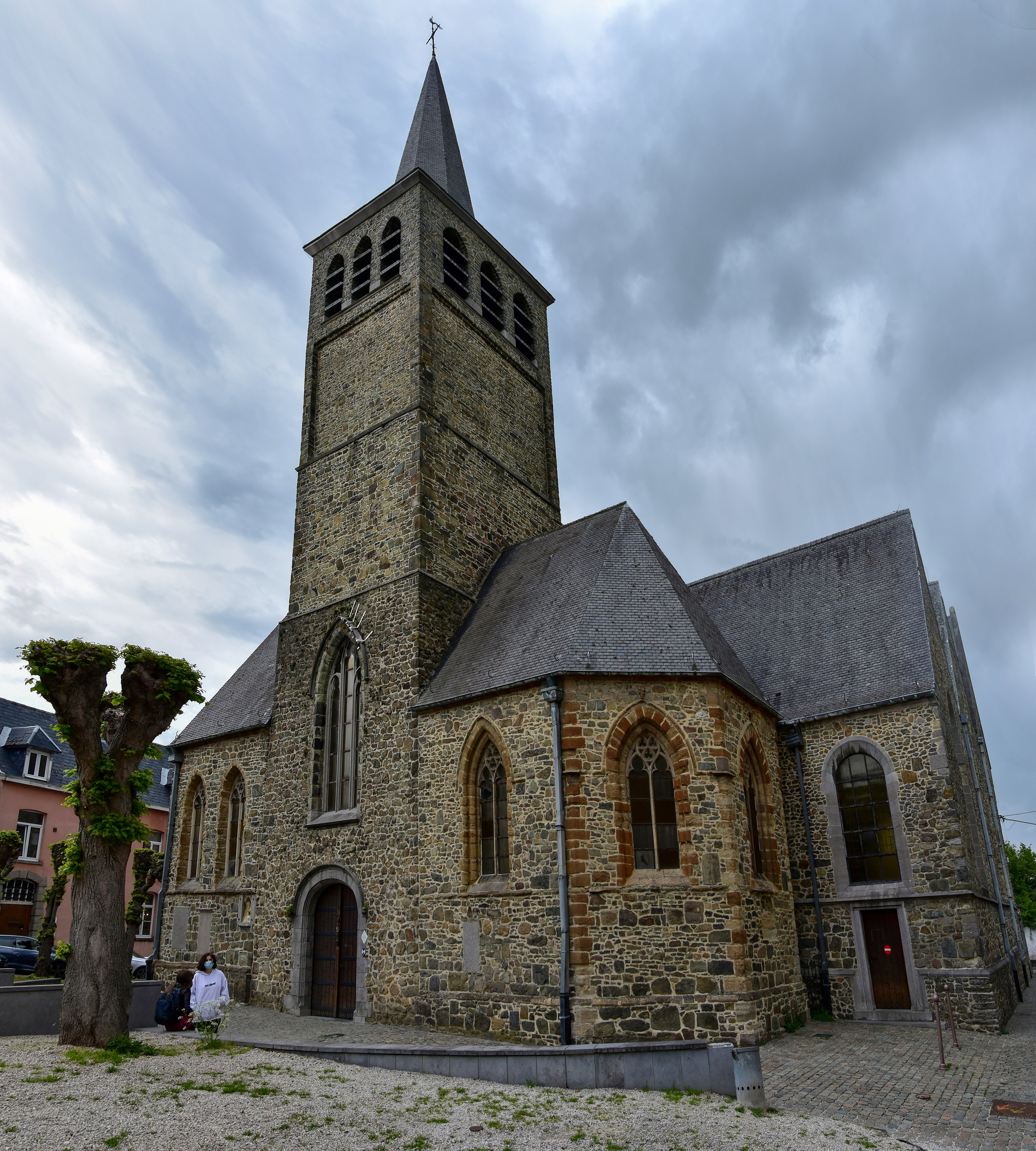
Church of St. Peter

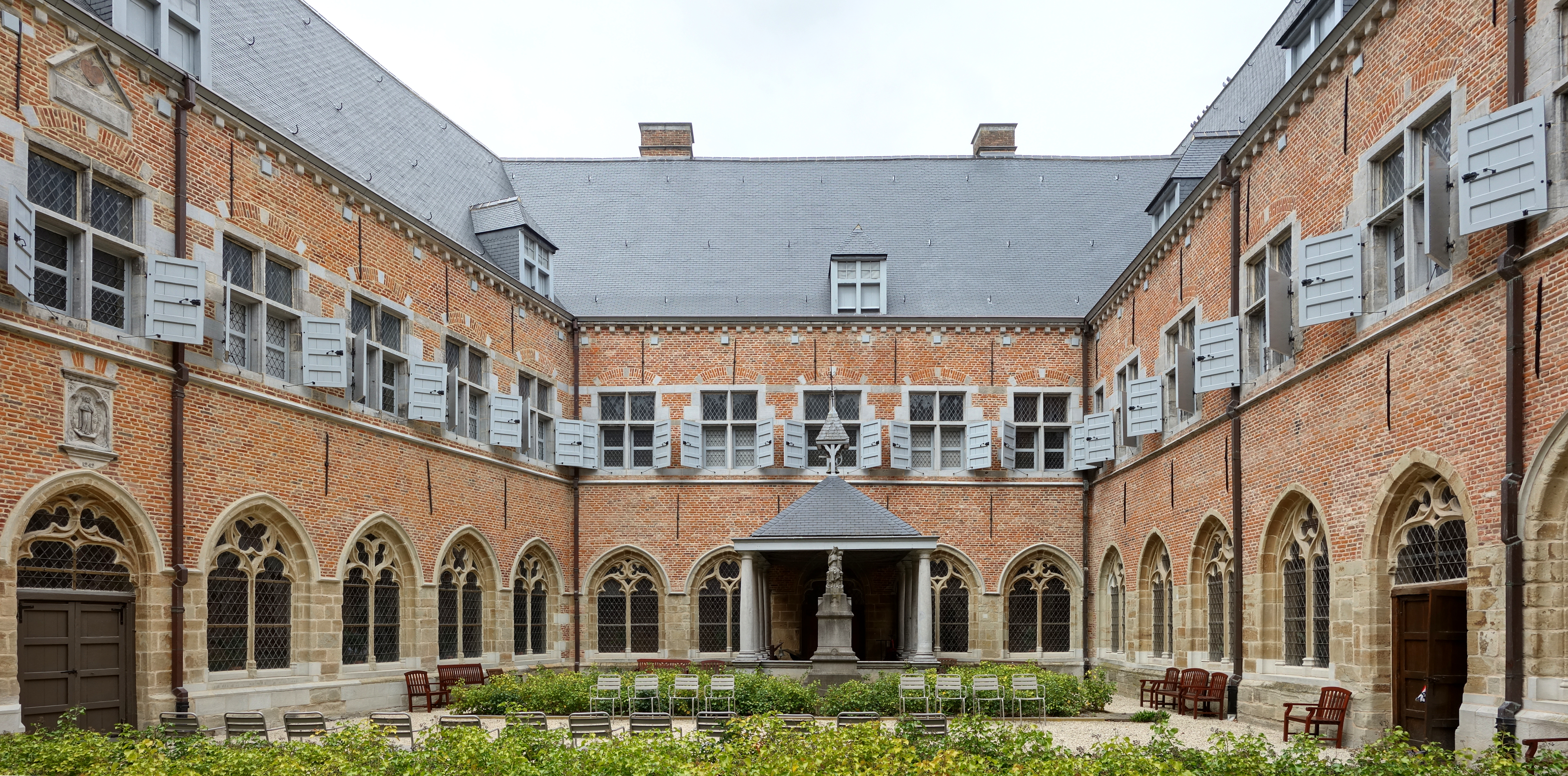
Hôpital Notre-Dame à la Rose ("Hospital of Our Lady with the Rose")

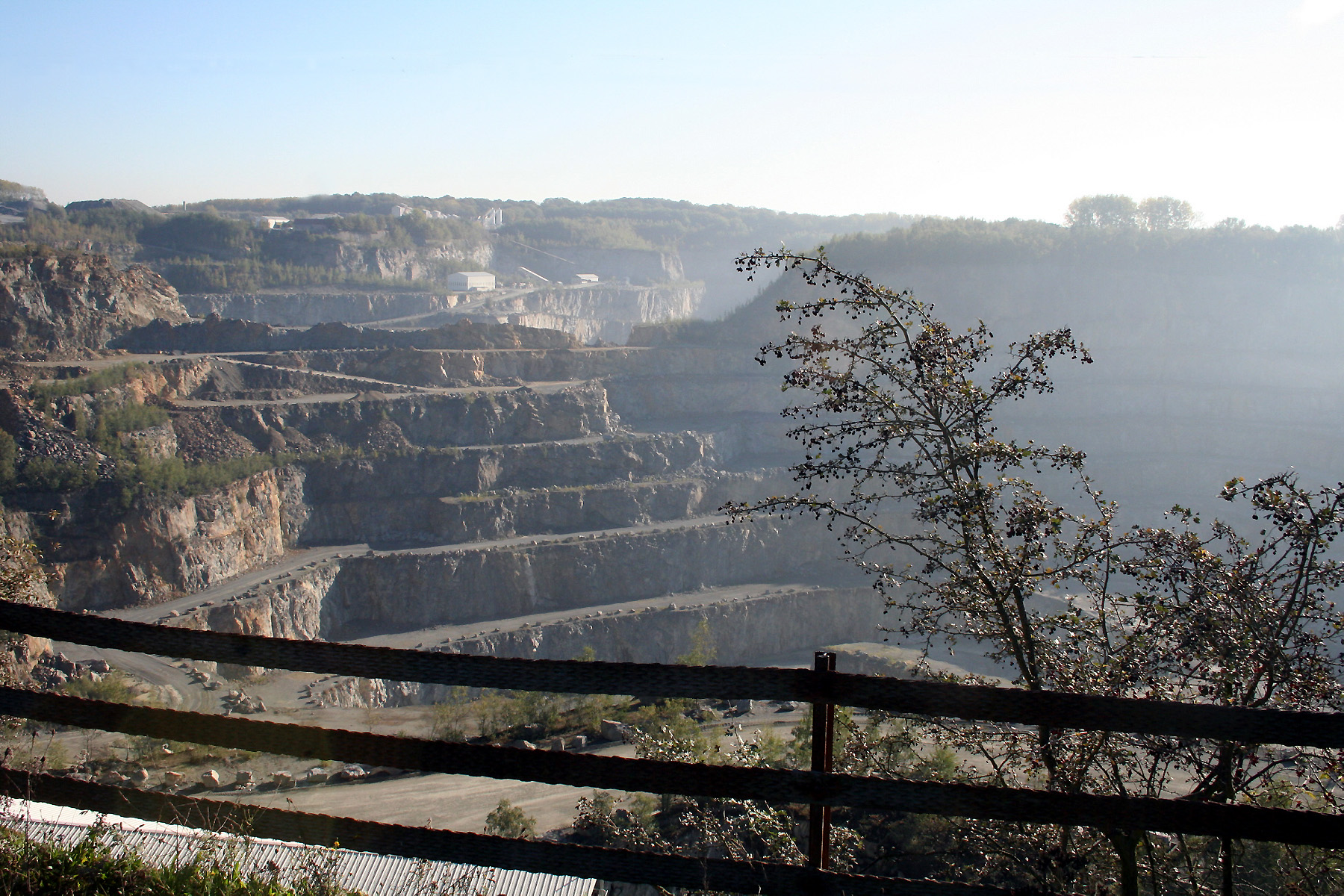
Quarry of Porphyre

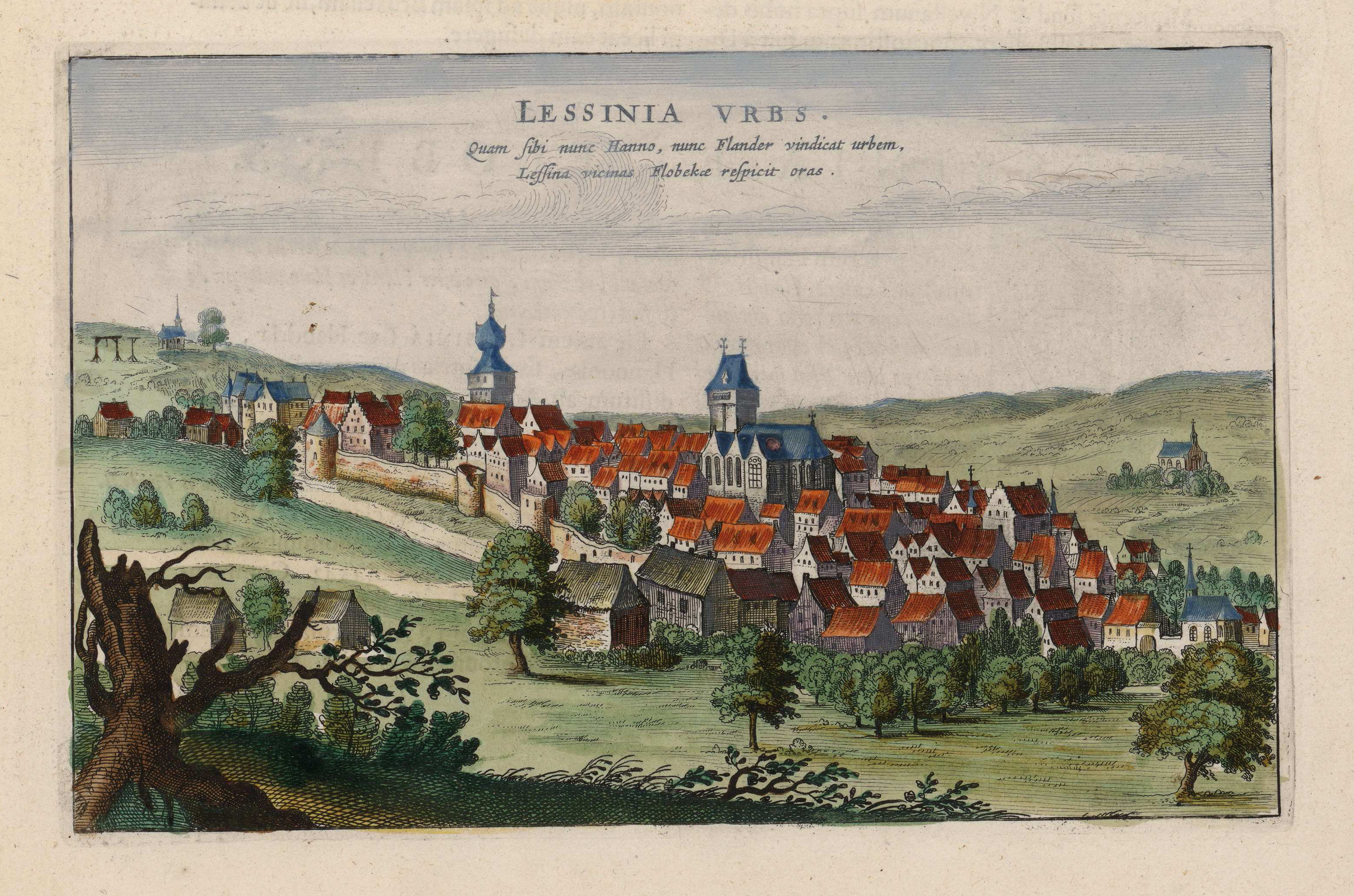
Lessinia Vrbs from Het steden-Boek by Joan Blaeu, c. 1649
