= Jacques Calonne =

Belgian artist and musician (1930–2022)

- Born: 10 August 1930; Mons, Belgium
- Died: 7 February 2022 (aged 91) Brussels, Belgium
- Genres: Classical
- Occupations: Artist; composer; singer; actor; writer

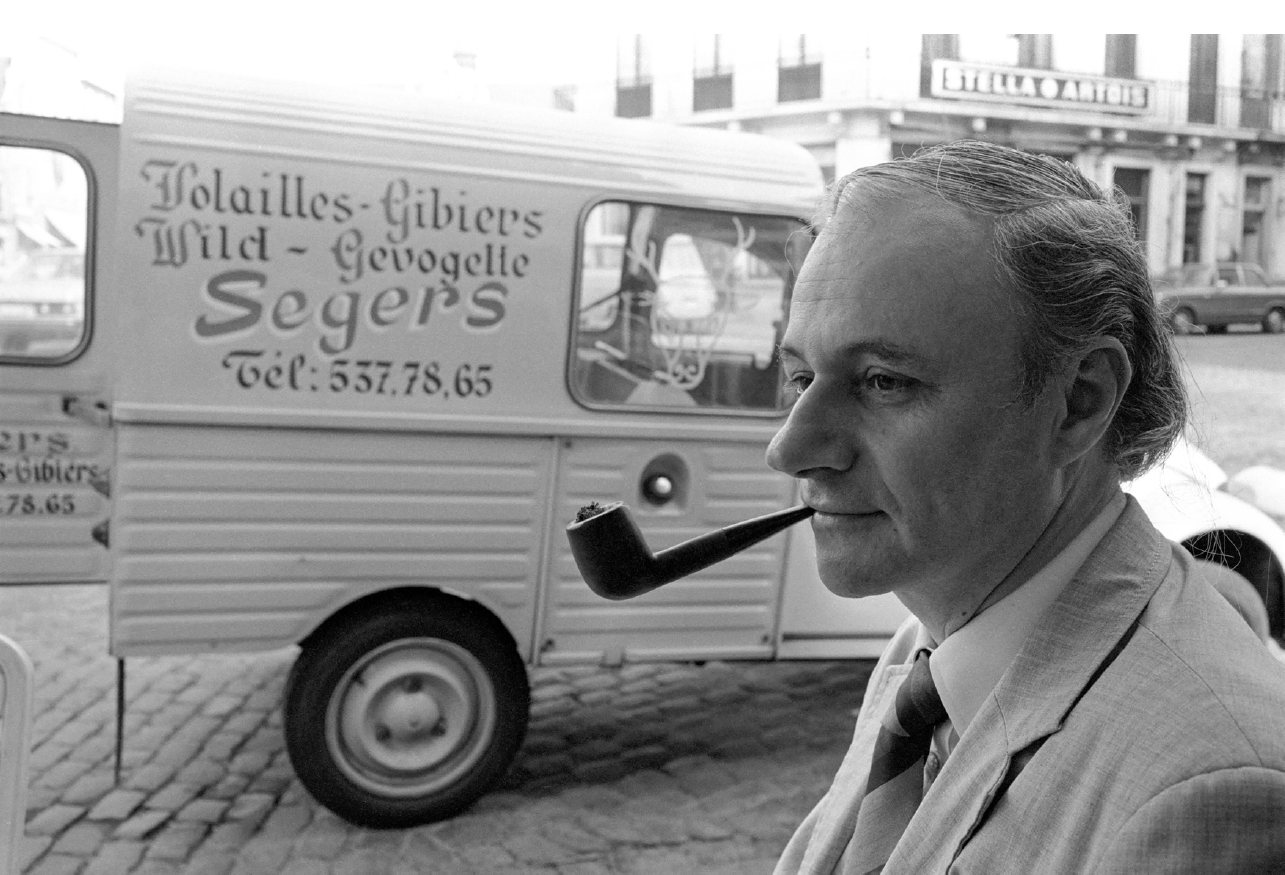
Calonne in 1978 at Parvis de Saint-Gilles, Brussels

Jacques Calonne (10 August 1930 – 7 February 2022) was a Belgian artist, composer, singer, actor, logogramist, and writer.

== Life ==
Born in Mons, Calonne studied music from 1944 until 1946 at the conservatories of Mons and Brussels, with amongst others the composer André Souris, who introduced him to the surrealist movement. He then pursued a course of art studies at the Académie Royale des Beaux-Arts in Brussels from 1947 to 1949, when he attended La fin et les moyens (The End and the Means), the first Belgian exhibition of the COBRA group at the Palais des Beaux-Arts de Bruxelles, where he met Christian Dotremont. He immediately attached himself to this movement, becoming its youngest member and taking part in its meetings in the rue de la Paille, as well as in its review and at the exposition "L'Objet à travers les âges" (The Object through the Ages). Dividing himself between music and visual arts, he continued to pursue a double career after the dissolution of COBRA.

In 1954 he made his first visit to the Internationale Ferienkurse für neue Musik at Darmstadt, where he met Karlheinz Stockhausen and Bruno Maderna. In 1957, he co-signed the "Manifesto against Style" with, amongst others, Serge Vandercam, Pierre Restany, Yves Klein, Roel d'Haese, and Pierre Alechinsky. In 1964, he began publishing his writings (e.g., the novel Belle que jamais, published in Strates, one of Dotremont's journals) while continuing his musical activities. His 1959 composition Quadrangles was performed on 24 January 1965 at the Wallraf–Richartz Museum in Cologne, in the concert series of the second Cologne Courses for New Music.

In 1971, he created the first of his ink-on-music-paper works and published sixteen lithographs, with the title "Muettes", in the Daily Bul. In the following year, he resumed painting in oils on paper and fabric, and exhibited at the Venice Biennale. Perpetuating the spirit of Cobra, he employed the principle of nonspecialization, cherished by the group, creating logograms together with Dotremont. In 1981, he painted on assemblages of match boxes. Though he exhibited in 1949 as a member of Cobra, his first one-man show was mounted only in 1970 at the Dierickx gallery in Brussels. Subsequently, he exhibited many times in this city, where he lived in the working-class neighbourhood of Marolles. He frequently participated in collective exhibitions in Belgium and abroad. His graphic and pictorial work is in the tradition of the plastic practice of writing which developed in Belgium. The rhythm of the elements, the musicality of their distribution in the appropriation of space, and extreme scriptuary fluidity of the symbols reveal the very personal contribution of this musician who painted and drew visual scores.

In 1995 he played the rôle of the Representative of the Ministry of Culture in the 1996 film Camping Cosmos.

Calonne died in Brussels on 7 February 2022, at the age of 91.

== Compositions (selective list) ==
- Quadrangles, for piano (1959)
- Un autre monde, film score (Vandercam & Dotremont 1959)
- Album, for string quartet (6 vols., 1960s)
- Tome, for 2 pianos and 3 percussionists (1962)
- Scolies, for chamber ensemble (ca. 1964)
- Orbes for orchestra (1965)
- Le Pavillon des passions humaines, film score (Claude François, 1988)
- Emergence des avant-gardes en Belgique francophone, film score (1990)

== Writings ==
- 1968. "Aspects d'un resume (Apropos d' Orbes pour orchestre)". Revue d'Esthetique 21, nos. 2–4 ("Musiques nouvelles"): 59–103.
- 1991. Facéties et compagnie de Christian Dotremont. Préface de Pierre Alechinsky, mise en page de Michel Olyff. Brussels: Quadri Gallery.

== Discography ==
- Calonne, Jacques. 1988. Tenor Mondain. Recorded in 1983. Notes by Jean-Pierre Van Tieghem. Igloo IGL 071 (LP)
