= List of Belgian films =

A list of films produced in Belgium ordered by year of release. For an alphabetical list of Belgian films, see Category:Belgian films.

- List of Belgian films before 1960
- List of Belgian films of the 1960s
- List of Belgian films of the 1970s
- List of Belgian films of the 1980s
- List of Belgian films of the 1990s
- List of Belgian films of the 2000s
- List of Belgian films of the 2010s
- List of Belgian films of the 2020s

== See also ==
- List of years in Belgium
- List of years in Belgian television
