= La Vie sexuelle des Belges 1950–1978 =

The Sexual Life of the Belgians (original title: La Vie sexuelle des Belges 1950–78)
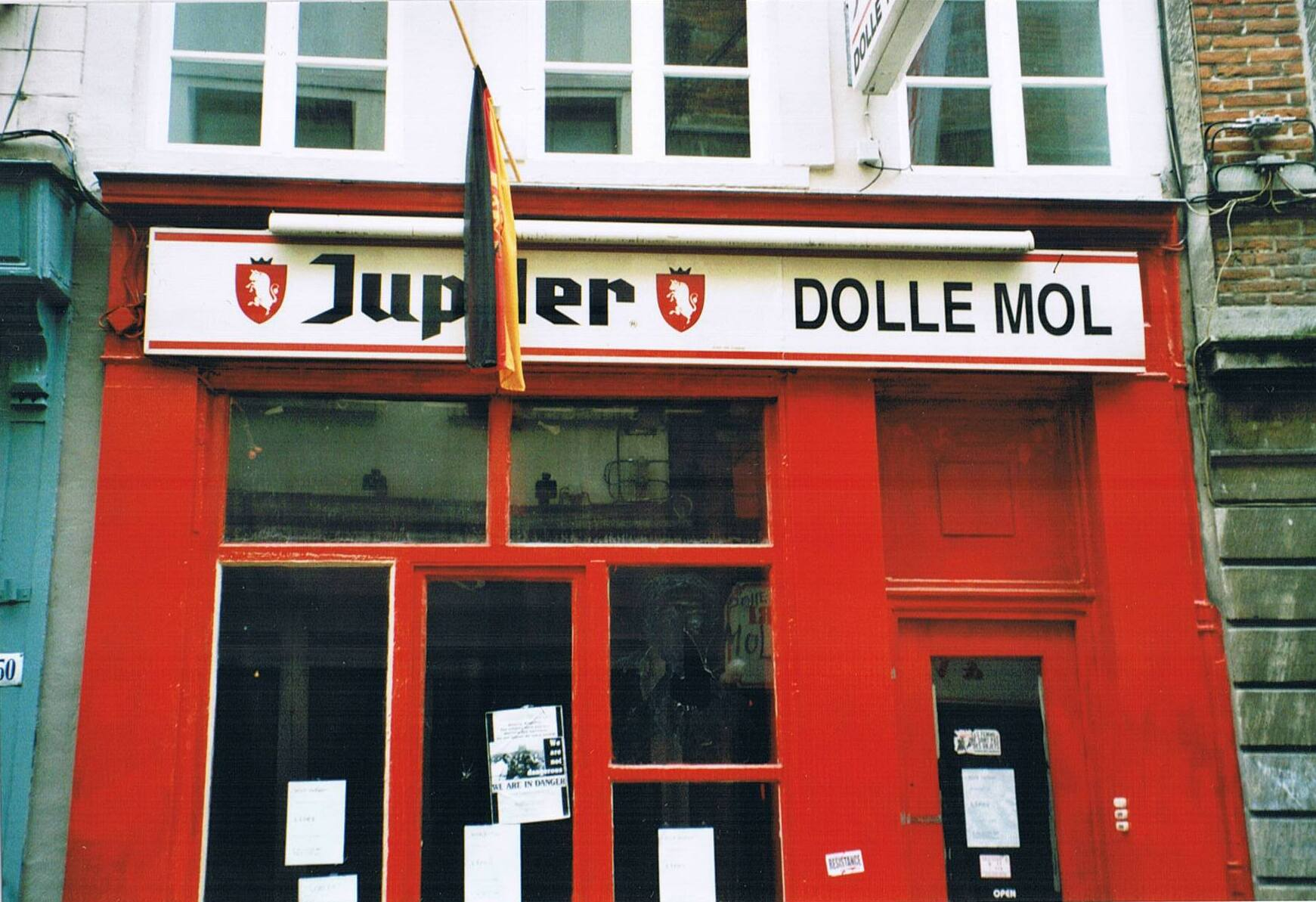
- The Brussels café Dolle Mol where several of the film's scenes were filmed.
- Directed by: Jan Bucquoy
- Written by: Jean-Phlippe Vidon
- Produced by: Francis De Smet, Transatlantic Films Bruxelles
- Starring: Jan Bucquoy, Noël Godin
- Cinematography: Michel Baudour
- Music by: Francis De Smet, Marc Aryan, Gene Vincent, Will Tura, Peter Benoit, Les Dominos.
- Release date: May 1994 (Brussels)
- Running time: 89 minutes
- Country: Belgium
- Language: French

La Vie sexuelle des Belges 1950–78 (The Sexual Life of the Belgians) is a 1994 Belgian comedy film and satire on Belgian provincialism that proved a major cinematic success in Belgium. It was the first film by now-famed Flemish provocateur and director Jan Bucquoy. The film is an adaptation of Bucquoy's comic strip La Vie Sexuelle Avec Mes Femmes and has many autobiographical elements, following his youth in the 1940s, 1950s until the late 1960s.

== Plot ==
The film tells an autobiographical tale of a clueless young bumpkin, Jan, unsuccessfully trying to keep up with the times and failing to be a 1960s free-love youth or political activist, before finally sinking into a mundane life.

== Reception ==
The film received the André Cavens Award for Best Film by the Belgian Film Critics Association (UCC).

- "The cinematography is an unusual blend of the surreal and the mundane, infused with a quirky comic style which flitters between self-mockery and farce. Bucquoy's portrait of his own mother provides the film with its most enduring image, the possessive house-proud woman who casually quips when she notices her husband has died, "it isn't time", and repeatedly states when she finds a way to save money: "it's cheaper that way". If the film is an accurate reflection of the truth, Bucquoy must have had one Hell of an upbringing...".)
