= Noël Godin =

Belgian actor, critic and writer (1945–2026)

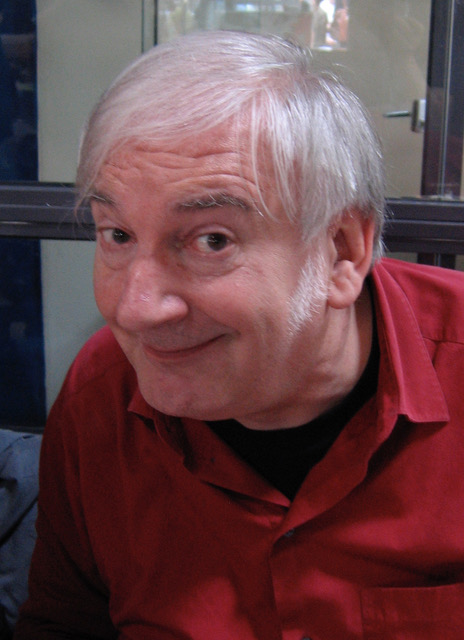
- Godin in 2008
- Born: 13 September 1945; Liège, Belgium
- Died: 23 August 2026 (aged 80); Brussels, Belgium
- Other names: Georges Le Gloupier; L'Entarteur
- Occupations: Writer, critic, actor, anarchist
- Known for: Pieing

Noël Godin (13 September 1945 – 23 August 2026), nicknamed L'Entarteur and Georges le Gloupier, was a Belgian anarchist comedian, writer, critic, actor and notorious pie thrower or entarteur.

His pieing of famous persons started in 1969 with Marguerite Duras and continued throughout his life. His targets included writers, comedians, actors, musicians, audience members, clergymen, presenters, businessmen and politicians. Former minister and future French president Nicolas Sarkozy was pied in 1997, and he hit his most famous target, Bill Gates, in 1998, which increased his notoriety beyond the Francophone world. His favourite and most frequent target was public intellectual Bernard-Henri Lévy, whose reactions (and Godin's systematic pieings of him) became satirised and ridiculed in the media.

He was described as "the French-speaking world's best-known prankster".

== Writing and acting ==
Godin worked at an obscure magazine published by the Belgian Catholic League called Friends of Film. Godin made up most of his articles and made outlandish claims, including that Louis Armstrong had once been a cannibal and had invested in a film called The Vegetables of Good Will in which Claudia Cardinale played a giant endive. In another, he created a fictional blind Thai filmmaker named "Vivian Pei", describing her film, The Lotus Flower Will Never Again Grow on the Edge of Your Island, in such convincing terms that an Asian film specialist travelled to Thailand in an effort to track her down. Such claims went unchallenged due to the magazine's very small readership.

Godin also appeared as an actor in a few films, including a role in Sexual Life of the Belgians, a 1994 comedy film directed by the Belgian provocateur Jan Bucquoy. He also appeared in Bucquoy's Camping Cosmos. In the 1998 documentary Homo Cinematographicus, Godin said he wanted to make life an action film and a burlesque comedy of nothing but highlights.

In 1995 Godin published an autobiography called Cream and Punishment (French: Crème et châtiment; a pun on Crime and Punishment).

== Pieing ==
=== Method ===
Godin insisted he was non-violent and was careful to use only soft pies (purchased from local bakeries) made of cream and sponge cake that would not physically hurt his victims. His actions were accompanied by the cry "Gloup! Gloup!", after Georges Le Gloupier, a fictional character he adopted as an alter ego. He said his humor could be traced back to Bugs Bunny, Wile E. Coyote, the Marx Brothers, Norman Wisdom, and the radical "yippies" of the Youth International Party. Godin tended not to pick Belgian victims, as he insisted that few would notice if he did. He remarked, "The first five seconds after the delivery of a pie offer a stark revelation of a victim's real character."

A supporter of anarchist causes, Godin targeted figures representing elites whom the public had turned against. He said the essence of his technique was to push the pie into the target's face rather than throw it, which he credited for rarely missing. Godin maintained that no amount of security could keep a target safe from the cream.

=== Targets ===
Godin's first pie stunt was in 1969, when he threw a pie in the face of the French novelist Marguerite Duras, rationalising the move by stating, "She has a kind of intelligence and cleverness that serves only her own vanity". He went on to offer justifications for pieing other celebrities such as "pomposity" and "choosing to function in the service of the capitalist status quo".

He pied choreographer Maurice Béjart in 1969, which was followed by the Belgian minister Édouard Poullet (1987), the filmmaker Jean Delannoy (1988), the novelist Vladimir Volkoff (1993), the head of Antenne 2 network Jean-Pierre Elkabbach (1994), the French minister Philippe Douste-Blazy (1995), the hosts Pascal Sevran (1995) and Benjamin Castaldi (2001), the producer Daniel Toscan du Plantier (1996), the Quebec politicians Bernard Landry (2000) and Jean Charest (2003), the rapper Doc Gynéco (2007), and the former archbishop of Mechelen-Brussels André-Joseph Léonard (2011 and 2013).

Over the years he targeted Patrick Bruel and journalists Patrick Poivre d'Arvor (pied in 1996) and Alain Bévérini, whom he pied in 1993.

He also targeted popular events; he pied Hélène Rollès in the middle of a concert in Brussels in 1995, and in 1999 the audience of the Belgian violinist competition called the Queen Elisabeth Competition. At the Cannes Film Festival, he pied directors Marco Ferreri in 1976 and Jean-Luc Godard in 1985, who reacted with humor.

These mostly isolated occasions were in sharp contrast to Bernard-Henri Lévy, whom he and his accomplices targeted on at least eight occasions as a favourite victim. Lévy's violent reactions to the pieings became the subject of numerous instances of ridicule and parody, including Benoît Poelvoorde's Les Carnets de Monsieur Manatane and Renaud's dedicated song in 2012. Godin believed Lévy to be arrogant, considering Lévy's statements claiming to be "the most gifted writer of my generation"; Lévy's frequent boasts of reasonableness and tolerance were repeatedly challenged by media footage of himself covered in cream during a visit to Liège, trying to strangle Godin and shouting, "Get up, or I'll kick your head in". Godin remarked on Lévy:

He takes himself monstrously seriously [...] He is totally in love with himself to the most spectacular degree of imbecility.

Godin's campaign over the years became so effective that whenever Lévy's puppet on the satirical French television show Les Guignols de l'info began to speak, it was silenced by a cream tart. Godin promised to leave the philosopher alone only if he sang a silly song after the next attack.

In 1997, he instructed his accomplices to target the then future French president Nicolas Sarkozy, himself standing aside for fear of being recognised. Remarking upon the stunt, he said:

It has now been thirty-three years since I undertook a pastry crusade, in homage to the comedian Alphonse Allais, against personalities who take themselves very, very, very seriously

Noël Godin had been convicted by the criminal court for throwing a cream pie at the former French Socialist minister Jean-Pierre Chevènement in March of the same year.

A year later, in 1998, Godin gained global attention when his group ambushed Microsoft CEO Bill Gates in Brussels, pelting the software magnate with pies. After bombarding Gates, Godin allegedly said, "My work here is done." Godin said he and his accomplices had drunk Trappist beer for courage beforehand, and called Gates an ideal target for placing his wealth and power at the service of governments.

In a 2005 interview with Het Nieuwsblad, Godin named Pope Benedict XVI, Tony Blair and Silvio Berlusconi as figures he still hoped to pie.

In September 2023, outside the European Commission in Brussels, he claimed to have pelted Ryanair CEO Michael O'Leary with a pie.

==== List ====
Between 1969 and his death in 2026, Godin threw pies at more than 25 people in the fields of culture, politics, and beyond. The list of public figures Godin and his accomplices have targeted with pies includes:

- Marguerite Duras (1969)
- Maurice Béjart (1969)
- Marco Ferreri (1976)
- Bernard-Henri Lévy (at least eight times, including 1985, 1994, 2015)
- Jean-Luc Godard (1985)
- Édouard Poullet (1987)
- Jean Delannoy (1988)
- Vladimir Volkoff (1993)
- Alain Bévérini (1993)
- Patrick Bruel (1993)
- Jean-Pierre Elkabbach (1994)
- Hélène (1995)
- Philippe Douste-Blazy (1995)
- Pascal Sevran (1995)
- Daniel Toscan du Plantier (1996)
- Patrick Poivre d'Arvor (1996)
- Priests at Nantes Cathedral (1996)
- Nicolas Sarkozy (1997)
- Bill Gates (1998)
- The audience of the Queen Elisabeth Competition (1999)
- Bernard Landry (2000)
- Jean-Pierre Chevènement (2002)
- Benjamin Castaldi (2001)
- Jean Charest (2003)
- Doc Gynéco (2007)
- Michael O'Leary (2023)

== Personal life, early life, and death ==
Godin was born in Liège, Wallonia, on 13 September 1945, and resided in Brussels. His youth was rebellious, and he enjoyed scandalising priests during confession by detailing his "horrible sexual life".

He lived in a modest house in the northern part of the city with five cats and his wife, actress Sylvie Van Hiel.

He enrolled at Liège University but was expelled for emptying a pot of glue over the head of a law lecturer who had helped write the constitution for the Portuguese dictator António de Oliveira Salazar.

Godin died in Brussels on 23 August 2026, at the age of 80.

== Books ==
- Anthologie de la subversion carabinée, L'âge d'homme, 1989, ISBN 2-8251-0715-8 (philosophical study of political freedom), updated and expanded edition, 2008
- Zig zig boum boum, Le Veilleur, Toulouse, 1994
- Crème et châtiment : mémoire d'un entarteur, Albin Michel, 1995 ISBN 978-2226078247, OCLC 35995546
- Godin par Godin, Yellow Now, 2001, ISBN 2-87340-151-6
- Armons-nous les uns les autres! (novel), Flammarion, 2003, ISBN 978-2-08-068385-4
- Entartons, entartons les pompeux cornichons!, Flammarion, 2005, ISBN 2-08-068546-5 (The story of all his pieings).
