= Herman Brusselmans =

Belgian novelist

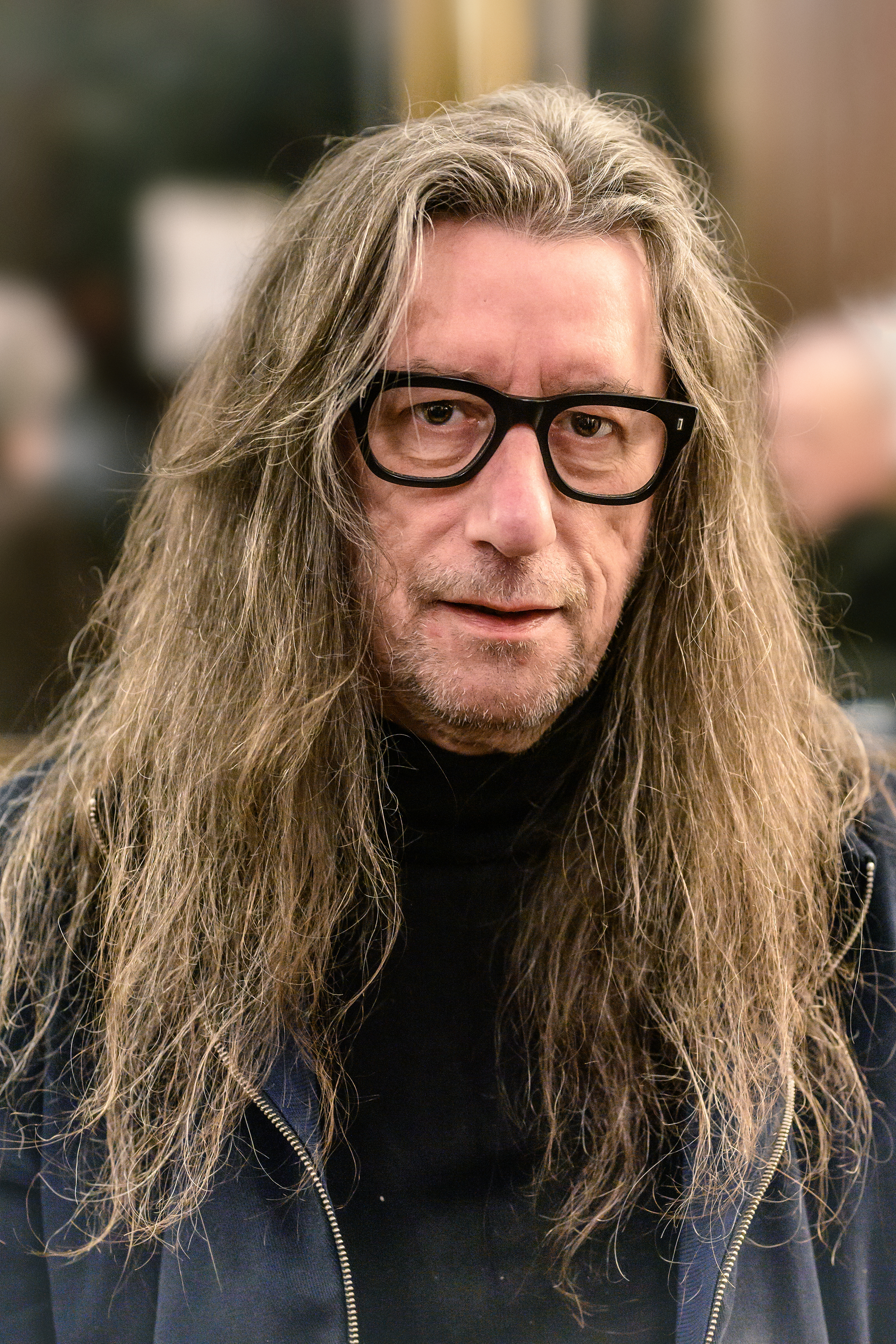
- Brusselmans in 2023
- Born: Herman Frans Martha Brusselmans; 9 October 1957 (age 68); Hamme, East Flanders, Belgium
- Education: University of Ghent
- Occupations: Novelist; poet; playwright; columnist
- Spouses: Gloria van Iddergem (m. 1981; div. 1991) Tania de Metsenaere (m. 2005; div. 2011)
- Partner: Lena (2016–)
- Writing career
- Language: Dutch
- Period: 1982–present
- Notable works: De man die werk vond (1985); Ex-minnaar (1993); De terugkeer van Bonanza (1995); De kus in de nacht (2002); Mijn haar is lang (2009)

Herman Frans Martha Brusselmans (Dutch pronunciation: [ˈɦɛrmɑm ˈbrʏsəlmɑns]; born 9 October 1957) is a Belgian novelist, poet, playwright and columnist. He lives in Ghent. He is one of the best-selling authors in Flanders, but controversial at the same time for his profane language and offensive comedy.

== Life and career ==
Herman Brusselmans studied Germanic philology at the University of Ghent. In his early twenties he was a football player. He played as a left winger for Vigor Hamme and Sporting Lokeren. He now has his own football team called "De Woody's", after his late dog Woody. Brusselmans married Gloria Van Iddergem in 1981 but divorced from her ten years later. He married his second wife Tania De Metsenaere in 2005. Their relationship ended in 2010. In March 2016 he met his current girlfriend with whom he now lives together in his home in Gent. Although it's known her given name is Lena, her family name remains undisclosed up until this day. Their relationship generated a lot of media attention in Flandres because of their age difference of almost 34 years.

Brusselmans gained widespread popularity in the early 1980s as part of the new generation of young Flemish novelists that included Tom Lanoye and Kristien Hemmerechts.

Although Herman Brusselmans once stated in the Flemish magazine HUMO that he would stop writing about existing people and situations, his work kept on being highly autobiographical. Alcohol, sex and boredom are recurring themes throughout his work.

Not only his work contributed to his stardom, but also his media appearances. He used to have his own television show, and still appears regularly on talk shows. He also has a weekly column in HUMO. Bold, straightforward statements and comments have become his trademark throughout the years and don't fail to attract attention, what cost him several lawsuits, the most memorable of which was when Ann Demeulemeester, a Belgian fashion designer, filed a complaint with the courts about a derogatory remark about her in Uitgeverij Guggenheimer. This led to a temporary recall of the book in Belgium.

During the Israel-Gaza war of 2023-4, Brussels-based European Jewish Association (EJA) announced it was initiating legal action against him for incitement to murder. This was in response to Brusselmans writing a graphic column, in which he described imagining scenarios where his wife was a dead Palestinian and his son a boy screaming for his mother, leading him to feel "so angry that I want to ram a sharp knife through the throat of every Jew I meet." He mentioned getting tears in his eyes thinking about an old Jewish man in his street, only to wish him to hell a moment later. In March 2025, the Correctional Court ruled that Brusselmans had not exceeded the limits of the law with the statement in his column and dismissed the case, basing its ruling on the direction that the Constitutional Court and the European Court of Human Rights had already taken.

He played an autistic Hells Angel painting surrealist slogans on caravans in the movie Camping Cosmos (1996).

In the 1980s he wrote some scripts for comics by Erik Meynen.

In early 2007 a film adaptation of Brusselman's novel Ex Drummer was released, directed by Koen Mortier.

He played himself in Het Geslacht De Pauw (2004), Auwch_ (2017) en Echte Verhalen: De Buurtpolitie VIPS (2022) and appeared in the quiz show De slimste mens ter wereld. He also appeared as himself in episode 5392 of the VRT 1 soap opera Thuis as part of a week in which Flemish celebrities make cameo appearances. He knew the character Dirk Vermeersch (Ron Cornet) in the series.

== Partial bibliography ==
- 1982 Het zinneloze zeilen (stories) "Senseless Sailing"
- 1984 Prachtige ogen (novel) "Beautiful Eyes"
- 1985 De man die werk vond (novel) "The man who found a job"
- 1986 Heden ben ik nuchter (novel) "Today I am sober"
- 1987 Zijn er kanalen in Aalst? (novel) "Are There Canals in Aalst?"
- 1988 De Geschiedenis van de Vlaamse Letterkunde. "The History of Flemish Literature"
- 1988 Iedere zondag sterven en doodgaan in de week (short novel) "Passing away every Sunday and dying in the week"
- 1989 Dagboek van een vermoeide egoïst (novel) "Diary of a Jaded Egoist"
- 1989 De Canadese muur (play), together with Tom Lanoye "The Canadian Wall"
- 1989 De Geschiedenis van de Wereldliteratuur (columns) "History of World Literature"
- 1990 Vlucht voor mij (novel) "Run From Me"
- 1991 Ex-schrijver (novel) "Ex-Writer"
- 1992 Het mooie kotsende meisje (stories) "The Pretty Puking Girl"
- 1993 Ex-minnaar (novel) "Ex-Lover"
- 1994 Ex-drummer (novel) "Ex-Drummer"
- 1994 Het oude nieuws van deze tijden (novel) "Nowadays old news"
- 1995 De terugkeer van Bonanza (novel) "The Return of Bonanza"
- 1995 Vrouwen met een IQ (novel) "Women with an IQ"
- 1996 Autobiografie van iemand anders (novel) "Autobiography of Someone Else"
- 1996 Guggenheimer wast witter (novel) "Guggenheimer Washes Whiter"
- 1997 Meisjes hebben grotere borsten dan jongens. (children's poetry) "Girls Have Bigger Breasts Than Boys"
- 1997 Zul je mij altijd graag zien? (autobiography) "Will you love me forever?"
- 1997 Logica voor idioten (semi-autobiographical novel) "Logics for idiots"
- 1998 Bloemen op mijn graf (collection of stories, columns, poetry, etc.) "Flowers on my grave"
- 1998 Nog drie keer slapen en ik word wakker (novel) "Sleeping three more times and I'll wake up"
- 1999 Het einde van mensen in 1967 (stories) "The end of people in 1967"
- 1999 Uitgeverij Guggenheimer (novel) "Publisher Guggenheimer"
- 2000 Vergeef mij de liefde (novel) "Forgive me the love"
- 2000 De koffer (comic book) "The suitcase"
- 2001 Pitface (novel)
- 2002 De Kus in de Nacht (novel) "The Kiss in the Night"
- 2002 Mank (novel) "Limping"
- 2003 De Droogte (novel) "The Drought"
- 2004 Ik ben rijk en beroemd en heb nekpijn (novel)"I'm rich and famous and have a neckache"
- 2004 In de knoei (novel) "In trouble"
- 2004 Heilige schrik (Collection of columns published in HUMO) "Holy fear"
- 2005 Het spook van Toetegaai (novel) "The ghost of Toetegaai"
- 2006 De dollartekens in de ogen van Moeder Theresa (short story) "The dollar signs in the eyes of Mother Teresa"
- 2007 Muggepuut (novel) "Mosquito leg"
- 2008 Toos (novel)
- 2009 Mijn haar is lang (novel) "My hair is long"
- 2009 Kaloemmerkes in de zep (novel) "Tadpoles in the gutter"
- 2010 Trager dan de snelheid (novel)"Slower than speed"
- 2010 Vragen van liefde (short story) "Questions of love"
- 2011 Van drie tot zes (novel) "From three to six"
- 2011 De biografie van John Muts (novel) "The biography of John Muts"
- 2012 Watervrees tijdens een verdrinking (novel) "Fear of water during drowning"
- 2012 Guggenheimer in de mode (novel) "Guggenheimer in fashion"
- 2013 Mogelijke memoires (novel) "Possible memoirs"
- 2013 De Qualastofont (novel) "The Qualastofont"
- 2014 Zeik (detective novel) "Zeik"
- 2014 Poppy en Eddie (novel) "Poppy and Eddie"
- 2014 Poppy en Eddie en Manon (novel) "Poppy and Eddie and Manon"
- 2015 Zeik en de moord op de poetsvrouw van Hugo Claus (detective novel) "Zeik and the murder on Hugo Claus' housekeeper"
- 2016 Zeik en het lijk op de dijk (detective novel) "Zeik and the corpse on the dike"
- 2016 Poppy en Eddie en Manon en Roy Harper (novel) "Poppy and Eddie and Manon and Roy Harper"
- 2016 Nul-Nul (stories) "Zero-Zero"
- 2016 De Fouten (autobiography) "The Errors"
- 2017 Guggenheimer koopt een neger (novel) "Guggenheimer buys a negro"
- 2017 Hij schreef te weinig boeken (novel) "He wrote too few books"

== See also ==
- Flemish literature
