= Jan Bucquoy =

Belgian comics artist and director (born 1945)

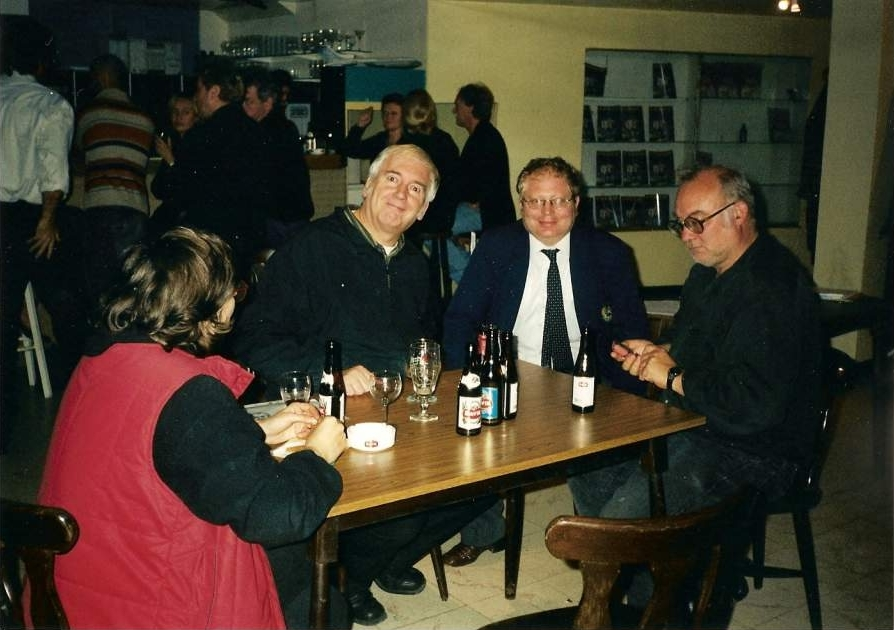
- Jan Bucquoy sitting on the right (dressed in black with glasses, on the corner of the table) during a talk with his producer and with Noël Godin in 2003
- Born: 16 November 1945 (age 81); Harelbeke, Belgium
- Occupations: anarchist, author, filmmaker

Jan Bucquoy (French: [bykwa]; Harelbeke, 16 November 1945) is a Belgian anarchist who has worked in various media (film, comics writing, painting, sculptures, museums). He gained fame for his controversial anti-establishment works and media stunts, which caused many court cases, including for lèse-majesté, copyright infringement and defamation. Between 2005 and 2010 he staged five attempts to attack the Belgian Royal Palace in Brussels and conquer it. Internationally he is best known as a film director, with La Vie sexuelle des Belges 1950–1978 (1994) and the cult film Camping Cosmos (1996) being his most famous films. A recurring theme in his work is Belgitude.

== Career ==
After his studies in Strassburg (theatre) and Brussels (Insas) he started his career as an author of about 50 comics: ((Daniel) Jaunes, Le Bal du Rat Mort (1986), Retour au pays noir, Alain Moreau, etc...). With his producer Francis De Smet he made his much acclaimed series of The Sexual Life of the Belgians (with the famous trilogy) which includes 10 movies and documentaries about the whereabouts of Belgian people from the period after the war until now: the surrealist Camping Cosmos (1996) with Lolo Ferrari and Jan Decleir, and with a parody (détournement) of Tintin and Snowy and of the play Mother Courage and Her Children by Bertolt Brecht; The Closing down of the Renault Factory at Vilvoorde Belgium (1998) as a Belgian version of Roger & Me (1989) by Michael Moore; Les Vacances de Noël with Noël Godin and Yolande Moreau (2005) etc...

He opened the Underwear Museum in Brussels in 2009; in 2016 it moved to its current location in Lessines, Hainaut.

== Influences ==
His movies are a mixture of French avant-garde cinema in the manner of Jean-Luc Godard (La Chinoise (1967), Tout va bien (1972), Italian neo-realism (Roberto Rossellini) and the humanism of Rainer Werner Fassbinder (Satansbraten (1976), The Marriage of Maria Braun (1979); Bucquoy directed some theatrical plays by Fassbinder during his university studies at Strassburg (The Bitter Tears of Petra von Kant). He is influenced by the Situationist book Society of the Spectacle (1967) by Guy Debord.

== Films ==
- La Vie sexuelle des Belges 1950–1978 (1994)
- Camping Cosmos (La vie sexuelle des Belges II ) (1996)
- Crème et châtiment, aka Entartement de Toscan du Plantier au festival de Cannes 1996 (Cream and Punishment ) (short film) (1997)
- Fermeture de l'usine Renault à Vilvoorde (1998)
- La Jouissance des hystériques (La vie sexuelle des Belges IV ) (2000)
- Vrijdag Visdag / Friday Fishday (La vie sexuelle des Belges V ) (2000)
- La Vie politique des Belges (2002)
- La société du spectacle et ses commentaires (La vie sexuelle des Belges VI ) (2003)
- Les Vacances de Noël (2005)
