= Lolo Ferrari =

French pornographic actress (1963–2000)

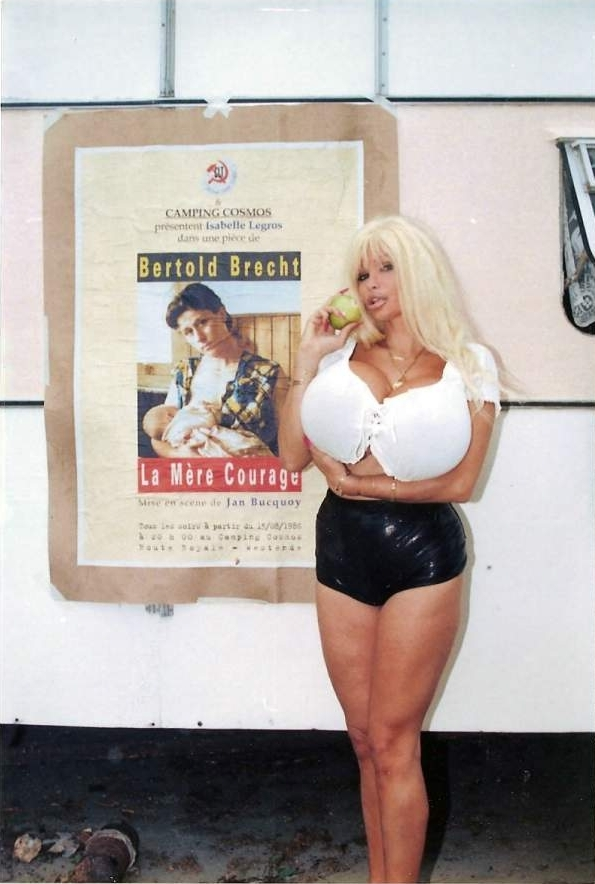
- Ferrari in front of the poster of Mother Courage and Her Children during the making of Camping Cosmos, 1995
- Born: Ève Valois; 9 February 1963; Clermont-Ferrand, Puy-de-Dôme, France
- Died: 5 March 2000 (aged 37); Grasse, Alpes-Maritimes, France
- Spouse: Éric Vigne (m. 1988–2000)

Lolo Ferrari (born Ève Valois; 9 February 1963 – 5 March 2000) was a French dancer, actress, and singer.

She entered the international limelight in 1995, appearing in the French Guinness Book of World Records in 1996 and 1999. Her death in 2000 was ruled a suicide.

== Background ==
Born in Clermont-Ferrand, Puy-de-Dôme, France, Ève Valois was raised in the resort town of La Baule on the Atlantic coast. She often talked about her unhappy childhood, with her father absent and her mother, Catherine Valois (née Ferrari), disliking her. As a teenager, she obtained a few modelling jobs.

In 1988, she married Éric Vigne, a former drug dealer 15 years her senior who had just been released from prison. She then started to work as a model with her husband as manager. She also worked as a prostitute, and her husband was arrested for being her pimp.

== Breast enlargements ==
Encouraged by Vigne, she underwent, beginning in 1990, numerous plastic surgery operations to create a 180-centimetre (71 in) bust (she was originally a 37-inch bust). She had 22 enlargements, which is a Guinness World Record. The Guinness Book of Records (2003) indicates each of her breasts weighed 2.8 kilograms (6.2 lb) and contained three litres of saline.

She wore a specially engineered brassiere. Her brassiere measurements have been given by various sources as 58F, 54G, although these measurements appear false, as breasts of similar size have a bra size of around 36T or 36MMM. The breast implants themselves were reputed to be designed by an engineer who was involved with the design of the Boeing 747.

In interviews, she said about her surgeries, "All this stuff has been because I can't stand life. But it hasn't changed anything", and "I was frightened and I was ashamed; I wanted to change my face, my body, to transform myself. I wanted to die, really."

== Career ==
After the breast enlargements, she adopted the stage name "Lolo", from a French slang word for breasts, along with "Ferrari" as a last name, and made a few pornographic films. Use of the Ferrari name (which she justified as it was her maternal grandfather's surname) led to lengthy trademark infringement court battles with the Italian Ferrari sports car company when she tried to market a line of underwear called Ferrari Underwear and a Lolo Ferrari doll.

In an effort to promote herself, she went with her husband to the Cannes Film Festival in 1995. She won the "European large breasts championship" there, became a favourite of photographers, and entered the international limelight.

She appeared in the Belgian film Camping Cosmos by Jan Bucquoy and producer Francis De Smet. She caused a sensation at the 1996 Cannes Film Festival with the presentation of the film during a remake of the boxing match in Camping Cosmos between the European champion and the former opponent of Muhammad Ali (Jean-Pierre Coopman).

She used her newly won publicity to obtain a regular role on the British Channel 4 television show Eurotrash. The media hype led to appearances on other European shows and work in cabaret shows doing a song and striptease act. Hoping to launch a pop music career, she recorded two singles, titled "Airbag Generation" and "Set Me Free", as well as two more singles, a Euro disco cabaret song called "Dance Dance Dance", and a cover of Thelma Houston's Euro disco hit, "Don't Leave Me This Way". Neither of the latter two songs was given a commercial release.

She was the subject of a 2005 film documentary, Dying to be Beautiful.

== Death ==
On the morning of 5 March 2000, at the age of 37, Ferrari was found dead, of undetermined causes, by her husband at her home in Grasse in the Alpes-Maritimes département on the French Riviera. The original autopsy determined that she had died of an overdose of antidepressants and tranquilizers. She had been depressed, and her death was ruled a suicide. Her parents suspected that her husband was involved, and a second autopsy was approved two years later. This second autopsy found that mechanically induced suffocation could not be ruled out. Her widower was suspected of causing her death, was arrested, and spent 13 months in prison. After a second medical analysis, he was finally cleared of the charges in 2007.

When Channel 4 broadcast Ferrari's obituary on Eurotrash, it was transmitted with straight dubbing as a mark of respect (normally, Eurotrash's dubbing is exaggerated to emphasise the humour); it ended with a caption stating "Lola Ferrari 1970–2000", which was an error since her year of birth was actually 1963. In 2005, the station broadcast a documentary about her life, featuring interviews with her, her husband, her mother and her plastic surgeon.

== Filmography ==
- Le King de ces Dames (1995)
- Big DD (1996)
- Camping Cosmos (1996) as Mme Vandeputte - la plantureuse épouse du gestionnaire du Camping Cosmos
- Double Airbags (1996)
- Planet Boobs (1996)
- Lolo Ferrari Special – The Biggest Tits in the World (1997)
- Mega Tits 6 (1998)
- Quasimodo d'El Paris (1999) as La fée
- Der Generalmanager oder How To Sell A Tit Wonder (Directed by Steffen Jürgens) (2006)

== Discography ==
- Airbag Generation (1996)
