= List of Belgian film directors =

This is a list of Belgian film directors.

== A ==
- Chantal Akerman
- R. Kan Albay
- Jean-Jacques Andrien

== B ==
- Tom Barman
- Rémy Belvaux
- Alain Berliner
- Bert Beyens
- Jef Bruyninckx
- Jean-Marie Buchet
- Jan Bucquoy

== C ==
- Bo & Gustavo Catilina
- Stijn Coninx
- Gérard Corbiau

== D ==
- Jean-Pierre Dardenne
- Luc Dardenne
- Emile Degelin
- Robbe De Hert
- Charles Dekeukeleire
- Eric de Kuyper
- André Delvaux
- E.G. de Meyst
- Dominique Deruddere
- Marc Didden
- Pieter Dirkx
- Frederik Du Chau
- Fabrice Du Welz

== E ==
- Adil El Arbi
- Geoffrey Enthoven

== F ==
- Bilall Fallah
- Jacques Feyder
- Anna Frijters

== G ==
- Jonas Geirnaert
- Delphine Girard
- Noël Godin
- Zeno Graton
- Felix Van Groeningen

== J ==
- Edward José

== K ==
- Yasmine Kassari
- Edith Kiel
- Harry Kümel

== L ==
- Patrick Lebon
- Joachim Lafosse
- Benoît Lamy
- Bouli Lanners
- Vincent Lannoo
- Boris Lehman
- Nicholas Lens
- Roland Lethem
- Matthias Lebeer

== M ==
- Benoît Mariage
- Thierry Michel
- Ernst Moerman

== P ==
- Picha

== R ==
- Maurice Rabinowicz
- Jo Röpke
- Vincent Rouffaer
- Rob Rombout

== S ==
- Raoul Servais
- Ben Stassen
- Henri Storck
- Samy Szlingerbaum
- Boris Szulzinger

== T ==
- Guy Lee Thys
- Patrice Toye

== U ==
- Henri d'Ursel

== V ==
- André Valardy
- Patrick Van Antwerpen
- Jan Vanderheyden
- Jaco Van Dormael
- Erik Van Looy
- Frank Van Passel
- Roland Verhavert

== W ==
- François Weyergans

== Z ==
- Thierry Zéno

== See also ==
- Cinema of Belgium
- List of Belgian films
