= Cinema of Belgium =

- No. of screens: 468 (2022)
  - Per capita: 4.7 per 100,000 (2010)
- Main distributors: 20th Century Fox 19.2% Upi 16.6% Walt Disney Pictures 12.3%

Produced feature films (2009)
- Fictional: 36 (76.6%)
- Animated: 4 (8.5%)
- Documentary: 7 (14.9%)

Number of admissions (2022)
- Total: 13,683,579
  - Per capita: 1.97 (2012)
- National films: 2,245,230

Gross box office (2022)
- Total: €124 million
- National films: €20.2 million

Cinema of Belgium refers to the film industry based in Belgium. Its history dates to the early 20th century and encompasses fiction films, documentaries, animation, experimental cinema, and international co-productions.

Belgian cinema has developed within the country's Dutch-, French-, and German-speaking communities, as well as through interactions with neighbouring film cultures, particularly those of France and the Netherlands. The industry includes distinct Flemish, Francophone and Germanophone traditions, with most filmmakers and institutions operating across linguistic and regional boundaries. Brussels has served as an important centre for film production, distribution, and exhibition, and other cities such as Antwerp, Ghent, and Liège have also played significant roles.

Belgian filmmakers and productions have received international recognition in a range of genres and periods. Notable figures associated with Belgian cinema include directors such as André Delvaux, Chantal Akerman, the Dardenne brothers, Jaco Van Dormael, and Felix van Groeningen, as well as actors, cinematographers, animators, and other filmmakers working in Belgium and abroad.

== History ==
=== Early history ===
While the invention of the cinématographe by the Lumière brothers is widely regarded as the birth of cinema, a number of developments in photography preceded the advent of film. Among the people pioneering work on animation devices was a Belgian professor of experimental physics Joseph Plateau. Plateau, who was active at the Ghent University invented an early stroboscopic device in 1836, the "phenakistiscope". It consisted of two disks, one with small equidistant radial windows, through which the viewer could look, and another containing a sequence of images. When the two disks rotated at the correct speed, the synchronization of the windows and the images created an animated effect. The projection of stroboscopic photographs, creating the illusion of motion, eventually led to the development of cinema.

The first public projection in Belgium took place on 1 March 1896 at the King's Gallery in Brussels. In the following years there was a surge in activity, initially dominated by the French industrial Charles Pathé. One of his assistants, Alfred Machin founded the first production studio in 1910; some of his films are still preserved in the Royal Film Archive in Brussels. The first Belgian movie producer was Hippolyte De Kempeneer, who produced several interesting films until his studio burned down in 1923.

=== 1930–1980 ===
The 1930s however saw the first serious attempt at cinema. Several prominent figures such as Charles Dekeukeleire and Henri Storck experimented with new filming techniques and founded the Belgian Documentary School, which was long regarded as one of the highlights of Belgian Cinema. With the advent of sound, directors such as Jan Vanderheyden fully explored the possibilities of the medium, adapting popular literary works such as De Witte of Ernest Claes. De Witte proved to be a pivotal work in the history of Belgian Cinema. The film was a tremendous popular success and would spawn a future remake and a TV series that was widely acclaimed in its own right.

While attempts to produce a serious feature-length film were frequently met with difficulty, Belgian animated films slowly gained a reputation abroad, led by animators such as Raoul Servais, who won several awards throughout the sixties in a career that culminated with a Golden Palm for best short feature in 1979 for Harpya.

In 1975 the filmmaker Chantal Akerman created Jeanne Dielman, 23 quai du Commerce, 1080 Bruxelles, starring Delphine Seyrig, that was selected for the Cannes Filmfestival. Although it was hailed as a pioneer in especially feminist film making, it didn't get a wide distribution, and Akerman herself was rarely mentioned in descriptions of Belgian cinema. In a critics' poll published by Sight and Sound in 2022, Jeanne Dielman was named the greatest film of all time. Akerman's influence on feminist and avant-garde cinema is substantial, with at least one scholar calling her "one of the most significant directors of our times."

From 1964 on, film could be subsidized by the government, making way for a new generation of filmmakers such as André Delvaux (De Man Die Zijn Haar Kort Liet Knippen, after Johan Daisne's novel), Roland Verhavert (Pallieter, after Felix Timmermans's novel) and Harry Kümel.

=== 1980–2000 ===
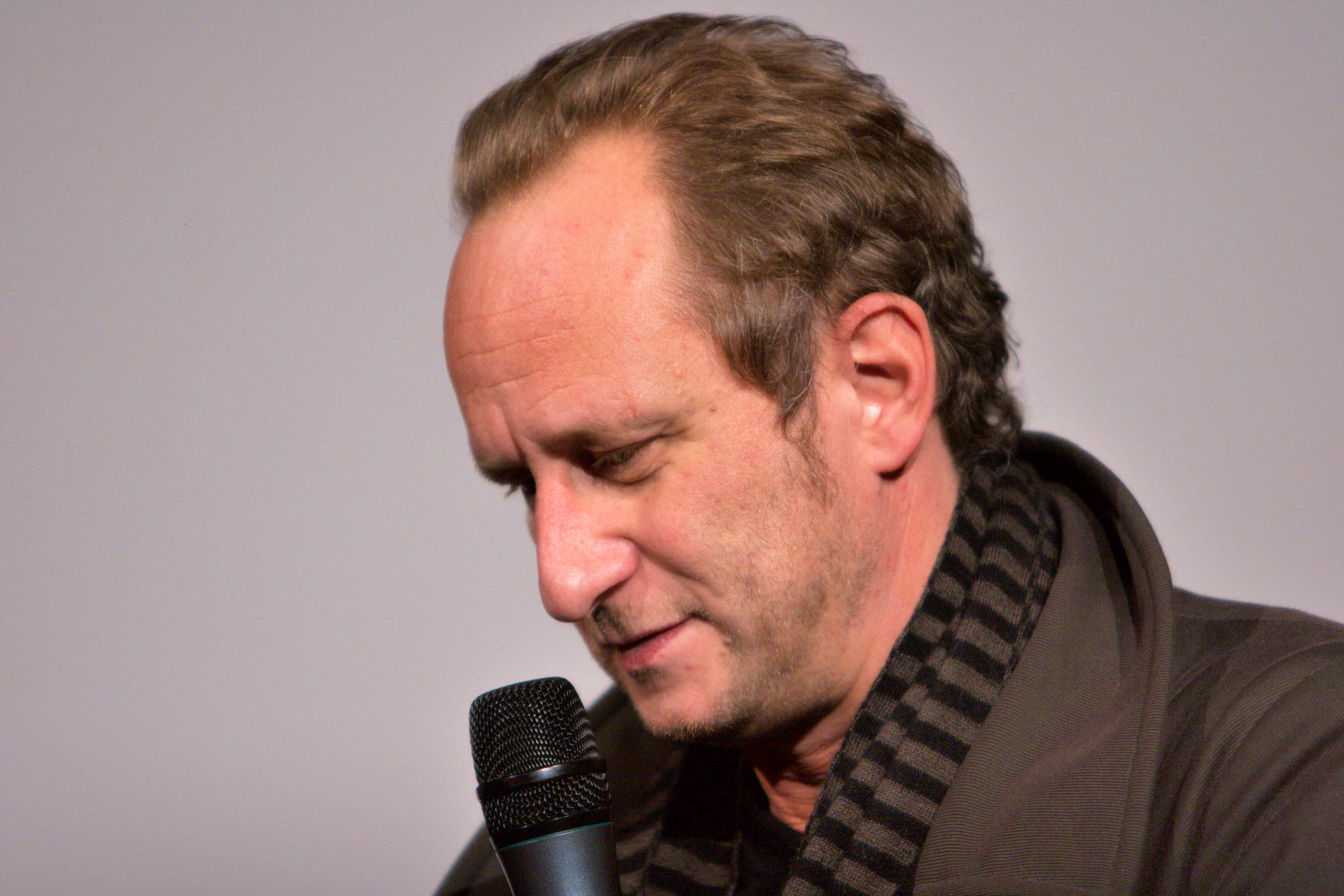
Benoît Poelvoorde, a Belgian actor and the star of Man Bites Dog

The 1980s however saw a break with the tradition of the 60s and 70s, which was increasingly perceived as too stagy or otherwise preoccupied with rural dramas, giving rise to more personal and gritty filmmaking, led by people such as Marc Didden (Brussels by Night) and Robbe De Hert (Blueberry Hill, Brylcream Boulevard). 1985 however saw the release of the ambitious but spectacular failure De Leeuw van Vlaanderen, written and directed by Hugo Claus, after Hendrik Conscience's novel. Belgian acclaim in animation continued with an Academy Award for best animated short in 1987 with A Greek Tragedy, by Nicole van Goethem.

Belgian cinema finally took flight during the 1990s, gaining international prominence with such films as Man Bites Dog (with Benoît Poelvoorde), Daens (directed by Stijn Coninx), Rosetta (directed by the Dardenne brothers) and Toto le Héros (Toto the hero) by Jaco Van Dormael. Toto le Héros gained wide critical acclaim, winning both the César Award for best foreign film and the Camera d'Or at the Cannes Film Festival. In 2000, Dominique Deruddere's Everybody Famous! was nominated for the Academy Award for Best Foreign Language Film. Like Rosetta, the Dardenne's 2005 film L'Enfant won the Palme d'Or at the Cannes Film Festival. Other important Walloon directors include Fabrice du Welz, Lucas Belvaux, Bouli Lanners and Vincent Lannoo.

=== 21st century ===
Pauline and Paulette a 2001 comedy-drama film directed and co-written by Lieven Debrauwer was the Belgian entry for the Academy Awards 2001 in the category Best Foreign Language Film but failed to receive the actual nomination. Dora van der Groen was awarded Best Actress in the Joseph Plateau awards for her role as Pauline. Erik Van Looy's detective movie The Alzheimer Case (known internationally as The Memory of a Killer) was released in 2003. Van Looy's follow up thriller Loft opened in 2008 and had twice as many opening weekend admissions as The Alzheimer Case. Ben X directed by Nic Balthazar became an international success after its release in 2007. The movie was the Belgian Best Foreign Language Film entry in 2007, but failed to be nominated.

Classic literary works continue to be adapted, in particular the work of Willem Elsschot, and often in coproduction with Dutch film companies.

Adaptations of new literary works are also frequent. The Misfortunates directed by Felix Van Groeningen and released in 2009 is an adaptation of the book De helaasheid der dingen by Flemish writer Dimitri Verhulst. The film won several awards including the Prix Art et Essai at the Cannes Film Festival's Quinzaine des Réalisateurs and three Golden Starfish Awards at the 17th Hamptons International Film Festival. The film is the official Belgian entry for the 82nd Academy Awards in 2010 in the category Best Foreign Language Film. Another example of a film adaptation of a modern novel is the 2007 movie Ex Drummer directed by Koen Mortier that was based on the book by Herman Brusselmans of the same name. Mr. Nobody directed by Jaco Van Dormael and released in 2010 gained wide critical acclaim, winning both the Magritte Award for Best Film and the André Cavens Award. In 2012, the Belgian film Rundskop (Bullhead) by Michaël R. Roskam was nominated for the Academy Award for Best Foreign Language Film.

Belgium also annually hosts several film festivals, the most important of which are the Flanders International Film Festival Ghent and the Brussels International Festival of Fantasy Film.

== Belgian films ==
- De Witte (1934)
- The Music Teacher (1988)
- Home Sweet Home (1973)
- Le Choix (1976)
- Toto le Héros (Toto the hero) (1991)
- Man Bites Dog (1992)
- Daens (1993)
- Farinelli (1994)
- Le Huitième Jour (The Eighth Day) (1996)
- Camping Cosmos (1996)
- Rosetta (1999)
- Everybody's Famous! (2000)
- Pauline and Paulette (2001)
- The Alzheimer Case (2003)
- Steve + Sky (2004)
- L'Enfant (2005)
- Ben X (2007)
- Small Gods (2007)
- Loft (2008)
- The Misfortunates (2009)
- Dirty Mind (2009)
- Mr. Nobody (2009)
- Luke and Lucy: The Texas Rangers (2009)
- Bo (2010)
- Oxygen (2010)
- Bullhead (2011)
- The Broken Circle Breakdown (2012)
- Two Days, One Night (2014)
- Los Flamencos (2014)
- N - The Madness of Reason (2013)
- The Brand New Testament (2015)
- Laundry Man (2016)
- Girl (2018)
- De Acht Bergen (The Eight Mountains) (2022)
- Close (2022)
- Rebel (2022)
- Zillion (2022)
- WIL (2023)

== Notable people ==
=== Directors ===
- Pascal Adant
- Chantal Akerman
- Yaël André
- Jean-Jacques Andrien
- Lucas Belvaux
- Edmond Bernhard
- Jean-Marie Buchet
- Jan Bucquoy
- Frans Buyens
- Stijn Coninx
- Robbe De Hert
- Eric de Kuyper
- Jean-Pierre and Luc Dardenne
- Lieven Debrauwer
- Charles Dekeukeleire
- André Delvaux
- Paul Demeyer
- Dominique Deruddere
- Marc Didden
- Frederik Du Chau
- Hugo Claus
- Adil El Arbi and Bilall Fallah
- Anna Frijters
- Noël Godin
- Marion Hänsel
- Patric Jean
- Yasmine Kassari
- Peter Krüger
- Harry Kümel
- Joachim Lafosse
- Benoît Lamy
- Bouli Lanners
- Boris Lehman
- Roland Lethem
- Daniel Maze
- Ernst Moerman
- Koen Mortier
- Picha
- Maurice Rabinowicz
- Raoul Servais
- Olivier Smolders
- Ben Stassen
- Henri Storck
- Samy Szlingerbaum
- Boris Szulzinger
- Henri d'Ursel
- Patrick Van Antwerpen
- Jan Vanderheyden
- Jaco Van Dormael
- Felix Van Groeningen
- Erik Van Looy
- Roland Verhavert
- Jan Verheyen
- Julien Vrebos
- Thierry Zéno
- Fien Troch
- Hans Herbots
- Daniel Lambo
- Olivia Rochette
- Gerard-Jan Claes
- Ruben Desiere
- Nina de Vroome
- Hannes Verhoustraete
- Jean Harlez

=== Actors and actresses ===
- Matthias Schoenaerts
- Jean-Claude Van Damme
- Jérémie Renier
- Annie Cordy
- Antje De Boeck
- Koen De Bouw
- Jan Decleir
- Jacques Brel
- Cécile de France
- Josse De Pauw
- Émilie Dequenne
- Ann Petersen
- Dora Van Der Groen
- Stéphane de Groodt
- Benoît Poelvoorde
- François Damiens
- Alexandra Vandernoot
- Natacha Régnier
- Déborah François
- Matteo Simoni
- Geert Van Rampelberg

== See also ==
- Cinema of the world

== Bibliography ==
- Mathijs, Ernest (ed.), The cinema of the Low Countries, Wallflower Press, London, 2004.
- Mosley, Philip, Split screen: Belgian cinema and cultural identity, State University of New York Press, Albany, 2001.
