= List of Belgian films of 2014 =

The Belgian film industry produced over one hundred feature films in 2014. This article fully lists all non-pornographic films, including short films, that were released in that year and were at least partly made by Belgium. It does not include films first released in previous years that had release dates in 2014. Also included is an overview of the major events in Belgian film, including film festivals and awards ceremonies, as well as lists of those films that have been particularly well received, both critically and financially.

== Major releases ==
Opening		Title	Cast and Crew	Studio	Genre(s)	Ref.
J A N U A R Y	8	Yves Saint Laurent	Director: Jalil Lespert; Cast: Pierre Niney, Guillaume Gallienne, Charlotte Le Bon, Laura Smet, Marie de Villepin	SND Films	Biography; Drama	
J A N U A R Y	15	Divin Enfant	Director: Olivier Doran; Cast: Émilie Dequenne, Sami Bouajila, Géraldine Pailhas	UGC Distribution	Comedy	
F E B R U A R Y	7	Two Men in Town	Director: Rachid Bouchareb; Cast: Forest Whitaker, Harvey Keitel, Ellen Burstyn, Luis Guzmán, Brenda Blethyn	Artists & Co	Drama	
F E B R U A R Y	12	Les Trois Frères, le retour	Director: Didier Bourdon, Bernard Campan; Cast: Didier Bourdon, Bernard Campan	Pan-Européenne	Comedy	
F E B R U A R Y	26	Supercondriaque	Director: Dany Boon; Cast: Dany Boon, Alice Pol, Kad Merad, Jean-Yves Berteloot	Pathé	Comedy	
M A R C H	8	Starry Eyes	Directors: Kevin Kölsch, Dennis Widmyer; Cast: Alex Essoe, Amanda Fuller, Noah Segan	Snowfort Pictures	Horror	
A P R I L	2	Flying Home	Director: Dominique Deruddere; Cast: Jan Decleir, Jamie Dornan, Anthony Head, Josse De Pauw, Max Pirkis		Drama; Romance	
A P R I L	30	Le Dernier Diamant	Director: Éric Barbier; Cast: Bérénice Bejo, Yvan Attal, Annie Cordy, Jean-François Stévenin, JoeyStarr		Drama	
A P R I L	30	Not My Type	Director: Lucas Belvaux; Cast: Émilie Dequenne, Loïc Corbery	AGAT Films	Romance	
M A Y	14	Grace of Monaco	Director: Olivier Dahan; Cast: Nicole Kidman, Tim Roth, Frank Langella, Parker Posey, Milo Ventimiglia, Derek Jacobi, Paz Vega	The Weinstein Company	Biography; Drama	
M A Y	17	Saint Laurent	Director: Bertrand Bonello; Cast: Gaspard Ulliel, Léa Seydoux, Louis Garrel, Jérémie Renier	EuropaCorp	Biography; Drama	
M A Y	17	The Salvation	Director: Kristian Levring; Cast: Mads Mikkelsen, Eva Green, Eric Cantona, Mikael Persbrandt, Jeffrey Dean Morgan, Jonathan Pryce, Michael Raymond-James	Nordisk Film	Western	
M A Y	19	Xenia	Director: Panos H. Koutras; Cast: Kostas Nikouli, Nikos Gelia	Pyramide Distribution	Drama	
M A Y	20	Two Days, One Night	Directors: Luc Dardenne, Jean-Pierre Dardenne; Cast: Marion Cotillard, Fabrizio Rongione	Canal+	Drama	
M A Y	22	Alléluia	Director: Fabrice Du Welz; Cast: Lola Dueñas		Drama	
J U N E	12	Madame Bovary	Director: Sophie Barthes; Cast: Mia Wasikowska, Henry Lloyd-Hughes, Paul Giamatti, Ezra Miller, Rhys Ifans	20th Century Fox	Drama	
J U L Y	18	Ablations	Director: Arnold de Parscau; Cast: Denis Ménochet, Virginie Ledoyen, Florence Thomassin, Philippe Nahon, Yolande Moreau	Ad Vitam Distribution	Drama	
A U G U S T	22	The Missionaries	Director: Tonie Marshall; Cast: Sophie Marceau, Patrick Bruel	Warner Bros.	Romance; Comedy	
A U G U S T	28	Reality	Director: Quentin Dupieux; Cast: Alain Chabat, Jonathan Lambert, Élodie Bouchez, Kyla Kenedy, John Glover, Eric Wareheim; Jon Heder	Diaphana Films	Comedy; Drama	
A U G U S T	28	The Price of Fame	Director: Xavier Beauvois; Cast: Benoît Poelvoorde, Roschdy Zem, Séli Gmach, Chiara Mastroianni, Nadine Labaki, Peter Coyote	Mars Distribution	Comedy; Drama	
A U G U S T	29	The Gate	Director: Régis Wargnier; Cast: Raphaël Personnaz, Olivier Gourmet	Gaumont Distribution	Drama	
A U G U S T	30	Three Hearts	Director: Benoît Jacquot; Cast: Benoît Poelvoorde, Charlotte Gainsbourg, Chiara Mastroianni, Catherine Deneuve	Wild Bunch	Drama	
A U G U S T	31	Return to Ithaca	Director: Laurent Cantet; Cast: Isabel Santos, Jorge Perugorria, Fernando Hechavarría, Néstor Jiménez, Pedro Julio Díaz Ferran	Haut et Court	Comedy; Drama	
S E P T E M B E R	4	Pasolini	Director: Abel Ferrara; Cast: Willem Dafoe, Maria de Medeiros, Ninetto Davoli, Riccardo Scamarcio	Canal+	Drama	
S E P T E M B E R	6	Song of the Sea	Director: Tomm Moore; Cast: David Rawle, Brendan Gleeson, Fionnula Flanagan, Lisa Hannigan, Lucy O'Connell, Jon Kenny, Pat Shortt, Colm Ó Snodaigh, Liam Hourican, Kevin Swierszcz	StudioCanal	Animation; Fantasy	
S E P T E M B E R	7	Tokyo Fiancée	Director: Stefan Liberski; Cast: Pauline Etienne, Taichi Inoue, Julie Le Breton		Drama	
S E P T E M B E R	10	The Connection	Director: Cédric Jimenez; Cast: Jean Dujardin, Gilles Lellouche	Gaumont	Action; Crime; Thriller	
S E P T E M B E R	11	Escobar: Paradise Lost	Director: Andrea Di Stefano; Cast: Benicio Del Toro, Josh Hutcherson, Claudia Traisac, Brady Corbet, Carlos Bardem, Ana Girardot	The Weinstein Company	Romance; Thriller	
O C T O B E R	10	Cub	Director: Jonas Govaerts; Cast: Stef Aerts, Evelien Bosmans, Titus De Voogdt	Kinepolis	Horror	
O C T O B E R	11	Yellowbird	Director: Christian De Vita; Cast: Seth Green, Dakota Fanning, Christine Baranski, Yvette Nicole Brown, Richard Kind, Jim Rash, Danny Glover, Elliott Gould	TeamTO	Animation	
O C T O B E R	14	The Loft	Director: Erik Van Looy; Cast: Karl Urban, James Marsden, Wentworth Miller, Eric Stonestreet, Matthias Schoenaerts, Rhona Mitra, Rachael Taylor, Isabel Lucas	Kinepolis Film Distribution	Erotic; Mystery	
O C T O B E R	29	Wild Life	Director: Cédric Kahn; Cast: Mathieu Kassovitz, Céline Sallette	France 2 Cinéma	Drama	
N O V E M B E R	7	La Famille Bélier	Director: Éric Lartigau; Cast: Karin Viard, François Damiens, Éric Elmosnino, Louane Emera	Mars Distribution	Comedy; Drama	
N O V E M B E R	11	The Clearstream Affair	Director: Vincent Garenq; Cast: Gilles Lellouche, Charles Berling, Laurent Capelluto, Florence Loiret-Caille	Mars Distribution	Thriller	
N O V E M B E R	26	Asterix: The Land of the Gods	Directors: Alexandre Astier, Louis Clichy; Cast: Roger Carel, Guillaume Briat, Lionnel Astier, Serge Papagalli, Florence Foresti	SND Films	Adventure Family; Comedy; Animation	
D E C E M B E R	10	Le Père Noël	Director: Alexandre Coffre; Cast: Tahar Rahim, Victor Cabal	Mars Distribution	Comedy	

== Minor releases ==
Title	Director	Release date	Genre
40-Love	Stéphane Demoustier	17 December 2014 (France)	
7, rue de la Folie	Jawad Rhalib	14 October 2015 (France)	Comedy
After	Yuni Mahieu	23 November 2014 (Belgium)	Drama
A Hitman's Solitude Before the Shot	Florian Mischa Böder	13 November 2014 (Germany)	Comedy
All Cats Are Grey	Savina Dellicour	29 April 2015 (Belgium)	Drama
All Yours (Je suis à toi)	David Lambert	7 October 2015 (France)	Comedy
Atlantic.	Jan-Willem van Ewijk	7 December 2014 (Morocco)	Drama
Belle comme la femme d'un autre	Catherine Castel	29 January 2014 (France)	Comedy
Booster	Daniel Lambo	30 April 2014 (Belgium)	Drama
Bowling Balls	Mark Punt	17 December 2014 (Belgium)	Comedy
Brabançonne	Vincent Bal	10 December 2014 (Belgium)	Musical
Certifiée Halal	Mahmoud Zemmouri	13 May 2015 (France)	Comedy
Chubby	Bruno Deville	5 November 2014 (France)	Comedy
Colt 45	Fabrice Du Welz	6 August 2014 (France)	Action
Dance! Dance! Dance!	Ken Ochiai	22 October 2014 (Belgium)	Musical
De Maagd van Gent	Nicolaas Rahoens	2 April 2014 (Belgium)	Drama
Disparue en hiver	Christophe Lamotte	21 January 2015 (France)	Drama

== See also ==
- 2014 in film
- 2014 in Belgium
- Cinema of Belgium
- List of Belgian submissions for the Academy Award for Best Foreign Language Film
