= Crazy Love (1987 film) =

1987 Belgian film by Dominique Deruddere

- Theatrical release poster
- Directed by: Dominique Deruddere
- Screenplay by: Dominique Deruddere; Marc Didden
- Story by: Stijn Coninx; Urbanus; Walter van den Broeck
- Produced by: Alain Keytsman
- Starring: Josse De Pauw; Geert Hunaerts; Michael Pas
- Cinematography: Willy Stassen
- Edited by: Ludo Troch
- Music by: Raymond van het Groenewoud
- Production company: Multimedia
- Distributed by: Independent Films Benelux
- Release date: 12 November 1987
- Running time: 84 minutes
- Country: Belgium
- Language: Dutch

Crazy Love (French title L'Amour est un chien de l'enfer, alternative English title Love Is a Dog from Hell) is a 1987 Belgian drama film directed by Dominique Deruddere. The script, by Deruddere and Marc Didden, was based on various writings by author and poet Charles Bukowski – in particular The Copulating Mermaid of Venice, CA, which contains necrophilia. The film was conceived as a short titled A Foggy Night but expanded to feature length with Bukowski's approval.

== Plot ==
In 1955, 12-year-old Harry Voss watches a cinema film about a beautiful princess being rescued from a castle by a brave knight. He imagines that his parents met under similar circumstances, an illusion which is shattered when he walks in on them having sex in their bedroom. Stan, an older boy, takes Harry to a fairground to teach him about the opposite sex. At Stan's urging, Harry goes on one of the rides with a girl from school, but is too shy to hold her hand or say anything. The boys then watch voyeuristically as a man seduces Gina, the mother of one of Harry's schoolmates. Gina's son appears and interrupts the tryst. The next day, Stan and Harry sneak into Gina's house and find her passed out in bed from a night of drinking. Stan instructs Harry to mount Gina, but she wakes up screaming, forcing the boys to flee. In the back of a car, Stan shows Harry how to masturbate. Returning home, Harry masturbates to a production still of the screen princess that he stole from the cinema.

In 1962, Harry is an aspiring poet who has reached the end of high school. He also has severe cystic acne on his face and back. Embarrassed by his looks, he skips the school graduation ceremony. His friend Jeff finds him at home and coaxes him into attending prom, even though no one else wants to be seen with him. At the prom, Jeff arranges for his girlfriend to have sex with Harry in their car, but she pushes Harry away, disgusted by his acne. Retreating to the washrooms, Harry wraps his face in toilet paper. He then steps back out onto the dance floor and approaches popular student Liza Velani, who giggles at his appearance but slow-dances with him while the prom singer performs "Love Hurts". While being driven home by Jeff, Harry downs a bottle of liquor. After forcing Jeff to abandon him in the street, he is too drunk to find his house and has to be picked up by police.

By 1976, adult Harry is a destitute alcoholic. At a nightclub, he runs into an old acquaintance called Bill and they go for an intoxicated stroll through town. Along the way, they take the opportunity to play a practical joke by stealing a body bag from an unattended hearse. They take the bag to Bill's house and open it to find the still-warm body of a young woman, who looks just like the princess in the film that Harry saw in 1955. Against Bill's objections, Harry interferes with the corpse. He then drives them to a beach, telling Bill they are going to a wedding. As Bill gets back in the car to sober up and sleep, Harry improvises a marriage ceremony for himself and the woman, then walks out to sea carrying her body. The next morning, Bill awakes to find himself alone. He frantically calls after Harry, who along with the corpse is nowhere to be found.

== Cast ==
- Josse De Pauw as Harry's father, 1962 Harry, and 1976 Harry
- Geert Hunaerts as 1955 Harry
- Michael Pas as Stan
- Gene Bervoets as Jeff
- Amid Chakir as Bill
- Florence Béliard as the princess and the corpse
- Karen Van Parijs as Harry's mother
- Carmela Locantore as Gina
- An Van Essche as Liza Velani
- Doriane Moretus as Marina
- François Beukelaers as Harry's doctor
- Erik Burke as a high school student
- Chris Cauwenberghs as a sailor
- Hans De Munter
- Micheline Van Hautem as the prom singer
- Mieke Verheyden as a mother on a bus
- Marcel Vanthilt as a high school student
- Alexandre von Sivers as a monk

== Reception ==
Characterising the film as a "comedy of desperation with overtones of tragedy", Walter Goodman found the story "remarkably innocent" despite its subject matter. He also praised the "fine performances from all parties", adding: "The episodes are no more than anecdotes really, but rich in incident, and the writing, photography [...] and direction fill them with conviction."

According to DVD Talk, which compared it to films by David Lynch, Crazy Love could be seen "in the same vein as Blue Velvet, unearthing the evil and ugly truths of the world through the eyes of an innocent."

On its American release, the film was championed by public figures including Madonna and Sean Penn.
