= The Over-the-Hill Band =

The Over the Hill Band
- Theatrical release poster
- Directed by: Geoffrey Enthoven
- Written by: Jean-Claude van Rijckeghem; Chris Craps
- Produced by: Dries Phlypo; Jean-Claude van Rijckeghem; Patrick Quinet
- Starring: Marilou Mermans; Lea Couzin; Lut Tomsin; Jan Van Looveren; Lucas Van den Eynde
- Cinematography: Gerd Schelfhout
- Edited by: Philippe Ravoet
- Release dates: August 2009 (Montréal Film Festival); August 19, 2009
- Country: Belgium
- Language: Flemish

The Over-the-Hill Band (a.k.a. Belgian: Meisjes, or Girls in English) is a 2009 Flemish-language Belgian tragicomedy film directed by Geoffrey Enthoven. Main roles are played by Marilou Mermans, Lea Couzin, Lut Tomsin, Lucas Van den Eynde and Jan Van Looveren. The movie was shown at different international film festivals, such as Palm Springs International Film Festival and Seattle International Film Festival.

== Plot ==
Claire, a 70-year-old woman, and her husband have a car accident in which latter dies. On the day of his funeral, Claire is reunited with Lut and Magda. In their late teens, the three were members of a rather famous music group, singing covers of Jacques Brel and other famous artists. The group split after Claire became pregnant. Claire also meets her youngest son Sid again. He absconded many years ago as his parents were only interested in their other son Michel who is now an overanxious man. Over the past years, Sid tried to become a famous R&B-artist but no recording company is interested in his work.

Claire seems to be aware she will not live forever and wants to go on stage again. She neglects the warnings of her general practitioner as she must rest to recover from a sprained leg and a concussion caused by the accident. Claire convinces the puritanic Lut and eccentric Magda. She asks Sid to become their producer. Sid eventually agrees on condition he remixes the songs to his style and the group must be named "The Over the Hill Band". As Lut, Magda nor Sid want to invest money, Claire decides to buy all necessary equipment and rents a room which they rebuilt as a music studio. Sid hires two musicians. Artuur, a friend of Lut, plays the synthesizer. Not much later, Claire falls in love with Artuur and both start a relationship which is disapproved by Lut and Michel.

Michel neither agrees with the revival of the group. He is sure the aged women will only be ridiculed by the public. Furthermore, he has his doubts regarding the costs his mother makes and her mental situation, the more when he discovers Claire sold the families wine cellar for a ridiculous low price. He also notices Claire neglects her housekeeping and forgets meetings with her doctor. Last one becomes very concerned when Claire claims she visited her mother on the coffee some hours earlier, although mother died many years ago. That's why he inscribes her for a mental test.

The rehearsals start and the three women eventually get the grip on the new style. Sid is convinced they will be a success and sends a demo to a talent show competition. Although they are selected, Lut and Magda want to quit for personal reasons. Claire can convince them, if only it was a one-time performance. Michel boycotts as much as he can, now knowing his mother suffers a kind of amnesia, most probably Alzheimer's disease, according to the mental test.

Just before their performance on the contest Claire discovers Artuur is cheating on her. This is such a mental shock her Alzheimer gets the upper hand causing Claire to think she is 20 years old, her mother and future husband are in the public and she is going to sing with the former band. The lights dim away and the story moves to a rest home some time later. It's obviously Claire does not recognize her sons anymore.

Claire stands up and the final scene starts: it's their act during the contest which is a huge success. When the act ends, the story goes back to the rest home where Claire takes her seat again. Although Sid mentions his music career got a huge boost thanks to his mother, it is not revealed the act was performed in reality or only in the mind of Claire.

== Cast ==
- Marilou Mermans - Claire
- Lea Couzin - Magda
- Lut Tomsin - Lut
- Jan Van Looveren - Sid
- Lucas Van den Eynde - Michel
- Barbara Sarafian - Pascale
- François Beukelaers - Jean
- Greg Timmermans - Priest
- Jurgen Delnaet - Doctor
- Robrecht Vanden Thoren - Host talent show
- Michel Israël - Artuur
- Isabel Leybaert - Jessie
- Claude Musungayi - Jo
- Stefan Declerck - Gerd
- Leo Achten - Toon
- Lori Bosmans - Fran
- Bieke Bosmans - Sarah
- Nathalie Stuer - Girl (uncredited)
- Veerle Baetens - Nurse (uncredited)
- Kathleen Goossens - Secretary (uncredited)
