= My Eye for a Camera =

2001 film by Denys Desjardins

- French: Mon oeil pour une caméra
- Directed by: Denys Desjardins
- Written by: Denys Desjardins
- Produced by: Nicole Lamothe
- Starring: Denys Desjardins; Steve Mann; Boris Lehman
- Cinematography: Denys Desjardins; Jacques Leduc
- Edited by: José Heppell
- Music by: Simon Bellefleur; Sandro Forte
- Distributed by: National Film Board of Canada
- Release date: 2001
- Running time: 75 minutes
- Country: Canada
- Languages: English; French

My Eye for a Camera (French: Mon oeil pour une caméra) is a 2001 autofiction film by Quebec film director Denys Desjardins.

== Plot ==
Fascinated by the power of the camera and obsessed with the theories of Russian film pioneer Dziga Vertov, a filmmaker decides to get a camera eye to replace the real eye he lost as a child. This visionary quest begins on the operating table where a surgeon grafts a prototype ocular implant into his eye socket. Seeking a microscopic camera that could be incorporated into his artificial eye so he could secretly film whatever he sees, the filmmaker explores the futuristic technology that could make this possible, while revisiting chapters of his own past.

== Cast ==
- Denys Desjardins
- Steve Mann
- Boris Lehman
- David R. Jordan

== Award ==
The film received a Jutra Award nomination for Best Documentary Film at the 5th Jutra Awards in 2003.
