= Jan Cox (painter) =

Dutch-Belgian painter

- Born: 27 August 1919; The Hague
- Died: 7 October 1980 (aged 61); Antwerp
- Known for: Painting
- Movement: Expressionism

Jan Cox (27 August 1919, The Hague – 7 October 1980, Antwerp) was a Dutch-Belgian painter who spent the largest part of his creative life in the United States and Belgium. He was born in The Hague.

== Life ==
In 1945, he was a founding member of the 'Jeune Peinture Belge' group. By the end of that decade he was briefly associated the CoBrA movement, publishing some of his art in the CoBrA magazine.

In 1950, he moved to New York. After a brief stay in Rome, he returned to the United States in 1956, becoming head of the Painting Department at the School of the Museum of Fine Arts.

In 1974, he returned to Belgium, to live in Antwerp, and devote himself exclusively to painting.

Jan Cox was psychically hyper-sensitive and suffered from recurrent depression throughout his life, eventually leading to his suicide, in Antwerp, in 1980. He is buried in the Schoonselhof Cemetery in Antwerp.

== Work ==
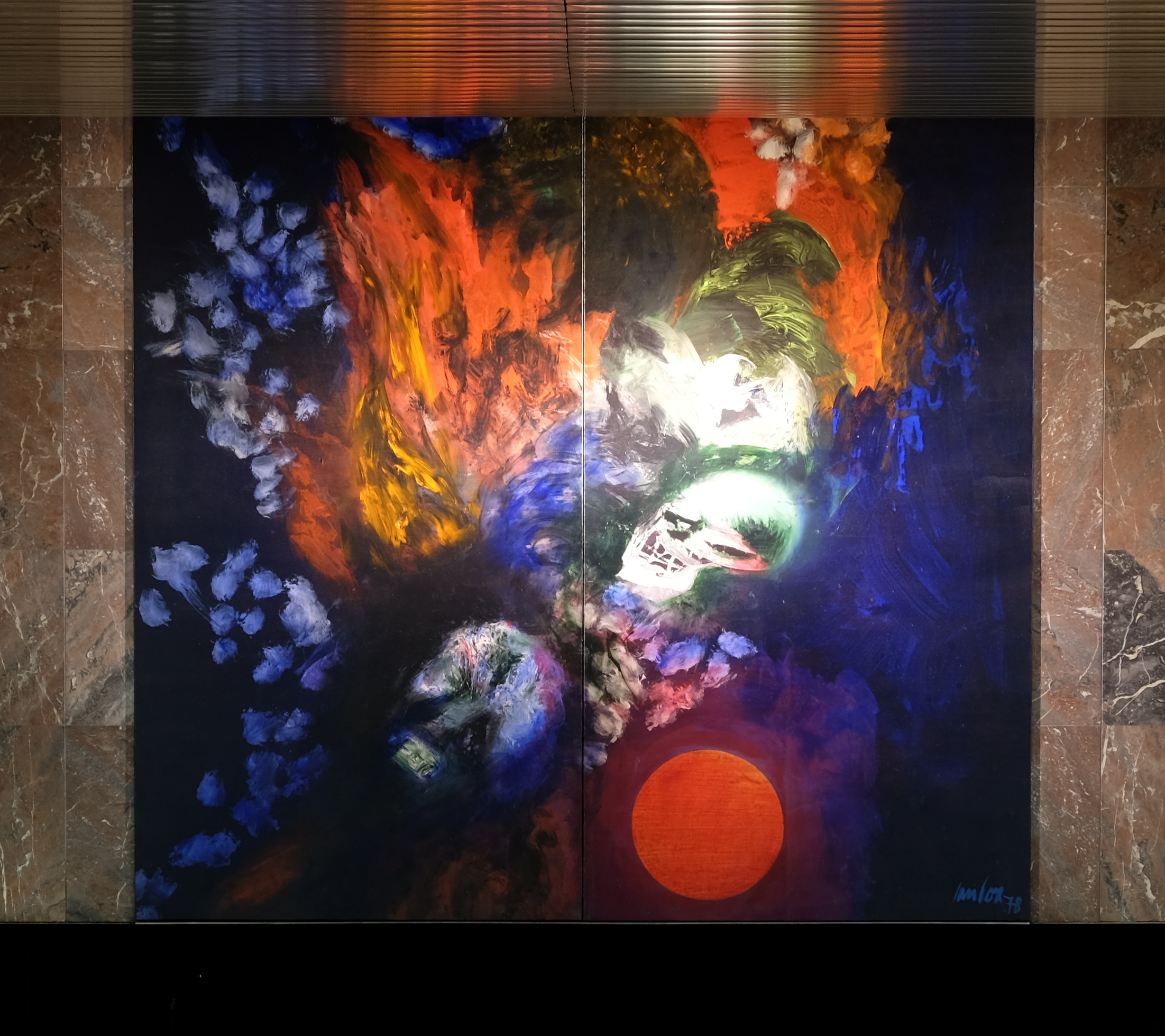
A work of Cox in the Herrmann-Debroux metro station, Brussels, Belgium

Several of his paintings are abstract, though some of his major successes were with (partly) figurative work: for instance, the cycle based on the myth of Orpheus which he produced in Boston, the cycle based on Homer's Iliad he produced after his return to Antwerp.

== Artistic views ==
Jan Cox was convinced that the technical capabilities of a painter were of minor importance for the quality of the painting that resulted: in his view, all the technique a painter needed for the creation of paintings could be learnt in a few months, the rest depended on the painter's creativity.

== See also ==
- Socrate

== Misunderstanding ==
- His name was possibly the origin of an Indonesian swear word, jancok.

== Sources ==
- Jan Cox, a Painter's Odyssey, a 1988 documentary film by Bert Beyens and Pierre De Clercq, with the voice of Jeroen Krabbé telling the story.
- Jan Cox A Painter's Odyssey on IMDb
- Jan Cox at the-artists.org
- Jan Cox on "kunstonline"
- Myth, Symbol and Sexual Imagery in the painting of Jan Cox 1919-1980 - A honours dissertation by Peter P. Shea presented at the School of Art History at the University of St Andrews (UK)
- (Biography in Dutch) Jan Cox - Philippe Pirotte; Robert F. Brown; Claire Van Damme; Karel Boullart. - Brussel : Gemeentekrediet, 1996. - 191 p., ill. - (Monografieën over moderne kunst; 1996: 6). - ISBN 90-5066-169-6
