= Nzambi Mpungu (film) =

1928 film

- Directed by: Ernest Genval
- Release date: 1928
- Running time: 27'
- Country: Belgium

Nzambi Mpungu is a 1928 Belgian film, directed by Ernest Genval and made as part of the Genval Cinematographic Mission. The goal of the Genval Cinematographic Mission in Belgian Congo was to show the work of the Catholic missions and local customs. In Zugulu, a village in the Kwango region, a sorcerer warns N’Goma and his wife about the dangers of the "priests of the white man’s God". Joseph, a member of the same ethnic group, encourages them to convert. He teaches them to read and write, count, basic carpentry... and to know the real god, Nzambi Mpungu. Will N’Goma and Kaoulou be persuaded?
