= Denys Desjardins =

Canadian film director and film historian (born 1966)

- Education: Concordia University
- Occupations: Director, producer, screenwriter, film historian

Denys Desjardins (born 1966 in Montreal, Quebec), is a film director, screenwriter, cinematographer, editor and film historian for more than twenty years. After completing studies in literature, film and communications, he directed several acclaimed films.

== Career ==
Desjardins received the Quebec Film Critic (Association québécoise des critiques de cinéma, or AQCC) award for best short film two years in a row for La Dame aux poupées (The Doll Lady) (1996) and for Boris Lehman, filmmaker (1997), a portrait of Boris Lehman the Belgian filmmaker for whom life is a reason to make films, and making films is a reason for living. He then joined the National Film Board of Canada, where he directed Almanach 1999-2000 and My Eye for a Camera – nominated for a Jutra Award for best documentary in 2003 – as well as Being Human and Rebel with a Camera, which won him the Quebec Film Critic award for best medium-length documentary.

Desjardins has also produced and co-directed the short films Me Bob Robert and Peter and the Penny; the latter received the award for best short fiction film at the 2006 Festival Images en vue. Desjardins’ third feature-length film, The Great Resistance, was nominated for a Jutra Award for best documentary in 2008. His 2011 documentary (The Private Life of Cinema) follows the path of filmmakers who never gave up on their dream to produce feature-length fictions films and create a Quebec film industry. With Joanne Robertson, he created a web production, Making Movie History: A Portrait in 61 Parts, to celebrate the National Film Board of Canada's 75th anniversary in 2014.

== Selected films ==
Year	French Title	English Title	Roles	Theme	Others	Awards
1996	La Dame aux poupées	The Doll Lady	director-screenwriter producer	Mme. Boudreault shares her two-story cottage with over 400 dolls, which give her free rein to dream and explore her fantasies	cinematography: Hélène Choquette, Denis-Noel Mostert editing: Vincent Guignard	Best short film, Rendez-vous du cinéma québécois
1998	Contre le temps et l'effacement, Boris Lehman...	Boris Lehman, filmmaker	director-screenwriter producer cinematographer	Friends, filmmakers, critics, and crew offer their understanding of Boris Lehman, Belgian filmmaker		Best short film, Rendez-vous du cinéma québécois
1999	Almanach	Almanach 1999-2000	director-screenwriter	At the brink of year 2000, a time when Nostradamus and other prophets predicted doomsday, a cosmic meltdown, Almanach 1999-2000 takes a humorous look at the world of divination.		
2001	Mon oeil pour une caméra	My Eye for a Camera	director-screenwriter cinematographer	Fascinated by the power of the camera and obsessed with the theories of Russian film pioneer Dziga Vertov, a filmmaker decides to get a camera eye to replace the real eye he lost as a child.		Nominated, Jutra Award for best documentary
2003	Moi Robert "Bob"	Me Bob Robert	director-screenwriter producer cinematographer			
2005	Histoire d'être humain	Being Human	director-screenwriter cinematographer			
2005	Pierre et le Sou	Peter and the Penny	director-screenwriter producer cinematographer	Celebrating his 50th birthday, intellectually challenged Peter's family want to break open his piggy bank to find a rare and valuable American penny.	Co-director, co-writer, co-producer: Stéphane Thibault; Co-cinematographer: Julie Perron; Editor: Stéphane Lafleur	Best short fiction film, 2006 Festival Images en vue
2006	Le direct avant la lettre	Rebels with a Camera	director-screenwriter	Where does cinéma vérité come from? Who were its predecessors and what did they create? Compelled by the urge to get closer to the people in front of the camera, cinema vérité sprouted in a context of unprecedented creative freedom.		Best medium-length documentary, Rendez-vous du cinéma québécois
2007	Au pays des colons	The Great Resistance	director-screenwriter cinematographer	In the 1930s, in the throes of the Great Depression, the government of Quebec relocated more than 80,000 citizens to found a new settlement in the virgin forests of Quebec's Abitibi region.		Nominated, Jutra Award for best documentary
2008	Retour en Amérique	Back to the New World	director-screenwriter producer			
2009	De l'office au box-office	From NFB to Box-Office	director-screenwriter producer	The film documents the development of Quebec cinema, from the founding of the National Film Board of Canada in 1939 to the creation of the Canadian Film Development Corporation in 1968, recounting the stories of Quebec filmmakers who never gave up on their dream to produce feature-length fiction films, and creating a Quebec film industry.		
2011	La vie privée du cinéma	The Private Life of Cinema	director-screenwriter producer	An in-depth two part exploration of the evolution of the private Quebec film industry, through the eyes of more than 50 industry professionals.		
2013	Kapadokya	Kapadokya	director-screenwriter producer cinematographer			
2014	Mes 7 lieux		producer			
2015	La guerre des bleuets	The War of the Blueberries	producer			
2017	La Zone	The Zone	director-screenwriter producer cinematographer			
2020	Le Château	The Castle	director-screenwriter producer			Nominated, Prix Iris for best editing
2021	L'industrie de la vieille$$e	The Busine$$ of Aging	director-screenwriter producer cinematographer			Best digital component for a documentary show or series, Prix Gémeaux
2022	J'ai placé ma mère	I Lost My Mom	director-screenwriter producer cinematographer			Gémeaux Awards for Best Original Production for Digital Media: Documentary and Best Canadian Feature Documentary
