= Everybody's Famous! =

- Directed by: Dominique Deruddere
- Written by: Dominique Deruddere
- Produced by: Dominique Deruddere
- Starring: Josse De Pauw; Eva Van Der Gucht; Werner De Smedt; Thekla Reuten; Victor Löw
- Edited by: Ludo Troch
- Distributed by: Miramax Films
- Release date: 12 April 2000
- Running time: 97 minutes
- Country: Belgium
- Languages: Flemish, Spanish, English

Everybody's Famous! (Flemish: Iedereen beroemd!) is a 2000 Belgian satirical comedy film directed by Dominique Deruddere about a young teenage girl who is pushed by her poor parents to become a musical star. It was nominated for Best Foreign Language Film at the 73rd Academy Awards.

== Plot ==
Seventeen-year-old Marva Vereecken is a regular at singing contests which she never wins. When her father, Jean, gets laid off, he decides to kidnap the number one singer in the country, Debbie. The kidnapping greatly increases sales of Debbie's latest single, much to the pleasant surprise of Michael, Debbie's manager. Michael in turn proposes a secret deal to make Marva a star if Jean agrees to keep Debbie out of the way for as long as Michael wants.

== Cast ==
- Josse De Pauw – Jean Vereecken
- Eva Van Der Gucht – Marva Vereecken
- Werner De Smedt – Willy Van Outreve
- Thekla Reuten – Debbie
- Victor Löw – Michael Jensen
- Gert Portael – Chantal Vereecken
- Ianka Fleerackers – Gaby
- Alice Reys – Lizzy
- George Arrendell – Knappe man
- François Beukelaers – NTO directeur
- Silvia Claes – Omroepster
- Marc Didden – Cameraman

== Reception ==
=== Critical response ===
Everybody's Famous has an approval rating of 55% on review aggregator website Rotten Tomatoes, based on 53 reviews, and an average rating of 5.39/10. The website's critical consensus states, "Though some critics consider Everybody Famous too lightweight to have deserved a slot among the Academy Awards foreign film nominations, this whacky satire of the cult of celebrity makes for loopy, cheerful fun". Metacritic assigned the film a weighted average score of 60 out of 100, based on 18 critics, indicating "mixed or average reviews".

=== Awards and nominations ===
Group	Award	Winner/Nominee	Won
Academy Awards	Best Foreign Language Film		Nominated
Festróia – Tróia International Film Festival	Best Screenplay	Dominique Deruddere	Won
Festróia – Tróia International Film Festival	Golden Dolphin	Dominique Deruddere	Nominated
Joseph Plateau Awards	Best Belgian Actor	Josse De Pauw	Won
Joseph Plateau Awards	Best Belgian Actress	Eva Van Der Gucht	Nominated
Joseph Plateau Awards	Best Belgian Director	Dominique Deruddere	Nominated
Joseph Plateau Awards	Best Belgian Film		Nominated
Ljubljana International Film Festival	Audience Award	Dominique Deruddere	Won

== See also ==
- List of Belgian submissions for Academy Award for Best Foreign Language Film
- Fanney Khan, an Indian remake of Everybody's Famous!
