= Bonnie & Clyde Copycats =

Bonnie&Clyde Copycats
- Directed by: Bo & Gustavo Catilina
- Written by: Bo & Gustavo Catilina
- Starring: Bo Catilina; Gustavo Catilina; Marc Isselee; Philip Van Bosstraeten; Michel Gabriels; Barbara Axters; Luc Deschrijver; Wim Vandeleene; Mighel Wensch
- Music by: Bo & Gustavo Catilina
- Production company: BogusCat Productions
- Release date: 13 December 2017
- Running time: 50 minutes
- Country: Belgium
- Language: English

Bonnie & Clyde Copycats is a 2017 Belgian action film written and directed by Bo & Gustavo Catilina.

== Plot ==
Bruges is threatened by two notorious mob gangs: the truthful Alfredo's gang and the Toriettis, who have more values.

Betty and Marc are an average couple who hate their jobs and dress up as Bonnie & Clyde to try and have a little fun. When they accidentally witness Alfredo, killing a key figure in the Torrieti family, they get entangled in their gang war.

They weren't careful what they wished for and are obliged to live a life like their heroes, Bonnie and Clyde, although they now realize that a peaceful life isn't so bad after all.

== Production ==
Bonnie & Clyde Copycats was filmed at the same time as Direction Lourdes in the summer of 2014, for a total budget of €0.

== Location ==
The entire film was shot on location in and around Bruges. The climax was filmed at the international airport of Ostend-Bruges.
