= Fanney Khan =

2018 Indian film directed by Atul Manjrekar

- Theatrical release poster
- Directed by: Atul Manjrekar
- Written by: Adapted Story and Screenplay: Atul Manjrekar; Dialogues: Abbas Dalal; Hussain Dalal
- Based on: Everybody's Famous! by Dominique Deruddere
- Produced by: Bhushan Kumar; Krishan Kumar; Anil Kapoor; P.S Bharathi; Rajiv Tandon; Kussum Arora; Rakeysh Omprakash Mehra; Deepanshu Mishra; Nishant Pitti; Virrendra Arora; Prerna Arora
- Starring: Anil Kapoor; Aishwarya Rai Bachchan; Rajkummar Rao
- Narrated by: Rajkummar Rao
- Cinematography: Tirru
- Edited by: Monisha R. Baldawa
- Music by: Score: Tubby-Parik; Songs: Amit Trivedi; Tanishk Bagchi
- Production companies: T-Series Films; Rakeysh Omprakash Mehra Pictures; Anil Kapoor Films & Communication Network
- Distributed by: AA Films
- Release dates: 2 August 2018 (United Arab Emirates); 3 August 2018 (India)
- Running time: 130 minutes
- Country: India
- Language: Hindi
- Budget: ₹38 crore
- Box office: ₹16.55 crore

Fanney Khan (Hindi pronunciation: [pʰənneː xaːn]; lit. 'braggart') is a 2018 Indian Hindi-language musical comedy film written and directed by debutant Atul Manjrekar. It was jointly produced by the banners T-Series Films, Rakeysh Omprakash Mehra Pictures, Theme Studios and Anil Kapoor Films & Communication Network. A remake of the 2000 Belgian film Everybody's Famous!, it stars Anil Kapoor, Aishwarya Rai Bachchan and Rajkummar Rao in lead roles. The film follows Kapoor as the titular character, the middle-aged father of a young, aspiring, and overweight teenage girl whom he pushes to be a singer. He kidnaps a famous soloist to make way for his daughter to become a star.

The film was announced in June 2016 with Kapoor playing the lead role; after considering Priyanka Chopra and R. Madhavan among others for the other two starring roles, Rai and Rao were chosen. It was mostly filmed in Mumbai in September 2017. Rai's costumes were redesigned by Manish Malhotra after she expressed dissatisfaction over the previous clothes. After the shooting was disrupted in April 2018 over producer KriArj Entertainment's non-payment of dues, Bhushan Kumar of T-Series took over the entire production. Filming was completed in Mehboob Studios, Mumbai in June 2018.

Fanney Khan was initially scheduled for a worldwide release on 15 June 2018, coinciding with Eid. It was postponed, and had its initial release in the United Arab Emirates on 2 August 2018, and was released worldwide on 3 August 2018.

== Plot ==
Prashant Kumar Sharma (Anil Kapoor), a part-time vocalist in an orchestra, who is popularly known as Fanney Khan, dreams of becoming a singer but circumstances prevent him from being one. He rushes to the hospital and holds his newborn daughter, whom he names Lata, after the famous Indian playback singer, Lata Mangeshkar.

A grownup Lata (Pihu Sand) has an excellent voice but is ridiculed for being overweight. She is a fan of Baby Singh (Aishwarya Rai Bachchan), a famous superstar singer, who is tired of her life and wants a break. Prashant's factory is shut down and he starts working as a taxi driver.

One day, Baby's manager Kakkad, talks to her about staging a wardrobe malfunction to gain publicity. Enraged, Baby storms out of Kakkad's car and looks for a taxi. Coincidentally, Baby travels in Prashant's taxi. Prashant mixes sleeping pills in the water bottle when she asks for water. He calls his best friend Adhir Sinha (Rajkummar Rao) and tells him that he is kidnapping Baby to release an album of his daughter. After much pleading, Adhir agrees to help him.

During this incident, Adhir and Baby become friends. Adhir finally takes her out secretly and she starts enjoying herself. She tells him that her real name is Sumitra and she grew up in an orphanage, learning music from the church choir. She also thanks him for bringing her pet dog, Ustaad, whom she considers her true friend but problems arise when Prashant sees on TV that the police are aware of Baby's kidnapping as the watchman of Baby's residence reveals that he saw a man (Adhir) kidnap her dog.

Prashant eventually tells Baby about Lata, who assures him that she will be even more better than her. While wearing a mask of Rajnikanth, Prashant asks Kakkad (Girish Kulkarni) to release an album of his daughter. Lata is excited about her album, and after recording, she talks about her family and experience, leading Kakkad to realise that her father is the kidnapper and is the famous Fanney Khan. He recognises him in their next meeting. Prashant finally removes his mask and reveals that he can trust him and his friend Adhir.

Lata replaces Baby as the performer on the reality show India ki Awaaz. Meanwhile, Adhir and Baby are nowhere to be found. Police and TV personnel arrive outside Prashant's factory and surround the premises. Prashant calls Kakkad and asks him what is happening and Kakkad tells him to walk outside and tell the police and TV that if Lata does not perform, he will shoot the real Baby. The TV reporters patch Prashant through with the TV placed inside India ki Awaaz and Prashant and Lata have an emotional talk. She performs well and stuns the audience. Later, Prashant walks out of the factory with his hands up but to his surprise, the police and TV men clap for Prashant.

Later, Baby posts on Instagram that she and Adhir are in a live-in relationship and on vacation in Srinagar. They both state that they are fans of Lata. The film ends with the society praising Lata and the hard work done by Prashant to make his daughter a singer. Lata later becomes a nationwide superstar.

== Cast ==
- Anil Kapoor as Prashant Kumar Sharma a.k.a. "Fanney Khan"
- Aishwarya Rai Bachchan as Sumitra "Baby" Singh, a famous superstar
- Rajkummar Rao as Adhir Sinha
- Divya Dutta as Kavita Sharma, Prashant's wife
- Pihu Sand as Lata Sharma, Prashant's Daughter
- Satish Kaushik as Kader Bhai
- Barbie Rajput as Rhea Rajput
- Girish Kulkarni as Karan Kakkad, Baby's Manager
- Swati Semwal as Jinal Khan
- Suddu Ali as Zina Singh
- Karan Singh Chhabra as Rapper Guddu

== Production ==
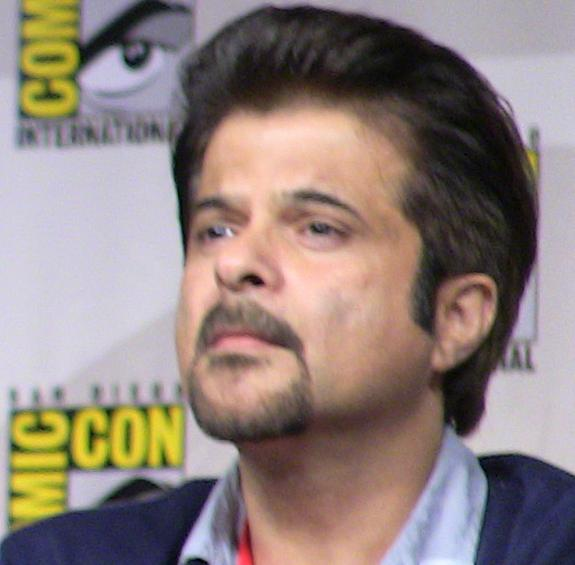
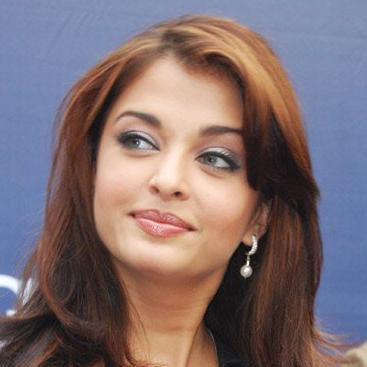
Kapoor (above) and Rai (below) began filming their scenes together in November 2017

=== Development ===
In June 2016, it was announced that Anil Kapoor would play the lead role in a Rakesh Omprakash Mehra production, which was tentatively titled Fanney Khan. The film is an official remake of the Dominique Deruddere-directed Belgian Dutch-language satirical comedy Everybody's Famous! (2001). The original was nominated for Best Foreign Language Film at the 73rd Academy Awards, and follows the relationship between a father and her teenage girl, whom he forces to be a singer. Fanney Khan was directed by debutant Atul Manjrekar, who had previously directed television advertisements and was a close associate of Mehra. Other than Kapoor and Mehra, members of the cast and crew were not finalized when the production was announced. Musical recording and other preparations began on 20 June 2016, and auditions were initiated for the role of two teenage characters.

Prernaa Arora of KriArj Entertainment wanted Aishwarya Rai Bachchan to play the character and directly approached her. The announcement also declared that the role of the pop singer would be played by Rai. Arjun N. Kapoor of KriArj conveyed that the film dealt with a father-daughter relationship and said, "Fanney Khan is a very emotional story that needs to be told." The film marked the third collaboration between Kapoor and Rai after Taal (1999) and Hamara Dil Aapke Paas Hai (2000).

In August 2017, reports suggested that R. Madhavan was being considered to play the romantic interest of Rai's character. Arora declined to acknowledge the rumors, adding that she couldn't confirm the news before anything was decided. She stated that Mehra and Manjrekar were searching for a suited actor to play the character up to that time. On 31 August 2017, Madhavan stated that he couldn't play a role in the film owing to conflicting schedules with his other films. On the same day, Mehra publicly revealed that Rajkummar Rao would play the role opposite Rai through his Twitter handle. Rao stated that he would attend workshops and readings in preparation after filming for the web-series Bose: Dead/Alive in Poland.

Mehra initially approached Kapoor in 2013, the year he directed Kapoor's daughter Sonam a second time after Delhi-6 (2009) in Bhaag Milkha Bhaag, with the idea of a remake and gave him a DVD of Everybody's Famous!. At the time, Kapoor did not take Mehra's request seriously. During the production of Mirzya, which was directed by Mehra and starred Kapoor's son Harshvardhan, he was approached again by the film's financer and distributor to consider the proposal. Kapoor then watched the original, and realized that he was foolish in not agreeing to do the film earlier. Mehra and Kapoor then procured the rights to remake Everybody's Famous! from its makers. He played the role of a middle-aged singer and father in Fanney Khan, which was the second time he portrayed a singer in his career after Woh Saat Din (1983). Kapoor felt that no film in Bollywood had previously dealt with the subject of body-shaming. The film's subject also has parallels to his real life.

Manjrekar joined the film after Mehra asked him if he wanted to direct the subject. He felt that it was a relevant subject. Manjrekar felt that the film merely retained the "soul and essence" of the original.

=== Filming ===
Principal photography of Fanney Khan commenced on 3 September 2017 in Mumbai. The initial filming schedule only included Kapoor, Divya Dutta and debutant actress Pihu Sand. Both Rao and Rai later joined the film on 3 October 2017. On 6 October 2017, Rai refused to film as she was not satisfied with the costumes assigned to her; as a result, shooting was postponed to late October and Rai's costume designer, Manish Malhotra, was asked to redesign the clothes.

Filming was supposed to resume on 26 October 2017, but was further postponed after Rao fractured his leg while filming for the Farah Khan and Ali Asgar-hosted television show Lip Sing Battle. Eventually, Rai began filming her scenes along with Kapoor on 5 November 2017 in Mumbai. While filming, some photographs featuring Kapoor and Rai were leaked from the set. In April 2018, filming was stalled by unpaid crew members, becoming the fourth time a KriArj Entertainment production was entangled in a financial controversy. KriArj had had to part ways with Parmanu (2018), Kedarnath and Batti Gul Meter Chalu after in light of similar issues. In May 2018, the company opted out of Fanney Khan to resolve all matters concerning the production house; Bhushan Kumar of T-Series took over the task of completing the production.

Rai's introduction song, titled "Mohabbat", was choreographed by Frank Gatson Jr., who had previously worked with Jennifer Lopez, Beyonce and Rihanna, among others. In June 2018, Rai completed the rehearsal for her entry sequence. On 19 June 2018, the final filming schedule was completed at Mehboob Studios in Mumbai. A wrap-up party was held at the studio and was attended by all members of the cast.

== Soundtrack ==
The music of the film was composed by Amit Trivedi and Tanishk Bagchi while the lyrics were written by Irshad Kamil.

Amit Trivedi recreated Mohammad Rafi's hit song "Badan Pe Sitare" from Prince (1969) and Ustad Nushrat Fateh Ali Khan's song "Halka Halka". Tanishk Bagchi recreated Noor Jehan's 1946 song "Mohabbat" from Anmol Ghadi (1946).

== Release ==
Fanney Khan was initially scheduled for an Eid release on 15 June 2018, but it was postponed until 3 August 2018.

After the release of Fanney Khan's trailer and poster in June 2018, Vashu Bhagnani sent a legal notice to its producers for not crediting him as the distributor and co-producer of the film. As per Bhagnani's claim, he had entered into an agreement with Prernaa Arora of KriArj Entertainment to acquire the all India distribution rights of the film, which also entitled him to be credited as co-producer of the film. Replying to this, Ankit Relan from the legal team of T-Series said that T-Series was never consulted or informed about this arrangement and since the movie is being jointly produced by multiple producers, KriArj Entertainment does not have the right to grant distribution rights to anyone without taking consent from them. In a hearing that took place in July 2018, the Delhi High Court restrained Vashu Bhagnani from interfering in the distribution and release of Fanney Khan.

=== Home media ===
The film was made available as VOD on Amazon Prime Video on 12 October 2018.
