= Rebels with a Camera =

- Directed by: Denys Desjardins
- Written by: Denys Desjardins
- Produced by: National Film Board of Canada
- Cinematography: Alex Margineanu
- Edited by: Vincent Guignard
- Distributed by: National Film Board of Canada
- Release date: February 18, 2006 (Rendez-vous du Cinéma Québécois)
- Running time: 50 minutes
- Country: Canada
- Languages: French; English

Rebels with a Camera (French: Le direct avant la lettre) is a 2006 documentary film by Quebec director Denys Desjardins produced by the National Film Board of Canada (NFB). The title is a reference to the film Rebel Without a Cause

== Synopsis ==
Where does cinéma vérité come from? Who were its predecessors and what did they create? Compelled by the urge to get closer to the people in front of the camera, cinema vérité sprouted in a context of unprecedented creative freedom. Avant-garde techniques and the pioneering filmmakers behind them, notably National Film Board of Canada icon Michel Brault, set the stage for a new movie-making philosophy born in the ‘50s and ‘60s, a philosophy whose influence lives on in virtually every facet of today's media.

Denys Desjardins recounts the story of a collective of rebel artists who revolutionized shooting and production methods within the backdrop of Quebec's Quiet Revolution. Interviews with forerunners Michel Brault, Roger Blais, Wolf Koenig, Denys Arcand, Marcel Carrière, Roman Kroitor, Terence Macartney-Filgate, Fernand Dansereau, Claude Fournier, Jean-Claude Labrecque, Jacques Giraldeau, and others, revisit a pivotal turning point in the evolution of modern film.

== Award ==
- Awarded by the Quebec Film Critics Association for Best medium length Documentary of 2005.
