= Eva Van Der Gucht =

Belgian actress

Eva Van der Gucht
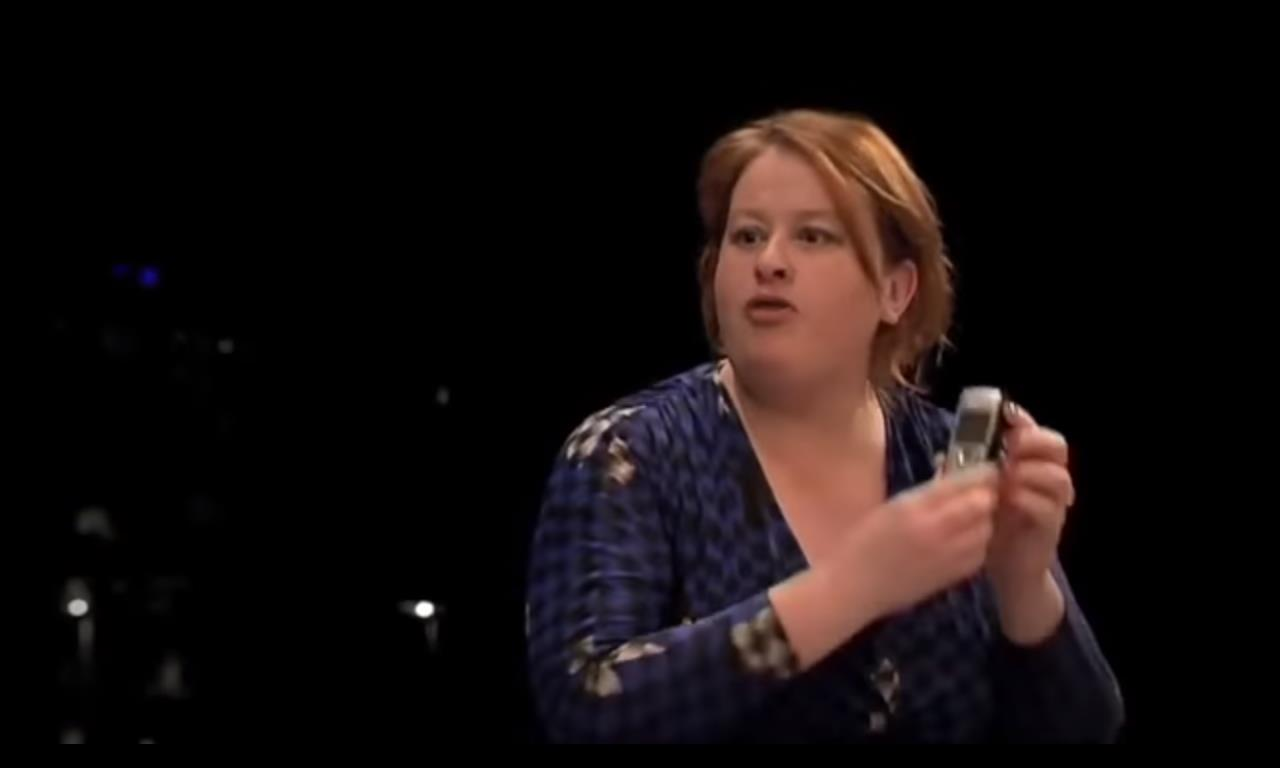
- Van der Gucht in 2012
- Born: 1 September 1977 (age 48); Mortsel, Antwerp, Belgium
- Occupation: Actress
- Years active: 1999–present
- Website: http://www.evavandergucht.com/

Eva Van der Gucht (born 1 September 1977) is a Belgian actress.

Eva graduated in 2000 at the Amsterdam Theater and Drama academie. While studying she was selected to star in the film Everybody's Famous! which was nominated for an Oscar for best foreign feature film in 2001. After graduating Eva built a multi-faceted international career both in film, television and theater. On television Eva is known for series like S1ngle, Connie & Clyde, Den elfde van den elfde, Oogappels, Klokhuis, Hunter street and the improvisation program De vloer op. After her starring role in Everybody famous Eva played in several films like Kursk, The Family Claus, Amnesia, North Sea Texas, Cool kids don’t cry, Dik Trom, Hallo Bungalow, Oude liefde and many others. In the theater Eva starred in different plays from Shakespeare to Chekhov with the following theatre companies: Het RoTheater, Orkater, de Toneelmakerij, Oostpool, de Spelerij and many more. She has appeared in more than forty films since 2000.

== Selected filmography ==
Year	Title	Role	Notes
2000	Everybody's Famous!	Marva Vereecken	
2001	AmnesiA	Esther	
2004	Snowfever	Eef	
2011	North Sea Texas	Pim's Mother	
2012	Achtste Groepers Huilen Niet	Juf Ina	
2012	Time of My Life		
2019-2023	Oogappels	Carola Metsers	TV Series
2022	Kerstappels	Carola Metsers	
2023	Eerste Hulp Bij Kerst		
