= Brussels by Night =

- Theatrical release poster
- Directed by: Marc Didden
- Written by: Marc Didden; Dominique Deruddere
- Produced by: Erwin Provoost
- Starring: François Beukelaers; Ingrid De Vos; Amid Chakir
- Edited by: Ludo Troch
- Music by: Raymond van het Groenewoud
- Release date: 1983
- Running time: 92 min.
- Languages: Dutch, French

Brussels by Night is a Belgian drama film from 1983, directed by former Humo journalist Marc Didden. The low budget picture was financed partly by Herman Schueremans, organizer of the Flemish rock festival Rock Werchter. The film was named after a 1979 song by Raymond van het Groenewoud, who also wrote the soundtrack for the movie.

Brussels by Night was important in Belgian film history because its bleak, grey atmosphere and stream of consciousness structure were a sharp contrast with the more conventional films the country produced up to then.

== Plot ==
Brussels 1983. Max is seriously depressed. He tries to commit suicide by sticking a gun in his mouth, but when the gun jams, he cries. We follow him as he travels through Brussels without any goal and provokes everyone he meets. His mood changes at the most unpredictable moments. Max meets two people, Alice, a bar keeper, and Abdel, her customer of Moroccan descent. Both men fancy Alice as their mistress. The climax of the story takes place on the Ronquières inclined plane.

== Cast ==
- François Beukelaers as Max
- Johan Joos as station assistant
- Mariette Mathieu as lady in train
- Daniël van Avermaet as taxi chauffeur
- Michiel Mentens as Louis
- Nellie Rosiers as Josephine-Charlotte
- Marleen Merckx as waitress
- Ingrid de Vos as Alice
- Amid Chakir as Abdel
- Bernard van Eeghem as night club bouncer
- Jan Reussens as receptionist
- Fred van Kuyk as Jules
- Machteld Ramoudt as Sister Alice
- Liliane de Waegeneer as ecologist at party
- Paul Pauwels as blonde boy at party
- Jim van Leemput as parking meter man
- Josse de Pauw as man in laundrette
- Jaak Pijpen as guide in Ronquières
- Ronny Waterschoot as police officer
- Guy Mortier as assistant-judge
- Senne Rouffaer as judge
- Brendan Fonteyne as son of Max
- Fransceska Buelens as wife of Max

== Awards ==
- 1980: Staatsprijs for Best Script
- 1983: Best Debut Filmfestival of San Sebastian
- 1983: Silver trophy Spanish Federation of Ciné-Clubs at the Filmfestival of San Sebastian
- 1983: André Cavens Prijs: Best Belgian film (Belgische Unie van de Filmkritiek)
- 1984: 'Outstanding Film of the Year' Filmfestival of Londen
