= I Lost My Mom =

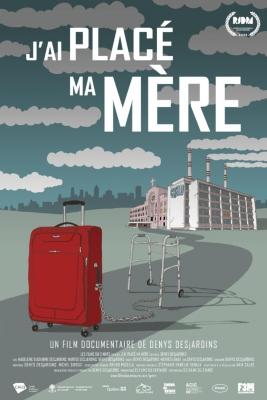
- Film poster
- French: J'ai placé ma mère
- Directed by: Denys Desjardins
- Written by: Denys Desjardins
- Produced by: Denys Desjardins
- Starring: Denys Desjardins; Maryse Desjardins; Madeleine Ducharme
- Cinematography: Denys Desjardins; Mathéo Lemay
- Edited by: Denys Desjardins; Michel Giroux
- Music by: Stephanie Hamelin Tomala
- Production company: Films du Centaure
- Distributed by: Les Films du 3 mars
- Release date: November 25, 2022 (RIDM)
- Running time: 75 minutes
- Country: Canada
- Language: French

I Lost My Mom (French: J'ai placé ma mère) is a 2022 Canadian documentary film, directed by Denys Desjardins. The film documents the experiences of Desjardins and his sister Maryse as they navigate the process of trying to get their mother Madeleine Ducharme, who suffered from advancing Alzheimer's disease, placed in a CHSLD, and then trying to stay involved in her care as she contracted COVID-19 during the early days of the pandemic when harsh safety restrictions were being imposed. It is a sequel to his 2020 film The Castle (Le Château), which profiled Madeleine as she initially confronted the prospect of having to move from her longtime home in a seniors' retirement complex to a more managed care setting.

The film premiered on November 21, 2022, at the Montreal International Documentary Festival.

== Awards ==
The film was screened at the 2023 Hot Docs Canadian International Documentary Festival, where it was named the winner of the Best Canadian Feature Documentary award.

Stéphanie Hamelin Tomala received a nomination for Best Original Score for a Documentary Feature Film at the 2023 Canadian Screen Music Awards.

At the 12th Canadian Screen Awards in 2024, Hamelin Tomala received a nomination for Best Original Music in a Documentary, and Desjardins and Michel Giroux were nominated for Best Editing in a Documentary.

Denys Desjardins received a Gémeaux Awards from the Academy of Canadian Cinema and Television for Best Original Production for Digital Media: Documentary.
