= The Great Resistance =

- Directed by: Denys Desjardins
- Written by: Denys Desjardins
- Produced by: National Film Board of Canada
- Cinematography: Denys Desjardins
- Edited by: Elric Robichon
- Music by: Simon Bellefleur
- Distributed by: National Film Board of Canada
- Release date: 2007
- Running time: 75 minutes
- Country: Canada
- Language: French

The Great Resistance (French: Au pays des colons) is a 2007 documentary film by Quebec film director Denys Desjardins. This length feature is produced by the National Film Board of Canada (NFB).

== Synopsis ==
In the 1930s, in the throes of the Great Depression, the government of Quebec relocated more than 80,000 citizens to found a new settlement in the virgin forests of Quebec's Abitibi region. After enduring backbreaking work to clear the land, however, many left, seeking a better life in the city or as labourers for the large corporations that had come to exploit the North's valuable resources. The Lalancette family, however, have persisted in forging their future on the land from one generation to the next, earning their keep from farming, and defying the constraints of globalization and the mining and forestry companies that control the area. Revisiting the heritage of Quebec filmmakers who documented Abitibi, following in the footsteps of Pierre Perrault, among others, this documentary traces a defining chapter of Quebec history and raises fundamental questions about regional development.

== Award ==
- Nominated in 2008 for a Jutra Award for Best Documentary.
