= Sami Frey =

French actor (born 1937)

- Born: Sami Frei; 13 October 1937 (age 88); Paris, France
- Occupation: Actor
- Years active: 1955–present

Sami Frey (born Sami Frei; 13 October 1937) is a French actor of Polish-Jewish descent. Among the films he starred in are En compagnie d'Antonin Artaud (1993), in which he portrays French poet and playwright Antonin Artaud, and Bande à part (1964) by Jean-Luc Godard.

== Selected filmography ==
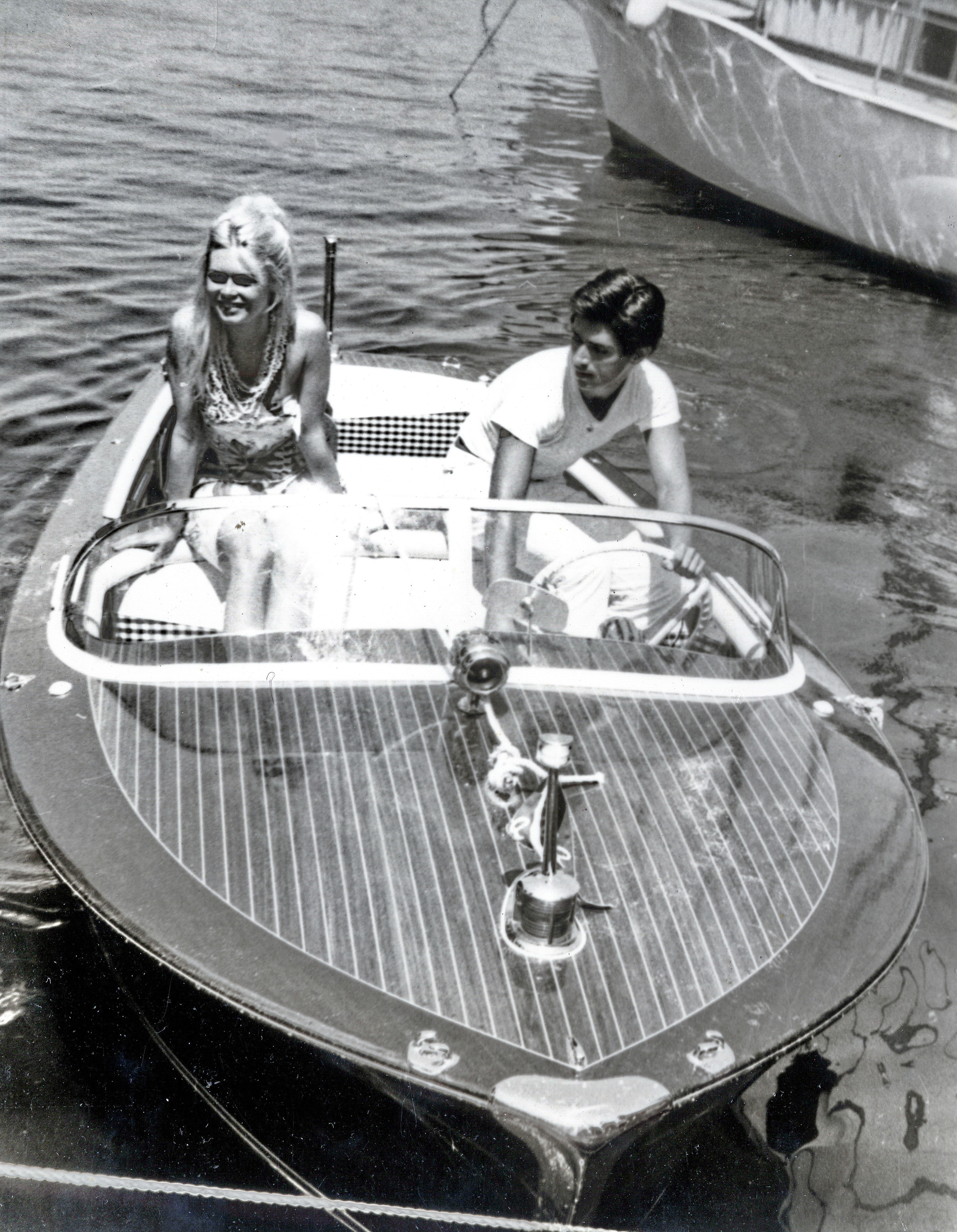
Frey and Brigitte Bardot in Saint-Tropez harbour in 1963

Year	Title	Role	Director
1960	The Truth	Gilbert Tellier	Henri-Georges Clouzot
1961	The Seven Deadly Sins (episode "Pride")	the lover	Roger Vadim
1961	Cléo from 5 to 7	a comedian	Agnès Varda
1962	Thérèse Desqueyroux	Jean Azevedo	Georges Franju
1963	Girl's Apartment	Tibère	Michel Deville
1964	Band of Outsiders	Franz	Jean-Luc Godard
1965	Who Are You, Polly Maggoo?	Prince Igor	William Klein
1966	Angelique and the King	Bachiatri Bey	Bernard Borderie
1967	Manon 70	Des Grieux	Jean Aurel
1968	Mr. Freedom	Christ	William Klein
1970	The Married Couple of the Year Two	the Marquis de Guéron	Jean-Paul Rappeneau
1971	M comme Mathieu	Mathieu	Jean-François Adam
1972	César and Rosalie	David	Claude Sautet
1974	Sweet Movie	El Macho	Dušan Makavejev
1975	The Garden That Tilts	Michel	Guy Gilles
1976	Néa (aka A Young Emmanuelle)	Axel Thorpe	Nelly Kaplan
1977	Pourquoi pas !	Fernand Bulard	Coline Serreau
1978	One Page of Love	François Karwitch	Maurice Rabinowicz
1978	Écoute voir	Arnaud de Maule	Hugo Santiago
1982	Deadly Circuit	Ralph Forbes	Claude Miller
1984	The Little Drummer Girl	Khalil	George Roy Hill
1984	Family Life	Emmanuel	Jacques Doillon
1986	Black Widow	Paul Nuytten	Bob Rafelson
1986	Laputa	Paul	Helma Sanders-Brahms
1986	State of Grace	Antoine Lombard	Jacques Rouffio
1987	Blood and Sand	Manuel Vasquez	Jeanne Labrune
1988	The Abyss	Prieur de Cordeliers	André Delvaux
1988	War and Remembrance (TV miniseries)	Avram Rabinovitz	Dan Curtis
1992	Hors Saison	the narrator	Daniel Schmid
1994	My Life and Times with Antonin Artaud	Antonin Artaud	Gérard Mordillat
1994	Revenge of the Musketeers	Aramis	Bertrand Tavernier
1996	The Liars	Marcus Dourmer	Élie Chouraqui
2000	Les Acteurs	Himself	Bertrand Blier
2004	Anthony Zimmer	Akerman	Jérôme Salle
2007	The Wedding Director	Ferdinando Gravina	Marco Bellocchio
2012	Le Nez dans le ruisseau	Auguste Stohler	Christophe Chevalier
2015	Marguerite and Julien	Abbot of Hambye	Valérie Donzelli
2017	Number One	Henri Blachey	Tonie Marshall
