= Raymond van het Groenewoud =

Belgian musician (born 1950)

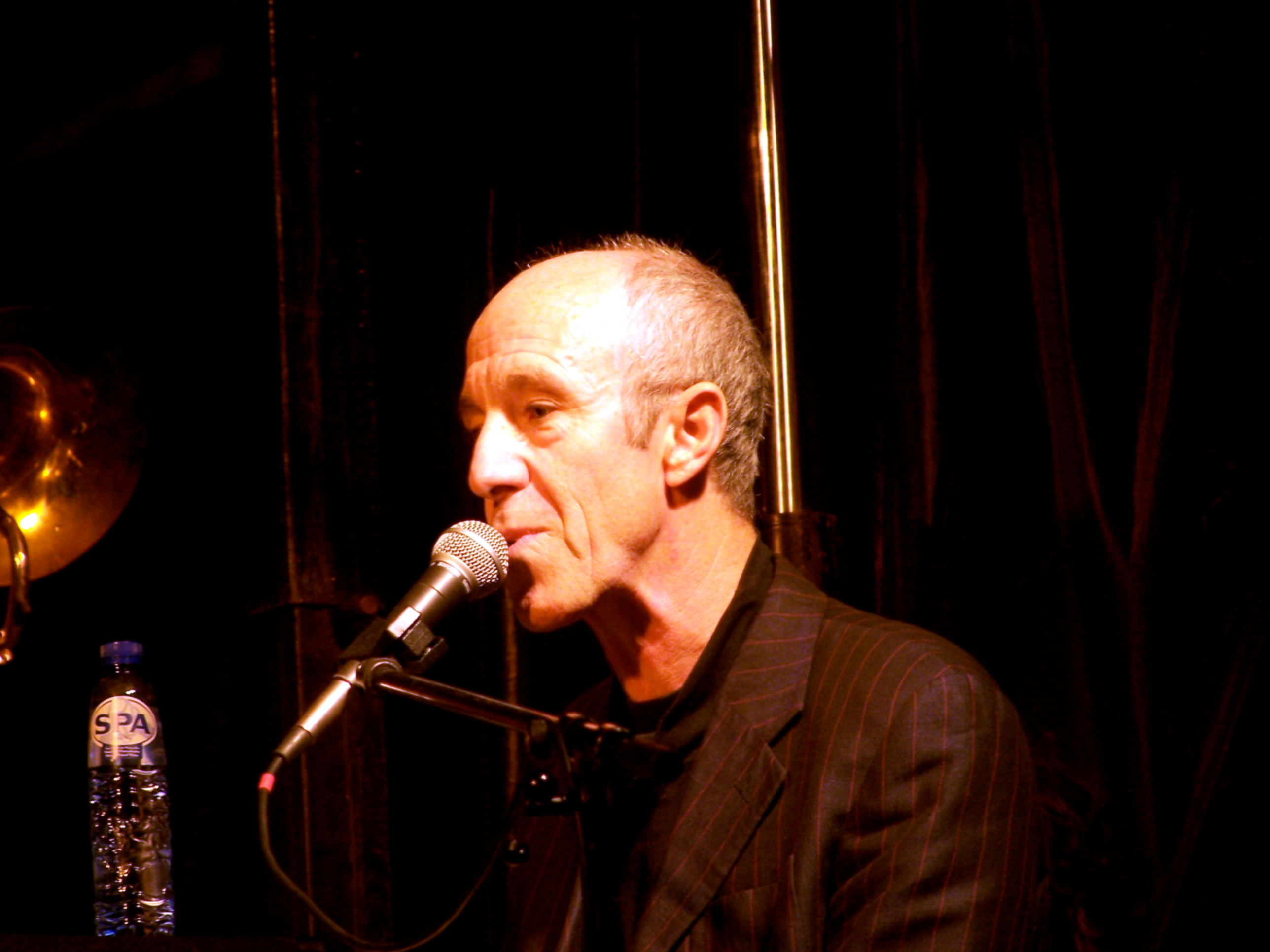
- Raymond van het Groenewoud (2006)

Background information
- Born: Raymond van het Groenewoud; 14 February 1950 (age 76); Schaerbeek, Belgium
- Genres: Alternative rock, rock and roll, gospel, Blues
- Occupations: Singer, instrumentalist, composer, songwriter
- Instruments: guitar, Piano
- Years active: 1972–present
- Website: raymondvanhetgroenewoud.be

Raymond van het Groenewoud (born 14 February 1950) is a Belgian musician. He was born in Schaerbeek, of Dutch descent, and he sings primarily in Dutch. His biggest hits include "Vlaanderen Boven", "Meisjes", "Je Veux de l'Amour", "Zjoske Schone Meid" and "Liefde voor Muziek". He refers to himself as a musician but also a poet, philosopher and clown.

== Career ==
His debut was as a guitar player with Johan Verminnen. In 1972 he started the group Louisette with Erik van Neygen. A number of solo albums followed, accompanied by his group De Centimeters. In 1977 he had his first hit record, the single "Meisjes" from the album Nooit Meer Drinken.

His lyrics are sometimes happy, sometimes sad, jovial or philosophical. In 1980 he had his first success in the Netherlands with a concert at the Pinkpop Festival and the hit "Je Veux de l'Amour".

He wrote the soundtrack for the film Brussels by Night by Marc Didden (1983).

In 1990 most of his songs were re-recorded for a compilation album, with a new single "Liefde voor Muziek", a parody of the gospel by James Brown in the movie The Blues Brothers. It reached number one in Belgium and the Netherlands.

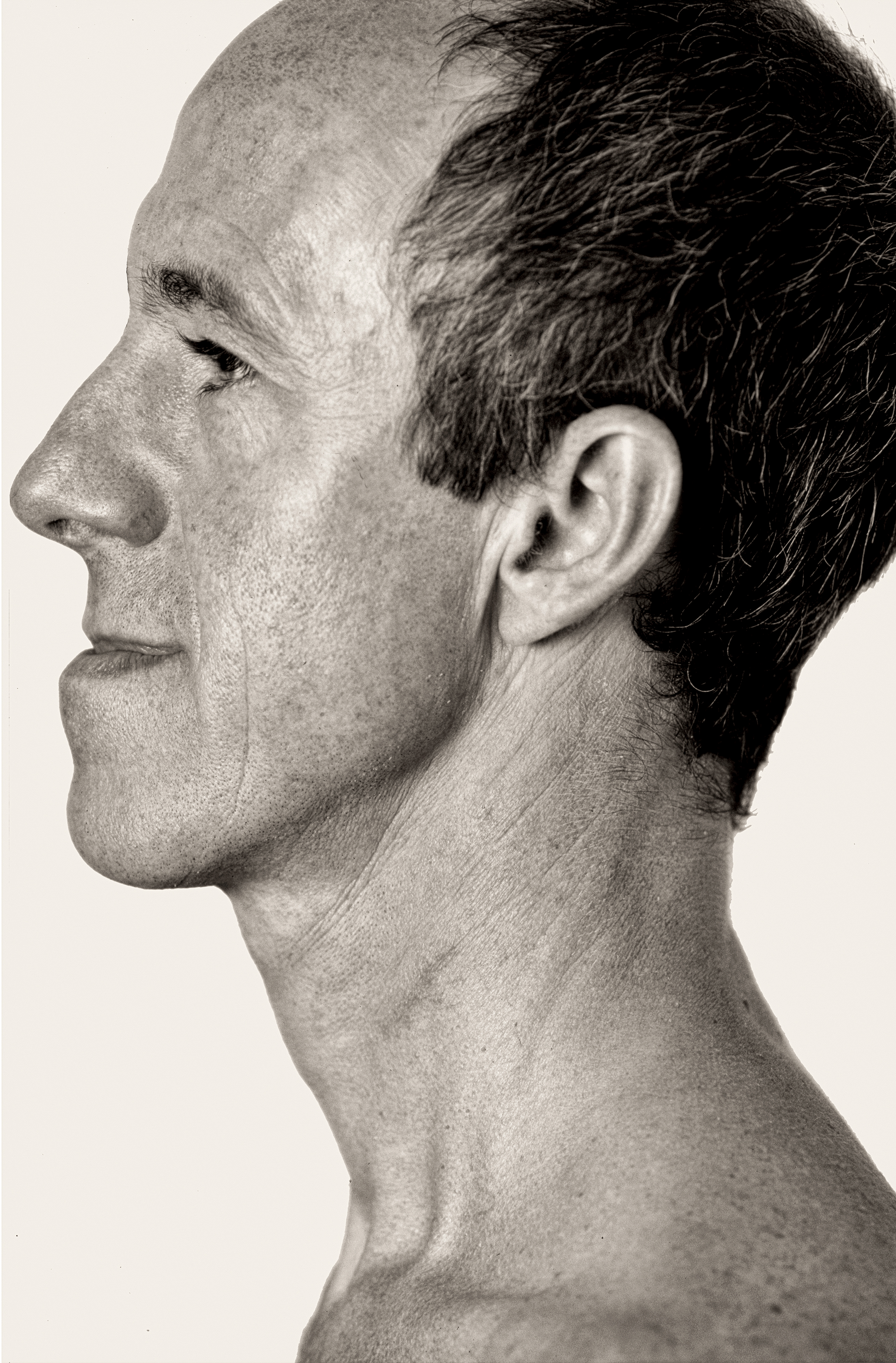
Van het Groenewoud in 1995

In the 2000s he became renowned for his protest songs, including the anti-Bush Weg met Amerika (Eng: Down with America) and "WapperSong", which rallied against the plans for Antwerp's Lange Wapper bridge.

To celebrate his 70th anniversary, a well received three-part documentary about his life and career, called Raymond! was broadcast by VRT (Belgium) and NTR (Netherlands) in 2020.

72-year old Van het Groenewoud and his band performed a nearly 8-hour long concert at the closure of the Gentse Feesten in 2022, playing 111 songs.

== Awards and honours ==
- Central artist at Nekka-Nacht: 1999 and 2010
- Radio 2 Hall of Fame: 2002 (song Chachacha), 2010 (career award)
- ZAMU career achievement award: 2004
- Golden medal of honor of the Flemish Parliament: 2007
- Music Industry Award: 2017 (career award)
- HUMO's pop poll: Best national singer of last 50 years: 2017
- SABAM Lifetime achievement award: 2022

== Discography ==
=== Albums ===
- Je moest eens weten hoe gelukkig ik was (1973)
- Ik doe niet mee (1975)
- Nooit meer drinken (1977)
- Ethisch reveil (1979)
- Leven en liefdes (1981)
- Brussels by Night (1984)
- Habba! (1984)
- Ontevreden (1986)
- Intiem (1988)
- Sensatie (1992)
- RvhGBox 10 (1993)
- Walhalla (1995)
- Ik ben God niet (1996)
- Liefde voor muziek (1996)
- Tot morgen (1998)
- Een jongen uit Schaarbeek (2001)
- Ballades (2004)
- Meneer Raymond (2005)
- Feest! Live! (2008)
- De laatste rit (2011)
- Allermooist Op Aard (2017)
- Speel (2020)
- Egoïst (2023)

=== Compilation albums ===
- Meisjes (Het beste van Raymond van het Groenewoud) (1990)
- Het beste van Raymond van het Groenewoud (1974-1976) (1999)
- Alle 40 Goed (2010)
- Essential (2011)
- Archivaris (2018)

=== Live ===
- Kamiel in België (1978)
- De minister van ruimtelijke ordening (1994)
- Live Zoals het Is (2008)
- Live in de AB (2013)

=== Soundtracks ===
- Brussels by Night (1983)
- Walhalla (1995)
- Iedereen Beroemd (2000)

=== Singles ===
- "Meisjes" (1977)
- "Vlaanderen boven" (1978)
- "Je Veux de l'Amour" (1980)
- "Cha cha cha" (1981)
- "Stapelgek op jou" (1985)
- "Ik ben de man" (1990)
- "Meisjes (nieuwe versie)" (1990)
- "Liefde voor muziek" (1991)
- "Warme dagen" (1992)
- "l'Etranger, c'est mon ami" (1993)
- "Vlaanderen boven (nieuwe versie)" (2002)
- "Zoals gewoonlijk" (2004)
- "Wat een fijne dag / Het zou niet mogen zijn" (2010)
- "Goeiemorgen ouwe rotkop" (2011)
- "Jouw liefde" (2011)
- "Schandalig content" (2015)
- "Omdat ik van je hou (nieuwe versie)" (2015)
- "Deze blanke jongen komt zo hard" (2016)
- "Meisjes (nieuwe versie)" (2017)
- "Vallen en opstaan" (2017)
- "Bonestaakdans" (2017)
- "Er is er geen één zoals jij)" (2018)
- "Spiegel" (2018)
- "Wat je doet met mij" (2019)
- "Bitter en bot" (2020)
- "Het is zo fijn wanneer je nergens aan denkt" (2020)
- "Tegenwoordig" (2020)
- "Gewoon in Amsterdam" (2020)
- "Ademen" (2021)

=== DVDs ===
- Live in Antwerpen (2004)
