= One Page of Love =

1978 film

- Theatrical release poster
- Directed by: Maurice Rabinowicz
- Written by: Maurice Rabinowicz; Yvette Michelems
- Starring: Ève Bonfanti
- Cinematography: Jean-Jacques Mathy
- Release date: 1978
- Running time: 93 minutes
- Countries: France; Belgium
- Language: French

One Page of Love (French: Une page d'amour) is a 1978 French-Belgian film directed by Maurice Rabinowicz. It was entered into the 28th Berlin International Film Festival.

== Cast ==
- Ève Bonfanti - Anna
- Adrian Brine - Policier
- Geraldine Chaplin - Lise
- Alexandra Clabots - Grand-mère
- Roland Mahauden - Infirmier
- Marcel Dalio - Père de Fanny
- Jan Decleir - Ouvrier
- Pierre Dumaine - Infirmier
- Sami Frey - François Karwitch
- Niusia Gold - Mère
- Zelman Koletshnikov - Père de François
- Severyn Lipszyc - Oncle
- Esther Loszica - Belle-soeur
- Monette Loza - Fanny
