= Vase de Noces =

1974 Belgian exploitation horror film by Thierry Zéno

- DVD cover
- Directed by: Thierry Zéno
- Written by: Thierry Zéno; Dominique Garny
- Produced by: Thierry Zéno
- Starring: Dominique Garny
- Cinematography: Thierry Zéno
- Edited by: Thierry Zéno
- Music by: Alain Pierre
- Distributed by: Zéno Films
- Release date: 1974
- Running time: 80 minutes

Vase de Noces (also known as Wedding Trough and The Pig Fucking Movie) is a 1974 Belgian exploitation horror film directed by Thierry Zéno and starring Dominique Garny.

The film deals openly, and sometimes graphically, with zoophilia. It features both real and simulated animal killings and coprophagia, and has been labeled obscene by many sources, including by the OFLC of Australia. The film was banned in Australia by the Australian Classification Board in the mid 1970s with two failed attempts, according to the Australian Classification Board. The film went before the Australian Classification Board on 1 April 1977, and was banned again for the third time. The ban status on the film in Australia has remained largely unchanged since then, due to in part that the film violates Australian obscenity laws.

== Plot ==
The film follows a man who lives alone on a farm in rural Belgium. He demonstrates bizarre behavior from the beginning, such as fastening doll's heads to pigeons, collecting his feces in glass jars and beheading a hen for his own amusement. He is also obsessed with a sow who lives on the farm.

Gleefully, he rolls around in the manure with the sow, then he rapes her, with his behavior suggesting he sees as an intimate and mutually agreeable act. Later, the sow gives birth to a litter of piglets. The man attempts to spoon-feed milk to the piglets, but the piglets prefer to drink directly from the milk bowl. In general, the piglets prefer their mother's company, repeatedly scorning the man's advances. Taking this rejection as an unforgivable personal slight, the man hangs the piglets and leaves their bodies strung up in the open. When the sow discovers the remains of the piglets, she runs madly around the farm squealing. The sow slips into a deep patch in the mud and drowns there.

The man searches for the sow, and becomes visibly distraught when he discovers her dead. He drags the body from the mud, buries it on the farm grounds, and crudely attempts to bury himself on a patch of ground nearby. He gets up, and his grief turns to rage. He rushes around the farm scattering and smashing his belongings from the house, including his jars of waste.

He prepares and vigorously consumes a "tea" made of feces and urine, determinedly climbs a ladder in the barn and hangs himself with a rope. The final scene depicts his spirit floating skyward.

== Cast ==
- Dominique Garny as man

== Distribution ==
Better known by the English title Wedding Trough, the film has never had an official theater release, but had been shown in film festivals around the world, including at the Perth International Film Festival in 1975, with the screening upsetting Australian censors.

Because there was no official theatrical, VHS, or until the 21st century, DVD release, Wedding Trough is one of the most obscure movies that is not a lost film.

Its last film festival appearance was at the 61st Locarno International Film Festival in "Tribute to the Royal Belgian Cinémathèque / Experimental film Competitions of Knokke le Zoute".

German video distributor Camera Obscura and Swedish distributor Njuta Films each released the film on DVD.

== Censorship in Australia ==
In Australia, the Perth International Film Festival scheduled a screening of Vase de Noces in 1975. At the time, film festival submissions did not require approval from Australian censors, however the Western Australian government pressured censors to review the film before the screening. The censors did so, and subsequently refused to classify the film on grounds of obscenity. Festival chairman David Roe and director Thierry Zéno appealed to the censors to reconsider. Though their appeal was successful, and the film was shown in the festival, the Western Australian Government was not happy that the festival went ahead with the screening. Thus, this incident created a precedent for animosity between the two groups for years to come.

The government of Western Australia urged the Perth Film Festival to discontinue their plans to screen Nagisa Oshima's In the Realm of the Senses, threatening that future festivals would be subject to thorough censorial review in advance, if they went ahead with the screening. As a result of this pressure, the Perth Film Festival decided not to screen Oshima's film. Film festivals in Melbourne and Sydney went on to screen In the Realm of the Senses without incident. On 17 December 1976, Vase de Noces went before the Australian censors again, and again received a judgment of "refused classification". A third such attempt was made on 1 April 1977, resulting once again in a rejection, effectively banning its reproduction and dissemination throughout Australia. The film remains banned throughout Australia to this day after more than 40 years of being banned nationwide in the country and this ruling has not been successfully appealed.
