= Josse De Pauw =

Belgian actor (born 1952)

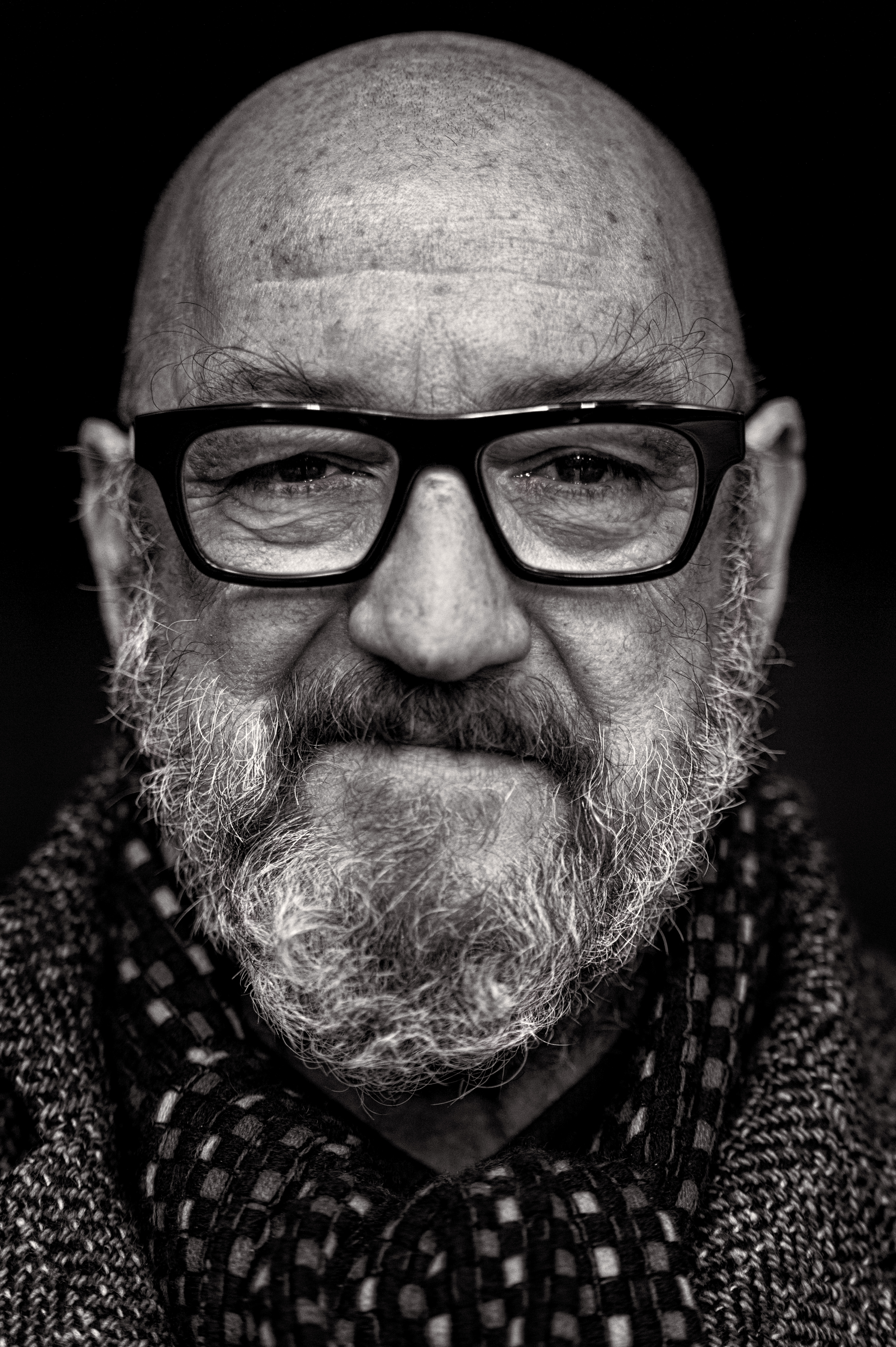
- Born: 15 March 1952 (age 74); Asse, Belgium
- Occupations: actor, artist

Josse De Pauw (born 15 March 1952) is a versatile Belgian actor, film director, dramatist, author and columnist. He was married to modern dance performer Fumio Ikeda for over thirty years.

== Theatre ==
After graduating from the Royal Conservatory in Brussels De Pauw founded the mime theatre group Radeis International (1976), and after that Schaamte, the theatre company that would be the start of the Brussels Kaaitheater. He both writes and performs in highly regarded theatre plays such as Larf and Weg (both with music by Peter Vermeersch, and has received many awards for his works, such as the Océ Podium Prize for his entire oeuvre in 2000. He has led theatre companies such as Het Net (Bruges), Victoria (Ghent) and Het Toneelhuis (Antwerp). With the latter company, he played the main role in "Tenebrous Heart", after Joseph Conrad's novel, performed in Paris in 2011. Throughout his career he has collaborated with various actors, directors, writers and artists, such as Tom Jansen, Dirk Roofthooft, Luk Perceval, Guy Cassiers, Jan Decorte, Jürgen Gosh, Jan Ritsema, Jan Lauwers, Manu Riche, Peter Vermeersch and FES, Claire Chevallier, George van Dam, Jan Kuijken, Eric Thielemans, Rudy Trouvé, Roland Van Campenhout, Collegium Vocale, I Solisti del Vento and many more. It is said that from 2017 he will work on a trilogy in collaboration with LODcomposers Dominique Pauwels, Jan Kuijken and Kris Defoort. The first part of the trilogy or "Trifonie"(as called by De Pauw) will be called Heroes (in Dutch: De Helden) and will deal with the theme of heroism and its role in today's society.

== Movies ==
Josse De Pauw starred in his first major movie part in 1989. After that he has played in about 50 movies, among them most of the movies by Belgian director Dominique Deruddere, including Crazy Love, Kaas (Cheese), Hombres Complicados, Wait Until Spring, Bandini and Iedereen Beroemd! (Everybody Famous). This last movie was nominated for Best Foreign Language Film at the 2000 Academy Awards. He played the Ringmaster in Philip Ridley's English-language thriller The Passion of Darkly Noon. De Pauw directed two movies of his own: Vinaya and Übung.

== Filmography ==
- 2019 – Patrick (De Patrick)
- 2017 – Cargo
- 2016 – Everybody Happy
- 2014 – Flying Home
- 2006 – Crusade in Jeans (Kruistocht in spijkerbroek)
- 2005 – Someone Else's Happiness (Een ander zijn geluk)
- 2004 – The Kiss (De kus)
- 2004 – 25 degrés en hiver
- 2003 – De vreemde Mann
- 2001 – Verboden te zuchten
- 2000 – Wild Mussels
- 2000 – Everybody's Famous! (Iedereen beroemd!)
- 1999 – Pour toujours
- 1999 – Kaas
- 1998 – Hombres Complicados
- 1996 – Zwarte sneeuw, TV
- 1996 – Jeunesse sans dieu, TV
- 1995 – The Passion of Darkly Noon
- 1995 – The Flying Dutchman (De vliegende Hollander)
- 1995 – Last Call (Hoogste Tijd)
- 1994 – Just Friends
- 1993 – Aan Zee
- 1992 – L’Ordre de jour
- 1991 – Toto le héros
- 1989 – Wait Until Spring, Bandini
- 1987 – Crazy Love
- 1986 – De Wisselwachter
- 1985 – Wildshut
- 1984 – De stille Oceaan

== Books ==
Josse De Pauw has also published two books, consisting of his theatre plays intermingled with popular short stories from daily life: Werk (Work) and Nog (More). Werk was nominated for the Gouden Uil in 2000.
