= Flying Home (film) =

2014 romantic drama film

- Belgian theatrical release poster
- Directed by: Dominique Deruddere
- Written by: Dominique Deruddere
- Produced by: Dominique Deruddere; Ludo Poppe
- Starring: Jamie Dornan; Charlotte De Bruyne
- Cinematography: Frank van den Eeden
- Edited by: Els Voorspoels
- Music by: Wolfram de Marco
- Production companies: Otomatic; Mauna Kea Films; Kanakna Productions; Twenty Four 9 Films; GL Films
- Distributed by: KFD
- Release date: 2 April 2014 (Belgium)
- Running time: 95 minutes
- Countries: Belgium; Germany
- Languages: English; Dutch

Flying Home (a.k.a. Racing Hearts) is a 2014 romantic drama film directed by Dominique Deruddere and also written by Dominique Deruddere. The film was released on 2 April 2014.

== Plot ==
A sheikh from Dubai wants to buy the Flemish homing pigeon Wittekop, which is owned by Jos Pauwels, and uses an American middleman named Colin to make the deal. Although Jos is not interested in selling the pigeon, his granddaughter Isabelle is clearly interested in Colin.

== Cast ==
- Jan Decleir as Jos Pauwels
- Charlotte De Bruyne as Isabelle Pauwels
- Jamie Dornan as Colin Montgomery
- Anthony Head as Mr. Montgomery
- Sharon Maughan as Mrs. Montgomery
- Josse De Pauw as Priest
- Viviane De Muynck as Martha
- Eline Van der Velden as Celia
- Piet Fuchs as Mr. Conrad
- Max Pirkis as Jason
- Mitchell Mullen as Walden
- Ali Suliman as the Sheikh
- Omar bin Haider as the Sheikh's right-hand man
- Numan Acar as Karadeniz
