= François Beukelaers =

Belgian actor (1938–2026)

- Born: 2 February 1938; Vilvoorde, Belgium
- Died: February 2026 (aged 87–88)
- Education: Studio Herman Teirlinck
- Occupations: Actor, stage director, singer, educator
- Years active: 1965–2026
- Awards: Lifetime Achievement Award, Ostend Film Festival (2023)

François Beukelaers (2 February 1938 – February 2026) was a Belgian actor, stage director and singer.

== Life and career ==
Beukelaers was born in Vilvoorde on 2 February 1938. Herman Teirlinck convinced him to study theatre at the studio of the National Theatre in Antwerp, later called the Studio Herman Teirlinck. He later became a teacher at the same studio (whose students included Johan Leysen, Dirk Roofthoeft and Jean Bervoets), and also taught directing at the theatre school INSAS.

In 1965, Beukelaers made his debut as a professional director at the Antwerp KNS with Thornton Wilder's "Our Town".

Throughout his career, he acted in a number of feature films, including Brussels by Night (1983), The Over-the-Hill Band (2009) and Stormforce (2006).

Beukelaers received a Lifetime Achievement Award at the 2023 Ostend Film Festival.

On 4 February 2026, it was announced that Beukelaers had died at the age of 88.

== Filmography ==
=== Films ===
- The Man Who Had His Hair Cut Short (1966) as Patient
- One Night... A Train (1968) as Val
- Belle (1973) as the false stranger
- Brussels by Night (1983) as Max
- Istanbul (1985) as Joseph
- Crazy Love (1987) as the doctor
- Wait Until Spring, Bandini (1989) as Mr. Helmer
- Flodder 3 (1995) as Reinoud de Graaff
- Hombres Complicados (1997) as Lucien
- Oesje! (1997) as Raymond Stasse
- Pauline and Paulette (2001)
- Stormforce (2006) as Cassiman
- Ex Drummer (2007) as Pa Verbeek
- JCVD (2008)
- The Over-the-Hill Band (2009) as Jean
- The Vintner's Luck (2009) as Chief Winemaker
