= Anna Frijters =

Belgian screenwriter, producer, director and author

- Born: Anna Veldrs; 1889
- Died: 1966 (aged 76–77)
- Occupations: screenwriter, producer, director and author

Anna Frijters (née Velders; 1889–1966) was a Belgian screenwriter, producer, director and author, known for silent films Leentje van de zee (1928) and De verloofde uit Canada (1934) which she wrote, produced and directed with her husband François Frijters in the late 1920s. She was also known as one of the early female screenwriters, who played an important role in pioneering the development of scriptwriting in the Belgium film industry.

== Early life and career ==
Before beginning their filmmaking careers, Anna and François Frijters were both diamond cutters in Antwerp and passionate about making their own films. Moving to the United States, they met with Ruth Roland, an American actress who starred in a number of silent films. Ruth Roland encouraged Anna Frijters to enter a screenplay competition arranged by Brewster Publications, where she won the second prize for her screenplay called Leentje van de zee (Peggy of the Sea). Her victory in this competition created largely critical receptions. Jule Selbo pointed out that Motion Picture Magazine, described her entry as puny, and showed its reaction as follows:

And look, the puny entry from this tiny country attracted the attention of the jury. In the classic country of the Silent Art it was not considered as futile as some suggested over here. It even passed a second selection round and after the third... it remained intact and undamaged, claiming the laurel. The puny entry has become a screenplay approved by American professionals.

This success also paved the way for a wide range of offers coming from studios in the United States. She rejected all these offers because she wanted to follow her own path and pursue her filmmaking career with her husband François Frijters. At the same time, she did not want the American studios to influence her vision.

== Leentje van de zee (Peggy of the Sea) ==
With the help of their friends, the couple built a studio called Little Roland Studio in a suburb of Antwerp, where they planned to film Leentje van de zee (Peggy of the Sea) The film tells the story of a young girl who survived a shipwreck and was adopted by a fisherman. The fisherman was later accused of murdering a young boy who tried to seduce the girl.

=== Production ===
Anna and François Frijters sold their house in order to make an investment for the film. The filming began in 1926 in St. Anneke, De Panne and inside the Liberty movie theatre. Victor Beng and Antoine Laureys assisted Frijters behind the camera. At Roland's request, Max Factor, who was the make-up artist in the film, came from Hollywood and joined the production. However, the couple went through some rough times completing the film. Due to budgetary problems and limited production facilities in the studio, the crew and cast consisted of amateurs who were only able complete the shooting outside of working hours. In addition, the filming was also postponed several times due to some other drawn-out problems such as the storm that damaged the building and the pregnancy of the lead actress Ive Bramé. The production, as a result, lasted two years and had its premiere in the cinema of Antwerp Zoo in 1928.

=== Distribution ===
Frijters decided to make the distribution on her own as she was rejected by the film distributors in Brussels. Her efforts of distributing the film yielded results to a certain extent, having her film released by only sub-run theaters in Belgium. She used patriotic slogans as a way of advertising her film and gaining the support of locals.

=== Reception ===
The final result did not meet Frijters' expectations due to the arrival of sound film that overshadowed the film's public interest as well as the mainly negative reviews written about the film itself. In September 1929, Close Up magazine shared a small review that intended to disgrace the content of the film.

In Antwerp, the Flemish Cinema Club has produced a film Leentje van de Zee (Peggy of the Sea), which I went to view thinking here might be the rudiments of a folk-film, if not a realized folk-film. The Dutch film Breakers possessed a dignity and seriousness of effort. But this film of amateurs with its ancient story of childhood love, the drunkard foe, the false accusation of murder, the crippled idiot's devotion and martyrdom was hilariously stupid. Nothing to redeem it, not even an honest intention. Yet for as little an expenditure these amateurs might have produced a document of some Flemish village which might have taught them just what material they possess.

— Kenneth Macpherson, Close Up, September 1929

== De verloofde uit Canada (The Fiancé from Canada) ==
Anna Frijters was discouraged from maintaining her interest in filmmaking after the critical and commercial backlash of Leentje van de Zee, though her husband, François Frijters, made a Newsreel film called Inhuldiging van het standbeeld van Guido Gezelle (Inauguration of the Statue of Guido Gezelle) in 1930. However, Frijters wrote a short comedy screenplay called De verloofde uit Canada (The Fiancé from Canada), which revolved around a working-class man who returned home from Canada and discovered that his fiancée Betty no longer loved him and was married to someone else. The main character was played by a comedian, Lowieke Staal.

=== Production ===
Filming began throughout 1929 and 1930 in various locations of Belgium such as the World's Fair in Borsbeek and the warehouse at the Keyserlei, which is known as a prominent boulevard in Antwerp. However, the production process of the film was also problematic, due to the choice of amateur actors in the cast and their inflexible availabilities, which caused disagreements and replacements among the crew members. In addition, the post-production process lasted four years because of the lack of budget, causing the film to have its test screening in 1934.

As compared to the failure of her 1928 film, this film was given a green light to be scored by J. Antoon Zwijsen as a result of its successful test screening. However, the process was interrupted by a massive fire that destroyed the entire studio. Only the Zwijsen's musical score survived but the fire permanently marked the end of the Frijters' filmmaking career. Throughout history, De verloofde uit Canada was remembered as a creative experiment with its combination of animated and conventional images.

== Lost copies ==
It was later discovered that the only son of the Frijters family, Roland, kept the copies of both films in his basement. These copies were later restored for their premiere at the Flanders International Film Festival in Gent in October 1986, with the participation of the cast of Leentje van de Zee.

== Filmography ==
=== Writer ===
Year	Film	Notes
1928	Leentje van de zee (Peggy of the Sea)	Her screenplay won second prize at Brewster Publications screenwriting contest in 1925, however, the film was a critical and commercial failure.
1934	De verloofde uit Canada (The Fiancé from Canada)	After a successful screening, the film was ready to be scored, however, it was completely destroyed during the fire at the studio. Only the musical score survived.
