= Thierry Zéno =

Belgian author and filmmaker (1950–2017)

- Born: 22 April 1950; Namur, Belgium
- Died: 7 June 2017 (aged 67)
- Occupations: Author, filmmaker

Thierry Zéno (born Thierry Jonard; 22 April 1950 – 7 June 2017) was a Belgian author-filmmaker.

His films include the controversial horror film Vase de Noces (1974), and a documentary ¡Ya basta! Le cri des sans-visage (1995–1997) on the Zapatista rebels of Chiapas, Mexico.

His fascination with artists is reflected in his works Les muses sataniques (1983), Ce tant bizarre Monsieur Rops (2000) and Eugène Ionesco, voix et silences (1987).

Zéno created a "video" department at the Académie de Dessin et des Arts décoratifs de Molenbeek-Saint-Jean, where he was a teacher from 1985 to 1999, and was the director beginning in 1999.

He died on 7 June 2017.

== Filmography ==
=== Actor ===
- Babel / Lettre à mes amis restés en Belgique de Boris Lehman (1991)
- Album 1 de Boris Lehman (1974)

=== Director ===
- Bouche sans fond ouverte sur les horizons (1971, court-métrage)
- Vase de noces (1974)
- Des morts (1979)
- Les muses sataniques (1983)
- Les Tribulations de saint Antoine (1984)
- Artifices d'acier (1986)
- Eugène Ionesco, voix et silences (1987)
- Chroniques d'un village Tzotzil (1992)
- ¡Ya Basta! Le cri des sans-visage (1997)
- Ce tant bizarre monsieur Rops (2000)
