= Direction Lourdes =

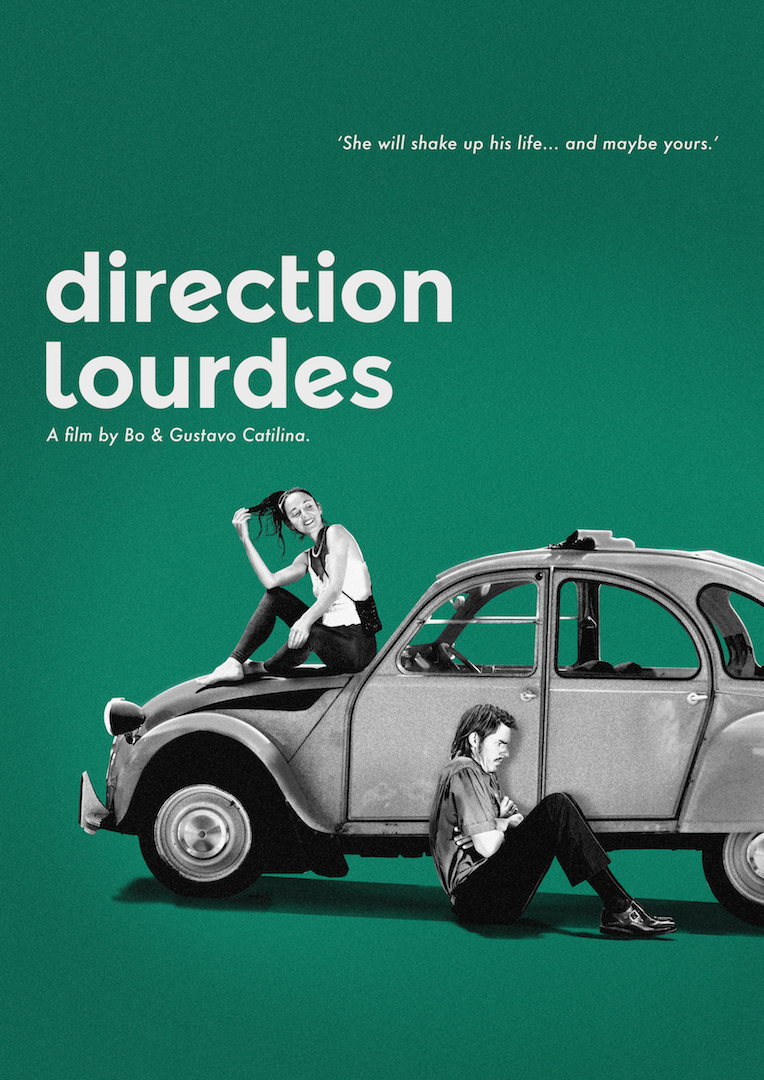
- Official Poster Direction Lourdes
- Directed by: Bo & Gustavo Catilina
- Written by: Bo & Gustavo Catilina; Christian Biget
- Starring: Bo Catilina; Gustavo Catilina; Wilfried Vandamme; Jurgen Deweerd; Michel Gabriels; Barbara Axters
- Music by: Bo & Gustavo Catilina
- Production company: BogusCat Productions
- Release date: 13 December 2017
- Running time: 60 minutes
- Countries: Belgium, France
- Language: French

Direction Lourdes is a Belgian-French road movie directed by Bo & Gustavo Catilina in 2017.

== Plot ==
Leopold is an old adolescent. He still lives under the mighty influence of his aging and ailing father who will die very soon. If he dies, Leopold's structured and ordered world will collapse. He has to save his father but in order to do that he needs a miracle.

For the first time in his life, Leopold takes destiny in his own two hands and makes a trip from Belgium to Lourdes with his father's fancy Rover.

At the very beginning of his trip, he stumbles on a broken down 2CV and its driver: Lola. Lola joins Leopold on a memorable road trip to Lourdes. One journey, many adventures, many challenges, two different characters meet: Leo, serious, fearful, crushed under dogmas, Lola, wild, spontaneous and full of trust.
