= Bo & Gustavo Catilina =

Belgian film director couple

Bo & Gustavo Catilina are a Belgian film director couple. Their two debut feature films, that they produced simultaneously, are Direction Lourdes (2017) and Bonnie&Clyde Copycats (2017).

Their first animated short film: The Flight of the Humble Bee was selected for numerous film festivals, including the Wildlife Conservation film festival in New York City.

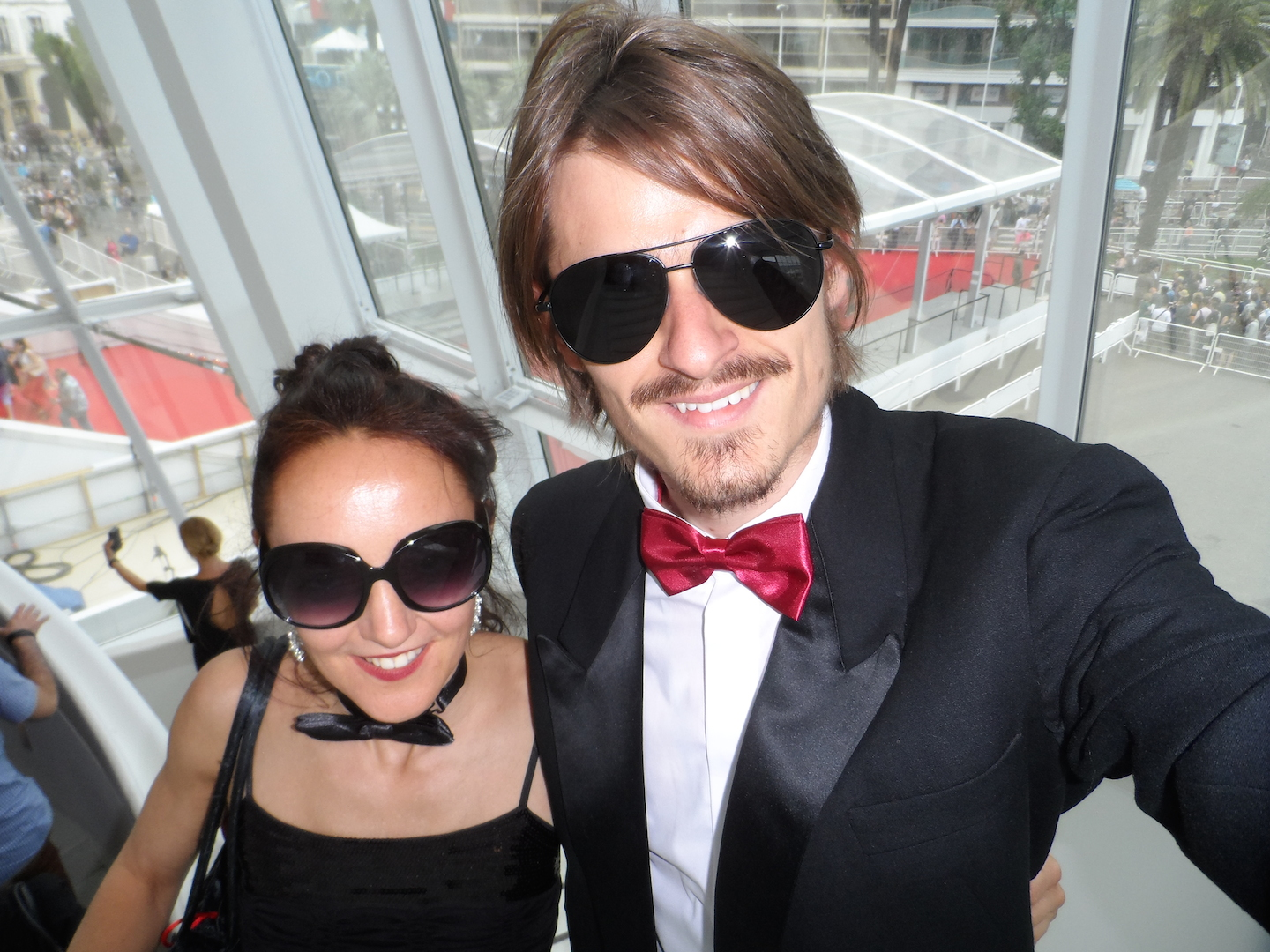
Bo & Gustavo Catilina at the Cannes film festival 2015

With Bonnie&Clyde Copycats they've filmed the first 'car chase with gunfire' ever in the historic center of Bruges.
