= Ernst Moerman =

Belgian writer and film director

Ernst Moerman (1897–1944) was a Belgian poetry writer and film director. He directed only one film, Monsieur Fantômas in 1937.

== Biography ==
During the 1920s, he was close to the Paris surrealist group, and wrote a theater play blending Tristan and Iseult, La vie imaginaire de Jésus-Christ and Fantômas 33. His film Monsieur Fantômas premiered on 12 October 1937 at the Royal Museums of Fine Arts of Belgium. René Magritte featured in this film.

== Publications ==
- Ernst Moerman (1933). Fantômas 1933. Les cahiers du "Journal des poètes".
- Ernst Moerman (1970). Oeuvre poétique: Ernst Moerman. André De Rache.

== Filmography ==
- Monsieur Fantômas, 1937 (director, screenwriter, actor)
