= Maurice Rabinowicz =

Belgian film director and writer

- Born: 23 August 1947 (age 78); Brussels, Belgium
- Occupations: film director, writer

Maurice Rabinowicz (born 23 August 1947) is a Belgian film director and writer.

He studied theatre at the Institut national supérieur des arts du spectacle (INSAS) in Brussels, graduating in 1970. His style of film-making has been described as Brechtian. His 1978 film One Page of Love was entered into the 28th Berlin International Film Festival.

== Filmography ==
- Nègre (1968)
- Canal K (1970) – with Boris Lehman
- Le Nosferat ou les eaux glacées de calcul égoïste (1975)
- Des anges et des démons (1978)
- Une page d'amour (One Page of Love) (1978) – with Sami Frey and Geraldine Chaplin
- Une femme en fuite (1982) – with Marie Dubois
