= Roland Lethem =

Belgian filmmaker and writer (born 1942)

Roland Lethem (born 1942) is a Belgian filmmaker and writer.

Influenced at his beginnings by Buñuel, Cocteau, the surrealists and by the Japanese cinema (Seijun Suzuki, Ishirō Honda, Kōji Wakamatsu, Yoko Ono), stunned by the Festival of the Film Expérimental of Knokke in 1967 and by May 1968, Roland Lethem's artistic aim is to push people to look at their possessions and place them in front of their responsibilities. Through violence, pornography and cruelty of some scenes, Roland Lethem's style is humorous. The work of Roland Lethem evolves, becomes political, ecological. La Ballade des amants maudits (The Ballad of the cursed lovers, 1966) or La Fée sanguinaire (The Bloodthirsty Fairy, 1968) still tell stories. Les Souffrances d'un oeuf meurtri (The Sufferings of a ravaged Egg, 1967), poem of love in several parts (Étoiles/Stars, Corps/Bodies, Hymen/Marriage or Hymen (ambiguous in French), Oeuf/Egg) is dedicated to all who conceive and to all who are conceived.

Some of the titles of his films include Le Saigneur est avec nous and Le sexe enragé. There are several thorough studies published on his films (Cinema/London, Skoop/Amsterdam) and Bandes de cons! (Bunch of Assholes!, 1970), his most famous film, was the subject of a seminar at the University of Amsterdam.

He frequently collaborated with Jean-Pierre Bouyxou and Jio Berk.

== Awards ==
La Double Insomnie & Lili au Lit. Prix M. Fraikin for originality of cinematographic language at 2nd Prix du Jeune Cinéma Belge, La Louvière 1966.

Les Souffrances d'un Œuf Meurtri Selected for the 4th Compétition Internationale du Film Expérimental, Knokke 1967–68, 3rd Prize of Jeune Cinéma Belge. La Louvière 1968, Sélectionné au Festival d'Oberhausen, 1968

La Fée Sanguinaire. Prix d'Excellence of Ciné-Club Europa, Bruxelles 1969 Sélectionné au Festival d'Oberhausen 1969, invitation to Underground Festival of London 1971

Le Sexe Enragé "One Night Stand Award" at the first Wet Dream Film Festival d'Amsterdam, 197, invited to the Biennale underground de Venise 1971; invited to the Underground Festival of London 1971

Le Vampire de la Cinémathèque invitations to the Quinzaine des Réalisateurs, Cannes 1971, Underground Festival of London 1971, and Festival der Struktural Film, Hamburg 1972

Le Saigneur est avec Nous : "Prix de la Presse—Lucien Deroisy" at the 10th Festival National du Cinema Belge, Bruxelles 1974

A group of films : Festival "Sigma", Bordeaux,: invitation to the Journées du Film Surréaliste, Toulon 1974

Le Sexe Enragé & La Fée Sanguinaire: I: invitations to the Festival du Film Tabou, Amsterdam~Utrecht, 1980, Festival de l'Imaginaire et de la Science—Fiction à Madrid, 1980, & Journées du Film Anarchiste, Gent, 1981

His work as a whole : Awarded a special Prize by l'Académie Morlock, Paris, 1980
