= Bert Beyens =

Belgian filmmaker

Bert Beyens (°1956) is a Belgian filmmaker, known for Jan Cox A Painter's Odyssey (written and directed with Pierre De Clercq, Belgium The Netherlands 1988), and A la Rencontre de Marcel Hanoun (France 1994). He teaches writing and directing at RITS since 1993. Between 2001 and 2013 he was the head of RITS, Erasmus University College Brussels. He was Vice President for Finance and Fundraising CILECT (The International Association of Film and Television Schools) between 2008 and 2010. Since 2014 Bert Beyens is the Chair of the Executive Council of GEECT (Groupement Européen des Ecoles de Cinéma et de Télévision/European Grouping of Film and Television Schools), and prior to that held the post of treasurer (2010–2014). In addition he is also a member of the European Film Academy.
