= Samy Szlingerbaum =

Belgian screenwriter, actor, and film director

Samy Szlingerbaum (1950–1986) was a Belgian screenwriter, actor and film director.

== Career ==
Szlingerbaum began his career as a director by co-directing the 1973 film Le 15/8 with Chantal Akerman. Then in 1980 he wrote and directed Brussels Transit, a feature film in Yiddish which tells of his parents moving to Brussels and making their life there after World War II. The film starred Hélène Lapiower and Boris Lehman.

== Prizes ==
- Brussels Transit: (Rotterdam 81: Prix de la presse; Berlin 81: Prix de l'OCIC).
