= Marc Didden =

Belgian film director

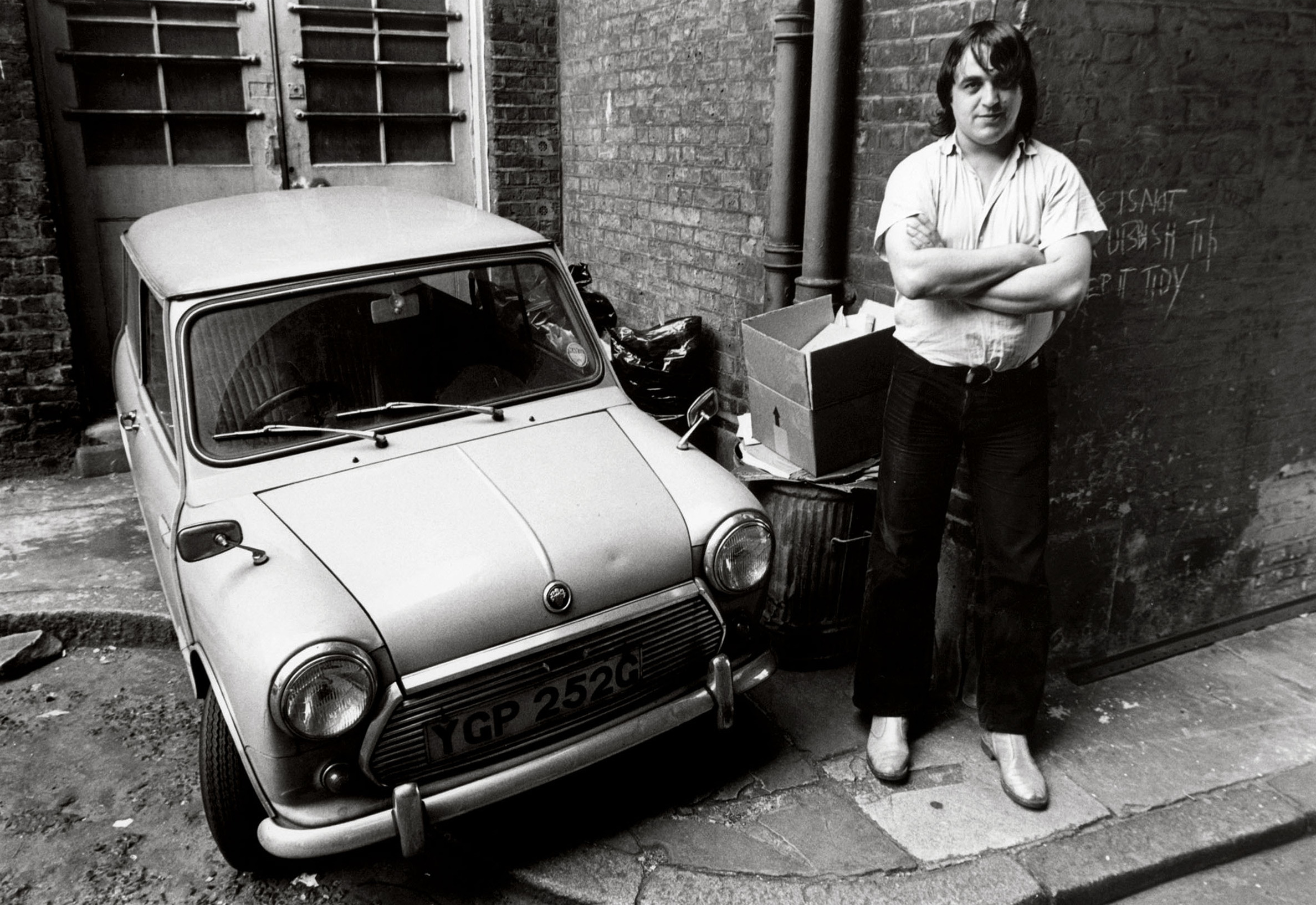
- Marc Didden (London, 1977)
- Born: 28 July 1949 (age 77); Hamont, Belgium
- Occupation: Film director

Marc Didden (born 28 July 1949) is a Belgian film director. He and his family moved to Brussels when he was age 2. He grew up in Brussels and studied Film Direction and Playwriting there.

Didden was rock journalist and critic for the Flemish magazine HUMO for many years, before he started directing movies in the 1980s.

== Filmography ==
As director

- Brussels By Night (1983)
- Istanbul (1985)
- Sailors don't cry (1988)
- Mannen maken plannen (1993)
- Cheb (short film)

As actor

- The Sacrament (1989) - Gigi

== TV ==
- Tip Toe Thru The Tulips (1994), with Hugo Claus
- 't Bolleken (1988)

== Bibliography ==
- May I Quest You an Askion (2000)
- Enkele Interviews (1980)
