= Boris Lehman =

Belgian author-filmmaker

Boris Lehman (born 3 March 1944, Lausanne), is a Belgian author-filmmaker of experimental cinema.

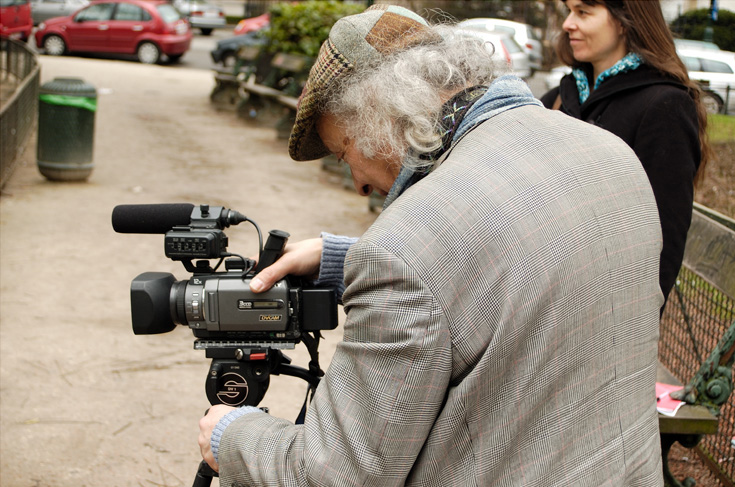
Boris Lehman

Lehman initially studied piano, but in the early 1960s became interested in photography and cinema. In 1966, after graduating in Film Studies from the Institut National Supérieur des Arts du spectacle, Brussels, he became a film enthusiast and critic, contributing reviews to weekly publications and magazines. He began making films between 1965 and 1983 when working for Club Antonin Artaud, a readjustment day centre for the mentally ill, using cinema as a therapeutic tool with patients. He later founded the film-based organisations Cinélibre, Cinédit, and AJC, the young filmmakers' workshop.

He has assisted Henri Storck with the films Secret Forest of Africa and Fêtes de Belgique, and Chantal Akerman with Jeanne Dielman. He has also collaborated with filmmakers Patrick Van Antwerpen, Jean-Marie Buchet and Gérard Courant. As an actor, Lehman has played roles in Brussels-transit (dir. Samy Szlingerbaum 1980), Canal K (dir. Maurice Rabinowicz 1970), and Les Filles en Orange (dir. Yaël André 2003).

Initially working with amateurs, he has produced 400 films in Super 8, 16 mm or video, as either shorts, features, documentaries, journals or autobiographies, and has shot 300,000 photographs. He wrote the libretto of Fanny Tran's opera ″ La véritable histoire de la Dame Blanche"(2020). Lehman's cinematic work has little public recognition but has been shown at numerous festivals and cine clubs.

== Films ==
- La Clé du champ, 1963
- Histoire d'un déménagement, 1967
- Catalogue, 1968
- Le Centre et la Classe, 1970
- Ne pas Stagner, 1973
- Knokke Out, 1974
- Album 1, 1974
- Magnum Begynasium Bruxellense, 1978
- Symphonie, 1979
- Couple, Regards, Positions, 1983
- Portrait du peintre dans son atelier, 1985
- Muet comme une carpe, 1987
- Masque, 1987
- L'Homme de Terre, 1989
- Cinématon (juif) de Gérard Courant, 1989
- A la recherche du lieu de ma naissance, 1990
- La Chute des Heures, 1990
- Babel / Lettre à mes amis restés en Belgique, 1991
- Tentatives de se décrire, 1989-2005
- Je suis fier d'être Belge, 1993
- Leçon de vie, 1994
- Homme portant son film le plus lourd, 1994
- La Division de mon temps, 1994
- Un jour comme les autres, 1994
- Check-Up (Etat de Santé), 1994
- Un Bruit qui rend sourd, 1995
- La Dernière s(cène), 1995
- Mes Entretiens filmés, 1996
- Mon voyage en Allemagne, 1997
- Mon voyage à Moscou, 1997
- L‘image et le monde, 1998
- A comme Adrienne, 2000
- Histoire de ma vie racontée par mes photographies, 2001
- Mes 7 lieux, 2001
- Homme portant, 2003
