= Dominique Deruddere =

Belgian film director

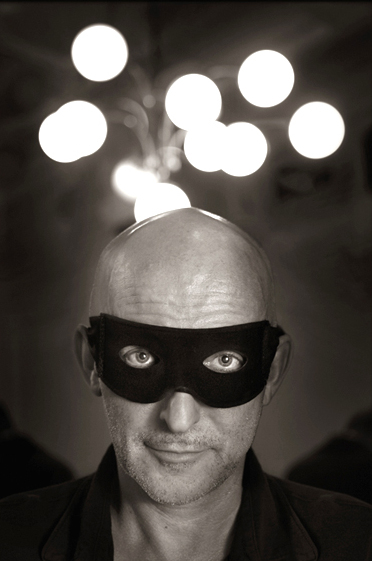
- Born: 15 June 1957 (age 69); Turnhout, Belgium

Dominique Deruddere (born 15 June 1957) is a Belgian film director, actor, screenwriter and producer.

== Career ==
Dominique Deruddere was an actor before he became a director.

== Filmography ==
- Crazy Love (1987)
- Wait Until Spring, Bandini (1989)
- Suite 16 (1994)
- Hombres Complicados (nl) (1997)
- Everybody's Famous! (2000)
- Pour le Plaisir (fr) (2004)
- The Wedding Party (de) (2005)
- Firmin (nl) (2007)
- Flying Home (2014)
- Will Tura, Hoop Doet Leven (2018)
- The Chapel (fr) (2023)

== Honours and awards ==
- San Sebastián International Film Festival – Best Director: 1987 (Crazy Love)
- Joseph Plateau Award – Best Director: 1987 (Crazy Love), 1990 (Wait Until Spring, Bandini)
- André Cavens Award – Best Film: 1989 (Wait Until Spring, Bandini)
- Joseph Plateau Award – Super Channel Award: 1990
- AFI Fest – Grand Jury Prize nomination: 1997 (Hombres Complicados)
- Emden International Film Festival – Film Award nomination: 1998 (Hombres Complicados)
- Venice Film Festival – Lion of the Year nomination: 2000 (Everybody's Famous!)
- Festroia International Film Festival – Best Screenplay: 2001 (Everybody's Famous!)
- Rouen Nordic Film Festival – Audience Award: 2001 (Everybody's Famous!)
- Ljubljana International Film Festival – Audience Award: 2001 (Everybody's Famous!)
- Valladolid International Film Festival – Golden Spike nomination: 2005 (Die Bluthochzeit)
- Ostend Film Festival – Audience Award nomination: 2019 (Will Tura, Hoop Doet Leven)
- Docville – Audience Award nomination: 2019 (Will Tura, Hoop Doet Leven)
- Shanghai International Film Festival – Golden Goblet nomination: 2023 (The Chapel)
