= 1942 in animation =

Events in 1942 in animation.

== Events ==
=== January ===
- January 11:
  - The Walt Disney Animation Studios releases the wartime propaganda cartoon Donald's Decision starring Donald Duck, directed by Ford Beebe Jr.
- January 16: Dick Lundy's Donald Duck cartoon The Village Smithy premieres, produced by Walt Disney Animation Studios.
- January 17: William Hanna & Joseph Barbera's Tom and Jerry cartoon Fraidy Cat premieres, produced by MGM's Cartoon Studio. Also starring Mammy Two Shoes.
- January 23: The Walt Disney Animation Studios releases the wartime propaganda cartoon The New Spirit starring Donald Duck promoting paying income taxes, directed by Wilfred Jackson and Ben Sharpsteen.
- January 26: George Pal's wartime propaganda cartoon Tulips Shall Grow premieres.
- January 31: Bob Clampett's (initially planned by Tex Avery) Aloha Hooey premieres, produced by Leon Schlesinger Productions.

=== February ===
- February 7: Riley Thomson's Mickey Mouse cartoon Mickey's Birthday Party premieres, produced by Walt Disney Animation Studios.
- February 26: 14th Academy Awards:
  - The Pluto cartoon Lend a Paw, produced by Walt Disney Animation Studios, wins the Academy Award for Best Animated Short Film.
  - The soundtrack of Dumbo, by Frank Churchill and Oliver Wallace, wins the Academy Award for Best Original Score.
  - Walt Disney, William Garity, John N.A. Hawkins, the RCA Manufacturing Company and Leopold Stokowski all win an Academy Honorary Award for Fantasia.
  - Walt Disney wins the Irving G. Thalberg Memorial Award.
- February 28: Chuck Jones' short Conrad the Sailor premieres, produced by Leon Schlesinger Productions. Also starring Daffy Duck. The cartoon is notable for its use of match cuts.

=== March ===
- March 14: Bob Clampett's (initially planned by Tex Avery) Crazy Cruise premieres, produced by Leon Schlesinger Productions.
- March 20: Riley Thomson's Mickey Mouse cartoon Symphony Hour, produced by Walt Disney Animation Studios, premieres.
- March 28: Friz Freleng's Bugs Bunny and Elmer Fudd cartoon The Wabbit Who Came to Supper, produced by Leon Schlesinger Productions, premieres. Second cartoon to feature Fat Elmer.
- Walt Disney Animation Studios releases Stop That Tank!, a wartime propaganda short directed by Ub Iwerks.

=== April ===
- April 2: Bob Clampett's war time propaganda cartoon Any Bonds Today?, produced by Leon Schlesinger Productions, starring Bugs Bunny, Porky Pig, and Elmer Fudd (fat version), is released to promote war bonds.
- April 6: In Nazi Germany Hans Fischerkoesen's Verwitterte Melodie premieres.
- April 10: Jack King's Donald Duck cartoon Donald's Snow Fight premieres, produced by Walt Disney Animation Studios. Also starring Huey, Dewey, and Louie.
- April 11: Bob Clampett's Horton Hatches the Egg premieres, produced by Leon Schlesinger Productions, based on Dr. Seuss' eponymous short story.
- April 18: William Hanna and Joseph Barbera's Tom and Jerry cartoon Dog Trouble premieres, produced by MGM's Cartoon Studio. Spike the bulldog makes his debut in this short. Also starring Mammy Two Shoes.

=== May ===
- May 1: Jack King's Donald Duck cartoon Donald Gets Drafted premieres, produced by Walt Disney Animation Studios. Also starring Pete.
- May 2:
  - Bob Clampett's Bugs Bunny & Elmer Fudd cartoon The Wacky Wabbit premieres, produced by Leon Schlesinger Productions. Third cartoon to feature Fat Elmer.
  - Norman McCabe's Daffy Duck cartoon Daffy's Southern Exposure, produced by Leon Schlesinger Productions, premieres.
- May 9: Chuck Jones' short, The Draft Horse premieres, produced by Leon Schlesinger Productions.
- May 27: Fleischer Studios goes bankrupt and closes down, with their animation department being taken over by Paramount's Famous Studios.
- May 30: William Hanna and Joseph Barbera's Tom and Jerry cartoon Puss n' Toots premieres, produced by MGM's Cartoon Studio. Also starring Mammy Two Shoes and Toots (in which the latter makes her debut).

=== June ===
- June 6: Chuck Jones' Bugs Bunny short Hold the Lion, Please, produced by Leon Schlesinger Productions, premieres.
- June 12: Jack King's Donald Duck cartoon Donald's Garden premieres, produced by Walt Disney Animation Studios.
- June 22: Walter Lantz' Woody Woodpecker cartoon Ace in the Hole premieres.

=== July ===
- July 3: William Hanna and Joseph Barbera's Tom and Jerry cartoon The Bowling Alley Cat premieres, produced by MGM's Cartoon Studio.
- July 11: Bob Clampett's Bugs Bunny cartoon Bugs Bunny Gets the Boid premieres, produced by Leon Schlesinger Productions in which Beaky Buzzard makes his debut.
- July 21: The Walt Disney Animation Studios releases the wartime propaganda cartoon Food Will Win the War, directed by Hamilton Luske.
- July 24: Jack King's Donald Duck cartoon Donald's Gold Mine premieres, produced by Walt Disney Animation Studios.
- July 30: The Walt Disney Animation Studios releases the wartime propaganda cartoon Out of the Frying Pan and into the Firing Line, directed by Ben Sharpsteen, starring Minnie Mouse and Pluto.

=== August ===
- August 1: Norman McCabe's wartime propaganda cartoon The Ducktators premieres, produced by Leon Schlesinger Productions. The cartoon satirizes Adolf Hitler, Benito Mussolini and Hideki Tojo.
- August 8: Chuck Jones's The Squawkin' Hawk premieres, produced by Leon Schlesinger Productions which marks the debut of Henery Hawk.
- August 9: The Walt Disney Animation Studios releases Bambi.
- August 22:
  - Friz Freleng's Bugs Bunny cartoon Fresh Hare, produced by Leon Schlesinger Productions, premieres. This short marks the final appearance of Fat Elmer Fudd, as he would begin to appear again in his normal physique.
  - Tex Avery's Blitz Wolf, his first cartoon directed & produced at MGM's Cartoon Studio, premieres. It's a war time propaganda short in which the Three Little Pigs story is retold with Adolf Hitler as the Big Bad Wolf.
- August 24: Walt Disney's Saludos Amigos premieres, an animated feature starring Donald Duck, aimed at the Latin American market, which will receive its U.S. premier half a year later. It marks the debut of José Carioca who will become a popular comics character in Brazil.
- August 29: Tex Avery's The Early Bird Dood It!, produced by MGM's Cartoon Studio, premieres.

=== September ===
- September 4: Jack Kinney's Goofy cartoon How to Play Baseball, produced by Walt Disney Animation Studios, premieres.
- September 5: Norman McCabe's Daffy Duck cartoon The Impatient Patient premieres, produced by Leon Schlesinger Productions.
- September 6: The wartime propaganda cartoon You're a Sap, Mr. Jap starring Popeye, directed by Dan Gordon, produced by Famous Studios, premieres.
- September 18: The wartime propaganda cartoon Japoteurs starring Superman, directed by Seymour Kneitel, produced by Famous Studios, premieres.
- September 19: Chuck Jones' short, The Dover Boys premieres, produced by Leon Schlesinger Productions. The short is notable for the use of limited animation and drybrush smear techniques.
- September 25: Jack King's Donald Duck cartoon The Vanishing Private, produced by Walt Disney Animation Studios, premieres. Also starring Pete.

=== October ===
- October 3: Bob Clampett's The Hep Cat, produced by Leon Schlesinger Productions, premieres.
- October 9: Jack Kinney's Goofy cartoon The Olympic Champ, produced by Walt Disney Animation Studios, premieres.
- October 10: William Hanna and Joseph Barbera's Tom and Jerry short Fine Feathered Friend, produced by MGM's Cartoon Studio, is released, It marks the debut of the iconic Tom and Jerry theme song.
- October 23: Jack Kinney's Goofy cartoon How to Swim, produced by Walt Disney Animation Studios, premieres.
- October 24: Norman McCabe's Daffy Duck cartoon The Daffy Duckaroo, produced by Leon Schlesinger Productions, premieres.
- October 31: Friz Freleng's Bugs Bunny & Elmer Fudd cartoon The Hare-Brained Hypnotist, produced by Leon Schlesinger Productions, premieres.

=== November ===
- November 6: Jack King's Donald Duck cartoon Sky Trooper premieres, produced by Walt Disney Animation Studios. Also starring Pete.
- November 20:
  - The wartime propaganda cartoon Eleventh Hour starring Superman, directed by Dan Gordon, produced by Famous Studios, premieres.
  - The wartime propaganda cartoon Scrap the Japs starring Popeye, directed by Seymour Kneitel, produced by Famous Studios, premieres.
  - Dante Quinterno's Upa en apuros premieres which is the first Argentine/ South American animated feature in colour.
- November 21: Bob Clampett's A Tale of Two Kitties premieres, produced by Leon Schlesinger Productions which marks the debut of Tweety Bird.

=== December ===
- December 5: Chuck Jones's Daffy Duck and Porky Pig cartoon My Favorite Duck, produced by Leon Schlesinger Productions, premieres.
- December 9: Jack Kinney's Goofy cartoon How to Fish, produced by Walt Disney Animation Studios, premieres.
- December 12: Chuck Jones' Bugs Bunny short Case of the Missing Hare premieres, produced by Leon Schlesinger Productions.
- December 18: Jack King's Donald Duck cartoon Bellboy Donald premieres, produced by Walt Disney Animation Studios. Also starring Pete.
- December 25: The Popeye cartoon Me Musical Nephews starring Popeye premieres, directed by Seymour Kneitel and produced by Famous Studios.

=== Specific date unknown ===
- Roberto Sgrilli creates the animated short Anacleto e la Faina.
- Norman McLaren's Hen Hop is released.

== Films released ==
- August 9 - Bambi (United States)
- August 24 - Saludos Amigos (United States)
- December 24 - 15.000 Dibujos (Chile)

== Births ==
=== January ===
- January 8: Stephen Hawking, English theoretical physicist, cosmologist and author (voiced himself in The Simpsons episodes "They Saved Lisa's Brain", "Don't Fear the Roofer", "Stop, Or My Dog Will Shoot!" and "Elementary School Musical", and the Futurama episodes "Anthology of Interest I", "The Beast with a Billion Backs" and "Reincarnation"), (d. 2018).
- January 11: Clarence Clemons, American musician and actor (voice of the Narrator in The Simpsons episode "Grift of the Magi"), (d. 2011).
- January 14: Michael Mills, British-born Canadian producer and director (Evolution, The Happy Prince, History of the World in Three Minutes Flat).
- January 17: Muhammad Ali, American boxer (voiced himself in I Am the Greatest: The Adventures of Muhammad Ali), (d. 2016).
- January 27: John Witherspoon, American actor and comedian (voice of Dad in Waynehead, Oran Jones in The Proud Family, Robert Freeman in The Boondocks, S. Ward Smith in Randy Cunningham: 9th Grade Ninja, Scofflaw in the Happily Ever After: Fairy Tales for Every Child episode "The Prince and the Pauper", Wayne in the Kim Possible episode "Rewriting History", Jimmy in the Animals episode "Squirrels", Franco Aplenty in the BoJack Horseman episode "Surprise"), (d. 2019).

=== February ===
- February 1: Terry Jones, Welsh-British actor, comedian, writer and film director (occasional voices in Terry Gilliam's animated shorts in Monty Python's Flying Circus and its film spin-offs, co-creator of Blazing Dragons), (d. 2020).
- February 2: Ed Bogas, American musician and composer (Fritz the Cat, Heavy Traffic, Peanuts, Garfield and Friends).
- February 13: Simon Prebble, English-American actor (voice of the Computer, Professor Frith and Jennings in Courage the Cowardly Dog, additional voices in Kenny the Shark).
- February 20: Tibor Kristóf, Hungarian actor (dub voice of Grigori Rasputin in Anastasia, Cookie in Atlantis: The Lost Empire, Doc Hudson in Cars, Zeus in Hercules, Señor Senior Sr. in Kim Possible, Scar in The Lion King, Henry J. Waternoose in Monsters, Inc., Lex Luthor in Superman: The Animated Series, Shredder in Teenage Mutant Ninja Turtles, Slinky Dog in the Toy Story franchise), (d. 2009).

=== March ===
- March 7: Michael Eisner, American businessman (The Walt Disney Company, founder of The Tornante Company, co-creator of Glenn Martin, DDS).
- March 15: The Iron Sheik, Iranian-American professional wrestler (voiced himself in the Robot Chicken episode "El Skeletorito"), (d. 2023).
- March 17: Roze Stiebra, Latvian animator (The Cat's Mill), (d. 2024).
- March 25: Richard O'Brien, British-New Zealand actor, writer, musician, and television presenter (voice of Lawrence Fletcher in Phineas and Ferb).
- March 27:
  - Art Evans, American actor (voice of Charlie in The Proud Family: Louder and Prouder episode "Old Towne Road"), (d. 2024).
  - Michael York, English actor (voice of Nuvo Vindi in Star Wars: The Clone Wars, Patrick in Ben 10: Alien Force and Ben 10: Ultimate Alien, Xan in Super Robot Monkey Team Hyperforce Go!, Pterano in The Land Before Time VII: The Stone of Cold Fire, Ares in the Justice League Unlimited episode "Hawk and Dove", Count Vertigo in the Batman: The Animated Series episode "Off Balance").

=== April ===
- April 14:
  - Stuart Craig, English production designer (The Cat Returns), (d. 2025).
  - Robert Dalva. American editor (Star Wars: The Clone Wars), (d. 2023).
- April 15: Frances Doel, British screenwriter (Aladdin and the Adventure of All Time), (d. 2025).
- April 17: David Bradley, English actor (voice of Merlin in the Tales of Arcadia franchise, Fowler in Chicken Run: Dawn of the Nugget, Geppetto in Guillermo del Toro's Pinocchio).
- April 20: Ishu Patel, Indian animation film director, producer, and educator.
- April 30: Bill Dennis, American animation executive (founder of Toonz Media Group), (d. 2023).

=== May ===
- May 11: Terry McGovern, American actor and radio personality (voice of Launchpad McQuack in DuckTales and Darkwing Duck).
- May 17: Taj Mahal, American musician and actor (voice of Ellis Robinson in the Aaahh!!! Real Monsters episode "Monster Blues", himself in the Arthur episode "Big Horns George", performed the theme song for Peep and the Big Wide World).
- May 19: Flemming Quist Møller, Danish director (Benny's Bathtub, Jungledyret Hugo), animator, author, drummer, screenwriter and actor (voice of the Feather King in Beyond Beyond), (d. 2022).

=== June ===
- June 2: Thomas Danneberg, German actor (German dub voice of Weaver in Antz, King Harold in the Shrek franchise), (d. 2023).
- June 15: Ian Greenberg, Canadian businessman and media pioneer (co-founder of Astral Media, former owner of Family Channel), (d. 2022).
- June 18: Paul McCartney, English singer and songwriter (voice of Rupert Bear in Rupert and the Frog Song, himself in The Simpsons episode "Lisa the Vegetarian").
- June 20: Brian Wilson, American musician (voiced himself in the Duck Dodgers episode "Surf the Stars"), (d. 2025).
- June 19: Jeff Moss, American composer (Sesame Street), (d. 1998).
- June 24: Michele Lee, American actress (voice of Cousin Mel in Grandma Got Run Over by a Reindeer, Estelle Lewis in the Family Guy episode "Extra Large Medium").

=== July ===
- July 2: Picha, Belgian cartoonist, comics artist, animator and film director (Tarzoon: Shame of the Jungle, The Missing Link, The Big Bang, Snow White: The Sequel).
- July 5: Ellen Fitzhugh, American lyricist (The Great Mouse Detective), (d. 2023).
- July 13: Harrison Ford, American actor (voice of Han Solo in The Star Wars Holiday Special, Rooster in The Secret Life of Pets 2).
- July 24: Chris Sarandon, American actor (voice of Jack Skellington in The Nightmare Before Christmas, Kurotowa in Nausicaä of the Valley of the Wind, Count Dracula in Teenage Mutant Ninja Turtles, Zebulon Kirk in The Chosen One, Myka in The Wild Thornberrys episode "Look Who's Squawking", Matt in the Danny Phantom episode "Pirate Radio").
- July 27: Susan Silo, American actress (voice of Sue in Pac-Man, Netti Pisghetti in Curious George, Neptunia in Darkwing Duck, Wuya in Xiaolin Showdown, Mama Mousekewitz in Fievel's American Tails, Auntie Roon in The Life and Times of Juniper Lee, Lin in The Legend of Korra, The White Queen in Pryde of the X-Men, Sartana the Dead in El Tigre: The Adventures of Manny Rivera, Mrs. Escrow in Foofur, She-Lion in Kidd Video).
- July 29: Tony Sirico, American actor (portrayed himself in the Family Guy episode "Stewie, Chris, & Brian's Excellent Adventure", voice of Vinny in Family Guy, Enzo Perotti in American Dad!, Big Daddy in The Fairly OddParents episodes "Talkin' Trash" and "Big Wanda"), (d. 2022).

=== August ===
- August 7: Tobin Bell, American actor (voice of Zaragoza in The Road to El Dorado).
- August 20: Isaac Hayes, American singer and actor (voice of Chef in South Park), (d. 2008).

=== September ===
- September 5: Werner Herzog, German filmmaker and actor (voice of Ishnifus Meaddle in Metalocalypse, Castorp in The Wind Rises, Shrimply Pibbles in the Rick and Morty episode "Interdimensional Cable 2: Tempting Fate", himself in The Simpsons episode "Mother and Child Reunion", the American Dad! episode "Ricky Spanish", and The Boondocks episode "It's a Black President, Huey Freeman").
- September 6: Robert Swarthe, American animator and special effects artist (Kick Me).
- September 11: Dan Hennessey, Canadian voice actor (voice of Brave Heart Lion in the Care Bears franchise, RoboCop in RoboCop, Chief Quimby in Inspector Gadget, Bully Koopa in The Adventures of Super Mario Bros. 3 and Super Mario World, Bolivar Trask, Abraham Cornelius, Sunder, Ruckus and Chrome in X-Men: The Animated Series, Beaster and Nasty Nigel in My Pet Monster, Turbo Tu-Tone, Bullit, and Boll Weevil in COPS, provided additional voices for Wild C.A.T.s), (d. 2024).
- September 17: Lupe Ontiveros, American actress (voice of Abuela Elena in Maya & Miguel, Lupe in the Family Guy episode "We Love You Conrad", Anne in the King of the Hill episode "The Substitute Spanish Prisoner"), (d. 2012).
- September 19: Victor Brandt, American actor (voice of Emil Hamilton in Superman: The Animated Series, General Crozier in Metalocalypse, Master Pakku in Avatar: The Last Airbender, Vladimir Kozyrev in the Totally Spies! episode "Child's Play", Rupert Thorne in The Batman episode "The Bat in the Belfry").
- September 23: Paila Pavese, Italian actress (Italian dub voice of Jessica Rabbit in Who Framed Roger Rabbit, Winnie in Planes: Fire and Rescue, Miss Montague in Gnomeo & Juliet, Suga Mama in The Proud Family, Molly Grue in The Last Unicorn), (d. 2024).
- September 29:
  - Madeleine Kahn, American actress, comedian, and singer (voice of Draggle in My Little Pony: The Movie, Gussie Mausheimer in An American Tail, Gypsy in A Bug's Life, Mrs. Shapiro in the Little Bill episode "The Campout"), (d. 1999).
  - Ian McShane, English actor (voice of Captain Hook in Shrek the Third, Tai Lung in the Kung Fu Panda franchise, Saiwa in My Father's Dragon, Artemis in The Simpsons episode "The Last Barfighter", Gordon in the SpongeBob SquarePants episode "Dear Vikings").

=== October ===
- October 2: Peter Newman, American voice actor (voice of Tygra and Wilykit in ThunderCats, Peter Knook, Awgwas, and the Gnome King in The Life and Adventures of Santa Claus, Mumbo Jumbo and Quicksilver in Silverhawks, Nikolai Jakov in Archer).
- October 3:
  - Steve Susskind, American actor (voice of J.J. Eureka Vatos in The Tick, Irate Chef in The Emperor's New Groove, Jerry Slugworth in Monsters, Inc., Sergeant Squash in the DuckTales episode "Duckworth's Revolt", Maxie Zeus in the Batman: The Animated Series episode "Fire from Olympus"), (d. 2005).
  - Alan Rachins, American actor (voice of Norman Osborn in The Spectacular Spider-Man, Clock King in the DC Animated Universe, Ned Staples in Scooby-Doo! Mecha Mutt Menace), (d. 2024).
- October 6: Fred Travalena, American entertainer (voice of Bogey Orangutan in Shirt Tales, Julius Caesar in Histeria!, King Ethelred in Dragon's Lair, William Dalton in Lucky Luke, Fic/Gokin in Gallavants), (d. 2009).
- October 18: Eli Noyes, American animator (Clay, Or the Origin of Species, Sesame Street, Liquid Television, IDs for Nickelodeon), (d. 2024).
- October 20: Robert Costanzo, American actor (voice of Harvey Bullock in the DC Animated Universe, Philoctetes in Hercules and House of Mouse, Maximillius Moose in Foodfight!).
- October 26: Bob Hoskins, English actor (portrayed Eddie Valiant in Who Framed Roger Rabbit, voice of Boris in Balto), (d. 2014).
- October 31: David Ogden Stiers, American actor (voice of Cogsworth in the Beauty and the Beast franchise and House of Mouse, Ratcliffe and Wiggins in Pocahontas, Archdeacon in The Hunchback of Notre Dame, Jumba Jookiba in the Lilo & Stitch franchise, Solovar in the DC Animated Universe, Dr. Odium in the Static Shock episode "Hoop Squad"), (d. 2018).

=== November ===
- November 1: Marcia Wallace, American actress and comedian (voice of Edna Krabappel and Ms. Melon in The Simpsons, Clovis, Mrs. Cavanaugh and Didi Lovelost in Darkwing Duck, 'Dark Interlude' Actress in the Batman: The Animated Series episode "Mudslide", Mrs. Blossom in The Addams Family episode "Sweetheart of a Brother", Mrs. Wheeler in the Captain Planet and the Planeteers episode "Talkin' Trash", Oopa in the Aladdin episode "The Game", Old Woman in the I Am Weasel episode "Driver's Sped", Mrs. Beaver in The Angry Beavers episode "If You In-Sisters", Mrs. Rapple in the Rugrats episode "Lil's Phil of Trash", additional voices in Camp Candy and Monsters University), (d. 2013).
- November 8: Tony Eastman, American animator (Sniz & Fondue, Saturday TV Funhouse, Between the Lions, Courage the Cowardly Dog, Harvey Birdman, Attorney at Law), storyboard artist (MTV Animation, Sheep in the Big City, I Spy, Codename: Kids Next Door) and director (Doug), (d. 2020).
- November 20: Bob Einstein, American actor, comedy writer and producer (voice of Super Dave Osborne in Super Dave: Daredevil for Hire, Elephant Trainer and The Bookie in The Life & Times of Tim, Stuff in Strange Magic), (d. 2019).
- November 24: Billy Connolly, Scottish actor and comedian (voice of Ben in Pocahontas, King Fergus in Brave, McSquizzy in Open Season and Open Season 2).
- November 25: Samir Chamas, Lebanese actor (Lebanese dub voice of Skipper in Planes and Planes: Fire and Rescue, Papa Smurf in The Smurfs), (d. 2024).
- November 27: Robert O. Smith, American voice actor (voice of Genma Saotome and Sasuke Sarugakure in Ranma ½, Kaijinbō in Inuyasha), (d. 2010).

=== December ===
- December 6: Nancy MacKenzie, Peruvian-Mexican voice actress (voice of Mother Nature in Katy Caterpillar, Latin American dub voice of Cruella de Vil in the 101 Dalmatians franchise, Marge Simpson in The Simpsons, Mrs. Keane in The Powerpuff Girls, Sailor Galaxia in the Sailor Moon franchise, Grandma Longneck in The Land Before Time IV: Journey Through the Mists, Cody's Mother in The Rescuers Down Under, the Mouse Queen in The Great Mouse Detective, Molly Grue in The Last Unicorn, Mrs. Fitzgibbons in The Secret of NIMH, Daphne Blake in The 13 Ghosts of Scooby-Doo, Ursula in George of the Jungle, Nanny in Muppet Babies, Daisy Duke in The Dukes), (d. 2024).
- December 16: Susan Shadburne, American screenwriter, director, producer, and filmmaker (Will Vinton Productions), (d. 2018).
- December 18: Harvey Atkin, Canadian actor (voice of Alien/Henchman in Heavy Metal, King Koopa in The Super Mario Bros. Super Show!), (d. 2017).
- December 23: Brian McConnachie, American actor and writer (The Simpsons episode "The Fabulous Faker Boy", Noddy, the HBO Storybook Musicals episode "Earthday Birthday"), (d. 2024).
- December 28: Benoît Allemane, French voice actor (French dub voice of Foghorn Leghorn in the Looney Tunes franchise, Ronan the Accuser in The Super Hero Squad Show, Mayor Hamilton Hill in Batman: The Animated Series, Silverback in Batman Unlimited: Animal Instincts, Doctor X in Action Man, Narrator in Teen Titans, voice of Akeltonon in Mummy Nanny, Santa Claus in Santa's Apprentice, Yule in Mune: Guardian of the Moon, Narrator in Snow White: The Sequel), (d. 2025).
- December 31: Dale Wilson, Canadian actor (voice of Ja-Kal in Mummies Alive!, Cell, Kami and Android 8 in the Ocean dub of Dragon Ball Z, Paw Pooch in Krypto the Superdog, Java in Martin Mystery, Akuma in Street Fighter, Robert Kelly in X-Men: Evolution and Iron Man: Armored Adventures, Clow Reed in the Nelvana dub of Cardcaptor Sakura, Captain Grid-Iron in G.I. Joe: A Real American Hero, Wreckage in G.I. Joe Extreme, Smokescreen and Hoist in Transformers: Armada, Mudflap in Transformers: Cybertron, Machine Man and Electro in Spider-Man Unlimited, Knuck in Action Man, Toa Lewa and Turaga Onewa in Bionicle: Mask of Light, provided additional voices for Extreme Dinosaurs), (d. 2025).

=== Specific date unknown ===
- Richard Condie, Canadian animator, filmmaker and musician (The Big Snit, The Cat Came Back).
- Aylin Özmenek, Turkish animator, (d. 2021).
- Fernando Ruiz Álvarez, Mexican animator (The Sword in the Stone) and director (Los Tres Reyes Magos, La Bruja Chiriloca, Los Telerines, The Adventures of Oliver Twist), (d. 2021).

== Deaths ==
=== March ===
- March 7: Tony Sarg, German-American puppeteer and illustrator (The First Circus, Tony Sarg's Almanac), dies at age 61.

=== May ===
- May 12: Raymond Ditmars, American herpetologist and documentary filmmaker on the topic of natural history, (pioneer in the use of stop-motion animation, timelapse, macro photography, and sound film in documentary films.) dies at age 65.
- May 14: Frank Churchill, American composer and songwriter (Walt Disney Animation Studios), dies at age 40.

=== November ===
- November 24: Jean de Paleologu, Romanian illustrator, painter, and poster artist, (created advertisements and publicity material for the American film industry and animation industry), dies at age 87.

== See also ==
- List of anime by release date (1939–1945)
