= Roy Budd =

British jazz pianist and composer (1947–1993)

Roy Frederick Budd (14 March 1947 – 7 August 1993) was an English jazz pianist and composer known for his film scores, including Get Carter and The Wild Geese.

== Early life ==
Born in South Norwood, South London, Budd became interested in music at an early age and began to play the piano when he was two, initially by ear and then by copying various melodies he heard by listening to the radio. When he was six, two Austrian music experts visited him at home and after various tests, found that he had perfect pitch. In 1953, he made his public concert debut at the London Coliseum. By the age of eight, he could play the Wurlitzer organ and four years later he was appearing on television at the London Palladium.

In 1950 and 1951 he featured on the Carroll Levis show on radio. Roy also won a talent competition on a television talent show hosted by Bert Weedon in 1952. He sang some Jerry Lee Lewis songs when he was eleven years old with his brother Peter and a friend at the Sutton Granada under the name The Blue Devils.

He formed the Roy Budd Trio with bassist Peter McGurk and his cousin, drummer Trevor Tomkins before leaving school and embarking on a career as a jazz pianist. Roy later reformed the trio with Tony Archer or Jeff Clyne on bass and Chris Karan on drums. Clyne was later replaced by Pete Morgan, creating a line-up that was maintained until his death.

Budd met composer Jack Fishman while working at the Bull's Head club in London. Fishman got him signed to Pye, which released his first recording, the single "Birth of the Budd" in 1965 and his album Pick Yourself Up!! This Is Roy Budd in 1967. The album featured Chris Karan was on drums, Peter McGurk on bass for the orchestral tracks and Dave Holland on bass on the four trio tracks. Tony Hatch and Johnny Harris arranged the orchestral tracks. In his sleeve notes, Hatch refers to seeing Budd on the David Frost show on television in February 1967 playing the Frank Loesser composition "I've Never Been in Love Before", which is on the album.

Around that same time, he also recorded an album named simply Roy Budd featuring Ian Carr on trumpet, Dick Morrissey on tenor sax, Trevor Tomkins on drums, playing arrangements by fellow pianist Harry South.

== Film career ==
In 1970, Budd made his film score début for director Ralph Nelson, who was looking for an English composer for his western Soldier Blue. Budd recorded a tape of his own interpretation of music by composers Jerry Goldsmith, John Williams, Max Steiner, Dimitri Tiomkin and Lalo Schifrin. Apart from the main theme, which he based on Buffy Sainte-Marie's hit song of the same title, he composed all the music required for the film and conducted the Royal Philharmonic Orchestra, which Nelson commissioned at the start of the film's production.

In 1971, still in his early twenties, he composed one of his best known scores, the music for the film Get Carter. The film's budget reputedly allowed only £450 for the score, but he overcame this restriction by using only three musicians, including himself playing electric piano and harpsichord simultaneously. In 1981 The Human League covered the film's theme on their album Dare. Also in 1971, Budd was asked by Nelson to compose the music to Flight of the Doves, and worked with Dana who sang the film's theme; and composed the scores for the adventure Kidnapped and the western Catlow.

In 1972 he recorded the score to Fear Is the Key, which was based on the Alistair MacLean novel. Whilst recording the score, Budd was influenced by Ronnie Scott, Tubby Hayes and Kenny Baker, thus giving the music a jazz-sounding theme. Scott played the saxophone for the car chase sequence. Budd, alongside Fishman, composed for the two Steptoe and Son films in 1972 and 1973.

Budd later worked for the producer Euan Lloyd on films, including Paper Tiger (1975), The Wild Geese (1978), The Sea Wolves (1980), Who Dares Wins (1982) and Wild Geese II (1985).

== Later career ==
Budd's film work in the eighties included the scores for Mama Dracula (1980), Field of Honor (1986), and Picha's adult cartoons The Missing Link (1980) and The Big Bang (1987). Returning to his first love, he played jazz shows at Duke's Bar in Marylebone, London, partnering with harmonica player, Larry Adler. He also arranged for and accompanied Bob Hope, Tony Bennett, and Charles Aznavour.

Budd recorded two albums of film music with the London Symphony Orchestra. The first contained "Star Wars Trilogy", "Superman", "E.T.", "Raiders of the Lost Ark", "Star Trek: The Full Suite", "Alien", "Dr. Who", "Sinbad and the Eye of the Tiger". This was recorded at the end of May and beginning of June 1984 at the CTS Studio in Wembley. In 1985, the London Symphony Orchestra made a recording of the music from The Wild Geese, again at CTS Studio. Budd's other solo albums include Live at Newport, Everything is Coming Up Roses, and Have a Jazzy Christmas.

Budd continued to compose into the late 1980s and early 1990s. His Tricolour Overture was written in 1988. The score was lost but has been reconstructed by Adam Langston and recorded. His last work was a symphonic score for the 1925 silent film The Phantom of the Opera, recorded by the RTL Symphony Orchestra in Luxembourg in 1993.

== Personal life ==
In 1972, as his career was peaking, Budd married the actress and singer Caterina Valente, but they divorced seven years later. He remarried in the 1980s to Sylvia and they remained together until his death.

Roy Budd died of a brain haemorrhage at the age of 46 on 7 August 1993.

== Filmography ==
- Soldier Blue (1970)
- Get Carter (1971)
- Flight of the Doves (1971)
- Zeppelin (1971)
- The Magnificent Seven Deadly Sins (1971)
- Catlow (1971)
- Kidnapped (1971)
- Something to Hide (1972)
- Steptoe and Son (1972)
- The Carey Treatment (1972)
- Fear Is the Key (1972)
- Man at the Top (1973)
- Steptoe and Son Ride Again (1973)
- The Stone Killer (1973)
- The Black Windmill (1974)
- The Internecine Project (1974)
- The Marseille Contract (1974)
- Diamonds (1975)
- Paper Tiger (1975)
- Welcome to Blood City (1977)
- Sinbad and the Eye of the Tiger (1977)
- Tomorrow Never Comes (1978)
- The Wild Geese (1978)
- The Sandbaggers (1978)
- The Missing Link (1980)
- The Sea Wolves (1980)
- Mama Dracula (1980)
- Who Dares Wins (1982)
- Wild Geese II (1985)
- Field of Honor (1986)
- The Big Bang (1987)
