= The Wedding Ring (1970 film) =

1970 film

- Directed by: Christian de Chalonge
- Written by: Jean-Claude Carrière; Christian de Chalonge
- Produced by: Paul Claudon
- Starring: Anna Karina
- Cinematography: Alain Derobe
- Edited by: Henri Lanoë
- Music by: Gilbert Amy
- Distributed by: Paramount Pictures (through Cinema International Corporation)
- Release date: 1970
- Running time: 90 minutes
- Country: France
- Language: French

The Wedding Ring (French: L'Alliance) is a 1970 French mystery film directed by Christian de Chalonge and starring Anna Karina. It was screened at the 31st Venice International Film Festival.

== Cast ==
- Anna Karina as Jeanne
- Jean-Claude Carrière as Hugues
- Isabelle Sadoyan as Hélène
- Tsilla Chelton as Madame Duvernet
- Paule Emanuele as Madame Sedaine
- André Gille as Monsieur Sedaine
- Rufus as The pigeons' breeder
- Jean Wiener
- Pierre Risch
- Pierre Julien
- Georges Poichet
- Pascal Korner
- Jean-Claude de Goros
- Antonio Pérez
