= Vincent Grass =

Belgian actor

- Born: 9 January 1949 (age 77); Brussels, Belgium
- Years active: 1973–present

Vincent Grass (born 9 January 1949) is a Belgian actor. He has appeared in a number of both European and American film and television productions, the first being the Belgian television production Siska Van Roosemaal in 1973. Grass played Fiancé in Boris Szulzinger's Mama Dracula (1980) and Doctor Cornelius in the 2008 film The Chronicles of Narnia: Prince Caspian.

== Theater ==
Year	Title	Author	Director	Notes
1998	Death of a Salesman	Arthur Miller	Régis Santon	Monfort-Théâtre
2001	Staline mélodie	David Pownall	Régis Santon (2)	Monfort-Théâtre
2010	Dernière Station avant le désert	Lanie Robertson	Georges Werler	Petit-Saint-Martin
2014	Dom Juan	Molière	Arnaud Denis	Théâtre 14 Jean-Marie Serreau

== Filmography ==
Year	Title	Role	Director	Notes
1973	Siska Van Roosemaal	François Deprez	Dré Poppe	TV movie
1976	Pallieter		Roland Verhavert	
1977	Le mille-pattes fait des claquettes		Jean Girault	
1977	Le loup blanc		Jean-Pierre Decourt	TV movie
1978	La filière	Cyrille	Guy Lefranc	TV mini-series
1978	Le temps des as	Sagoud	Claude Boissol	TV mini-series
1979	Lady Oscar	An insolent soldier	Jacques Demy	
1979	La triple muerte del tercer personaje		Helvio Soto	
1979	Commissaire Moulin	The gas station owner	Claude Boissol	TV series (1 episode)
1980	Mama Dracula	Fiancé	Boris Szulzinger	
1980	Les amours du mal-aimé	Albert	Marcel Camus	TV movie
1980	Légitime défense	Marc	Claude Grinberg	TV movie
1981	La provinciale		Claude Goretta	
1981	Anthelme Collet ou Le brigand gentillhomme		Jean-Paul Carrère	TV mini-series
1981	Cinéma 16		Liliane de Kermadec	TV series (1 episode)
1981	Commissaire Moulin	Inspector Gervoise	Jean Kerchbron	TV series (1 episode)
1982	Enigma	Soviet W	Jeannot Szwarc	
1982	Smiley's People	Bus Driver	Simon Langton	TV mini-series
1983	Traversées	The English cop	Mahmoud Ben Mahmoud	
1984	Le fou du roi	A Belgian	Yvan Chiffre	
1984	Soldat Richter		Jean Pignol	TV movie
1985	Code Name: Emerald	Tracker	Jonathan Sanger	
1985	Les colonnes du ciel	Jontains	Gabriel Axel	TV mini-series
1986	Crossings	Schmidt	Karen Arthur	TV mini-series
1987	Carnaval		Ronny Coutteure	
1987	Race for the Bomb	Hans Bethe	Jean-François Delassus & Allan Eastman	TV mini-series
1987	Série noire	A cop	Daniel Duval	TV series (1 episode)
1988	To Kill a Priest		Agnieszka Holland	
1988	King of the Olympics	Baillet-Latour	Lee Philips	TV movie
1989	Race for Glory	Alex Vogt	Rocky Lang	
1989	Champagne Charlie		Allan Eastman	TV movie
1989	Tribunal	Louis Algado	Jean-Pierre Prévost	TV series (1 episode)
1989	Le masque	Praslou	Marco Zerla	TV series (1 episode)
1989	The Hitchhiker	Police Officer	Bruno Gantillon & Robin Davis	TV series (3 episodes)
1990	Uranus	Ledieu	Claude Berri	
1990	L'Autrichienne	Roussillon	Pierre Granier-Deferre	
1990	The Radicals	Wolfgang Capito	Raul V. Carrera	
1990	Night of the Fox	Greiser	Charles Jarrott	TV movie
1990	The Saint: The Big Bang	Voss	Paolo Barzman	TV movie
1990	Counterstrike		Michael Schock	TV series (1 episode)
1991	Merci la vie		Bertrand Blier	
1991	L'année de l'éveil	The German professor	Gérard Corbiau	
1991	Memories of Midnight	Yves Renard	Gary Nelson	TV movie
1991	Largo desolato		Agnieszka Holland	TV movie
1992	Je pense à vous		Dardenne brothers	
1992	Warburg: A Man of Influence	Walter Rathenau	Moshé Mizrahi	TV mini-series
1992	The New Statesman	Claude Chagrin	Graeme Harper	TV series (1 episode)
1992	Maigret	The Marinier	Serge Leroy	TV series (1 episode)
1993	The Hour of the Pig	Bailiff Labatier	Leslie Megahey	
1993	Pétain	Mandel	Jean Marboeuf	
1994	Dead Tired	The swinger	Michel Blanc	
1994	Les amoureux	Mr. Godfroy	Catherine Corsini	
1994	Sharpe's Enemy	General Chaumier	Tom Clegg	TV movie
1994	Fall from Grace	Corporal	Waris Hussein	TV movie
1994	Un crime de guerre	Ecklinger	Michel Wyn	TV movie
1995	L'amour tagué	Berg	Bruno Carrière	TV movie
1995	Charlotte et Léa	Desmarets	Jean-Claude Sussfeld	TV movie
1995	Maigret	Francis	Pierre Joassin	TV series (1 episode)
1996	Les enfants du mensonge	Max	Frédéric Krivine	TV movie
1996	Le juge est une femme	Dragovic	Pierre Boutron	TV series (1 episode)
1996	Les mercredis de la vie	Raoul	Dominique Baron	TV series (1 episode)
1996	L'histoire du samedi		Philippe Bensoussan	TV series (1 episode)
1997	Ma vie en rose	Principal	Alain Berliner	
1997	Meurtre à l'étage	Richard	Bruno Gantillon	TV movie
1997	Julie Lescaut	Fred Pastor	Alain Wermus	TV series (1 episode)
1997	Maître Da Costa	Maximilien Todd	Bob Swaim	TV series (1 episode)
1997	Quai n° 1	Dewaele	André Buytaers	TV series (1 episode)
1998	La carte postale	The Undertaker	Vivian Goffette	Short
1998	Hornblower: The Even Chance	Captain Forget	Andrew Grieve	TV movie
1998	Interdit de vieillir	Maurice Fortier	Dominique Tabuteau	TV movie
1998	Pour mon fils	The doctor	Michaëla Watteaux	TV movie
1998	Louise et les marchés	Jandier	Marc Rivière	TV mini-series
1999	Le frère Irlandais	André Billard	Robin Davis	TV movie
1999	Josephine, Guardian Angel	The fat client	Pierre Joassin	TV series (1 episode)
2000	Vatel	Martin's Father	Roland Joffé	
2000	Le Roi danse	Archbishop of Paris	Gérard Corbiau	
2000	Le centre du monde	Jacques	Vivian Goffette	Short
2000	Une femme d'honneur	Maurice Quentin	David Delrieux	TV series (1 episode)
2001	Fourplay	Fiona's Father	Mike Binder	
2001	Change moi ma vie	Disabled client	Liria Bégéja	
2001	Je peux dire une connerie ?	Voice	Patrick Menais	
2001	La baie de l'archange	The mayor	David Delrieux	TV movie
2002	Un petit Parisien	The grand father	Sébastien Grall	TV movie
2002	Napoléon	Charles IV of Spain	Yves Simoneau	TV mini-series
2003	Saint-Germain ou La négociation	Chazal	Gérard Corbiau	TV movie
2003	Le Mystère des sources du Nil	Voice-over	Stéphane Bégoin	Documentary film
2004	The Tulse Luper Suitcases	Mrs. Moitessier's Father	Peter Greenaway	
2004	Big Kiss	Vandenhoot	Billy Zane	
2004	Un Jean-Pierre ça peut tout faire	Voice	Patrick Menais	
2005	Empire of the Wolves	Marius	Chris Nahon	
2005	Zim and Co.	The teacher	Pierre Jolivet	
2005	Palais royal!	M. Lamache	Valérie Lemercier	
2005	Skattejakten	Curator	Thomas Kaiser	TV series (1 episode)
2006	Asterix and the Vikings	Abraracourcix	Jesper Møller & Stefan Fjeldmark	
2006	Louis la brocante	Albert	Pierre Sisser	TV series (1 episode)
2006	David Nolande	Company cleaning boss	Nicolas Cuche	TV series (1 episode)
2007	La lance de la destinée	The priest	Dennis Berry	TV mini-series
2008	The Chronicles of Narnia: Prince Caspian	Doctor Cornelius	Andrew Adamson	
2008	The Sea Wall	Father Bart	Rithy Panh	
2008	The Chronicles of Narnia: Prince Caspian	Doctor Cornelius	Andrew Adamson	Video game
2009	Machination	The dentist	Arnaud Demanche	Short
2009	Wakfu	Tolot / Mounu	Anthony Roux, Fafah Togora, ...	TV series (4 episodes)
2011	Braquo	Breymaert	Philippe Haïm	TV series (1 episode)
2012	Ernest & Celestine	Chief Police of Bears	Stéphane Aubier, Vincent Patar, ...	
2012	Solus	Eddy	Robin Bersot, Camille Dellerie, ...	Short
2012	Deux flics sur les docks	Benoit Lebihan	Edwin Baily	TV series (1 episode)
2013	Marina	Chairman Ministry	Stijn Coninx	
2013	Santa's Apprentice	The Victorian Santa Claus	Luc Vinciguerra	
2013	Yam dam		Vivian Goffette	
2013	L'Incroyable Marrec	Old Marrec	Régis Aillet, Alexandre Bass, ...	Short
2013	Being Homer Simpson	Barman	Arnaud Demanche	Short
2013	Avis aux intéressés	Daniel	Cédric Romain	Short
2013	Pierrick	The father	Clément Abbey & Arthur Lecouturier	Short
2015	Les gorilles	Instructor SPHP	Tristan Aurouet	
2015	Le Hobbit: Le Retour du Roi du Cantal	Bofur	Léo Pons	
2015	Rubato	The Musician	Félix Ferrand, Florian Magnin, ...	Short
2016	Popsy	Monsieur Sorcier	Julien Homsy	Short
2016	Tutankhamun	Sir Gaston Maspero	Peter Webber	TV mini-series
2016	The Break	Lucien Rabet	Matthieu Donck	TV series (10 episodes)
2017	The Old Lady		Samuel Miralles	Short
2018	Au poste!	Daniel	Quentin Dupieux	
2018	The Marcus Garvey Story	Calvin Coolidge	Steven Anderson	
2018	At Eternity's Gate	Café Owner	Julian Schnabel	
2018	Joseph	Joseph Vasanellis	Jordan Anefalos	Short
2019	An Officer and a Spy	Jean-Baptiste Billot	Roman Polanski	
2025	Phantom Manor: The Bride's Song	TBA	Johan Souply	Short

== Dubbing ==
Year	Title	Role	Actors	Director	Notes
1981	Das Boot	Chief Engineer	Klaus Wennemann	Wolfgang Petersen	
1984	Amadeus	Giuseppe Bonno	Patrick Hines	Miloš Forman	
1987	Good Morning, Vietnam	Marty Lee Dreiwitz	Robert Wuhl	Barry Levinson	
1988	The Last Temptation of Christ	Andrew the Apostle	Gary Basaraba	Martin Scorsese	
1988	Cop	Delbert 'Whitey' Haines	Charles Haid	James B. Harris	
1989	Indiana Jones and the Last Crusade	Colonel Vogel	Michael Byrne	Steven Spielberg	
1989	Next of Kin	Willy Simpson	Ted Levine	John Irvin	
1992	My Cousin Vinny	Sheriff Dean Farley	Bruce McGill	Jonathan Lynn	
1993	Undercover Blues	Sykes	Marshall Bell	Herbert Ross	
1994	Clear and Present Danger	Enrique Rojas	Patrick Bauchau	Phillip Noyce	
1994	On Deadly Ground	Stone	R. Lee Ermey	Steven Seagal	
1996	Striptease	Malcolm Moldowsky	Paul Guilfoyle	Andrew Bergman	
1997	Air Force One	Lloyd Shepherd	Paul Guilfoyle (2)	Wolfgang Petersen	
1999	The Matrix	Agent Smith	Hugo Weaving	The Wachowskis	
1999	The Insider	Ron Motley	Bruce McGill (2)	Michael Mann	
2000	Harrison's Flowers	Samuel Brubeck	Alun Armstrong	Élie Chouraqui	
2001	The Lord of the Rings: The Fellowship of the Ring	Gimli	John Rhys-Davies	Peter Jackson	
2001	Meet John Doe	D.B. Norton	Edward Arnold	Frank Capra	
2002	Harry Potter and the Chamber of Secrets	Aragog	Julian Glover	Chris Columbus	
2002	The Lord of the Rings: The Two Towers	Gimli / Treebeard	John Rhys-Davies (2)	Peter Jackson	
2003	Willard	Frank Martin	R. Lee Ermey (2)	Glen Morgan	
2003	The Matrix Reloaded	Agent Smith	Hugo Weaving (2)	The Wachowskis	
2003	The Matrix Revolutions	Agent Smith	Hugo Weaving (3)	The Wachowskis	
2003	Matchstick Men	Chuck Frechette	Bruce McGill (3)	Ridley Scott	
2003	The Texas Chainsaw Massacre	Sheriff Hoyt	R. Lee Ermey (3)	Marcus Nispel	
2003	The Lord of the Rings: The Return of the King	Gimli / Treebeard	John Rhys-Davies (3)	Peter Jackson	
2003	Saraband	Henrik	Börje Ahlstedt	Ingmar Bergman	TV movie
2003	The Lord of the Rings: The Two Towers	Gimli	John Rhys-Davies (4)	Hudson Piehl	Video game
2004	Lemony Snicket's A Series of Unfortunate Events	Mr. Poe	Timothy Spall	Brad Silberling	
2005	Maigret	Jules Maigret	Bruno Cremer	Charles Nemes	TV series (1 episode)
2006	The Texas Chainsaw Massacre: The Beginning	Charlie Hewitt Jr. / Sheriff Hoyt	R. Lee Ermey (4)	Jonathan Liebesman	
2006	Behind Enemy Lines II: Axis of Evil	General Norman T. Vance	Bruce McGill (4)	James Dodson	
2008	Valkyrie	Wilhelm Keitel	Kenneth Cranham	Bryan Singer	
2008	Appaloosa	Phil Olson	Timothy Spall (2)	Ed Harris	
2008	Mirrors	Robert Esseker	Julian Glover (2)	Alexandre Aja	
2009	The Girl with the Dragon Tattoo	Nils Bjurman	Peter Andersson	Niels Arden Oplev	
2009	From Time to Time	Boggis	Timothy Spall (3)	Julian Fellowes	
2009	The Young Victoria	Duke of Wellington	Julian Glover (3)	Jean-Marc Vallée	
2009	Assassin's Creed II	Emilio Barbarigo	Arthur Holden	Patrice Désilets	Video game
2010	Made in Dagenham	Monty Taylor	Kenneth Cranham (2)	Nigel Cole	
2010	Alice in Wonderland	Bayard	Timothy Spall (4)	Tim Burton	
2011	Rango	Tortoise John	Ned Beatty	Gore Verbinski	
2011	Rampart	Hartshorn	Ned Beatty (2)	Oren Moverman	
2011	The Lord of the Rings: War in the North	Gimli	John Rhys-Davies (5)	Nathan Hendrickson	Video game
2011	Game of Thrones	Robert Baratheon	Mark Addy	Tim Van Patten, Brian Kirk & Daniel Minahan	TV series (7 Episode)
2012	Lincoln	Edwin Stanton	Bruce McGill (5)	Steven Spielberg	
2012	Lego The Lord of the Rings	Gimli	John Rhys-Davies (6)	James McLoughlin & Dan McCreadie	Video game
2012	Hatfields & McCoys	Jim Vance	Tom Berenger	Kevin Reynolds	TV mini-series
2013	The Love Punch	Jerry	Timothy Spall (5)	Joel Hopkins	
2014	Bad Country	Lutin Adams	Tom Berenger (2)	Chris Brinker	
2014	Maleficent	King Henry	Kenneth Cranham (3)	Robert Stromberg	
2014	Reach Me	Teddy Raymonds	Tom Berenger (3)	John Herzfeld	
2014	Watch Dogs	Mayor Donovan Rushmore	Michel Perron	Jonathan Morin & Kun Chang	Video game
2016	Alice Through the Looking Glass	Bayard	Timothy Spall (6)	James Bobin	
2016	Final Fantasy XV	Emperor Iedolas Aldercapt	Shōzō Iizuka	Hajime Tabata & Tetsuya Nomura	Video game
