= The Big Bang (1987 film) =

1987 film directed by Picha

- Film poster
- Directed by: Picha
- Written by: Picha; Guy Lionel (French version); Tony Hendra (English version)
- Produced by: Boris Szulzinger
- Starring: David Lander; Carole Androsky; Marshall Efron; Alice Playten
- Narrated by: Georges Aminel
- Music by: Roy Budd
- Production companies: Stout Studio; Comedia; Zwanz
- Distributed by: 20th Century Fox (France); Films 31 (Belgium)
- Release dates: 6 March 1987 (Denmark); 18 March 1987 (France)
- Running time: 76 minutes
- Countries: Belgium; France
- Languages: English (original); French (dubbed)

The Big Bang, also known as Le Big-Bang, is an adult animated science fiction comedy film, originally released in 1987 by 20th Century Fox in France and Entertainment Film Distributors, Ltd in the United Kingdom. The original English version was written by satirist Tony Hendra, who was also the voice director, while the French version was written by Guy Lionel and directed by Jean Droze.

== Plot ==
In 1995, World War III begins by accident when a hitman uses an miniature nuclear weapon in a hit which destroys Sicily; Italy mistakes the blast for nuclear terrorism and annihilates Libya, which destroys Israel. Africa bombs Germany, which in turn attacks France. Luxembourg bombs England. Sweden destroys itself. The Russians decide to liquidate the Americans, who in turn unleash their nuclear fleet, leaving only two continents on the verge of World War IV. In the north, America and Russia merge, containing a mutated strain of males, forming the USSSR. In the south, all that is left of womankind retreat to their territory of Vaginia. The armies of these two nations are soon at odds with each other as they perfect their most destructive weapons capable of destroying the universe.

The Council of the Universe, fearing for everyone's safety, appoints Fred Hero, a retired superhero now working as a garbageman to diplomatically calm the situation down. He is given a powerful light bulb that makes him invincible. Fred firsts starts off with the USSSR and tries to persuade the nation's leader, the Comrade-In-Chief, to get rid of all of the bombs. The Comrade-In-Chief sees Fred as a lunatic and whispers to his three minions to fetch the guards. While he is waiting, The Comrade-In-Chief explains to Fred that all of the men lost their asses during World War III. The women were safe underground. When the war was over, and the women came back up and saw the men without their asses, they just laughed. The Comrade-In-Chief plans to destroy Vaginia with their weapon "The Big One" - a missile shaped like a penis. After the history lesson, Fred accidentally meets and promptly falls in love with the nation's female mascot, Liberty. Fred escapes the Comrade's lair with Liberty. When they are finally alone, Fred wishes to marry Liberty, but Liberty finds out that Fred is married. Liberty is shocked and decides to return to the Comrade.

Fred then flies over to Vagina and meets the multi-breasted leader Una. Una reveals the Vaginia has a super-weapon called "Big Mama" - a spherical missile that has a vagina and nipple on it that is designed to combine with "The Big One" and thus destroy the universe. Fred once again tries to get Una to make peace with the USSSR, but this time, Una agrees, but only if he and her have sex. Fred is unable to withstand her advances, and unable to please her complex body. With no hope for peace and mad with rage at the idea of being separated from Liberty, Fred inadvertently starts the Fourth World War. While the two nations fight, Fred eventually decides to try to win Liberty's heart back and save the universe. Liberty is taken on board "The Big One", which starts to rise as Fred hurries to her rescue. He manages to get on board and escape with her to the safety of a tropical island only for them to be caught up in the final battle between both nations armies. As the two missiles circle above the sky, this gets the two nations extremely horny for each other. While the two nations have an orgy on the island, Fred tries to get back with Liberty, who still declines Fred's offer, due to Fred still being married. Just then, Fred gets a message from his wife, who says that she is seeing another man, Conan, Fred's Conan the Barbarian-like coworker. Fred and Liberty run toward each other with open arms. As they hug, "The Big One" penetrates "Big Mama" and both explode in a cosmic orgasm which causes the entire universe to be destroyed. God, who is having sex with his wife notices this but does not care. Fred and Liberty arrive in Heaven, and they both have sex in a lone cloud, beginning their new life together.

== Voice cast ==
Character	Original	*French
Fred Hero	David Lander	Luis Rego
The Comrade in Chief	Marshall Efron	Georges Aminel
First, Secretary General of the Universe	Marvin Silbersher	Georges Aminel
Narrator	Marvin Silbersher	Georges Aminel
Una	Alice Playten	Perrette Pradier
Liberty	Carole Androsky	Régine Teyssot
Trixie	Joanna Rush	Paule Emanuele
Darth Vader	Ray Owens	Henry Djanik

*Recorded after the English version

=== Additional Voices ===
- Original: Jerry Bledsoe (radio announcer), Josh Daniel, Bob Kaliban, George Osterman, Robert Towers, Deborah Taylor, Ron Vernan, Roberta Wallach
- French: Roger Carel (USSSR General, radio announcer, football match commentator), Michel Elias (USSSR General, God, Jesus Christ, Bone Head), William Sabatier (USSSR General), Céline Montsarrat (General of Vaginia), Arlette Thomas (General of Vaginia), Martine Meiraghe (General of Vaginia), Michel Modo (Advisable), Richard Darbois (Conan the Barbarian), Marie-Brigitte Andreï, Luc Bernard, Igor de Savitch, Danièle Dinant, Marcel Guido, Pauline Larrieu, Philippe Peythieu, Jean-Claude Robbe, and Jacques Feyel

== Production ==
After Tarzoon: Shame of the Jungle and The Missing Link, The Big Bang is the third feature by Picha, which includes Picha's typical humor and his love of provocation and nonsense. Picha claims that the film is "the culmination of a trilogy, a mixture of these concerns in the other two films ... a little more tied to the news of the day, only more excessive. The Big Bang is a film about all wars, including personal wars you find in the family."

Production lasted from 1984 to 1986. When the film was released in the UK, the British Board of Film Censors cut the film by 10 seconds to remove a sequence in which an animated version of God appeared to be having sex and then uttered an expletive. After the release of the film, Picha put his theatrical work on hold, choosing to produce television cartoons instead.

== Reception ==
A reviewer in Variety wrote that "the satiric broadsides only sporadically explode with genuine hilarity, and the animation is frequently inferior to Picha's earlier work". Anne Billson described the film as "lamentable" in The Monthly Film Bulletin, while Screen International's Nick Roddick commented that although it "is not a film for anyone who finds it hard to laugh at sexual stereotypes, jokes about mutation and dismemberment, and gags with nuclear explosions as their pay-off [nor] those who dislike graphic (in both senses of the word) blood and guts", "[o]thers should find it quite entertaining".

== Release ==
The film was first released in Danish theaters on March 6, 1987, March 18th in France, April 23rd in West Germany, July 17th in the United Kingdom (London), 1987 in Belgium and Switzerland, and finally 1990 in Hong Kong. The film had a small amount of DVD releases from 2009 - 2011 in countries such as Germany, Benelux, United Kingdom, and the Nordic countries (Denmark, Norway, Sweden, and Finland). It also had a VHS release in Spain in the year 1989, where it included a European Spanish dub that was made at Arcofón (a dubbing studio based in Madrid).
