= Roland Mahauden =

Roland Mahaudan
- Born: 21 October 1942; Etterbeek, Belgium
- Died: 9 November 2018 (aged 76)
- Occupations: Actor; Director

Roland Mahauden (21 October 1942 – 9 November 2018) was a Belgian actor, filmmaker, and stage director.

== Biography ==
Mahauden collaborated with actress Isabelle Paternotte in 1999 to create a project called Article 27 to help poorer members of society can access cultural events under the leadership of Centres d'aide sociale and the French Community Commission (COCOF).

Beginning in 2004, Mahauden helped theatrical awareness campaigns for the Democratic Republic of the Congo, such as Tous en scène pour la paix (All on stage for peace), which highlights the problem of child soldiers in developing nations and reintegration of children into their families, and Un enfant c’est pas sorcier (A child is not a sorcerer), which highlights the problems of witchcraft accusations by churches. He showed these performances at Théâtre de Poche, which he owned up until his death.

== Stage performances ==
At the Théâtre Banlieue

- Deathwatch by Jean Genet
- Remember Me by Michel Tremblay

At the Théâtre de Poche

- Sister Mary Ignatius Explains It All For You by Christopher Durang
- The Art of Love by Ovid (adapted by Michel Grodent)
- L'Apocalypse de Saint-Jean, translated into modern French by Gaston Compère
- Pétition by Václav Havel
- Greek by Steven Berkoff
- Mort de Noël by Franz Xaver Kroetz
- Satires by Juvenal
- Smack ! by Herman Wolf
- L'Argent du Ministre by Philippe Blasband
- Paroles by Pierre Desproges
- Bouches décousues by Jasmine Dubé
- Death and the Maiden by Ariel Dorfman
- Le Sens du partage by Riton Liebman
- Commune à facilités by the author of the 2003 show Contes urbains
- No Man's Land by Danis Tanovic
- Allah Superstar by Y.B.

At the Délégation Générale Wallonie-Bruxelles

- Broken Glass by Alain Mabanckou

== Filmography ==
- The Lonely Killers (Les Tueurs fous) by Boris Szulzinger (1972)
- The Third Cry (Le Troisième Cri) by Igaal Niddam (1973)
- Doctor Justice (Docteur Justice) by Christian-Jacque (1975)
- A Page of Love (Une page d'amour) by Maurice Rabinowicz (1978)
- The Triple Death of the Third Character (La Triple Mort du troisième personnage) by Helvio Soto (1980)
- Headlong Escape (La Fuite en avant) by Christian Zerbib (1983)
