= Weissmuller =

Weissmuller or Weißmüller is a German surname. Notable people with the surname include:

- Johnny Weissmuller (1904–1984), Austro-Hungarian-born American competition swimmer and actor
- Johnny Weissmuller Jr. (1940–2006), American actor and longshoreman
