= Tarzoon: Shame of the Jungle =

1975 film by Picha, Boris Szulzinger

- Theatrical release poster
- Directed by: Picha; Boris Szulzinger
- Written by: French version: Pierre Bartier; Picha; English version: Picha; Anne Beatts; Michael O'Donoghue
- Produced by: Boris Szulzinger
- Starring: Johnny Weissmuller, Jr. John Belushi; Bill Murray; Christopher Guest; Brian Doyle-Murray
- Cinematography: Raymond Burlet
- Edited by: Claude Cohen
- Music by: Marc Moulin; Teddy Lasry
- Production companies: Valisa Films (Belgium); SND (France)
- Distributed by: 20th Century-Fox
- Release dates: 4 September 1975 (France); 14 September 1979 (United States)
- Running time: 85 minutes (Uncut); 72 minutes (Cut version)
- Countries: France; Belgium
- Languages: English; French
- Budget: $1 million

Tarzoon: Shame of the Jungle (French: Tarzoon, la honte de la jungle) is a 1975 adult animated comedy film directed by cartoonist Picha and Boris Szulzinger. It is a parody of Edgar Rice Burroughs' Tarzan. The film was the first foreign-animated film to receive an X rating in the United States (in France, it got a 12 rating).

The original English version (which contained some scenes that were not present on VHS nor DVD) was released first in France, Belgium, The Netherlands, Argentina, and the Nordic countries. The English version featured the voices of Johnny Weissmuller, Jr. (the son of noted Tarzan actor Johnny Weissmuller), with comedians John Belushi, Bill Murray, Christopher Guest, and Brian Doyle-Murray present in the casting.

This film is also known as Jungle Burger in the United Kingdom.

== Plot ==
The film takes place in the deepest part of Africa. The evil, bald, and multi-breasted Queen Bazonga, who resides in a blimp, inside a cave shaped like a woman’s legs spread open revealing her vagina, plans to conquer Earth. Before she can do that, however, she wishes to have a full set of hair so people can take her seriously. Her two-headed assistant, called the Charles of the Pits, suggests a "scalp transplant", an experiment where someone else's hair is transplanted to another person's head. Bazonga demands that she wants the hair of June, the maid of Shame: Ruler of the jungle. Bazonga sends out her penis soldiers to kidnap June.

Meanwhile, June kicks out Shame from their home after another night of unsuccessful sex. She ends up sleeping with Flicka, Shame's monkey pal. The next morning, Bazonga's soldiers barge in and kidnap June, but only after they have an orgy with her. Shame hears June's screams and comes to her rescue, but he is too late. Shame eventually decides to save his mate and immediately sets out on his quest with Flicka.

As he swings through the jungle, an airplane crashes in a giant mud pit, containing a crew of four explorers set out to find Shame. The crew include the eccentric Professor Cedric Addlepate, the ditzy Stephanie Starlet, the grumbling Brutish (who only wants to find Shame for fame), and his assistant Short, a nervous black man. As the crew wander through the jungle, they eventually find Shame. Before they can get acquainted, Brutish and Short step in to take Shame back to the plane, leaving the Professor to be eaten alive by savage monkeys known as "Molarman" while Stephanie is tied up to a tree. The Molar Men catch up with Brutish and Short and eat them both. They free Shame from the cage, but only to try to eat him. Shame is saved by a beer-guzzling fratboy named Craig Baker who flies on a carpet run by a flock of birds. After a lengthy conversation with Shame, Craig gets drunk and falls off the carpet. Shame also falls off, but is saved by Flicka.

Shame and Flicka eventually make it to Bazonga's lair. Flicka is told to stay behind while Shame goes to get June. He has caught Bazonga's soldiers while they were on a practice drill. Shame is taken to Bazonga, who tries to convince Shame to join her side and rule the world with her. Shame says he only wants June, which enrages Bazonga. Shame runs off to find June, who is about to receive the scalp transplant from the bickering Charles of the Pits. Bazonga's soldiers try to stop Shame, which results in the blimp moving and main generator exploding, which sets the place on fire. Bazonga cannot escape from the fire in her office. Shame sees this and saves her by igniting the Emergency Fire Alarm, which sends out more of Bazonga's soldiers to cover themselves in condoms and dive inside Bazonga's vagina until she explodes to death. One of the heads on the Charles of the Pits kills the other while in a heated conversation. Shocked by this, the other head sets June free. They try to escape, but the Charles of the Pits is killed by acid semen shooting all over the place.

Shame eventually finds June, who keeps bickering to Shame while they find a way to escape the blimp, as it drills its way out of the cave and flies all around the jungle. The two find an emergency two-seated parachute, and spring out of the blimp, which finally crashes onto Bazonga's cave, destroying it forever. As June kisses Shame for his bravery, they both spot Stephanie Starlet, who becomes the leader of the Molar Men, and plans to conquer Hollywood.

== Cast ==
Character	English	French
Shame	Johnny Weissmuller, Jr.	Georges Aminel
June	Emily Prager	Arlette Thomas
Queen Bazonga	Pat Bright	Paule Emanuele
Chief M'Bulu	Christopher Guest	Claude Bertrand
Charles of the Pits #1	Brian Doyle-Murray	Pierre Trabaud
Charles of the Pits #2	Andrew Duncan	Roger Carel
Short	Christopher Guest	Roger Carel
Professor Cedric Addlepate	Guy Sorel	Guy Piérauld
Nurse	Christopher Guest	Lita Recio
Brutish	Adolph Caesar	Marc de Georgi
Reporter	Bill Murray	Philippe Dumat
Stephanie Starlet	Judy Graubart	Laurence Badie
Craig Baker	John Belushi	José Géal
Narrator	Bob Perry	Bernard Dhéran

=== Additional voices ===
- Deya Kent
- M. Vernon
- Tony Jackson
- John Baddeley

== Production ==
The film contains the zeuhl song "Tarzoon's March", which was written and performed by Teddy Lasry of the band Magma, featuring lyrics sung in Kobaïan. Alongside the French version, Picha also decided to produce the film in English, as he thought it would've been nice to produce something in "American", and he wanted to give the film an international appeal. The film was ultimately animated to the English soundtrack. The original English version was written and directed by National Lampoon writers Anne Beatts and Michael O'Donoghue, both of whom would later go on to be involved in Saturday Night Live, and it featured both well-known and then-unknown actors in the cast, including Christopher Guest, Brian Doyle-Murray, Adolph Caesar, Bill Murray and John Belushi.

== Release ==
A 15-minute pilot was shown at the 1974 Cannes Film Festival, and the film was finished and released in September 1975 in France and Belgium everywhere with both the English and French version. The film was submitted by the producers to the Academy Awards for their consideration for Best Foreign Language Film. The following year, the estate of Edgar Rice Burroughs sued the producer of Tarzoon and 20th Century-Fox, the film's distributor in France, for alleged plagiarism. The estate lost the case after the French court determined the film was a legitimate parody.

In 1978, the film was imported into the United States by International Harmony and Stuart S. Shapiro. Shapiro recalls telling customs that the film was a work in progress and it would be edited to be suitable for theatrical release in the U.S. He did not remember any problems bringing the film into the country. The distributor encountered problems finding theaters willing to show the X rated version of the film. The film ended up making a profit in San Francisco, but was largely unsuccessful in other towns like Chicago, Philadelphia, Oregon and San Francisco. Much of its success was credited to International Harmony's ad campaign created by writer Edwin Heaven who, similar to Cinemation with Fritz the Cat, used the film's disadvantage (its X rating) to its marketing advantage; radio ads and giant posters plastered all over San Francisco, Chicago, Philadelphia, Oregon proclaimed: "You're going to laugh your X off!"

Eventually, the film was reedited from its original version (which they cut from 85 minutes to 72 minutes). After several changes, the distributor persuaded the MPAA to change the film's rating to an R. The R-rated version of the film removed many shots that contained a lot of animal violence in some way (the ostrich scene for example), and the sex scenes and the native death. Later releases would have these scenes intact but would still have other scenes (which were seen on promo material and production cels) strangely removed. This cut was released in other countries like United Kingdom, Israel, Australia, Brazil, New Zealand, and the Nordic countries.

The Burroughs estate filed another lawsuit demanding that the name of the film be changed when their lawyer found a New York State statute covering disillusion of trademark. They argued that Tarzan was a wholesome trademark and that the current product degraded the character's name. A judge agreed. The suit was filed three weeks into the film's New York run. The title was shortened to Shame of the Jungle, and the "Tarzoon" character name was altered by cutting the name out of the soundtrack negative and splicing it back into the soundtrack upside down. According to Shapiro, this version of the film did not do as well at the box office since audiences were attracted to the "Tarzoon" name. Additionally, theatrical posters for its 1980 UK release were later overstamped, with the original printed publicity slogan "Tarzan And Jane Never Had It So Good!" replaced with a sticker saying "Jungle Legend Exposed!!"

=== Censorship ===
The film was banned by the New Zealand Board of Censors in 1976, but was then finally released on August 16, 1986, with an R16 rating appealed by the Chief Censor of Films.

=== Home media ===
The film was released on VHS by Media Home Entertainment in 1979. In January 2011, the film had its DVD release in the UK by Lace DVD. In fall of 2011, Another World Entertainment released the film (along with The Missing Link and The Big Bang) on DVD in the Benelux and Netherlands.

== Reception ==
When the film premiered some parts of Europe and Latin America, it garnered a lot of positive success, in which it had 1.3 million admissions (making $9 million in France) also ended up selling more tickets in France than The Godfather Part II. Though when the film was released in the US, it received negative reviews and was also a box office bomb. Vincent Canby of The New York Times said that the film was an "unsuccessful attempt to parody the life and adventures of Edgar Rice Burroughs' Tarzan." Tam Allen in The Village Voice called the film "an uncomfortably accurate reflection of that civic eyesore known as toilet art," and compared it unfavorably to Fritz the Cat and Down and Dirty Duck. Playboy praised the film's artwork, but felt that the film became "monotonous after a good start – still, in the off-the-wall category, the most literate prurient and amusing challenge to community standards since Fritz the Cat."
