= Mama Dracula =

- Directed by: Boris Szulzinger
- Written by: Pierre Sterckx; Boris Szulzinger; Marc-Henri Wajnberg
- Produced by: Boris Szulzinger
- Starring: Louise Fletcher; Maria Schneider
- Cinematography: Rufus Bohez; Willy Kurant
- Edited by: Claude Cohen
- Music by: Roy Budd
- Release date: 19 November 1980
- Running time: 90 minutes
- Countries: Belgium; France
- Languages: French; English

Mama Dracula is a 1980 Belgian comedy horror film co-written, produced and directed by Boris Szulzinger.

== Plot ==
The story relates how Mama Dracula (a character based on the life story of Countess Bathory), an enthusiast of rejuvenation baths consisting of the blood of young virgins, must come to terms with a shortage of such blood in the modern era.

== Cast ==
- Louise Fletcher as Mama Dracula
- Maria Schneider as Nancy Hawaï
- Marc-Henri Wajnberg as Vladimir
- Alexander Wajnberg as Ladislas
- Jimmy Shuman as Professor Van Bloed
- Jess Hahn as The Detective
- Michel Israel as Rosa
- Suzy Falk as The Nanny
- Vincent Grass as Fiancé
- Marie-Françoise Manuel as Virginie
- José Gral as The Innkeeper
- William Del Visco as The psychiatrist

== Soundtrack ==
The CD soundtrack composed by Roy Budd is available on Music Box Records label.
