= A Free Woman =

- Directed by: Vittorio Cottafavi
- Written by: Oreste Biancoli; Fabrizio Sarazani
- Story by: Malena Sandor
- Produced by: Fortunato Misiano
- Starring: Françoise Christophe
- Cinematography: Guglielmo Garroni
- Music by: Ezio Carabella
- Release date: 29 December 1954 (Italy)
- Country: Italy
- Language: Italian

A Free Woman (Italian: Una donna libera) is a 1954 Italian melodrama film directed by Vittorio Cottafavi. The film's sets were designed by the art director Dario Cecchi. In 2008, the film was included on the Italian Ministry of Cultural Heritage’s 100 Italian films to be saved, a list of 100 films that "have changed the collective memory of the country between 1942 and 1978."

== Cast ==
- Françoise Christophe as Liana Franci
- Pierre Cressoy as Gerardo Villabruna
- Gino Cervi as Massimo Marchi
- Elisa Cegani as Madre di Liana
- Lianella Carell as Solange
- Christine Carère as Leonora Franci
- Galeazzo Benti as Sergio Rollini
