= The Sahara Is Burning =

1961 film

- Directed by: Michel Gast
- Written by: Michel Gast; Jean Lartéguy
- Based on: Le Sahara brûle by Gilles Perrault
- Produced by: Louis Guéguen; Josette Trachsler
- Starring: Paul Guers; Jean Servais; Magali Noël
- Cinematography: Marc Fossard
- Edited by: Eliane Bensdorp
- Music by: Alain Goraguer
- Production company: C.T.I.
- Distributed by: Lux Compagnie Cinématographique de France
- Release date: 18 January 1961
- Running time: 103 minutes
- Country: France
- Language: French

The Sahara Is Burning (French: Le Sahara brûle) is a 1961 French adventure film directed by Michel Gast and starring Paul Guers, Jean Servais and Magali Noël. It is based on a novel of the same title by Gilles Perrault. It was made at the Boulogne Studios in Paris and on location took place in the desert outside Hassi Messaoud in Algeria. The film's sets were designed by the art directors Sydney Bettex and René Moulaert.

== Synopsis ==
The young engineer Lucas Rimbaud is sent to the Sahara Desert to investigate whether the drilling for petroleum should continue or the project brought to a halt. Subsequently, a massive fire breaks out in the facility.

== Cast ==
- Paul Guers as Lucas Rimbaud
- Jean Servais as Wagner
- Magali Noël as Lénq
- Jean Daurand as Bouthier
- Jess Hahn as Jeff Gordon
- Jean-Marie Amato as Duval
- Georges Aminel as Ahmed
- Harald Wolff as Peter
- Robert Porte as Pénélope
- Pierre Doris as Joubert
- Marcel Bozzuffi as Gomez
- Guy Mairesse as Hans
- René-Jean Chauffard as Paulin

== Bibliography ==
- Goble, Alan. The Complete Index to Literary Sources in Film. Walter de Gruyter, 1999.
- Rège, Philippe. Encyclopedia of French Film Directors, Volume 1. Scarecrow Press, 2009.
