= Scandal on the Champs-Élysées =

1949 film

- Directed by: Roger Blanc
- Written by: Robert Siegfried; Robert Beauvais; Jacques Celhay
- Produced by: Pierre Delannoy
- Starring: Pierre Renoir; Françoise Christophe; Guy Decomble
- Cinematography: Marcel Weiss
- Edited by: Pierre Delannoy
- Music by: Paul Durand
- Production company: Général Films
- Distributed by: National Film Distribution
- Release date: 22 April 1949
- Running time: 95 minutes
- Country: France
- Language: French

Scandal on the Champs-Élysées (French: Scandale aux Champs-Élysées) is a 1949 French crime drama film directed by Roger Blanc and starring Pierre Renoir, Françoise Christophe and Guy Decomble.

It was shot at the Billancourt Studios in Paris. The film's sets were designed by the art director Lucien Aguettand.

== Synopsis ==
After the murder of two models working in the famous fashion house of Dominique Airelle, Inspector Pascaud is called in to investigate. His suspicions fall on a number of candidates.

== Cast ==
- Pierre Renoir as Dominique Airelle
- Françoise Christophe as Françoise
- Guy Decomble as Pascaud
- Jean Parédès as Étienne
- André Gabriello as Vincent
- Jacques Fath as Thierry
- Christiane Barry as Jacqueline
- Agnès Laury as Monique
- René Alié as Le Sud-Américain
- Jacqueline Carlier as Yvonne
- Annette Delattre as Lise
- José Casa as Le commissaire
- Roger Rafal as Le juge d'instruction
- Colette Régis as Suzanne
- Marion Tourès as Jenny
- Anouk Ferjac as Colette

== Bibliography ==
- Rège, Philippe. Encyclopedia of French Film Directors, Volume 1. Scarecrow Press, 2009.
