= Michel Gast =

French film director

- Born: 21 July 1930; Saint-Satur, Cher, France
- Died: 10 March 2022 (aged 91); Gournay-sur-Marne, Seine-Saint-Denis, France
- Other name: Michel Gaston
- Occupations: Director, Screenwriter, Producer
- Years active: 1952–1981 (film)

Michel Gast (1930–2022) was a French film director, screenwriter and producer. He was one of the producers of the 1978 film Raoni which was nominated for the Academy Award for Best Documentary Feature Film at the 1978 Oscars. Later in his career he worked as a dubbing director for films released in France.

== Selected filmography ==
- I Spit on Your Grave (1959)
- The Sahara Is Burning (1961)
- Céleste (1970)
- The Lonely Killers (1972)
- Tears of Blood (1972)
- La maison des amants (1972)
- Raoni (1978)
- The Hamburg Syndrome (1979)
- The Missing Link (1980)
- Chaste and Pure (1981)

== Bibliography ==
- Rège, Philippe. Encyclopedia of French Film Directors, Volume 1. Scarecrow Press, 2009.
