= Céleste (1970 film) =

1970 film

- Directed by: Michel Gast
- Written by: Michel Gast
- Produced by: Jenny Gérard
- Starring: Débora Duarte; Jean Rochefort; Lea Massari
- Cinematography: Marc Fossard
- Edited by: Claude Cohen
- Music by: Guy Pedersen
- Production companies: Arvo Film; Pegaso Films
- Distributed by: Parafrance Films; Cinerad
- Release date: 10 December 1970
- Running time: 90 minutes
- Countries: France; Italy
- Language: French

Céleste (Italian: Un soffio di piacere) is a 1970 French-Italian comedy film directed by Michel Gast and starring Débora Duarte, Jean Rochefort and Lea Massari. It was shot in Eastmancolor. The film's sets were designed by the art director Raoul Albert.

== Synopsis ==
Georges Cazenave, is a superficial French television reporter who enjoys the good life and his relationship with his mistress Hélène. All this turns on its head when he hires Céleste, a Portuguese housemaid. He soon discovers that she is secretly a communist activist plotting against the Estado Novo dictatorship of António de Oliveira Salazar in her native country. The two fall in love, adding chaos to the previously simple life of Georges.

== Cast ==
- Débora Duarte as Céleste Pereira
- Jean Rochefort as Georges Cazenave
- Lea Massari as Hélène
- Anne-Marie Coffinet as Marie-Jeanne
- Philippe Ogouz as Antoine
- Gabriel Cattand as Maître Moret
- David José as Le barbu
- Philippe Dumat as Bonneval
- Perrette Pradier as Catherine
- Raymond Gérôme as Le chef des barbouzes français
- Harry-Max as Le préposé des bains-douches
- Marianik Revillon as Sarah
- Arlette Thomas as La logeuse de Céleste
- Bernard Tiphaine as Un barbouze

== Bibliography ==
- Bessy, Maurice, Chirat, Raymond & Bernard, André. Histoire du cinéma français: encyclopédie des films 1966-1970. Pygmalion, 1986.
- Rège, Philippe. Encyclopedia of French Film Directors, Volume 1. Scarecrow Press, 2009.
