= Claude Bertrand (actor) =

French actor (1919–1986)

- Born: Claude Ernest Bertrand; 24 March 1919; Gréasque, France
- Died: 14 December 1986 (aged 67); Montpellier, France
- Occupation: Actor
- Years active: 1946–1985

Claude Bertrand (24 March 1919 – 14 December 1986) was a French actor. In a career that has spanned four decades, Bertrand was best known in French film and television as a voice over actor. He was the French dub for Roger Moore, Charles Bronson, John Wayne, Bud Spencer and Burt Lancaster. He also shared his voice in animation, he provided the voice of Baloo in the French version of The Jungle Book, O'Malley in The Aristocats and Little John in Robin Hood. He also voiced Captain Haddock in Tintin and the Temple of the Sun and Tintin and the Lake of Sharks.

He also dubbed Roger Moore into French in the James Bond series between 1973 and 1985.

Bertrand died in 1986 after suffering from cancer.

== Filmography ==
=== Film ===
- L'échafaud peut attendre (1949)
- Le Secret de Mayerling (1949) - (uncredited)
- Les mousquetaires du roi (1951)
- Spartaco (1951) - (French version, voice)
- The Love of a Woman (1953) - André Lorenzi (voice, uncredited)
- Le Couteau sous la gorge (1955) - Machecoul
- Marguerite de la nuit (1955) - Roger (uncredited)
- Dynamite Jack (1961) - Dynamite Jack (voice, uncredited)
- Paris brûle-t-il? (1966)
- Martin soldat (1966) - Galland
- Caroline chérie (1968) - Le municipal de la prison (uncredited)
- Le gendarme se marie (1968) - Poussin Bleu
- Tintin and the Temple of the Sun (1969) - Le capitaine Haddock (voice)
- And Soon the Darkness (1970) - Lassal
- L'Amour l'après-midi (1972) - The Male Student
- Tintin and the Lake of Sharks (1972) - Capitaine Haddock (voice)
- The Three Musketeers (1973) - Porthos (voice)
- Tarzoon: Shame of the Jungle (1975) - Le chef M'Bulu (French version, voice)
- The Twelve Tasks of Asterix (1976) - Un sénateur et le centurion (voice)
- Police Python 357 (1976) - Le marchand de cochons
- Sexuella (1976)
- Une robe noire pour un tueur (1981)
- Le Maître d'école (1981) - Le père de Charlotte

=== Animation ===
- Tintin and the Temple of the Sun (1969)
- Tintin and the Lake of Sharks (1972)
- Tarzoon: Shame of the Jungle (1975)
- The Twelve Tasks of Asterix (1976)
- The Jungle Book (1967) French voice of Baloo
- The Aristocats (1970) French voice of Thomas O'Malley
- Robin Hood (1973) French voice of Little John
