= White Cargo (1958 film) =

1958 film

- Directed by: Georges Lacombe
- Written by: Jacques Sigurd
- Produced by: Francis Lopez
- Starring: Françoise Arnoul; Renée Faure; Jean-Claude Michel
- Cinematography: Roger Hubert
- Edited by: Denise Baby
- Music by: Francis Lopez
- Production companies: Compagnie Générale Cinématographique; Filmel; Les Productions Francis Lopez; Films Mars
- Distributed by: Compagnie Commerciale Française Cinématographique
- Release date: 18 February 1958
- Running time: 92 minutes
- Country: France
- Language: French

White Cargo (French: Cargaison blanche) is a 1958 French crime drama film directed by Guy Lacombe and starring Françoise Arnoul, Renée Faure and Jean-Claude Michel. The film's sets were designed by the art director Raymond Nègre. It is a remake of the 1937 film of the same title. It is also known in English by the alternative title Illegal Cargo.

== Main cast ==
- Françoise Arnoul as Françoise
- Renée Faure as Mme Ploit
- Jean-Claude Michel as Pierre
- Judith Magre as Dora
- Jean-Claude Brialy as Jean
- Michel Salina as M. Paul
- Clément Harari as Un client
- Germaine Kerjean as Irma
- Henri San Juan as Un malfrat
- Georges Aminel as José
- Georges Rivière as Raymond
- Colette Mars as Mado
- Harry-Max as Un employé de l'imprimerie

== Bibliography ==
- Goble, Alan. The Complete Index to Literary Sources in Film. Walter de Gruyter, 1999.
- Rège, Philippe. Encyclopedia of French Film Directors, Volume 1. Scarecrow Press, 2009.
