= Françoise Christophe =

French actress (1923–2012)

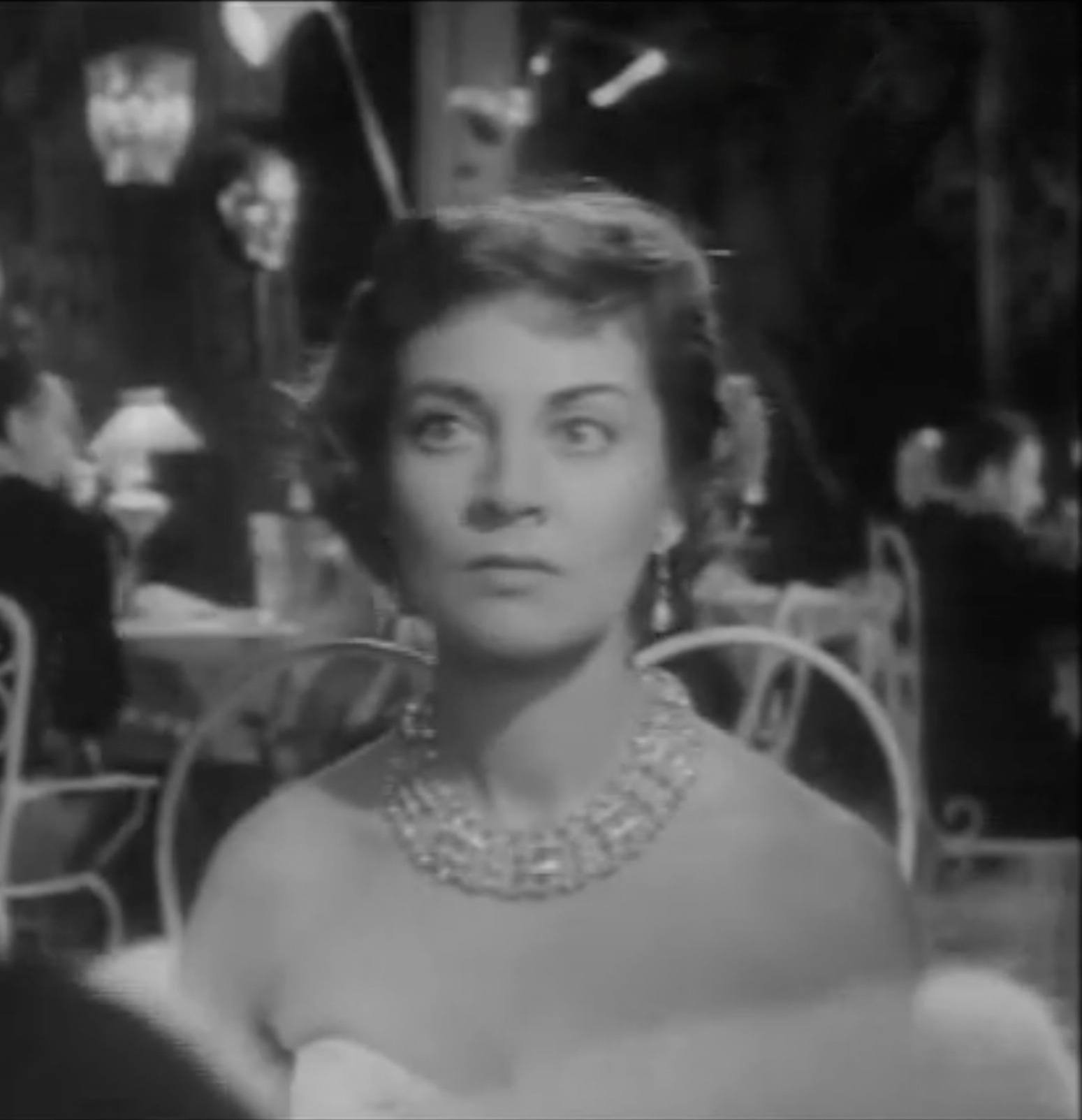
- Christophe in A Free Woman (1954)
- Born: 3 February 1923; Paris, France
- Died: 8 January 2012 (aged 88); Paris, France
- Occupation: Actress
- Years active: 1941–2008

Françoise Christophe (3 February 1923 – 8 January 2012) was a French film and television actress. She was the elder sister of the actress Paule Emanuele.

== Partial filmography ==
- Premier rendez-vous (1941) - Une pensionnaire de l'orphelinat (uncredited)
- Love Marriage (1942) - La secrétaire
- Fantômas (1947) - La princesse Daniloff
- Une jeune fille savait (1948) - Jacqueline
- Carrefour du crime (1948) - Nelly
- Scandal on the Champs-Élysées (1949) - Françoise
- Mademoiselle de La Ferté (1949) - Galswinthe
- The Beautiful Image (1951) - Renée Cérusier
- Victor (1951) - Françoise Pélicier
- Leathernose (1952) - Judith de Rieusses
- Jouons le jeu (1952) - L'actrice (segment 'La fidélité')
- Les amours finissent à l'aube (1953) - Alberte Guéret
- A Free Woman (1954) - Liana Franci
- La rue des bouches peintes (1955) - Lady Blanche Wilburn / Lydia
- Walk Into Paradise (1956) - Dr. Louise Dumarcet
- The Possessors (1958) - Jacqueline Schoudler
- Testament of Orpheus (1960) - L'infirmière / The Nurse (uncredited)
- Three Faces of Sin (1961) - Une invitée au vernissage
- The Three Musketeers (1961) - Anne d'Autriche
- Erik the Conqueror (1961) - Regina Alice
- Fiesta (1965) - La douairière
- King of Hearts (1966) - La Duchesse
- Fantômas contre Scotland Yard (1967) - Lady Dorothy MacRashley
- Darling Caroline (1968) - Madame Chabanne
- Borsalino (1970) - Simone Escarguel
- Aussi loin que l'amour (1971) - La cliente
- Seven Deaths in the Cat's Eye (1973) - Lady Mary MacGrieff
- The Wings of the Dove (1981) - La mère de Marc
- Les pyramides bleues (1988) - Mother Superior
- Try This One for Size (1989) - Jenny
- Les amies de ma femme (1992) -La mère d'Edmée / Edmée's mother
- The Best Job in the World (1996) - Mme Davant, la mère d'Hélène
- Charmant garçon (2001) - Old lady in the park
- Hello Goodbye (2008) - La mère d'Alain (final film role)

== Bibliography ==
- Goble, Alan. The Complete Index to Literary Sources in Film. Walter de Gruyter, 1999.
