= Victor (1951 film) =

1951 French film directed by Claude Heymann

- Directed by: Claude Heymann
- Written by: Henri Bernstein (play); Jean Ferry; Claude Heymann
- Produced by: Gilbert Cohen-Seat
- Starring: Jean Gabin; Françoise Christophe; Jacques Castelot; Brigitte Auber
- Cinematography: Lucien Joulin
- Edited by: Suzanne de Troeye
- Music by: Marc Lanjean
- Production companies: MAIC; Orsay Films
- Release date: 13 June 1951
- Running time: 90 minutes
- Country: France
- Language: French

Victor is a 1951 French comedy-drama film directed by Claude Heymann and starring Jean Gabin, Françoise Christophe and Jacques Castelot.

== Cast ==
In alphabetical order

- Brigitte Auber as Marianne
- Jacques Castelot as Marc Pélicier
- Françoise Christophe as Françoise Pélicier
- Jacques Denoël as Le garçon de café
- Jean Gabin as Victor
- Camille Guérini as Gratien
- René Hell
- Gaston Modot as Le patron du café
- Pierre Mondy as Un détenu
- Jacques Morel as Jacques Genoust
- Liane Morice
- Jane Morlet as La concierge
- Jean-Paul Moulinot as Le directeur de la banque

== Bibliography ==
- Goble, Alan. The Complete Index to Literary Sources in Film. Walter de Gruyter, 1999.
