= The Lonely Killers =

1972 Belgian film by Boris Szulzinger

- Theatrical release poster
- Directed by: Boris Szulzinger
- Written by: Pierre Bartier; Michel Gast; Boris Szulzinger
- Produced by: Boris Szulzinger
- Starring: Georges Aminel
- Release date: 2 June 1972
- Running time: 82 minutes
- Country: Belgium
- Language: French

The Lonely Killers (French: Les tueurs fous) is a 1972 Belgian crime film directed by Boris Szulzinger. The film was selected as the Belgian entry for the Best Foreign Language Film at the 45th Academy Awards, but was not nominated.

== Cast ==
- Georges Aminel as Le journaliste
- Georges Aubert
- Marc Audier
- Christian Barbier as L'ouvrier
- Roland Mahauden
- Patricia Cornelis
- Marc de Géorgi
- Marc Delsaert
- Jean Droze
- Daniel Dury
- Franz Gouvy
- Daniel Horowitz
- Hubert Jeuken

== See also ==
- List of submissions to the 45th Academy Awards for Best Foreign Language Film
- List of Belgian submissions for the Academy Award for Best Foreign Language Film
