= Wildfire (1988 film) =

- Directed by: Zalman King
- Written by: Zalman King; Matthew Bright
- Produced by: Jerry Tokofsky
- Starring: Steven Bauer; Linda Fiorentino
- Cinematography: Bill Butler
- Edited by: William D. Gordean; Danford B. Greene
- Music by: Maurice Jarre
- Release date: September 2, 1988 (Montréal World Film Festival)
- Language: English

Wildfire is a 1988 American romance drama film directed by Zalman King and starring Steven Bauer and Linda Fiorentino.

== Cast ==
- Steven Bauer as Frank
- Linda Fiorentino as Kay
- Will Patton as Mike
- Marshall Bell as Lewis
- Richard Bradford as Gene
- Sandra Seacat as Sissy
- Ken Thorley as Bernie
- Johnny Weissmuller, Jr. as Bounty Hunter
- Juan Fernández as Man In Cantina
- Nancy Fish as Roberta
- Dennis Holahan as Mitch
- Dorothy Meyer as Esther
- Iris Butler as Psychologist
- Angelica Marden as Amanda
- Calvin Collins as Josh
- O-Lan Jones as Mrs. Johnson
