= Johnny Weissmuller Jr. =

American actor and longshoreman

- Born: János Weissmüller Jr. September 23, 1940; San Francisco, California, U.S.
- Died: July 27, 2006 (aged 65)
- Occupations: Actor, longshoreman
- Years active: 1958–1988
- Parents: Johnny Weissmuller (father); Beryl Scott (mother)

János "Johnny" Weissmüller Jr. (September 23, 1940 – July 27, 2006) was an American actor and longshoreman. He also authored a book about his father, the five-time Olympic Games gold medalist Johnny Weissmuller.

== Biography ==
Weissmuller was born in San Francisco, where his father was performing at the Golden Gate International Exposition in a water ballet show called Billy Rose's Aquacade. His mother was Beryl Scott, the third of his father's five wives. The younger Weissmuller graduated from the University of Southern California in Los Angeles, where he was on the swim team. He joined the United States Navy, using his swimming acumen to specialize in underwater demolition.

In 1958, Weissmuller Jr. got his first screen role in the Mickey Rooney film Andy Hardy Comes Home. In 1961, he appeared in the episode "The Four" with Jack Elam in the western series, Lawman, starring John Russell. He also worked as a stuntman before moving to San Francisco where he worked as a longshoreman. His subsequent credits include parts in THX 1138 (1971) and the 1973 hit American Graffiti (as one of two car thieves who fight Charles Martin Smith and Paul Le Mat). He also provided the voice of Shame in the English language version of the X-rated cartoon Tarzoon: Shame of the Jungle (1975). Weissmuller Jr. also appeared as a guest star in two episodes of The Streets of San Francisco. His last movie role was as a bounty hunter in the 1988 release Wildfire.

He also appeared in Bay Area stage productions. His longest-running stage role was as Chief Bromden in One Flew Over the Cuckoo's Nest at the Little Fox Theater in San Francisco. Weissmuller Jr. also belonged to yacht clubs in San Francisco, Hawaii and Acapulco, taking part in several Transpac yacht races from California to Hawaii.

Weissmuller Jr.'s memoir, Tarzan, My Father, was published in 2002 by ECW Press in Toronto, Ontario. In 2005, he retired from the docks to begin writing a book about work as a longshoreman. He died from liver cancer on July 27, 2006, aged 65. He was married to Diane Weissmuller and had a daughter, Heidi Medsker, and a stepson.

== Filmography ==
Year	Title	Role	Notes
1958	Andy Hardy Comes Home	Jimmy 'Jim'	
1971	THX 1138	Chrome Robot	
1973	American Graffiti	Badass #1	
1973	Magnum Force	Palancio's Hitter	Uncredited
1975	Tarzoon: Shame of the Jungle	Shame	
1984	Massive Retaliation	Virgil Griffin	
1985	Ewoks: The Battle for Endor	Marauder Card Player #2	
1988	Wildfire	Bounty Hunter	
2006	GI Jesús	Passenger - Plane	(final film role)
