= Paule Emanuele =

French actress (born 1927)

- Born: Paule-Marie Christophe; 14 May 1927 (age 98); Fontenay-aux-Roses, France
- Occupation: Actress
- Years active: 1951–present
- Spouse: Jean-Claude Michel (died 1999)
- Children: 3
- Relatives: Françoise Christophe (sister)

Paule-Marie Christophe (born 14 May 1927) is a French actress. Her voice was used in several animated and live-actions films to dub actresses that included Elizabeth Taylor, Shelley Winters, Lauren Bacall and Lois Maxwell.

== Life and career ==
Emanuele was born on 1927 in Fontenay-aux-Roses. She began her career on stage playing in various dramas by greats dramaturges like Jean Marsan, Noël Coward, Diego Fabbri etc. She appeared in cinema playing supporting roles in movies such as Desperate Decision (1952), The Soft Skin (1964) and The Weeding Ring (1970).

Later she began dubbing foreign films in the French language, of which the most well-known was actress Lois Maxwell in the role of Miss Moneypenny in all the James Bond film series. Other different names that she has dubbed have been Elizabeth Taylor in The Blue Bird, Boom!, Who's Afraid of Virginia Woolf? and Night Watch. Shelley Winters in Bloody Mama, A Patch of Blue. Lauren Bacall in Sex and the Single Girl and Harper.

For Disney classic animated films she voice Queen of Hearts in Alice in Wonderland, Aunt Sarah in Lady and the Tramp, Flora in Sleeping Beauty and Big Mama in The Fox and the Hound (1981).

== Personal life ==
She was the younger sister of actress Françoise Christophe. She married French actor Jean-Claude Michel until his death in 1999. They had three children.

== Filmography ==
- Darling Caroline (1951)
- Desperate Decision (1952)
- Les Compagnes de la nuit (1953)
- Secrets of a French nurse (1958) - Doctorwoman
- The Giant of Marathon (1959) - Karis
- The Soft Skin (1964) - Odile
- The Most Beautiful Month (1968)
- The Weeding Ring (1970) - Madame Sedaine
- Asterix and the Big Fight (1989)
- Corto Maltese: Secret Court of the Arcanes (2002) - Mme. Hu
