= Georges Aminel =

French actor (1922–2007)

- Born: Jacques Georges Maline; 11 October 1922; Clichy, Hauts-de-Seine, France
- Died: 20 May 2007 (aged 84); Paris, France
- Occupation: Actor
- Years active: 1941–1993

Georges Aminel (11 October 1922 – 20 May 2007) was a French actor and voice actor.

== Biography ==
Born to a Martinican father and a Parisian mother, Aminel debuted on stage in 1941.

Aminel gained in fame in 1958 with the play Negro Spiritual. During the 1950s and 1960s, he was hired by major stage directors such as Jean-Louis Barrault and Raymond Rouleau, and performed in classic plays by Paul Claudel or Shakespeare. He also played supporting roles in film and on television and worked extensively in dubbing, becoming one of the most familiar French voice actors. Nevertheless, his career on stage and screen was limited by his skin color: Aminel later commented that, being of mixed ethnicity, he was often perceived as being either too black or not black enough for the roles he played. He was cast in a variety of exotic roles, from Polynesians to South Americans and, to his frustration, occasionally had to wear make-up to make his skin appear darker.

Aminel was the first black actor to be a member of the Comédie-Française, which he joined in 1967. In 1972, he played the lead role in Oedipus Rex: the play was poorly received by critics and Aminel was replaced by Claude Giraud after a few days. Rattled by this experience, Aminel decided to resign from the Comédie-Française just when he was about to become a sociétaire. He later worked essentially as a voice actor.

In dubbing, Aminel voiced actors such as Yul Brynner, Lee Marvin, Orson Welles and Vittorio Gassman, and was particularly known as the French voice of Sylvester the Cat and Darth Vader, voicing the latter character in The Empire Strikes Back, Return of the Jedi and the final scenes of Revenge of the Sith.

== Selected filmography ==
- Dangerous Turning (1954)
- The Little Rebels (1955)
- Love in Jamaica (1957)
- White Cargo (1958)
- The Sahara Is Burning (1961)
- Action Man (1967)
- The Butterfly Affair (1970)
- The Lonely Killers (1972)
- The Gates of Fire (1972)
- Tarzoon: Shame of the Jungle (1975)
- Parisian Life (1977)
- The Missing Link (1980)

== Bibliography ==
- Melissa E. Biggs. French films, 1945-1993: a critical filmography of the 400 most important releases. McFarland & Company, 1996.
