= Snow White: The Sequel =

2007 film directed by Picha

- Theatrical release poster
- Directed by: Picha
- Written by: Tony Hendra; Picha
- Produced by: Grzegorz Handzlik; Eric van Beuren; Linda Van Tulden; Steve Walsh; Arlette Zylberberg
- Starring: Cécile de France; Jean-Paul Rouve; Stephen Fry; Rik Mayall
- Edited by: Chantal Hymans
- Music by: Willie Dowling
- Distributed by: Rézo Films (France); Cinéart (Belgium)
- Release date: January 31, 2007
- Running time: 82 minutes
- Countries: United Kingdom; Belgium; France
- Languages: English, French

Snow White: The Sequel - (French: Blanche-Neige, la suite) is a 2007 adult animated comedy film directed by Picha. It is based on the fairy tale of Snow White and intended as a sequel to Disney's classic animated adaptation. However, like all of Picha's cartoons, the film is actually a sex comedy featuring a lot of bawdy jokes and sex scenes.

== Synopsis ==
Prince Charming was supposed to live long and happily with Snow White after kissing her back to life. However, the jealous "good" fairy decides that she and the prince were meant to be, which is only the start of a whole series of perversions of various fairy tale characters' traditional good nature. The bad dwarves (Horny, Grungy, Scummy, Filthy, Funky, Spotty and Mental) suddenly become a greedy, blackmailing loan shark syndicate. Sleeping Beauty is now a hypocritical, overly virtuous, selfish Princess. Cinderella's case is more than just a 'rags to riches' story. The Prince must figure out how to deal with all of these problems and more to get back to his sweet, innocent, uncomplicated Snow White.

== Cast ==
Character	Original	*French
Snow White	Sally Ann Marsh	Cécile De France
Snow White	Jackie Sheridan (singing)	Anaïs (singing)
Sleeping Beauty	Lia Williams	Cécile De France
Cinderella	Shelley Blond	Cécile De France
Prince Charming	Simon Greenall	Jean-Paul Rouve
The Good Fairy	Morwenna Banks	Marie Vincent
The Bad Seven Dwarves	Rik Mayall	Jean-Claude Donda; Gérard Surugue
The great Huntsman	Unknown	Jean-Claude Donda
Narrator	Stephen Fry	Benoît Allemane
Hannibal the Ogre	Michael Kilgarriff	Marc Alfos
The beast	Unknown	François Barbin
The beautiful	Unknown	Mona Walravens
Tom Thumb	Unknown	Sasha Supera

=== *Recorded after the English version ===
Source:

=== Additional English Voices ===
- Robert Bathurst
- Philip Bretherton
- David Carling
- April Ford
- Tom George
- Sarah Hadland
- Vicki Hopps
- Simon Schatzberger
- Jimmy Hibbert

=== Additional French Voices ===
- Jean-Claude Donda
- Gérard Surugue
- Agathe Schumacher
- Michel Tugot-Doris
- Nicolas Beaucaire
- Olivier Cordina
