= Boris Szulzinger =

Belgian author, filmmaker and film producer

- Szulzinger in 1975
- Born: 20 September 1945; Brussels, Belgium
- Died: 29 June 2023 (aged 77)
- Occupation: Film director
- Years active: 1969–1987

Boris Szulzinger was a Belgian author, film director and producer. He was known for The Lonely Killers (1972) and Tarzoon: Shame of the Jungle (1975, directed with Picha). He was the founder of the group Cinédit with Boris Lehman.

== Filmography ==
- Nathalie après l'amour (1969) (as Michael B. Sanders) (Note: Known as Love Under Age (USA) and Nathalie After Love)
- Les tueurs fous (1972) (Note: Known as The Lonely Killers in English)
- Tarzoon, la honte de la jungle (1975) (Note: Also known as Jungle Burger (UK), Shame of the Jungle, and Tarzoon: Shame of the Jungle (USA))
- Mama Dracula (1980) with Louise Fletcher
- The Big Bang (1987)
