= Food Will Win the War =

- Directed by: Hamilton Luske
- Story by: Dick Kinney
- Produced by: Walt Disney
- Narrated by: Fred Shields
- Music by: Paul J. Smith
- Animation by: Ward Kimball; Eric Larson; Jack Hannah; Milt Kahl
- Color process: Technicolor
- Production company: Walt Disney Studios
- Release date: July 21, 1942
- Running time: 6 minutes
- Country: United States
- Language: English

Food Will Win the War is an American short animated film produced by Walt Disney Studios and released on July 21, 1942, seven months and two weeks after the December 7, 1941 attack on Pearl Harbor. The 6-minute short was one of a series of animated films produced by Disney during the war as part of a propaganda campaign. The animation was produced on order of the Department of Agriculture, first and foremost to educate about the importance of American agriculture in the war effort and also, to offset fears and panic of Americans who thought too many supplies were being sent overseas. The film was a morale boosting production, in the hope of improving public mood and opinion about sacrifice for the war effort.

== Credits ==
- Directed by: Hamilton Luske
- Produced by: Walt Disney
- Story: Dick Kinney
- Music: Paul J. Smith

== Cast ==
- Fred Shields – Narrator (Voice)

== Plot ==
The plot provides unlikely and bizarre examples to express the importance of farming. It begins with a description of the world at ruin and explains the solution to those around the world that American agriculture was a beacon of hope in the darkest hour, thus it was important that agricultural production continued to grow. The bizarre examples of impressive production emphasised this: Enough bread to build several pyramids, which if built a mile apart would reach the Suez Canal; enough corn to stretch from London to the Black Sea. A little girl on an American diet is shown outweighing a warship, emphasizing her size; reiterating the point that there is enough food in America to send ¼ of production abroad. The animation finished with a sense of patriotism and pride, explaining that the war is a fight to maintain the American values that are so highly prized. 'Food for freedom' underpins the whole ideology of the animation. American agriculture will win the Allies the war, and consequently, American freedom will not perish under the Nazi dictatorship.

=== Animation techniques ===
The film uses a series of techniques to enhance the message that it was trying to send to those watching. Firstly, the animation itself, by using Disney the film was made both entertaining and informative. The sense of humor which emerges from the film depicts the defeat of the Axis through humorous examples of agricultural production. Throughout the war it was important to depict the opposition as humorous, as well as being weak to improve public morale at home. Other techniques are also involved in the film, most noticeably the music being played in the background. A militaristic tone offers a sense of patriotism to the watcher and increases the patriotic message within the whole film. Additionally, the use of contrasting colors is extremely effective in representing America as the savior to the Allied war effort. The film begins with a dark and destructive world with negative imagery to match, but a sudden change reveals a bright colorful screen representing the glimmer of hope that American agriculture offers the war effort.

== Background ==
America entered World War 2 on December 8, 1941, after a Japanese attack on Pearl Harbor. Many Americans were reluctant to enter another European war, and preferred a non-interventionist policy towards it, but the devastating and unprovoked attack on Pearl Harbor, which was described by President Franklin D. Roosevelt as a date that will live in infamy, changed public opinion.

=== Disney ===
Upon America's entrance into the war, Disney was contracted to produce propaganda pieces to gain support for the war and aid recruitment. This was often done through the use of Anti-Nazi propaganda – public opinion polls at the time showed that despite America's anti-war approach, 72% of people preferred the defeat of the Nazis rather than no war and the resulting defeat of the Allies. By 1942, government departments began their own projects with Disney to increase support for the War effort and improve morale on the Home front. The United States Department of Agriculture produced 'Food will Win the War'. The animation was made very quickly, but with morale being low fast production was imperative. Furthermore, agriculture was not the primary topic for propaganda, it was to provide an explanation as to why America was fighting a war in Europe.

=== American economy ===
America supplied Great Britain and other allies in the war through the Lend-lease 1941, but America would also need to supply its own army. The expectation of America to supply goods abroad through the lend lease agreement, made those on the home front concerned about possible shortages. The fears were unfounded, American agricultural produced a surplus of goods. Figures show that exports of domestic products quadrupled from 1935 to 1945, demonstrating the continuous growth of output and production.

=== German economy ===
In contrast, German agricultural was reliant upon external alliances throughout the war. Britain's blockade of German naval bases seriously restricted Germany from world markets. In the early war years Germany had a surplus amount of grain and raw materials which had been supplied by the USSR, their declaration of war on the USSR in 1941 halted this process. Expectedly, this resulted in substantial grain shortages both at home and abroad. The shortages were made worse in April 1942, when poor harvests from previous years and a lack of supplies from abroad resulted in rations being cut, "this delivered a potentially damaging blow to the morale of the civilian population". Agricultural production and sufficient supplies were key for morale, on the home front and on the front line. This issue is explored rather comically in this film.

=== Labor force ===
Conscription in both Germany and the United States by 1942 resulted in a shortage of labor. Both women and children were drafted onto the farms as laborers to help maintain production levels. As Russell Buchanan says: "Women and children being drafted on to farms was one essential factor for agriculture not to drop below the adequate level". Alternatively, by 1939 women made up 37.4% of the total labor force in Germany. However, due to a sense of grievance through lower pay and long hours resulting in the neglect of families, women's labor did not increase throughout the war. The Nazi party made numerous attempts to increase the size of women's labor through patriotic propaganda, but they were unsuccessful. Adolf Hitler was reluctant to conscript women to Labor therefore alternatives had to be considered.

Year	Number of women workers
1940	5689
1941	5369
1942	5673
1943	5665
1944	5694

Table is showing the stagnant number of women workers in Germany from 1940 to 1944. Instead the Nazis incorporated Polish labor for agricultural work and after the defeat of France in 1940, one million French POWs (Prisoners of War) were drafted into German agriculture.

=== Propaganda ===
In the Second World War propaganda had a key role for both the Allies and the Axis powers. Both were aware of the effect that propaganda could have on the war effort, especially on the home front where it would boost morale. The Second World War witnessed the greatest propaganda battle in the history of warfare – all participants involved in the conflict used propaganda like never before. All sides in the conflict were aware of the importance of propaganda to the war effort. The struggle for hearts and minds of belligerent societies intensified unlike ever before. Leaders realised it was important to censor out any negative propaganda that may affect public morale while at the same time ensuring mood was positive on the home front. Propaganda was used in a variety of methods, but the most prominent became animations, especially within America. Franklin D. Roosevelt noted that "the motion picture industry would become the most powerful propaganda tool, whether it tries to or not". America utilised the motion picture at best. Disney Studio's produced 62,000 metres of film, more than five times of that produced in times of peace. This is evidence of how vast America's propaganda campaign was. They identified five areas as needing priority for propaganda:

1. Explanation of why Americans were fighting.
2. Portray US and their people.
3. Encourage work and production.
4. Boost morale on the home front.
5. Depict the heroics of the Armed forces.

Two of the five areas identified are clearly represented in Food Will Win the War – boosting morale and encouraging work and production. Phillip Taylor believes that the great achievement of American wartime propaganda was its contribution to boosting U.S. and Allied morale.

== Purpose ==
Most propaganda is politicized, an engineering tool for America during the Second World War. David Culbert regarded the propaganda as 'Social Engineering', influencing popular attitudes amongst the masses through media to manufacture social solidarity. This was the purpose of the film, produce an animation that will influence popular attitudes – supporting production for the war effort, and enabling American's to understand that production levels were high enough to avoid starvation at home. Lindley Fraser outlines what he believes are the key principles behind a successful propaganda campaign: "Home propaganda in war time relies upon patriotism, family love, hatred and fear of the enemy, confidence in ultimate victory, and the sense of courage and maybe even adventure."

=== Morale booster ===
The animation is a morale-boosting piece. The depiction in that production was stretched, but Americans maintaining social solidarity and utilising goods was a necessity. The Allies needed Americans to persist with their efforts on the home front. One message 'Hang on, we will win if you pitch in' meant if the American people continued high levels of production, a successful war effort would emerge. Lindley Fraser explains that America succeeded specifically in this, providing the home front with a vigorous and enthusiastic picture of the importance of their war effort. Adolf Hitler was aware of America's mass production and for this reason was anxious about American intervention. Subsequently, he attempted to halt American shipping with German U-Boats. Submarines did cause a decline in American shipping, but this was not influential enough to decrease the effect of American production in the outcome of the war.

=== Importance of agriculture ===
The animation stressed the importance of American agriculture. The title emphasised this point clearly: 'Food will win the War'. Secretary of Agriculture Claude Wickard was most aware of the importance of agriculture, as he explained that America would need to feed a minimum of 10 million Britons. Therefore, it was important for production to continue to grow, as well as exports. Figures show that exports of domestic products quadrupled from 1935 to 1945, demonstrating the continuous growth of output and production. The animation was produced in 1942, the same time in which there were labor shortages - this was also a warning that Americans will have possible hardship and long hours from those unknown to it to in order to maintain required levels of productivity; without adequate farmers the war effort would suffer. Women and children were drafted in to farms to maintain production levels during the labour shortages. The animation depicts farmers as being crucial to the war effort, and its eventual victory.
