= Jean-Claude Michel =

French actor (1925–1999)

Jean-Claude Michel (French pronunciation: [ʒɑ̃ klod miʃɛl]; 1925–1999) was a French actor. Michel was known for being the French voice of Sean Connery and Clint Eastwood in most of their films. He also dubbed Charlton Heston, Rock Hudson, Vittorio Gassman, Leslie Nielsen, Robert Mitchum and many others. In 1960, Heston sent Michel a letter praising his vocal performance in dubbing Heston for Ben-Hur.

== Filmography ==
Year	Title	Role	Notes
1955	Razzia sur la chnouf	Un agent de nettoyage des wagons	Uncredited
1957	Patrouille de choc		
1958	White Cargo	Pierre	
1959	The Giant of Marathon	Phillipides	French version, Voice
1960	Normandie - Niémen	Le commandant Flavier	
1960	Mistress of the World	Ballard	
1961	The Count of Monte Cristo	Fernand de Mortcerf	
1963	The Day and the Hour		
1970	The Mad Heart	Georges	
1970	Trop petit mon ami	Robert Devone	
1971	Chronique d'un couple	Jean-Louis Le Métayer	
1972	La Scoumoune		
1983	Le voleur de feuilles	Un joueur de poker	
1987	Haitian Corner	Jolicoeur	(final film role)
