= Pierre Risch =

French painter

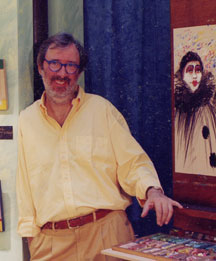
Pierre Risch in 2008.

Pierre Risch, born in 1943 in Paris, is a painter, engraver, lithographer, sculptor, and French designer.

== Formation ==
From 1959 to 1960, he studied at the "École supérieure des Arts Décoratifs" in Strasbourg.

In 1964 he moved to Montmartre where he met one of his Masters Jean-Louis Viard from which he took evening classes at the city of Paris, street Lepic, from 1965 to 1970. The two men will be bond by friendship and respect until the death of Jean-Louis Viard in 2009.

In 1966, he joined a group of painters in Paris to learn all the traditional art of print : the etching, the aquatint, the dry point, and also the lithography and screen printing.

He participated from 1968 to 1970 at different exhibitions in Paris at the Autumn Salon, at Salon des Artistes Français at Salon des Indépendants, Société des Artistes Indépendants.

He won a first prize of young painter in Geneva, Switzerland in 1970.

Pierre Risch has received the title of Chevalier des Arts et des Lettres.

== Techniques ==
Since 1960, Pierre Risch invests himself in technical research and innovation.

He practices the techniques of watercolor and pastel.

He also practices the traditional art of engraving on copper, and lithograph on limestone .

=== Watercolor ===
In the years 60 – 70, watercolor often remains preparatory work of the final oil. So he decides to assert the watercolor's technique as full totally abandoning painting in oil. The artist works in series (girls, chairs, balloons...) Over the years and gallery exhibitions its willingness and determination to bear fruits.

Early 1970s, Pierre Risch develops a technique of watercolor to fully wet the paper sponge and away a product for screen painting, (drawing gum ) to preserve the white of the paper, to keep at the watercolor is essential quality of transparency, subtlety and not to have the often seen bad effect to have put gouache . He paints watercolors very large formats, mainly landscapes, poetic character to return in the best transparencies and lighting. His watercolors are made on site during various trips, (Italy, Greece, Spain, Brittany, Le Crotoy Baie of Somme, Provence...).

"With Risch, seduction comes first, in his art of reproducing transparency, fluidity, and the most subtle, the most refined shades of light he consequently creates an intense emotional appeal.", Emmanuel Robles, writer 1914 – 1995 – member of the Academy Goncourt.

Extract from the catalogue of the exhibition " Pierre Risch, Watercolors : retrospective 1977–1987", and the speech at the opening of the exhibition " A gallery, A painter, 10 years of friendship – retrospective Watercolors 1977 – 1987", Rue de Seine, Gallery Candillier, Paris.

=== Pastel ===
After being practiced by the greatest masters in the eighteenth and nineteenth century, pastel fell into disuse.

In 1970, in collaboration with JM Paillard et Lambertye manufacturers, Pierre Risch working on the development of new shades of dry pastels and new media. With determination the artist organizes a series of didactic and popular exhibitions expressing his love for pastel, he then creates the Pastel Passion and Passion Pastel titles which become over the years his imprint and his official professional mark.

At the same time, Pierre Risch is pending a full subject. He works on the revival of the Carnival of Venice with his Venetian friends. Humanism which then emerges, will become the central theme of his work.

Galleries, collectors and museums, including the Museum Antoine Lecuyer – Maurice Quentin de La Tour in Saint-Quentin, France, support achievements, focusing the Carnivals and especially the Carnival of Venice, from jazz, and dance.

"Pierre Risch has focused mainly on work on paper [...] So by a natural process he came to Pastels, guessing the satisfaction that the technique would give him, and wishing too that with his talent, he would give it back its true worth, or at least its own identity and its unique originality.

...

Pierre Risch's pastel works often highlights the sense of celebration and color, tied to the characters of the Italian Comedy who were subjects of his paintings [...] His style was impressionist in nature, exhibiting visual cues of rain, clouds, mist, or the water sparkling. At other times, he used hatchings, akin to frottage, which were considered to be more free and modern, [...] Pierre Risch also paints movement, poses caught on the spot, and feelings expressed spontaneously by people[...] He becomes the First French painter who works on the theme of Carnivals : Basle, Binche and mostly Venice that he has followed since 1981 and chosen to be the central core of his work as a pastel artist".

Mrs Christine Debrie, Doctor in history of Art – Curator of the Museum Antoine Lecuyer – Maurice Quentin de La Tour in Saint-Quentin, France.

Extract from the catalogue and the opening speech of the exhibition, retrospective Pierre Risch – Pastels – Carnavals de 1981 à 1987.

=== Etching ===
Pierre Risch also practice the traditional technique of etching on copper in the studio Lacourière-Frélaut, in Montmartre, Paris, famous to have worked with Picasso, for making the well-known "suite Ambroise Vollard." Pierre Risch has created there in particular his triptyque Commedia dell' Arte (1981) collected by the Cabinet des estampes de la bibliothèque nationale de France. It mixes the three techniques of etching, aquatint, eau forte and dry point.

=== Lithography ===
The lithographs by Pierre Risch are using the traditional technique on limestones, the artist works on his own hand press "bête a cornes" 1840.

=== Sculpture ===
The sculptures on iron created by Pierre Risch are the continuity and a natural extension of his work on the jazz, dance, body movement, the human being and societal mechanics.

== Solo didactic exhibitions ==
- 1975 Club du Droit and economie, Paris
- 1977 Foundation Paul Ricard, Paris
- 1979 Orangerie du Luxembourg, Senat, Paris
- 1984 Museum of Chateau of Dourdan, France
- 1984 Opening cultural center Boris-Vian, Les Ulis, France
- 1987 Retrospective Pierre Risch, carnivals Pastels 1981–1987
- Museum Antoine Lecuyer – Maurice Quentin de La Tour in Saint-Quentin, France
- 1988 Cultural Center Abou Dhabi, week of France, exhibition and lectures United Arab Emirates
- 1990 French Cultural Center, Oslo, Norway
- 1990 French Cultural Center, Stavanger, Norway
- 1995 Retrospective Orangerie du Luxembourg, Senat, Paris
- 1999 Guest Futuroscope, Poitiers, France
- 2010 Retrospective Risch as life, Zug (city), Switzerland

Since 1968 Pierre Risch has been exhibited in France and abroad, (Brussels, Genève, Abu Dhabi, New York City, Tokyo).

His work is held in public and private collections.

== Bibliography ==
- Emmanuel Benezit, Dictionnaire des peintres, sculpteurs, dessinateurs et graveurs, tome 11, 1976, ISBN 2-7000-3021-4, 1999, ISBN 2-7000-3036-2 & ISBN 2-7000-3051-6
- Carnaval d'Antan et d'Ailleurs – Cent estampes et peintures de la collection Jean Sebille, International museum of Carnival and Mask of Binche, Belgium, Collection Jean Sebille, ISBN 2-87232-005-9
- Cabinet des Estampes de la Bibliothèque nationale de Paris, France, De Bonnard à Baselitz – Dix ans d'enrichissements du Cabinet des Estampes, 1978 to 1988 , ISBN 2-7177-1854-0
- Pierre Risch, Pastels : Carnivals 1981–1987., ed. Antoine Lecuyer – Pierre Risch, 1987.
- Pierre Risch, Aquarelles : retrospective 1977–1987, ed. Pierre Risch, 1987.
- Pierre Risch, Pastel Passion rétrospective 1995, ed. Pierre Risch – Orangerie du Luxembourg, Senat, Paris.
- Pierre Risch, Pierre Risch – Pastel Passion, tome 1 ed. Pierre Risch – Pastel Passion, 2013, ISBN 978-2-9547701-0-9
- Pierre Risch, Pierre Risch – Swingstreet – sculptures, tome 2 ed. Pierre Risch – Swingstreet, 2015, ISBN 978-2-9547701-1-6

== Public collections ==
- Museum Antoine Lecuyer, Saint-Quentin, France
- Museum of Chateau, Dourdan, France
- Cabinet des estampes de la bibliothèque nationale de France
- National Assembly of France, Paris
- Caisse des depots et consignations, Paris
- Prefecture of Evry, France
- Prefecture of Caen Normandy, France
- Regional contemporary art found, FRAC, Basse-Normandie, France
- School les Amonts, les Ulis, France
- District Home of Janvry, France
- Town hall of des Ulis, France
- Town hall of Dourdan, France
- Town hall of Orsay, France
- Bibliothèque of Orsay, France
- Airport of Paris-Orly, France
- French cultural Institute of Oslo, Norway
- Cultural Institute Cheik Zayed of Abou Dhabi, United Arab Emirates
- Maison de la France in New York City, NY, USA
- School of Music, City of Risch-Rotkreuz, Switzerland
