= Aylin Özmenek =

Turkish animator (1942-2021)

- Born: 1942; Istanbul, Turkey
- Died: 2 January 2021 (aged 79); Ankara, Turkey
- Occupation: Animator
- Spouse: Varlık Özmenek

Ayşe Aylin Özmenek (1942 – 2 January 2021) was a Turkish animator.

== Biography ==
Born in Istanbul in 1942, Özmenek graduated from the İzmir University of Economics. She began working for the Turkish Radio and Television Corporation in 1969 and lent her voice to radio programs such as Gençlere, Beyaz Perde'den, Ses Ustaları, and Yeni Plaklar Yeni Yorumlar.

Aylin Özmenek was married to Varlık Özmenek, who died in August 2020. She contracted COVID-19 during the COVID-19 pandemic in Turkey and died in Ankara on 2 January 2021, at the age of 79. She was buried at Karşıyaka Cemetery two days later.
