= The Missing Link (1980 film) =

1984 film directed by Picha

- Theatrical release poster
- Directed by: Picha
- Written by: Picha and Tony Hendra (Original English version); Christian Dura (French version)
- Screenplay by: Picha; Jean Colette; Pierre Bartier; Christian Dura; Michel Gast
- Produced by: Picha; Michel Gast; Jenny Gérard
- Starring: Ron Venable; Bob Kaliban; John Graham; Christopher Guest; Clark Warren; Mark E. Smith; Bill Murray
- Edited by: Doug Turner; Lucien Yvonnet; Bob Jones
- Music by: Roy Budd and Paul Fishman (original score); Leo Sayer, Alex Master, Les Davidson, and Billy Livsey (songs)
- Production companies: Pils Film (Belgium); S.N.D. (France)
- Distributed by: SND Oceanic (France); Elan Films (Belgium)
- Release date: 21 May 1980; (France)
- Running time: 95 minutes (uncut); 83 minutes (cut)
- Countries: Belgium; France
- Languages: English (original); French (dubbed)

The Missing Link (French: Le Chaînon manquant) is a 1980 adult animated comedy film directed by Picha, and co-produced by Pils Film (Belgium) and S.N.D. (France). The film was entered into the 1980 Cannes Film Festival, but lost out to All That Jazz and Kagemusha.

== Plot ==
The year is 196303 BC. A group of cavemen rises from the mud, and the first thing on their minds is finding something to eat. After two unsuccessful attempts, the group decides to eat one of their own. Suddenly, the men meet women, but do not know how to make love to them. The elder of the men sees a pair of stegosaurus performing doggy style, which inspires the elder to do the same thing with one of the women. Nine months later, that same woman is pregnant with two boys, Ah and O. The cavemen like Ah, but are frightened by O and abandon him. Meanwhile, a brontosaurus abandons one of her eggs. Both O and the baby brontosaurus Igua meet, and instantly become friends.

Years later, while trying to feed O, Igua comes across a stranded egg. Before O can try to eat it, the egg hatches and inside it is a baby pterodactyl named Croak. Croak and O become friends as well, but Igua becomes jealous and does not want O to see Croak again. As O grows up into an adult, he meets up with Croak again, who tries to help O become smarter. Their first "lesson" is how to fly. As O tries to fly, Igua steps in and takes O away. The next day, O looks in a pool of water and sees his reflection and discovers that he is a man, not a brontosaurus. He decides to leave Igua and search for his own kind. As O sets out into the jungle, he runs into several creatures that he mistakes for men, including a wild boar and a giant worm. At nightfall, O becomes lost in the jungle and has an encounter with a menagerie of unusual creatures that nearly kill him. However, he soon finds Croak and the two fly away together. While flying, Croak accidentally crashes into a dimorphodon and drops O, thus separating the two.

Elsewhere, Igua tries to get together with his own kind. He finds a group of brontosauruses at a nearby lake, but they reject him due to Igua smelling too much like "man". Igua is crushed and decides to find O. As O begins to search for man, he comes across a group of workaholic creatures named "No-Lobes". They let him stay, but O causes chaos, which results in O discovering the wheel. After O destroys the No-Lobes's crops with the wheel, he is kicked out and the quest for man continues. While exploring, O is caught by a feline creature with a long tail, which she uses to seduce her victims before eating them. O decides to name her "No-man". "No-man" uses her tail to seduce O, then drags him off to her own kind. Before the felines eat him, they are distracted by a new-born baby. O and "No-man", who has a change of heart, run off together, with the others quickly behind them. O and "No-man" give them the slip, then they both have sex. While the two sleep, they are interrupted by a stampede of giant turtles. The feline tribe catches up with them, and catches "No-man". O uses a lone giant turtle shell and a couple of wheels to ride up to the tribe and tries to catch "No-man", but misses. O rolls off into the desert, leaving "No-man" to have her tail cut off. O crashes into a palm tree in the middle of the desert and is left to walk again.

Later, O runs into Croak again. O is in need of water, and Croak just happens to be searching for water. They find what appears to be water, but before O can drink, he is stopped by a dragon. The dragon tries to breathe fire at O, but it comes out his anus instead. To get water, O decides to help the dragon by sticking a cork up the dragon's anus. This causes the dragon to breathe fire from his mouth. The dragon thanks O and lets him drink. However, the watering hole is in fact a tar pit, but the dragon gives him a lift to a nearby lake. After O drinks plenty of water, he takes a brief nap. When he wakes up, he sees that he is tied down to the ground by a colony of ants. O gets himself free and climbs up a tall building made out of grass, which cracks and sends O crashing into a pool of water, which drowns half of the ants. O continues on to the Arctic, and meets up with a group of Norwegian barbarians. O shows them fire, which intrigues the group. They use their fur coats to light up the fire even more, but the fire melts the ice and their coats are lost in the bottom of the ocean. The group chases after O, but Croak flies in and saves him. As Croak flies O to safety, O is eaten by a shark. O eventually escapes from the shark and finally meets his human family.

The elder recognizes O and instantly dies. O takes over as leader and tells them that he'll teach man what he has learned on his travels. While teaching them, Igua finally catches up with O. However, O is still angry at Igua. Meanwhile, Ah (O's brother, though neither of them know that they are related) takes over as leader and shoves O away into the fire that was made by Ah. Igua saves him, and both O and Igua reconcile their friendship. Ah (in caveman talk) tells his people that they must show the world who is boss. They set out reshaping the Earth in their own image and destroy any creature standing in their way. As a result, the dragon disappears from the face of the Earth, the No-Lobes are all exterminated in a war against Ah, the dinosaurs drive themselves to extinction by committing mass suicide, the feline clan is slaughtered and used for clothing and jewelry (save for No-Man, who later dumps O), and the ant colony attempts to escape via a rocket made of grass, which ends up crashing back down and killing them all, as well as causing Pangaea to split into the Earth's continents. O, Croak and Igua escape the devastation and soon find a deserted island where they spend the rest of their lives, with O taking upon the title of the missing link and contemplating the severity of his actions.

== Cast ==
Character	English	*French
O	Ron Venable	Richard Darbois
Igua	John Graham	Georges Aminel
Croak	Bob Kaliban	Roger Carel
No-Lobes	Christopher Guest; Clark Warren; Bob Kaliban	Jacques Ferrière; William Sabatier; Georges Aminel; Roger Carel
Dragon	Bill Murray	Philippe Nicaud
Narrator	Mark E. Smith	Jacques Dacqmine
Additional voices	Roger Carel, Arlette Thomas, Bob Kaliban, and John Graham	Roger Carel, Arlette Thomas, Philippe Nicaud, Marc de Georgi, Georges Aminel, Monique Thierry, and William Sabatier

*Recorded after the English version in Paris

== Production ==
=== Development ===
Because of the remarkable success of the 1975 film, Tarzoon, la honte de la jungle, Picha was encouraged to address another subject, that of Darwin and his theory of evolution. More ambitious than the previous film, production lasted from 1977 to 1979. Animation took place in Belgium, New York City, France, and London.

=== Featured species ===
- Brontosaurus
- Triceratops
- Stegosaurus
- Ankylosaurus (one pursued O and later killed)
- Edmontosaurus
- Pachycephalosaurus
- Iguanodon
- Tyrannosaurus rex (one killed by Ah)
- Woolly Mammoth
- Smilodon
- Pteranodon
- Dimetrodon
- Colossochelys atlas (the giant turtles)
- Gorilla (the side character El Gorilla was one)
- Dimorphodon
- Rat
- Dragon
- Feline humanoids- a race of inherently female cat-like creatures that seduce their victims before killing them.
- No-Lobes- gelatinous, dim-witted, sub-human creatures that spend all of their time working and growing crops.
- Ant
- Cavemen
- Human
- Megalodon

== Home media ==
In 1984, the film received its initial video release in Australia by Filmways and Video Classics using the 83-minute cut print. The same print was later used for the 1995 Force Video re-release. In 2004, Force Video released the film on DVD using a VHS rip from either the Filmways/Video Classics or the Force video release., France released the film on VHS in 1982 under Supervideo production and later on Fil A Film with 83 cut print. In 1989 a Japanese VHS was released with its English audio and possibly the 95-minute cut print. On 28 July 1999, A Region 2 PAL DVD was released in France (albeit in an SD format, and with its cut version). It includes the French and English dub, the French theatrical trailer, a complete filmography of the director, and 2 reviews of the film. The film was then released again on DVD in Germany (with its original uncut version) in the year 2009. The film would also be released on DVD in the Benelux and the Nordic Countries in 2011-2012 (cutting some scenes from the Australian cut print and replacing those scenes with scene that weren't in the Australian nor later French print)

== In other media ==
=== Comics ===
Picha also adapted the film into a comic strip.

== B.C. Rock ==
B.C. Rock
- Written by: Jim Vallely; Jonathan Schmock; Joseph Plewa; Christine Neubaur
- Produced by: Albert Schawrtz; Michael S. Landes
- Starring: Jim Vallely; Jonathan Schmock; Joseph Plewa
- Music by: Alan Brewer; Anna Pepper
- Distributed by: Almi Pictures
- Release date: 16 November 1984
- Running time: 90 minutes
- Country: United States
- Language: English

In 1984, an American dub was released known as B.C. Rock. It was released in select theaters and home video by Almi Pictures. Major changes to the film included newly written dialogue by the comedy duo The Funny Boys (Vallely and Schmock), recut footage, different voices, different instrumental score, the absence of the narrator (with the main character telling the story), and nearly all the songs written and performed by Leo Sayer have been replaced by songs by other artists. Though several bootleg DVDs are available online, there are currently no plans for an official DVD release. Bob Weinstein and Harvey Weinstein, future founders of The Weinstein Company, are billed as "Music Talent Consultants". Relative newcomer Miramax Films received a "Special Thanks" billing.

Cast

- Jim Vallely as Stewie Babcock/Ah
- Jonathan Schmock as Slick
- Joseph Plewa as Bone
- Christopher Guest, Clark Warren and Bob Kaliban as No-Lobes
- Bill Murray as Dragon

Additional Voices

- Jim Vallely
- Jonathan Schmock

=== Song Performers ===
- Alan Brewer - "Where I Belong"
- Anna Pepper - "Friends"
- Clarence Clemons - "Feline Blues"
- Genesis - "Afterglow" *
- Hall & Oates - "Alley Katz" *
- Leo Sayer - "Eating" * / "Taking the Brakes Off" * / "Shake the Hand" * / "It Hurts Every Time But We Love It" *
- Rick Derringer - "Afraid of the Night" (duet with Brewer)
- Rick Wakeman - "Flyin'" * (duet with Pepper) / "Steamhole Dance" * / "War Mongers" *
- Kevin Kelley - "Ant Battle"
- Steel Breeze - "This Time 'Round" / "Step By Step"
- Triumph - "Empty Inside" *

A soundtrack for this version has never been released, possibly due to legal issues. However, some of the songs (marked *) have been released officially.

== Soundtrack ==
The Missing Link: Music From The Motion Picture

Soundtrack album by Leo Sayer
- Released: 1980
- Genres: Rock, Soundtrack
- Label: Chrysalis Records

A soundtrack of the United Kingdom version was released in 1980. The songs were performed by Leo Sayer and were written by Sayer, Alex Master, Les Davidson, and Billy Livsey. Sayer and Davidson also wrote Igua's theme. The score was composed by Roy Budd and performed by the National Philharmonic Orchestra. Additional music was provided by Absolute Elsewhere member Paul Fishmann.

=== Track listing ===
1. "Shake the Hand"
2. "It Hurts Every Time But We Love It"
3. "The Missing Link Theme" (score)
4. "Paradise" (score)
5. "The Only Way to Travel"
6. "The Croak" (score)
7. "You Can't Make an Omelette Without Eggs"
8. "Creation" (score)
9. "Eating"
10. "The Mouth" (score)
11. "Takin' The Brakes Off"
12. "Stand On Your Own Feet"
13. "Ant City" (score)
14. "The Missing Link"
15. "The March of Man"

== See also ==
- List of animated feature-length films
- List of films featuring dinosaurs
