= Picha =

Belgian cartoonist, film director

- Born: Jean-Paul Walravens; Brussels, Belgium
- Occupations: cartoonist, film director
- Known for: Tarzoon: Shame of the Jungle, The Missing Link, The Big Bang, Snow White: The Sequel

Jean-Paul "Picha" Walravens (Brussels, Belgium) is a Belgian cartoonist, comics artist, animator and film director. He is most famous for his adult animated films, such as Tarzoon: Shame of the Jungle.

== Biography ==
Jean-Paul Walravens, quickly fascinated by drawing, studied at the Institute of Fine Arts Saint-Luc. In 1960, he contributed his work as a caricaturist and cartoonist for many newspapers and magazines around the world including National Lampoon and The New York Times. During this period, he adopted the pseudonym Picha. A passion for drawing led Picha to the world of comics. He is the author of several books, such as Picha at Club Med (1971) and Persona non grata (1975).

After this period, he went on to work in animation. In 1975, he conceived, co-wrote and co-directed the film Tarzoon: Shame of the Jungle, a raunchy parody of the Tarzan stories by Edgar Rice Burroughs. The original English version, which was produced alongside the French version, was written by National Lampoon writers Anne Beatts and Michael O'Donoghue and featured the voices of comedians then known only for their work on The National Lampoon Radio Hour, including Christopher Guest, Brian Doyle-Murray, Bill Murray and John Belushi as his Radio Hour character Guru Craig Baker, the Perfect Master. The film was a huge success in its home country Belgium and in France, but ran through troubles with the Edgar Rice Burroughs Estate when the estate sued the creators of the film for plagiarism. The estate lost the case when the creators stated that the film was a parody. However, when the film was released in the U.S., the estate demanded that the film title and main character "Tarzoon" be changed due to the film's nature degrading the Tarzan name. In 1979, the now R-rated film was released under the title Shame Of The Jungle, and was a critical and financial flop.

Picha's next film was the 1980 film The Missing Link. Though it wasn't as successful as Tarzoon, the film was entered into the 1980 Cannes Film Festival. Picha also adapted the film into a comic book. In 1984, the film was released into the U.S. under the title B.C. Rock. Major changes to the film included newly written dialogue by the comedy duo The Funny Boys (Jim Vallely and Jonathan Schmock), recut footage, different voices, different instrumental score, the absence of the narrator (with the main character telling the story), and nearly all the songs written and performed by Leo Sayer have been replaced by songs by other artists (including Steel Breeze, Hall & Oates, and Rick Wakeman) in order to attract a wider audience. Unfortunately, the film was poorly promoted on video and faded into obscurity. However, this version manages to have a cult following to this day. Picha's future work would never be released in American theaters or any home video format.

Picha's next film was 1987's The Big Bang, which was also adapted into a comic book. After the small success of the film, Picha left the movie industry to concentrate on writing for television. Picha's television works included Zoo Olympics (1990–1991), Zoo Cup (1992–1993), and Buddy Buddy... A Dog's life (1995). In 2007, Picha made a comeback with Snow White: The Sequel, a parody of fairy tales, which most animated films were doing at the time.

== Filmography ==
=== Films ===
- Cartoon Circus (1972)
- Tarzoon, la honte de la jungle (Tarzoon: Shame of the Jungle) (1975, directed with Boris Szulzinger)
- Le Chainon manquant (The Missing Link) (1980)
- Le Big-Bang (The Big Bang) (1987)
- Blanche-Neige, la suite (Snow White: The Sequel) (2007)

=== Television series ===
- Zoo Olympics (1992)
- Zoo Cup (1994)
- Buddy Buddy... A Dog's Life (originally titled Les Jules, chienne de vie.. in French) (1997)
