= Golden Calf for Best Leading Role =

Dutch film award

The following is a list of winners of the Golden Calf for best actor/actress at the Nederlands Film Festival. From 2021 onwards the award became a gender-neutral award.

== Best Actor (1981–2020) ==
- 1981 - Rutger Hauer - All his works
- 1982 - Rijk de Gooyer - All his works
- 1983 - Vic Moeremans as farmer Vermeulen - De Vlasschaard
- 1984 - Gerard Thoolen as Ben Martens and the father - De Mannetjesmaker and De Illusionist
- 1985 - Peter Tuinman as Wiebren Hogerhuis - De Dream
- 1986 - John Kraaykamp as Cor Takes - De Aanslag
- 1987 - Willem Nijholt as Havinck - Havinck
- 1988 - Michiel Romeijn as Harrie de Bruijn - Van Geluk Gesproken
- 1989 - Pierre Bokma as Nico - Leedvermaak
- 1990 - Thom Hoffman as Frits van Egters - De Avonden
- 1991 - Porgy Franssen as Paul - Bij Nader Inzien
- 1992 - Rudolf Lucieer as the hunter - De Noorderlingen
- 1993 - Rik Launspach as Erik ter Brug - Oeroeg
- 1994 - Jaap Spijkers as Harry - 1000 Rozen
- 1995 - Rijk de Gooyer as Willem 'Uli' Bouwmeester - Hoogste Tijd
- 1996 - Peer Mascini as Pom - Blind Date
- 1997 - Jaap van Donselaar as Theo van Hoesel - De Tranen Van Castro
- 1998 - Johan Leysen as Felice Beato - Felice...Felice...
- 1999 - Rijk de Gooyer as Grandfather - Scratches in the Table
- 2000 - Victor Löw as Jack - Lek
- 2001 - Fedja van Huêt as Alex/Aram - AmnesiA
- 2002 - Jacob Derwig as Nino - Zus & Zo
- 2003 - Tygo Gernandt as Maikel Verheije - Van God Los
- 2004 - Cees Geel as Simon Cohen - Simon
- 2005 - Thijs Römer as Jim de Booy - 06/05
- 2006 - Frank Lammers as Dennis van der Horst - Nachtrit
- 2007 - Marcel Hensema as Koos van Dijk - Wild Romance
- 2008 - Robert de Hoog as Frankie - Skin
- 2009 - Martijn Lakemeier as Michiel van Beusekom - Oorlogswinter
- 2010 - Barry Atsma as Stijn - Stricken
- 2011 - Nasrdin Dchar as Nadir - Rabat
- 2012 - Reinout Scholten van Aschat as Rem Hubrechts - The Heineken Kidnapping
- 2013 - Marwan Kenzari as Majid - Wolf
- 2014 - Gijs Naber as Thijs - How To Avoid Everything
- 2015 - Martijn Fischer as André Hazes - Bloed, zweet & tranen
- 2016 - Isaka Sawadogo as Yaya - The Paradise Suite
- 2017 - Peter Paul Muller as Bram Fischer - Bram Fischer
- 2018 - Jacob Derwig as Gijs van Hall - The Resistance Banker
- 2019 - Marcel Musters as Thomas - God Only Knows
- 2020 - Shahine El-Hamus as Samir - The Promise of Pisa

== Best Actress (1981–2020) ==
- 1981 - Marja Kok as Aaltje Botter - Het Teken Van Het Beest
- 1983 - Carolien van de Berg - Vroeger Kon Je Lachen
- 1984 - Monique van de Ven as Anna - all her works/De Schorpioen
- 1985 - Renée Soutendijk as Trudi - all her works/De IJssalon
- 1986 - Geert de Jong as Danny Gisberts - Mama Is Boos
- 1987 - Jasperina de Jong as Inez - Vroeger Is Dood
- 1988 - Marijke Veugelers as Eva and Karin de Bruijn - Ei/Van Geluk Gesproken
- 1989 - Annet Nieuwenhuijzen as Riet - Leedvermaak
- 1990 - Monique van de Ven as Anne Herden - Romeo
- 1991 - Loes Wouterson as Henriette - Bij Nader Inzien
- 1992 - Janneque Draisma as Stephanie - Kyodai Makes the Big Time
- 1993 - Els Dottermans as Monita - Beck, De Gesloten Kamer
- 1994 - Marieke Heebink as Gina - 1000 Rozen
- 1995 - Willeke van Ammelrooy as Antonia - Antonia
- 1996 - Renée Fokker as Katja - Blind Date
- 1997 - Maartje Nevejan, Adelheid Roosen, Marnie Blok, Leonoor Pauw, Lieneke le Roux as Leen, Carlos, Ted, Muis and Lian - Broos
- 1998 - Monic Hendrickx as Anna Krzyzanowska - De Poolse Bruid
- 1999 - Nadja Hüpscher as Noor - De Boekverfilming
- 2000 - Willeke van Ammelrooy as Madam Lauwereyssen - Lijmen/Het Been
- 2001 - Monic Hendrickx as Nienke van Hichtum - Nynke
- 2002 - Carice van Houten as Minoes - Minoes
- 2003 - Kim van Kooten as Phileine - Phileine Zegt Sorry
- 2004 - Monic Hendrickx as Martje Portegies - Het Zuiden
- 2005 - Maria Kraakman as Anna - Guernsey
- 2006 - Carice van Houten as Rachel Stein/Ellis de Vries - Zwartboek
- 2007 - Elsie de Brauw as Roos - Tussenstand
- 2008 - Anneke Blok as Anne - Tiramisu
- 2009 - Rifka Lodeizen as Marieke - Can Go Through Skin
- 2010 - Carice van Houten as Lea - De gelukkige huisvrouw
- 2011 - Carice van Houten as Ingrid Jonker - Black Butterflies
- 2012 - Hannah Hoekstra as Hemel - Hemel
- 2013 - Hadewych Minis as Marina - Borgman
- 2014 - Abbey Hoes as Nena - Nena
- 2015 - Georgina Verbaan as Anne de Koning - The Surprise
- 2016 - Hannah Hoekstra as Tiny - The Fury
- 2017 - Nora El Koussour as Layla - Layla M.
- 2018 - Maria Kraakman as Lin - In Blue
- 2019 - Melody Klaver as Kimmy- Rafaël
- 2020 - Beppie Melissen as Stine Rasmussen - Romy's Salon

== Best Leading Role (Since 2021) ==
- 2021 - Fedja van Huêt as Bas Haan in The Judgement
- 2022 - Thekla Reuten as Merel in Narcosis
- 2023 - Renée Soutendijk as Agathe in Sweet Dreams
- 2024 - Leny Breederveld as Maartje Vermeiden in Memory Land
- 2025 - Thekla Reuten as Anouk in Our Girls
- 2026 - Daan Buringa as Fransje Hermans in Joe Speedboat

== Sources ==
- Golden Calf Awards (Dutch)
- NFF Website
