= List of Dutch submissions for the Academy Award for Best International Feature Film =

Best International Feature Film submissions from the Netherlands

Highlights
- Debut: 1959
- Submissions: 59
- Nominations: 7
- Oscar winners: 3

The Netherlands has submitted films for the Academy Award for Best International Feature Film (Note: The category was previously named the Academy Award for Best Foreign Language Film, but this was changed to the Academy Award for Best International Feature Film in April 2019, after the Academy deemed the word "Foreign" to be outdated.) since 1959. The award is handed out annually by the United States Academy of Motion Picture Arts and Sciences to a feature-length motion picture produced outside the United States that contains primarily non-English dialogue. The award was created for the 1956 Academy Awards, succeeding the non-competitive Honorary Academy Awards which were presented between 1947 and 1955 to the best foreign language films released in the United States.

As of 2026, the Netherlands has won three times, for: The Assault (1987), Antonia's Line (1996), and Character (1998).

== Submissions ==
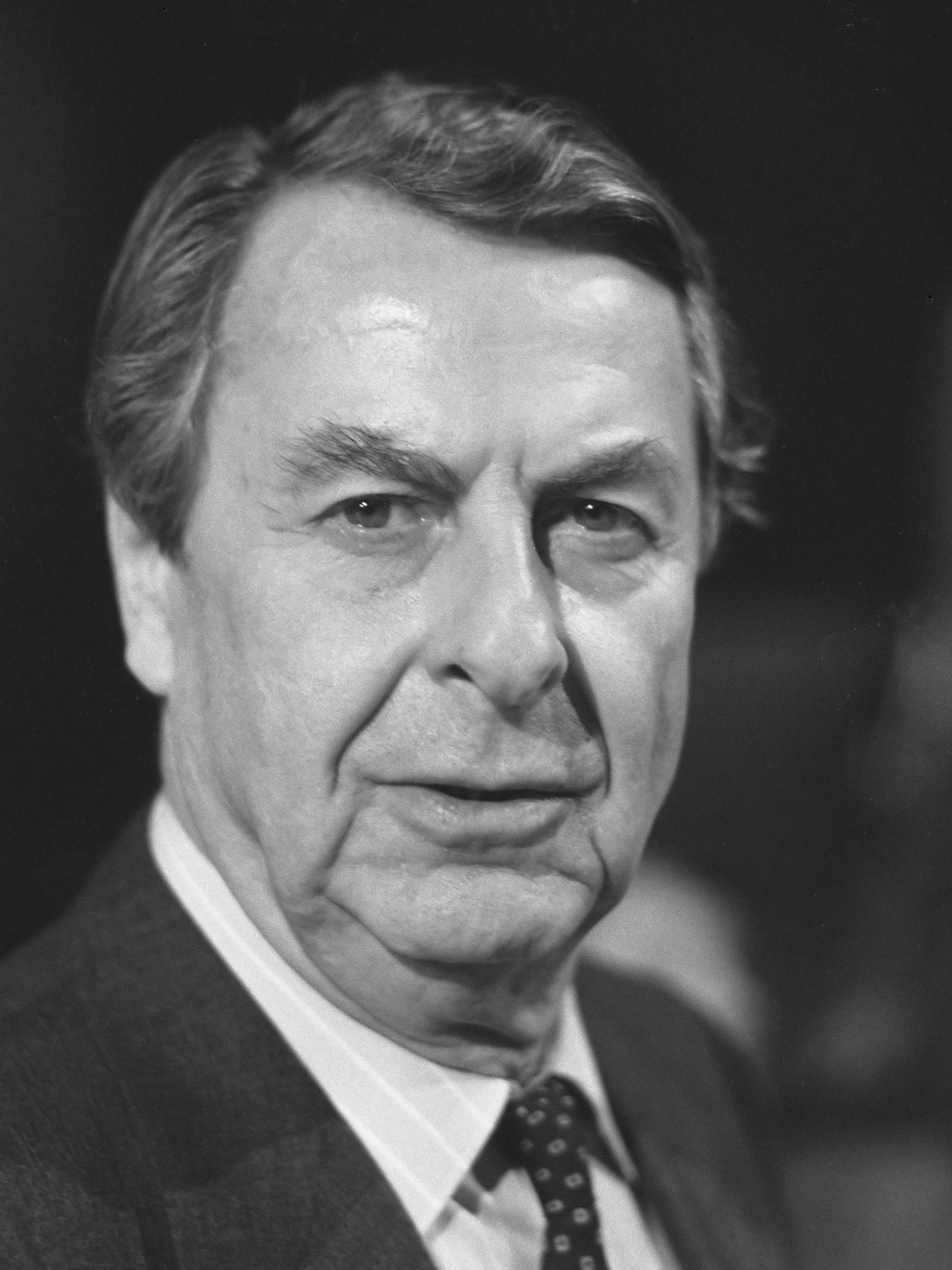
Fons Rademakers was the first Dutch director to win the award, for The Assault in 1987.

The Academy of Motion Picture Arts and Sciences has invited the film industries of various countries to submit their best film for the Academy Award for Best International Feature Film since 1956. The International Feature Film Committee oversees the process and reviews all the submitted films. Following this, they vote via secret ballot to determine the five nominees for the award. Before the award was created, the Board of Governors of the academy voted on a film every year that was considered the best foreign language film released in the United States, and there were no submissions.

Two Dutch submissions were disqualified: The Vanishing (1989), because more than half of the film was spoken in French, and Bluebird (2006), because it had aired on television.

Fons Rademakers represented the Netherlands in the competition five times, achieving two nominations, including one win.

Most of the films are primary in Dutch. Below is a list of the films that have been submitted by the Netherlands for review by the academy for the award since its first entry in 1959.

Year (Ceremony)	Film title used in nomination	Original title	Language(s)	Director(s)	Result
1959 (32nd)	The Village on the River	Dorp aan de rivier	Dutch	Fons Rademakers	Nominated
1963 (36th)	Like Two Drops of Water	Als twee druppels water	Dutch	Fons Rademakers	Not nominated
1964 (37th)	The Human Dutch	Alleman	Dutch	Bert Haanstra	Not nominated
1969 (42nd)	Monsieur Hawarden	Monsieur Hawarden	Dutch	Harry Kümel	Not nominated
1971 (44th)	Mira		Dutch	Fons Rademakers	Not nominated
1973 (46th)	Turkish Delight	Turks Fruit	Dutch	Paul Verhoeven	Nominated
1974 (47th)	Help! The Doctor Is Drowning	Help, de dokter verzuipt!	Dutch	Nikolai van der Heyde	Not nominated
1975 (48th)	Dr. Pulder Sows Poppies	Dokter Pulder zaait papavers	Dutch	Bert Haanstra	Not nominated
1976 (49th)	Max Havelaar		Dutch, Indonesian	Fons Rademakers	Not nominated
1977 (50th)	Soldier of Orange	Soldaat van Oranje	Dutch, German, English	Paul Verhoeven	Not nominated
1978 (51st)	Pastorale 1943		Dutch, German	Wim Verstappen	Not nominated
1979 (52nd)	A Woman Like Eve	Een Vrouw als Eva	Dutch, English	Nouchka van Brakel	Not nominated
1980 (53rd)	In for Treatment	Opname	Dutch	Marja Kok & Erik van Zuylen	Not nominated
1981 (54th)	Come-Back!		Dutch	Jonne Severijn	Not nominated
1982 (55th)	The Cool Lakes of Death	Van de koele meren des doods	Dutch, English, French	Nouchka van Brakel	Not nominated
1983 (56th)	The Fourth Man	De vierde man	Dutch	Paul Verhoeven	Not nominated
1984 (57th)	Army Brats	Schatjes!	Dutch	Ruud van Hemert	Not nominated
1985 (58th)	The Dream	De Dream	West Frisian	Pieter Verhoeff	Not nominated
1986 (59th)	The Assault	De Aanslag	Dutch, German, English	Fons Rademakers	Won Academy Award
1987 (60th)	Count Your Blessings	Van geluk gesproken	Dutch	Pieter Verhoeff	Not nominated
1988 (61st)	The Vanishing	Spoorloos	Dutch, French	George Sluizer	Disqualified^{[A]}
1989 (62nd)	Polonaise	Leedvermaak	Dutch	Frans Weisz	Not nominated
1990 (63rd)	Evenings	De Avonden	Dutch	Rudolf van den Berg	Not nominated
1991 (64th)	Eline Vere	Eline Vere	Dutch, French, English	Harry Kümel	Not nominated
1992 (65th)	The Northerners	De Noorderlingen	Dutch	Alex van Warmerdam	Not nominated
1993 (66th)	The Little Blonde Death	De Kleine Blonde Dood	Dutch	Jean van de Velde	Not nominated
1994 (67th)	06		Dutch	Theo van Gogh	Not nominated
1995 (68th)	Antonia's Line	Antonia	Dutch	Marleen Gorris	Won Academy Award
1996 (69th)	Long Live the Queen	Lang leve de koningin	Dutch	Esmé Lammers	Not nominated
1997 (70th)	Character	Karakter	Dutch	Mike van Diem	Won Academy Award
1998 (71st)	The Polish Bride	De Poolse bruid	Dutch, Polish	Karim Traidia	Not nominated
1999 (72nd)	Scratches in the Table	Madelief: Krassen in het tafelblad	Dutch	Ineke Houtman	Not nominated
2000 (73rd)	Little Crumb	Kruimeltje	Dutch	Maria Peters	Not nominated
2001 (74th)	The Moving True Story of a Woman Ahead of Her Time	Nynke	Dutch, West Frisian	Pieter Verhoeff	Not nominated
2002 (75th)	Zus & Zo		Dutch	Paula van der Oest	Nominated
2003 (76th)	Twin Sisters	De Tweeling	Dutch, German	Ben Sombogaart	Nominated
2004 (77th)	Simon		Dutch	Eddy Terstall	Not nominated
2005 (78th)	Bluebird		Dutch	Mijke de Jong	Disqualified^{[B]}
2006 (79th)	Black Book	Zwartboek	Dutch, German, English	Paul Verhoeven	Made shortlist
2007 (80th)	Duska		Dutch, Russian	Jos Stelling	Not nominated
2008 (81st)	Dunya & Desie		Dutch, Arabic	Dana Nechushtan	Not nominated
2009 (82nd)	Winter in Wartime ^{[C]}	Oorlogswinter	Dutch, German, English	Martin Koolhoven	Made shortlist
2010 (83rd)	Tirza		Dutch	Rudolf van den Berg	Not nominated
2011 (84th)	Sonny Boy		Dutch	Maria Peters	Not nominated
2012 (85th)	Kauwboy		Dutch	Boudewijn Koole	Not nominated
2013 (86th)	Borgman		Dutch	Alex van Warmerdam	Not nominated
2014 (87th)	Accused	Lucia de B.	Dutch	Paula van der Oest	Made shortlist
2015 (88th)	The Paradise Suite		Bulgarian, Swedish, French, Bosnian, Serbian, Dutch	Joost van Ginkel	Not nominated
2016 (89th)	Tonio		Dutch	Paula van der Oest	Not nominated
2017 (90th)	Layla M.		Dutch	Mijke de Jong	Not nominated
2018 (91st)	The Resistance Banker	Bankier van het Verzet	Dutch	Joram Lürsen	Not nominated
2019 (92nd)	Instinct		Dutch	Halina Reijn	Not nominated
2020 (93rd)	Buladó		Papiamento	Éche Janga	Not nominated
2021 (94th)	Do Not Hesitate		Dutch, English, Arabic	Shariff Korver	Not nominated
2022 (95th)	Narcosis		Dutch	Martijn de Jong	Not nominated
2023 (96th)	Sweet Dreams		Dutch	Ena Sendijarević	Not nominated
2024 (97th)	Memory Lane	De Terugreis	Dutch	Jelle de Jonge	Not nominated
2025 (98th)	Reedland	Rietland	Dutch	Sven Bresser	Not nominated
2026 (99th)	Paikar	پیکار	Persian, Dari, Dutch	Dawood Hilmandi	Pending

== Shortlisted Films ==
Year	Film
2015	12 Months in 1 Day · Alice Cares · The Amazing Wiplala · Around the World in 50 Concerts · Between the Devil and the Deep · Blood, Sweat & Tears · Clean Hands · Don't Lose Heart · The Escape · Frailer · Homies · How to Avoid Everything · In the Heart · The Intruder · Michiel de Ruyter · Prince · Schneider vs. Bax · Sergio Herman: Fucking Perfect · Silent Fear · The Sky Above Us · Son of Mine · The Surprise · Those Who Feel the Fire Burning · Ventoux · The Wolf's Game · Zurich
2016	Adios Amigos · The Fury · De Held · Hieronymus Bosch, Touched by the Devil · History's Future · In My Father's Garden · J. Kessels · Meester Kikker · Public Works · A Real Vermeer
2017	Brothers · The Day My Father Became a Bush · Disappearance · In Blue · De Matthäus missie van Reinbert de Leeuw · Quality Time · Tulipani, Love, Honour and a Bicycle
2018	Brothers · Catacombe · Cobain · Craving · Life Is Wonderful · Messi and Maud · Rafaël · Redbad
2019	About That Life · Bloody Marie · Kabul, City in the Wind · Fight Girl · My Extraordinary Summer with Tess · Open Seas · Romy's Salon · Sheep Hero · Take Me Somewhere Nice
2020	Hidden in the Spotlight · Last Days of Spring · The Marriage Escape · My Best Friend Anne Frank · My Life · My Rembrandt · Paradise Drifters · The Promise of Pisa · Stop Filming Us · They Call Me Babu · The Warden · Wei
2021	10 Songs for Charity · Anne+ · The East · The Expedition of the Family Fox · The Forgotten Battle · I Don't Wanna Dance · The Judgement · A Man and a Camera · Meskina · My Best Friend Anne Frank · Mitra · Shadow Game · Silence of the Tides
2022	Along the Way · Bigman · El Houb · The Last Ride of the Wolves · Met Mes · Pink Moon · Sea of Time · Shabu · Totem · Turn Your Body to the Sun
2023	All Inclusive · Broken · Faithfully Yours · Inside My Heart · Kiddo · Line of Fire · Lost Transport · The Man from Rome · Mascot · Summer Brother · That Afternoon · Under the Naked Sky · Under Water · When We Lost to the Germans
2024	Fox and Hare Save the Forest · Gerlach · Hardcore Never Dies · Last Call · Lost City · Milk · White Flash
2025	Alpha. · Fabula · Live for Me · Our Girls · The Propagandist · The System · Three Days of Fish
2026	Ellie the Elephant · A Family · Honestly, I'm Fine · House of Hope · Our Girls

== See also ==
- List of Academy Award winners and nominees for Best International Feature Film
- List of Academy Award-winning foreign language films
- Cinema of the Netherlands
- Golden Calf for Best Feature Film

== Notes ==
A: The Vanishing was disqualified because the Academy determined that there was too much French dialogue in the film to meet the requirements. Although the film was produced in the Netherlands by French-Dutch filmmaker and a mostly Dutch cast, AMPAS deemed that the film was unsuitable to represent the Netherlands. The Dutch declined to send another film, leaving them unrepresented for the first time since 1972.
B: Bluebird was rejected by the Academy because the film previously aired on Dutch television. The Academy was not persuaded by the fact that the film had been newly edited for cinema since the broadcasting, stating "there was not enough difference between the two versions." Because of the late notification the Netherlands was unable to submit a new entry.
C: The Dutch selection committee originally announced The Silent Army, by Jean van de Velde as their official Oscar submission. Several people within the Dutch film industry protested that the film was not eligible since it contained too much English dialogue and because it had screened in Dutch theatres in an alternate version, in violation of AMPAS rules. The committee withdrew the submission and agreed to reconvene. They then chose The Silent Army a second time. After conferring with AMPAS and being told that the film was, in fact, going to be disqualified, they met a third time and selected Winter in Wartime.
