= Golden Calf for Best Feature Film =

Dutch film award

The following is a list of winners of the Golden Calf for best long feature film at the NFF.

| Year | Film | Original title | Language | Recipients |
|---|---|---|---|---|
| 1981 | The Mark of the Beast | Het teken van het beest | Dutch | Pieter Verhoeff |
| 1982 | A Question of Silence | De stilte rond Christine M. | Dutch | Marleen Gorris |
| 1983 | Hans, Life Before Death | Hans: Het leven voor de dood | Dutch | Louis van Gasteren |
| 1984 | The Illusionist | De illusionist | None | Jos Stelling |
| 1985 | Flesh and Blood | Flesh+Blood | English | Gijs Versluys |
| 1986 | Abel | Abel | Dutch | Laurens Geels & Dick Maas |
| 1987 | Bygones | Vroeger is dood | Dutch | Jos van der Linden |
| 1988 | The Vanishing | Spoorloos | Dutch & French | George Sluizer & Anne Lorden |
| 1989 | Secret Wedding | Boda Secreta | Spanish | Kees Kasander & Dennis Wigman |
| 1990 | Evenings | De avonden | Dutch | René Solleveld & Peter Weijdeveld |
| 1991 | Prospero's Books | Prospero's Books | English | Kees Kasander |
| 1992 | Kyodai Makes the Big Time | Kyodai Makes the Big Time | English | Aryan Kaganof |
| 1993 | The Little Blonde Death | De kleine blonde dood | Dutch | Rob Houwer |
| 1994 | 1000 Roses | 1000 Rosen | Low German | Matthijs van Heijningen |
| 1995 | Little Sister | Zusje | Dutch | Cleo de Koning & Robert Jan Westdijk |
| 1996 | Long Live the Queen | Lang leve de koningin | Dutch | Laurens Geels & Dick Maas |
| 1997 | Character | Karakter | Dutch | Laurens Geels |
| 1998 | Felice...Felice... | Felice…Felice… | Dutch & Japanese | Pieter van Huystee & Suzanne van Voorst |
| 1999 | The Flying Liftboy | Abeltje | Dutch | Burny Bos |
| 2000 | Leak | Lek | Dutch | Rolf Koot & Jean van de Velde |
| 2001 | The Moving True Story of a Woman Ahead of Her Time | Nynke | West Frisian & Dutch | Hans de Wolf & Hans de Weers |
| 2002 | Miss Minoes | Minoes | Dutch | Burny Bos |
| 2003 | Twin Sisters | De tweeling | Dutch & German | Hanneke Niens & Anton Smit |
| 2004 | Simon | Simon | Dutch | Imke Nieuwenhuis |
| 2005 | Paradise Now | الجنّة الآن | Arabic | Bero Beyer |
| 2006 | Black Book | Zwartboek | Dutch & German | San Fu Maltha, Jos van der Linden, Frans van Gestel & Jeroen Beker |
| 2007 | Crusade in Jeans | Kruistocht in spijkerbroek | English | Kees Kasander |
| 2008 | Love is All | Alles is liefde | Dutch | Jeroen Beker, Frans van Gestel, San Fu Maltha & Job Gosschalk |
| 2009 | Nothing Personal | Nothing Personal | English | Reiner Selen & Edwin van Meurs |
| 2010 | Joy | Joy | Dutch | Frans van Gestel & Jeroen Beker |
| 2011 | Black Butterflies | Black Butterflies | English | Frans van Gestel, Richard Claus, Arry Voorsmit & Arnold Heslenfeld |
| 2012 | The Girl and Death | Het meisje en de dood | Russian, German & French | Jos Stelling |
| 2013 | Borgman | Borgman | Dutch | Marc van Warmerdam |
| 2014 | How to Avoid Everything | Aanmodderfakker | Dutch | Iris Otten, Sander van Meurs & Pieter Kuijpers |
| 2015 | Son of Mine | Gluckauf | Limburgish | Joram Willink & Piet-Harm Sterk |
| 2016 | The Paradise Suite | The Paradise Suite | English, French, Bosnian, Swedish, Bulgarian, Serbian & Dutch | Ellen Havenith & Jeroen Beker |
| 2017 | Brimstone | Brimstone | English | Martin Koolhoven |
| 2018 | The Resistance Banker | Bankier van het verzet | Dutch & German | Alain de Levita, Sytze van der Laan & Sabine Brian |
| 2019 | Dirty God | Dirty God | English | Marleen Slot |
| 2020 | Buladó | Buladó | Papiamento | Derk-Jan Warrink & Koji Nelissen |
| 2021 | The Judgement | De veroordeling | Dutch | Joram Willink & Piet-Harm Sterk |
| 2022 | Oink | Knor | Dutch | Marleen Slot |
| 2023 | Sweet Dreams | Zoete dromen | Dutch & Indonesian | Erik Glijnis and Leontine Petit |
| 2024 | Memory Lane | De Terugreis | Dutch, English, French & Spanish | Maarten Kuit and Jeroen van den Idsert |
| 2025 | Our Girls | Voor de meisjes | Dutch, English, German | Derk-Jan Warrink, Koji Nelissen and Marijn Wigman |
| 2026 | Truly Naked | Truly Naked | English | Isabella Depeweg and Els Vandevorst |

== Trivia ==
- 15 former "best feature film"-winners were the Dutch submission for the Academy Award for Best International Film, including Oscar-nominee Twin Sisters and Oscar-winner Character. The other two Dutch Oscar-winners, The Assault and Antonia's Line, didn't win the Golden Calf for Best Feature Film. Oscar-nominee Paradise Now from Dutch-Palestinian filmmaker Hany Abu-Assad was submitted by Palestine.
- Hans, Life Before Death is so far the only Documentary-film to ever win this prize. According to the "Jaarboek film 1984" by Hans Beerekamp, this was a compromise choice when the Golden Calf-jury and organizers of the Netherlands Film Festival didn't agree on the final winner.
- Oink is the only animated film to win this prize.
- Most of the films that won are predominantly Dutch or English spoken. However it has happened three times that a film won in one of the minority languages spoken in the Kingdom of the Netherlands: Nynke in West Frisian, Son of Mine in Limburgish and Buladó in Papiamento.
- Ben Sombogaart is the only director who directed three of the winning films. Joram Lursen, Jos Stelling, Jean van de Velde, Alex van Warmerdam, Pieter Verhoeff, Paul Verhoeven and Mike van Diem all directed two.

== See also ==
List of Dutch submissions for the Academy Award for Best International Feature Film

== Sources ==
- Golden Calf Awards (Dutch)
- NFF Website
