= 33rd Locarno Film Festival =

Film festival in Locarno, Switzerland

- Location: Locarno, Switzerland
- Founded: 1946
- Awards: Golden Leopard: To Love the Damned directed by Marco Tullio Giordana
- Artistic director: Jean-Pierre Brossard
- Festival date: Opening: 1 August 1980; Closing: 10 August 1980
- Website: LFF

Locarno Film Festival
- 34th 32nd

The 33rd Locarno Film Festival was held from 1 to 10 August 1980 in Locarno, Switzerland. The festival was shorter than in the past due to the reopening of the Venice film festival, which was held at a similar time. The Locarno Festival secured an increased budget with more money coming from the government and private industry, including Swiss banks and Swissair. However, after the central government failed to take into account inflation, the festival's budget was not given the full increase.

Locarno screened several films from other festivals. Among the highlights were Camera Buff directed by Krzysztof Kieślowski and Breaking Glass directed by Brian Gibson, with punk singer star Hazel O'Connor's press conference for the film drawing a crowd. The winning pictures at the festival received prize money this year.

The Golden Leopard, the festival's top prize, was awarded to To Love the Damned directed by Marco Tullio Giordana.

== Jury ==
Two members of the Jury were Brazilian director Carlos Diegues and Italian screenwriter Suso Cecchi D'Amico.

== Official Sections ==
The following films were screened in these sections:

=== Main Program ===
==== Feature Films In Competition ====
English Title	Original Title	Director(s)	Year	Production Country
Babylone XX		Ivan Mykolaichuk	1979	Russia
On Fertile Lands	Bereketli Topraklar Üezerinde	Erden Kiral	1980	Türkiye
Breaking Glass		Brian Gibson	1980	Great Britain
Clarence And Angel		Robert Gardner	1980	USA
The Last Years of Childhood	Die Letzten Jahre Der Kindheit	Norbert Kückelmann	1979	Germany
Exterior Night	Exterieur Nuit	Jacques Bral	1980	France
Quilas, the Bad of the Picture	Kilas, O Mau Da Fita	José Fonseca e Costa	1980	Portugal
Kung-Fu		Janusz Kijowski	1979	Poland
The Truth on the Savolta Affair	La Verdad Sobre El Caso Savolta	Antonio Drove	1980	Spain
Maybe Tomorrow	Majd Holnap	Judith Elek	1980	Hungary
To Love the Damned	Maledetti Vi Amerò	Marco Tullio Giordana	1980	Italia
Melodrama?		Nikos Panayotopoulos	1980	Greece
Bitter Morsel	Neem Annapurna	Buddhadeb Dasgupta	1979	India
In for Treatment	Opname	Marja Kok, Erik van Zuylen	1979	Netherlands
Adventure Partners	Parceiros De Aventura	José Araujo de Medieros	1980	Brazil
Polenta		Maya Simon	1980	Switzerland
Back to Marseille	Retour A Marseille	René Allio	1980	France
Semmelweis		Gianfranco Bettetini	1980	Italia
As Far as the Eye Sees	So Weit Das Auge Reicht	Erwin Keusch	1980	Germany
A Man, Some Women	Sëy Sëyeti	Ben Diogaye Beye	1980	Senegal
Exit ... Just Don't Panic	Exit...Nur Keine Panik	Franz Novotny		Austria*

==== Out of Competition ====
Feature Films Out of Competition
Original Title	English Title	Director(s)	Production Country
Amator	Amateur	Krzysztof Kieslowski	Poland
Amor De Perdiçao	Sort	Manoel de Oliveira	Portugal
Bye Bye Brasil		Carlos Diegues	Brazil
Ekdin Pratidin	One Day Every Day	Mrinal Sen	India
Merry Go Round		Jacques Rivette	France
Noroit	Norot	Jacques Rivette	France
Palermo Oder Wolfsburg	Palermo or Wolfsburg	Werner Schröter	Germany
Stalker		Andrej Tarkovskij	Russia

=== Special Sections ===
==== Panorama ====
Information - Outside Panorama
Original title	English title	Director(s)	Year	Production country
Aziza	Azza	Abdellatif Ben Ammar		Tunisia
Deutschland Privat	Germany Private	Erwin Kneihsl, Robert Van Ackeren		Germany
Er Quan Ying Yue	Er Q U'anying Y UE	Yan Zhou		China
Fragments, Un Reste D'Images	Fragments, a Remainder of Images	Nabil Maleh		Syria
Information - Panorama
A Confederacao		Luis Galvåo Teles		Portugal
Bruxelles Transit		Samy Szlingerbaum		Belgium
Dvonikat	Swab	Nikolaï Volev		Bulgaria
Mueda-Memora E Massacre		Ruy Guerra		Mozambico
Notre Fille	Our Daughter	Daniel Kamwa		Cameroon
Radiostacion	Radio Station	Rikard Ljarja		Albanie
Surja Dighal Bari	Teaching Bari	Sheik Niamat Ali, Mashihuddin Shaker		Bangladesh

==== French Cinémathèque ====
La Cinémathèque Française Present
Original title	English title	Director(s)	Year	Production country
El Dorado	The Gold	Marcel LHerbier	1921	France
L'Inondation	Flooding	Louis Delluc	1923	France
La Glace A Trois Faces	Ice Has Three Faces	Jean Epstein	1927	France

==== Polish Week ====
Polish Week
Original title	English title	Director(s)	Year	Production country
Aktorzy Prowincjonalni	Provincial Actors	Agnieszka Holland	1979	Poland
Aria Dla Atlety	Aria Dla Athletes	Filip Bajon	1979	Poland
Barwy Ochronne	Protective Colors	Krzysztof Zanussi	1977	Poland
Pelnia	FREEMIA	Andrzej Kondratiuk	1979	Poland
Umarla Klasa	The Class Died	Andrzej Wajda	1978	Poland
Wodzierej	Water	Feliks Falk	1978	Poland

==== Swiss Information ====
Swiss Information - Feature Films
Original title	English title	Director(s)	Year	Production country
Das Gefrorene Herz	The Frozen Heart	Xavier Koller		Switzerland
Le Chemin Perdu	The Lost Path	Patricia Moraz		Switzerland
Quand Il N'Y A Plus D'Eldorado	When There is No more Eldorado	Claude Champion		Switzerland
Ritorno A Casa	Return Home	Nino Jacusso		Switzerland
Un Homme En Fuite	A Man on the Run	Simon Edelstein		Switzerland
Uramai	Mero	Giovanni Doffini		Switzerland
Swiss Information - Short And Medium-Length Films
Au Bord Du Lac	By the Lake	Michel Rode		Switzerland
Onore E Riposo	Honor and Rest	Fernando Raffaeli Colla		Switzerland
Play 28/29		HHK Schönherr		Switzerland
Rich And Famous		Heinz Schmid, Gro Ström		Switzerland
Space Gambler		Georges Dufaux		Switzerland

=== Tribute To - Marcel L'Herbier ===
Tribute To Marcel L'Herbier (1888-1979)
Original title	English title	Director(s)	Year	Production country
Adrienne Lecouvreur		Marcel L'Herbier	1938	France
Autour De L'Argent	Around Money	Jean Dréville	1928	France
El Dorado	The Gold	Marcel L'Herbier	1921	France
Feu Mathias Pascal		Marcel L'Herbier	1925	France
L'Argent	Money	Marcel L'Herbier	1929	France
L'Enfant De L'Amour	The Child of Love	Marcel L'Herbier	1930	France
L'Homme Du Large	The Man of the Sea	Marcel L'Herbier	1920	France
L'Inhumaine	Inhuman	Marcel L'Herbier	1924	France
La Comedie Du Bonheur	The Comedy of Happiness	Marcel L'Herbier	1940	France
La Mode Revee	Revee Fashion	Marcel L'Herbier	1939	France
La Nuit Fantastique	Fantastic Night	Marcel L'Herbier	1942	France
La Revolte	To Riots	Marcel L'Herbier	1949	France
La Vie de bohème	Boheme Life	Marcel L'Herbier	1945	France
Le Bonheur	Happiness	Marcel L'Herbier	1935	France
Le Parfum De La Dame En Noir	The Scent of the Lady in Black	Marcel L'Herbier	1931	France
Nuits De Feu	Fire Nights	Marcel L'Herbier	1937	France
Rose France		Marcel L'Herbier	1919	France

=== Film Critics Week ===
FIPRESCI - International Federation of Film Critics Week
Original title	English title	Director(s)	Year	Production country
Anthracite		Edouard Niermans		France
Balada Pro Banditu	The Pro of the Force Arrived	Vladimir Sis		Czech Republic
Boomerang		Ivan Nitchev		Bulgaria
Das Höchste Gut Einer Frau Ist Ihr Schweigen	The Highest Asset of a Woman is Her Silence	Gertrud Pinkus		Switzerland
Der Willi Busch Report	The Willi Busch Report	Klaus Schilling		Germany
Hungerjahre	Hunger	Jutta Brückner		Germany
P.S		Roland Gräf		Germany
Szansa	Chance	Feliks Falk		Poland

== Official Awards ==
=== International Jury ===
- Golden Leopard: To Love the Damned by Marco Tullio Giordana
- Silver Leopard: CLARENCE AND ANGEL by Robert Gardner
- Bronze Leopard: IN FOR TREATMENT by Marja Kok and Erik van Zuylen
- Official Jury Mention: SËY SËYETI by Ben Diogaye Beye, NEEM ANNAPURNA by Buddhadeb Dasgupta
- Ernest Artaria Prize: EXTERIEUR NUIT by Antoine Bonfanti and Pierre-William Glen

=== FIRPESCI Jury ===
- International critics prize: MAJD HOLNAP by Judith Elek, KUNG-FU by Janusz Kijowski
- Prize of 2’500 fr.: RITORNO A CASA by Nino Jacusso
