= 1000 Roses =

1994 film

1000 Rosen
- Theatrical release poster
- Directed by: Theu Boermans
- Written by: Gustav Ernst
- Produced by: Matthijs van Heijningen
- Starring: Marieke Heebink; Jaap Spijkers
- Music by: Lodewijk de Boer
- Distributed by: Shooting Star Film Distribution
- Release date: 29 September 1994
- Running time: 95 minutes
- Country: Netherlands
- Language: Low German
- Budget: fl 2.000.000

1000 Roses (Dutch: 1000 Rosen) is a 1994 Dutch drama film directed by Theu Boermans and based on a play by Gustav Ernst. It was the opening movie of the Netherlands Film Festival and won the Golden Calves for Best Feature Film, Best Actress (Heebink) and Best Actor (Spijkers). Even though it won these awards, it wasn't a commercial success. The movie attracted 6.518 visitors and made 29.710 euros.

== Plot ==
In the 1960s, an industrial town is in turmoil after the local steel factory is going to shut down. Together with her mother, Gina runs a small business in gardening and DIY tools. They also get help from her boyfriend Harry, although her mother is not very fond of him.

Gina and her mother get into an argument when Gina buys a computer and hires an accountant, Kernstock, to modernise the business. She gets a loan from her uncle, the bank manager, and decides to expand. Americans appear in the town to invest in the small industrial town. The impending shutdown of steel factory appears to be over. But when it turns out that the Americans have bought the failing steel factory merely for speculation, the industrial town dies out.

== Cast ==
- Marieke Heebink ... Gina
- Jaap Spijkers ... Harry
- Tessa Lilly Wyndham ... Liesje
- Marianne Rogée ... Gina's Mother
- Marisa Van Eyle ... Rita
- Bert Geurkink ... Kernstock
- Hannes Demming ... Uncle / Bank manager
- Rik Launspach ... Mr. Marshall
- Busso Mehring ... Clochard
- Georg Bühren ... Bank employee
- Michiel Mentens ... Mr. Offermans
- Camilla Mercier ... Old Lady
- Jean Vercoutere ... Factory manager
- Clement Franz ... Mayor
- Christian Deuson ... Politie commissioner

== Background ==
The Austrian playwright Gustav Ernst depicts a town where people are sick and vomit blood on the streets. Because of the impending shutdown of the local factory, everyone is upset and worried. But then, the Americans arrive and they bring a lot of wealth and prosperity with them. But that does not bring happiness. 1000 Rosen, despite being realistic, is a parable about Europe after WWII. After the World War, Europe was broken and sick, but scrambled back on its feet with the help of the United States. Not without a sense of irony, the American who takes over the factory is called Mr Marshall. The same name as the person responsible for the Marshall plan, former minister of Foreign Affairs, George Marshall.

According to Ernst's point of view, the prosperity brought by the Americans only brings envy and speculation. The rose bushes that overrun the town at the end of the movie are reminiscent of the fairy tale Sleeping Beauty. But considering that the sounds of the Stabat Mater can be heard indicates that it is not about sleep, but death.

== Production ==
Director Theu Boermans performed the play 1000 Rosen in 1990, with the theatre company De Trust. In the movie adaptation, he used some of the actors from this group. To increase the alienation effect, the actors speak in Low German. Boermans shot the film in 34 days on site in Bois du Luc, a village in southern Belgium, and in the halls of Amsterdam's (former) Westergasfabriek. The total budget was 2 million Dutch guilders (around 900.000 euros).
