= List of submissions to the 60th Academy Awards for Best Foreign Language Film =

1987 Best Foreign Language Film submissions

Highlights
- Oscar winner: (Denmark) Babette's Feast
- Submissions: 30
- Debuts: 1

This is a list of submissions to the 60th Academy Awards for Best Foreign Language Film. The Academy Award for Best Foreign Language Film was created in 1956 by the Academy of Motion Picture Arts and Sciences to honour non-English-speaking films produced outside the United States. The award is handed out annually, and is accepted by the winning film's director, although it is considered an award for the submitting country as a whole. Countries are invited by the Academy to submit their best films for competition according to strict rules, with only one film being accepted from each country.

For the 60th Academy Awards, thirty films were submitted in the category Academy Award for Best Foreign Language Film. The critically acclaimed Wings of Desire, by Wim Wenders, submitted by West Germany, wasn't nominated, despite being one of the favorites. Indonesia submitted a film for the first time, and Cuba submitted a film for the first time in a decade. The Soviet Union submitted a film in Georgian (which was produced in 1984, but banned until 1987), India chose a film in Tamil, and Norway selected the first-ever film made in Northern Sami. The five nominated films came from France, Italy, Norway, Spain, and Denmark.

Denmark won for the first time with Babette's Feast by Gabriel Axel.

== Submissions ==
| Submitting country | Film title used in nomination | Original title | Language(s) | Director(s) | Result |
|---|---|---|---|---|---|
| Argentina | Man Facing Southeast | Hombre mirando al sudeste | Spanish | Eliseo Subiela | Not nominated |
| Austria | Welcome in Vienna | Wohin und zurück – Welcome in Vienna | German | Axel Corti | Not nominated |
| Belgium | The Cruel Embrace | Les Noces barbares | French | Marion Hänsel | Not nominated |
| Brazil | Subway to the Stars | Um Trem para as Estrelas | Brazilian Portuguese | Carlos Diegues | Not nominated |
| Canada | Night Zoo | Un zoo la nuit | French | Jean-Claude Lauzon | Not nominated |
| China | Hibiscus Town | 芙蓉镇 | Mandarin | Xie Jin | Not nominated |
| Cuba | A Successful Man | Un hombre de éxito | Spanish | Humberto Solás | Not nominated |
| Czechoslovakia | Forbidden Dreams | Smrt krásných srnců | Czech | Karel Kachyňa | Not nominated |
| Denmark | Babette's Feast | Babettes gæstebud | Danish, Swedish, French | Gabriel Axel | Won Academy Award |
| Finland | The Snow Queen | Lumikuningatar | Finnish | Päivi Hartzell | Not nominated |
| France | Au revoir les enfants | | French, German | Louis Malle | Nominated |
| West Germany | Wings of Desire | Der Himmel über Berlin | German, English, French, Turkish, Hebrew, Spanish | Wim Wenders | Not nominated |
| Greece | Theofilos | Θεόφιλος | Greek | Lakis Papastathis | Not nominated |
| Hungary | Diary for My Lovers | Napló szerelmeimnek | Hungarian, Russian | Márta Mészáros | Not nominated |
| Iceland | White Whales | Skytturnar | Icelandic | Friðrik Þór Friðriksson | Not nominated |
| India | Nayakan | நாயகன் | Tamil | Mani Ratnam | Not nominated |
| Indonesia | Nagabonar | | Indonesian | M.T. Risyaf | Not nominated |
| Israel | I Don't Give a Damn | לא שם זין | Hebrew | Shmuel Imberman | Not nominated |
| Italy | The Family | La famiglia | Italian | Ettore Scola | Nominated |
| Japan | Zegen | 女衒 | Japanese | Shohei Imamura | Not nominated |
| Mexico | Living Is What Matters | Lo que importa es vivir | Spanish | Luis Alcoriza | Not nominated |
| Netherlands | Count Your Blessings | Van geluk gesproken | Dutch | Pieter Verhoeff | Not nominated |
| Norway | Pathfinder | Ofelaš, Veiviseren | Northern Sámi | Nils Gaup | Nominated |
| Poland | Hero of the Year | Bohater roku | Polish | Feliks Falk | Not nominated |
| Soviet Union | Repentance | მონანიება | Georgian | Tengiz Abuladze | Not nominated |
| Spain | Course Completed | Asignatura aprobada | Spanish | José Luis Garci | Nominated |
| Sweden | Hip Hip Hurrah! | Hip Hip Hurra! | Swedish, Danish | Kjell Grede | Not nominated |
| Switzerland | If the Sun Never Returns | Si le soleil ne revenait pas | French | Claude Goretta | Not nominated |
| Taiwan | Osmanthus Alley | 桂花巷 | Mandarin | Chen Kunhou | Not nominated |
| Yugoslavia | Reflections | Već viđeno | Serbo-Croatian, Esperanto | Goran Marković | Not nominated |
