= Mates (1999 film) =

1999 film

- Written by: Pieter Verhoeff, Kees van Beijnum
- Directed by: Pieter Verhoeff
- Country of origin: Netherlands
- Original language: Dutch

Production
- Producers: Hans de Weers; Hans de Wolf
- Running time: 90 minutes

Original release
- Release: 11 May 1999

Mates or Maten is a 1999 Dutch TV film directed by Pieter Verhoeff.

== Cast ==
- Kees Boot ... Theo Pals
- Elsie de Brauw
- Hans Breetveld ... Sergeant Frank Houtman
- Erik de Bruyn
- Khaldoun Elmecky
- Thijs Feenstra
- Bert Geurkink
- Marc Hazewinkel
- Arend Jan Heerma van Voss
- Monic Hendrickx
- Marja Kok ... Moeder Winters
- Merel Laseur
- Johan Leysen... Officier Blaak
- Jacques Luijer
- Willem Nijholt ... Hoofdofficier Meesingh
- Roef Ragas ... Rob
- Victor Reinier
- Tjerk Risselada
- Ronald Top
- Wimie Wilhelm
- Helmert Woudenberg ... Vader Winters
