= The Mark of the Beast (film) =

1980 Dutch film

- Directed by: Pieter Verhoeff
- Starring: Gerard Thoolen; Marja Kok
- Cinematography: Mat van Hensbergen
- Music by: Ruud Bos
- Distributed by: Concorde Film
- Release date: 25 September 1980
- Running time: 98 minutes
- Country: Netherlands
- Languages: Dutch; West Frisian

The Mark of the Beast (Dutch: Het teken van het beest) is a 1980 Dutch drama film directed by Pieter Verhoeff. It is based on the life of IJje Wijkstra who in 1929 murdered four police officers.

The film won the first Golden Calf for Best Feature Film award at the 1981 Netherlands Film Festival. Marja Kok also won the Golden Calf for Best Actress for her role in the film.

== Plot ==
Mason IJje Wijkstra starts a relationship with Aaltje Botter, a married woman with 6 children, in a time when adultery was illegal.

== Cast ==
- Gerard Thoolen as IJje Wijkstra
- Marja Kok as Aaltje Botter
- Peter Faber as Durk Tabak
- Joop Admiraal as pastor
