= De Langste Reis =

1997 film

- Directed by: Pieter Verhoeff
- Written by: Kees van Beijnum
- Release date: 1997
- Running time: 90 minutes
- Country: Netherlands
- Language: Dutch

De Langste Reis is a 1997 Dutch crime film directed by Pieter Verhoeff. The film deals with a kidnapping and Stockholm syndrome.

== Cast ==
- Eric van der Donk ... Schuyt
- Han Kerkhoffs ... Cop
- Johan Leysen ... Mertens
- Mads Wittermans
