= The Sunday Child =

De Zondagsjongen
- Theatrical release poster
- Directed by: Pieter Verhoeff
- Written by: Jan Bosdriesz (writer), Cherry Duyns (novel)
- Starring: Rik Van Uffelen; Tom Van Hezik; Magdalena Ritter
- Release date: 24 January 1992
- Running time: 95 minutes
- Country: Netherlands
- Language: Dutch

The Sunday Child or De Zondagsjongen is a 1992 Dutch film directed by Pieter Verhoeff. Filming of Cherry Duyns' debut novel about the life of one in 1944 from a German-born Dutch boy. It is June 1988. On the way to his family in Germany is confronted the man in the train with football fans who will attend the match Netherlands-Germany for the European football championships. The revival of anti-German sentiments reminiscent of his youth. Sunday is a boy with flashbacks larded film about loyalty, love, betrayal and liberation.

== Cast ==
- Rik van Uffelen ... Anton - Age 44
- Tom van Hezik ... Anton (aged 8)
- Magdalena Ritter ... Moeder
- Toon Agterberg ... Vader
- Franz Braunshausen ... Otto
- Gerard Thoolen ... Buschmann
- Vastert van Aardenne ... Anton - Age 22
- Ann Hasekamp ... Grootmoeder
- Sonya Bayer ... Angelika
- Robert Zimmerling ... Grootvader in Duitsland
- Malvina Möller-Bradford ... Grootmoeder in Duitsland
- Ivo Dolder ... Sturm
- Georg Vietje ... Winckler
