= Nam Kee =

Restaurant in the Netherlands

Coordinates: 52.37371°N 4.90034°E

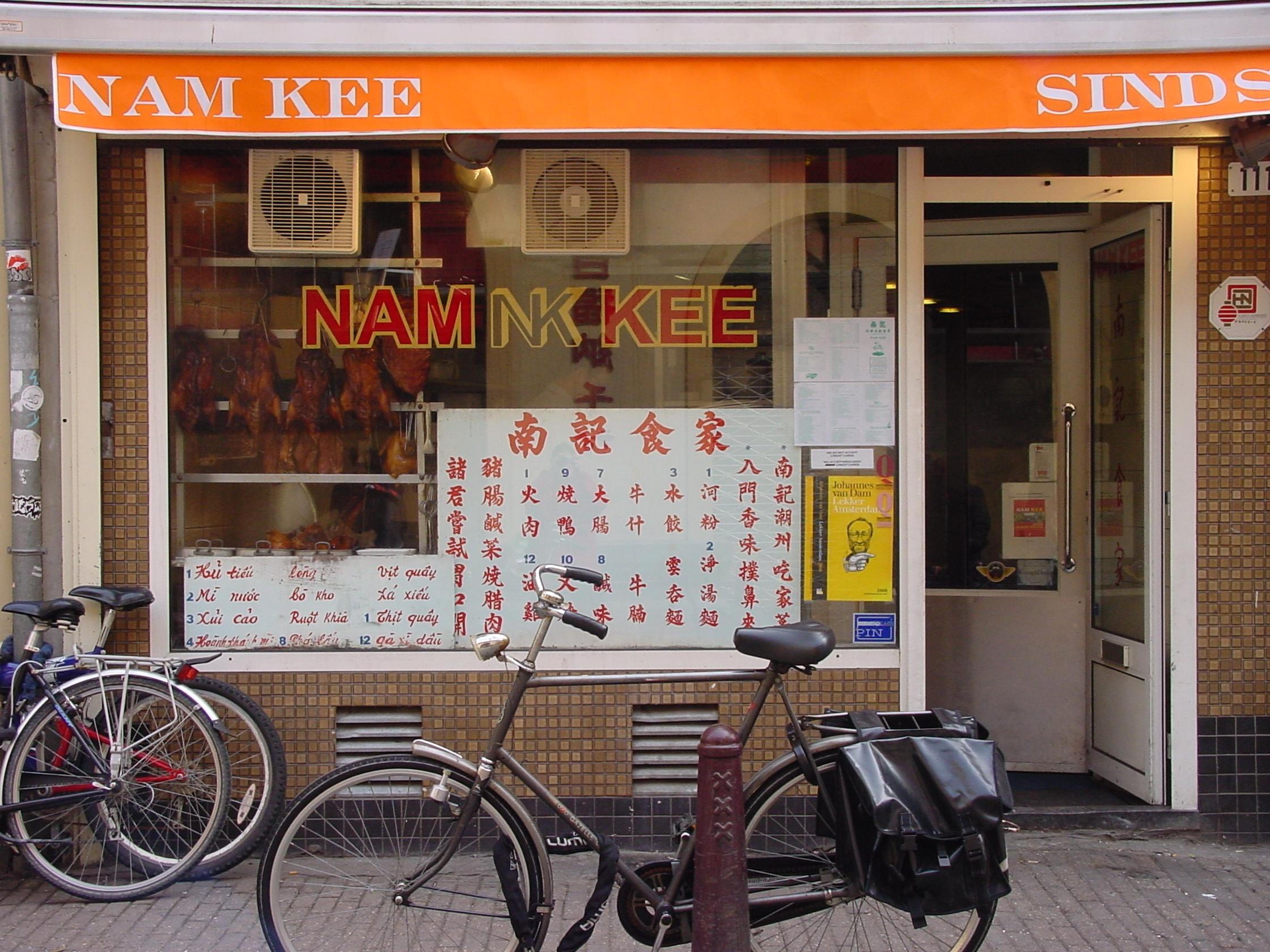
- Nam Kee at the Zeedijk in Amsterdam
- Interactive map of Nam Kee
- Location: Amsterdam
- Owner: Nam Chan

Construction
- Opened: 1981

Website
- www.namkee.net

Nam Kee (Chinese: 南記) is a chain of three Chinese restaurants in Amsterdam, Netherlands. Nam Kee is seen as an Amsterdam icon by The New York Times.

== History ==
The original restaurant opened at the Zeedijk in 1981 (currently at no. 111–113), followed by restaurants at the Geldersekade 117 in 1992 and at the Marie Heinekenplein 4 in 2010. The name means "Friend Nam" in Chinese, after the owner Nam Chan.

Nam Kee is a favourite of many people in Amsterdam and a place to be seen, including by celebrities such as Rijk de Gooyer (deceased), Joop Braakhekke (deceased) and stars from Goede tijden, slechte tijden and also artists and bank directors.

Nam Kee became nationally known in the Netherlands after writer Kees van Beijnum released his 2000 novel De Oesters van Nam Kee ("Oysters at Nam Kee's") which was subsequently made into a 2002 Dutch drama film.

The Zeedijk restaurant was fined for poor hygiene in 2002.
