= Apricot Tree International Documentary Film Festival =

Annual film festival in Armenia

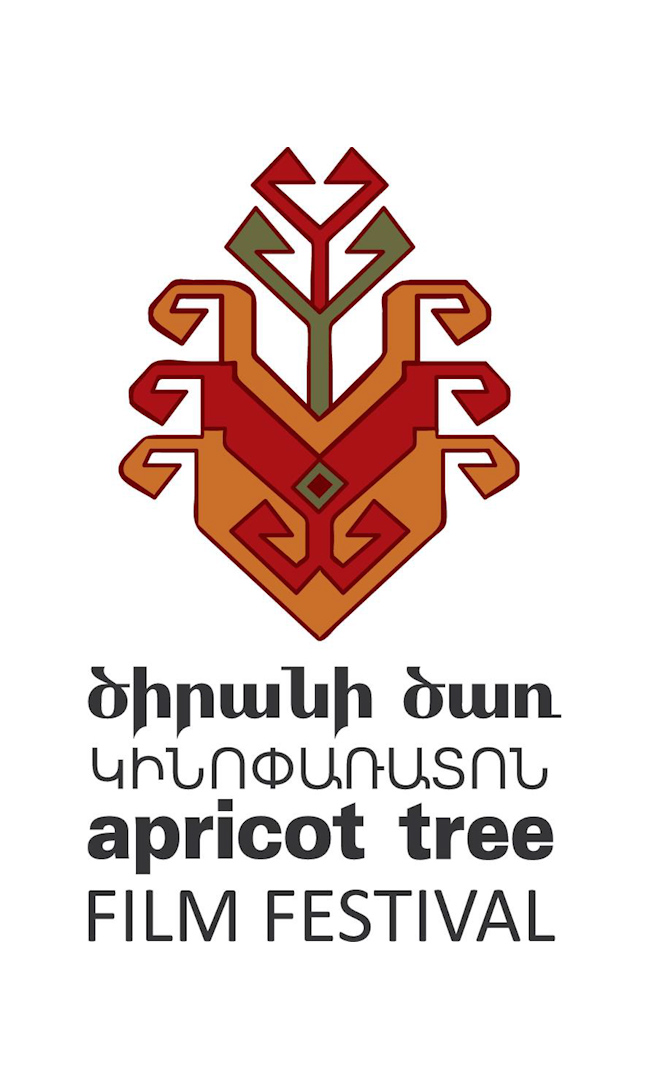
- Location: Armenia
- Established: 2015
- Founded by: Garegin Zakoyan
- Hosted by: Filmadaran Film Culture Development NGO
- Language: Armenian, English
- Website: https://festival.filmadaran.org/en/index

The Apricot Tree International Documentary Film Festival (Armenian: «Ծիրանի ծառ» վավերագրական ֆիլմերի միջազգային փառատոն, romanized: “Tsirani tsar” vaveragrakan filmeri mijazgayin kinop’araton, formerly known as Apricot Tree International Ethnographic Film Festival, also known as Apricot Tree IDFF and ATIEFF) is an annual film festival that takes place in various villages of Armenia.

The festival is organized by the Filmadaran Film Culture Development NGO. First implemented in 2015 in Yerevan, the festival expanded to Gyumri in 2016. and in 2017-2022 it took place entirely in the village of Ujan in Armenia's Aragatsotn Province. Since 2023, it has been held in the villages of Debed and Dsegh in Armenia's Lori Province. The festival is accompanied by a Film School program, within the framework of which rural children learn to shoot their own short films.

The festival aims to decentralize the cultural life in Armenia, where the majority of events take place in the capital city of Yerevan, and inspire creativity and awareness among rural populations, while also promoting intercultural dialogue between Armenian and foreign creatives. It is the only film festival in Armenia that puts documentary cinema in the forefront and one of the rare film festivals in the world that takes place in a village.

== History ==
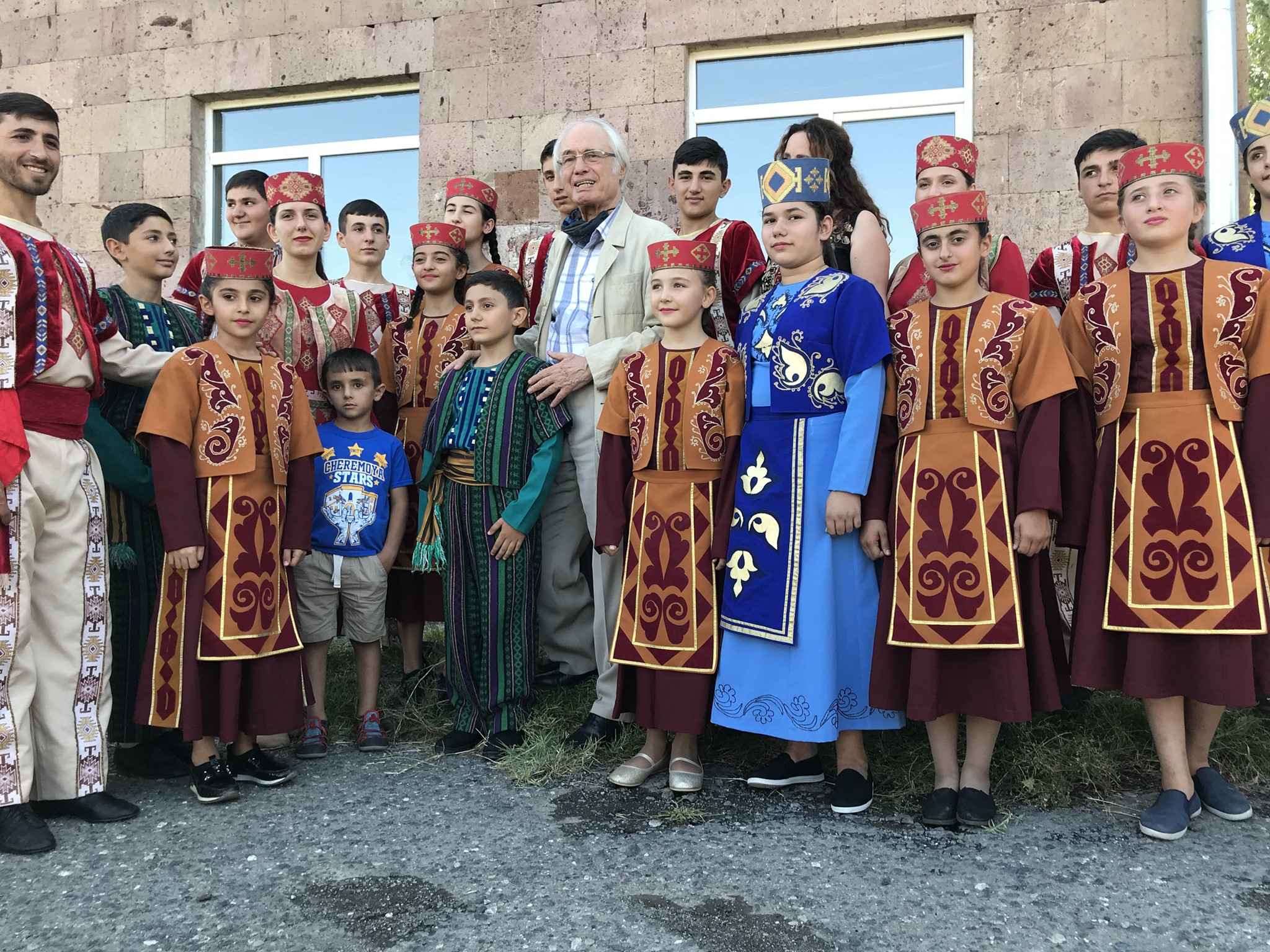
Tigran Mansurian’s visit to Ujan (Apricot Tree IDFF, September 2020)

Apricot Tree Film Festival was established and first implemented in 2015 in Yerevan under the name Apricot Tree Ethnographic Film Festival. In 2016, the festival organizers established Filmdaran Film Culture Development NGO, which implements the festival to this day. That same year, the festival expanded its geography, this time organizing screenings in Gyumri and Ujan.

In 2017, the festival found a home in the village of Ujan in Armenia's Aragatsotn Province, where participants lived and main festival events took place. The idea of basing the festival in Ujan was inspired and supported by film producer and businessman Martin Adoyan. Local and international participants lived in the houses of Ujan villagers. The opening ceremony that year was followed by a screening of Chronicle of a Summer (1961) by the famed filmmaker Jean Rouch in honor of his centennial. The program included 31 films, 6 of which were Armenian.

In 2018, the festival moved its dates from early October to mid-September. In 2021, the festival shifted its dates again, this time to late August and included 29 films. Also in 2021, the opening ceremony of the festival featured the feature-length docudrama Ujan Story by Iranian documentary filmmaker Shahram Badakhshan Mehr. The director had visited Armenia for the first time in 2017, becoming the Grand Prize winner of that year. In 2022, a different festival guest, Swedish filmmaker, Knutte Wester, also made a short documentary in Armenia.

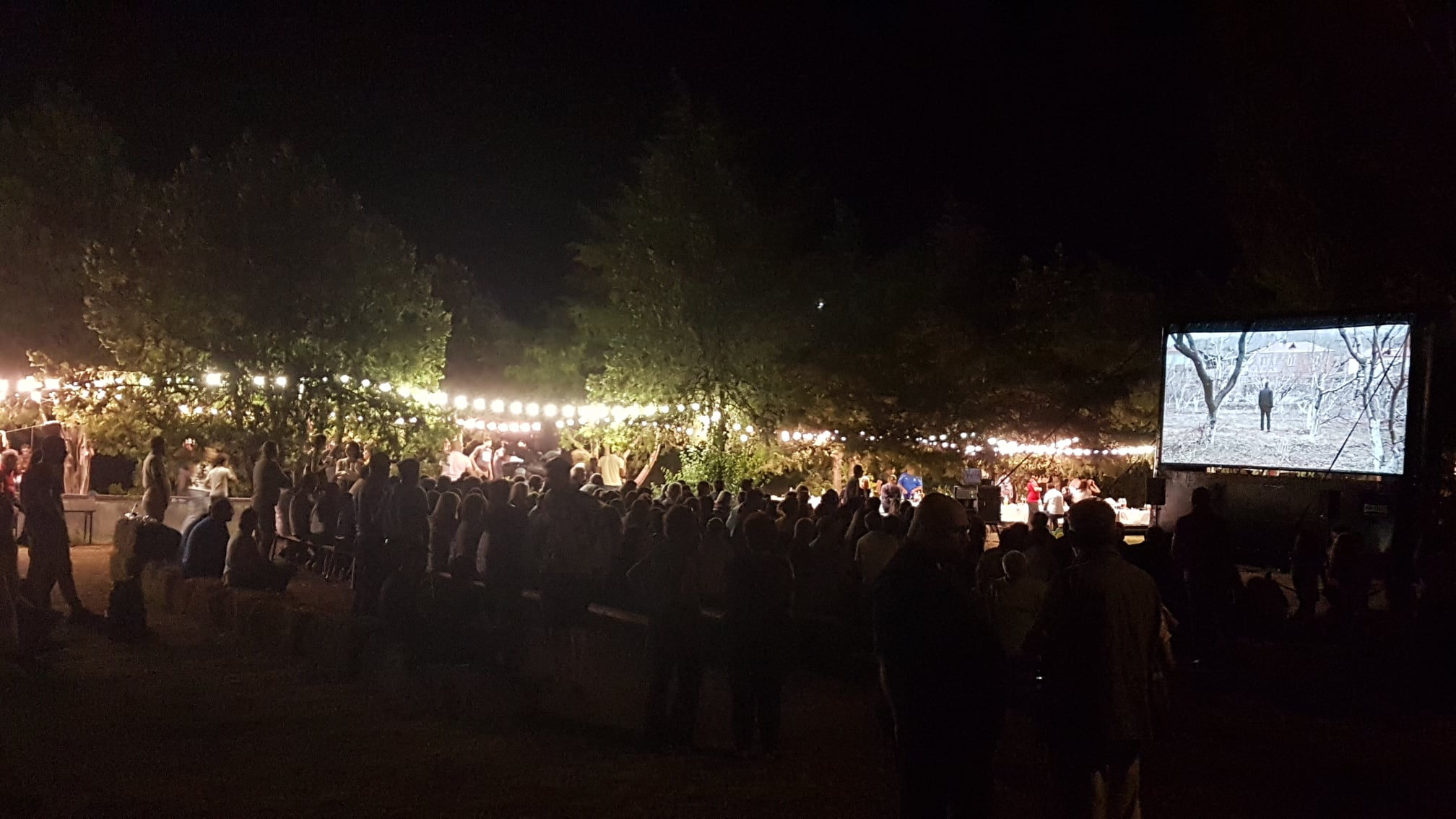
Ujan Story premiere during the opening ceremony of Apricot Tree IDFF 2021

In 2023, striving to expand its geography yet again and to implement the festival concept in a different rural environment, Apricot Tree IDFF moved to the village of Debet (Debed) in Armenia's Lori Province. That year, the festival's non-competition section had a program called We Have Each Other dedicated to the blockaded Artsakh. In 2024, there were also screenings in the village of Dsegh not far from Debed, and more specifically at the house-museum of famed Armenian poet Hovhannes Tumanyan, where the festival paid tribute to Sergei Parajanov on the occasion of his 100th anniversary.

Most of the festival's screenings take place in the evenings, under the open sky, while during the day films are in village culture clubs. During the festival, various workshops are held for local and foreign aspiring filmmakers and rural teenagers, and festival participants are invited on almost daily excursions.

During the years, Apricot Tree IDFF has established friendly relations and partnerships with several international film festivals, including Millenium Festival (Brussels, Belgium), Cinemistica IFF (Granada, Spain), CineDoc-Tbilisi (Georgia) and the Belgrade Festival of Ethnological Film (Serbia).

In 2015-2023 the festival was headed by film scholar, filmmaker and Filmadaran NGO president Garegin Zakoyan. Since 2024, the title of festival director has been held by film critic Artur Vardikyan. Filmmaker Vahan Khachatryan, producer and IT-specialist Armen Petrosian are founding members of the festival team, while filmmaker and coordinator Naira Sargsyan is the core team's newest edition.

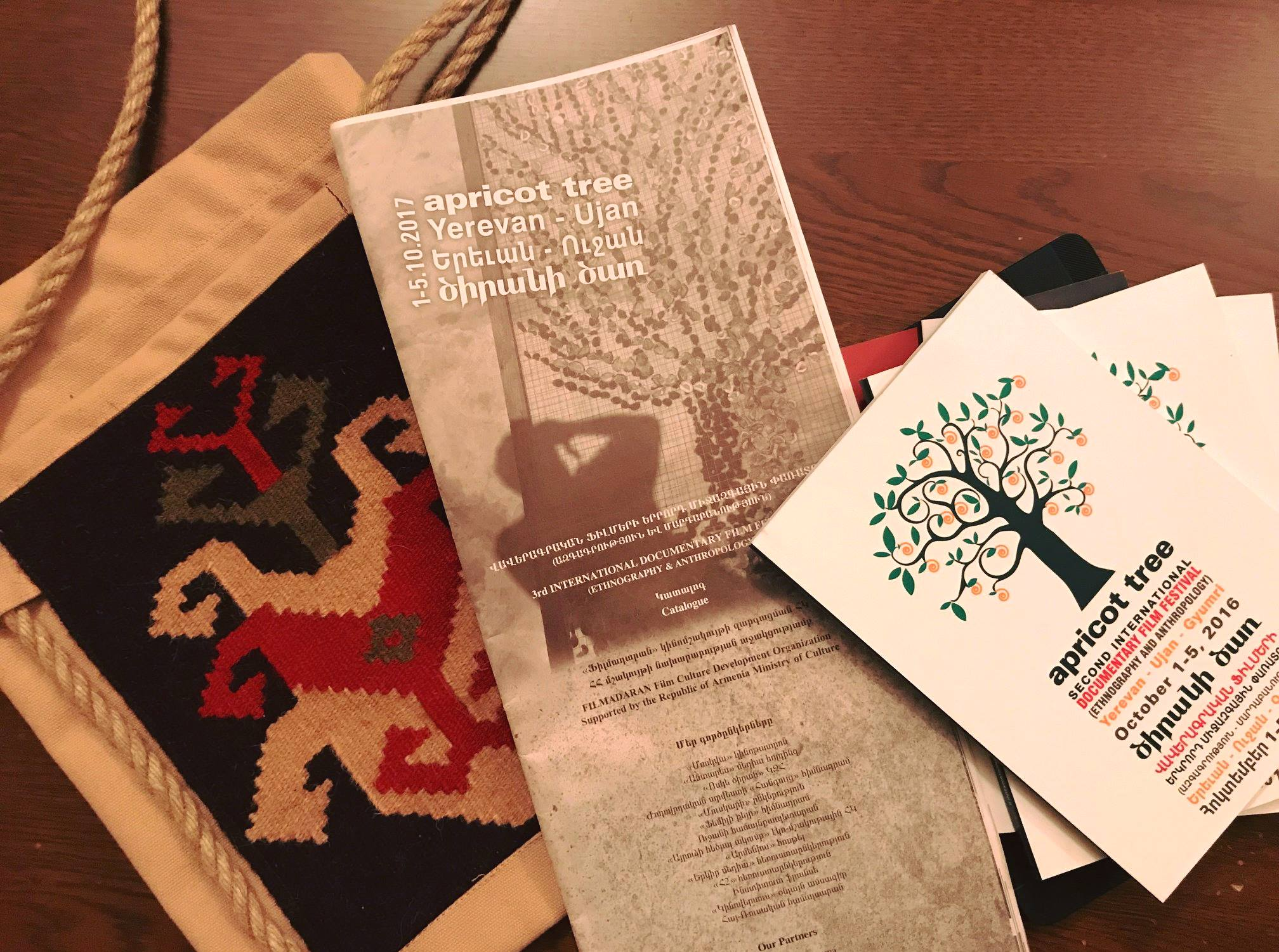
Festival catalogues and tote bag

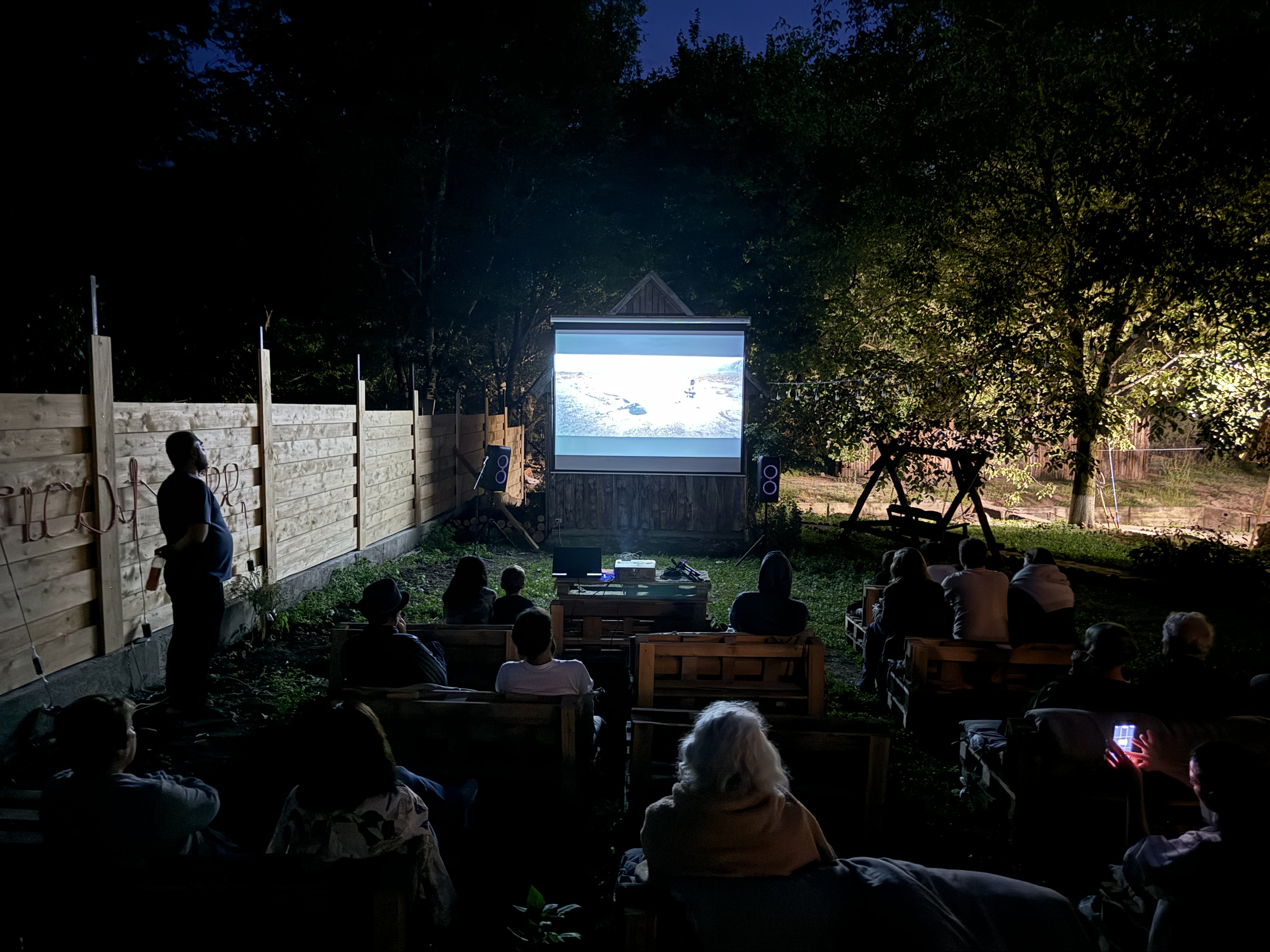
Open-air screening in Debed village (Apricot Tree IDFF 2024)

In various years, Apricot Tree IDFF has partnered with the Ministry of Culture of Armenia (now the Republic of Armenia Ministry of Education, Science, Culture and Sport), the H.Hovnanian Family Foundation, the Golden Apricot Fund for Cinema Development, the Folk Arts Hub Foundation, the EU Delegation in Armenia, Goethe-Zentrum Eriwan, Institut francais d’Armenie and the French Embassy in Armenia, the Embassy of Serbia, the Embassy of the Kingdom of the Netherlands, the Embassy of Bulgaria, the Russian-Armenian (Slavonic) University in Yerevan and others.

In the last decade, Apricot Tree IDFF has screened about 250 feature-length and short films in Yerevan and Armenia's regions, the majority of which were translated into Armenian for the first time. Throughout its history, the festival has had thousands of spectators and hosted around 120 foreign and local participants.

The 12th edition of the festival will take place from September 5-12 in the village of Debed.

== Film School ==
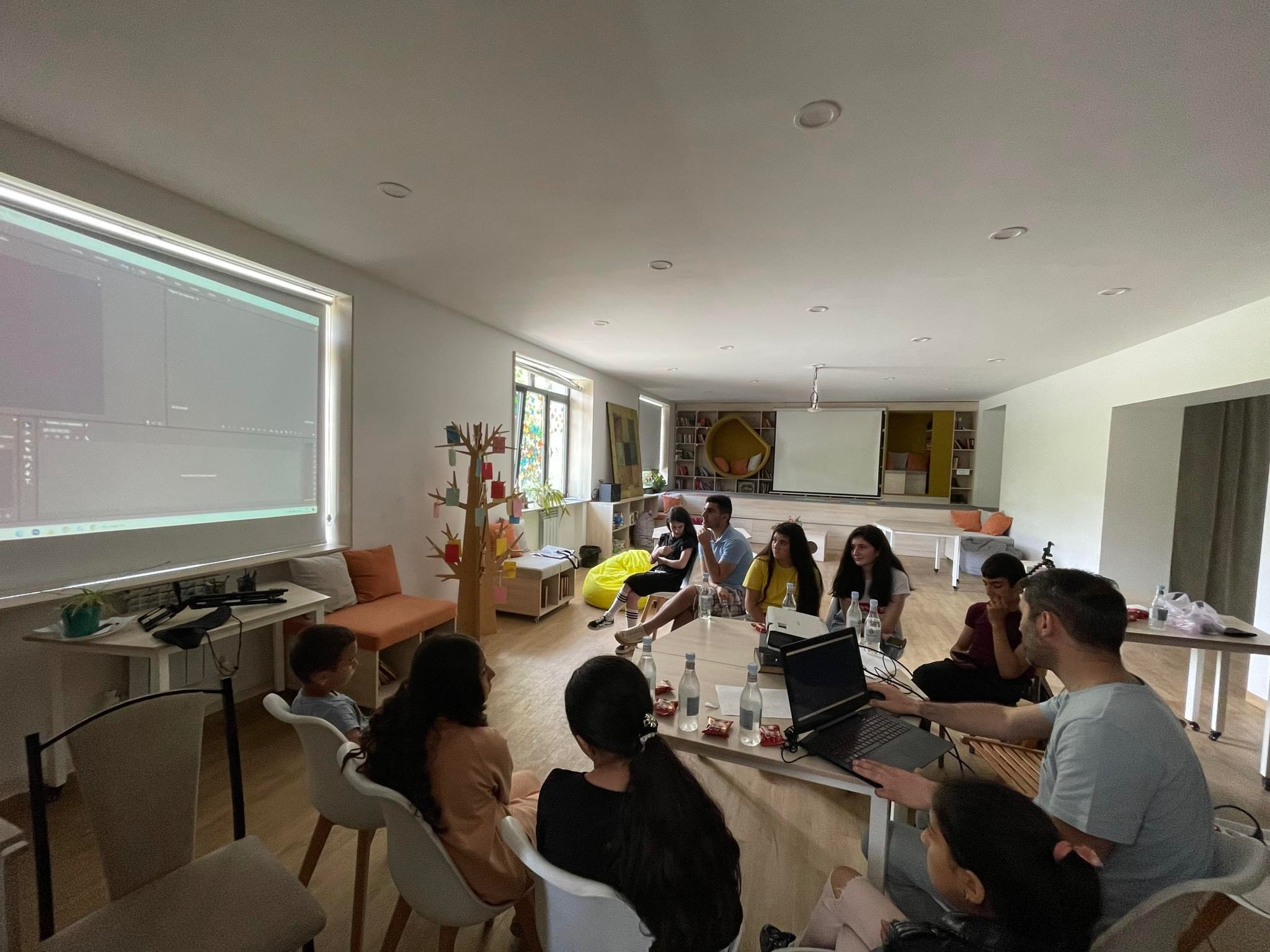
Debet Film School (Apricot Tree IDFF, 2023)

Since 2019, the festival also organized the Apricot Tree Film School, where under the guidance of Filmadaran NGO specialists and foreign festival guests, village kids learn to make their own short films. The many documentary and feature shorts made within the frames of the program are traditionally screened at the end of that year's festival's closing ceremony. Before the film school, in 2017, film students from the Russian-Armenian (Slavonic) University of Yerevan were making a student film in Ujan.In 2025, the Film school workshop within the frames of the festival was led by Italian filmmaker Marta Violante.

== Goals and Aims ==
The idea to organize a rural film festival was born out of the desire to decentralize the cultural life in Armenia by making rural population an active part of it. During the festival, both Armenian and foreign participants live in the same environment as the villagers, sometimes in the villagers' homes.

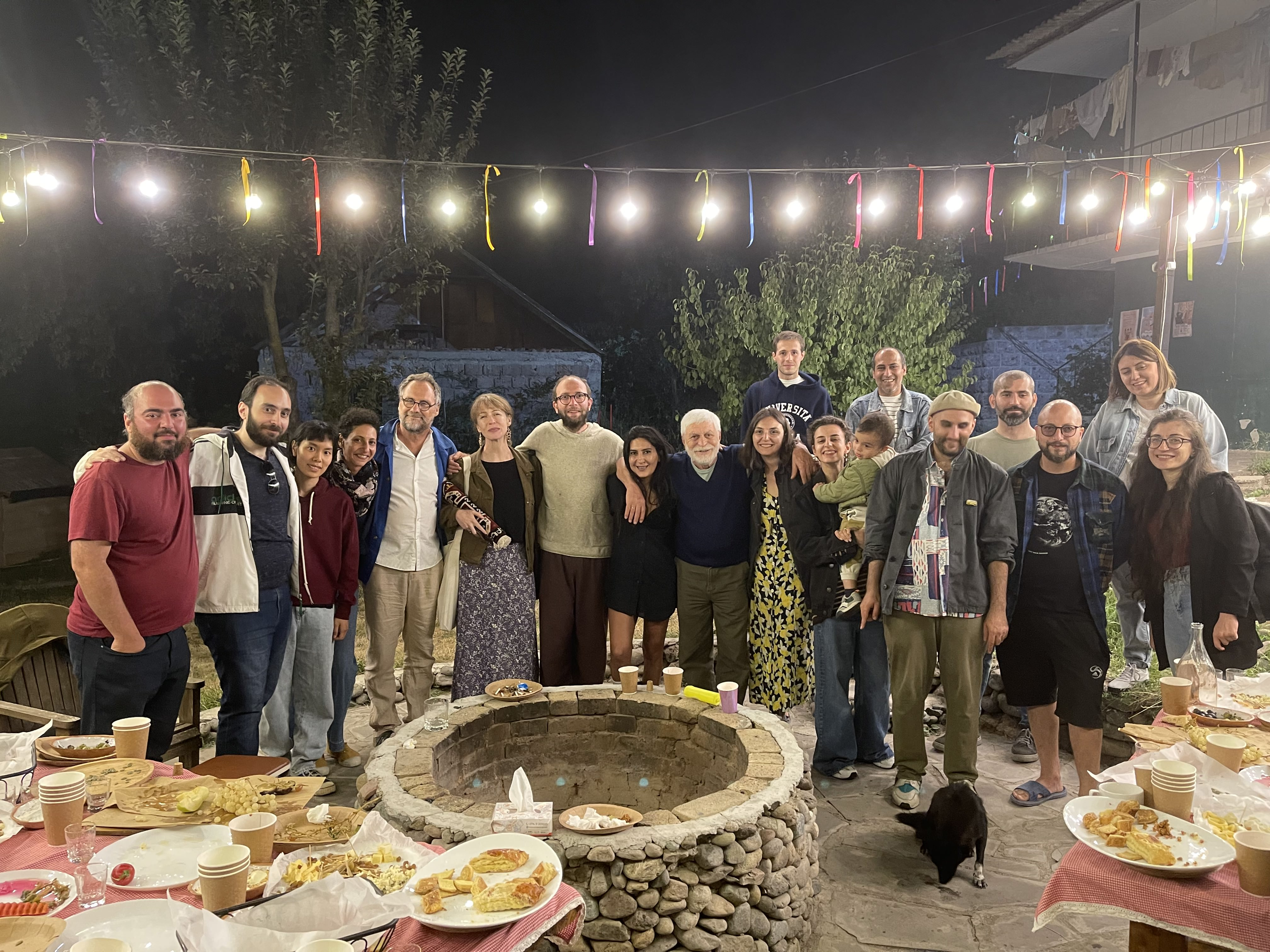
The closing ceremony of the 9th Apricot Tree IDFF (August, 2023)

The organizers believe that “currently, the Armenian film industry and Armenian culture in general are experiencing a deep crisis, and this applies not only to the quality of films produced and the ineffectiveness of film school education, but also, most importantly, to the tastes and receptivity of the audience. And since it is culture, art and science that are capable of counterbalancing the stereotypes of consumerist thinking, the main mission of the festival, film school and Filmadaran NGO is to promote educated, free-thinking citizens.”

According to the festival's founder and Filmadaran NGO president Garegin Zakoyan: “Only by coming into contact with the other do we grasp ourselves. By grasping ourselves we seek to understand and get to know the other and by understanding we start to sympathize with them. In contrast, the unknown and the unclear generate fear, distrust and enmity. Understanding the life, manners and traditions, struggles and experiences of other nations, tribes, social and religious groups – this is what "Apricot Tree” calls for and aspires to. And nothing can realize that aspiration better and more effectively, than “documentary” cinema, which lets the audience not only see, but also sympathize with the reality of the screen.”

== Program ==
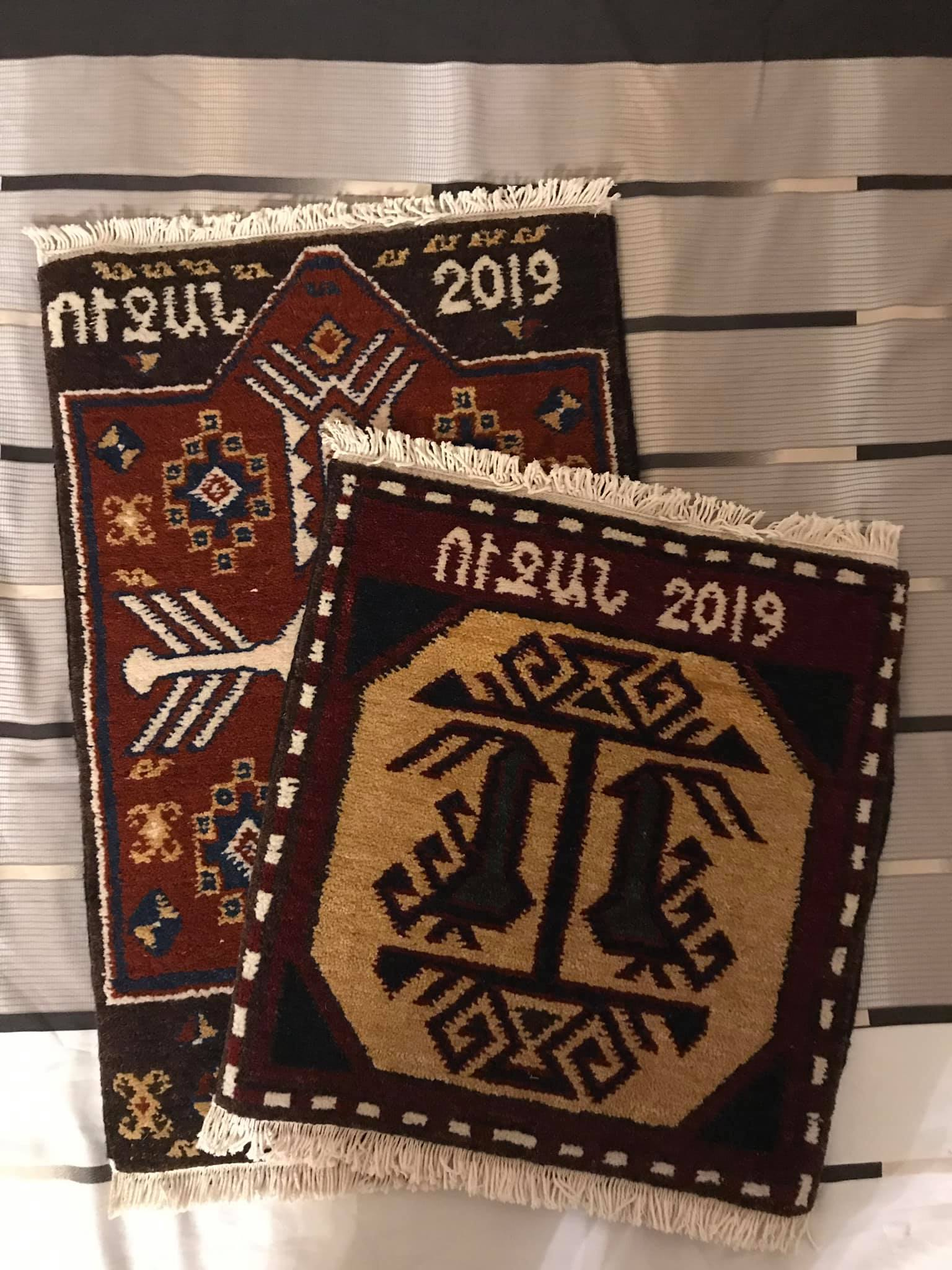
Apricot Tree IDFF prize carpets

In its early years, the festival mainly screened documentaries of an ethnographic or anthropological nature, but since 2017, Apricot Tree IDFF has expanded its format. Now, the festival programs include films of all non-fiction genres: ethnographic, anthropological, experimental, animated, and others. The program also periodically features films on the border between fiction and non-fiction. In 2021, Vardikyan said: “Our criteria has always been the high artistic value [of the film] and we try not to impose other restrictions. Often times we go out of the purely documentary format of our festival and include films, bordering the line between fiction and non-fiction.”

Each year, the festival screens 30-40 documentary non-fiction films from around the globe.

The festival program is made up of the following main sections:

- Feature-Length Film Competition (>45’)
- Short Film Competition (<45’)
- Non-competition section

The latter usually features thematic programs, retrospectives and tributes.

== Winners ==
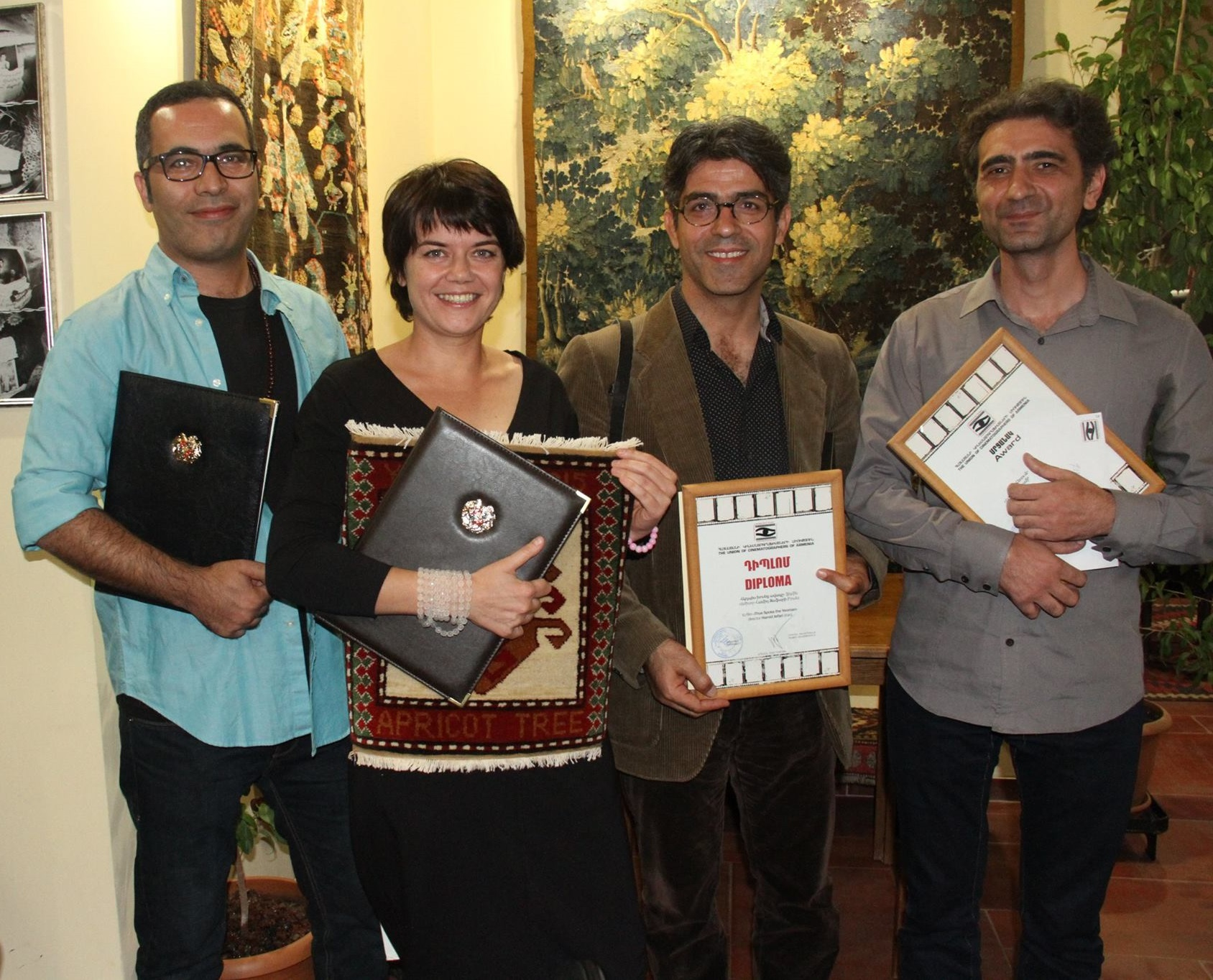
The winners of the very first edition of Apricot Tree Film Festival (2015)

== 2015 ==
Feature-length Competition

Grand Prize: Berlin Diary (Rosemarie Blank, Netherlands)

Special Jury Prize: Once Upon a Time (Turkey, Kazim Öz)

Short Docs Competition

Grand Prize: When I Am a Bird (Monika Pawluczuk, Poland)

Special Jury Prize: This is Tehran (Saeed Hadadi, Iran)

Union of Film Professionals of Armenia Special Prize

Thus Spoke the Yeoman (Hamid Jafari, Iran)

Far Away Close (Benjamin Gevorgyan, Armenia)

== 2016 ==
Feature-Length Competition

Grand Prize: May I Enter (Kostana Banovich, Netherlands)

Special Jury Prize: Habitat – Personal Notes (Emiliano Dante, Italy)

Short Docs Competition

Grand Prize: Holy God (Vladlena Sandu, Russia)

Special Jury Prize: The End of the World (Monika Pawluczuk, Poland)

Filmadaran NGO Special Prize

Carnival King of Europe (Giovanni Kezich/Michele Trentini)

Union of Film Professionals of Armenia Special Prize

Roots (Felice Fornabaio, Italy)

== 2017 ==
Feature-length Competition

Grand Prize: Slowly (Shahram Badakhshan Mehr, Iran, 2017)

Special Jury Prize: Planeta Petrila (Andrei Dascalescu, Romania, 2016)

Short Film Competition

Grand Prize: Siberian Ark (Pavel Skorobogatov, Russia, 2017)

Special Jury Prize: Once in Summer (Sirakan Abroyan, Armenia/ France/ Georgia, 2010)

Filmadaran NGO Special Prize

On the Kids’ Skin (Adriano Zecca, Italy, 2017)

Ujan Community Council Special Prize

node (Atsushi Koike, Japan/ Norway, 2010)

== 2018 ==
Feature-Length Competition

Grand Prize: Life is Be (Vakhtang Kuntsev-Gabashvili, Georgia, 2017)

Special Jury Prize: The Others (Ayşe Polat, Turkey/ Germany, 2016)

Short Docs Competition

Grand Prize: Meeting (Reza Majlesi, Iran, 2017)

Special Jury Prize: Bread for Bird (Alexandra Strelyanaya, Russia, 2010)

Filmadaran NGO Special Prize

Jean Rouch: An Adventurous Filmmaker (Laurent Védrine, France, 2017)

Ujan Community Council Special Prize

Great Siberian Rivers. Biryusa (Pavel Fattakhutdinov, Russia, 2014)

== 2019 ==
Feature-Length Competition

Grand Prize: Origines (Ashot Mkrtchyan, Armenia, 2016, 62’)

Special Jury Prize: Hopscotch (Dasha Demura, Belarus/ Russia, 2018, 54’)

Short Doc Competition

Grand Prize: Happy Today (Giulio Tonincelli, France/ Italy/ Uganda, 2017, 18’)

Special Jury Prize: Oymok (Kasiet Kubanychbek kyzy, Kyrgyzstan, 2017, 22’)

Special Mention: December (Arman Harutyunyan, Armenia, 2019, 23’)

Filmadaran NGO Special Prize

Workshop (Sergey Karandashov, Russia, 2018, 90’)

Ujan Community Council Special Prize

Beloved (Yaser Talebi, Iran, 2018, 54’)

Folk Arts Hub Foundation Special Prize

True Blue (Swati Dandekar, India, 2018, 68’)

Ethnogeographic Research Foundation Award

Birthday (Andrey Kiselev, Russia, 2019, 24')

== 2020 ==
Feature-Length Film Competition

Grand Prix. Sheep Hero (Ton van Zantvoort, Netherlands, 2018)

Special Jury Prize. The Fading Village (Liu Feifang, China, 2019)

Short Film Competition

Grand Prix. Asho (Jafar Najafi, Iran, 2019)

Special Jury Prize. Pain Is Mine (Farshid Akhlaghi, Australia, 2018)

Filmadaran NGO Special Prize

Lost Memory (Zlatina Rousseva, Bulgaria/ Belgium, 2020)

Ujan Community Council Special Prize

Feature-length film competition. Summa (Andrei Kutsila, Poland, 2018)

Short film competition. Come Again, Grandpa/ Who’s That Grandpa (Hovhannes Ishkhanyan, Armenia, 2018)

Folk Arts Hub Foundation Special Prize

Obon (Andre Hörmann/ Anna Samo, Germany/ Japan, 2018)

Martun Adoyan Special Prize

Acadiana (Guillaume Fournier/ Samuel Matteau/ Yannick Nolin, Canada, 2019)

== 2021 ==
Feature-Length Film Competition

Grand Prize: Elsewhere, Everywhere (Isabelle Ingold/ Vivianne Perelmuter, Belgium)

Special Jury Prize: Strip and War (Andrei Kutsila, Belarus/ Poland)

Short Film Competition

Grand Prize: Spirits and Rocks: an Azorean Myth (Aylin Gökmen, Switzerland/ Portugal)

Special Jury Prize: Balora (Abdulghader Khaledi, Iran)

Filmadaran NGO Special Prize

Feature-length competition: The Man Who Was Looking For His Son (Delphine Deloget/ Stephane Correa, France/ China)

Short Film Competition: Home (Smadar Epshtein Palgi, Israel)

Ujan Community Council Special Prize

Feature-length competition: When the Snow Melts Down (Alexey Golovkov, Russia)

Short film competition: The Imperial Lullaby (Filippo Foscarini/ Marta Violante, Italy)

Folk Arts Hub Foundation Special Prize

Cows on the Roof (Aldo Gugolz, Switzerland)

Martin Adoyan Award

Kal Fatemeh (Mehdi Zamanpour Kiasari, Iran)

== 2022 ==
Feature-length Competition

Grand Prize: Dark Red Forest (Jin Huaqing, China, 2021)

Special Jury Prize: Kash Kash (Lea Najjar, Lebanon/Germany/Qatar, 2020)

Short Film Competition

Grand Prize: Seven Symphonies of Zagros (Perwiz Rostemi, Iran/Kurdistan, 2021)

Special Jury Prize: Then Comes the Evening (Maja Novakovic, Serbia/Bosnia & Herzegovina, 2019)

Filmadaran NGO Special Prize

Feature-length Competition: Journey Into the Twilight (Augusto Contento, France/Italy, 2021)

Short Competition: Searching For Lost Armenia (Thu Anh Nguyen, Russia, 2022)

Ujan Community Council Special Prize

Feature-length Competition: Artavazd Pelechian. The Filmmaker Is a Cosmonaut (Vincent Sorrel, France, 2018)

Short Competition: You Can't Show My Face (Knutte Wester, Sweden, 2021)

Folk Arts Hub Foundation Award

Sone: (Daniel Kemeny, Switzerland, 2020)

Martun Adoyan Award

Terra Femme (Courtney Stephens, USA 2021)

Millenium Festival Special Award

Dark Red Forest (Jin Huaqing, China, 2021)

== 2023 ==
Feature-Length Competition

Grand Prize. The American Sector (Courtney Stephens/Pacho Velez, USA, 2021)

Special Jury Prize. And the King Said, What a Fantastic Machine (Axel Danielson/Maximilien Van Aertryck, Sweden/Denmark, 2023)

Short Films Competition

Grand Prize. Aqueronte (Manuel Muñoz Rivas, Spain, 2023)

Special Jury Prize. The Discoverer of the Discoverers (C.S. Nicholson, Norway, 2022)

Filmadaran NGO Special Prize

All You See (Niki Padidar, Netherlands, 2022)

Debet Village Prize

Where the Winds Die (Pejman Alipour, Iran, 2022)

Folk Arts Hub Foundation Prize

Devils of the Fields (Chiara Faggionato, Italy, 2019)

Martin Adoyan Special Prize

The Horse (Ashot Mkrtchyan, Armenia, 2022)

== 2024 ==
Feature-Length Competition

Grand Prix: La Base (Vadim Dumesh, France, 2023)

Special Jury Prize: Fire in the Mud (Catarina Laranjeiro/Daniel Barroca, Portugal, 2023)

Short Film Competition

Grand Prix: A Night Song (Félix Lamarche, Canada, 2022)

Special Jury Prize: Master of Loss (Giorgi Parkosadze, Georgia/Hungary/Belgium/Portugal, 2023)

Filmadaran Ngo Special Prize

Casablanca (Adriano Valerio, France/Italy, 2023)

Debed Village Prize

Ptitsa (Alina Maksimenko, Poland, 2022)

Folk Arts Hub Foundation Special Award

Luckless Lake (Faraz Fadaian, Iran, 2024)

Martun Adoyan Special Award

Only Godard (Arnaud Lambert/Vincent Sorrel, France, 2023)
