= Do Not Hesitate =

2021 Dutch film

- Theatrical release poster
- Directed by: Shariff Korver
- Written by: Jolein Laarman
- Produced by: Erik Glijnis; Emily Morgan; Leontine Petit
- Starring: Joes Brauers; Spencer Bogaert
- Cinematography: Nadim Carlsen
- Edited by: Ruben van der Hammen
- Music by: Juho Nurmela; Ella van der Woude
- Distributed by: September Film
- Release date: 14 June 2021
- Running time: 90 minutes
- Countries: Netherlands; Greece
- Languages: Dutch; English
- Box office: $40,562

Do Not Hesitate is a 2021 thriller film directed by Shariff Korver and written by Jolein Laarman. It premiered at the Tribeca Film Festival. The Dutch premiere took place at the Netherlands Film Festival and was followed by a nationwide release. It was selected as the Dutch entry for the Best International Feature Film at the 94th Academy Awards, but it was not nominated.

== Plot ==
Three young Dutch soldiers shoot a goat while guarding a truck in the middle of nowhere, during a mission in the Middle East. As stress and heat take their toll, they become increasingly disconnected to reality and their relationship with the young boy who is the goat's owner becomes more precarious, resulting in his death and their deep shock. They are rescued and recoup in Crete, where their drinking, dancing, crying and screaming is in contrast with their debrief, where nobody talks about how they feel.

== Cast ==
- Joes Brauers - Erik
- Spencer Bogaert - Roy
- Tobias Kersloot - Thomas
- Omar Alwan - Khalil

== Reception ==
Do Not Hesitate has an approval rating of 100% on review aggregator website Rotten Tomatoes, based on 5 reviews, and an average rating of 8.4/10.

== See also ==
- List of submissions to the 94th Academy Awards for Best International Feature Film
- List of Dutch submissions for the Academy Award for Best International Feature Film
