= Oysters at Nam Kee's =

- Theatrical release poster
- Directed by: Pollo de Pimentel
- Screenplay by: Hans de Wolf
- Based on: De oesters van Nam Kee by Kees van Beijnum
- Produced by: Hans de Weers; Hans de Wolf
- Starring: Katja Schuurman; Egbert Jan Weeber
- Cinematography: Danny Elsen
- Edited by: Peter Alderliesten
- Production companies: Egmond Film and Television; VARA
- Distributed by: United International Pictures
- Release date: 5 September 2002
- Running time: 92 minutes
- Country: Netherlands
- Language: Dutch
- Budget: € 2,2 million
- Box office: $919,629

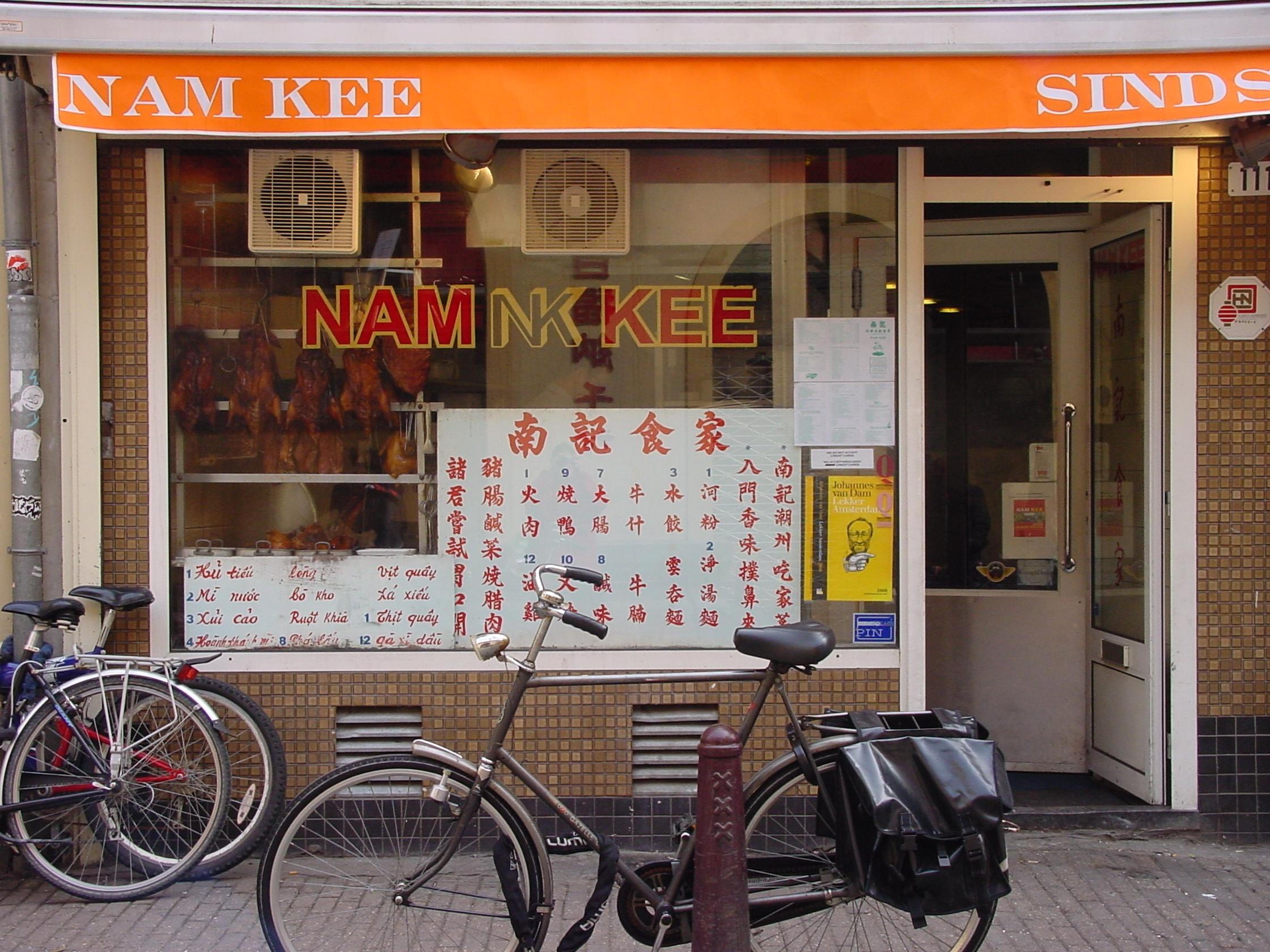
Nam Kee at the Zeedijk in Amsterdam

Oysters at Nam Kee's (Dutch: Oesters van Nam Kee) is a 2002 Dutch drama film, directed by Pollo de Pimentel, starring Katja Schuurman and Egbert Jan Weeber.

The film received a Golden Film (75,000 visitors) in 2002.

== Plot ==
Berry (Egbert Jan Weeber) is a boy who plays fast and loose and likes to hang around with his friends. One day he meets Thera (Katja Schuurman), a girl who's a little bit older, and she turns his head around. They start a romance culminating in a meetup at Nam Kee, a Chinese restaurant in Amsterdam where they have oysters for dinner. Suddenly Thera disappears and Berry becomes crazy of the silence and his unrequited love.

== Cast ==
- Katja Schuurman as Thera
- Egbert Jan Weeber as Berry Kooijman
- Johnny de Mol as Otto
- Edwin Jonker as Felicio
- Mohammed Chaara as Jamal
- Hans Dagelet as Mr. Kooijman, Berry's father
- Guusje Eijbers as Mrs. Kooijman, Berry's mother
- Cees Geel as Barber
