= Count Your Blessings (1987 film) =

1987 film

- Theatrical release poster
- Directed by: Pieter Verhoeff
- Written by: Pieter Verhoeff
- Based on: Van geluk gesproken 1982 novel by Marijke Höweler
- Produced by: Rob Houwer
- Starring: Mirjam Sternheim
- Cinematography: Paul van den Bos
- Edited by: Ot Louw
- Music by: Cees Bijlstra
- Production company: Verenigde Nederlandsche Filmcompagnie
- Distributed by: Cannon Tuschinski Film Distribution
- Release date: 19 November 1987
- Running time: 100 minutes
- Country: Netherlands
- Language: Dutch

Count Your Blessings (Dutch: Van geluk gesproken) is a 1987 Dutch comedy film directed by Pieter Verhoeff. The film was selected as the Dutch entry for the Best Foreign Language Film at the 60th Academy Awards, but was not accepted as a nominee.

== Cast ==
- Mirjam Sternheim as Martje Wilbrink
- Peter Tuinman as Leo de Zeeuw
- Geert de Jong as Rosa Leroy
- Marijke Veugelers as Karin de Bruin
- Michiel Romeyn as Harrie de Bruin
- Loudi Nijhoff as Moeder Kalk
- Aart Lamberts as Wouter Kalk

== See also ==
- List of submissions to the 60th Academy Awards for Best Foreign Language Film
- List of Dutch submissions for the Academy Award for Best Foreign Language Film
