= In for Treatment =

1979 film

- Directed by: Marja Kok; Erik van Zuylen
- Written by: Marja Kok
- Produced by: Het Werkteater
- Starring: Joop Admiraal
- Cinematography: Robby Müller
- Distributed by: VARA, Fugitive Cinema Holland
- Release date: 25 October 1979
- Running time: 92 minutes
- Country: Netherlands
- Language: Dutch

In for Treatment (Dutch: Opname) is a 1979 Dutch drama film directed by Marja Kok and Erik van Zuylen. It was created by members of the Dutch theater group Het Werkteater after two theater productions on the same theme of facing the prospect of death following a diagnosis remained in demand after hundreds of performances. The story is based on the experiences of the father of the lead actor Joop Admiraal.

The film was selected as the Dutch entry for the Best Foreign Language Film at the 53rd Academy Awards, but was not accepted as a nominee. It won the Bronze Leopard and Prize of the Ecumenical Jury at the Locarno International Film Festival in 1980.

== Cast ==
- Joop Admiraal as De Bruin
- Frank Groothof as Frank
- Marja Kok as Mrs. De Waal
- Hans Man in 't Veld as Dr. Hageman
- Daria Mohr as Anja Vonk
- Shireen Strooker as nurse
- Gerard Thoolen as male nurse
- Herman Vinck as Frank's father
- Helmert Woudenberg as Mr. De Waal
- Olga Zuiderhoek as nurse

== See also ==
- List of submissions to the 53rd Academy Awards for Best Foreign Language Film
- List of Dutch submissions for the Academy Award for Best Foreign Language Film
