= Alissa in Concert =

- Directed by: Erik van Zuylen
- Release date: October 5, 1990
- Running time: 75 minutes
- Country: Netherlands
- Language: Dutch

Alissa in Concert is a 1990 Dutch musical film directed by Erik van Zuylen.

== Cast ==
- Frances-Marie Uitti - Alissa
- Michael Matthews - Justice
- Pim Lambeau - Oude Dame
- Johan Leysen - Ziekenbroeder
- Hans Veerman - Huisbaas
