= Felix de Rooy =

Felix de Rooy (born Curaçao, 3 November 1952) is a poet, writer, dramatist, filmmaker, director, artist, and curator. In 1979, de Rooy was award the Cola Debrot Prize, the highest cultural award in the former Netherlands Antilles. In 1990, he won the Golden Calf for Ava & Gabriel.

== Education ==
After studying at the Vrije Akademie in The Hague, de Rooy received a Master of Arts in filming and directing at New York University in 1982.

== Filmography ==
- Gouden Kalf (Golden Kalf, Dutch Oscar) for oeuvre and importance for Dutch Filmculture (NFF, 2024)
- Nomade in Niemandsland (documentary about Felix de Rooy / director: Hester Jonkhout 2024) / Tangerine Films
- Buladó (fiction nominated for foreign Oscar) (2020, lead actor as opa Weljo / director: Eché Janga)
- Mundo Místiko (documentary about artist Tony Monsanto, 2018, director / camera & editor Kirk Claes) / NTR produkties
- Double Play (fiction, 2017, Curaçao, production designer / director: Ernest Dickerson (VS))
- The Renny Show (experimental film, 2015, Curaçao, director scenarist) / FishEye Feature Films
- Roest & Koraal (documentary about artist Ellen Spijkstra, 2013, Curaçao, director / camera & editor Kirk Claes)/ Fundanshon Bon Intenson
- Armand Baag (documentary about artist Armand Baag, 2013, Nederland, director) / MTNL
- Muhe Frida (short, 2011, Aruba, director) / Smaller Word Bigger Eye Productions[9]
- Island Reflections (promotion film Curaçao, 2011, Curaçao, director / camera & editor Kirk Claes) / government CUR
- Erfenis van Slavernij (documentary serie, 2006, Nederland, director) / Wereldmuseum Rotterdam
- Chess Game (korte film, 2005, Barbados, director/producer) / de Rooy / M. Patel
- Boy Écury (fiction, 2003, lead actor as Dundun Écury / director Frans Weisz)
- De D van Dag (short, 2003 actor as Poster Man)
- Marival (documentary 4 episodes, 1997, NL, director) / MTNL
- 4D for Thee (experimental film, 1995, NL, director) / de Rooy
- Footprints, 1991 series on visual arts productions episode on Felix de Rooij / Banyan
- Ava & Gabriel-Un historia di amor (fiction, 1990, Curaçao, director and production designer) / Cosmic Illushion (de Rooy/de Palm) - Gouden Kalf (Golden Kalf, Dutch Oscar) winner (1st people of color)
- Almacita di desolato (fiction, 1986, Curaçao, director and production designer) / Cosmic Illushion (de Rooy en de Palm)
- Desiree (speelfilm, 1984, NYC, director production designer) / Cosmic Illushion (de Rooy en de Palm)
- Joe's Bed-Stuy Barbershop: We Cut Heads (fiction, 1983, NYC, artdirector) / 40Acres and a Mule
- Tur Kos Bon Na New York (experimental film, 1981, NYC, director) / Illushón Kosmiko (de Rooy)
- Theresa (experimental film, 1979, Curaçao, director) / Illushón Kosmiko (de Rooy) (film lost)
- Duel in de Diepte (serie, 1979, Curaçao, actor as Lora, 9 episodes)
- Apo-Clypse (experimental film, 1979, Curaçao, director/scenarist) / Illushón Kosmiko (de Rooy)
- Musaiko Kultural (TV-film, 1979, Curaçao, director/scenarist /artistic director) / WT Productions
- Every Picture Tells a Story (experimental film, 1978, Curaçao, director/scenarist) / Illushón Kosmiko (de Rooy)
- Kharma na Korsow (filmic interview artistique experiment, 1975, Curaçao) / Wilbert E. Tecla en Felix de Rooy (film lost)
- Running 8/45 (experimental film, 1970, actor) / producer unknown (film lost)

The filmarchive and the Rights of De Rooy's films are transferred to the National Dutch film archive managed by EYE Filmmuseum Collection. Contact for his films and archive: Booking and/or Archival Loans at Eye Filmmuseum.
