= Buladó =

2020 Dutch adventure, drama film

Baludó
- Film poster
- Directed by: Eché Janga
- Written by: Eché Janga; Esther Duysker
- Produced by: Derk-Jan Warrink; Koji Nelissen
- Starring: Tiara Richards; Everon Jackson Hooi; Felix de Rooy
- Cinematography: Gregg Telussa
- Music by: Christiaan Verbeek
- Production company: Keplerfilm
- Release date: 2 October 2020 (Netherlands)
- Running time: 87 minutes
- Countries: Curaçao; Netherlands
- Language: Papiamento

Buladó is a 2020 Curaçaoan drama film directed by Eché Janga. The film premiered at Netherlands Film Festival on the 2 October 2020. The film won the Golden Calf for Best Feature Film award. It was selected as the Dutch entry for the Best International Feature Film at the 93rd Academy Awards, but it was not nominated. The story, laced with magic realism, follows headstrong 11-year-old girl Kenza who is determined to find her own path into adulthood, as she mourns her mom. She is torn between her agnostic father Ouira and her spiritual grandfather Weljo.

The film is produced by Derk-Jan Warrink and Koji Nelissen of Amsterdam-based Keplerfilm whose producing credits include The Lobster, Bullhead, Blind and Monos.

== Plot ==
Kenza lives with her father Ouira and grandfather Weljo on a car wrecking yard in the countryside of Curaçao. The two men are opposites that don’t particularly attract: Ouira is a determined and rational police officer, while Weljo identifies with the original inhabitants and spirituality of the island.

As Weljo wishes to prepare for his passing to the world of spirits, the relationship between Ouira and Weljo starts to escalate and Kenza searches for her own path in-between the two extremes. The down-to-earth and avoidant mentality of Ouira no longer offers her all that she needs and slowly she opens up to the more mystical and comforting traditions of her grandfather.

== Cast ==
- Tiara Richards as Kenza
- Everon Jackson Hooi as Ouira
- Felix de Rooy as Weljo

== Production ==
Principal photography began on 1 October 2019, and concluded on 16 November 2019. Filming took place in Band'abou, Klein Curacao Curaçao.

== See also ==
- List of submissions to the 93rd Academy Awards for Best International Feature Film
- List of Dutch submissions for the Academy Award for Best International Feature Film
