= The Dream (1985 film) =

1985 film

- Theatrical release poster
- Directed by: Pieter Verhoeff
- Written by: Pieter Verhoeff
- Starring: Peter Tuinman
- Cinematography: Paul van den Bos
- Edited by: Edgar Burcksen
- Distributed by: Cannon Tuschinski Film Distribution
- Release date: 3 September 1985
- Running time: 96 minutes
- Country: Netherlands
- Languages: Western Frisian, Dutch

The Dream (Western Frisian: De Dream; Dutch: De Droom) is a 1985 Dutch, mostly Western Frisian-language drama film directed by Pieter Verhoeff. The film was selected as the Dutch entry for the Best Foreign Language Film at the 58th Academy Awards, but was not accepted as a nominee.

== Cast ==
- Peter Tuinman as Wiebren Hogerhuis
- Huub Stapel as Inspecteur van politie
- Joke Tjalsma as Ymkje Jansma
- Freark Smink as Pieter Jelsma
- Hans Veerman as Commissaris van politie
- Adrian Brine as Officier van justitie
- Jan Arendsz as Allard Dijkstra

== See also ==
- List of submissions to the 58th Academy Awards for Best Foreign Language Film
- List of Dutch submissions for the Academy Award for Best Foreign Language Film
