= Memory Lane (2024 film) =

- Theatrical release poster
- Dutch: De terugreis
- Directed by: Jelle de Jonge
- Written by: Marijn de Wit; Jelle de Jonge
- Produced by: Maarten Kuit; Jeroen van den Idsert
- Starring: Martin van Waardenburg; Leny Breederveld
- Cinematography: Joris Kerbosch
- Edited by: Jurriaan van Nimwegen
- Music by: Steve Willaert
- Production company: Evangelische Omroep
- Distributed by: Dutch FilmWorks
- Release date: 21 March 2024 (Netherlands)
- Running time: 98 minutes
- Countries: Netherlands; Belgium
- Language: Dutch
- Box office: $2,689,985

Memory Lane (Dutch: De terugreis) is a 2024 comedy-drama film written by Marijn de Wit and co-written and directed by Jelle de Jonge. The film was a big box office hit in The Netherlands and was awarded the Golden Film. It was chosen as the Dutch entry for the Best International Feature Film at the 97th Academy Awards. The film won two Golden Calf awards for best feature film and best leading role for Leny Breederveld. The winners were announced at the Netherlands Film Festival.

The film finished in 5th place in the list of best visited Dutch films of 2024.

== Synopsis ==
Jaap has been together with Maartje for almost 50 years. While the grumpy Jaap is not very keen on doing things anymore, the sometimes slightly confused Maartje is still full of life. When the couple receives a letter from an old holiday friend, Jaap is reluctantly convinced to visit him in Southern Europe. The two travel in their old car through a completely changed Europe; bickering, but also recalling one memory after another. Along the way, Jaap realizes that his wife is suffering from dementia.

== Cast ==
- Leny Breederveld as Maartje
- Martin van Waardenberg as Jaap
- Janni Goslinga as Jolanda
- Trudy de Jong as Corry
- Paul R. Kooij as Peter
- Annemarie Prins as Jet

== See also ==
- List of submissions to the 97th Academy Awards for Best International Feature Film
- List of Dutch submissions for the Academy Award for Best International Feature Film
