= Parable (disambiguation) =

A parable is a figurative story.

Parable may also refer to:

== Music ==
- Parables (oratorio), Robert Aldridge 2010
- Parable, composition by Mark Bowden
- Parables, by Vincent Persichetti (1915-1987)
- Parables, album by Tarrus Riley 2006
- The Parable (album), a 2017 album by the Jimmy Chamberlin Complex
- "Parable", a 2019 song by Lagwagon from the album Railer

== Other uses ==
- The Parable (statue), a 1990 sculpture of a seated man in Washington DC
- Parable (film), a 1964 American short film
- Parables TV, a Christian streaming media service

== See also ==
- Parabola
