= De Matthäus Missie van Reindert de Leeuw =

De Matthäus Missie van Reinbert de Leeuw
- Directed by: Cherry Duyns
- Starring: Reinbert de Leeuw
- Release dates: 24 September 2016 (Netherlands Film Festival); 13 October 2016 (Netherlands)
- Running time: 75 minutes
- Country: Netherlands
- Language: Dutch

De Matthäus Missie van Reinbert de Leeuw is a 2016 Dutch Documentary film directed by Cherry Duyns. It documents how conductor Reinbert de Leeuw prepares for a concert of Johann Sebastian Bachs St Matthew Passion in the Nieuwe Kerk in Amsterdam. It was shortlisted by the EYE Film Institute Netherlands as one of the eight films to be selected as a potential Dutch submission for the Academy Award for Best Foreign Language Film at the 90th Academy Awards. However, it was not selected, with Layla M. being chosen as the Dutch entry instead.
