= Private Resistance =

1985 film

De IJssalon
- Theatrical release poster
- Directed by: Dimitri Frenkel Frank
- Written by: Dimitri Frenkel Frank
- Produced by: Roeland Kerbosch
- Starring: Gerard Thoolen; Renée Soutendijk; Bruno Ganz
- Cinematography: Theo van de Sande
- Edited by: Edgar Burcksen
- Distributed by: Tuschinski Film Distribution
- Release date: 24 January 1985
- Running time: 92 minutes
- Country: Netherlands
- Language: Dutch

Private Resistance (Dutch: De ijssalon, and also released as The Ice-Cream Parlour) is a 1985 Dutch drama film directed by Dimitri Frenkel Frank. The plot revolves around Otto's ice cream parlor, a microcosm of the Nazi invasion, Fascist Dutch bullies and anti-fascist groups. The film was entered into the 14th Moscow International Film Festival.

== Cast ==
- Gerard Thoolen as Otto Schneeweiss
- Bruno Ganz as Gustav
- Renée Soutendijk as Trudi
- Kees Hulst as Hans
- Carol van Herwijnen as Müller
- Gijs de Lange as Luuk
- Frits Lambrechts as NSB-partijbons
- Karin Bloemen as Carla
- Michiel Kerbosch as Brammetje
- Felix Jan Kuipers as Louis
- Alexander Van Heteren as Manteufel
