= Narcosis (film) =

2022 Dutch film directed by Martijn de Jong

- Film poster
- Directed by: Martijn de Jong
- Screenplay by: Laura van Dijk Martijn de Jong
- Produced by: Trent
- Starring: Thekla Reuten; Fedja van Huêt
- Cinematography: Martijn van Broekhuizen
- Edited by: Lot Rossmark
- Music by: Jorrit Kleijnen; Jacob Meijer
- Distributed by: September Film Distribution
- Release date: 20 October 2022
- Running time: 111 minutes
- Country: Netherlands
- Language: Dutch
- Budget: 1.8 million

Narcosis is a 2022 Dutch drama film directed and co-written by Martijn de Jong. The film won 3 Golden Calf. It was selected as the Dutch entry for the Best International Feature Film at the 95th Academy Awards, but it was not nominated.

== See also ==
- List of Dutch submissions for the Academy Award for Best Foreign Language Film
- List of submissions to the 95th Academy Awards for Best International Feature Film
