= Gerard Thoolen =

Dutch actor (1943–1996)

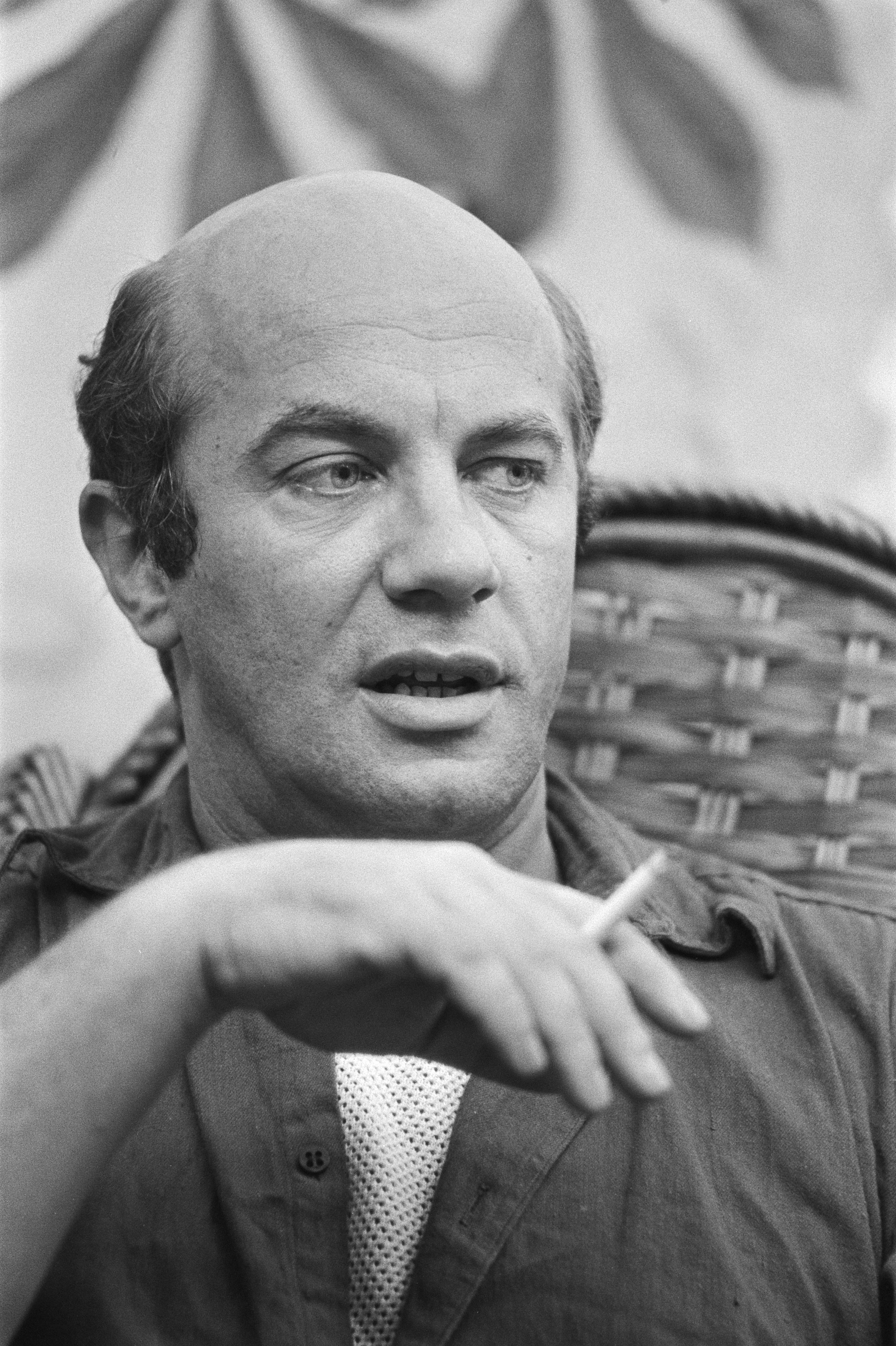
- Gerard Thoolen (1983)
- Born: Gerardus Bernardus Marie Cornelis Thoolen; 14 February 1943; Oss, Netherlands
- Died: 12 October 1996 (aged 53); Amsterdam, Netherlands
- Occupation: Actor
- Years active: 1969-1996

Gerardus Bernardus Marie Cornelis (Gerard) Thoolen (14 February 1943, in Oss – 12 October 1996, in Amsterdam) was a Dutch stage and film actor best known for his role in the film Private Resistance (1985).

== Career ==
Thoolen played his first leading role in 1980 in the filmThe Mark of the Beast by Pieter Verhoeff. Besides playing in Dutch films, Thoolen also participated in films by the British film director Peter Greenaway, A Zed & Two Noughts (1985) and Prospero's Books (1991).

== Awards ==
- 1984 Golden Calf (award) De mannetjesmaker
- 1984 Golden Calf (award) The Illusionist (1983 film)
- 1985 Best actor on the Taormina Film Fest for his role in Private Resistance
