= Paul van den Bos =

Dutch cinematographer

Paul van den Bos (born 1940) is a Dutch cinematographer.

After studying at the Instituut voor Kunstnijverheidsonderwijs in Amsterdam, he joined the studio of Ed van der Elsken. His credits as principal cinematographer include Hans: het leven voor de dood, Dagboek van een Oude Dwaas, and The Other End of the Tunnel, while he was assistant cinematographer for Soldier of Orange in 1977. He worked on many programs for the VPRO broadcasting organization and was the cameraman (often credited as Paul Pos) for the popular Van Kooten en De Bie television program for 28 years. He also worked extensively on documentaries.

He won the Newport Beach Film Festival Jury Award Best Cinematography for Nynke in 2002 and a Gouden Kalf nomination for Hollands licht.
