= Rafaël (film) =

2018 film

- Film poster
- Directed by: Ben Sombogaart
- Written by: Tijs van Marle; Massimo Gaudioso; Fabio Natale
- Based on: Rafaël by Christine Otten
- Starring: Mehdi Meskar
- Release date: 11 October 2018
- Running time: 105 minutes
- Countries: Netherlands; Belgium; Croatia
- Languages: Dutch; English; Arabic; Italian; French

Rafaël is a 2018 Dutch drama film directed by Ben Sombogaart. The film, shot in Croatia, is based on the book of the same name, written by Christine Otten. In July 2018, it was one of nine films shortlisted to be the Dutch entry for the Best Foreign Language Film at the 91st Academy Awards, but it was not selected.

== Cast ==
- Mehdi Meskar as Rafaël
- Melody Klaver as Kimmy
- Nabil Mallat as Nazir
