= Sheep Hero =

2018 film

- International release poster
- Directed by: Ton van Zantvoort
- Release date: 17 November 2018
- Running time: 81 minutes
- Countries: Netherlands; Romania
- Language: Dutch

Sheep Hero (Dutch: Schapenheld) is a 2018 Dutch-Romanian documentary film directed by Ton van Zantvoort. In July 2019, it was shortlisted as one of the nine films in contention to be the Dutch entry for the Academy Award for Best International Feature Film at the 92nd Academy Awards, but it was not selected.
