= Evenings (film) =

1989 film

- Theatrical release poster
- Directed by: Rudolf van den Berg
- Cinematography: Willy Stassen
- Edited by: Mario Steenbergen
- Music by: Bob Zimmerman
- Distributed by: Concorde Film
- Release date: 8 December 1989
- Running time: 122 minutes
- Country: Netherlands
- Language: Dutch

Evenings (Dutch: De Avonden) is a 1989 Dutch film directed by Rudolf van den Berg. It is based on the novel of the same title by Gerard Reve. The film was selected as the Dutch entry for the Best Foreign Language Film at the 63rd Academy Awards, but was not accepted as a nominee.

Leading roles were played by Thom Hoffman, Rijk de Gooyer and Pierre Bokma.

The film won two Golden Calf awards: best film, best actor (Thom Hoffman).

== Plot ==
The film follows Frits van Egters in the days before New Years 1947.

== Cast ==
- Thom Hoffman as Frits van Egters
- Rijk de Gooyer as Father
- Viviane de Muynck as Mother
- Pierre Bokma as Maurits

== See also ==
- List of submissions to the 63rd Academy Awards for Best Foreign Language Film
- List of Dutch submissions for the Academy Award for Best Foreign Language Film
