= The Illusionist (1983 film) =

- Theatrical release poster
- Directed by: Jos Stelling
- Written by: Freek de Jonge; Jos Stelling
- Produced by: Jos Stelling
- Cinematography: Theo van de Sande
- Edited by: Rimko Haanstra
- Music by: Willem Breuker
- Production company: Jos Stelling Filmprodukties
- Distributed by: Tushinski Film Distribution
- Release date: 6 October 1983
- Running time: 90 minutes
- Country: Netherlands

The Illusionist (Dutch: De illusionist) is a 1983 Dutch comedy film directed by Jos Stelling and starring Freek de Jonge. The film has no dialogue. It won the Golden Calf for Best Feature Film at the 1984 Netherlands Film Festival. The film was loosely based on a theater show by de Jonge called De Tragiek from 1980.

== Plot ==
It tells the story of a family with two sons. One of which is sent to a psychiatric hospital and the other looks for him there.

== Cast ==
- Freek de Jonge as the illusionist
- Jim van der Woude as brother
- Catrien Wolthuizen as mother
- Gerard Thoolen as father
- Carel Lapere as grandfather
- Craig Eubanks as magician
- Gerrie van der Klei as assistant
