= Kees van Beijnum =

Dutch writer (born 1954)

Kees van Beijnum

Kees van Beijnum (born 21 March 1954 in Amsterdam) is a Dutch writer. He grew up in Amsterdam, where his mother had a bar near the Zeedijk. Before he became a writer, he was a journalist. He made his debut as a novelist in 1991 with Over het IJ, a non-fiction novel about a murder case in Amsterdam.

The novel De ordening, published in 1998, was based on the life of Florentine Rost van Tonningen (1914–2007), a Dutch national-socialist who stood by her beliefs until her death. The book was adapted to film and was nominated for a Golden Calf award in 2003.

He received the Ferdinand Bordewijk Prijs in 2001 for De Oesters van Nam Kee ("Oysters at Nam Kee's"), which was also longlisted for the Libris Prize. The book was also made into a film as Oysters at Nam Kee's starring Katja Schuurman. Van Beijnum also changed publishers in 2001, moving from Nijgh & Van Ditmar to De Bezige Bij.

Van Beijnum also wrote the scenarios for De langste reis ('the longest travel', 1996), a movie about the kidnapping of businessman Gerrit Jan Heijn, and for De Heineken Ontvoering ('The Heineken Kidnapping', 2011), a movie about the kidnapping of Freddy Heineken.

== De Offers ==
De Offers (lit. The Sacrifices) was published on October 2, 2014. The book is a work of historical fiction about a Dutch judge who is sent to Japan to represent his country in the International Military Tribunal for the Far East. In the novel, the main character is named Rem Brink (as opposed to the real-life Dutch representative on the tribunal, Bert Röling), but the other judges are mentioned by their real names. In the week of its publication, Dutch daily newspaper NRC Handelsblad wrote that the book had caused a "commotion". Van Beijnum used diaries and letters provided to him confidentially by one of judge Röling's sons, the paper wrote. The source material was given to Van Beijnum to write a screenplay for the director Pieter Verhoeff. Judge Röling's son objected to the use of the material for a novel instead of a screenplay, as he was writing a biography of his father himself. He also objected to parts of the novel in which the main character visits brothels and eventually leaves a mistress behind with a child he fathered. Van Beijnum told the paper he constructed a fictional character and "maybe used some small bits" from the material ("a little book") provided to him by judge Röling's son. On December 14, 2014, another Dutch daily newspaper, De Volkskrant, named the controversy "the literary scandal of 2014", and revealed that the author made several changes to his book ahead of publication to accommodate the grievances of judge Röling's son. The paper also quotes director Pieter Verhoeff, who asked not to be thanked in the acknowledgements, stating that he "had contributed nothing whatsoever to the book". Judge Röling's son Hugo published the biographical account of his father's time at the tribunal as De rechter die geen ontzag had (lit. The judge who knew no reverence) on October 1, 2014.

== Bibliography ==
- 1991 Over het IJ ('Over the IJ', non-fiction novel)
- 1994 Hier zijn leeuwen ('There are lions here', novel)
- 1995 Dichter op de Zeedijk, ('Poet on the Zeedijk', novel, also made into a movie)
- 1998 De ordening, ('The ordering', novel, also made into a movie)
- 2000 De oesters van Nam Kee ("Oysters at Nam Kee's", novel, also made into a movie),
- 2002 De vrouw die alles had ('The woman that had everything', novel)
- 2004 Het verboden pad ('The forbidden path', novel)
- 2008 Paradiso (novel)
- 2010 Een soort familie ('A kind of family', novel)
- 2014 De Offers (novel)
