= Erik van Zuylen =

Dutch film director

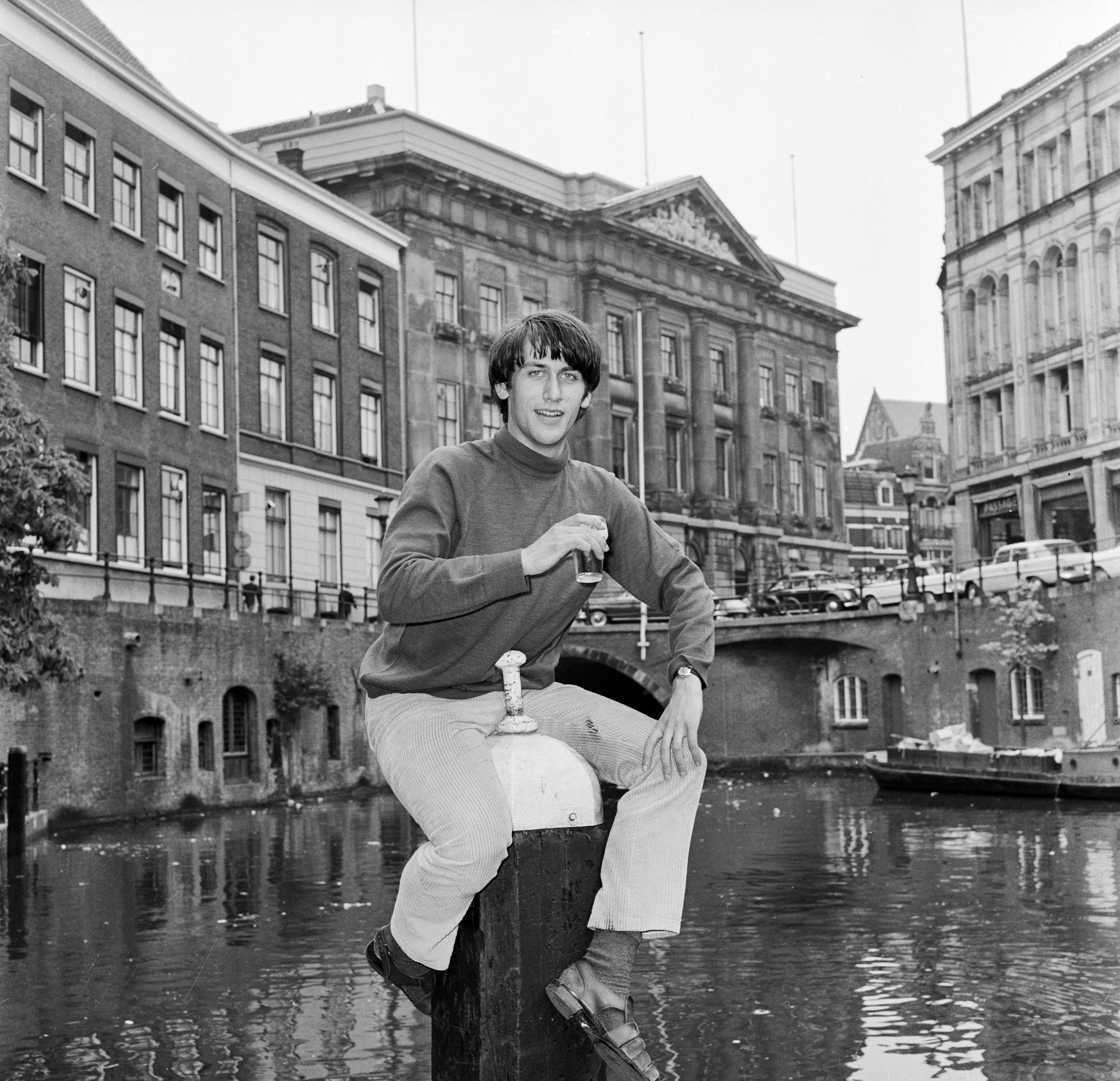
- Erik van Zuylen in Utrecht, 1967
- Born: 1943 (age 82–83); Utrecht, Netherlands
- Occupations: Film director, screenwriter
- Years active: 1975–2005

Erik van Zuylen (born 1943) is a retired Dutch film director and screenwriter. He has directed nine films between 1975 and 2005.

== Selected filmography ==
- In for Treatment (1979)
- Alissa in Concert (1990)
