= Marja Kok =

Dutch actress (born 1944)

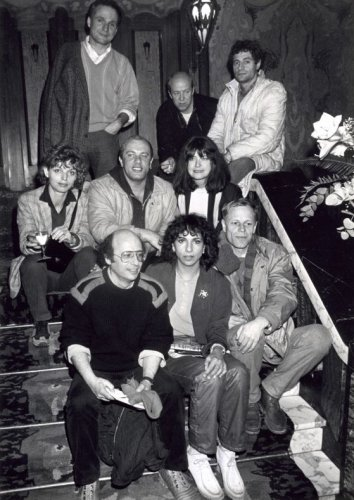
- Born: 29 June 1944 (age 81); Rotterdam, Netherlands
- Occupations: Actress, film director
- Years active: 1967-present

Marja Kok (born 29 June 1944) is a Dutch actress and film director. In 1981 she won the Golden Calf for Best Actress award. She has appeared in more than 25 films and television shows since 1967.

== Selected filmography ==
- In for Treatment (1979)
- Mates (1999)
