= The Moving True Story of a Woman Ahead of Her Time =

2001 film

Nynke
- Theatrical release poster
- Directed by: Pieter Verhoeff
- Written by: Pieter Verhoeff
- Produced by: Hans de Weers; Hans de Wolf
- Starring: Monic Hendrickx
- Cinematography: Paul van den Bos
- Edited by: Mario Steenbergen
- Music by: Cees Bijlstra
- Distributed by: United International Pictures
- Release date: 6 September 2001
- Running time: 110 minutes
- Country: Netherlands
- Languages: Frisian, Dutch

The Moving True Story of a Woman Ahead of Her Time (West Frisian title: Nynke) is a 2001 Dutch drama history film in the West Frisian language. It is a costume drama film about the life of Nienke van Hichtum and Dutch socialist and politician Pieter Jelles Troelstra. It is written and directed by Pieter Verhoeff.

The film received a Golden Film (75,000 visitors) and Platinum Film in 2001. It also won two Golden Calves. It was selected as the Dutch entry for the Best International Feature Film at the 74th Academy Awards, but it was not nominated.

== Plot ==
The film follows the life of Nynke from the time she first met Troelstra until their divorce.

== Cast ==
- Monic Hendrickx as Nienke van Hichtum
- Jeroen Willems as Pieter Jelles Troelstra
- Peter Tuinman as Father of Pieter Jelles
- Rients Gratama as Father of Nienke
- Carine Crutzen as Cornélie Huygens

== See also ==
- List of Dutch submissions for the Academy Award for Best Foreign Language Film
- List of submissions to the 74th Academy Awards for Best Foreign Language Film
