= Pieter Verhoeff =

Dutch film director (1938–2019)

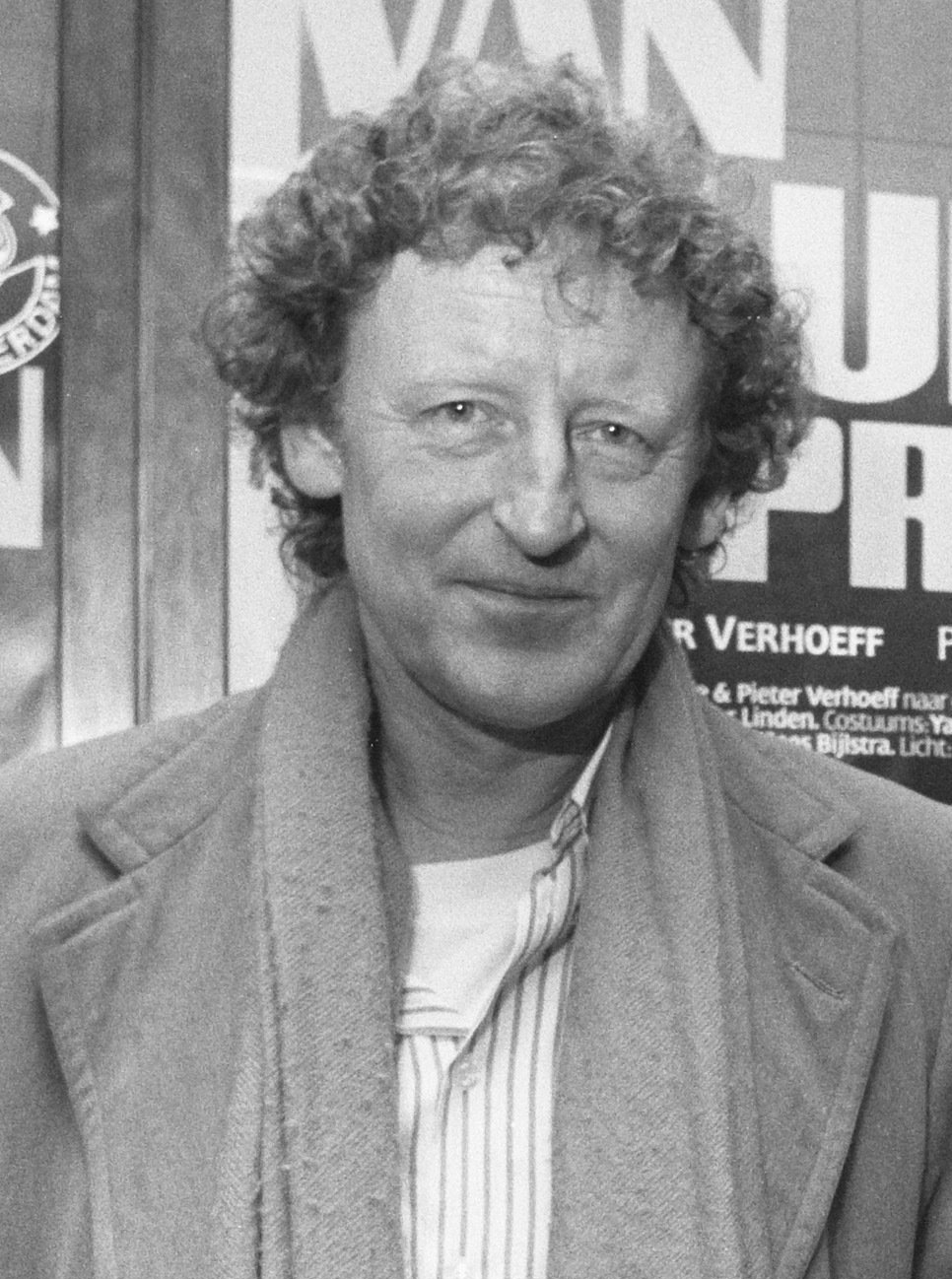
- Verhoeff in 1987
- Born: 4 February 1938; Lemmer, Netherlands
- Died: 17 April 2019 (aged 81); Amsterdam, Netherlands
- Occupation: Film director
- Years active: 1980–2019

Pieter Verhoeff (4 February 1938 – 17 April 2019) was a Dutch film director. He studied at the Netherlands Film and Television Academy and graduated in 1966. He is known for his films The Mark of the Beast, The Dream and The Moving True Story of a Woman Ahead of Her Time. All three stories take place in his native Friesland. He won two Golden Calf's in his career.

== Filmography ==
- The Mark of the Beast (Het teken van het beest) [1980]
- The Dream (De Dream) [1985]
- Count Your Blessings (Van geluk gesproken) [1987]
- The Sunday Child (De Zondagsjongen) [1992]
- The Longest Journey (De Langste Reis) [1997]
- Mates (Maten) [1999]
- The Moving True Story of a Woman Ahead of Her Time (Nynke) [2001]
- The Letter for the King (De Brief voor de Koning) [2008]
- Tokyo Trial [2017]
