= List of films set in Amsterdam =

Amsterdam has been a setting in Dutch and foreign films. The following is a list of films set in Amsterdam. The list includes a number of films which only have a tenuous connection to the city. The lists are sorted by the year the film was released.

== Dutch cinema ==
=== 1930s ===
- Pygmalion (1937 film) (1937), by Ludwig Berger

=== 1950s ===
- Ciske the Rat (1955 film) (1955), by Wolfgang Staudte

=== 1960s ===
- Makkers Staakt uw Wild Geraas (1960), by Fons Rademakers

=== 1970s ===
- Turkish Delight (1973 film) (1973), by Paul Verhoeven
- Keetje Tippel (1975), by Paul Verhoeven
- Soldier of Orange (1977), by Paul Verhoeven
- Cha Cha (film) (1979), by Herbert Curiel

=== 1980s ===
- The Lift (1983), by Dick Maas
- Ciske de Rat (1984 film) (1984), by Guido Pieters
- Amsterdamned (1988), by Dick Maas

=== 1990s ===
- False Light (1993), by Theo van Gogh
- Helicopter String Quartet (1996), by Frank Scheffer
- Siberia (1998), by Robert Jan Westdijk
- Suzy Q (1999), by Martin Koolhoven

=== 2000s ===
- Young Kees (2003), by André van Duren
- Simon (2004 film) (2004), by Eddy Terstall
- Wild Romance (film) (2006), by Jean van de Velde
- Black Book (film) (2006), by Paul Verhoeven
- Love Is All (2007 film) (2007), by Joram Lürsen
- Katia's Sister (2008), by Mijke de Jong

=== 2010s ===
- Sint (2010), by Dick Maas
- Süskind (film) (2012), by Rudolf van den Berg
- De wederopstanding van een klootzak (2013), by Guido van Driel
- The Dinner (2013 film) (2013), by Menno Meyjes
- Kidnapping Freddy Heineken (2015), by Daniel Alfredson
- Michiel de Ruyter (film) (2015), by Roel Reiné
- Layla M. (2016), by Mijke de Jong
- Prey (2016), by Dick Maas
- Riphagen: The Untouchable (2016), by Pieter Kuijpers
- My Foolish Heart (2018 film) (2018), by Rolf van Eijk
- Amsterdam Vice (2019), by Arne Toonen

=== 2020s ===
- The Host (2020), by Andy Newbery
- Ferry (2021), by Cecilia Verheyden
- My Best Friend Anne Frank (2021), by Ben Sombogaart
- Amsterdamned II (2025), by Dick Maas

== Foreign films set entirely or partially in Amsterdam ==
=== 1920s ===
- The Tragedy of a Great (1920), by Arthur Günsburg

=== 1930s ===
- Rembrandt (1936 film) (1936), by Alexander Korda
- The Children of Captain Grant (film) (1936), by Vladimir Vajnshtok
- Diamonds (1937 film) (1937), by Eduard von Borsody
- So You Don't Know Korff Yet? (1938), by Fritz Holl

=== 1940s ===
- Rembrandt (1942 film) (1942), by Hans Steinhoff
- But Not in Vain (1948), by Edmond T. Gréville

=== 1950s ===
- The Man Who Watched Trains Go By (1952), by Harold French
- Towers of Silence (film) (1952), by Hans Bertram
- Mr. Arkadin (1955), by Orson Welles
- The House of Intrigue (1956 film) (1956), by Duilio Coletti
- Operation Amsterdam (1959), by Michael McCarthy
- The Diary of Anne Frank (1959 film) (1959), by George Stevens

=== 1960s ===
- Final Destination: Red Lantern (1960), by Rudolf Jugert
- Girl in the Window (1961), by Luciano Emmer
- The Inspector (1962 film) (1962), by Philip Dunne
- The World's Most Beautiful Swindlers (1964), by Claude Chabrol, Jean-Luc Godard, Ugo Gregoretti, Hiromichi Horikawa, Roman Polanski
- Dateline Diamonds (1965), by Jeremy Summers
- Modesty Blaise (1966 film) (1966, by Joseph Losey
- Secret Agent Super Dragon (1966), by Giorgio Ferroni
- Amsterdam Affair (1968), by Gerry O'Hara
- The Limbo Line (1968), by Samuel Gallu
- The Magnificent Tony Carrera (1968), by José Antonio de la Loma
- If It's Tuesday, This Must Be Belgium (1969), by Mel Stuart

=== 1970s ===
- The Fifth Day of Peace (1970), by Giuliano Montaldo
- Puppet on a Chain (film) (1970), by Geoffrey Reeve, Don Sharp
- Diamonds Are Forever (film) (1971), by Guy Hamilton
- Commuter Husbands (1972), by Derek Ford
- I due gattoni a nove code... e mezza ad Amsterdam (1972), by Osvaldo Civirani
- The Little Ark (1972), by James B. Clark
- Alice in the Cities (1974), by Wim Wenders
- Sensations (film) (1975), by Lasse Braun
- Inside Out (1975 film) (1975), by Peter Duffell
- The Uranium Conspiracy (1978), by Gianfranco Baldanello, Menahem Golan
- Avalanche Express (1979), by Mark Robson

=== 1980s ===
- Rough Cut (1980 film) (1980), by Don Siegel
- Still Smokin (film) (1983), by Tommy Chong
- Hanna D. - The Girl from Vondel Park (1984), by Rino Di Silvestro, Bruno Mattei
- Dutch Girls (1985), by Giles Foster
- Caught (1987 film) (1987), by James F. Collier
- Dutch Treat (1987), by Boaz Davidson
- Hawks (film) (1988), by Robert Ellis Miller
- China White (film) (1989), by Ronny Yu

=== 1990s ===
- Look to the Sky (film) (1993), Roberto Faenza
- Young and Dangerous 3 (1996), by Andrew Lau
- Incognito (1997 film) (1997), by John Badham
- Do Not Disturb (1999 film) (1999), by Dick Maas
- Rembrandt (1999 film) (1999), by Charles Matton

=== 2000s ===
- The Discovery of Heaven (film) (2001), by Jeroen Krabbé
- The Invisible Circus (film) (2001), by Adam Brooks
- Bad Boys II (2003), by Michael Bay
- Girl with a Pearl Earring (film) (2003), by Peter Webber
- Headrush (2003), Shimmy Marcus
- EuroTrip (2004), by Jeff Schaffer
- Ocean's Twelve (2004), by Steven Soderbergh
- Layer Cake (2004), by Matthew Vaughn
- The Best Two Years (2004), by Scott S. Anderson
- Deuce Bigalow: European Gigolo (2005), by Mike Bigelow
- Hostel (2005 film) (2005), by Eli Roth
- Five Fingers (2006 film) (2006), by Laurence Malkin
- Nightwatching (2007), by Peter Greenaway
- Body of Lies (film) (2008), by Ridley Scott
- Harold & Kumar Escape from Guantanamo Bay (2008), by Jon Hurwitz, Hayden Schlossberg
- Nothing Personal (2009 film) (2009), by Urszula Antoniak

=== 2010s ===
- Bonded by Blood (2010), by Sacha Bennett
- Holy Rollers (film) (2010), by Kevin Asch
- Irvine Welsh's Ecstasy (2011), by Rob Heydon
- Amsterdam Heavy (2011), by Michael Wright
- Weekender (film) (2011), by Karl Golden
- St George's Day (film) (2012), by Frank Harper
- 10,000 Hours (film) (2013), by Joyce Bernal
- A Perfect Man (2013 film) (2013), by Kees Van Oostrum
- The Counselor (2013), by Ridley Scott
- The Fault in Our Stars (film) (2014), by Josh Boone
- Queen (2013 film) (2014), by Vikas Bahl
- Gangsterdam (2017), by Romain Lévy
- The Dinner (2017 film) (2017), by Oren Moverman
- The Hitman's Bodyguard (2017), by Patrick Hughes
- The 15:17 to Paris (2018), by Clint Eastwood
- The Hows of Us (2018), by Cathy Garcia-Molina
- The Spy Who Dumped Me (2018), by Susanna Fogel
- Domino (2019 film) (2019), by Brian De Palma
- The Goldfinch (film) (2019), by John Crowley

=== 2020s ===
- Trance (2020 film) (2020), by Anwar Rasheed
- Where Is Anne Frank (2021), by Ari Folman
- Amsterdam (2022 film) (2022), by David O. Russell
- Boronia Backpackers (2022), by Timothy Spanos
- Bawaal (2023), by Nitesh Tiwari
- Mission: Impossible – Dead Reckoning Part One (2023), by Christopher McQuarrie
- Occupied City (2023), by Steve McQueen

== See also ==
- Cinema of the Netherlands
- Lists of Dutch films

== Notes ==
1.Commuter Husbands (1972), by Derek Ford. This is a collection of 6 stories. The 5th story takes place in Amsterdam.
2.Girl with a Pearl Earring (film) (2003), by Peter Webber. This film is mostly shot in Delft, but some scenes are in Amsterdam such as Dam Square.
