= ShortCutz Amsterdam =

Annual film festival held in Amsterdam, the Netherlands

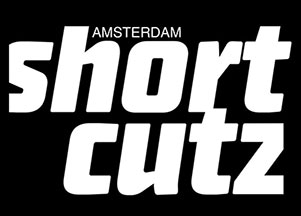
- ShortCutz Amsterdam logo
- Location: 1st floor, Kleine-Gartmanplantsoen 7-9 Amsterdam, Netherlands
- Founded: 2012
- Awards: Mr. Zee Award, Career Achievement Award
- Language: International
- Website: http://www.shortcutzamsterdam.com/

ShortCutz Amsterdam (ShortCutz AMS) is an annual film festival promoting short films in Amsterdam, Netherlands held the whole year through.

== Festival ==
ShortCutz Amsterdam is a film festival held the whole year through, promoting Dutch short films in The Netherlands. Every week has two short films competing. After the end of the calendar month the jury will select the winner of the month. The winner of the month is then nominated for a Mr. Zee Award and the winners will be presented at the end of January at the ShortCutz Amsterdam Annual Award Ceremony at EYE Film Institute Netherlands. Winners of the Mr. Zee award will receive funding for their next film project, special screenings in cinema's and a distribution deal.

A unique aspect of the festival is that jury members are encouraged to give their personal feedback on the selected films. Giving the filmmakers the opportunity to have professionals like Rutger Hauer, Jan Harlan or Eddy Terstall comment on their films. Because of the informal vibe of the festival jury members can often be spotted at the weekly screening sessions, lowering the bar for young creatives to come in contact with well-known film professionals.

=== Screening locations ===
The weekly screening sessions are held at the De Kring (The Circle), located in the heart of Amsterdam, on the corner of the Leidseplein. It is one of the main artists clubs of the city.

The ShortCutz Amsterdam Annual Awards Ceremony is held every January at the EYE Film Institute Netherlands. The EYE is a modern building located on the north bank of Amsterdam's waterfront, just behind the Central Station.

=== Mobile App ===
In 2019 the ShortCutz festival mobile app was released on Android and iOS. Giving mobile users an easy way to read about the news, weekly sessions and screening schedules. The app also gives the users the opportunity to connect with film professionals, upcoming talent and the film audience.

== Programmes ==
- The Official Selection
  - In Competition – Short films competing for the Mr. Zee Award. They are projected in De Kring Amsterdam.
  - Special Guests – Every session is accompanied by an influential guest from the film industry and will hold an open Q&A.
  - ShortCutz Amsterdam Award Ceremony – Awards presentation honoring the best talent in short-film achievements.
- Events
  - Best of ShortCutz – Special selection of the best of films.
  - Marathon of New Dutch Cinema – In one night, it showcases the vitality and diversity of short films.
  - Shortcutz National Audience Awards.

== Juries ==
The jury composed of an ambassador and various film directors, actors, culture, and art personalities, determine the prizes for the best short films in the competition. The juries hold the responsibility for choosing the monthly winner and which films will receive a Mr. Zee award.

Notable jury members: Waldemar Torenstra, George Sluizer, Laser 3.14, Tygo Gernandt, Hanna Verboom, Mijke de Jong, Roel Reiné, Eddy Terstall, Ariane Schluter, Rutger Hauer, Jan Harlan, Willeke van Ammelrooy, Pieter Kuijpers.

== Guests of honor ==
Every year guests of honor are invited to speak about their experiences in film creation.

List of Guests of Honor:

- (2016) Rutger Hauer – actor extraordinaire (Blade Runner, Batman Begins)
- (2016), (2017) Jan Harlan – producer of the late Stanley Kubrick (Full Metal Jacket, The Shining, Eyes Wide Shut) and Steven Spielberg's A.I. Artificial Intelligence
- (2016) Béla Tarr - cult film director (The Turin Horse, Werckmeister Harmonie)
- (2016) Leontine Petit – producer and founder of Lemming Film (The Lobster, Full Contact)
- (2016) Pieter Verhoeff – Golden Calf winning director (Nynke, De brief voor de koning)
- (2016) Job Roggeveen from the studio Job Joris & Marieke – Oscar nominee animator (A Single Life, Otto)
- (2016) Claire van Daal - Nederlands Film Festival programmer
- (2016) Jan Doense aka Mr Horror - producer, publisher (de FilmKrant), Festival Organizer (founder: Amsterdamned & Imagine Film Festival).
- (2016) Jos de Putter - documentary maker and producer (See No Evil, Radio Kobani)
- (2016) Yorick van Wageningen - actor (The Girl with the Dragon Tattoo, Winter in Wartime)
- (2016) Sigrid ten Napel - golden calf nominee actress (Prince, Penoza)
- (2017) Bero Beyer - IFFR director and producer (Atlantic, Paradise Now)
- (2017) Willeke van Ammelrooy - actress (Antonia, the Lift, Ciske de Rat)
- (2017) Johanna Ter Steege - actress (Spoorloos, Paradise Road)
- (2017) Marc van Warmerdam - producer (A gentle Creature, Borgman)
- (2017) Ate de Jong - director (Highway to Hell, Drop Dead Fred)
- (2017) Mae Dols de Jong - director (If Mama Ain't Happy, Nobody's Happy, Nettiquette)
- (2017) Gareth Wiley - producer (Match Point, Vicky Cristina Barcelona)

== Awards ==
=== Career Achievement Award ===
The Career Achievement Award has been awarded since 2013. The winners are: 2018 – Frans Weisz, 2017 – Heddy Honigmann, 2016 – Pieter Kuijpers, 2015 – Rutger Hauer, 2014 – Jos Stelling and 2013 – George Sluizer.

=== Rutger Hauer Award ===
The Career Achievement Award was transformed into the Rutger Hauer Award after his death in 2019. The winners are: 2022 - Junkie XL, 2021 - Martin Koolhoven, 2020 - NTR Kort! (Marina Blok), 2019 - Paul Verhoeven

=== Mr. Zee Award winners ===
The Mr. Zee Award has various sponsors, including ShortsTV, Camalot Amsterdam, Filmmore and EYE Film Institute Netherlands. The Mr. Zee awards are made by ProtoSpace.

=== Singular Awards ===
In some years a singular award has been awarded.

In 2020 an awards for Best Music video was awarded to Leo Cosme for his music video for the artist Feng Sueve with his song Half-Moon bag.

in 2020 an Xite award was awarded to Timo Ottevanger for his music video for Sunnery James and Ryan Marciano - Let it lie

in 2022 an award for best soundtrack, chosen by Mimm / Private Kitchen was awarded to Giliam Spliethoff & Jorick Bronius for the film You can't Automate Me.

Mr Zee Best Film

Year	Film	Original Title	Director	Other Nominees	Jury
2013	Wednesdays	Woensdagen	Aaron Rookus	12th of never (Fadi Hindash), Drag Junkie (Gabriel M. Bauer), Flirt (Gabriel M. Bauer), Kruidwoord (Sander van Dijk), Stardust (Mischa Rozema), Tombed (Jeffrey Schreuders, Elian van der Heiden)	
2014	Pony Place	Pony Place	Joost Reijmers	De leeuw (Klaas Arie Westland), Geen Klote! (Melvin Simons, Jon Karthaus), Happy New Year (Simon Dymond), Peace and Quiet (Niels Bourgonje)	
2015	Ballen	Ballen	Janne Schmidt	Bam (Dennis Overeen), Groen (Lucas Camps), Plaster (Jeroen Houben), Expose (Moniek van der Knallen)	Eddy Terstall, Jan Harlan, Laser 3.14, Roel Reiné, René Wolf, Tygo Gernandt, Vincent van Ommen, Claire van Daal, Harmen Jalvingh, Ariane Schluter, Jeroen Koolbergen, Jan Doense
2016	Nymphet	Nymphet	Laura Hermanides	Beautiful woman (Diego Nurse), Bingo! (Patrick Schoenmaker), Exist (Klaas Arie Westland), Jimmy on the Run (Wytse Koetse), Platform 13 (Camiel Zwart), Ticking Away (Michael Sewnarain)	Rutger Hauer, Eddy Terstall, Jan Harlan, Laser 3.14, Roel Reiné, René Wolf, Tygo Gernandt, Vincent van Ommen, Claire van Daal, Harmen Jalvingh, Ariane Schluter, Jeroen Koolbergen, Jan Doense,
2017	A man falls from the sky	Valt een man uit de lucht	Kurt Platvoet, Jan Verdijk	I was only 14 (Froukje van Wengerden), Che! (Elsbeth Fraanje), Tabook (Dario Van Vree ), Bridge (Niels Bourgonje), Routine (Fokke Mars), Skogafoss (Niels Bourgonje)	Rutger Hauer, Eddy Terstall, Jan Harlan, Laser 3.14, Marina Blok, Roel Reiné, René Wolf, Tygo Gernandt, Willeke van Amelrooy, Pieter Kuijpers, Vincent van Ommen, Claire van Daal, Harmen Jalvingh
2018	Bullet Time	Bullet Time	Frodo Kuipers	Sjaak's wife died, so he needs to say something (Eva M. C. Zanen), Girl on a mission (Eva van Barneveld, Heleen D'Haens), Otherland (Jan Pieter Tuinstra), Hitchock Hitchcock (Edgar Kapp, Kuba Szutkowski), Spark (Dominique Michelle Gimberg), Happy new year (Brandon Grötzinger, Wander Theunis)	Rutger Hauer, Hany Abu-Assad, Eddy Terstall, Jan Harlan, Laser 3.14, Marina Blok, Roel Reiné, René Wolf, Sigrid Ten Napel, Tygo Gernandt, Willeke van Amelrooy, Pieter Kuijpers, Vincent van Ommen, Claire van Daal
2019	School's Out	Tienminutengesprek	Jamille van Wijngaarden	Accident (David Cocheret), At First Sight (Sjaak Rood), Crow's Nest (Flynn von Kleist), Daydreaming (Yim Brakel), Fundament (Wilbert van Veldhuizen), Nobu (Sarah Blok, Lisa Konno)	Hany Abu-Assad, Eddy Terstall, Jan Harlan, Laser 3.14, Marina Blok, Roel Reiné, René Wolf, Sigrid Ten Napel, Tygo Gernandt, Willeke van Amelrooy, Kim Sherman, Pieter Kuijpers, Vincent van Ommen, Parwin Mirrahimy
2020	Short Calf Muscle	Korte kuitspier	Victoria Warmerdam	En Route (Marit Weerheijm), Life at Oranjehotel (Mark Visser, Jeroen Schellekens), Lili (Yfke van Berckelaer), Mania (Edson da Conceicao), No dog in Amsterdam (lucas Camps), Re-Entry (Ben Brand)	Christopher Mack, Hany Abu-Assad, Eddy Terstall, Jan Harlan, Laser 3.14, Marina Blok, Roel Reiné, René Wolf, Sigrid Ten Napel, Tygo Gernandt, Willeke van Amelrooy
2021	Free Fall	Free Fall	Emmanuel Tenenbaum	Birdland (Ashgan El-Hamus, Camouflage (Remco Polman, Jantiene de Kroon), Last Ride (Edson da Conceicao), Marlon Brando (Vincent Tilanus), Shielded (Jan Verdijk), Wall #4 (Lucas Camps)	Charles Mastro Pietro, Christopher Mack, Hany Abu-Assad, Eddy Terstall, Jany Temime, Jan Harlan, Laser 3.14, Marina Blok, Roel Reiné, René Wolf, Sigrid Ten Napel, Willeke van Amelrooy
2022	Spotless	Vlekkeloos	Emma Branderhorst	Cage (Rumi Kaul), Funkele (Nicole Jachmann), In between glass and walls (Razan Hassan), Science around us (ARIV), The Smile (Erik van Schaaik), What killed Timmy Benson (Nick Cremers)	Antonio D'intino, Christopher Mack, Eddy Terstall, Elise Schaap, Jan Harlan, Laser 3.14, Marina Blok, Nora El-Koussour, Roel Reiné, René Wolf, Sigrid Ten Napel, Willeke van Amelrooy
2023	I'm Not a Robot	Ik Ben Geen Robot	Victoria Warmerdam	A capella in D minor (Malu Janssen), Fly (Patty Stenger), Jammed (Isis Cabolet), Gnomes (Ruwan Heggelman), New Babylon (Gideon van der Stelt)	Christopher Mack, Eddy Terstall, Elise Schaap, Jan Harlan, Marina Blok, Nora El Koussour, Laser 3.14, René Wolf, Roel Reiné, Willeke van Amelrooy

Mr Zee Audience Award
Year	Film	Original title	Director	Other Nominees
2015	Expose	Expose	Moniek van der Knallen	Bam (Dennis Overeen), Groen (Lucas Camps), Plaster (Jeroen Houben), Wednesdays (Aaron Rookus)
2016	Jimmy on the run	Jimmy on the run	Wytse Koetse	Beautiful Woman (Diego Nurse), Bingo! (Patrick Schoenmaker), Excist (Klaas Arie Westland), Nymphet (Laura Hermanides), Platform 13 (Camiel Zwart), Ticking Away (Michael Sewnarain)
2017	A man falls from the sky	Valt een man uit de lucht	Jan Verdijk & Kurt Platvoet	Beautiful woman (Diego Nurse), Bingo! (Patrick Schoenmaker), Exist (Klaas Arie Westland), Jimmy on the Run (Wytse Koetse), Platform 13 (Camiel Zwart), Ticking Away (Michael Sewnarain)
2018	Happy New Year	Happy New Year	Brandon Grötzinger & Wander Theunis	Bullet Time (Frodo Kuipers) Sjaak's wife died, so he needs to say something (Eva M. C. Zanen), Girl on a mission (Eva van Barneveld, Heleen D'Haens), Otherland (Jan Pieter Tuinstra, Hitchock Hitchcock (Edgar Kapp, Kuba Szutkowski), Spark (Dominique Michelle Gimberg)
2019	School's Out	Tienminutengesprek	Jamille van Wijngaarden	Accident (David Cocheret), At First Sight (Sjaak Rood), Crow's Nest (Flynn von Kleist), Daydreaming (Yim Brakel), Fundament (Wilbert van Veldhuizen), Nobu (Sarah Blok, Lisa Konno)
2020	En Route	En Route	Marit Weerheijm	Life at Oranjehotel (Mark Visser, Jeroen Schellekens), Lili (Yfke van Berckelaer), Mania (Edson da Conceicao), No dog in Amsterdam (lucas Camps), Re-Entry (Ben Brand), Short Calf Muscle (Victoria Warmerdam)
2021	Free Fall	Free Fall	Emmanuel Tenenbaum	Birdland (Ashgan El-Hamus, Camouflage (Remco Polman, Jantiene de Kroon), Last Ride (Edson da Conceicao), Marlon Brando (Vincent Tilanus), Shielded (Jan Verdijk), Wall #4 (Lucas Camps)
2022	Spotless	Vlekkeloos	Emma Branderhorst	Cage (Rumi Kaul), Funkele (Nicole Jachmann), In between glass and walls (Razan Hassan), Science around us (ARIV), The Smile (Erik van Schaaik), What killed Timmy Benson (Nick Cremers)
2023	Jammed	Gleuf	Isis Cabolet	A capella in D minor (Malu Janssen), Fly (Patty Stenger) Gnomes (Ruwan Heggelman), New Babylon (Gideon van der Stelt)

Mr. Zee Best Director
Year	Director	Film	Other Nominees
2013	Aaron Rookus	Wednesdays	Fadi Hindash (12th of never), Gabriel M. Bauer (Drag Junky), Jeroen Houben (Sorry),
2014	Ben Brand	97%	Joost Reijmers (Pony Place), Klaas Arie Westland (De Leeuw), Kurt Platvoets (Een verre reis)
2015	Janne Schmidt	Ballen	Jeroen Houben (Plaster)
2016	Laura Hermanides	Nymphet	Jordi Wijnalda (Gilles), Klaas Arie Westland (Exist), Marc de Leeuw (Copyrette)
2017	Kurt Platvoet, Jan Verdijk	A man falls from the sky	Elsbeth Fraanje (Che!), Niels Bourgonje (Skogafoss), Nils Vleugels (Labor)
2018	Daphne Luckers	Sisters	Brandon Grötzinger & Wander Theunis (Happy new year), Dominique Gimberg (Spark), Eva M. C. Zanen (Sjaak's wife died, so he has to say something), Shady El-Hamus (Nightshade)
2019	Flynn von Kleist	Crow's Nest	Guust Mulder (Alaraph), Jamille van Wijngaarden (School's out), Michael Middelkoop (Snor), Nico van den Brink (The Burden)
2020	Marit Weerheijm	En Route	Jörgen Scholtens (Cuckoo!), Victoria Warmerdam (Short calf muscle), Mania (Edson da Conceicao), Arjan Brentjes (Sad Beauty), Re-Entry (Ben Brand)
2021	Emmanuel Tenenbaum	Free Fall	Ashgan El-Hamus (Birdland), Jantiene de Kroon & Remco Polman (Camouflage), Vincent Tilanus (Marlon Brando), Jan Verdijk (Shielded), Festus Toll (When you hear the divine call)
2022	Nicole Jachmann	Funkele	Emma Brandenhorst (Spotless), Idriss Nabil (Revelinho), Kees-Jan Mulder (Nudes), Naomi Pacifique (After a room), Razan Hassan (Between Glass and Walls)
2023	Malu Janssen	A Capella in D Minor	Claire Zhou (The Performance), Isis Cabolet (Jammed), Ruwan Heggelman (Gnomes), Victoria Warmerdam (I'm not a robot)

Mr Zee Best Actor
Year	Actor	Film	Other nominees
2013	Daniël Cornelissen	Flirt	Hugo Konings (Drag Junkie), John Buijsman (Sorry), Nasrdin Dchar (Sorry), Sergio Simbula (Zwart, met suiker)
2014	Bert Hana	97%	
2015	Bram Suiker	Ballen	Dennis Overeem (Aline), Gene Bervoets (Home Suite Home)
2016	Mattias van de Vijver	Gilles	Daniel Cornelissen (Buddy), Saman Amini (Night Shift), Sofiene Mamdi (Gilles), Sol Vinken (Game Night)
2017	Jacqueline Blom	A man Falls from the sky	Amélie Bernard (Two Dollars), Ilke Paddenburg (Sweet Tooth), Jun Jun Liang (Ghost)
2018	Tine Cartuyvels	Happy New Year	Bente Fokkens (Spark) Eefje Paddenburg (Spark), Fabienne Leenart (90 Degrees), Lisa Smit (All the single ladies!)
2019	Yfendo van Praag	Crow's Nest	Huub Smit (Hold On), Jord Knotter (Downward Facing Dogs), Leonard van Herwijnen (Nest), Theo Wesselo (Snor), Wouter Hendrickx (Wild)

Mr Zee Best Actress
Year	Actress	Film	Other Nominees
2013	Petra Laseur	Viskom	Joke Bruijs (Sorry), Loek Beernink (Closing Time), Nienke Gravemake (Exorsister), Sophie van Winden (Rood)
2014	Carine Crutzen	Southwest	Bien de Moor (Reizigers in de nacht)
2015	Saadet Yuce	Before We Lose	Annemieke Bakker (Bam), Hanneke Scholten (Camouflage), Thekla Reuten (Home Suite Home)
2016	Alix Jana Cale	Nymphet	Albertine de Kanter (Game Night), Hanneke Scholten (Gotta), Juul Vrijdag (Deadwood), Selma Copijn (Night Shift)
2017	Raymond Thiry	A man falls from the sky	Bart Slegers (Pensionado), Hans Dagelet (Salvatore), Yannick Jozefzoon (Netflix & Chill)
2018	Kubilay Sengul	Nightshade	Benjamin Moen (Pizzamonster), Mustafa Duygulu (Nightshade), Sabri Saddik (Final Stop), Sjeng Kessels (Lone Wolf)
2019	Raymonde de Kuyper	School's Out	Christine van Stralen (A normal life), Gonny Gaakeer (Kraut Girl), Melody Klaver (Downward Facing Dogs), Romana Vrede (Crow's Nest), Sara Luna Zoric (Yulia & Juliet)

Mr Zee Best Acting
Year	Actor	Film	Other Nominees
2020	Henry Van Loon	Short Calf Muscle	Lotte Verbeek (Meeting the other woman), Ilker Delikaya & Sih Ali Yalciner (Atilla), Ali Fardi (Only death never lies), Masali Baduza (The Fighter), Lisa Smit (lili)
2021	Sam Boekaar	Melanie	Abraham Lewis (Free Fall), Sanne Maas (I'd like to thank), Tijn Winters & Jetske Lieber (Marlon Brando), Lieke Witteveen (Outcome), Zoë Love Smith & Nora El Koussour (Stuckwithu), Sallie Harmsen (The Departure)
2022	Maike Meijer	Housemaid #2	Alicia Prinsen (Spotless), ARIV (Science Around Us), Jack Wouterse (Shut), Jashayra Oehlers (Donna), Moussaab Mahyu (Cage)
2023	Ellen Parren	I'M Not a Robot	Eline Havelaar (Amy & I), Juliette van Ardenne (Gush), Lesley Wang (The Performance), Mikky Dijkstra (When the beat drops), Rami Kooti Arab (At a glance), Romana Vrede (Hannah), Sieger Sloot (Table 8)

Mr. Zee Best Screenplay
Year	Writer	Film	Other Nominees
2013	Jeroen Houben	Sorry	Fadi Hindash (12th of Never), Matthijs Bockting (Naar het einde van de straat), Aaron Rookus (Wednesdays)
2014	-	-	-
2015	Paul Bontenbal	Ballen	Cristhian Andrews & Ruya Koman (Before we lose), Lucas Camps (Groen)
2016	Wander Theunis & Ashar Medina	Gilles	Jan van Gorkum (Game night), Karsten de Vreugd (Route du soleil), Lucas Camps (Deadwood)
2017	Jan Verdijk & Kurt Platvoet	A man falls from the sky	Martijn Winkler (#Tagged), Nils Vleugels (Labor), Bastiaan Tichler (Skogafoss), Nico van den Brink (Sweet tooth)
2018	Brandon Götzinger & Wander Theunis	Happy New Year	Rudi Brekelmans & Frodo Kuipers & Merlijn Passier (Bullet Time), Jeroen Scholten van Aschat (Nightshade), Sisters (Rosita Wolkers), Medi Broekman (Sjaak's wife dies, so he has to say something)
2019	Renske de Greef	School's Out	Jeroen Scholten van Aschat (Crow's nest), Karsten de Vreugd (Downward facing dogs), Michael Middelkoop (Snor), Paul de Vrijer (Accident)
2020	Marit Weerheijm	En Route	Pepijn van Weeren & Jorgen Scholtens (Cuckoo!), Victoria Warmerdam (Short calf muscle), Alkan Coklu (Atilla), Andy Weir & Ben Brand (Re-entry)
2021	Guillaume Fournier & Emmanuel Tenenbaum	Free Fall	Ashgan El-Hamus (Birdland), Jantiene de Kroon & Remco Polman (Camouflage), Vincent Tilanus (Marlon Brando), Jan Verdijk (Shielded), Lucas Camps (Wall #4)
2022	Milou Rhode	Spotless	ARIV & Tommaso Genovesi (Science around us), Demian van der Wekken & Ruma Kaul (Cage), Erik van Schaaik (The Smile), Jan van Gorkum (Shiny new world), Pepe Favela (Revelinho)
2023	Victoria Warmerdam	I'M Not a Robot	Amy Janna (When the beat drops), Caspar van Woudenberg (A capella in d mineur), Claire Zhou (The Performance), Jan-Kees Joosse (This is your captain speaking)

Mr Zee Best Animation
Year	Film	Director	Other Nominees
2013	Tombed	Jeffrey Schreuders & Elian van der Heiden	Tired of Swimming (Anna Eijsbouts)
2014	-	-	-
2015	Facing the News	Wiep Teeuwisse	-
2016	Ticking Away	Michael Sewnarain	A City of Rust (Omar El Araby), Bingo! (Patrick Schoenmaker), Deadly Drive-in Disaster (Arjan Wilschut)
2017	Parade	Digna van der Put	Routine (Fokke Mars), Scrambled (Bastiaan Schravendeel), Short But Sweet (Junaid Chundrigar), Tabook (Dario Van Vree )
2018	Bullet Time	Frodo Kuipers	Bei mir bist du schön (Bauwine Pool), Deep (Michelle Verhoeks), Hate for sale (Anna Eijsbouts)
2019	At First Sight	Sjaak Rood	An unfinished love (Rami el Harayri), Fundament (Wilbert van Veldhuizen), How Countries Fight Their Wars (Thomas Loopstra)
2020	Sad Beauty	Arjan Brentjes	Second Floor (Dymphie Huijssen), Life at Oranjehotel (Mark Visser & Jeroen Schellekens), The End (Wiebe Bonnema), See Me (Patty Stenger & Yvonne Kroese)
2021	Camouflage	Remco Polman & Jantiene de Kroon	Bekeken (Kim de Ruyter), Jabberwocky (Sjaak Rood), Reflection (Sanna de Vries), Tidy Town (Dana Alink & Thirza van der Zee)
2022	The Smile	Erik van Schaaik	Aeronaut (Leon Golterman), Longing (Lotte Salomons), Tipping Point (Bart de Piraat), What Killed Timmy Bensen (Nick Cremers)
2023	Dog Days	George Hampshire	Rotten Child (Anej Golcar), The Grand Book (Arjan Brentjes), Fly (Patty Stenger), Hiraeth (Rianne Stremmelaar), Sensory Itch (Roel van Beek), Outside the Lines (Stan Oversteegen)

Mr. Zee Best Documentary
Year	Film	Director	Other Nominees
2013	-	-	-
2014	We Hunt	Vera Holland & Ted Alkemade	Still Can't Hear Her Mouth (Derville Quigley), Wij en de Wolven (Iris Grob)
2015	-	-	
2016	Jimmy on the Run	Wytse Koetse	Beautiful Woman (Diego nurse), Exist (Klaas Arie Westland), The Art of Flying (Jan van Ijken)
2017	Che!	Elsbeth Fraanje	I am Famous (Ismaël Lotz), I Was Only 14 (Froukje van Wengerden), What TIme is It (Karine Versluis)
2018	Girl on a Mission	Heleen D'Haens & Eva van Barneveld	Anita's Pack (Marlies Smeenge), Becoming (Jan van Ijken), Otherland (Jan Pieter Tuinstra & Keren Levi), Robert Mims the Texan Bull Rider (Doug Hancock)
2019	Tribe of Ghosts	Almichael Fraay	Commit (Tommy Köhbrugge & Lars Cleve), Nobu (Sarah Blok & Lisa Konno), Now or Never Again (Marieke Wildlak), Vishulst: An Amsterdam Picture From IKEA (Tom Roes)
2020	Girlsboysmix	Lara Aerts	Authenticity (Tommy Köhlbrugge & Lars Cleve), Jovanna for Future (Mirjam Marks), Craving to be Touched (Lieza Röben), No Dog in Amsterdam (Lucas Camps)
2021	Camouflage	Remco Polman & Jantiene de Kroon	Bekeken (Kim de Ruyter), Jabberwocky (Sjaak Rood), Reflection (Sanna de Vries), Tidy Town (Dana Alink & Thirza van der Zee)
2022	In Between Glass and Walls	Razan Hassan	Below the Surface (Thomas Ponsteen), Modellife (Jorn Koning), Planktonium (Jan van Ijken), So loud the Sky Can Hear Us (Lavinia Xausa)
2023	Only the Forgotten is Real	Mona Schier	A Precious Shadow (Tenzing Norbu Woing), Drag Hunt (Bo van der Meer & Maalou Wagemaker), Fantoomwijk (Ravi Sandberg), I Want to Go Higher (Amanda van Hesteren), Monsters (Lotte Salomons), Son (Tomas Ponsteen)

Mr. Zee Best Experimental Film
Year	Film	Director	Other Nominees
2013	Stardust	Mischa Rozema	
2014	The Rapid Eye	Floris + Menno	Endtrip (Koen de Mol & Olivier Ballast & Rick Franssen), I Love (New) Tokyo (Emmanuel Tennembaum)
2015	Expose	Moniek van der Knallen	Fast Nacht (Jasper de Bruijn & Bart Voorbergen)
2016	Platform 13	Camiel Zwart	Copyrette (Marc de Leeuw), Secret Sounds (Stephan van der Brink & Simon Muskitta), VUOTO (Guido F.G. Jeurissen)
2017	Ein Prost	Noël Lozen	Amuse (Jonne Covers & Ivo van Aart), Retina (Justin Heyl), Unseen (Justin Krul)
2018	Sisters	Daphne Lucker	A Death in the Family (Puck Litaay), No One Really No One Likes This (Simone Peelen), The Golden Shower Resort (Kamiel Rongen), Word! (Amos Mulder)
2019	Orbit	Tess Martin	14.05 Always a Kind of Onward (Guido F.G. Jeurissen), Echoing Memories (Jefta Varwijk), Fever (Rafael Romero Pena)
2020	A Boring Day in Hell	Ayla Spaans	Exodus (Guido F.G. Jeurissen), The Seas Are Rising (Stijf Verhoeff), De Lentloper (Martijn Schinkel), Voice (Tess Martin)
2021	States of Mind	Dirk Lentz	Backlash (Eva Glasbeek), Duna (Dion van Velzen), Exhale (Moniek van der Knallen), Serratus (Maarten Groen)
2022	Rotterdam Don't Leave Us	Guido F.G. Jeurissen	Fist (Thomas Bos), La Nostra Terra (Thomas Born), Primus (Jonas Smulders), You Can't Automate Me (Katarina Jazbec)
2023	New Babylon	Gideon van der Stelt	6:00 AM (Thom Lunshof), Alma (Lenke Duyvendak), Anahit (Laura Hermanides), Natturubond (Sven Peetoom & Jonathan Damborg & Grima Irmudottir), Prison with Songbirds (Ewan Macbeth), Still Here (Guido Ekker)

Mr. Zee Best Director of Photography
Year	Director of Photography	Film	Other Nominees
2013	Martijn Cousijn	Daniel	Erwan van Buuren (Drag Junky), Ivan Hidayat (Rood), Maxim Honoré (Foster), Robbie van Brussels (Wednesdays)
2014	Wouter Verberkt	Een Verre Reis	Casper Brink (Het Meisje aan de Overkant), Martijn Cousijn (Stained)
2015	Casper Brink	Fast Nacht	
2016	Tibor Dingelstad	Copyrette	Artyom Zakharenko (The Boy by the Sea), Aziz Al-Dilaimi (Three People Find a Car), Mark Lindeberg (Deadwood), Martijn Cousijn (Platform 13)
2017	Myrthe Mosterdman	Labor	Erik Journée (Aerts), Florens de Graaf (Everything is Endlessly), Noel Schoolderman (Osu), Joris Bulstra (Vigor)
2018	Casper Van Oort	Sisters	Abel van Dijk (A Death in the Family), Jan Pieter Tuinstra (Otherland), Thijmen Doornik (Think of Something Blue), Dennis Manda (Uncloud)
2019	Tim Kerbosch	Crow's Nest	Cristiaan van Leeuwen (Moonrise Carcosa), Emo Weemhoff (The Burden), Gregg Telussa (Snor), Tom Vorselaars (Alaraph)
2020	Bo Bolderink	Mania	Martijn Schinkel (De Lentloper), Job van Bijsteren (Wald), Kevin Kimman (The Blade), Henk Otte (Strawberry), Maxime Desmet (Re-Entry)
2021	Stephan Polman	Lead Balloons	Sam du Pon (Birdland), Zeno Dockx (Night Call), Noél Schoolderman (Shielded), Job Kraaijeveld (The Colour of Spinach)
2022	Christiaan van Leeuwen	Hantu	Jan van Ijken (Planktonium), Joris Bulstra (Shut), Lawrence Lee (Rotterdam, Don't Leave Us), Matija Pekìc (You Can't Automate Me), Myrthe Mosterdman (Spotless)
2023	Amit Kumar	6:00 AM	Cristiaan van Leeuwen (Missing Child), Jonathan Damborg (Náttúrubönd), Martijn van Broekhuizen (I'm Not a Robot), Sveta Aparina (Life on Hold), Thijmen Doornik (Anahit)

Mr. Zee Best Editing/Post Production

Year	Editor	Film	Other Nominees
2013	Mischa Rozema	Stardus	Joel Hielckert (Daniël), Nicolien van Loon (Naar het Einde van de Straat), Jan Meij (Rood)
2014	Jan-Willem de Kraaij	La Commedia	Kurt Platvoet (Een Verre Reis), Koen de Mol & Rick Franssen & Olivier Ballast (Endtrip)
2015	-	-	-
2016	Wytse Koetse	Jimmy on the Run	Guido F.G. Jeurissen (VUOTO), Pelle Asselbergs (Copyrette), Wietse de Zwart (Deserted)
2017	Xander Nijsten	Sweet Tooth	Ivo van Aart (Amuse), Ruben Labree (Labor), Sjoerd Dekker (Osu)
2018	Tobias Cornelissen	Sisters	Michiel Boesveldt (Yolo4real), Patrick Schonewille (Nightshade), Patrick Janssens (Otherland), Augustine Huijsser (Pizzamonster)
2019	Fatih Tura & Joshua Menco & Tom Oud	NOBU	Fatih Tura (School's Out), Guido Ekker (Shadowboxers), Kevin Tromp (Moonrise Carcosa), Tim Straver (Run Baby Run)
2020	Patrick Schonewille	Re-Entry	Sander Kuipers (After the Dance), Robin Piree (The Blade), Gijs Onvlee (The Man and the Fish), Tim Roza (Blood Group)
2021	Jean-Baptiste Guignot	Free Fall	Pepijn Ashman (A View From Above), Maarten Ernest (Jerry), Xander Nijsten (The Departure), Emiel Nuninga (When You Hear the Devine Call)
2022	Loëlle Monsanto	Donna	Joel Heyl & Maarten Welzen (The Pamphlet), Max Paschke (Kids of the Bims), Nathan Idzinga & Stanley Kolk (Housemaid #2), Pepijn Ashmann (Hogweed), Tessel Flora de Vries (Funkele)
2023	Tessel Flora de Vries	Jammed	Demi Wesselo (Life on Hold), Jasper Ten Hoor & Ferrando Meraldi (Gnomes), Johannes de Jong (Dedication), Joshua Menco (Artjom), Michiel Boesveldt (I'M Not a Robot)
