= Centrale Veiligheidsdienst =

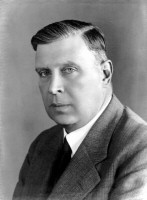
Louis Einthoven, director

The Centrale Veiligheidsdienst (CVD) was a Dutch security agency founded in 1946 as the successor to the Bureau Nationale Veiligheid. It was transformed into the Binnenlandse Veiligheidsdienst in 1949.

== Foundation ==
World War II had made it clear to the Dutch government how important a good intelligence service was, and wished to install a more general and permanent institution than the Bureau Nationale Veiligheid (BNV), whose primary mission had been to roll up remnants of German intelligence services, monitor former collaborators with the German regime, and track separatists in Dutch Indonesia. Louis Einthoven, head of the BNV, advised the government to model a security agency after the British MI5, meaning it would be responsible for gathering intelligence but have not the power to enforce laws, in order to prevent the agency from being a secret police like the German Gestapo.

The CVD was founded with a (secret) Royal Decree on 9 April 1946, and Einthoven was its first director. It was run under the Ministry of General Affairs, headed by prime minister Louis Beel.

== Sources ==
- Constant Hijzen, Terug naar de bron. Vrijheid, onvrijheid en de dienst in de jaren veertig en vijftig, Uitg. Algemene Inlichtingen- en Veiligheidsdienst, Zoetermeer 2021.
