= Layla M. =

2016 film

- Film poster
- Directed by: Mijke de Jong
- Written by: Jan Eilander; Mijke de Jong
- Starring: Nora El Koussour
- Cinematography: Danny Elsen
- Edited by: Dorith Vinken
- Distributed by: Cinemien
- Release dates: 10 September 2016 (TIFF); 17 November 2016 (Netherlands)
- Running time: 98 minutes
- Country: Netherlands
- Languages: Dutch; Arabic; English
- Box office: ~$266,000 (Note: Box Office Mojo gives the gross as $266,010 and The Numbers gives a slightly different figure of $265,505)

Layla M. is a 2016 Dutch drama film directed by Mijke de Jong. It stars Nora El Koussour as Layla, a young Dutch woman of Moroccan background who rebels against her family and schooling to become an Islamic fundamentalist. As in other films by de Jong, the focus is on a strong-willed woman coming of age. In Layla M., de Jong and her collaborator Jan Eilander wanted to examine the radicalisation of European youngsters. The writers were inspired by a contemporary account. In addition, they were influenced by writing it during the Arab Spring and the trial of Geert Wilders, a Dutch politician known for stands against immigration of Muslims to Europe.

The film premiered at the BFI London Film Festival in 2016. The home media reviews were favourable and internationally the film was well-received. At the Netherlands Film Festival, El Koussour won the Golden Calf for Best Actress and Mohammed Azaay won the Golden Calf Award for Best Supporting Actor. The film was selected as the Dutch entry for the Best Foreign Language Film at the 90th Academy Awards.

== Plot ==
Layla M. is a young Dutch Muslim of Moroccan background. She was born and raised in Amsterdam, where the film begins. On the street and at school, she faces Islamophobia and racism. Whilst her mother and father are happily assimilated into Dutch culture, Layla starts to rebel and to move toward Islamic fundamentalism. She begins to watch and circulate short films she finds on the internet about the oppression of Muslims in Syria and Gaza, then decides to make a film herself, a decision which angers her parents. When a ban on wearing burqas is made, this only strengthens her resolve to wear one, even though the decision drives her away from friends at school including her best friend Meryem. After she is arrested with her brother Younes at a football match, she argues with her family. She disagrees with her father on how to interpret the teachings of the Quran and is disappointed by her brother's decision to shave off his beard.

Layla then falls in love with a young radical called Abdel who talks to her on Skype about their shared political beliefs. She decides to marry him in secret. They go to a jihadist training camp in Belgium and narrowly evade being arrested by the police, before relocating together to Amman, the capital city of Jordan. When she lives abroad in a different culture, Layla's political radicalism is tested as she struggles to adjust to a patriarchal society in which she is excluded from Abdel's meetings with other men, having been accustomed to gender equality in the Netherlands. She begins to see the hypocrisy of extremism and again becomes dissatisfied with her life. The film ends with her being interviewed by the Dutch intelligence service (AIVD) upon her return home.

== Cast ==
- Nora El Koussour as Layla
- Ilias Addab as Abdel
- Hassan Akkouch as Zine
- Yasemin Cetinkaya as Oum Osama, Layla's neighbor in Jordan
- Husam Chadat as Sheikh Abdullah Al Sabin
- Mohammed Azaay as Layla's father
- Esma Abouzahra as Layla's mother
- Bilal Wahib as Younes, Layla's brother
- Ayisha Siddiqi as Meryem, Layla's best friend
- Sachli Gholamalizad as Senna, the aid worker for the refugee camp

== Production ==
Mijke de Jong previously focused upon strong young female characters in films such as Bluebird, Katia's Sister and Joy. In the early 2010s, the radicalisation of European youngsters into Islamic fundamentalists led to around 3000 people (of which 550 were women) travelling to the Middle East to join the Islamic State of Iraq and the Levant (ISIS). A total of around 220 people travelled from the Netherlands to Iraq and Syria, of which almost half were Moroccan-Dutch. De Jong intended to write a script based on her own youthful experiences in the Dutch squatters movement until she met a Dutch woman who had converted to Islam and married a man who had then undergone a radicalisation process. The young couple would sometimes visit Morocco, and on their final trip, the man disappeared for several weeks, returning as an Islamic militant who had shaved his beard off in preparation for a suicide bombing. The woman divorced her husband and never heard from him again. Her story captivated de Jong, and she and co-writer Jan Eilander instead wrote a new script. At the time of writing, the Arab Spring was underway and in the Netherlands, Geert Wilders was on trial for inciting hatred against Dutch Moroccans. De Jong has commented that "for me, the film isn’t so much about showing a radicalization process, but about a girl with a radical personality."

Casting director Rebecca van Unen suggested Nora El Koussour to play the main role. El Koussour had recently graduated from a theatre school in Rotterdam. When she enjoyed singing a nasheed with Ilias Addab, de Jong was happy with the chemistry between the actors and decided to cast her. Layla M. was shot completely on location, in Belgium, Germany, Jordan and the Netherlands, and co-produced by these four countries. The original plan had been to film in Syria, but the outbreak of the Syrian civil war meant that production switched to Jordan. Layla M. was acquired by BetaFilms for international distribution before its screening at the Toronto International Film Festival in September 2016 and premiered in Europe the following month at the BFI London Film Festival. The film had a cinematic release in the Netherlands on 17 November 2016, grossing $71,804 on its opening weekend and around $266,000 worldwide thereafter. It was released on DVD and Video on demand (VOD) on 27 March 2017.

== Reception ==
=== Critical response ===
The Dutch media was enthusiastic about Layla M.. The Algemeen Dagblad called it an "important" story and gave it four stars out of five, whilst De Telegraaf (also four stars) praised El Koussour's talent. The international reviews of the film were generally favourable. As of August 2024, Layla M. had an approval rating of 100 per cent on review aggregator website Rotten Tomatoes, based on 10 reviews, and an average rating of 77 per cent. Variety noted that the film came at a time when Islamophobia was on the rise in Western Europe and wrote that "El Koussour and Addab share a gentle chemistry that curdles into romantic tragedy". Screen Daily observed an "intelligent approach to complex matters", highlighting the cinematography of Danny Elsen and El Koussour's star performance. The New York Times found it a "persuasive case study" of radicalisation. The Hollywood Reporter criticised aspects of the film such as the narrative and the development of supporting roles, whilst also praising its topicality and the location work in Jordan.

=== Accolades ===
Layla M. was selected as the Dutch entry for the Best Foreign Language Film at the 90th Academy Awards. It was also nominated for four Golden Calves. Nora El Koussour won the Golden Calf for Best Actress and Mohammed Azaay won the Golden Calf Award for Best Supporting Actor. El Koussour also won the Special Jury prize for outstanding performance at Philadelphia Film Festival. At Filmfest München it won the Fritz Gerlich Prize.

== See also ==
- List of submissions to the 90th Academy Awards for Best Foreign Language Film
- List of Dutch submissions for the Academy Award for Best Foreign Language Film
