= Wim Sanders =

Dutch politician

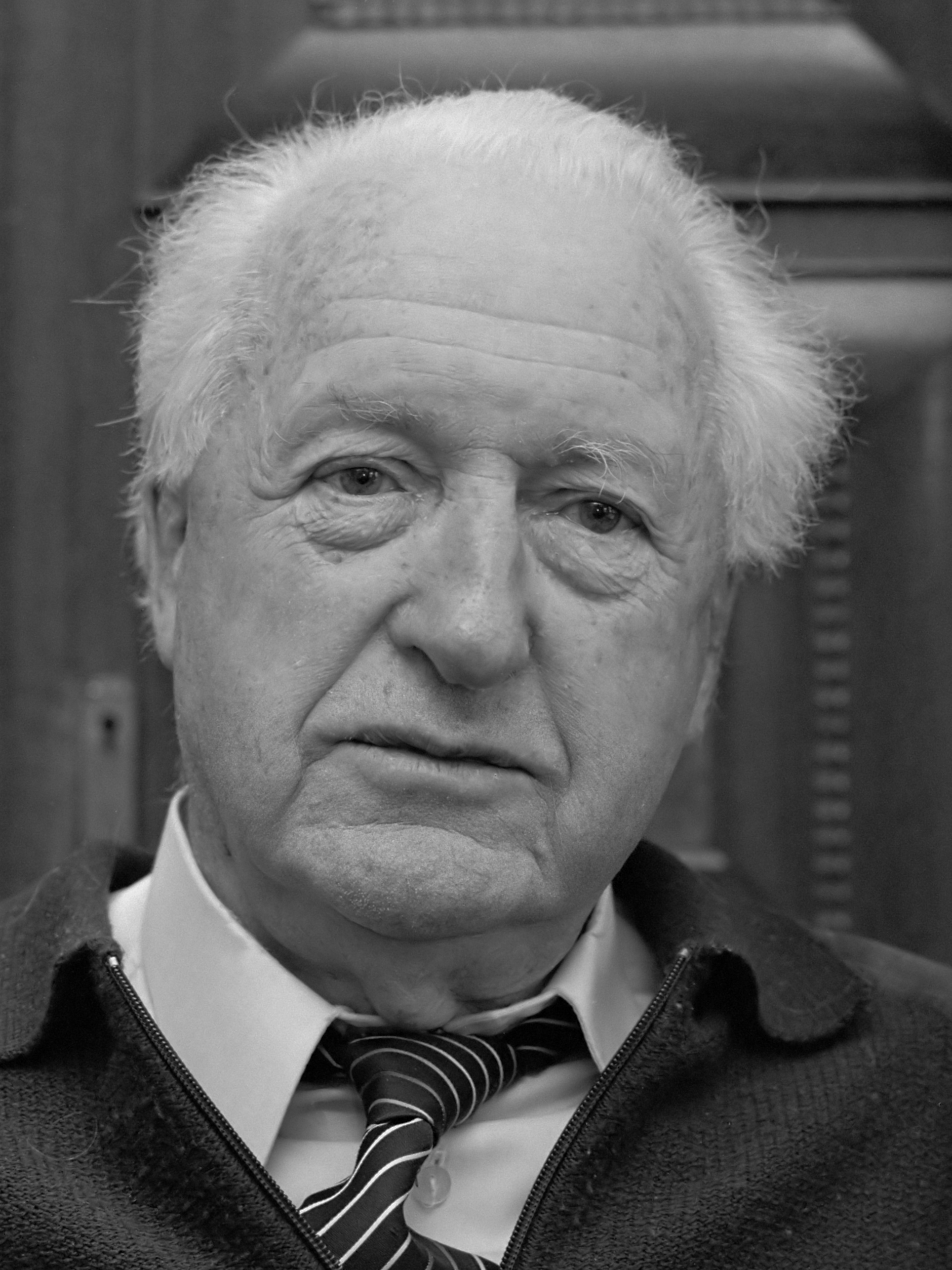
- Born: Willem Evert Sanders; 9 August 1908; Arnhem, Netherlands
- Died: 11 April 1995 (aged 89); Amsterdam, Netherlands
- Known for: World War II Resistance fighter & politician

Wim Sanders (9 August 1908 – 11 April 1995) was a Dutch politician and World War II resistance fighter.

== Biography ==
Sanders grew up in Enschede. His father was a councilor and alderman on behalf of the SDAP. Sanders obtained his Mulo diploma in 1925 and then got a police job, first in Lonneker as a clerk and later in Enschede as an inspector. As a border municipality, Enschede in the 1930s regularly had to deal with Jewish refugees from Germany. The order from The Hague was to transfer them back across the border if they had no valid papers. Sanders contributed to this.

After the German invasion in May 1940 Sanders assisted the occupying forces in the arrest of several Twentse Communists (in June 1941) and Jewish Enschedeers (in September 1941). Most detainees from the latter groups lost their lives in the Mauthausen concentration camp in the weeks and months that followed. However, the policeman found it increasingly difficult to cooperate with the occupying forces. In December 1941 he refused to arrest those who refused to join the Arbeitseinsatz and was arrested. On the intercession of Walter Horak, he was released but fired from the police.

In the period after that, Sanders became involved in the resistance. Together with Simon Schuilenga and Jan Posthuma, two employees of the PTT, he formed the Centrale Inlichtingendienst (CID). They tried to build a nationwide illegal telephone network. They also devoted themselves to wiretapping the Sicherheitsdienst and other German authorities and thus acquired a lot of information about SD infiltrators and other collaborators. As head of the CID, Sanders—who was active under the pseudonym Hiemstra—played a pivotal role within the resistance. In February 1945 he narrowly escaped arrest.

In the same period he founded the Political Crimes Service. This was a group of about sixty men who hunted traitors. This investigative service was merged into the Bureau of National Security, a predecessor of Internal Security Service (today known as the General Intelligence and Security Service). However, Sanders soon came into conflict with Louis Einthoven, director of the BNV. At the beginning of the war, Einthoven had been one of the three foremen of the Nederlandsche Unie. This mass movement tried to give the Dutch people a certain independent position within the limits of the German occupation wind. Several members of the resistance, including Koos Vorrink (the first chairman of the Partij van de Arbeid), felt that the Nederlandsche Unie had gone too far in its cooperation with the German government.

Sanders became friends with Vorrink after the war. In the media, the battle between Einthoven and Sanders was therefore portrayed as a battle between left and right. The battle was settled in favor of Einthoven. Sanders was arrested in September 1946 for the theft of files in the office of Prime Minister Louis Beel. A few hours later he was free again, but a job at the security services he could forget.

Sanders played a dubious role in the Dries Riphagen case. Riphagen was an Amsterdam criminal who had worked closely with the Germans during the war. He was responsible for the arrest of at least a hundred Jews. After the war, the BNV arrested Riphagen. However, he promised to provide information about other "wrong" Dutch people. In return, he could count on lenient treatment. Riphagen was not housed in prison, but with BNV employee Frits Kerkhoven. Sanders, who at the time was already fully engaged in the power struggle with Einthoven, feared that his soft approach to Riphagen could be used against him. According to the Parool journalists Bart Middelburg and René ter Steege, who wrote a book about Riphagen, Sanders even helped him escape to Germany in a coffin.

In 1996 the book De Affaire-Sanders was published by Netherlands Institute for War Documentation and it's investigator Gerard Aalders and historian Coen Hilbrink. This book was criticized in reviews for being far too positive about Sanders and justifying many of his many missteps.

The NIOD board did not wish to take responsibility for the text parts written by Hilbrink, because they would not be scientifically sound.

== Movie ==
In September 2016, Riphagen, a film about the life of Dries Riphagen, premiered. The film is based on the book of the same name by journalists Bart Middelburg and René ter Steege. In the film, Sanders is played by Michel Sluysmans.
