= Marcel Musters =

Dutch actor

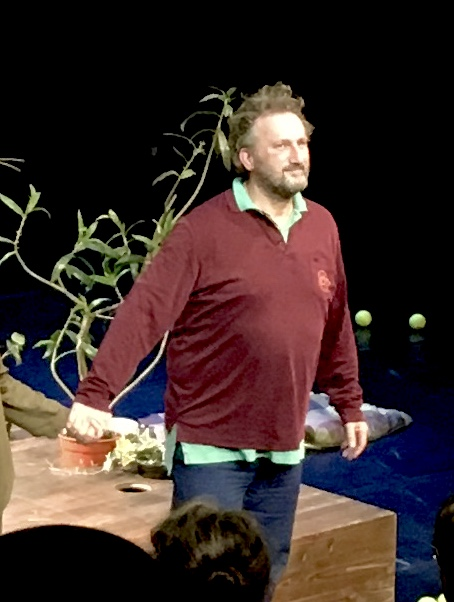
- Marcel Musters in 2016
- Born: 6 June 1959 (age 65)
- Occupation: Actor
- Awards: Golden Calf for Best Actor 2019 God Only Knows

Marcel Musters (born 6 June 1959) is a Dutch actor.

In 2019, he won the Golden Calf for Best Actor award for his role in the film God Only Knows directed by Mijke de Jong. In 2020, a print of his hand was added to the 'Walk of Fame' in the Vinkenburgstraat in Utrecht, Netherlands.

== Awards ==
- 2019: Golden Calf for Best Actor, God Only Knows

== Selected filmography ==
- 1990: Crocodiles in Amsterdam
- 1996: Laagland
- 2004: The Preacher
- 2005: Offers
- 2010: Dik Trom
- 2013: Feuten: Het Feestje
- 2019: God Only Knows
