= Disappearance (2017 Dutch film) =

2017 film

- Film poster
- Directed by: Boudewijn Koole
- Written by: Jolein Laarman
- Starring: Jakob Oftebro
- Release date: 2 March 2017
- Running time: 90 minutes
- Countries: Netherlands; Norway
- Languages: Dutch; Norwegian

Disappearance (Dutch: Verdwijnen) is a 2017 Dutch drama film directed by Boudewijn Koole. It was shortlisted by the EYE Film Institute Netherlands as one of the eight films to be selected as the potential Dutch submission for the Academy Award for Best Foreign Language Film at the 90th Academy Awards. However, it was not selected, with Layla M. being chosen as the Dutch entry.

== Cast ==
- Jakob Oftebro as Johnny
- Rifka Lodeizen as Roos
- Marcus Hanssen as Bengt
- Elsie de Brauw as Louise
