= God Only Knows (disambiguation) =

"God Only Knows" is a 1966 song by the Beach Boys.

God Only Knows may also refer to:

- "God Only Knows" (1954 song), a song by the Capris
- "God Only Knows", a track by Cornelius from the 1997 album Fantasma
- "God Only Knows" (MKTO song), 2013
- "God Only Knows" (For King & Country song), 2018
- By the Gun, a 2014 American film formerly known as God Only Knows
- God Only Knows (2019 film), a Dutch language arthouse film
- "God Only Knows", a track by Ozzy Osbourne from his 2022 album Patient Number 9
