= Bureau Nationale Veiligheid =

Dutch security agency

Agency overview
- Formed: 30 May 1945; 81 years ago
- Headquarters: Europaweg 4, Zoetermeer, Netherlands
- Minister responsible: Minister of the Interior and Kingdom Relations
- Parent department: Ministry of the Interior and Kingdom Relations

The Bureau Nationale Veiligheid (BNV) was a Dutch security agency that was founded in 1945 and succeeded in 1946 by the Centrale Veiligheidsdienst, which in turn was transformed into the Binnenlandse Veiligheidsdienst (BVD) in 1949.

== Foundation ==
The Bureau Nationale Veiligheid was established on May 29, 1945, by the Chief of Staff of the Military Authority, Major General H.J. Kruls. The objective was to guarantee the security of the state and to maintain contact with the Allies about this. When the Military Authority was dissolved on 4 March 1946, the BNV came under the responsibility of the Ministry of General Warfare.

The BNV was initially intended to roll up the remnants of German security and intelligence services and their possible stay-behind networks. In addition, the agency helped with the purge of the police and administrative bodies and kept an eye on Indonesian activists, the BNV also investigated the activities of Reinder Zwolsman and other collaborators. The underlying intention was to prevent the freedom that the Netherlands had lost during the German occupation from being lost again. Many employees of the BNV came from the resistance, especially from the Albrecht Group, and for them this work was in a sense a continuation of what they had already done during the war.

== Corruption ==
On behalf of Prime Minister Gerbrandy and Minister of War Jan de Quay, the BNV employed the members of former resistance groups in order to benefit from their information about war criminals and traitors. In November 1945, the BNV employed 1356 people, a far too large number to check whether they were reliable enough. This led to "wild west" situations in which former resistance fighters sometimes thought they could still afford things that they were used to during the war.

In this way, the Political Crimes Service of Wim Sanders, which was involved in tracking down collaborators and war criminals, was also included in the BNV (as Bureau D). As a result, Sanders came to work under the leadership of Louis Einthoven, which led to a fierce power struggle. On behalf of the Ministry of Justice, which wanted to take over the security task, Sanders secretly made copies of hundreds of BNV files. For this, Einthoven had him arrested on 2 September 1946, but although he was soon released, Sanders could not return to the BNV as a result.

== Dissolution ==
As a result of the Sanders affair and complaints about abuses within the BNV, Prime Minister Beel set up the Wijnvelt Committee, which issued a 191-page report on 12 May 1948. Among other things, it was concluded that Einthoven had made policy mistakes, but because the set-up of the BNV was not well thought out in advance, he could stay on as head, and then become the head of the CVD and the BVD.

In January 1946, the government had already decided to dissolve the BNV on 31 December of that year, as there appeared to be no longer any question of German sabotage activities. Meanwhile, for future tasks in the field of internal security, the Centrale Veiligheidsdienst (CVD) was established in April 1946, which was renamed the Binnenlandse Veiligheidsdienst (BVD) in 1949.

== Literature ==
- Constant Hijzen, Terug naar de bron. Vrijheid, onvrijheid en de dienst in de jaren veertig en vijftig, Uitg. Algemene Inlichtingen- en Veiligheidsdienst, Zoetermeer 2021.
