= Betje Wery =

Dutch Nazi Collaborator

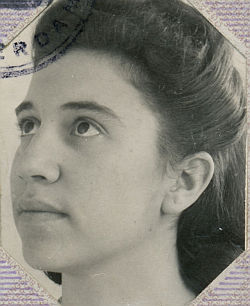
- Born: Elisabeth Wery; 26 August 1920; Rotterdam, Netherlands
- Died: 16 October 2006 (aged 86); Ede, Netherlands
- Other name: Bella Tuerlings
- Occupation: Nazi collaborator
- Spouse(s): Frans Tuerlings; Mijndert Vonk
- Children: 2

Elisabeth Wery (26 August 1920 – 16 October 2006) was a Dutch Nazi collaborator who is best known in the Netherlands for collaborating with the Nazi Sicherheitsdienst (SD) to locate as many Dutch Jews as possible and have them delivered to Nazi concentration camps during the occupation.

== Biography ==
Wery was the eldest daughter of a family of two children to Roosje Boers (1896–1997) and Ferdinand Werij (1894–1969). Her mother was Jewish and her father half-Jewish. She attended domestic science school for two years and advanced primary school for three years. In early 1940 she worked in a Bata shoe store in her hometown of Rotterdam.

Following the German invasion of the Netherlands, Wery was initially registered as fully Jewish but successfully challenged this registration. She stated that her maternal grandmother Kaatje Mauritius, born 1864, was an illegitimate child of Arie de Vries, a non-Jew from Utrecht. Her lawyer came up with two very old witnesses from Mauritius' hometown of Gorcum who claimed that "everyone in Gorcum knew that Kaatje was the illegitimate daughter of de Vries". The campaign was successful, as her status was converted to half-Jewish.

In January 1941 Wery met Franciscus Antonius Cornelis "Frans" Tuerlings, whom she married on 17 September 1941. The couple went to live in Vught. Shortly before that, she had joined the Roman Catholic Church so that she would not be given "mixed marriage" status. Nevertheless, Wery was arrested a year later because she was not wearing a star badge and sent to Amersfoort concentration camp. A day later, she was released thanks to her husband's connections. She was able to obtain a Sperre, a document which exempted her from deportation for the time being. In May 1943 she was officially given the status of half-Jewish so that she no longer had to wear a star.

Her husband, who was involved in foreign exchange smuggling and black trading in securities and diamonds, died in a car accident in late 1943. Because of his missteps, the occupation authorities interviewed Wery. She agreed to work for the Devisenschutzkommando (DSK), the SS unit responsible for the acquisition of financial assets in occupied nations, as an informant (Vertrauens-Frau, shortened to V-Frau).

In early 1944, Wery took up residence under the name Bella Tuerlings in an apartment at 26 Rubensstraat in Amsterdam. She infiltrated her husband's network of black traders and handed several of them over to her colleague Dries Riphagen, a notorious Jew hunter. She herself received a good salary for this. In May 1944 she came into contact with German resistance fighter Gerhard Badrian, one of the leaders of a major identity card forging operation (PBC). On 30 June 1944, Wery lured Badrian, his girlfriend, and two colleagues to her apartment. Badrian resisted and was immediately shot dead by the Sicherheitsdienst. His colleagues Charly Hartog and Frits Boverhuis were arrested. Then the whole PBC was rolled up. Wery received a thousand guilders as a reward. The resistance declared her an outlaw, after which she went into hiding. She was regularly visited by SD chief Willy Lages at her hiding place, with whom she probably had a sexual relationship.

Lages advised Wery to move to Belgium. She arrived in Antwerp in August 1944 under the name Elisabeth Stips and again committed herself to the DSK there. In October 1944 she moved to Brussels, which had meanwhile been taken by the Allies, and there she got into a relationship with Oreste Pinto, the local head of the Dutch counterintelligence service. She obtained proof of political reliability, partly because thanks to her the double agent Christiaan Lindemans (also known by his alias King Kong) had been arrested. Yet she fell through the cracks and was arrested on 24 December 1944 and imprisoned in a monastery in Valkenburg. In August 1945 she was transferred to the House of Detention in Amsterdam. There she shared a cell with Ans van Dijk and Jeanne Valkenburg.

Wery appeared before the Special Court, which demanded the death penalty in 1948. The judge eventually sentenced her to life in prison, but she was released in the 1950s.

In prison, she had met the former SD Mijndert Vonk, who had been convicted of murder. They married in November 1959 and had two children together. They started a marriage mediation agency, first in Schiedam and from 1967 in Ede, where the family also lived. Wery made headlines again when she introduced single women to Henk van der Meijden's TV-Privé television program at the end of 1979. As a result, her war past was exposed. TROS decided not to ask Wery to appear anymore.

Wery died on 16 October 2006.

== Film ==
In September 2016, Riphagen, a film about the life of Dries Riphagen, premiered. The film is based on the book of the same name by journalists Bart Middelburg and René ter Steege. Middelburg interviewed Wery several times in 1989. In the film, Wery is played by Anna Raadsveld.

== See also ==
- Stella Goldschlag
