= Laagland =

1996 film

- Directed by: Yolanda Entius
- Country of origin: Netherlands
- Original language: Dutch

Production
- Running time: 100 minutes

Original release
- Release: 1996

Laagland is a 1996 Dutch TV film directed by Yolanda Entius.

== Cast ==
- Marcel Musters ... Jan
- Lineke Rijxman ... Ellen
- Tom Jansen ... Simon
- Finn Poncin ... Jos
- Marre van den Brand ... Meisje
- Yolanda Entius ... Jetteke
- Mark Rietman ... Leo
- Oda Spelbos ... Vriendin
- Myra de Vries ... Vriendin
- Mees Jongema ... Vriendin (as Mijs Heesen)
- Ella Snoep ... Buurvrouw
