= Dries Riphagen =

Dutch gangster and Nazi collaborator (1909–1973)

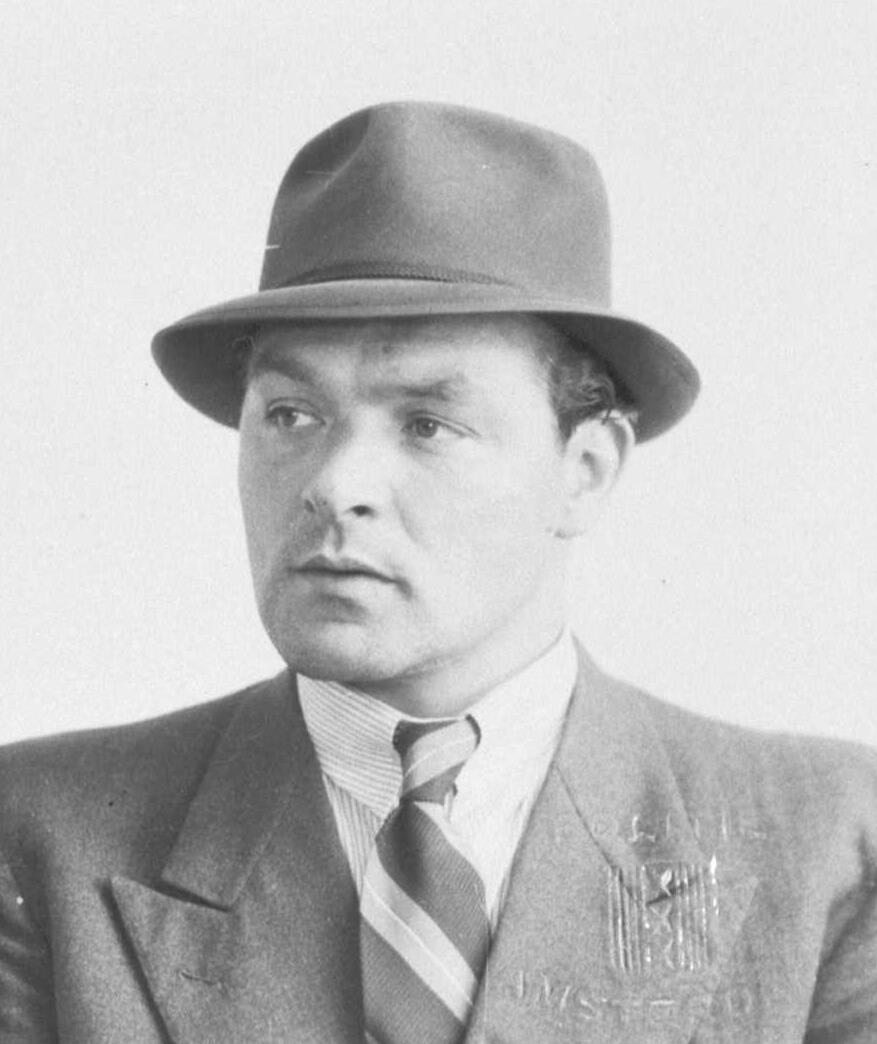
- Riphagen in 1945
- Born: Bernardus Andries Riphagen; 7 September 1909; Amsterdam, Netherlands
- Died: 13 May 1973 (aged 63); Montreux, Switzerland
- Occupations: Gangster, con artist, Nazi collaborator
- Spouse: Greetje Riphagen

Bernardus Andreas "Dries" Riphagen (7 September 1909 – 13 May 1973) was a Dutch gangster and Nazi collaborator who is best known in the Netherlands for collaborating with the Nazi Sicherheitsdienst (SD) to locate as many Dutch Jews as possible and have them delivered to Nazi concentration camps during the occupation.

Riphagen would gain the trust of Jews by promising to safeguard their belongings, primarily jewellery, until the conclusion of the war, only to defraud them of their belongings and notify the SD of their location. After the end of war in Europe, he faked his death and went into hiding. He deposited the stolen Jewish belongings and money in an undetermined bank in neutral Switzerland and fled to Argentina, as had many Nazi officers.

He secretly returned to Europe at some point between 1950 and 1970, to withdraw the ill-gotten jewellery. Dutch authorities issued an arrest warrant and bounty on Riphagen in 1988 but it later transpired that he had died at a Swiss private clinic in Montreux in 1973.

== Biography ==
=== Early life ===
Riphagen was born as the eighth child into a Dutch family in Amsterdam. Riphagen's father worked for the Royal Dutch Navy, while his mother, a homemaker, died when he was six years old. His father married a second time but did not take care of the children because he was an alcoholic. At the age of 14, Dries Riphagen was sent to the notorious merchant-navy training center "Pollux". From 1923 to 1924, he went to sea as an ordinary seaman. He stayed in the United States for two years working for Standard Oil, during which time he came into contact with local criminal circles and learned their methods. His subsequent nickname, "Al Capone", came from this time in the United States.

After his return from the United States, Riphagen joined the National Socialist Dutch Workers' Party (NSNAP, aimed to be the Dutch version of Hitler's NSDAP), an extremely anti-Semitic minor party whose aim was that the Netherlands should become a province of the German Reich. He became one of the foremost figures of the Amsterdam underworld, known among the pimps on the Rembrandtplein, and developed a taste for jewellery, precious stones, gambling, as well as dealing in used—sometimes stolen—cars.

=== Second World War ===
During the war, Riphagen continued his criminal activities and expanded into profitable co-operation with the German occupiers as a trustworthy ally of the German security service, the SD, and later as a member of the Central Office for Jewish immigration in Amsterdam. It was his task, together with his "colleagues" from the Amsterdam underworld, to uncover the black market as well as to track down Jewish property, which was being sold outside the German foreign exchange regulations. As a bonus, the men received five to ten per cent of the confiscated goods and they slipped many valuables into their own pockets.

Dries Riphagen soon took part in the hunt for Jews (Judenjagd) together with members of the Olij family, who were feared Jodenkloppers (Jew beaters). From 1943 he was part of the Henneicke Column, a group of investigators who searched out Jews who had gone underground. This approximately fifty-strong group was founded in 1942 by Wim Henneicke, the stateless son of a German immigrant. From 4 to 31 March 1943 the Column, which consisted mainly of professional criminals, handed over 3,190 Jews to the German authorities, who deported them to concentration camps in Eastern Europe. A reward of between 7.50 and 40 guilders per person was paid. The Column also coerced Jewish people with the threat of deportation to betray other Jews who had gone into hiding. By the end of 1943, Riphagen had collected a small fortune, which he deposited in various accounts in Belgium and Switzerland. Finally the Henneicke Column was dissolved on the grounds of corruption. Riphagen was employed in the last year of the war by the Hoffmann Group of the SD in Assen, which specialized in the detection of shot-down Allied airmen and weapons that had been dropped to the resistance. Riphagen played an important role in 1944 in partially rolling up the underground resistance organisation Identity Cards Centre (Persoonbewijzencentrale), in the course of which the Jewish-German resistance fighter Gerhard Badrian was shot.

=== After the war ===
After the war, Dries Riphagen was wanted by the police for the betrayal of Jews as well as treason and the public prosecutor considered him responsible for the death of at least 200 people. Riphagen contacted the former resistance fighter and head of police in Enschede, Willem Evert Sanders, who wanted to make a deal with him. Riphagen was not handed over to the authorities but was placed under house-arrest as a "private" prisoner in exchange of information on collaborators and German-friendly networks. In February 1946 he escaped; according to rumours, he was helped across the border by his underworld friends in a casket inside a hearse but according to more recent findings, the escape was organized by two staff members of the Dutch secret service Bureau voor Nationale Veiligheid, Frits and Piet Kerkhoven. From Belgium he spent three months travelling to Spain by bicycle, according to his son Rob.

In May 1946, Riphagen was held in Huesca, Spain, because he lacked the necessary personal papers. He was imprisoned but on the intervention of a Jesuit priest he was released on bail, under the order to get his papers rectified. He obtained a Nansen passport and Frits Kerkhoven provided him with clothes and shoes in which diamonds that he had deposited with Kerkhoven were hidden. When he was about to be extradited to the Netherlands—he was now living in Madrid—he flew to Argentina on 21 March 1948 with a friend. His contact address there was also that of a Jesuit priest, but nothing is known of any connection with the ratlines. The Dutch ambassador in Buenos Aires, Floris Carcilius Anne Baron van Pallandt, made a request for extradition, based on lesser offences such as vehicle theft and robbery and which, according to the Argentine judiciary, were already time-barred and for which the submitted evidence was inadequate.

That Riphagen was not handed over to the Netherlands was most likely due to his good connections. He was friends with a member of the Supreme Court of Argentina, Rodolfo Valenzuela, who also served as secretary to President Juan Perón. He became acquainted with the presidential couple and remained in contact with Perón until his death. He settled in Belgrano, a district of Buenos Aires, where he ran a photography press office and worked for Perón's secret service as an instructor in anti-communist tactics, imparting whatever knowledge he acquired working for Germany during the war. He also organized boxing competitions at the Luna Park for Jan Olij, his old friend from Amsterdam.

After the Revolucion Libertadora, where Perón was overthrown, Riphagen returned to Europe and travelled around, mainly in Spain, Germany and Switzerland. He preferred to surround himself with wealthy women, who also maintained him. His last known address was in Madrid. In 1973, Dries Riphagen, the "worst war criminal in Amsterdam", died of cancer in Montreux.

== Historical re-appraisal in the Netherlands ==
In 2010 two Dutch journalists and employees of the newspaper Het Parool, Bart Middelburg and René ter Steege, published the book Riphagen, 'Al Capone', één van Nederlands grootste oorlogsmisdadigers (Riphagen, 'Al Capone': One of the Netherlands' Greatest War Criminals). The book is based on interviews with Dries Riphagen's son, Rob, and Betje Wery, who had collaborated with the Germans.

In 2016 the film Riphagen by director Pieter Kuijpers was produced in the Netherlands, the main character being portrayed by actor Jeroen van Koningsbrugge. The screenplay was written by Thomas van der Ree and Paul Jan Nelisse, based on the book by Middelburg and Ter Steege. In 2017, Dutch TV station VPRO broadcast the film as a three part series.
