= Old Tongues =

Oude Tongen
- Theatrical release poster
- Directed by: Gerardjan Rijnders
- Written by: Gerardjan Rijnders
- Produced by: Hans de Weers
- Cinematography: Maarten Kramer
- Edited by: Wim Louwrier
- Music by: Boudewijn Tarenskeen
- Production companies: Bergen; Toneelgroep Amsterdam; NOS
- Distributed by: Meteor Film
- Release date: 1994
- Running time: 90 minutes
- Country: Netherlands
- Language: Dutch

Old Tongues or Oude Tongen is a 1994 Dutch film directed by Gerardjan Rijnders.

== Cast ==
- Jasper Kraaij, as "Bartje Mossel"
- Fred Goessens, as "Ab Mossel"
- Lieneke le Roux, as "Ria Mossel"
- Hannah Risselada, as "Babs"
- Rosa Risselada, as "Nicole"
- Mark Rietman, as "Dokter Peter Ligt"
- Catherine ten Bruggencate, as "Dokter Jannie Ligt"
- Nora Kretz, as "Oma Ligt"
- Celia Nufaar, as "Heike in't Veld"
- Damien Hope, as "Florisje Delevita"
- Pierre Bokma, as "Richard Delevita"
- Lineke Rijxman, as "Mary Delevita"
- Hayo Bruins, as "Hans Godhelp"
- Marjon Brandsma, as "Truus Godhelp"
- Hein van der Heijden, as "Theo Klein"
