= Broos (film) =

1997 film by Mijke de Jong

- Directed by: Mijke de Jong
- Written by: Mijke de Jong, Jolein Laarman
- Release date: 18 September 1997
- Running time: 80 minutes
- Country: Netherlands
- Language: Dutch

Broos (Frail) is a 1997 Dutch film directed by Mijke de Jong. It is based on a play, in which five sisters meet up to record a message for their parents' 40th wedding anniversary. The film was shot on location in 14 days with backing from the Netherlands Film Fund.

All five actresses won the Golden Calf for Best Actress. Cinemagazine saw Broos as a "fine prologue" to de Jong's 2014 film Brozer (Frailer).

== Cast ==
- Marnie Blok as Ted
- Lieneke le Roux as Lian
- Maartje Nevejan as Leen
- Leonoor Pauw as Muis
- Adelheid Roosen as Carlos
