= God Only Knows (2019 film) =

2019 Dutch film

- Film poster
- Directed by: Mijke de Jong
- Written by: Mijke de Jong
- Screenplay by: Mijke de Jong
- Produced by: Tokapi Films
- Starring: Marcel Musters; Monic Hendrickx; Elsie de Brauw
- Cinematography: Ton Peters
- Release date: 4 April 2019 (Netherlands)
- Running time: 78 minutes
- Country: Netherlands
- Language: Dutch
- Box office: $185,683

God Only Knows is a 2019 Dutch language arthouse film written and directed by Mijke de Jong. The film stars Marcel Musters as a mentally ill man, with Monic Hendrickx and Elsie de Brauw as his two sisters. Musters won a Golden Calf for Best Actor for his role.

== Plot ==
Thomas is a mentally ill man in his fifties living on his own in Amsterdam. On Maundy Thursday, he becomes confused and jumps into a canal. His loving older sister Doris immediately comes to his aid, whereas the younger sister Hannah prefers to focus on her own commitments as a photographer. Over the Easter holiday, it becomes clear that Thomas is in need of care and the tensions between the three siblings are drawn out.

== Cast ==
- Marcel Musters as Thomas
- Monic Hendrickx as Hannah, younger sister of Thomas
- Elsie de Brauw as Doris, older sister of Thomas

== Production & release ==
The producer, Topkapi Films, announced in Screen Daily in January 2018 that God Only Knows would shoot later that year. By July 2018, the film had been shot and the actors playing the three main roles had been announced, but the date of the cinematic release was still not set.

It was then confirmed that God Only Knows would premiere at the International Film Festival Rotterdam (IFFR) on 29 January 2019 and would receive a Dutch cinematic release on 4 April 2019. In its opening weekend the film took $27,015 and over its run $185,683. Since it did not receive an international release, this latter figure was also its worldwide takings.

== Critical reception ==
The film received praise from critics. The Cineuropa reviewer at IFFR praised de Jong for "approaching mental health issues and vulnerability with a certain amount of sensitivity, in a touching portrait of a condition that is rarely tackled on the big screen" and called her "a true auteur".

In the Dutch press, Volkskrant gave the film four out of five stars and lauded the acting of the three main characters. Trouw awarded three out of five stars and enjoyed the complicated portrayal of tensions in a family. The reviewer remarked that the film raised an interesting question about the foundational role of the idea of suffering in Western European culture.

God Only Knows was nominated for three Golden Calf awards, with Marcel Musters winning the Golden Calf for Best Actor.
