= Elsie de Brauw =

Dutch actress (born 1960)

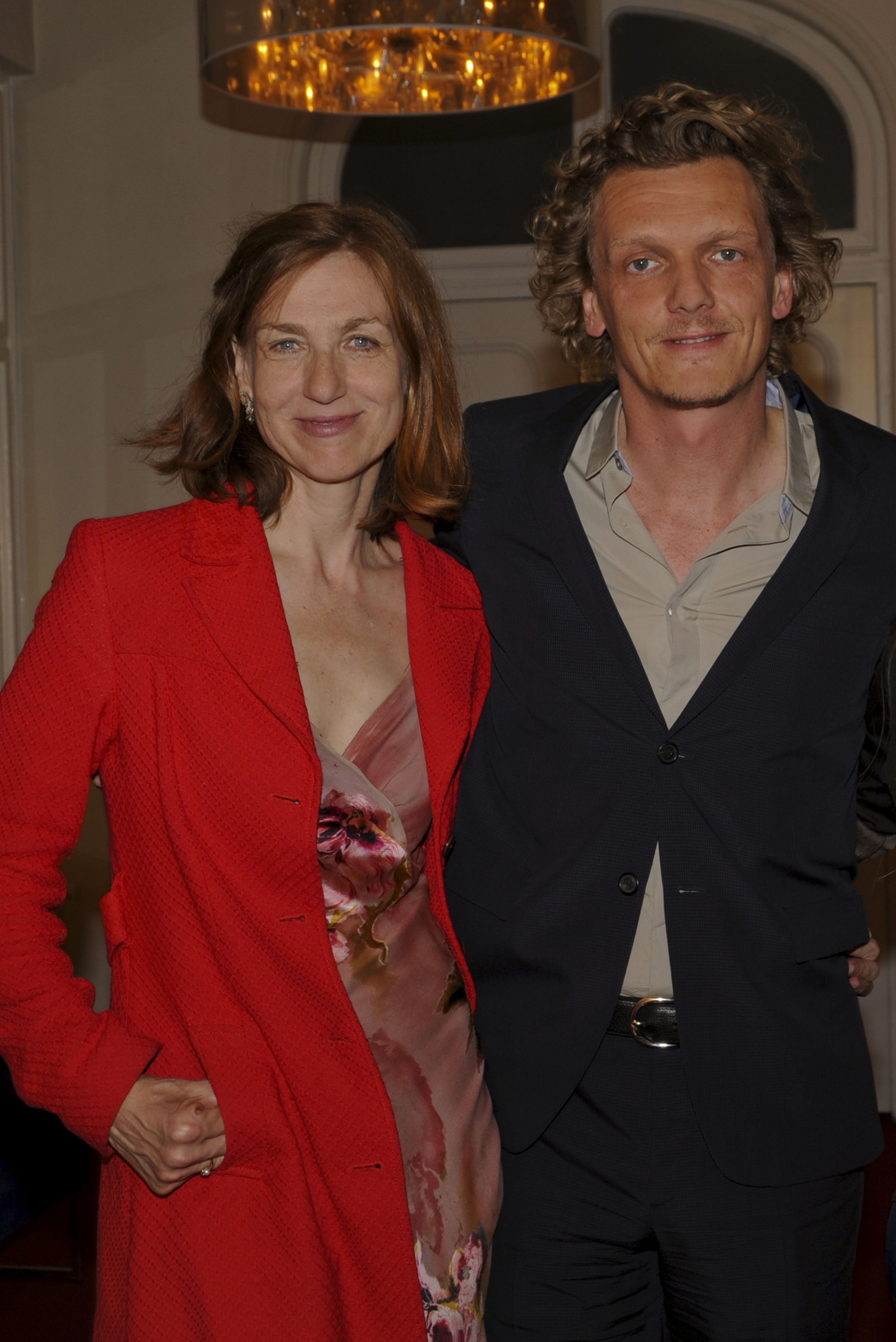
- Elsie de Brauw and Thomas Oberender (2010)
- Born: 1960 (age 64–65); The Hague, Netherlands
- Occupation: Actress

Elsie de Brauw (born 1960) is a Dutch actress.

== Early life and education ==
Elsie de Brauw was born in The Hague, The Netherlands, in 1960.

She first studied theology, and received a BA in psychology from the University of Groningen.

She then studied at the Toneelacademie Maastricht (Academy of Dramatic Arts) in Maastricht from 1984 to 1988.

== Career ==
De Brauw performed with a number of theatre companies, including Fact, Bonheur, Het Zuidelijk Toneel and was a member of the Hollandia theatre group, before joining NTGent in Ghent, Belgium. She was one of a permanent ensemble of actors retained by the company before its structure changed in 2018 under the new artistic director Milo Rau, making her debut there in De asielzoeker, directed by Johan Simons.

In 2002, she appeared in the musical Bacchanten en De Metsiers, and in 2003 in Vrijdag. In Germany, she performed with the Münchner Kammerspiele in productions of the Salzburger Festspiele and the Ruhrtriennale.

She has performed parts under the direction of many well-known stage directors, including Johan Simons, Ivo van Hove, Jossi Wieler, Alvis Hermanis, Alain Platel, and Benny Claessens.

She also acted in a number of films and television shows, both Dutch and international.

Since 2018 she has been a member of the Schauspielhaus Bochum ensemble in Bochum, Germany.

== Other activities ==
De Brauw teaches acting at the Royal Academy of Fine Arts in Ghent.

In the Netherlands, she established a foundation and primary school both called, Kunst in de klas, which she has adapted in Bochum as Künste in der Klasse.

== Awards ==
De Brauw won the Theo d'Or award twice: in 2006 and in 2011.

In 2007, she won the Golden Calf for Best Actress award for her role in the film Tussenstand, directed by Mijke de Jong.

=== Nominations and wins ===
- 2003: Nominated, Theo d'Or for best female leading role, for Bacchanten en De Metsiers
- 2006: Winner, Theo d'Or, for her role as Myrtle in Opening Night (dir. Ivo van Hove)
- 2007: Winner, Golden Calf for Best Actress (Gouden Kalf) for her role in Tussenstand (dir. Mijke de Jong) at the Netherlands Film Festival
- 2011: Winner, Theo d'Or, for her role in Gif (Gift. Eine Ehegeschichte) (dir. Johan Simons)

== Selected filmography ==
- 1995: Antonia's Line
- 1999: Mates
- 2003: Cloaca
- 2004: Bluebird
- 2017: Disappearance
- 2024: Máxima
