= Squatter's Delight =

1990 film

In Krakende Welstand
- Directed by: Mijke de Jong
- Written by: Jan Eilander, Mijke de Jong
- Release date: 23 March 1990
- Running time: 65 minutes
- Country: Netherlands
- Language: Dutch

Squatter's Delight or In Krakende Welstand is a 1990 Dutch drama film directed by Mijke de Jong. It was written by de Jong and Jan Eilander. The film was de Jong's first and she won the prize of the city of Utrecht (De Prijs van de stad Utrecht) at the Netherlands Film Days.

== Plot ==
In the early 1980s, a group of people squatted a house in central Amsterdam and then legalised it. Several years later, the city council wanted to increase the rent dramatically and people in the group responded in different ways.

== Cast ==
- Sophie Hoebrechts ... Eveline
- Ottolien Boeschoten ... Kaat
- Matthias Maat ... Michiel
- Angela van de Zon ... Hansje
- Pieter Anno ... Maurice
- Ivo Jansen op de Haar ... Paul
- Titus van der Bragt ... Martin
- Bruno van Klaveren ... Marc
- Robert Jan Birkenfeld ... Architect
- Jan Lenferink ... Bekende Nederlander
- Jeroen Planting ... Michiel

== Critical response ==
Volkskrant saw the film as giving a "nuanced" view of the squatters movement, however squatters magazine Ravage found the film disappointing.
