= Love Hurts (1993 film) =

1993 film by Mijke de Jong

- Theatrical release poster
- Directed by: Mijke de Jong
- Written by: Mijke de Jong; Jan Eilander
- Produced by: René Scholten
- Starring: Marieke Heebink; Mark Rietman
- Cinematography: Joost van Starrenburg
- Edited by: Menno Boerema
- Production company: Studio Nieuwe Gronden
- Distributed by: Shooting Star Filmdistribution
- Release date: 11 November 1993
- Running time: 85 minutes
- Country: Netherlands
- Language: Dutch

Love Hurts (Dutch Hartverscheurend) is a 1993 Dutch drama film directed by Mijke de Jong. At the 1993 Netherlands Film Festival, de Jong won the Prijs van de Nederlandse Filmkritiek for the film.

== Plot ==
In 1990s Amsterdam, Loe and Bob are in a relationship, but wanting different things. Loe is a singer who likes to party and who is also engaged in migrant support. Bob is a lawyer focused on his career. As the film progresses, the tensions in the relationship become exposed.

== Cast ==
- Marieke Heebink as Loe
- Mark Rietman as Bob
- André Arend van de Noord as Johnny
- Tanar Catalpinar as Kemal
- Roef Ragas as Maarten
- Gerrit Albada as Cameraman
- Karina De Koning as Judge
- Jan Eilander as Interviewer
- Javier Hidalgo as Ricardo
- Mientje Kleijer as Marcia
- Jerónimo Molero as Waiter
- Ruud Van der Heyde as Soundman

== Critical response ==
The critical response to the film was mixed. Variety enjoyed the "total immersion in the couple’s rocky rapport" and praised the camerawork of Joost Van Starrenburg as well as the editing by Menno Boerema. In contrast, Time Out summed it up as a "well-meaning, not unintelligent, but rather tiresome look at the volatile relationship of two ill-matched lovers".
