= Henneicke Column =

Dutch Nazi collaborators who tracked Jews

The Henneicke Column (Dutch: Colonne Henneicke) was a group of Dutch Nazi collaborators working in the investigative division of the Central Agency for Jewish Emigration (Zentralstelle für jüdische Auswanderung) in Amsterdam, during the Nazi Germany occupation of the Netherlands in World War II. Between March and October 1943 the group, led by former auto mechanic Wim Henneicke and Willem Briedé, was responsible for tracking down Jews in hiding and arresting them. The group arrested and delivered to the Nazi authorities 8,000–9,000 Jews. Most of them were deported to Westerbork concentration camp and later shipped to and murdered in Sobibor and other German extermination camps.

The bounty paid to Henneicke Column members for each captured Jew was 7.50 guilders (equivalent to about US $4.75). The group, consisting of 18 core members, disbanded on October 1, 1943. However, the Column’s leaders continued working for Hausraterfassungsstelle (Household property registration office), tracking down hidden Jewish property.

Before Nazi Germany retreated from the Netherlands in May 1945, Wim Henneicke was assassinated by the Dutch resistance in December 1944 in Amsterdam. Willem Briedé escaped the country and settled in Germany. In 1949 he was tried by a Dutch court in absentia and received the death penalty. The sentence was never carried out; Briedé died of natural causes in Germany in January 1962.

The history of the Henneicke Column was researched by Dutch journalist Ad van Liempt, who in 2002 published in the Netherlands: A Price on Their Heads, Kopgeld, Dutch bounty hunters in search of Jews, 1943.

== List of members ==
The following list is incomplete. In total there were 53 Dutch and one German working for the Column:

- Willem Christian Heinrich (Wim) Henneicke (1909-1944), liquidated by the Amsterdam resistance
- William Henry Benjamin (William) Briedé (1903-1962), sentenced to death in absentia
- Hermanus Maria Peter (Herman) Bartelsman (1881-1947), sentenced to death. Executed by firing squad March 6, 1947
- Frederik H. Meijer (1900-1947), sentenced to death. Executed by firing squad 28 March 1947
- Bernard Andreas Dries Riphagen (1909-1973), escaped, never convicted
- Sera de Croon (1916 - 1990, Amsterdam), sentenced to death, later pardoned
- Eduard Gijsbertus (Eddy) Moesbergen (1902-1980), sentenced to death, later pardoned
- Christoffel (Chris) Bout (1906), sentenced to death, later pardoned
- Hendricus Christiaan (Henk) Saatrübe (1909-1983), sentenced to death, later pardoned
- Hendrik (Henk) van der Kraan (1897), sentenced to death, later pardoned
- Martin Hinze (1913), sentenced to death, later pardoned
- Hendrik Hofman (1892), sentenced to death, later pardoned
- Diederik van der Kraan (1921), sentenced to death, later pardoned
- Jacob Rigter (1912), sentenced to death, later pardoned
- Jan Rutgers (1911), sentenced to death, later pardoned
- Hugo Berten Heinrich (1890), fled, never convicted
- Bruno Barend (Bob) Vlugt (1917), sentenced to life imprisonment
- Richard Kop
- Johan van Zeulen
- Lambert Schiffer
