= Helena van der Meulen =

Dutch screenwriter, film critic and TV writer

- Education: University of Amsterdam
- Occupations: Screenwriter, film critic, TV writer
- Awards: Golden Calf Award for Best Screenplay

Helena van der Meulen is a Dutch screenwriter, film critic and TV writer. She has won the Golden Calf Award for Best Screenplay for Joy (2010).

== Biography ==
Helena van der Meulen studied philosophy and film at the University of Amsterdam. During her studies, van der Meulen wrote film reviews for the Dutch film magazine Skrien. In September 1991, she was the head of publicity at the Dutch Film Museum.

During an interview, director Heddy Honigmann asked van der Meulen to collaborate on her next screenplay, Tot Ziens (1995). The film was critically acclaimed and won prestigious awards. Tot Ziens’ success opened the door to van der Meulen’s screenwriting career.

In the late nineties, van der Meulen was granted a stipend from the Dutch Media Fund to develop original material, including Zoenzucht (1999) for the VPRO television network. In 2002, van der Meulen’s fourth screenplay, Tussenland, was produced. It was the first Dutch film to win an award at the Rotterdam International Film Festival. In 2007, the van der Meulen scripted short Het Zusje premiered at the Cannes Film Festival.

In 2010, van der Meulen won the Golden Calf Award for Best Screenplay for Joy, a story about an orphaned young woman searching for her biological mother.

Her latest film Zurich (2015), directed by Sacha Polak – with whom van der Meulen collaborated on Hemel (2012) – has received generally positive reviews despite a lack of international recognition.

== Themes and style ==
Van der Meulen states that her films are about “characters who have to survive on their own and are trying to find out who they are, while yearning for human contact”. She emphasizes character development rather than plot. Van der Meulen generally avoids feedback and “interference” while writing. Van der Meulen chooses the directors she wishes to work with and enjoys relative creative freedom as she receives little-to-no pressure from producers.

== Selected filmography ==
- Tot Ziens (1995)
- Fl. 19,99 (1998)
- Tussenland (2002)
- Bluebird (2004)
- Het Zusje (2007)
- Joy (2010)
- Zurich (2015)
