= The Right to Know (film) =

Tasten in het duister
- Directed by: Stephan Brenninkmeijer
- Written by: Dick van den Heuvel
- Release date: 1996
- Running time: 120 minutes
- Country: Netherlands
- Language: Dutch

The Right to Know or Tasten in het duister is a 1996 Dutch film directed by Stephan Brenninkmeijer.

== Plot ==
Isn't it every child's greatest fear? That, one day, you find out that your father and mother are not your real parents at all? Press photographer Nora ten Have is a young, self-reliant woman, who's always believed she's had a happy youth. Until cracks appear in her happy memories. When she finds out that she was adopted when she was three years old, she is suddenly left without the very basis of her existence. This forces her to start searching: for her history, for what happened in the past.... but most of all, "who am I" and "where did I come from".

== Cast ==
- Cynthia Abma ... Nora ten Have
- Hidde Maas ... Peter Olaf
- Michael van Buuren ... Hans
- Kees Brusse ... Karel ten Have
- Ellis van den Brink ... Jeanne ten Have
- Leslie de Gruyter ... Terlingen
- Margot van Doorn ... Joyce
- Mark Rietman ... Felix
- Margo Dames ... Marloes Olaf
- Jaak Van Assche ... Jules
- Gaston van Erven ... Doctor Gorter
- JanAd Adolfsen ... Arno Hofstede
- Hedy Wiegner ... Annabel
- Gerda Van Roshum ... Widow of the victim
- Sjaan Duinhoven ... Heleen Olaf
