= Frailer (film) =

2014 film

- Film poster
- Directed by: Mijke de Jong
- Written by: Mijke de Jong; Jolein Laarman
- Produced by: Frans van Gestel; Ellen Havenith; Arnold Heslenfeld
- Starring: Leonor Pauw; Marnie Blok; Lieneke Le Roux; Adelheid Roosen
- Cinematography: Ton Peters
- Edited by: Dorith Vinken
- Music by: Rutger Reinders
- Release dates: 4 September 2014 (TIFF); 2 October 2014 (Netherlands)
- Running time: 89 minutes
- Country: Netherlands
- Language: Dutch

Frailer (Dutch: Brozer) is a 2014 Dutch drama film directed by Mijke de Jong. Initially intended as a sequel to her 1997 project Frail (aka Broos), the film moves from fiction to documentary as it follows the main character (played by Leonor Pauw) fighting cancer in reality. The film also stars Marnie Blok, Lieneke Le Roux and Adelheid Roosen.

Frailer was selected for screening at the 2014 Toronto International Film Festival.

Among assorted Frailer reviews, The Hollywood Reporter praised the "kind of kaleidoscopic portrait of a strong, smart, very lovable middle-aged woman facing death" but found the blurring of reality and fiction rather confusing.

== Cast ==
- Leonoor Pauw as Muis
- Marnie Blok as Ted
- Lieneke le Roux as Lian
- Adelheid Roosen as Carlos
