= Riphagen =

Riphagen: The Untouchable
- Directed by: Pieter Kuijpers
- Produced by: Pieter Kuijpers
- Starring: Jeroen van Koningsbrugge; Kay Greidanus
- Cinematography: Bert Pot
- Edited by: Herman P. Koerts
- Distributed by: September Film Distribution
- Release date: 22 September 2016
- Running time: 2h 11min
- Country: Netherlands
- Language: Dutch

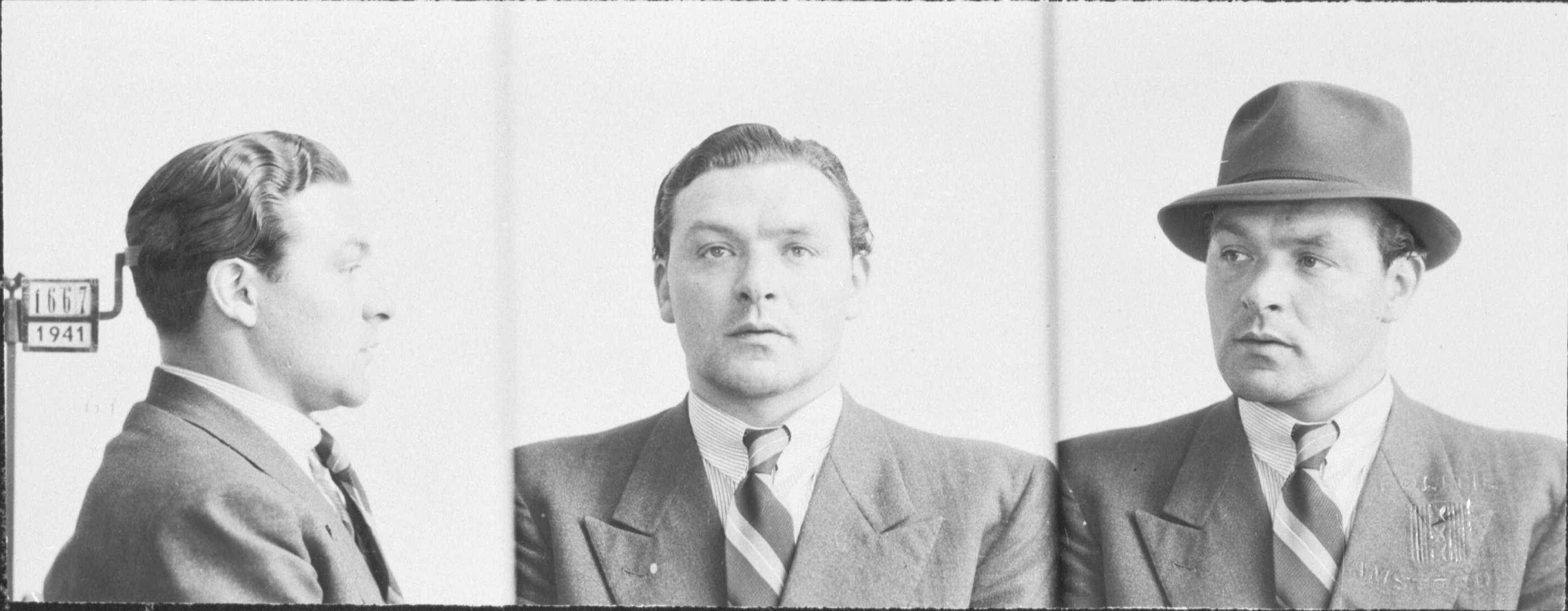
Photograph of Dries Riphagen. Police mugshots, probably made after a police arrest in 1941

Riphagen: The Untouchable (Dutch: Riphagen) is a 2016 Dutch Historical drama film directed by Pieter Kuijpers about Dries Riphagen, a Dutch criminal who collaborated with Nazi Germany.

== Plot ==
At the height of WWII in the Netherlands, Dries Riphagen and one of his associates find a Jewish woman in hiding; however, he informs the woman, Esther Schaap, that he wants to help her and other Jews in hiding, claiming because he was married to a Jewish girl who died. He treats Esther with hospitality and even has his photo taken with her, eventually gaining her trust. She tells all the other Jews she knows who are in hiding that they can trust Riphagen with their valuables.

During the Second World War, Riphagen was able to profit in a co-operation with the German occupiers as an untrustworthy ally of the German Security Service (the SD). It was his task, together with his "colleagues" from the Dutch underworld, to uncover and track down Jewish property, which was to be seized by the German government.

A young Dutch man, Jan, is part of the resistance that is led by his best friend, Gerrit van der Veen. They are able to sabotage the Nazis' agendas by posing as Nazi officers and taking away hundreds of files from a Nazi printing headquarter. Jan is very valuable to the resistance because of his position as a policeman in the SD during the Nazi occupation. The resistance group also makes fake identification cards to help their efforts in sabotaging the Nazis and collaborators.

A woman named Betje Wery, whose parents are already in a German concentration camp, is apprehended by authorities at a train station. She is threatened with deportation to the concentration camps unless she helps Riphagen and the Nazis with information on resistance members and Jews in hiding. She gives herself the alias of Bella and befriends one of Jan's resistance friends, Charly. He takes her to their meeting place, where she meets the other members, including Jan. While making out in the car, she sees Jan's SD card, fearing she's been caught, she abruptly leaves, and Jan goes home to his sleeping wife, Lena.

Riphagen eventually falls in love with a local woman, whom he meets when she is covering a work shift for her waitress sister, at a restaurant that is frequented by him. Although brutal with others, he showers Greetje with love, and she is unaware of his true nature. They eventually marry and move into a beautiful house that was stolen from its trusting Jewish owners, who were deported to a concentration camp after handing the keys over to Riphagen. Greetje thinks her husband is actually part of the Dutch resistance and is helping Jews by keeping their money and property safe until after the war.

Esther is no longer useful to Riphagen after he has managed to steal everything from her and those she's introduced to him. A very competent conman, he makes sure to take pictures with the Jews he's betrayed, so that he can use the photos as evidence after the war ends, to prove that he was part of the resistance. Esther, still naively believing Riphagen has been helping her and her friends, requests to leave Amsterdam the next day. She gives Riphagen a gold necklace with a medallion of St. Christopher. She waits for Riphagen the next day with a packed suitcase but is horrified to realize she's been conned by Riphagen. Rather than be taken to a concentration camp, she commits suicide in front of Jan by stabbing herself with the sharp end of a long hair pick that she had in her hair.

Eventually, Betje is pressured into betraying the group on their next sabotage mission, with Jan narrowly escaping the death set up himself. Another member, Frits, also manages to escape the trap, as he was the driver and realizes something is wrong as soon as he hears the gunshots. When Jan sees all of the members killed and brought out, Betje emerges, and Jan realizes she is a traitor, as well as realizing Riphagen was a part of it.

Jan goes into hiding, but the war is nearing an end, and after hearing an incorrect announcement on the radio that the Netherlands has been liberated by the Allies, he comes out of hiding. He is intent on bringing Riphagen to justice. A new group of resistance fighters, headed by a man named Sanders, seeks vigilante justice against Dutch collaborators. Frits is a part of Sanders' group.

Jan starts tracking down Riphagen, but he always manages to escape being caught. After the war, Jan is even more determined to bring Riphagen to justice; however, it's complicated by Riphagen's unbelievable good luck in avoiding being caught, his great skill of convincing and conning others, and his physical strength and ruthlessness. Greetje refuses to believe the truth about her husband, but eventually, Jan is able to convince her when he notices the St. Christopher gold necklace she is wearing. Jan shows her a picture of Esther wearing it, and she finally realizes the truth.

In the end, though, Riphagen continues to have the devil's good luck even when he is finally caught by Jan. Riphagen is able to overpower Jan, despite Jan having a gun, and ends up killing him by putting him in a chokehold. The movie ends with short text summaries about what happened to the real characters of the movie; including that Riphagen never saw his wife and son again after leaving them in Amsterdam and that he's managed to avoid capture and punishment, eventually dying in 1973 at an exclusive retirement home in Switzerland. Betje is sentenced to life in prison but is released in 1950. She dies in 2006.

== Cast ==
- Jeroen van Koningsbrugge as Dries Riphagen
- Kay Greidanus as Jan
- Sigrid ten Napel as Lena
- Mark Rietman as Louis Einthoven
- Lisa Zweerman as Greetje
- Peter Blok as Gerrit van der Veen
- Britte Lagcher as Zusje Greetje
- Huub Smit as Toon Kuijper
- Anna Raadsveld as Betje Wery
- Guido Pollemans as Harry Rond
- Michel Slymans as Wim Sanders
