= Bluebird (2004 film) =

2004 film

- Written by: Helena van der Meulen
- Directed by: Mijke de Jong
- Starring: Elske Rotteveel; Kees Scholten; Elsie de Brauw; Jaap Spijkers; Bright O'Richards
- Theme music composer: Harry de Wit; Richard Janssen
- Country of origin: Netherlands
- Original language: Dutch

Production
- Producers: Hans de Weers; Hans de Wolf
- Cinematography: Goert Giltay
- Editor: Dorith Vinken
- Running time: 77 minutes
- Production company: CoBo Fonds

Original release
- Release: 10 April 2004

Bluebird is a 2004 Dutch television film directed by Mijke de Jong. It is the first in a trilogy of films made by de Jong about young women becoming adults. The film was selected by the Netherlands as its official Foreign Language Film submission for the 78th Academy Awards, but was disqualified by the Academy of Motion Picture Arts and Sciences because it had been shown on television.

== Plot ==
Merel (Elske Rotteveel) is a 13 year old girl living in Rotterdam and looking after her younger disabled brother. She is successful at school, but hounded by a group of a classmates. As the bullying intensifies, Merel finds it hard to talk about it and her behaviour changes.

== Cast ==
- Elske Rotteveel as Merel de Leeuw
- Kees Scholten as Kasper de Leeuw
- Elsie de Brauw as Mrs. De Leeuw
- Jaap Spijkers as Mr. De Leeuw
- Bright O'Richards as Charles
- Bente de Vries as Julie
- Floris Heyne as Peer
- Carmen Otten as Kim
- Sharai Voet as Cindy
- Samir Veen as Martijn
- Ramon Lieshout as Freek

== Accolades ==
Bluebird won a Crystal Bear award at the Berlin International Film Festival. The film was selected by the Netherlands as its official Foreign Language Film submission for the 78th Academy Awards, but was rejected by the Academy of Motion Picture Arts and Sciences because it had been shown on television. The film also won the Youth Jury Award at the Toronto Sprockets International Film Festival for Children and the Grand prix de Montréal at the Montréal International Children’s Film Festival.

In 2008, VPRO rated it as de Jong's best film and stated it demonstrated her skill as a director.

== See also ==
- List of Dutch submissions for the Academy Award for Best Foreign Language Film
- List of submissions to the 78th Academy Awards for Best Foreign Language Film
