= Joy (2010 film) =

2010 Dutch film

- Theatrical release poster
- Directed by: Mijke de Jong
- Screenplay by: Helena van der Meulen
- Produced by: Frans van Gestel; Jeroen Beker; Arnold Heslenfeld
- Cinematography: Ton Peters
- Edited by: Dorith Vinken
- Music by: Rini Dobbelaar
- Production company: IDTV Film
- Distributed by: A-Film Distribution
- Release date: 8 April 2010
- Running time: 75 minutes
- Country: Netherlands
- Language: Dutch

Joy is a 2010 Dutch drama film directed by Mijke de Jong. The film premiered on 14 February 2010 at the Berlin International Film Festival. The film follows an orphaned young woman searching for her biological mother. It was the third in a trilogy of films in which de Jong followed a young female character as she became an adult.

The film won the Golden Calf for Best Feature Film award at the 2010 Netherlands Film Festival. Helena van der Meulen won the Golden Calf for Best Script award and Coosje Smid won the Golden Calf for Best Supporting Actress award for her role in the film. The film was also nominated for the Golden Calf for Best Director (Mijke de Jong), Best Actress (Samira Maas), Best Cinematography (Ton Peters) and Best Production Design (Jolein Laarman and Jorien Sont).
