= Mark Rietman =

Dutch actor (born 1960)

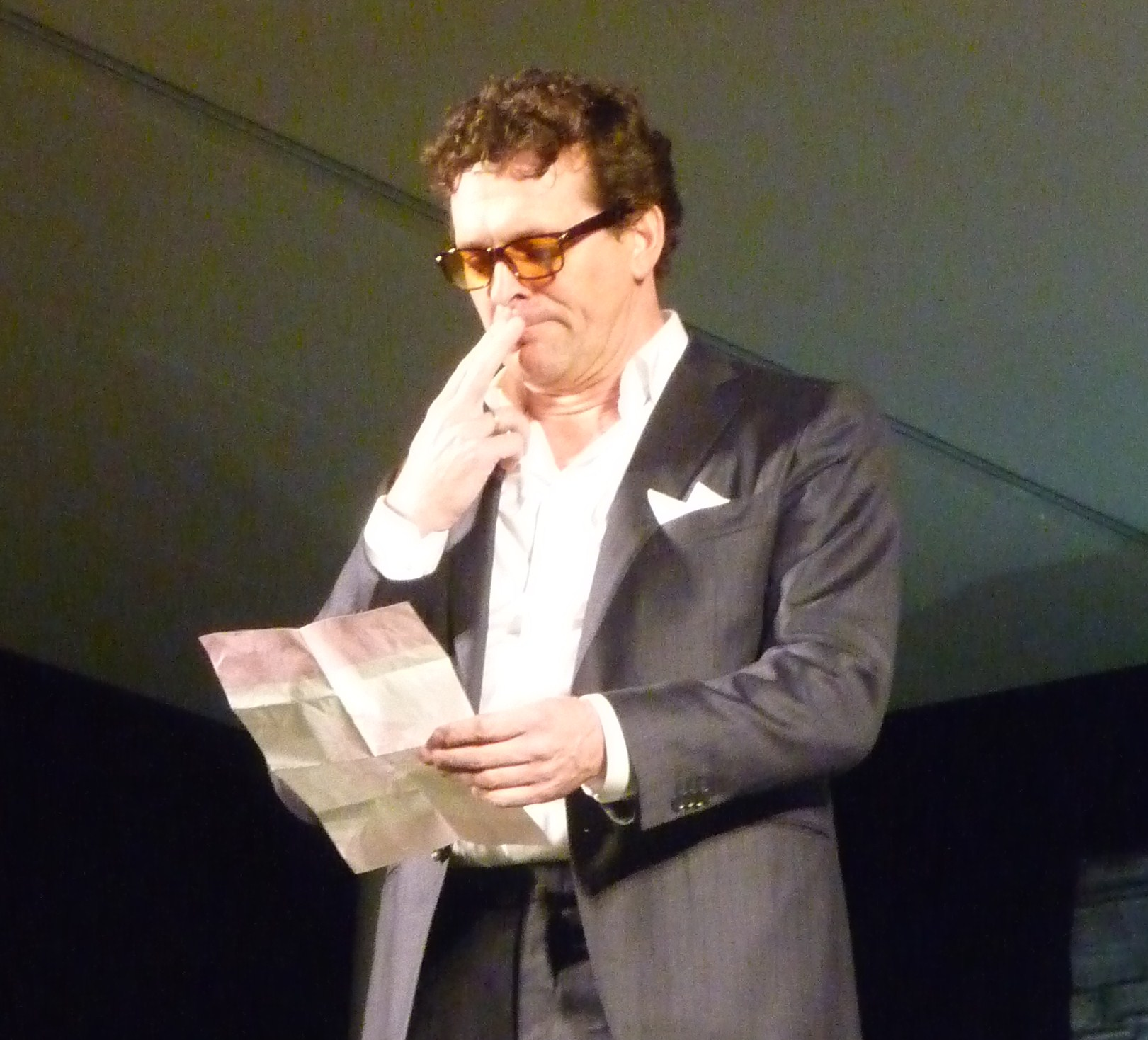
- Mark Rietman in An Ideal Husband in 2017
- Born: 28 November 1960 (age 65); Amsterdam, Netherlands
- Occupation: Actor
- Years active: 1985-present

Mark Rietman (born 28 November 1960) is a Dutch actor. He appeared in more than forty films since 1985.

== Selected filmography ==
Year	Title	Role	Notes
1993	Love Hurts	Bob	
1993	The Betrayed	Sergeon	
1994	Old Tongues	Dokter Peter Ligt	
1996	The Right to Know	Felix	
1996	Laagland	Leo	
2001	Family	Nico	
2006	Waiter	Herman	
2016	Riphagen	Louis Einthoven	
2019	Bloody Marie	Jos	
