= Laser 3.14 =

Dutch artist and poet

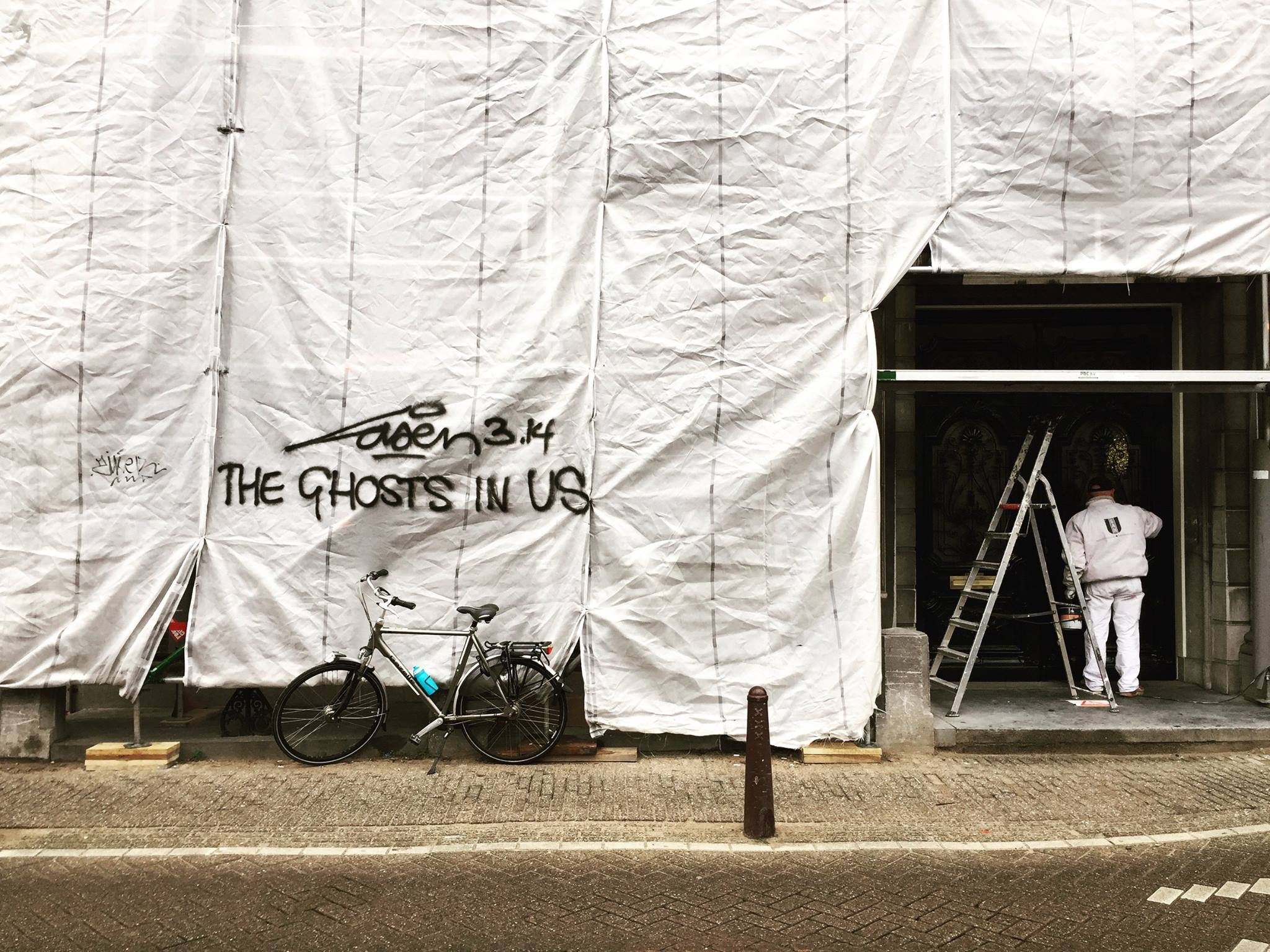
- "The Ghosts In Us" by artist Laser 3.14, Amsterdam 2016
- Known for: Street poems
- Notable work: Are you reading me?
- Style: Tagging
- Movement: Graffiti
- Website: laser314.com

Tag

Laser 3.14 is the pseudonym of an anonymous graffiti artist, painter and poet in Amsterdam, who started writing graffiti in the early 1980s at the age of about eleven.

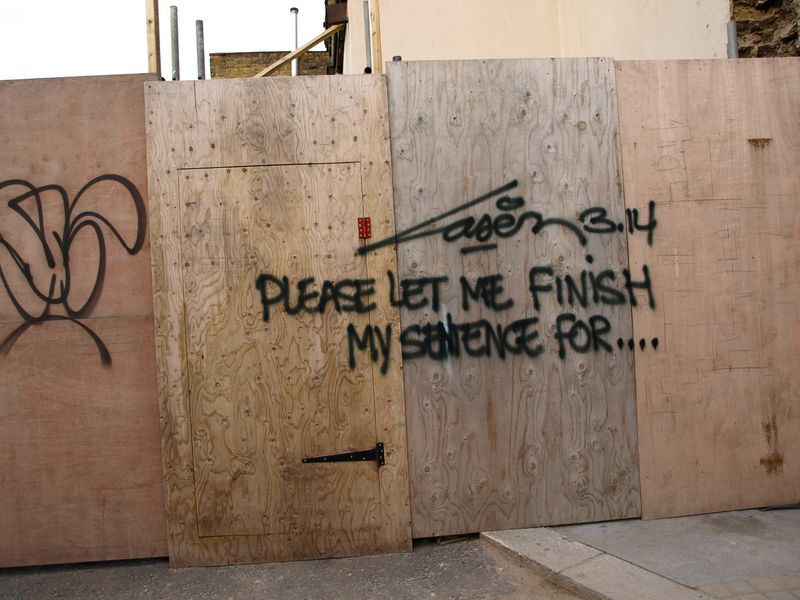
Graffiti by Laser 3.14, November 2008

== Career ==
The poet behind the tag Laser 3.14 sprays short socially critical street poems on fences and construction sites, especially in Amsterdam. His pseudonym is a reference to his love of science fiction. 3.14 here stands for Pi, which is also an abbreviation for 'Public Image'. His English poems have not gone unnoticed and he has given interviews to various media outlets. In addition to his graffiti activities, Laser 3.14 is an exhibiting artist and cartoonist. In April 2009 he published his book Are You Reading Me?

In 2018 Laser 3.14 was a guest speaker at the TED conference TEDxAmsterdam.

== Bibliography ==
- Laser 3.14 (2009). Are you reading me?. Leboswki publishers. ISBN 978-90-488-0188-6.
