= Adriana Valkenburg =

Dutch criminal (1894–1968)

- Born: 18 June 1894; Schiedam, Netherlands
- Died: 19 February 1968 (aged 73); Bergen op Zoom, Netherlands
- Other names: Jeanne de Leugenaarster (Jeanne the Liar)
- Occupations: Prostitute, brothel madam
- Known for: Collaborator in WWII
- Spouses: Jacob Stibbe (m. 1916-1928); Joop Bom (m. 1943-?)

Adriana 'Jeanne' Valkenburg (10 June 1894 - 19 February 1968), commonly called Jeanne de Leugenaarster (Jeanne the Liar) was a Dutch collaborator during World War II who worked as a prostitute and madam before the war.

== Biography ==
Valkenburg was born on 10 June 1894 in Schiedam as the fourth of fourteen children of Jacob Valkenburg and Adriana Cornelia de Ligt. She had a difficult childhood. Her strictly religious father was violent, while her mother neglected the upbringing of the children. She first came into contact with the police in 1911 when she stole a gold ring.

In 1916 she married the Jewish businessman Jacob (Jack) Stibbe. However, Stibbe disappeared without a trace after a short time. The divorce was not made official until twelve years later.

She moved to Amsterdam in 1920, where she established herself as a prostitute and madam. In the 1920s and 1930s she became a well-known figure in the Amsterdam underworld. At that time she was nicknamed 'Jeanne the Liar', because she was considered unreliable. She was regularly arrested for prostitution, drunkenness, fights and other offences.

In 1931 she started a relationship with the Jewish businessman Jacob Acohen. At first he was her client, later they started a love affair.

=== WW2 ===
Valkenburg and Acohen were to be married on 2 April 1942 but Acohen was arrested by the Sicherheitsdienst on 17 March. He died on 29 June 1942 in Mauthausen concentration camp.

During the war, Valkenburg was an opportunist. In 1942, she helped Jews find a hiding place in her own house on the Van Ostadestraat for financial compensation. When she was arrested for this in 1943, she started working as a V-Frau for the occupiers. In order to avoid prosecution, she had to report Jews to the notorious Bureau Joodsche Zaken. It is said that she betrayed several dozen people in this way.

Valkenburg moved to Zuider Amstellaan in 1943 after a fellow collaborator had been executed by the resistance. When she moved, she met the handyman Joop Bom, who used the alias Gerritsen, with whom she had a relationship and married on 16 November 1943. The couple worked together betraying Jews for profit.

After Mad Tuesday, Valkenburg fled with her partner to Bergen op Zoom, where her sister lived. The couple was arrested there, after being informed on by her sister, on 31 March 1945 and taken to the Meilust internment camp.

=== Post-war ===
After the war, Valkenburg was sentenced to death after a long trial but the sentence was subsequently commuted to life imprisonment. In 1960, she was released early and lived until her death at various addresses in Amsterdam and Putte.

In the 1960s, Valkenburg ended up in a wheelchair due to severe obesity. She was eventually admitted to the Algemeen Burger Gasthuis, a catholic infirmary, in Bergen op Zoom, where she died on 19 February 1968.
