= Gerbrandy =

Gerbrandy is a West Frisian patronymic surname. Notable people with the surname include:

- Pieter Sjoerds Gerbrandy (1885–1961), Dutch politician
- Gerben-Jan Gerbrandy (born 1967), Dutch politician

== See also ==
- Gerbrandy Tower, radio tower in IJsselstein, Netherlands
