= Nora El Koussour =

Dutch actress (born 1994)

- Born: 1994 (age 30–31); Veghel, Netherlands
- Occupation: Actress
- Years active: 2016 – present
- Awards: Golden Calf for Best Actress 2017 Layla M.

Nora El Koussour (born 1994) is a Dutch actress. She won the Golden Calf for Best Actress award in 2017 for her role in the film Layla M..

== Career ==
She made her film debut in the 2016 film Layla M.. She won the Golden Calf for Best Actress award in 2017 for her role in the film. The film was selected as the Dutch entry for the Best Foreign Language Film at the 90th Academy Awards, but it was not nominated as a finalist.

Nora appeared in the 2019 film, The Promise of Pisa, portraying character Mina Zafar. In 2020, she appeared as Sanaa in the British crime thriller television series Baghdad Central. She also appeared in the Dutch television series Kerstgezel.nl. In 2022, she appeared as Emma Watson in the play Emma Watson - The Play.

== Awards ==
- 2017: Golden Calf for Best Actress, Layla M.

== Filmography ==
- 2016: Layla M.
- 2017: Aziza
- 2018: Mocro Maffia
- 2019: The Promise of Pisa
- 2020: Kerstgezel.nl
