= Louis Einthoven =

Dutch lawyer (1896–1979)

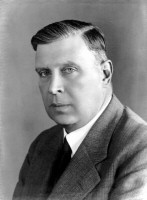
- Born: 30 March 1896; Soerabaja, Dutch East Indies
- Died: 29 May 1979 (aged 83); Lunteren, Netherlands
- Known for: Founder of BNV

Louis Einthoven (30 March 1896 – 29 May 1979) was a Dutch lawyer and the co-founder of Nederlandsche Unie. After the war, Einthoven was put in charge of Bureau Nationale Veiligheid, which was renamed Binnenlandse Veiligheidsdienst. He was born in Soerabaja and died in Lunteren.

== Biography ==
=== Chinese Deportations ===
At the end of 1933, Einthoven left the Dutch East Indies and resettled in the Netherlands. On December 29 of that year he became chief commissioner of police in Rotterdam. In the 1930s, Einthoven hated the politics of pillarization in the Netherlands. As a police commissioner, he also disliked the large number of Chinese people in his city and therefore introduced two categories of Chinese: a category that was considered to have an economic value and allowed to settle in the Netherlands and a category "excess Chinese" who had no rights and had to be sent 'back' to China as soon as possible. Because of him, of the estimated 3000 Chinese in the Netherlands, more than 1000 were expelled from the country with government support.

=== Police Commissioner during the occupation ===
On 14 May 1940, two Dutch soldiers captured three Germans in civilian clothes behind the Rotterdam front line. On the orders of a Dutch officer the three Germans, who were being held on the Schiekade, a street north of the Rotterdam city center, were shot as spies. One of the Germans survived and after the Dutch defeat the German occupation authorities ordered an investigation. Police commissioner Einthoven managed to trace the two Dutch soldiers and handed them over to the Germans, resulting in two death sentences (later converted to "discipline house"). In 1956 the investigation was described as an overzealous action by Van Einthoven and its concealment as a cover-up.

=== After the war ===
Einthoven was liberated in September 1944 in Kamp Sint-Michielsgestel, where he had been staying since May 1942. In the south of the Netherlands, which had already been liberated, he came into contact with Prince Bernhard. In February 1945 he contacted Queen Wilhelmina in London. Prime Minister Pieter Gerbrandy wanted to give him a minister post, but he refused. After the war, Einthoven was put in charge of the Bureau Nationale Veiligheid, which was renamed Binnenlandse Veiligheidsdienst (BVD) in 1946.

Shortly after the war, Einthoven was informed by the counterintelligence department of the British Secret Intelligence Service that Anton van der Waals was working for them in Germany. During the war, Van der Waals had been active for the German Sicherheitsdienst and had betrayed a large number of resistance members. He was one of the most wanted Dutch collaborators at the time, something the British had not realized. Einthoven reacted with shock: "This man is the enemy number one of all of us.

At the same time, he forbade his subordinates to actively hunt Van der Waals. Over time, rumors increased that Van der Waals was working for the British. Behind the scenes, Einthoven urged the British to extradite him to the Netherlands, but he kept his mouth shut publicly.

In 1961 Einthoven retired. He published his memoir in 1974 and died five years later at the age of 83 in Lunteren.

== Movie ==
In September 2016, Riphagen, a film about the life of Dries Riphagen, premiered. The film is based on the book of the same name by journalists Bart Middelburg and René ter Steege. In the film, Einthoven is played by Mark Rietman.

== Bibliography ==
- Heeft de afwezige ongelijk?: getuigenis van mr. L. Einthoven over de Nederlandse Unie, Semper Agendo, Apeldoorn, 1973, ISBN 90-6086-586-3
- Tegen de stroom in: levende vissen zwemmen tegen de stroom in, alleen de dooie drijven mee (1974) ISBN 90-6086-596-0
- Jan. H. Kompagnie, 'Einthoven, Louis (1896-1979)', in Biografisch Woordenboek van Nederland
