= Katia's Sister =

- Theatrical release poster
- Het zusje van Katja
- Directed by: Mijke de Jong
- Screenplay by: Jan Eilander; Jolien Laarman
- Based on: La hermana de Katia by Andrés Barba
- Produced by: Hans de Wolf
- Starring: Betty Qizmolli; Julia Seijkens; Olga Louzgina
- Cinematography: Ton Peters
- Edited by: Dorith Vinken
- Music by: Leo Anemaet
- Distributed by: A-Film Distribution
- Release date: 8 August 2008
- Running time: 85 minutes
- Country: Netherlands
- Language: Dutch
- Box office: $6,751

Katia's Sister (Dutch: Het Zusje van Katia) is a 2008 film directed by Mijke de Jong. It was adapted by Jan Eilander and Jolien Laarman from a 2001 novel written by Andrés Barba. The film premiered at the Netherlands Film Festival and won two Golden Calf awards.

== Plot ==
Lucia is a young woman living in Amsterdam. She idolises her beautiful older sister Katia, who is drifting towards the sex industry. Their mother is from Russia and works as a sex worker in the red-light district.

== Cast ==
- Betty Qizmolli as Lucia, Katia's sister
- Julia Seijkens as Katia
- Olga Louzgina as the mother of Lucia and Katia
- Ian Bok as John Turner
- Marwan Kenzari as Giac

== Production ==
The film was adapted by Jan Eilander and Jolien Laarman from the 2001 novel La hermana de Katia by Andrés Barba, moving the setting from Madrid to Amsterdam. It was the second in a trilogy of films directed by Mijke de Jong about young women becoming adults. She commented that "all my films are about showing characters compassionately".

It premiered on August 8, 2008 at the Stadsschouwburg in Utrecht during the Netherlands Film Festival. At the festival, the film was nominated for six awards, winning the Golden Calf for Best Script and the Golden Calf for Best Supporting Actress. It won the Silver Giraldillo, a prize worth 30,000 euros, at the Seville European Film Festival. The film was also nominated for a Golden Leopard and won the Special Mention Award from the Youth Jury at the Locarno International Film Festival.

The worldwide takings for the film were $6,751.

== Critical response ==
The response of Dutch films critics was mixed. NU.nl preferred the book to the film, whilst conceding that it is hard to film the world of the sex worker. Volkskrant praised how de Jong depicted the complicated relationships between the two sisters and their mother. De Filmkrant was impressed by the "sophisticated film-making" of de Jong and VPRO noted that what could have been a harrowing tale in the same way as Lilya 4-ever was instead a "sensitive and restrained" story.

Internationally, The Hollywood Reporter praised the direction of de Jong and the acting of Qizmolli, calling the film an "observant snapshot" of a young woman's life.
