= Mijke de Jong =

Dutch film director

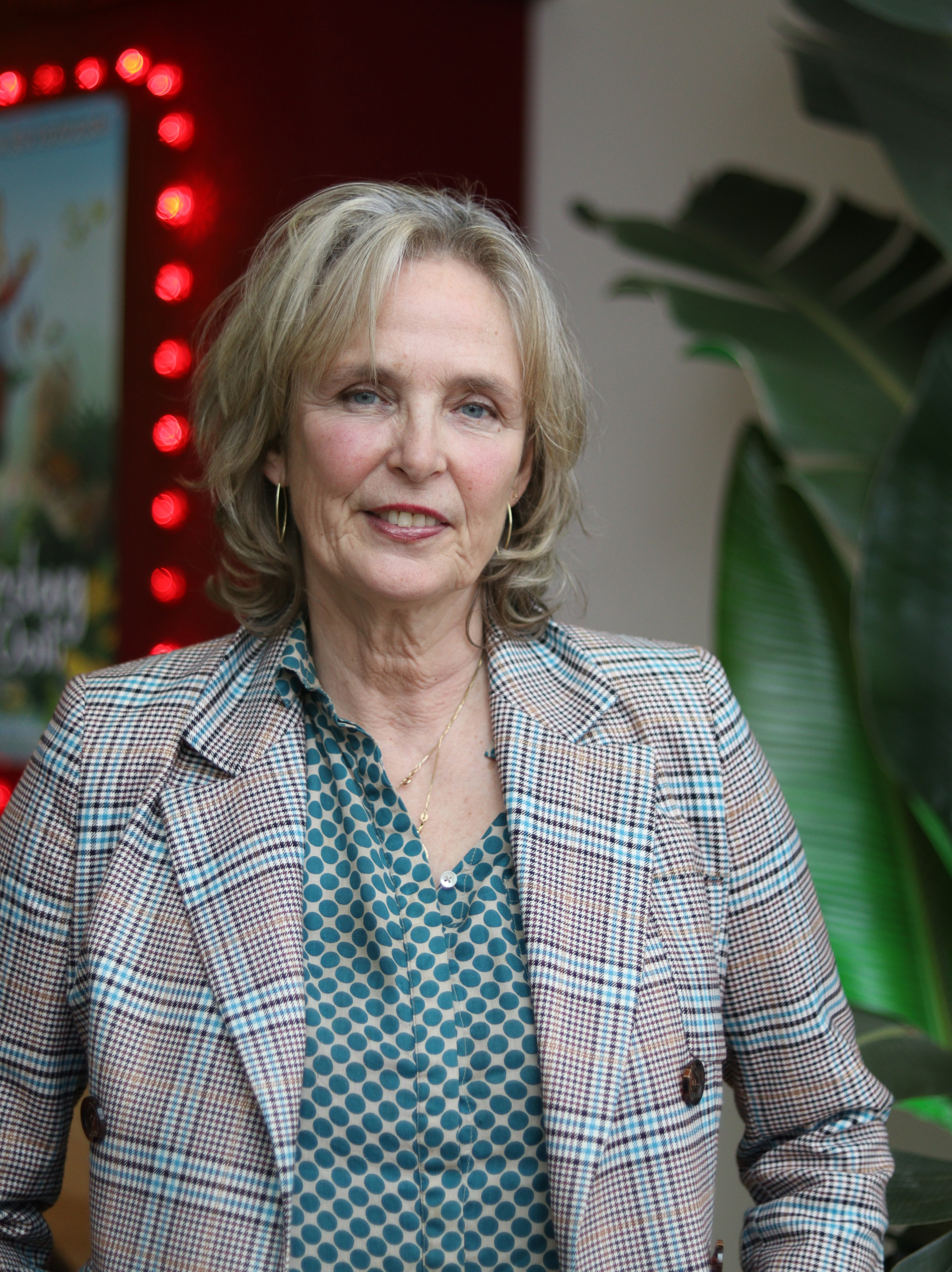
- Born: 23 September 1959 (age 66); Rotterdam, Netherlands
- Occupations: Film director, screenwriter and producer

Mijke de Jong (born 23 September 1959) is a Dutch film director, screenwriter and producer. She is known for creating films such as Bluebird (2004), Frailer (2014), Layla M. (2016) and God Only Knows (2019). Layla M. was selected as the 2018 Dutch entry for the Academy Award for Best International Feature Film.

== Early life ==
De Jong was born on 23 September 1959 in Rotterdam, the Netherlands. She moved in 1978 to Amsterdam, where she studied at the Netherlands Film Academy. During her time as a student at the Netherlands Film Academy she was part of the Dutch radical activist group “Onkruit”. The group aimed its actions against the army, nuclear weapons and the weapons industry in general; they fought for an open (military) policy. She had to quit participating in order to remain a student at the Film Academy.

== Career ==
The themes in the films that De Jong directs relate to everyday life in society. Her work centres on topics including bullying, family problems, feeling as though you do not belong, and death. She portrays emotions that accompany these struggles. Her filming techniques are seemingly similar to the filming of a documentary. She uses many close-ups of the actors.

Mijke de Jong joined a project funded by the Netherlands Film Fund (Nederlands Filmfonds). With this project, filmmakers try to tighten the bonds with other film countries. This policy plan is intended to fill the financial gaps that small film productions have to deal with, to promote the Dutch scene as a place for filming and to create more opportunities for national actors. In 2018, de Jong served on the jury for the Shooting Stars Award.

== Selected films ==
Layla M. (2016) is about a young Moroccan woman (played by Nora El Koussour) who was born and raised in Amsterdam, Netherlands. Against the wishes of her parents, she finds herself engaging more and more in radical Islamic activities and eventually flees to Jordan. The film was selected as the Dutch entry for the 2018 Academy Award for Best International Feature Film.

Stages (Dutch: Tussenstand) (2007) represents the story of Isaac (Stijn Koomen), a child of divorced parents (Elsie de Brauw and Marcel Musters). Isaac is a very reserved person who does not speak much. His parents are concerned about his behaviour and decide to have a talk about him over dinner. This however leads to heated discussions about personal issues, resulting in disagreeing about everything the other has to say.

Bluebird (2004) is a film made for television about bullying. Thirteen year old Merel (Elske Rotteveel) is a smart girl living in Rotterdam who is devoted to taking care of her disabled younger brother. This gives her classmates a reason to make fun of her.

Broos (1997) is about five sisters (played by Marnie Blok, Lieneke le Roux, Maartje Nevejan, Leonoor Pauw and Adelheid Roosen) who come together to think of a present for the anniversary of their parents. Before being turned into a movie, this story had already being released in theatre in 1995.

Love Hurts (Dutch: Hartverscheurend) (1993) tells the story of Loe (Marieke Heebink) and Bob (Mark Rietman), who are in a relationship but differ in many ways. The story takes place in Amsterdam during the 1990s and the film contains themes of conflict, love, race, change and commitment. It was written by Jan Eilander and Mijke de Jong.

== Filmography ==
Year	Title	Function	Notes
1989	In krakende welstand	Director & Screenwriter	De Prijs van de stad Utrecht at the Netherlands Film Festival.
1993	Hartverscheurend (Love Hurts)	Director & Screenwriter	At the Netherlands Film Festival, de Jong was awarded the Prijs van de Nederlandse Filmkritiek.
1994	Still you	Director	
1994	The Four A.M. Feed	Director	
1995	Frans en Duits	Screenwriter	
1995	Stills	Director & Screenwriter	Short Film
1996	Lieve Aisja	Director, Screenwriter & Producer	
1997	Broos (Frail)	Director & Screenwriter	All five actresses won the Golden Calf for Best Actress
1997	De gordel van smaragd	Screenwriter	
1998	Het labyrint	Director	Thirteen part television series
1999	Kussen	Screenwriter	
1999	Lopen	Director & Screenwriter	
2001	Uitgesloten	Director	
2004	Bluebird	Director	Television film. Selected as the Dutch entry for the Academy Award for Best International Feature Film at the 78th Academy Awards
2005	Allerzielen	Director	Short Film
2007	Tussenstand (Stages)	Director & Screenwriter	Three Golden Calfs (Gouden Kalf) with Stages (Tussenstand), including best director.
2008	Katia's Sister (Het zusje van Katia)	Director	Winner of the Golden Calf for Best Script and the Golden Calf for Best Supporting Actress.
2010	Joy	Director	Nominated for seven Golden Calves, won three.
2014	Brozer (Frailer)	Director & Screenwriter	
2015	Fiftyfifty	Director	
2016	Stop Acting Now	Director & Screenwriter	A collaboration with Wunderbaum theatre collective.
2016	Layla M.	Director & Screenwriter	Selected as the Dutch entry for the 2018 Academy Award for Best International Feature Film; Winner of two Golden Calf awards.
2019	God Only Knows	Director & Screenwriter	Winner of one Golden Calf award

== Awards ==
- 1989: Prize of the City of Utrecht (Prijs van de stad Utrecht) for In Krakende Welstand.
- 1993: Swissair/Crossair Special Prize at the Locarno Festival for Love Hurts.
- 1993: Prize of the Dutch Film Critics (Prijs van de Nederlandse Filmkritiek) for Love Hurts (Hartverscheurend).
- 2005: Crystal Bear award at the Berlin International Film Festival for Bluebird.
- 2007: Golden Calf for Best Director and Prize of the Dutch Film Critics (Prijs van de Nederlandse Filmkritiek) for Tussenstand
