= Albert Jurardus van Prooijen =

Dutch painter

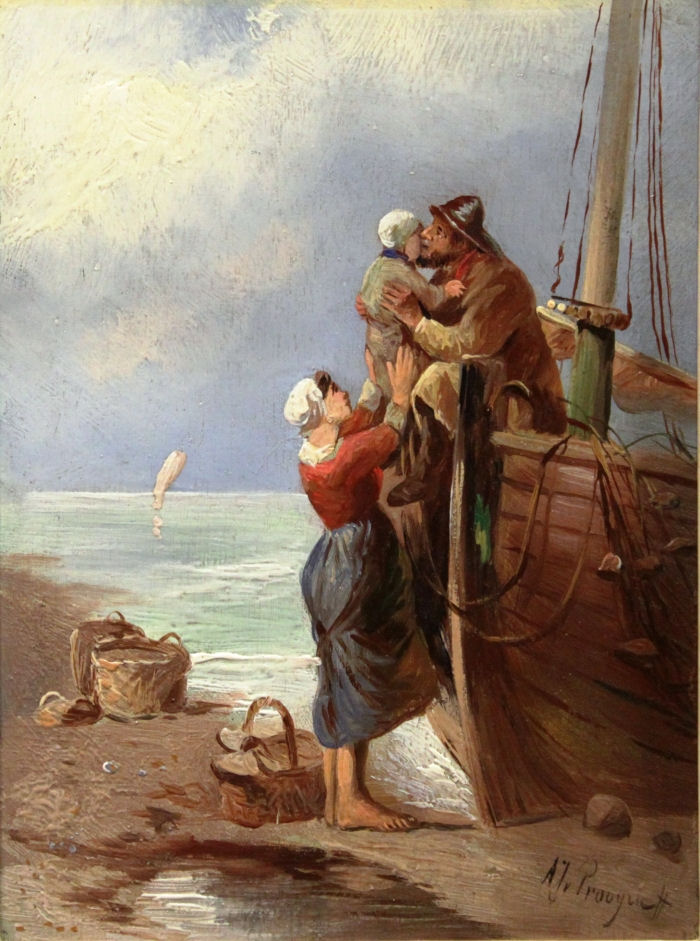
The Farewell Kiss

Albert Jurardus van Prooijen (7 September 1834, Groningen - 31 October 1898, Amsterdam) was a Dutch painter of cityscapes, landscapes (often with animals) and genre scenes.

== Biography ==
His father was the decorative painter Johannes van Prooijen (1801-1871). At the age of thirteen, he was enrolled at the Academie Minerva, where he studied with Jacob Bruggink and Jan Ensing. After graduating, he worked at his father's business.

Soon, however, he began participating in local exhibitions and, in 1853, was awarded the "Grote Koninklijke Medaille" for painting. In 1858, his work "Rural Simplicity" won an award from Pictura, the local art society, and he was commissioned to do a series of watercolors depicting the interior and exterior of the Groene Weeshuis, a 17th-century orphanage that was due to be demolished. Three years later, he provided a series of cityscape drawings for the lithographer, Carel Christiaan Antony Last, who published them as the Album der stad Groningen.

From 1864 to 1865, he temporarily served as Headmaster of the Academie Minerva, following the resignation of Johannes Hinderikus Egenberger, who later had a change of mind and returned. According to Franciscus Hermanus Bach, a friend of Egenberger's, Prooijen didn't receive a permanent position as a teacher because he had a drinking problem.

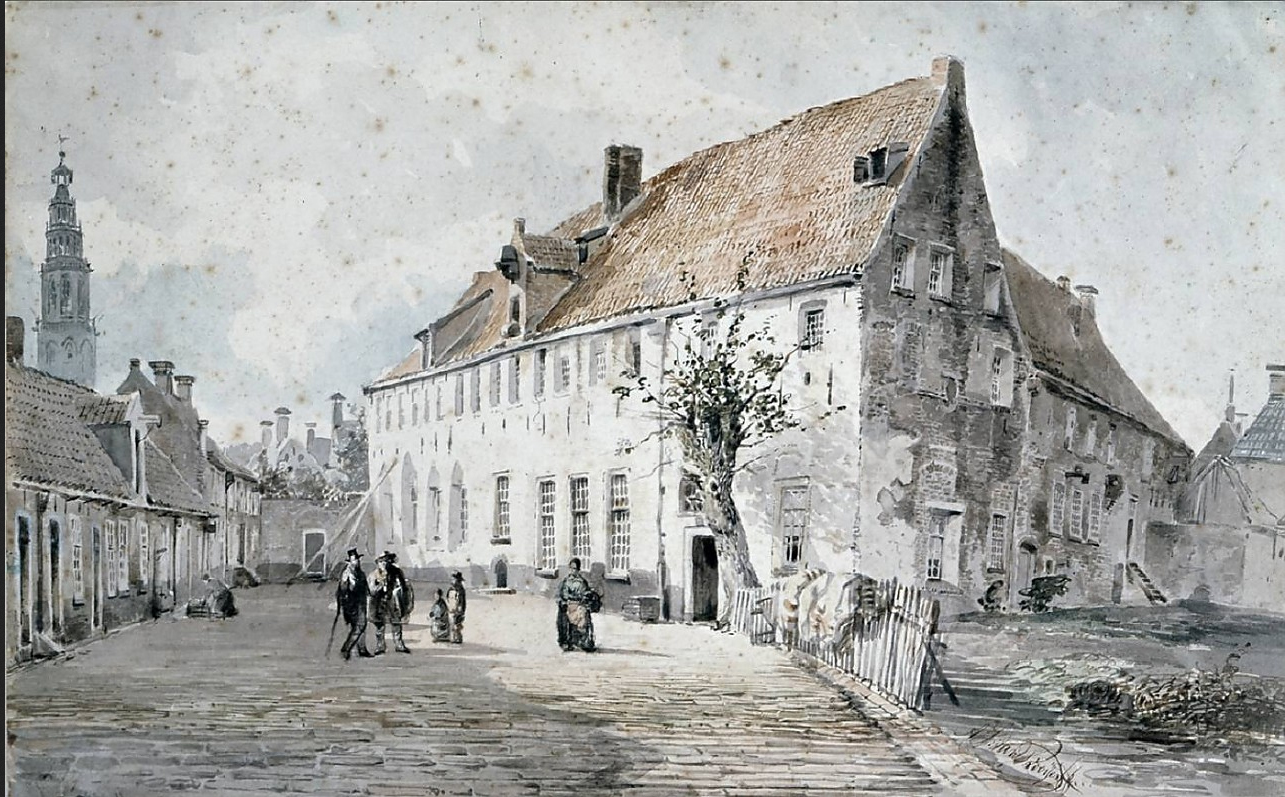
The Groene Weeshuis (1858)

He was married in 1868, to a woman twelve years his junior. The following year, he and his family (which would eventually number seven children) settled in Amsterdam, where he switched from cityscapes to landscapes and river views.

He had an uneventful career, and died there at the age of sixty-four. In 1997, anticipating the 100th anniversary of his death, a major retrospective was held at the Fraeylemaborg in Slochteren.
