= Maria van Schooten =

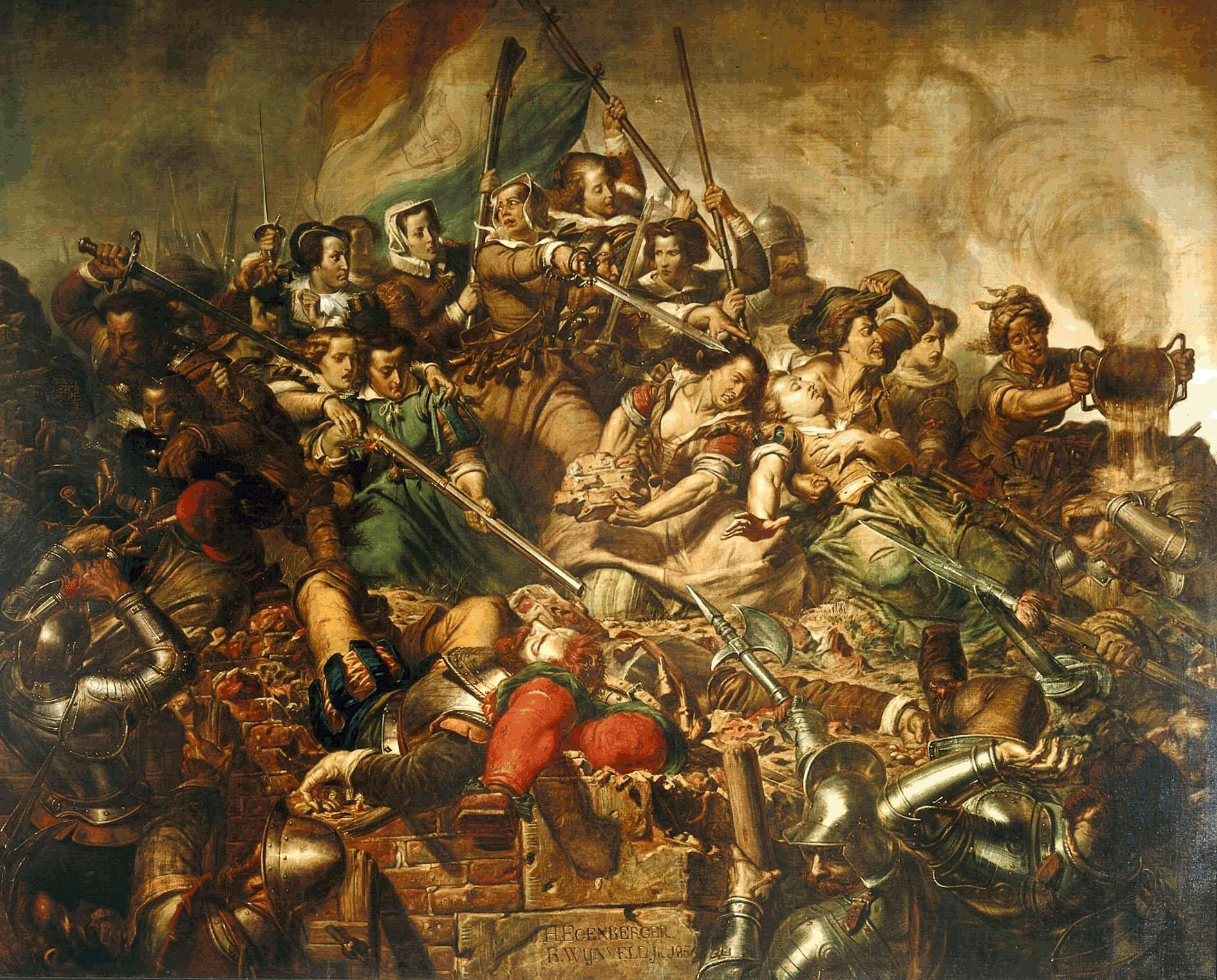
- Kenau leading a group of 300 women in defense of Haarlem, by Barend Wijnveld and J. H. Egenberger, 1854
- Born: 1555
- Died: 1573 (aged 17–18)
- Military career
- Allegiance: Dutch
- Conflicts: Siege of Haarlem

Maria van Schooten (1555–1573) was a Dutch woman involved in the Eighty Years' War. She died from the injuries she received after having participated in the defense during the Siege of Haarlem and was given a public funeral with full military honors. She is believed to have been one of the women led by Kenau Simonsdochter Hasselaer, a legendary heroine who helped defend Haarlem against the Spanish invaders.

Two centuries after her brief life, van Schooten was included in the Vaderlandsch woordenboek, the national dictionary started by bookseller Jacobus Kok in 1780.
