= Johan Christopher Toll =

Swedish statesman and soldier (1743–1817)

Field Marshal Count Johan Christopher Toll
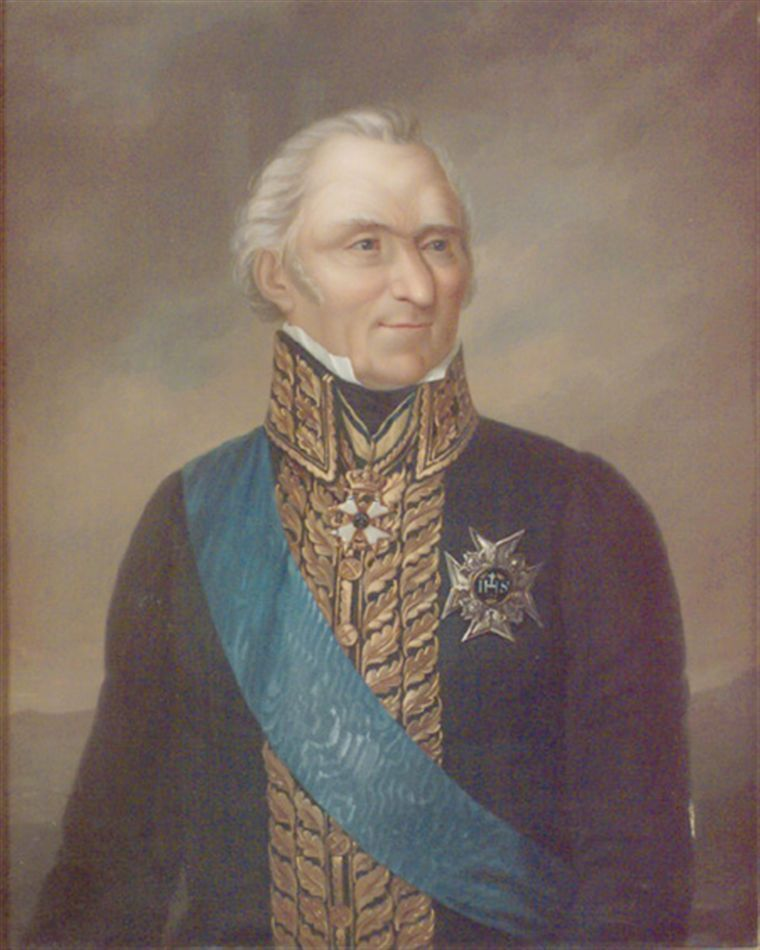
- Johan Christopher Toll in Field Marshal's uniform, with the ribbon of the Royal Order of the Seraphim over his shoulder with the Star of the Order on his chest. Around his neck he wears a Commander's Cross for the Order of the Sword. Painting by Johan Way.
- Born: Johan Christopher Toll; 1 February 1743; Mölleröd Castle, Skåne, Sweden
- Died: 21 May 1817 (aged 74); Bäckaskog Castle, Skåne, Sweden
- Military career
- Allegiance: Sweden
- Branch: Swedish Army
- Service years: 1758–1817
- Rank: Field Marshal
- Conflicts: Pomeranian War; Revolution of 1772; Revolution in Christianstad; Russo-Swedish War (1788–1790); Napoleonic Wars
- Awards: Royal Order of the Seraphim; Order of the Sword; Lord of the Realm
- Other work: Governor-general of Scania

Count Johan Christopher Toll (1 February 1743 – 21 May 1817) was a Swedish statesman and soldier.

== Early life ==
He was born in Mölleröd, Scania (now part of Hässleholm Municipality, Skåne County). Toll came of from an old family of Dutch origin, which can be traced back to the 13th century. They migrated to the Baltic provinces in the 16th century.

Toll's father was one of Charles XII's soldiers, his mother being a descendant of the aristocratic Gyllenstjerna family. In his youth, Johan Christopher served during the Seven Years' War, and then, exchanging the military for civil service, became head ranger of Kristianstad County.

== Royal conspirator ==
During the Riksdag of 1771–1772, the "Cap" faction, which were the dominant one at the time, deprived him of his position as ranger, and Toll, guessing that the king was preparing a revolution, almost forced his services on the conspirators. Georg Magnus Sprengtporten, one of the main instigators of the plot, declaring that someone uninitiated into the scheme who seemingly knew about their plans must either "be killed or bribed". Toll was assigned one of the more difficult parts of the enterprise - to secure the southern fortress of Kristianstad. Two days after the coronation of Gustav III, on 21 May 1772, he set forth from Stockholm with twenty-two pounds of silver with which to bribe the garrison into revolting in the name of the king. He had no credentials, and the little that was known about him locally was not to his benefit. In the fortress garrison itself, there was only one man known to be a royalist, namely, Captain Abraham Hellichius. He reached Kristianstad on 21 June and managed to first win over Hellichius, and, six weeks later on 12 August, the rest of the garrison. Toll arrested the few officers which proved recalcitrant, taking possession of the records and military chest, and then closing the gates to the "Cap" high commissioner who had been warned by the English minister, John Gooderich, that something was afoot in the south. Seven days later, Gustav III's coup d'état in Stockholm completed the revolution.

== Political career ==
Toll was generously rewarded and more frequently employed as his genius as an administrator and his blameless integrity came to light. His reforms in the commissariat department were epoch-making, and the superior mobility of the Swedish forces under Gustav III was due entirely to his initiative. However, it was upon Toll's boundless audacity that Gustav mainly relied. Thus as Gustav, under the pressure of circumstances, inclined more and more towards absolutism, it was upon Toll that he principally leant. In 1783, Toll was placed at the head of the secret "Commission of National Defence" which ruled Sweden during the king's absence abroad without the privity of the Council. It was he who persuaded the king to summon the Riksdag of 1786, which he failed to control, and in all Gustav's plans for forcing on a war with Russia, Toll was initiated from the first. In 1786, he had already risen to the rank of major-general and was Gustav's principal adjutant. It was against Toll's advice, however, that Gustav, in 1788, began the war with Russia. Toll had always insisted that, in such a contingency, Sweden should be militarily and diplomatically prepared, but this was far from the case. Nevertheless, when the inevitable first disasters happened, Toll was, most unjustly, made a scapegoat, but the later successes of the war were largely due to his care and diligence as commissary-general. After the death of Gustav III, Toll was for a short time war minister and commander-in-chief in Scania and, subsequently, was sent as ambassador to Warsaw. Unjustly involved in the so-called "Armfelt conspiracy", he was condemned to two years imprisonment, but was fully reinstated when in 1796 Gustav IV attained his majority. At the Riksdag at Norrköping in 1800, he was elected marshal of the Diet (Lantmarskalk), and led the royalist party with consummate ability. On this occasion, he forced the mutinous nobility or riddarhuset to accept the detested Act of Union and Security by threatening to reveal the names of all the persons suspected of complicity in the murder of the late king. He subsequently displayed great diplomatic adroitness in his negotiations with the powers concerning Sweden's participation in the war against Napoleon.

== Military commander ==
In the Franco-Swedish War, Toll assisted in the defence of Stralsund. The fortress was compelled to surrender on 20 August by Marshal Brune, whereupon the Swedish army of 13,000 men, which had retired to Rügen, seemed irretrievably lost. It was saved by Toll, who cajoled the French marshal into a convention whereby the Swedish army, with all its munitions of war, was permitted to return unmolested to Sweden on 7 September 1807. For this exploit, Toll received his marshal's baton. It was in the camp of Toll, then acting commander-in-chief in Scania, that Gustavus IV was about to take refuge when the western army rebelled against him, but he was arrested in the capital before he could do so. Toll retained his high position under Bernadotte, who, in 1814, created him a count. He died unmarried.
