= Marie Antoinette Petersén =

Swedish musician (1771–1855)

Maria Antonia "Marie Antoinette" Petersén née Crux, (1771–1855), was a Swedish musician (violinist) and singer. She was a member of the Royal Swedish Academy of Music.

Marie Antoinette Petersén was born in Germany, possibly in Mannheim. In 1795, she married the Swedish miniaturist Jacob Axel Gillberg and moved with him to Gothenburg. After one and a half year, she was abandoned by Gillberg. She supported herself by keeping a girl's pension and by giving concerts. She was a singer and played the piano, but she was most admired as a violinist. In 1801 and 1802, she performed for Gustav IV Adolf of Sweden during his visit to Gothenburg. In 1802, she divorced Gillberg and remarried Johan Andreas Petersén, the son of a rich merchant in Gothenburg.

Marie Antoinette Petersén was elected member of the Swedish Royal Academy of Music in 1801.
