= Charles Le Clercq =

Dutch portrait painter (1753–1821)

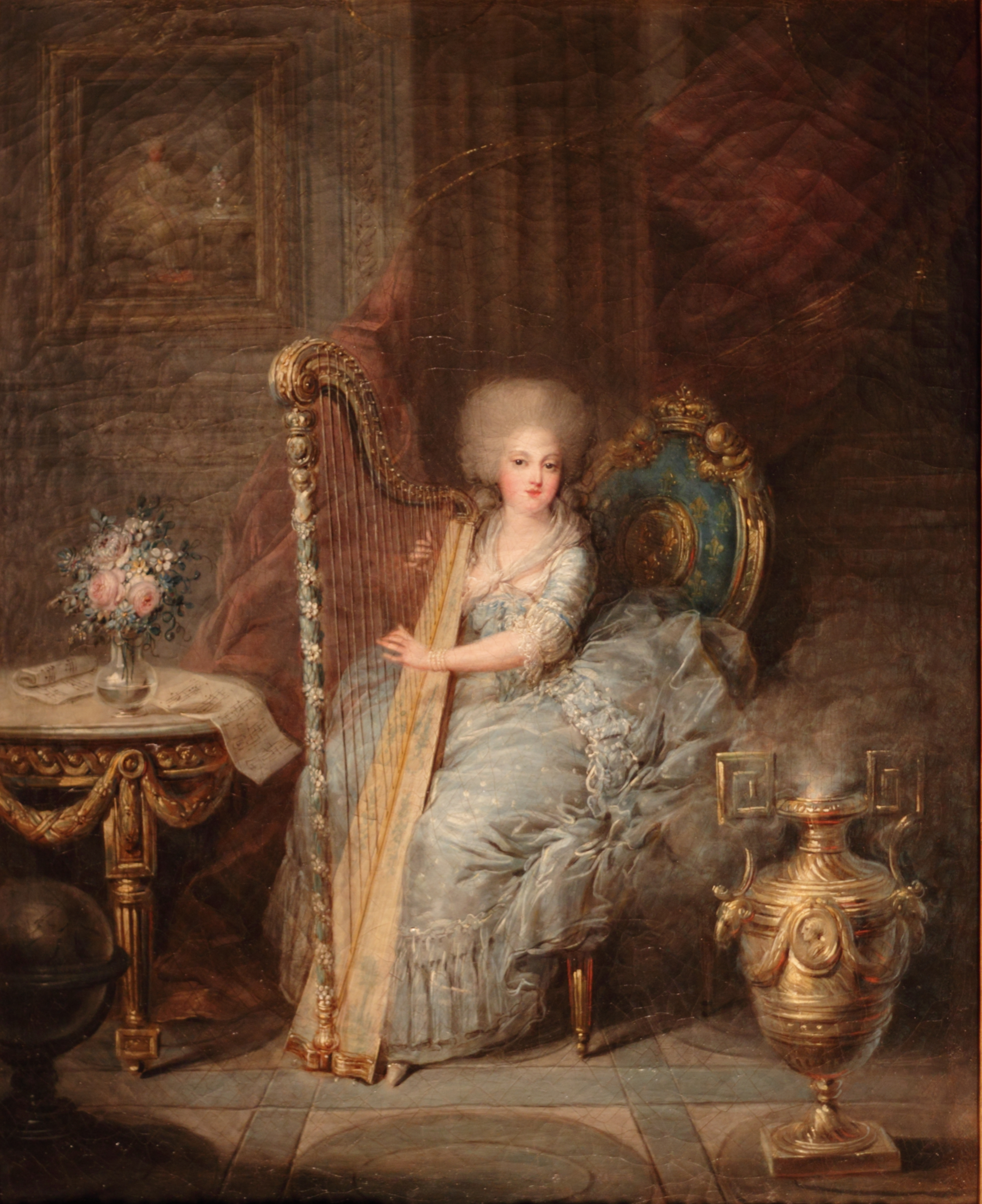
Élisabeth of France, Seated at Her Harp (1783)

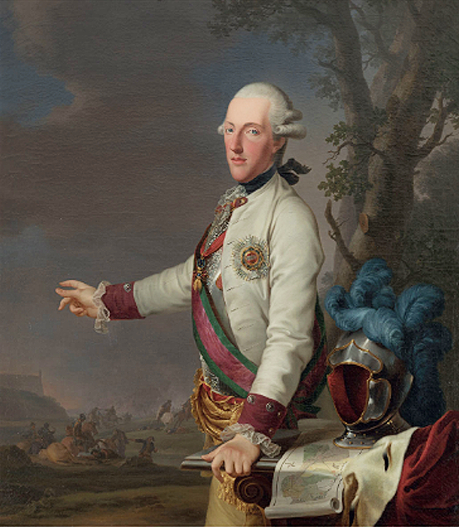
Albert Casimir, Duke of Teschen (c.1790)

Charles Emmanuel Joseph Le Clercq (31 May 1753, Brussels – 30 August 1821, Brussels) was a portrait painter.

== Biography ==
He was the third son of Antoine Joseph Le Clercq (1705–?), a local artist and schoolmaster who was originally from Saint-Venant in Artois, and Catherine Neetens. They also had two daughters. One of his older brothers, Dominique Mathieu (c.1745– ?), became a history painter, but left few traces.

After receiving his first lessons from his father, he was admitted to the Royal Academy of Fine Arts in 1773. Upon winning first prize in a drawing contest, he expressed his desire to finish his training in Rome. While soliciting sources for the necessary funds, he went to Paris for some classes at the Académie royale de peinture et de sculpture.

His expenses were secured at the beginning of 1777, when Prince Charles Alexander of Lorraine provided him with an annual scholarship of 300 Florins. He left for Rome later that year, and was placed under the supervision of Anton von Maron, who was responsible for overseeing all of the painters with Austrian citizenship studying there. The length of his stay is not known for certain, but the year 1781 found him in Turin.

He specialized in genre scenes and portraits in intimate settings; attracting the interest of several princely courts.

From 1783 to 1787, he lived in Paris, and was said to be in the service of Marie-Antoinette, who he painted, as well as several other members of the royal family. In 1787 he returned to Brussels to marry Isabelle Simons; younger sister of the painter known as Marie de Latour. He eventually went back to Paris, where Isabelle died in 1790. Once again he went to Brussels, to marry a certain Marie-Caroline, about whom nothing is known.

In 1792, he produced a series of portraits of Duchess Flore d'Arenberg and her three children, for the House of Arenberg. This resulted in a further series of portraits, featuring Louis Engelbert, 6th Duke of Arenberg, his wife Pauline, who held numerous titles, and their children. These would be his last known works.

He disappeared from public view soon after the abolition of the French monarchy, and apparently fell into destitution. His death came in 1821, at a refuge operated by the Ursulines. For many years, most of his works were misattributed to other artists, such as Joseph Boze, Domenico Duprà, Jean-Baptiste André Gautier-Dagoty, Lié Louis Périn-Salbreux, and Jean-Frédéric Schall.
