= Johan Way =

Swedish professor and painter (1792–1873)

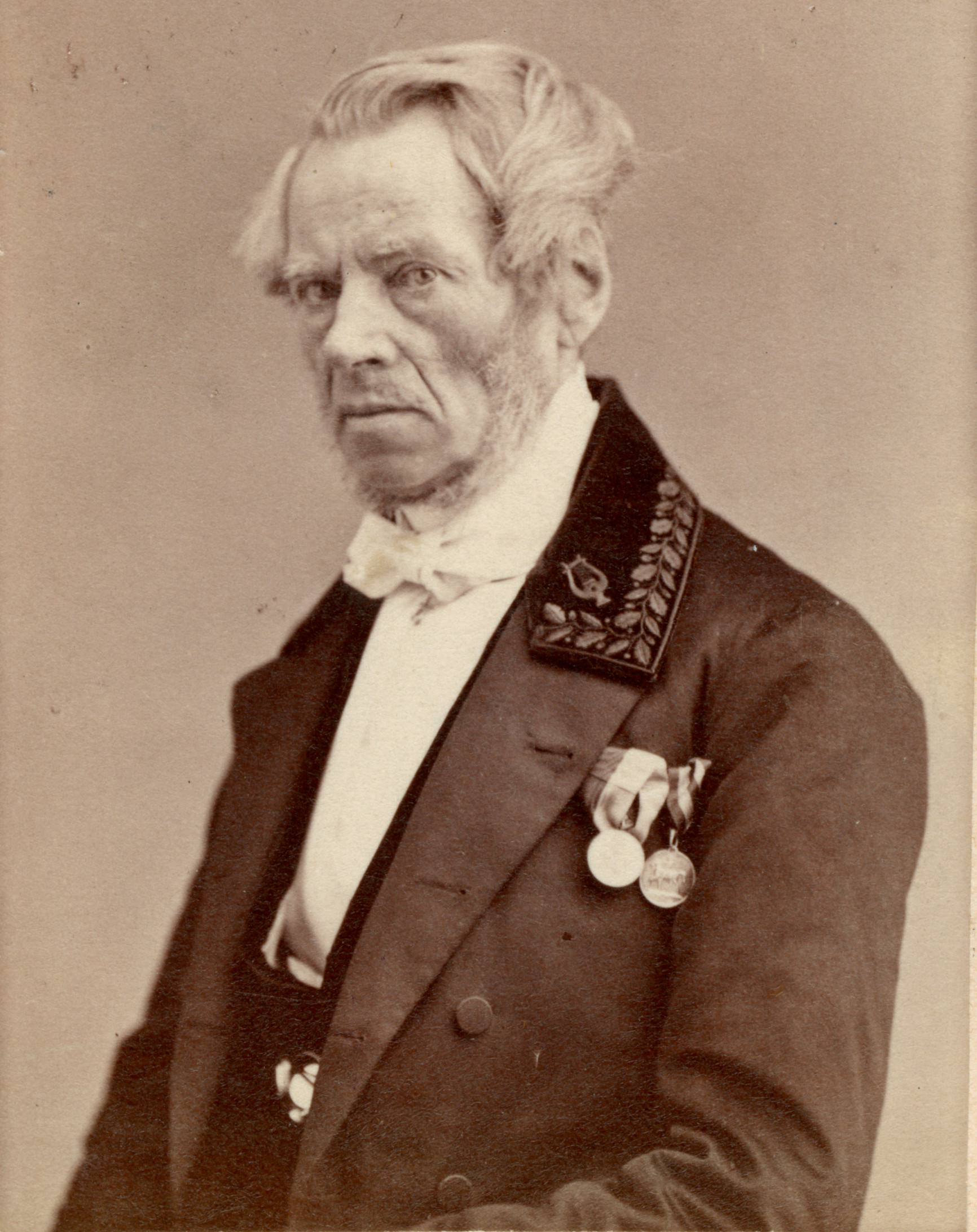
Johan Way (1860s). Photograph by Henri Osti

Johan Wilhelm Carl Way (11 June 1792, Rute, Gotland – 10 April 1873, Stockholm) was a Swedish professor, portrait painter, graphic artist, military officer and writer.

== Biography ==
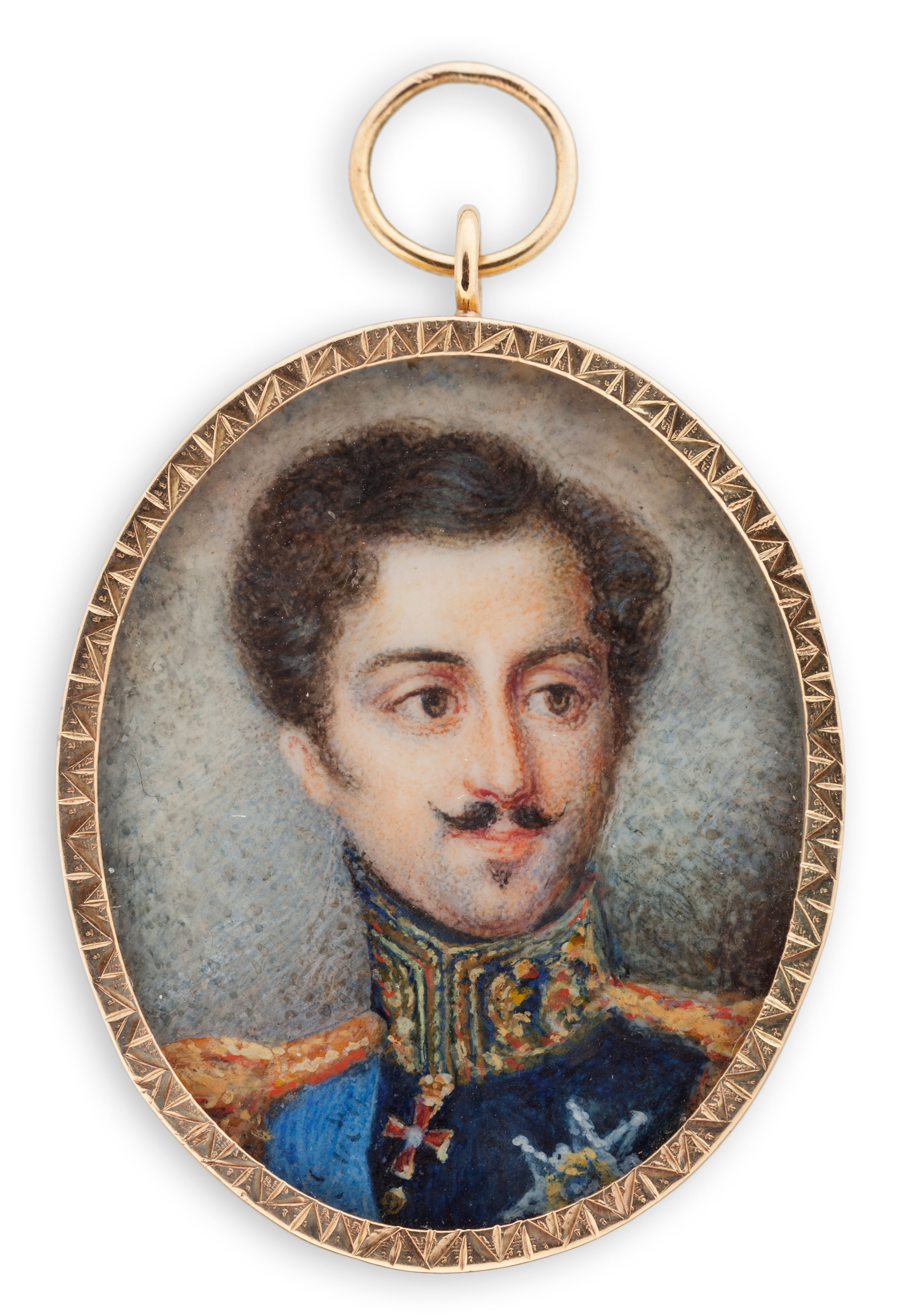
Miniature of King Oscar I

As a young man, he accompanied his father, the shipbuilder Olof Way, on trips to London, and received his first drawing lessons there in 1807. Initially, he pursued a military career, as a second-lieutenant in the Wendes Artillery Regiment. He later wrote a book about his experiences on a campaign to Germany in 1813, where he served as an adjutant to Commander Carl von Cardell. He resigned in 1819, with the rank of Lieutenant.

After that, he studied abroad; notably in Brussels with Marie de Latour and her son, Alexandre de Latour, who taught him how to paint miniatures. In 1826, he studied glass painting in Paris, and may have learned engraving from Fredrik Boije. The following year, he married the artist Marie Therese Hästesko (1807-1866), from a noble family. Shortly after, he established a colored glass factory in Uppsala, at his own expense. In the 1830s, he initiated the art museum at Uppsala University, where he served as a drawing master from 1831 to 1872. He became the museum's prefect in 1858.

During the 1840s, he oversaw the reconstruction of the Gustavianum, the university's oldest building, and helped design the new Uppsala Observatory (opened in 1853). From 1842 to 1848, he also taught at the Royal Swedish Academy of Arts and, in 1843, succeeded Jacob Axel Gillberg as the professor of miniature painting. He was appointed the official court painter for miniatures in 1846. He eventually created over 100 of them.

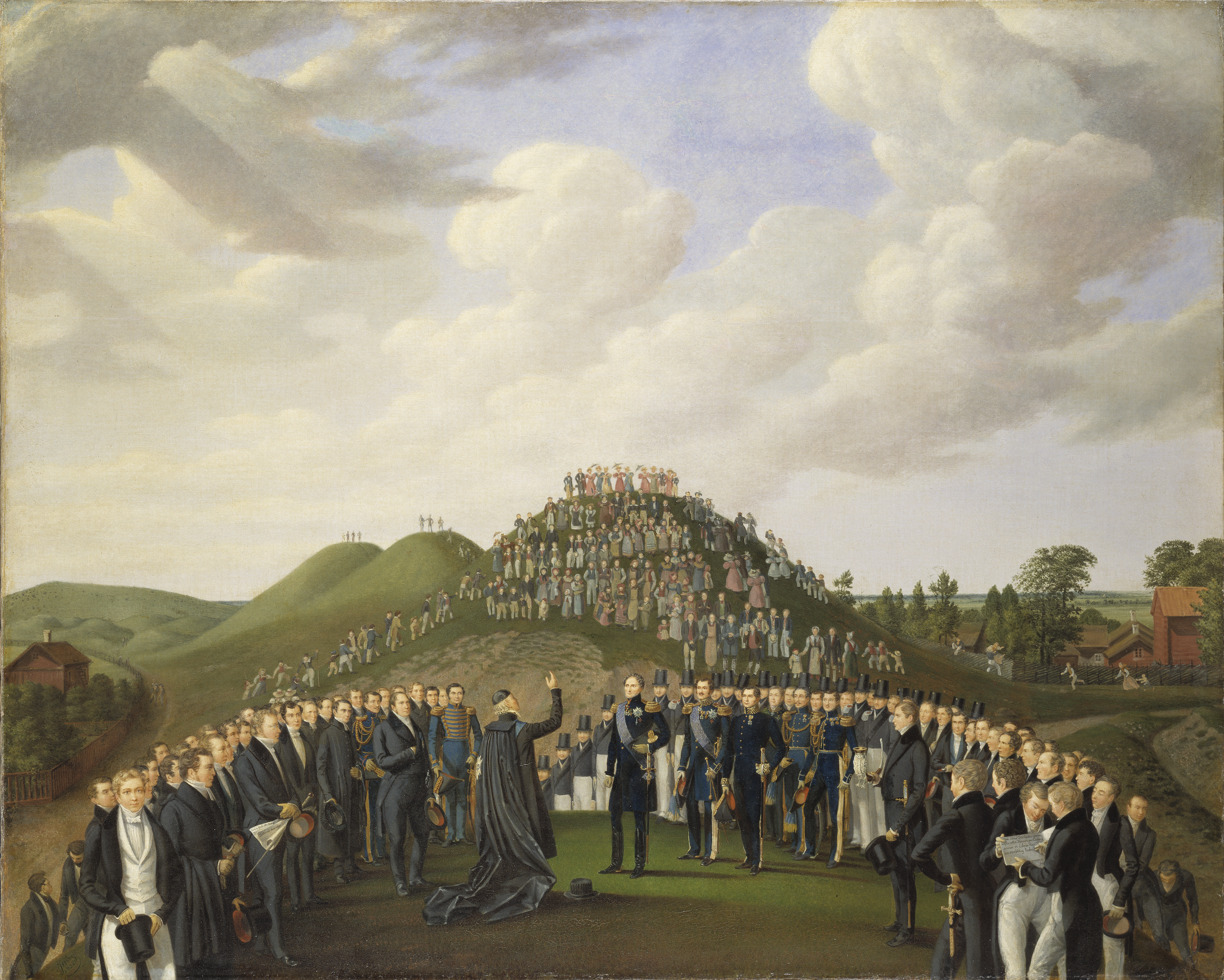
King Carl XIV Johan Visiting the Royal Mounds at Gamla Uppsala (1836)

His best-known works include the stained glass windows in the Gustavian style burial vault at Uppsala Cathedral; created from 1831 to 1841. Before beginning work on the windows, he made study trips to England, France and Munich, Germany to perfect his craft. The Royal Academy reimbursed him for some of his travels after he became a teacher there; having previously refused to provide any funds.

From the 820s through 1860, he participated in ten of the academy's exhibitions. His last major showing was in 1872, at the Nordic Industrial and Art Exhibition in Copenhagen. Many of his works were made into lithographs. He is represented in the collections of most of the major museums in Sweden, as well as the Musée Bernadotte in Pau, France.
