= Autissier =

Autissier is a French surname. Notable people with the surname include:

- Isabelle Autissier (born 1956), French sailor, navigator, writer, and broadcaster
- Louis-Marie Autissier (1772–1830), French-born Belgian portrait miniature painter
