= Otto Eerelman =

Dutch painter

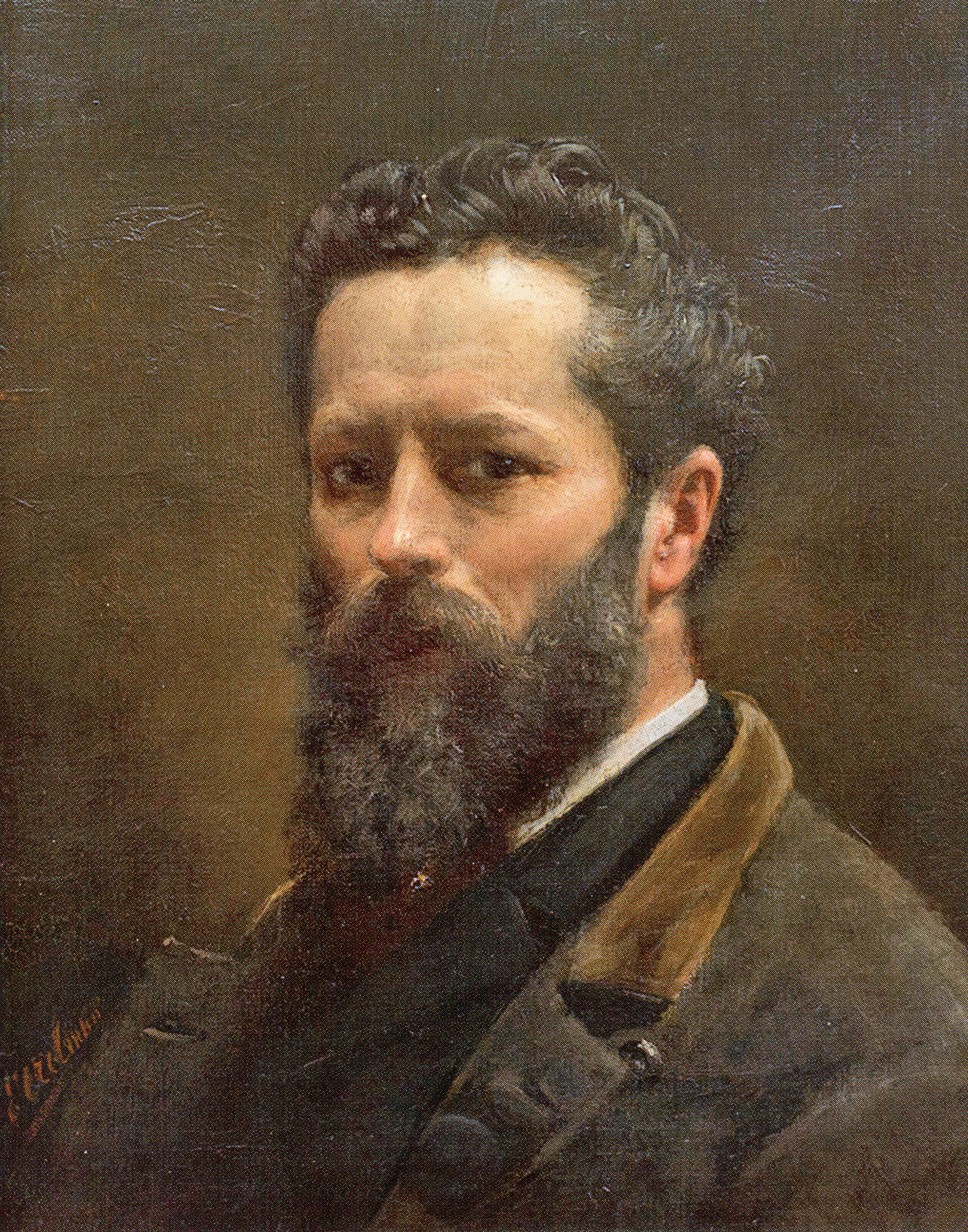
Self-portrait (1889)

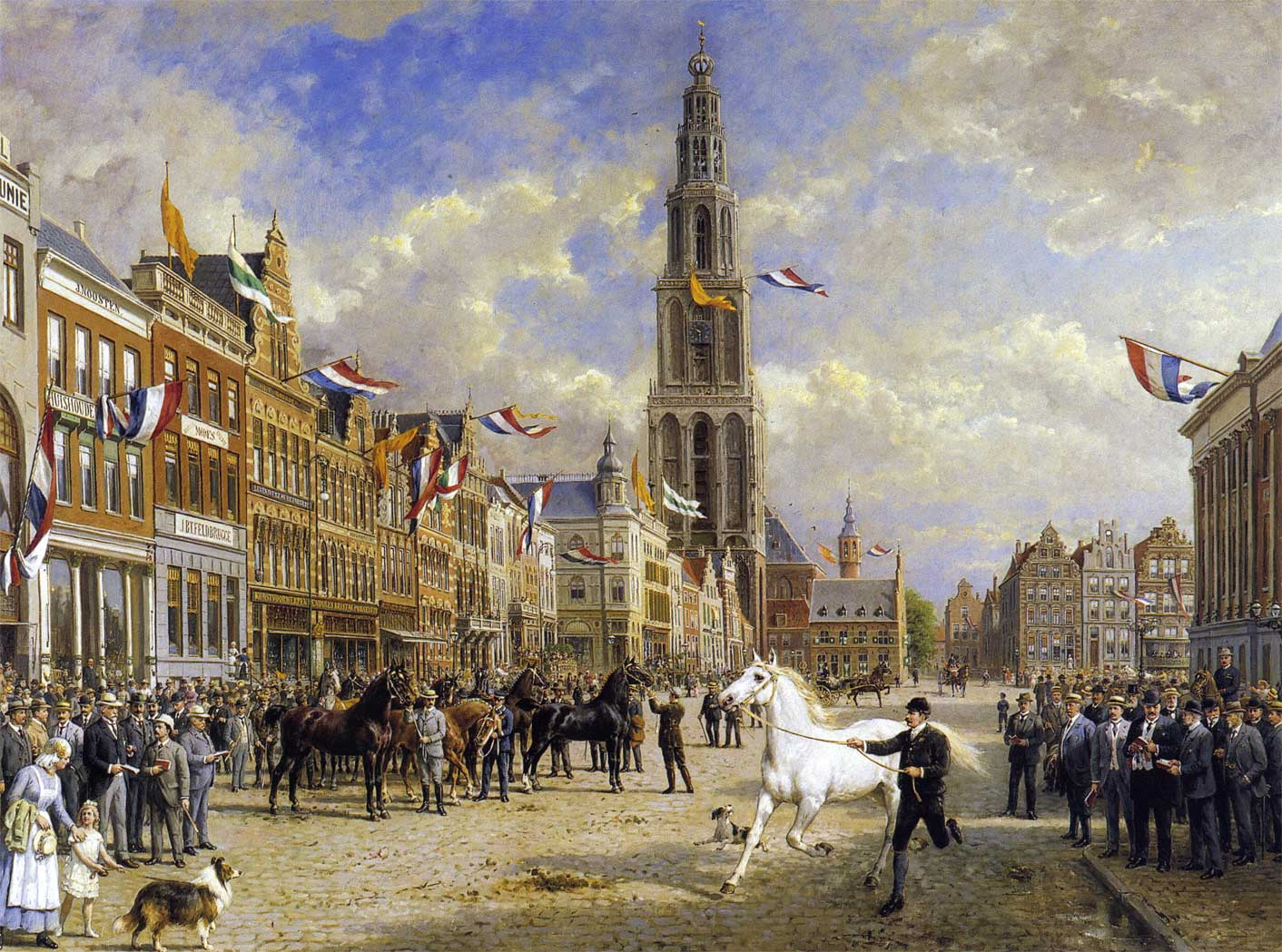
The "Paardenkeuring" (horse inspection) in Groningen (1920)

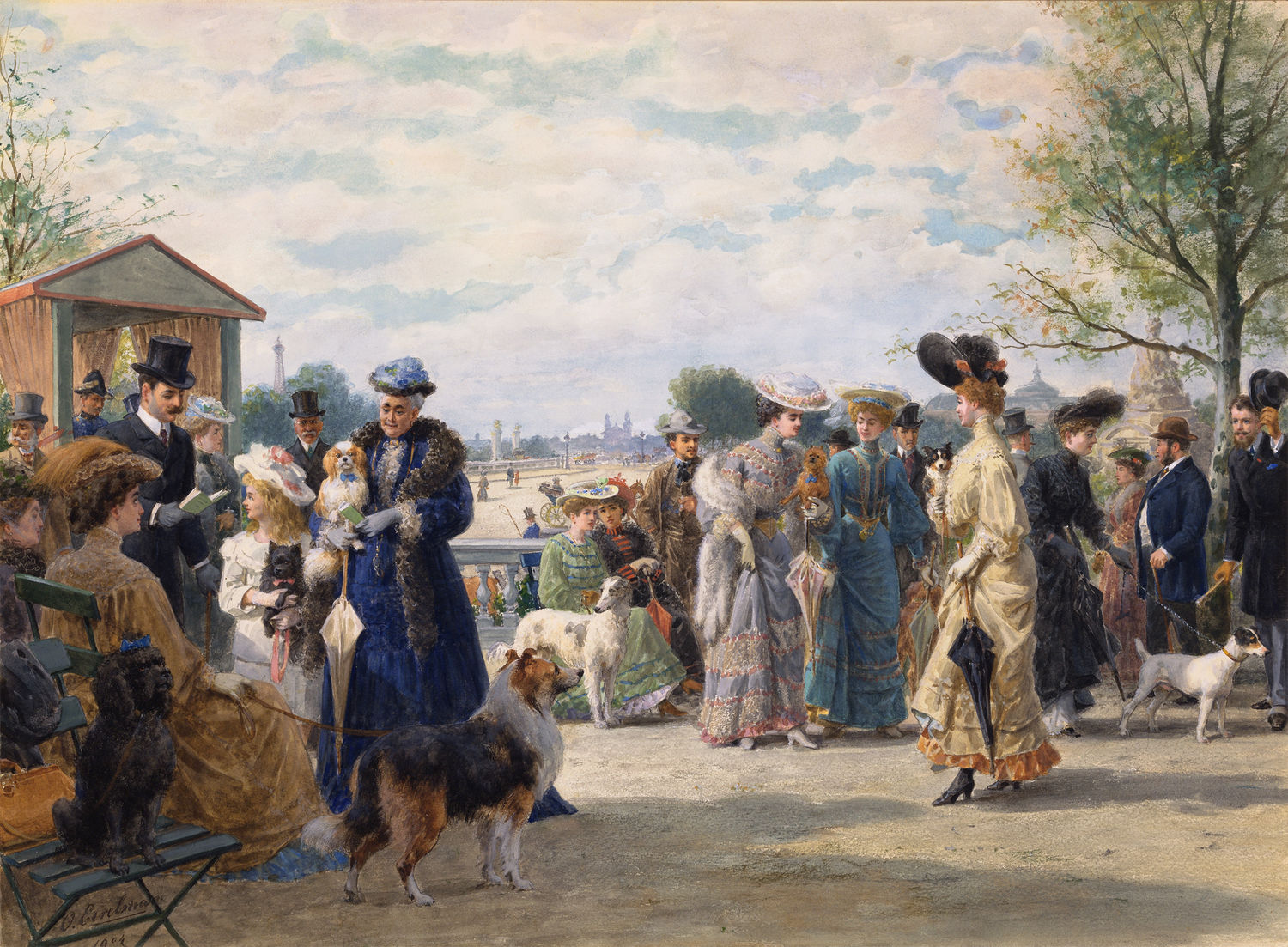
Otto Eerelman, Concours de Chiens au Promenade, 1904. Watercolor on paper.

Otto Eerelman (23 March 1839, Groningen - 3 October 1926, Groningen) was a Dutch painter; best known for his depictions of dogs and horses. He was also a court painter and did several portraits of Wilhelmina, as Princess and Queen.

== Biography ==
His father was sexton at Der Aa-kerk. He showed an early aptitude for art and, against the wishes of his parents, enrolled at the Academie Minerva in 1860, where he studied with J.H. Egenberger. After graduating, he spent another year at the Royal Academy of Fine Arts (Antwerp). Later, he took private lessons in the studios of Lawrence Alma-Tadema.

After a brief stay in Paris, he returned to Groningen and worked as a teacher at the Academie from 1867 to 1874. He moved to Brussels that year to establish himself as a painter but, for unknown reasons, relocated to The Hague in 1875, where he lived until 1902. It was during this time that he served as a court painter and many of his works are still to be seen in Het Loo.

In 1898, an illustrated album called Horse Races was published, containing 40 lithographs of Eerelman's paintings by Richard Schoenbeck (1840-1919). It featured Queen Wilhelmina's favorite horse, "Woyko", and proved to be very popular. Later, an annotated collection of his works was translated into English by Clara Bell under the title Horses and Dogs. His best known painting, "De paardenkeuring op de Grote Markt op de 28ste augustus", depicts an annual celebration (featuring horses) held to commemorate the lifting of the Siege of Groningen.

For health reasons ("rheumatic neuralgia"), he spent five years in Arnhem, then went back to Groningen in 1907. At the age of eighty, he was made a Ridder and a street in Groningen was named after him. It was said that one could tell when visitors to the Louvre were from Groningen because they would ask "where are the Eerelmans?". He was, however, mostly forgotten by the second half of the 20th century. It is only recently that interest in his works has been revived. From April to August, 2015, a major retrospective was held at the Museum Nienoord in Leek.
