= Louis-Marie Autissier =

French painter

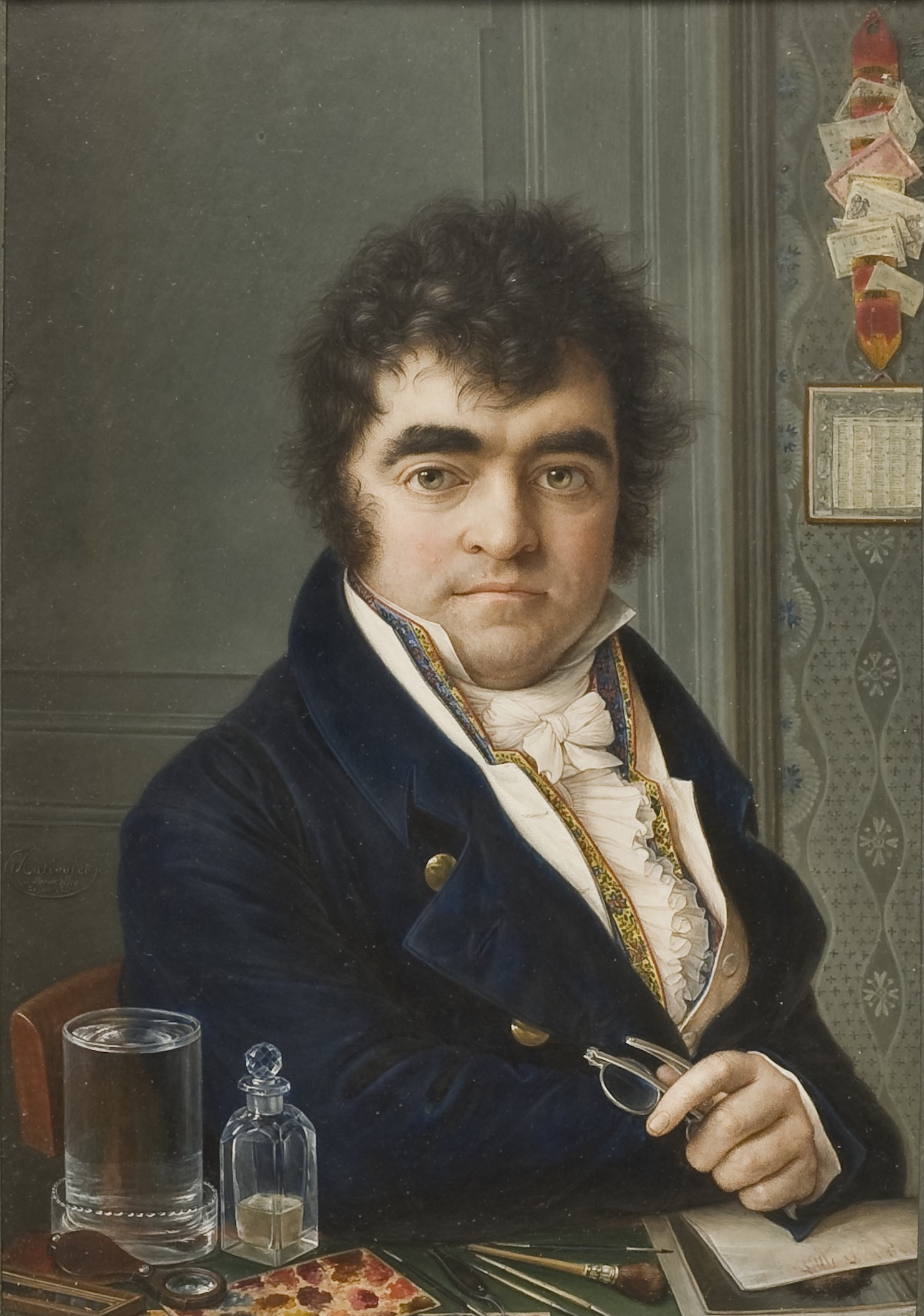
Self-portrait (watercolour on ivory, 1817), Nationalmuseum, Stockholm

Louis-Marie Autissier (8 February 1772 – 21 September 1830) was a French-born portrait miniature painter in the Netherlands. According to Marjorie E. Wieseman, curator of European painting at the Cincinnati Art Museum, "Autissier's success as a miniaturist was in large measure due to his talent as a colourist and his meticulous detailing of costumes and accessory." He is considered the founder of the Belgian school of miniature painting in the nineteenth century. Among his most accomplished pupils and followers were Alexandre de Latour ^{a} (1780–1858), Louis Henri de Fontenay (1800–after 1852), and Dominique Ducaju (1802–1867).^{b} His works are in the collections of the Cincinnati Art Museum, the Nationalmuseum and the Royal Collection.

== Biography ==
Born in Vannes, in Brittany, Autissier studied art under Vautrin at the École nationale supérieure des Beaux-Arts. He joined the French Revolutionary army at Rennes in 1791. Serving as secretary to the local commander, his skill as a draftsman was quickly recognised. On leaving the army in 1795, Autissier went to Paris and furthered his training by studying paintings at the Louvre. In 1796, he settled in Brussels, there he devoted himself to miniature painting, and became famous for his portraits.

The following years of his life were divided between Belgium, the Netherlands, and France. He exhibited works regularly at Salons in Brussels, Ghent, Antwerp, Amsterdam, and Paris; and was much employed in painting miniature portraits of the sovereigns, nobility, and celebrities of Belgium and the Netherlands. In 1806, after the Revolution and the forming of the First French Empire, he was named court painter to Louis Bonaparte, French King of the Netherlands from 1806 to 1810; and in 1815, court painter to William I of the Netherlands.

At the same time, the artist assumed the first names of his father; from 1801 to 1820 he exhibited under the name Jean François. Returning to Brussels in 1809, Autisier painted a portrait of the Duke of Wellington in 1817 and later, in Paris, King Louis XVIII and members of the royal family. Apart from portraits, Autissier occasionally executed historical scenes in miniature – a rare subject matter in this genre.

Autissier exhibited two sorts of miniatures at the annual Salons: portraits of his most prestigious clients and, from 1811, "fancy pictures", or idealized genre subjects, generally made for sale on the open market rather than on commission. These attractive studies of young women are described in the Salon catalogues as "portraits idéal", "études de fantaisie", or "figures de fantaisie", and generally priced between 400 and 600 French francs, a considerable sum for the period. Many of the models in these miniatures wear the regional costume of Belgium and the Netherlands; others are more exotically clad in Circassian, Portuguese, or English dress. Altogether his paintings include more than 250 miniatures. Autissier died penniless in Brussels on 4 September 1830.

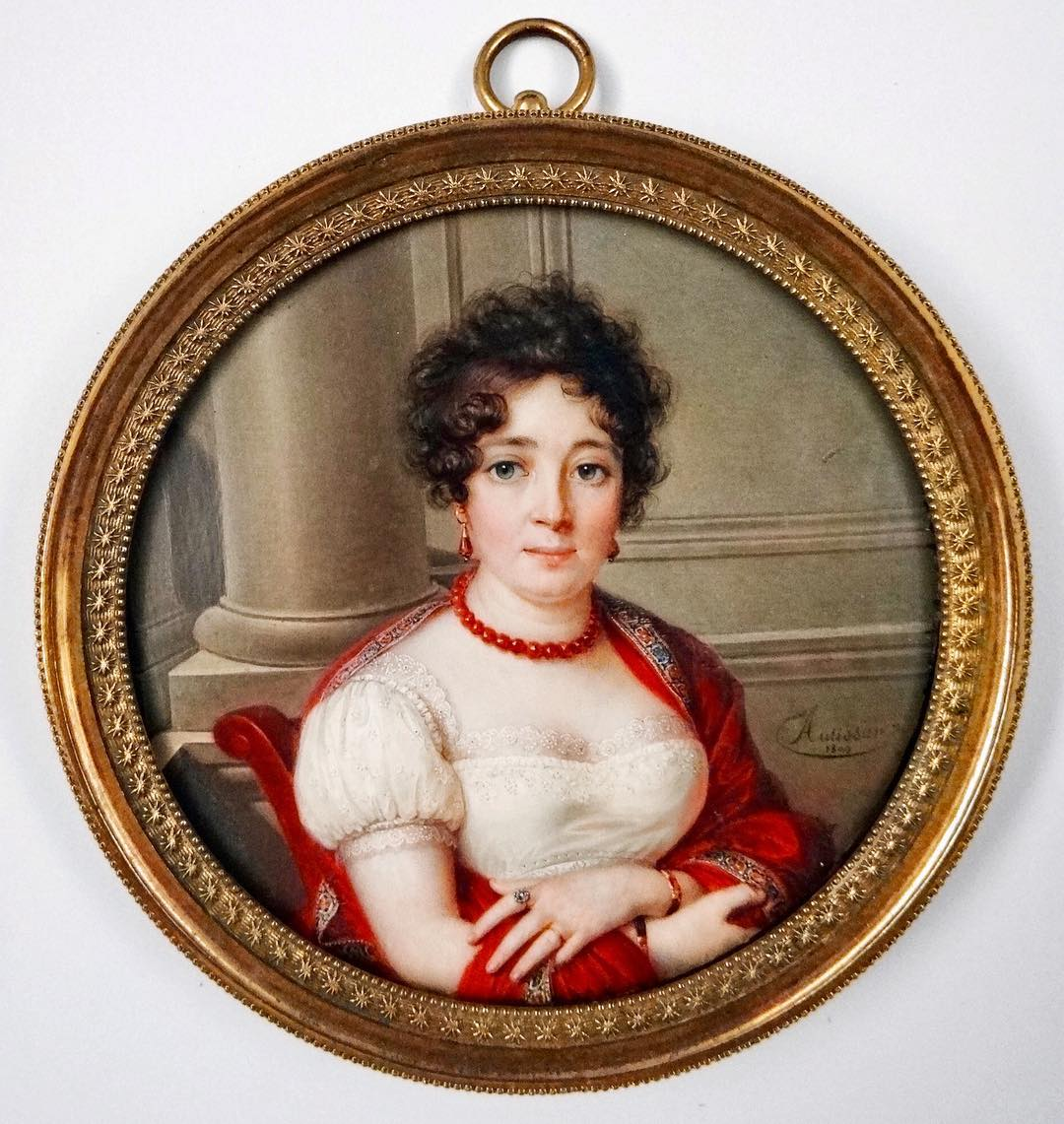
The Dutch actress Johanna Wattier

== Notes ==
^a Some sources give his name as "Alexandre Delatour".
^b Some sources give his name as "Dominicus du Caju". Very little is known about him.

== Bibliography ==
Attribution:

- This article incorporates text from a publication now in the public domain: Bryan, Michael (1886). "Autissier, Louis Marie". In Graves, Robert Edmund (ed.). Bryan's Dictionary of Painters and Engravers (A–K). Vol. I (3rd ed.). London: George Bell & Sons.
- Aronson, Julie; Wieseman, Marjorie E. (2006). Perfect likeness: European and American Portrait Miniatures from the Cincinnati Art Museum. Yale University Press. ISBN 0-300-11580-6.
- State, Paul F. (2004). Historical Dictionary of Brussels (14 ed.). Scarecrow Press. ISBN 0-8108-5075-3.
- Lucien Lemaire, Autissier, miniaturiste, 1772-1830 (Lille, 1912) exhibition catalogue Brussels, Kreditbank.
- Autissier et le portraitc miniature romantique en Belgique, exhibition catalogue by Bodo Hofstetter and Philippe Plantade, 1998. Brussels, Kreditbank.
