= Marie de Latour =

Belgian artist (1750–1834)

- Portrait of Marie Simons, painted by her son Alexandre de Latour (Royal Museum of Fine Arts Antwerp)
- Born: Marie Élisabeth Jeanne de Latour-Simons ca. 1750; Belgium
- Died: ca. 1834; Brussels, Belgium
- Education: Royal Academy of Fine Arts of Antwerp,
- Occupation: Painter
- Spouse: Philippe-François de Latour
- Parent: Jan Baptist Simons (father)
- Relatives: Alexandre (son)

Marie Élisabeth Jeanne de Latour-Simons, known as Marie de Latour (1750, Brussels - 1834, Brussels) was a Belgian painter and engraver.

== Biography ==
She came from a family of artists. Her father, Jan Baptist Simons (1717-1783), was a well-known Flemish artist. She was a sister-in-law of the portrait painter Charles Le Clercq. Her brother, Jean-Baptiste Simons, also became a painter. Around 1780, she married Philippe-François de Latour (1747-1822), about whom little is known.

She spent most of 1774 as a student at the Royal Academy of Fine Arts in Antwerp, and produced works in a variety of media; including pastels, gouaches, portrait miniatures and prints. Many were interior scenes. She gave some of her pastels to her brother when he went blind in 1786.

Eventually she specialized in engraving; inspired by the works of Nicolaes Berchem, Peter Paul Rubens and the Van de Velde family. In 1817, she received an award from the "Antwerp Society for the Encouragement of Fine Arts". She also worked in Paris and Berlin, where she was presented with an appointment as court painter by King Frederick William III. In 1822, she exhibited three oil paintings at the Salon de Lille, a division of the Musée d'Orsay.

Her son, Alexandre, also became a painter; specializing in portrait miniatures. She took students as well; one of the most notable being the Swedish artist, Johan Way.

The Royal Museum of Fine Arts Antwerp and the Brussels City Museum have preserved some of her works.

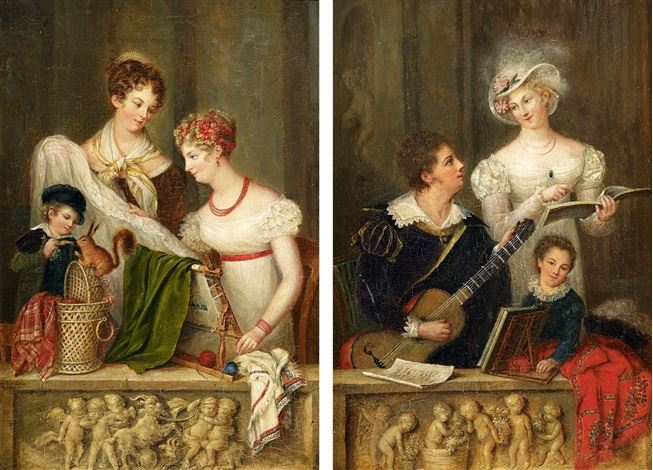
Allegories of touch and hearing

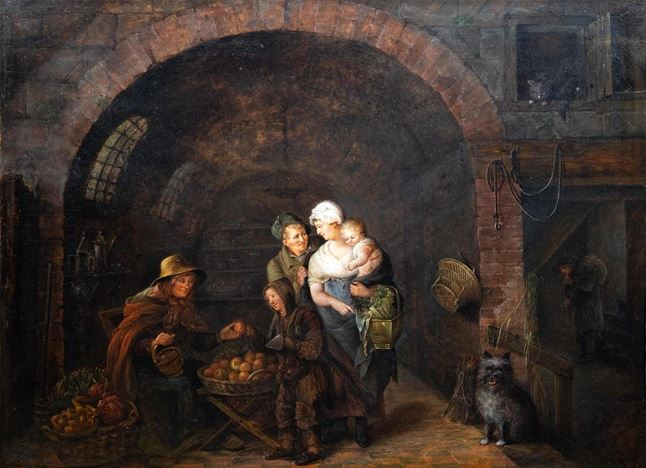
A Family Buying Apples (1815)
