= Barend Wijnveld =

Dutch painter

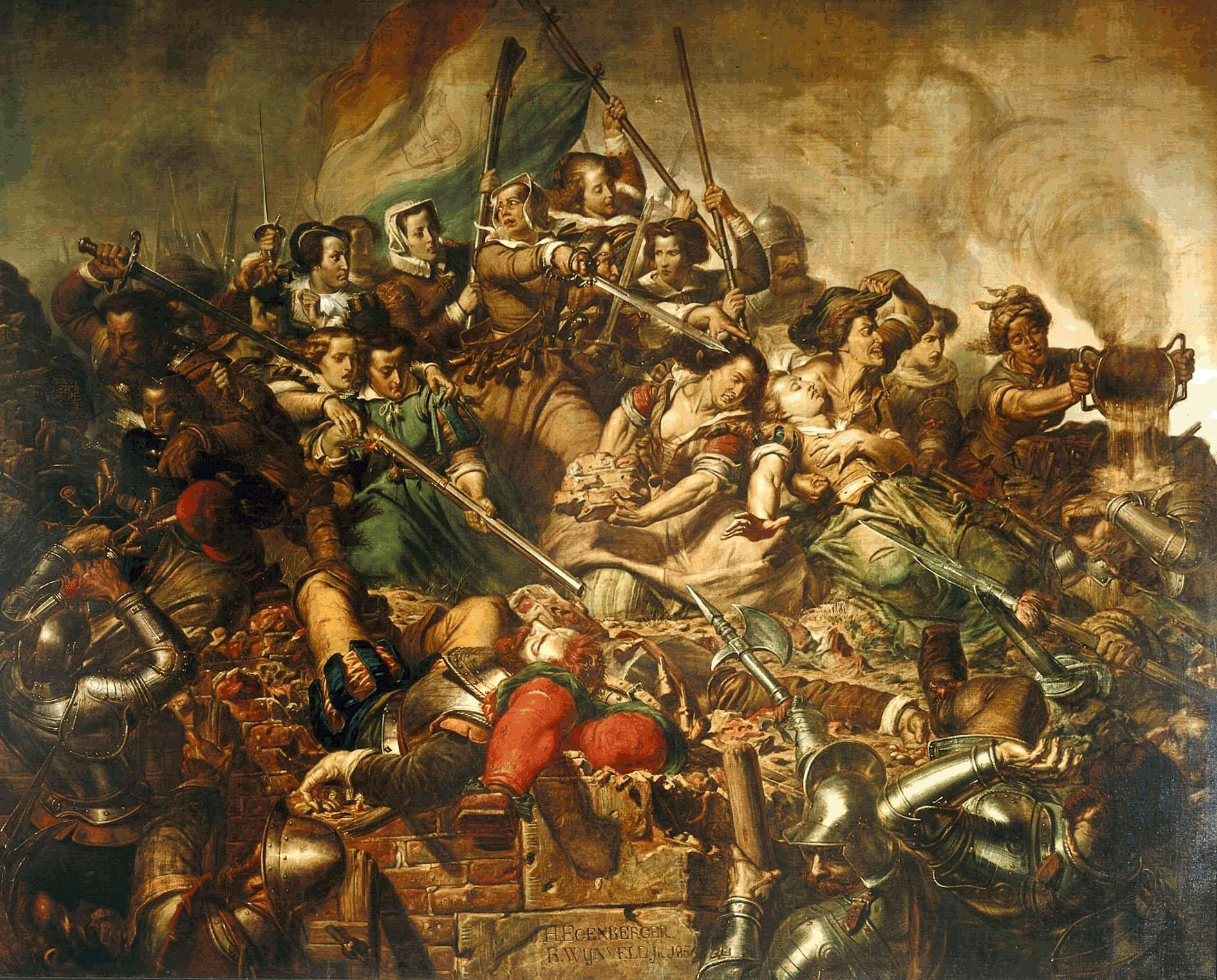
Kenau Simonsdochter Hasselaer defending Haarlem from the Spanish invaders (painted together with J.H. Egenberger)

Barend Wijnveld (13 August 1820 – 18 February 1902) was a Dutch painter.

== Biography ==
He was born in Amsterdam and was a member of Arti et Amicitiae from 1854. From 1869 he was professor of the Rijksakademie van Beeldende Kunsten where he had many pupils. He was also artist-in-residence at Natura Artis Magistra.

He died in Haarlem.
