= Jacob Axel Gillberg =

Swedish portrait miniaturist (1769–1845)

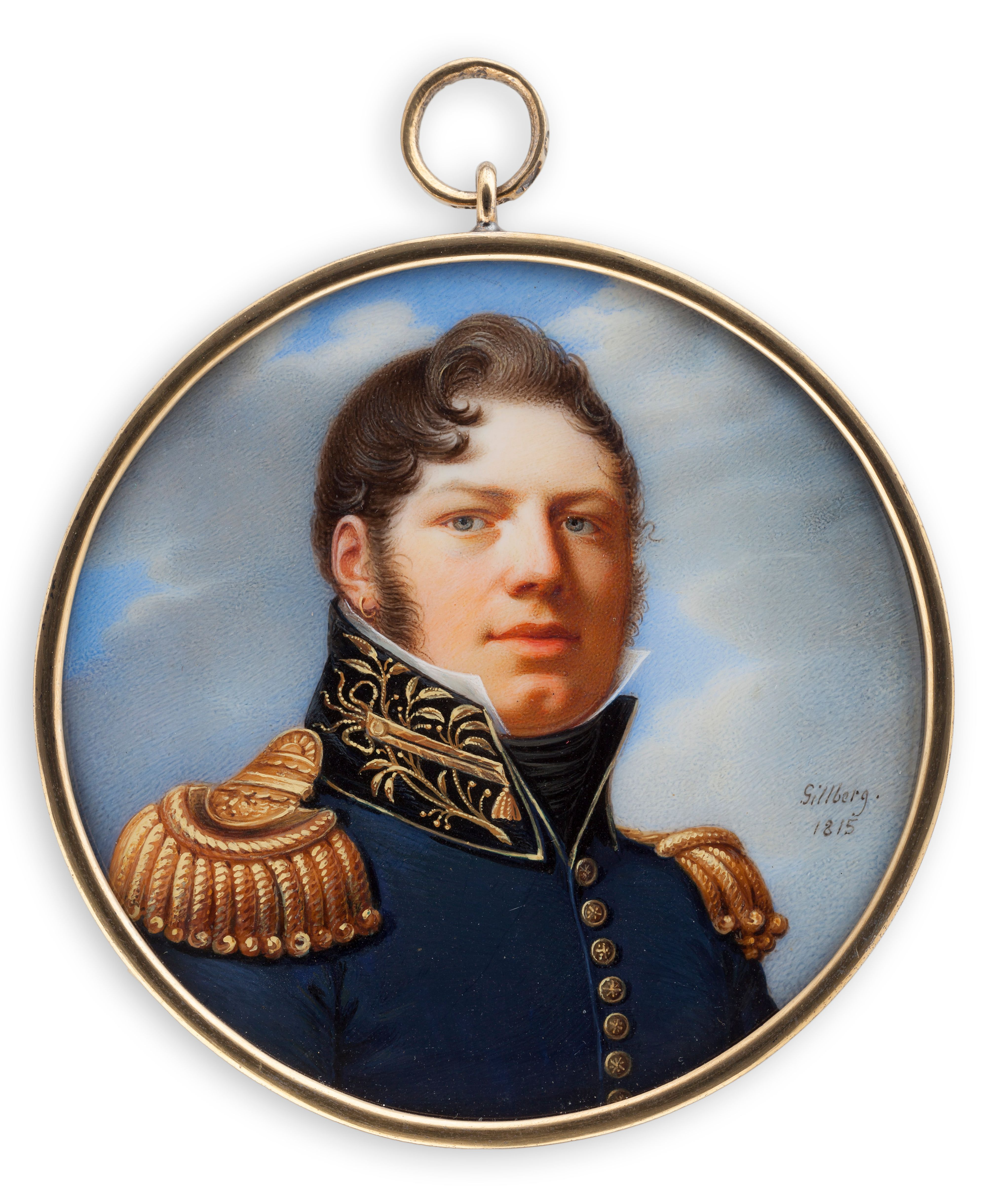
Self-portrait (1815)

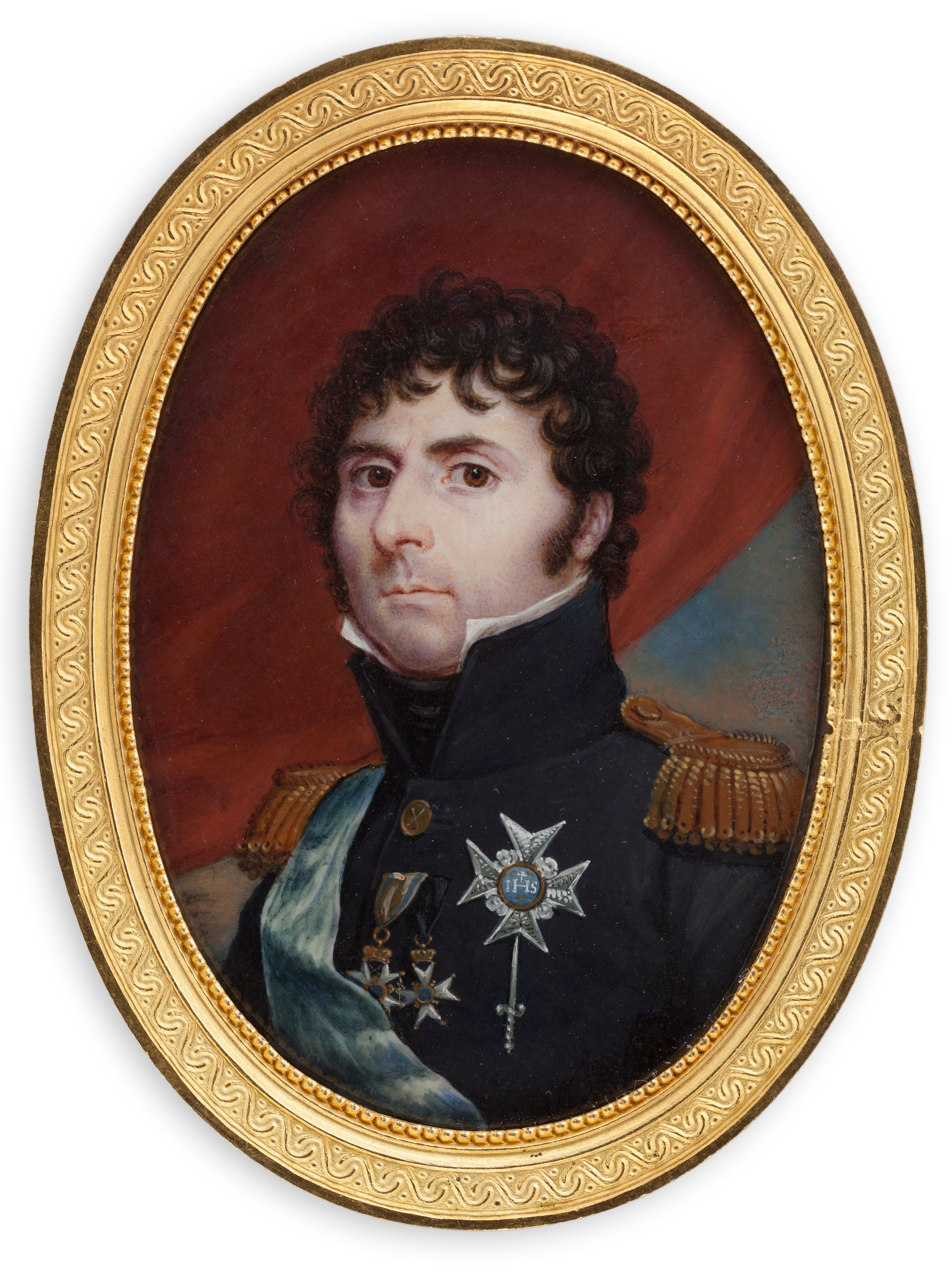
King Karl XIV Johan (c. 1810)

Jacob Axel Gillberg (15 December 1769, Badelunda Parish, Västmanland – 1 October 1845, Stockholm) was a Swedish portrait miniaturist and military officer.

== Biography ==
His father, Jacob Gillberg, was a copper engraver, who was serving as an Army draftsman at the time of his birth. At the age of ten, he was working with the fortification corps. Two years later, he was already a student at the Royal Institute of Art and won several prizes. He received some guidance from the Danish miniaturist, Cornelius Høyer, during a visit there, and exhibited his first miniatures shortly after, in 1785.

By 1790, he had gone abroad; spending several years in Holland, France, England and Belgium, where he studied with the miniaturist, Marie de Latour. Part of this was funded by a state scholarship. He enlisted in the Army as a captain in 1792. The following year, he became a military draftsman like his father.

Until 1810, he served as an instructor at the Military Academy Karlberg, becoming a professor there in 1798. He was promoted to major in 1803. After 1812, he was involved with the conscription process. During this time, he was able to exhibit occasionally at the Royal Academy and was much sought after for his portraits. He also spent some time as a court painter for King Karl XIV Johan.

From 1840 until his death, he was the director of the Royal Academy. His works may be seen at the Nationalmuseum and the Göteborgs konstmuseum.
