= Franciscus Hermanus Bach =

Dutch painter

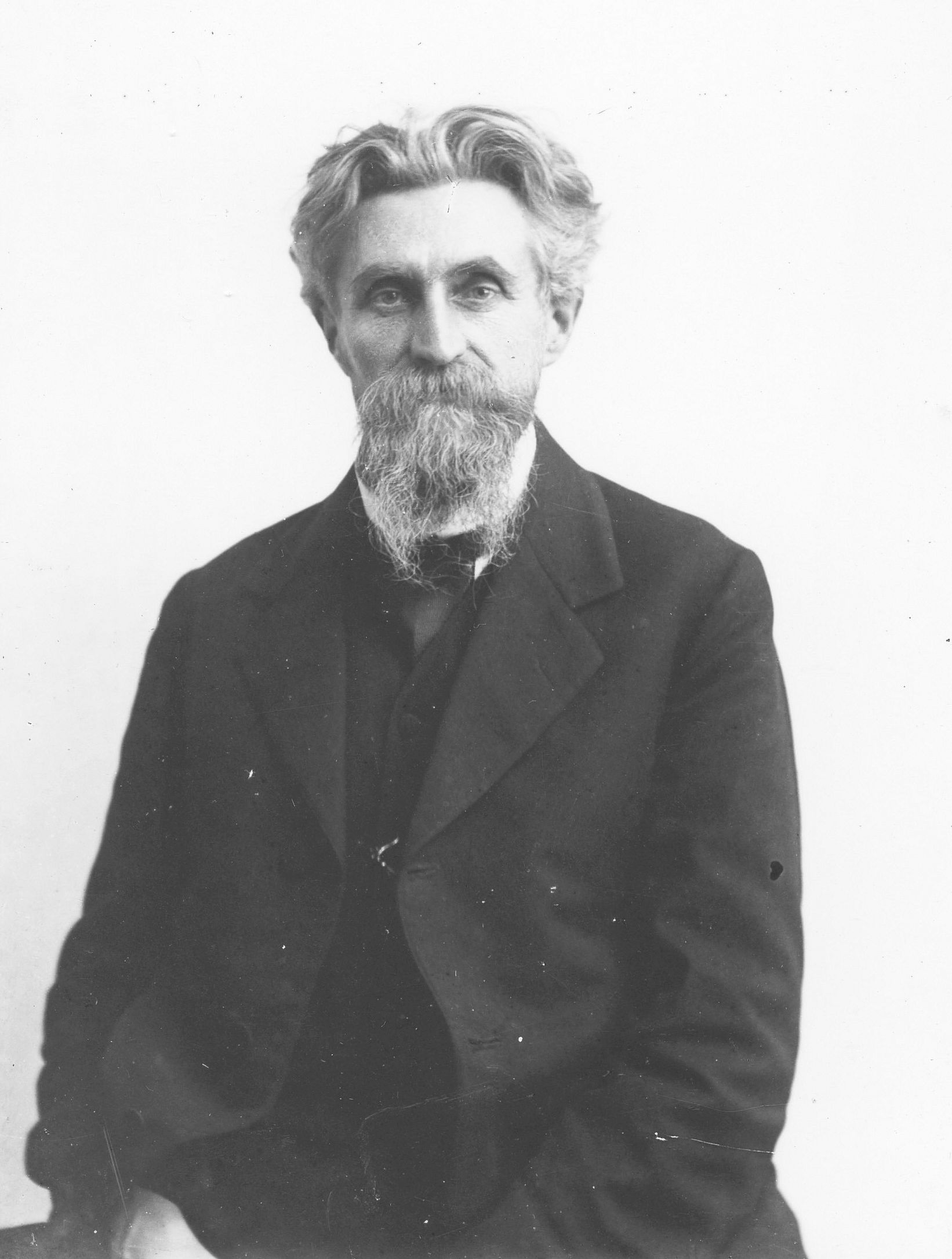

Franciscus Hermanus Bach, officially Bachg, (May 28, 1865 – January 22, 1956) was a Dutch painter.

Bach was born in the city of Groningen in the Netherlands as the son of the smith Johann Caspar Bachg, who had migrated to the Netherlands from Haselünne in Germany. The official spelling of his surname was Bachg, but it is reported that Bach himself only realised this later on in his life. He usually signed his work as "F.H. Bach" or "F.H.B.".

== From pupil to teacher ==
At the age of 11, Bach took evening classes at the Academie Minerva, an art academy located in Groningen, which was founded 1798. Two years later he received a bronze medal for drawing. In 1882 he was made a drawing teacher at the Henri Daniel Guyot Instituut, the first Dutch school for the deaf, in Groningen, although he had not yet completed his studies. In 1884, he passed his drawing exam and was awarded the Grote Koninklijke Medaille (the Great Royal Medal) for anatomy and the Zilveren Academie Medaille (the Silver Academy Medal) for ornamental design. Johannes Hinderikus Egenberger, the directeur of the Academie Minerva, persuaded the board of the Academie to accept Bach as a master at the age of 19, which he remained for 43 years Bach was regarded as one of the most stimulating teachers at the Academie Minerva, where some of his pupils were Jan Altink, Albert Hahn, Cornelis Jetses and Jacob Por.

In 1918 a number of his old pupils grounded the artist collective De Ploeg. He had a significant influence on the artistic development of important members of De Ploeg. Bach was a member of Arti et Amicitiae and, for some years, of De Ploeg.

== His work as a painter ==
In his work as a landscape and portrait painter, Bach can be considered an impressionist of the Hague School. He painted nineteen portraits of professors for the senaatskamer (board room) in the Academiegebouw (main building) of the University of Groningen.

Bach also made numerous Stations of the Cross and murals for Roman Catholic churches in the North, East and South of the Netherlands, such as the Sint-Martinuskerk (Foxham), the Paterskerk (Groningen) and the Juvenaatskapel in Maastricht. Bach also painted a number of ceramic tableaux, which were erected in the hall of the main railway station in Groningen in 1896.

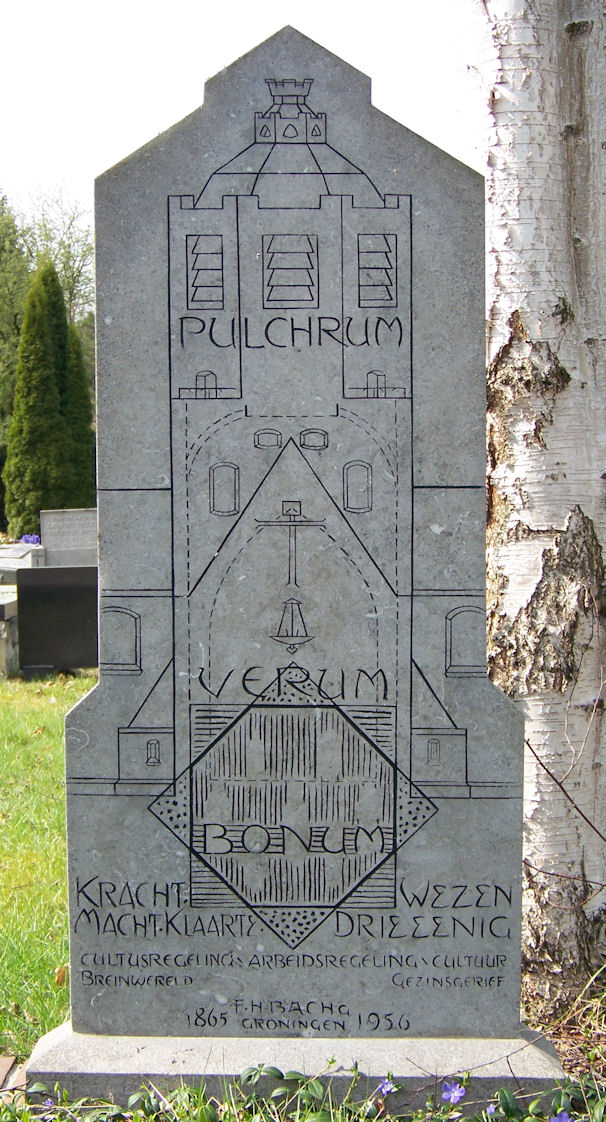
Tombstone of Franciscus Hermanus Bach

Bach died at the age of ninety and was buried in the Roman Catholic cemetery in Groningen under a tombstone of his own design. The artist Johan Dijkstra wrote of this: "Being the eccentric that he was, he had his own tombstone made while still alive: on this stone he built his spiritual legacy: the formula that he had devised for a new form of the catholic church."

== Gallery ==
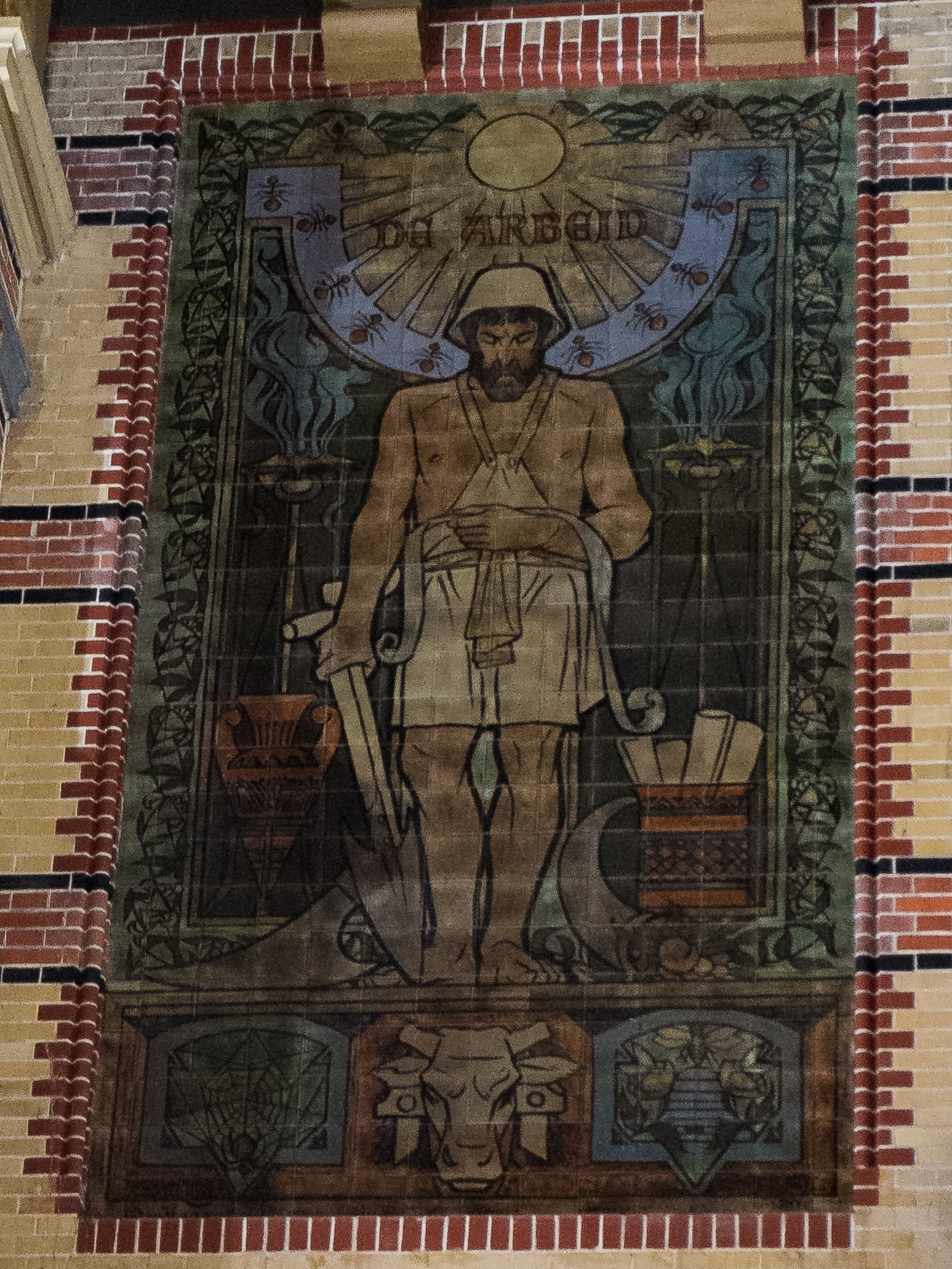

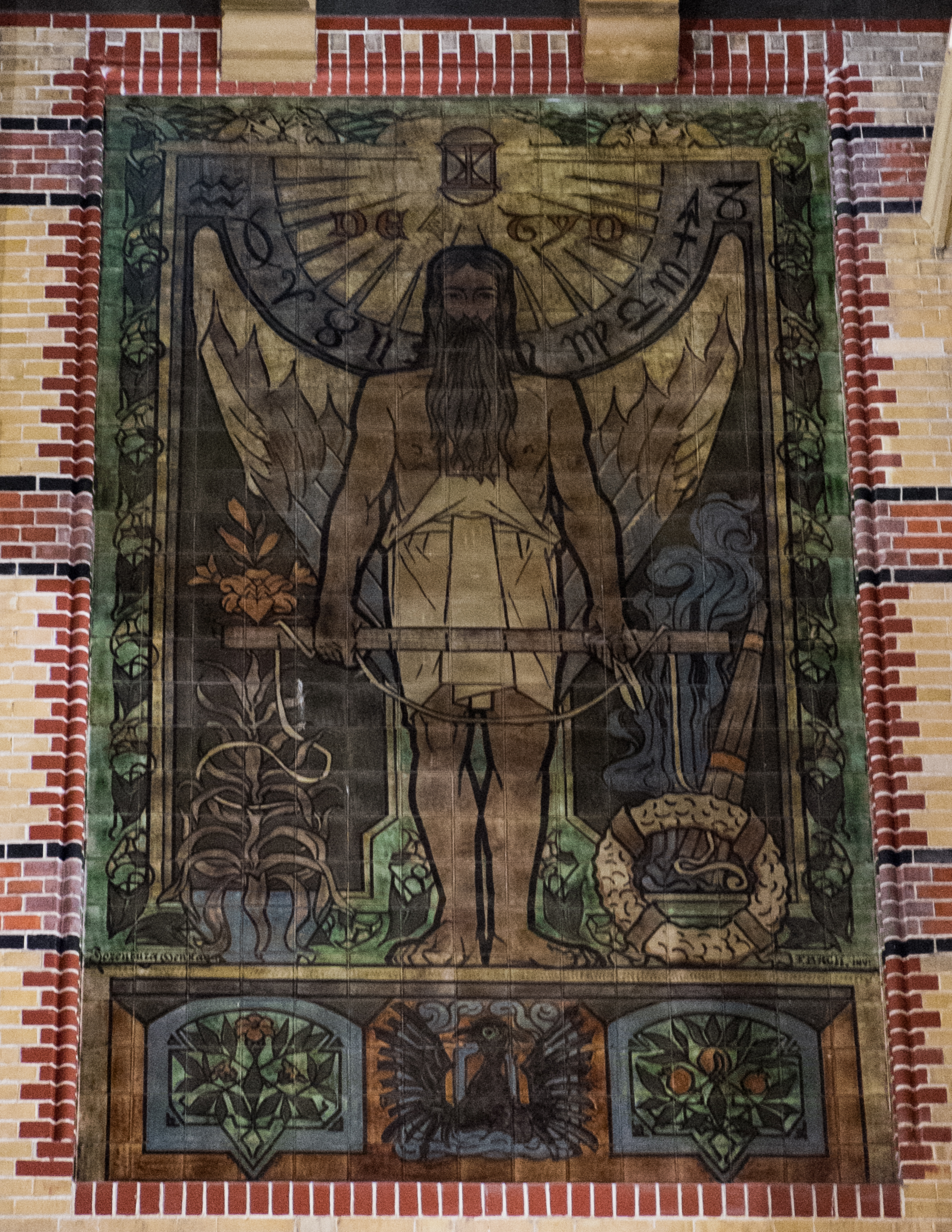

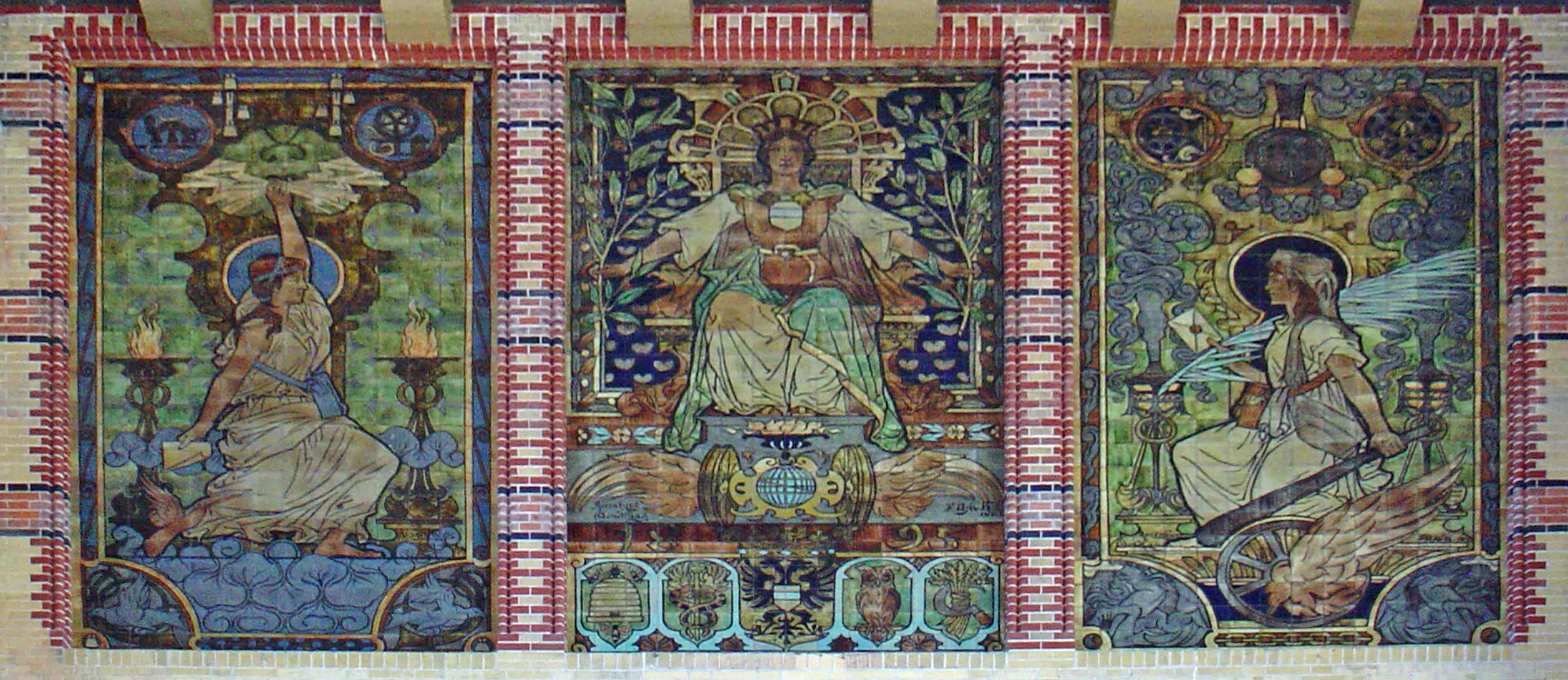
