= Louis Henri de Fontenay =

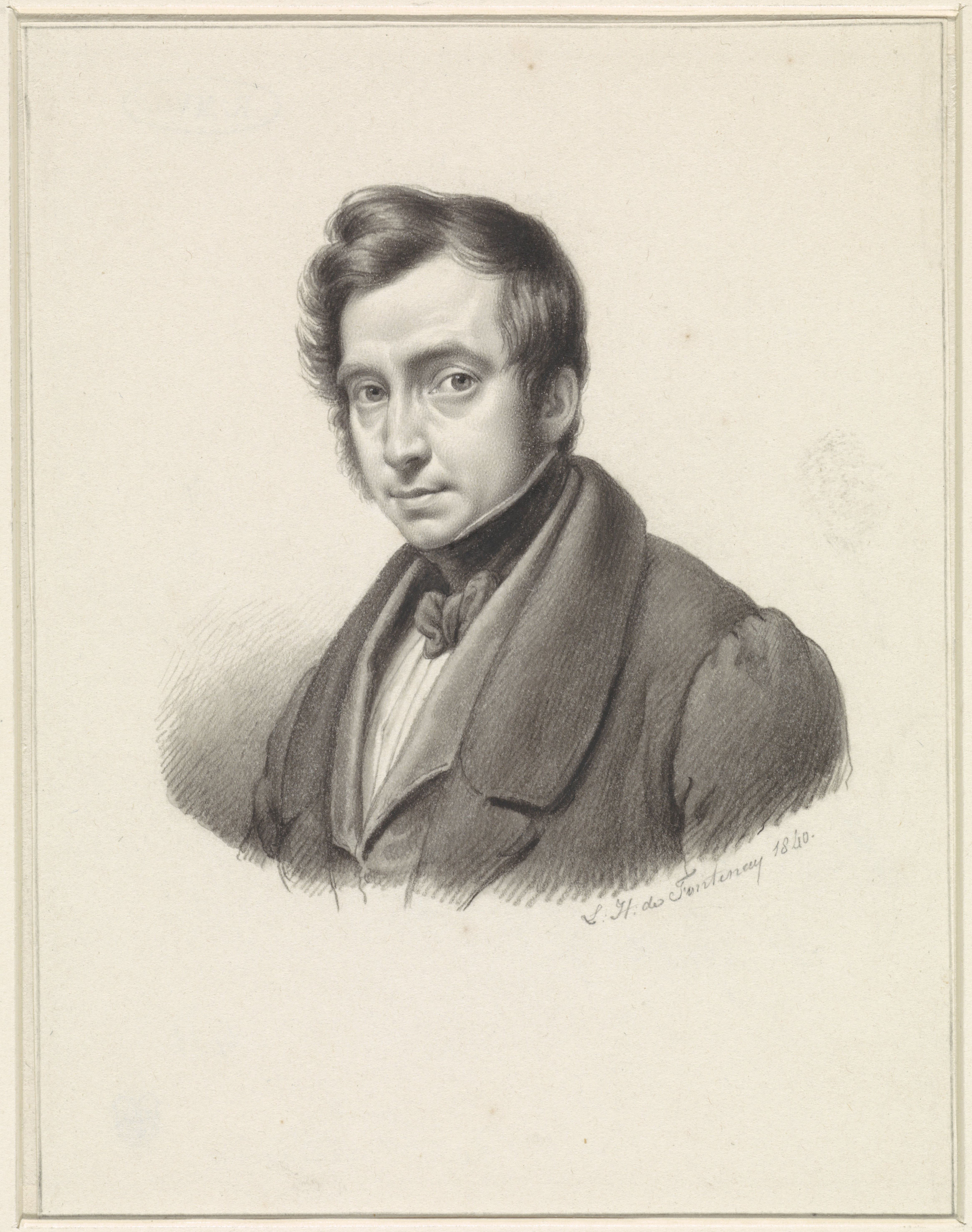
Self-portrait (1840)

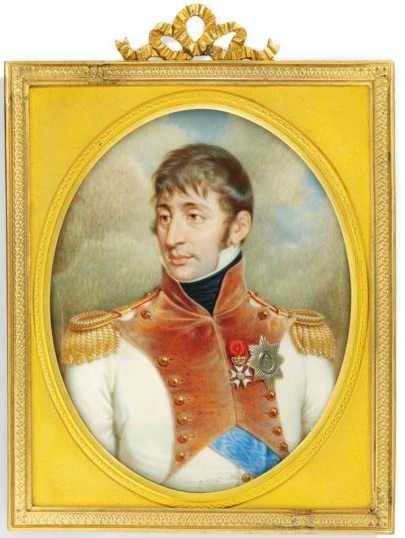
Portrait of Louis Bonaparte

Louis Henri de Fontenay, also known as Ludovicus Henricus de Fontenaij, (15 May 1800, Amsterdam - after 1852, Paris?) was a Dutch painter, draftsman, and lithographer.

== Life and work ==
He was the son of Anthonius Augustinus de Fontenay, a soldier, and Maria Borgman. They were said to be members of the French nobility, who had fled during the Revolution.

His artistic training began at the technical school of the Maatschappij tot Nut van 't Algemeen (Society for Public Welfare) in Amsterdam. He also took lessons from Jacob Smies (1746–1833), a printmaker and illustrator. Much of his work from this period is devoted to interiors and portraits. Sometime in the early 1820s he married his first wife, Thérèse la Vielle (born c.1801). The circumstances of her death are unknown. They had one daughter, Antoinette (1825-1895).

He lived and worked in Amsterdam, except for the years 1822–1828, which he spent in The Hague. Until 1840, he participated in numerous exhibitions in both cities. In 1824, after completing a commission for a portrait of King William I, he was appointed a court painter in charge of portrait miniatures. During the Belgian Revolution, he enlisted in the army; becoming a sergeant-major in the Hague Militia. In the early 1830s, he married his second wife, Constance Egenberger (born 1814), the daughter of an army captain. They also had one daughter, Louise (born 1834).

In 1841, he was a member of the Amsterdam branch of the "United Commission to Erect a Monument for Rembrandt", which was completed in 1852 by the sculptor, Louis Royer. In addition to painting he took students, notably Johan Heinrich Neuman, Henriëtta Christina Temminck and Johannes Hinderikus Egenberger, his wife's nephew.

Although 1850 is usually cited as the year he moved to Paris, he had begun to exhibit at the Salon as early as 1845, and municipal records show him as a resident. In 1853, he presented Emperor Napoleon III with a miniature portrait of his father, Louis Bonaparte. Some of his works bear later dates, but nothing more is known of him. Speculation about the year of his death centers on 1864, when Constance was living alone in Leeuwarden; apparently as a widow.
