= Alexandre de Latour =

Belgian miniaturist

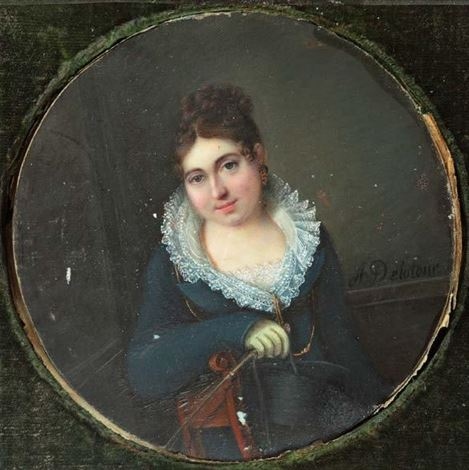
Young woman in a riding outfit, c.1820

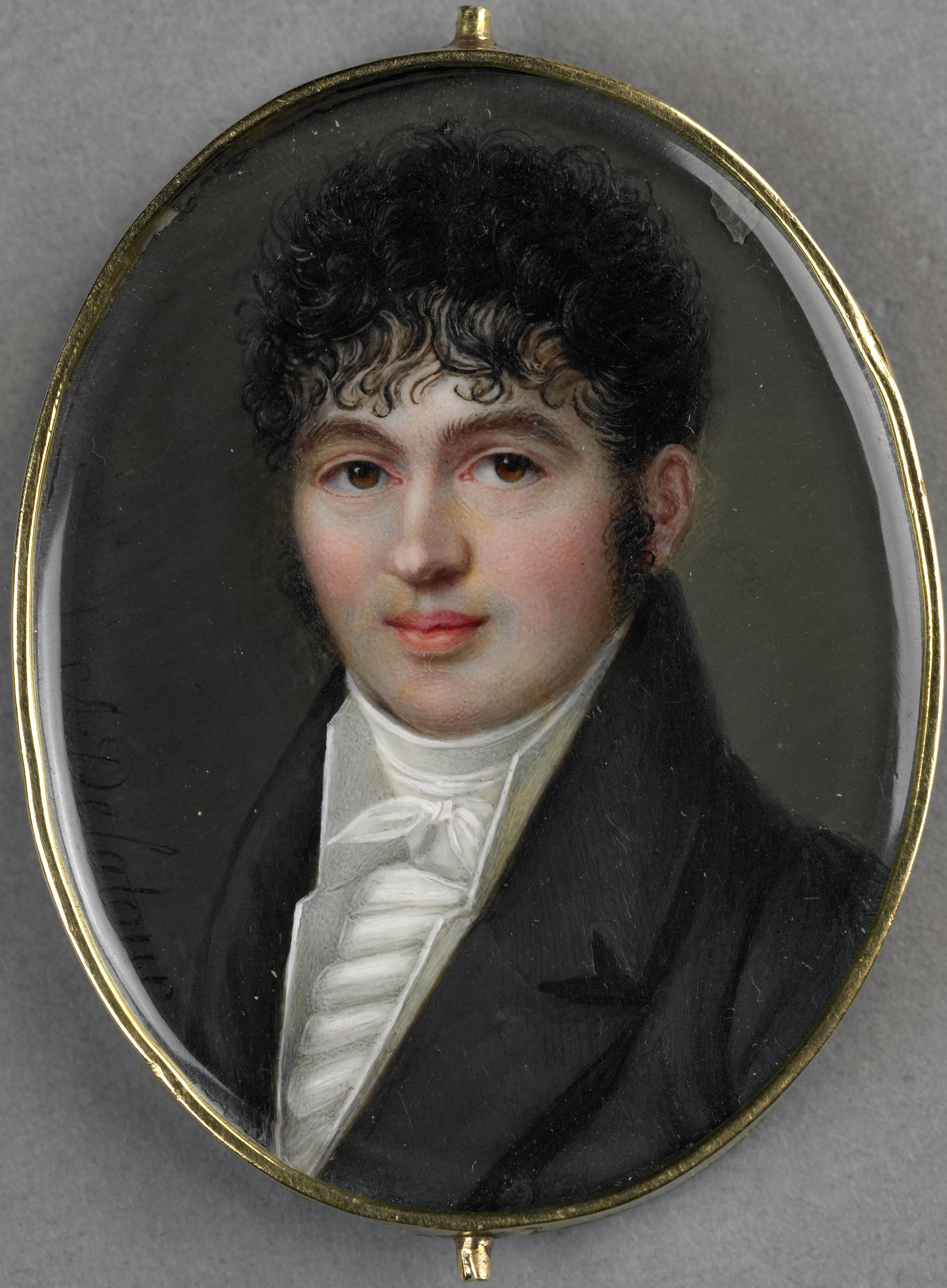
Portrait of an unidentified man, 1810s

Alexandre de Latour or Delatour (22 May 1780, Brussels – 5 November 1858, Brussels) was a Belgian miniaturist. He also produced a few small format oil paintings.

== Life and work ==
He received his first lessons in his family home, from his mother, the painter Marie de Latour née Simons, who specialized in miniatures. He also trained with the famous miniaturist, Louis-Marie Autissier, at his studio in Brussels, as well as in Paris with Jean-Baptiste Jacques Augustin (1802).

His artistic style developed through three regimes; the French First Republic, Napoleonic France, and the United Kingdom of the Netherlands. It was during the latter that he came to the attention of King William I, who appointed him an official miniaturist for the House of Orange. He held a similar position following the establishment of the Kingdom of Belgium in 1831, and was known for his ability to paint accurate portraits from memory.

He was a member of the Royal Academy of Fine Arts (Antwerp) and the Royal Academy of Visual Arts in Amsterdam. He trained numerous students, including his own son, Édouard (1816-1863), who was a genre painter.

From 1804 to 1810, he held regular exhibits at the Paris Salon. He also had a major showing at the Salon in Lille (1822).

His works may be seen at the Royal Museums of Fine Arts of Belgium in Brussels, the Musée des Beaux-Arts de Liège, and the Royal Museum of Fine Arts Antwerp, which has portraits of his parents and a self-portrait.
