= Johannes Hinderikus Egenberger =

Dutch painter (1822–1897)

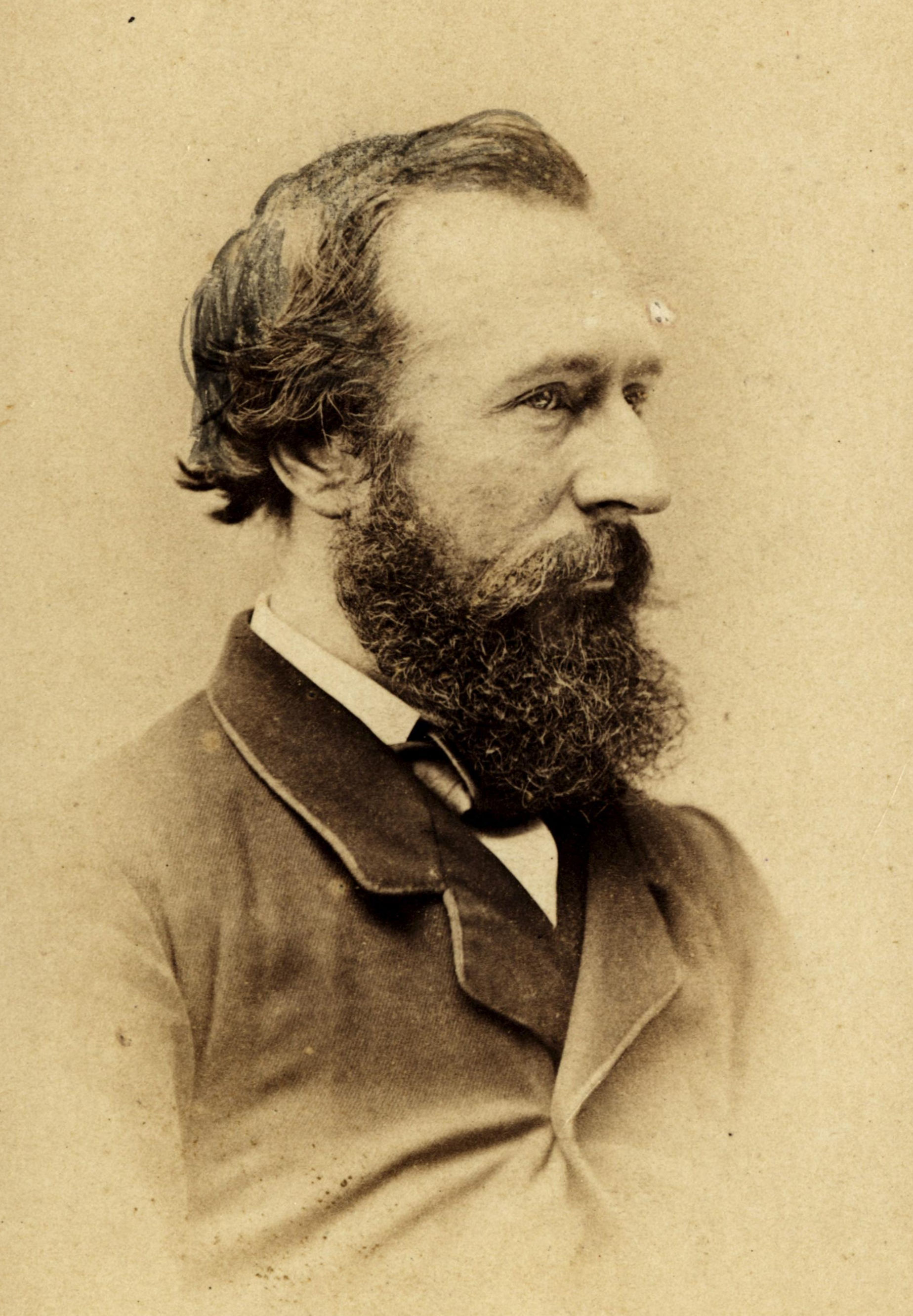
Johannes Hinderikus Egenberger (1868).

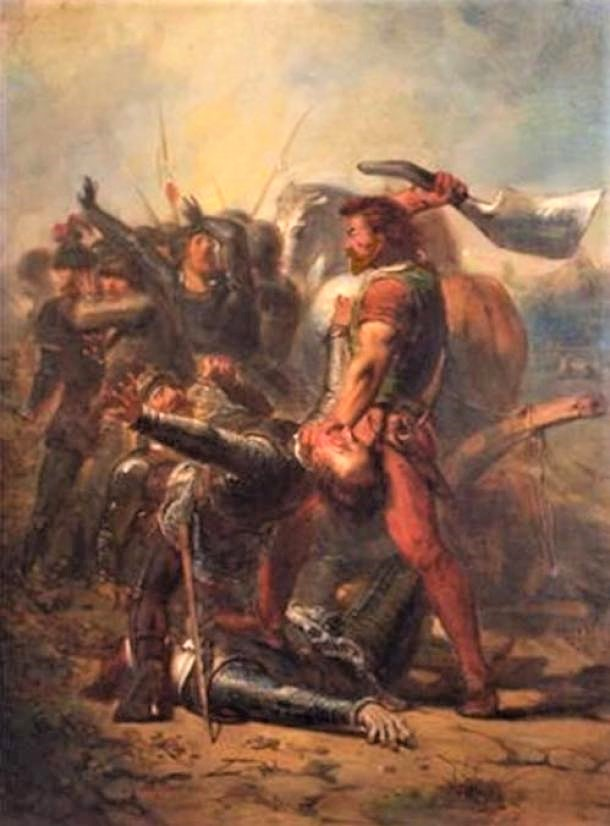
The Bravery of Grote Pier

Johannes Hinderikus Egenberger, originally Joannes Henricus (28 April 1822 – 14 May 1897), was a Dutch painter, photographer and art educator.

== Biography ==
Born into a military family in Arnhem, he received his first drawing lessons from his uncle, Louis Henri de Fontenay. From 1840 to 1848, he studied at the Royal Academy of Fine Arts in Amsterdam with Jan Willem Pieneman. After graduating, he married the actress Christina Margaretha Bartels (1822-1897). From 1852, he was an assistant teacher at the Academie.

During these years, he focused on painting scenes from Dutch history. In 1854, he collaborated with Barend Wijnveld to produce a massive canvas depicting the heroic defense of Haarlem led by Kenau Hasselaer in 1573. Later, he would turn to landscapes, domestic scenes and portraits, including a series for the Rijksuniversiteit.

In 1857, he was appointed Headmaster of the Academie Minerva in Groningen. In addition to his work there, he became a photographer and, in 1864, opened the first photography studio in Groningen. The following year, he resigned his position as Headmaster to devote himself entirely to photography. Shortly after, he opened a branch studio in Leeuwarden and hired his niece Louise's husband to be the manager.

He soon discovered, however, that he could not support his family on his photographic work alone and was allowed to return to his former position at the Academie, where he remained until 1895. Among his best-known students there were Otto Eerelman, Albert Hahn, Hendrik Willem Mesdag and Franciscus Hermanus Bach.

In 1868, a competition was held to design a new memorial for Adolf of Nassau, honoring his death at the Battle of Heiligerlee. Egenberger's design was chosen and executed by the Belgian sculptor, Joseph Geefs. The memorial was dedicated in 1873, with King William III present.

He died in Utrecht in May 1897.
