= Kenau =

2014 film

- Film poster
- Directed by: Maarten Treurniet
- Starring: Monic Hendrickx; Barry Atsma
- Release date: 6 March 2014
- Running time: 113 minutes
- Countries: Netherlands; Hungary; Belgium
- Languages: Dutch; French; Spanish

Kenau is a 2014 Dutch / Hungarian / Belgian action film directed by Maarten Treurniet. The film is inspired by the legendary story of Kenau who led an army of women in the siege of Haarlem by the Spaniards in 1573 during the Eighty Years' War between the Netherlands and Spain.

The filmmakers admitted that much of the story is fiction, such as the execution of her daughter, and the relationship with her youngest daughter. And in general there is not much known of the historical Kenau figure. In 1956, Haarlem archivist Gerda Kurtz demythologised the story of Kenau and her women's squabbles in his book Kenu Symonsdochter van Haerlem. According to Kurtz, it was unusual for Dutch women to fight in wartime. It seems more likely that Kenau played an active role in wall repairs.

== Cast ==
- Monic Hendrickx as Kenau Simonsdochter Hasselaer
- Barry Atsma as Wigbold Ripperda
- Sallie Harmsen as Kathelijne
- Lisa Smit as Gertruide
- Matthijs van de Sande Bakhuyzen as Pieter Ripperda
- Anne-Marie Jung as Bertha
- Sophie van Winden as Magdalena
