= Shahine El-Hamus =

Dutch actor and rapper (born 2000)

- Born: 2000 (age 25–26)
- Occupations: Actor, rapper
- Awards: Golden Calf for Best Actor 2020 The Promise of Pisa

Shahine El-Hamus (born 2000) is a Dutch actor and rapper. He won the Golden Calf for Best Actor award at the 2020 Netherlands Film Festival for his role in the 2019 film The Promise of Pisa directed by Norbert ter Hall.

== Career ==
El-Hamus appears in a television series based on the book Bestseller Boy by Dutch novelist and columnist Mano Bouzamour. He also appears in the 2022 film Met mes directed by Sam de Jong.

El-Hamus plays a role in the 2025 film Straatcoaches vs Aliens directed by Michael Middelkoop.

== Personal life ==
His brother Shady El-Hamus is a film director; he made his directorial debut with the 2019 film About That Life.

== Awards ==
- 2020: Golden Calf for Best Actor, The Promise of Pisa

== Filmography ==
=== Films ===
- Femme (Korte film) (2017)
- Het Bestand (2017)
- Vals (2019)
- The Promise of Pisa (2019)
- Met mes (2022)
- Crypto Boy (2023)
- Straatcoaches vs Aliens (2025)

=== Television series ===
- Adam en Eva
- Lieve Mama (2020)

Safe Harbour (2025)
