= Juliana Cornelia de Lannoy =

Dutch artist (1738–1782)

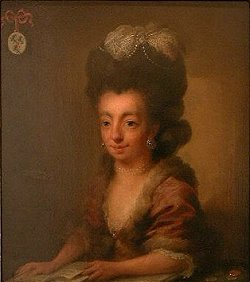
Portrait of Juliana Cornelia de Lannoy, by Niels Rode

Juliana de Lannoy (1738–1782) was an artist and poet from the Dutch Republic.

== Biography ==
She was born in Breda, North Brabant, as the oldest child of an officer who left home to serve in the War of the Austrian Succession. Her mother decided to move back to her parents' house in 1743, after her youngest girl died, and so, Juliana's formative years were spent in Nijmegen. Within a short period Juliana lost all of her family members. Her grandfather died in 1746, followed by her grandmother. Her younger brother died in 1747 and her mother in 1750. Her father returned wounded from the war and so Juliana was sent to his family in Zutphen. Her father remarried Pauline Aleida Putman of Deventer and in 1752 Juliana moved there with them. Her half-brother Adolf Hendrik was born the next year. In 1758, the family moved to St. Geertruidenberg where Juliana's father lived on the Markt in the house called "De Roos", today a museum. She died in St. Geertruidenberg.

== Works ==
She is known for her wit and commentary on women in society, and often wrote about strong women, most notably Kenau Simonsdochter Hasselaer, who featured in her play about the siege of Haarlem in 1770 that she dedicated to William V, Prince of Orange. According to the RKD She is known for plays, poems, watercolours, works on silk.

- "Aan myn Geest", Breda, 1766, reprinted 1767
- "Leo de Groote", Tragedy, Amsterdam, 1767, reprinted 1808
- "De belegering van Haerlem", Tragedy, Amsterdam, 1770, reprinted 1796
- "Cleopatra, koningin van Syriën", Tragedy, Amsterdam, 1776
- "Dichtkundige werken", Leiden, 1780
- "Nagelaten dichtwerken", Leiden, 1783
