= Graziella Curreli =

French sculptor

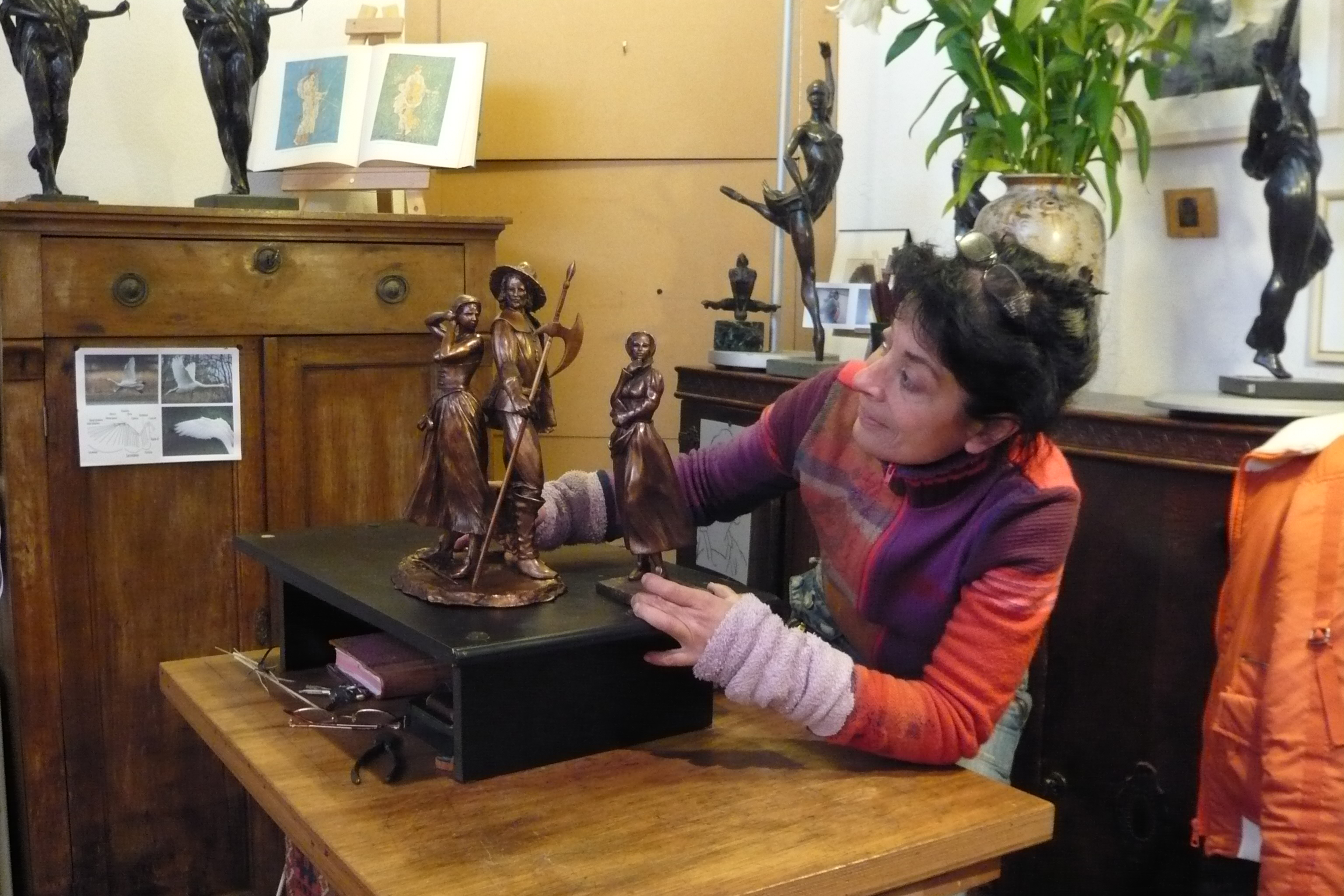
Graziella Curreli with model for Kenau-Ripperda monument from 2009 and Kenau model for Kenau Hasselaer Prijs from 2008

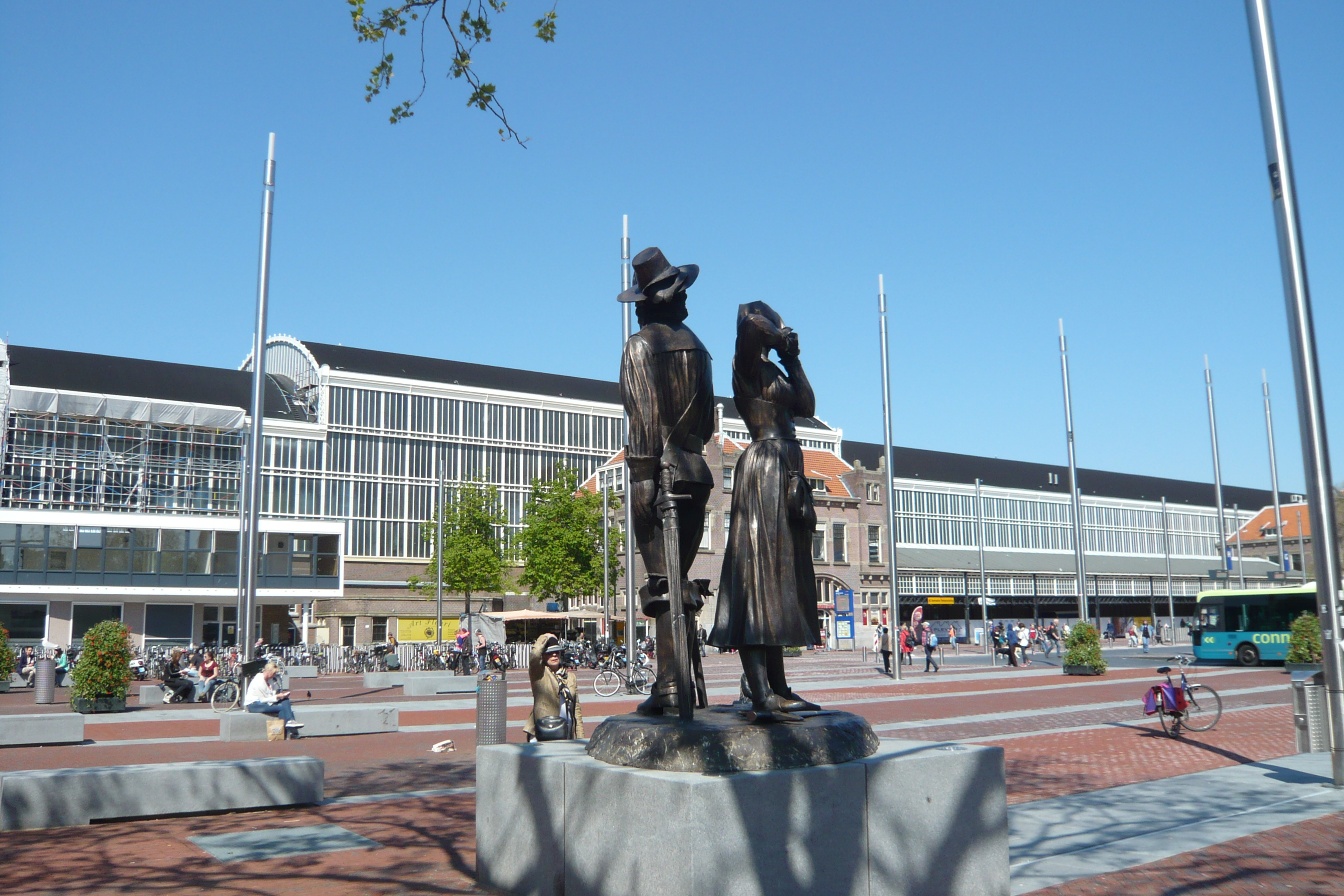
Kenau-Ripperda monument, view towards the Haarlem Railway Station

Graziella Curreli (born 1960), is a French sculptor working in Haarlem, the Netherlands. She specializes in bronze figures and is known for her sculptures of strong women, most notably Kenau Simonsdochter Hasselaer.

== Education and Career ==
She attended the Sorbonne. She has created works for the city of Haarlem and for the city of Diemen. Her bronze of Kenau and Wigbolt Ripperda for Haarlem was originally designed in a smaller version for the Ripperda renovation project in 2009, but was rejected in favor of a more abstract work. She was then contracted by the Haarlem councilman Chris van Velzen in April 2010 to construct a much larger version, and though he died the same year, the project has been realised and the result is 4 meters high. Her first sculpture of Kenau was made for the Kenau Hasselaarsprijs, a yearly prize for promoting emancipation.

== Recognition ==
In 2009, she was commissioned the creation of a medal for the Lieven de Key Award. The award is a cultural event named after the first Haarlem City Architect, Lieven de Key. It is awarded annually to a person or organisation that distinguished themselves in the field of heritage preservation, urbanism and architectural projects. The first edition is in public display in the medal collection cabinets in the Teylers Museum, first recipient of the Lieven de Key Award and very first museum of The Netherlands.
