= De wederopstanding van een klootzak =

2013 Dutch drama film

- Theatrical release poster
- Directed by: Guido van Driel
- Written by: Guido van Driel; Erik de Bruyn
- Based on: Om mekaar in Dokkum by Guido van Driel
- Produced by: Frans van Gestel; Arnold Heslenfeld
- Starring: Yorick van Wageningen; Juda Goslinga; Goua Robert Grovogui
- Cinematography: Lennert Hillege
- Edited by: Alain Dessauvage
- Music by: Peter van Laerhoven
- Production companies: Topkapi Films; Menuet; VPRO
- Distributed by: A-Film Distribution
- Release date: 21 February 2013
- Running time: 89 minutes
- Country: Netherlands
- Language: Dutch

De wederopstanding van een klootzak (English: "The resurrection of a bastard") is a 2013 Dutch drama film by Guido van Driel. The film stars Yorick van Wageningen, Juda Goslinga, and Goua Robert Grovogui; it is one of three films in which Jeroen Willems, who died in 2012, appears posthumously. It was selected to open the 2013 International Film Festival Rotterdam.

== Background ==
Guido van Driel, a cartoonist from Amsterdam, was assigned a graphic novel related to Saint Boniface, on the occasion of the 1250 anniversary of his martyrdom, by the Dongeradeel municipality in which Dokkum is located, the place of the saint's martyrdom. Om mekaar in Dokkum was published in 2004, and van Driel realized the opportunity for a film and wrote the screenplay based on his book. It took until the early 2010s for the financing to be available. De wederopstanding is his first movie; he co-wrote the screenplay with Bas Blokker.

== Plot ==
Publicity photo; Ronnie is second from left.

Ronnie is a violent criminal from Amsterdam who miraculously survives an attempt on his life, and goes to Friesland with his bodyguard Janus to track down his would-be assassin. His quest is blended with that of Eduardo, an asylum seeker from Angola, who becomes acquainted with the life of Saint Boniface. In the account of the saint's chopping down of the Donar Oak he recognizes the connection between Frisian trees and his own belief in magic imported from Africa; both hail from a pre-Christian tradition and a world in which nature is worshiped. Their stories come together in the movie's finale.

Ronnie has completely changed since the attack on his life. Earlier, he was a ruthless and violent killer who beat a woman to death because her husband owed him money; now calmer, he is open to the world of sense and takes unprecedented pleasure in food. A scene in which he admires and relishes the smell of a plate of trout with pomegranate is particularly notable, and betrays van Driel's background as a cartoonist.

== Cast ==
- Yorick van Wageningen as Ronnie
- Juda Goslinga as Janus
- Goua Robert Grovogui as Eduardo
- Jeroen Willems as James Joyce

== Reception and criticism ==
Reviews in the Dutch papers were mostly positive though with minor notes of criticism. NRC Handelsblad rated the film 4 out of 5. The movie's violence prompted mixed reactions—a scene in which Ronnie sucks up someone's eyeball with a vacuum cleaner was widely discussed, and André Waardenburg, movie critic for NRC, criticized van Driel and fellow screenplay writer Blokker for approaching Quentin Tarantino in a monologue by mob boss James Joyce about singed canaries. Nu.nl reviewer André Nientied also gave the movie 4 out of 5 stars, commenting that the two sides of the movie seemed disjointed and their connection forced. Berend Jan Bockting praised van Driel's style, Lennert Hillege's camera work, and van Wageningen's performance in a 4/5 review in de Volkskrant. Eric Koch in De Telegraaf also praised the camera work and the acting, and criticized the dual story line.
