= Kenau Simonsdochter Hasselaer =

Dutch wood merchanter (1526–1588)

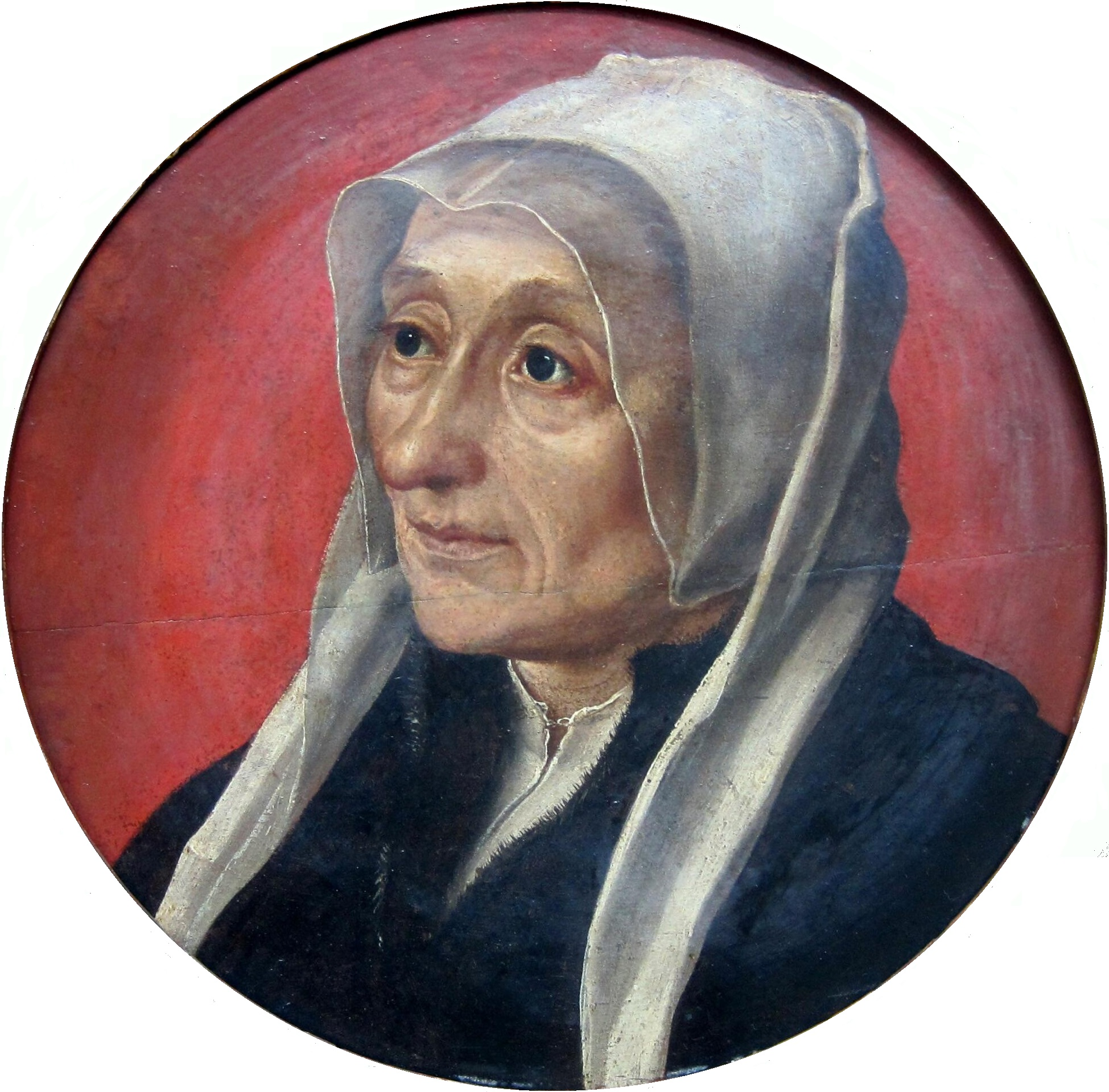
- 16th century portrait of a woman from the Hasselaer family, assumed to be Kenau, and used in the 18th century as a basis for an engraving by Reinier Vinkeles
- Born: 1526
- Died: 1588 (aged 61–62)
- Occupation: wood merchant
- Known for: 1573 siege of Haarlem

Kenau Simonsdochter Hasselaer (1526–1588) was a wood merchant of Haarlem, who became a legendary folk hero for her fearless defense of the city against the Spanish invaders during the siege of Haarlem in 1573.

== Biography ==
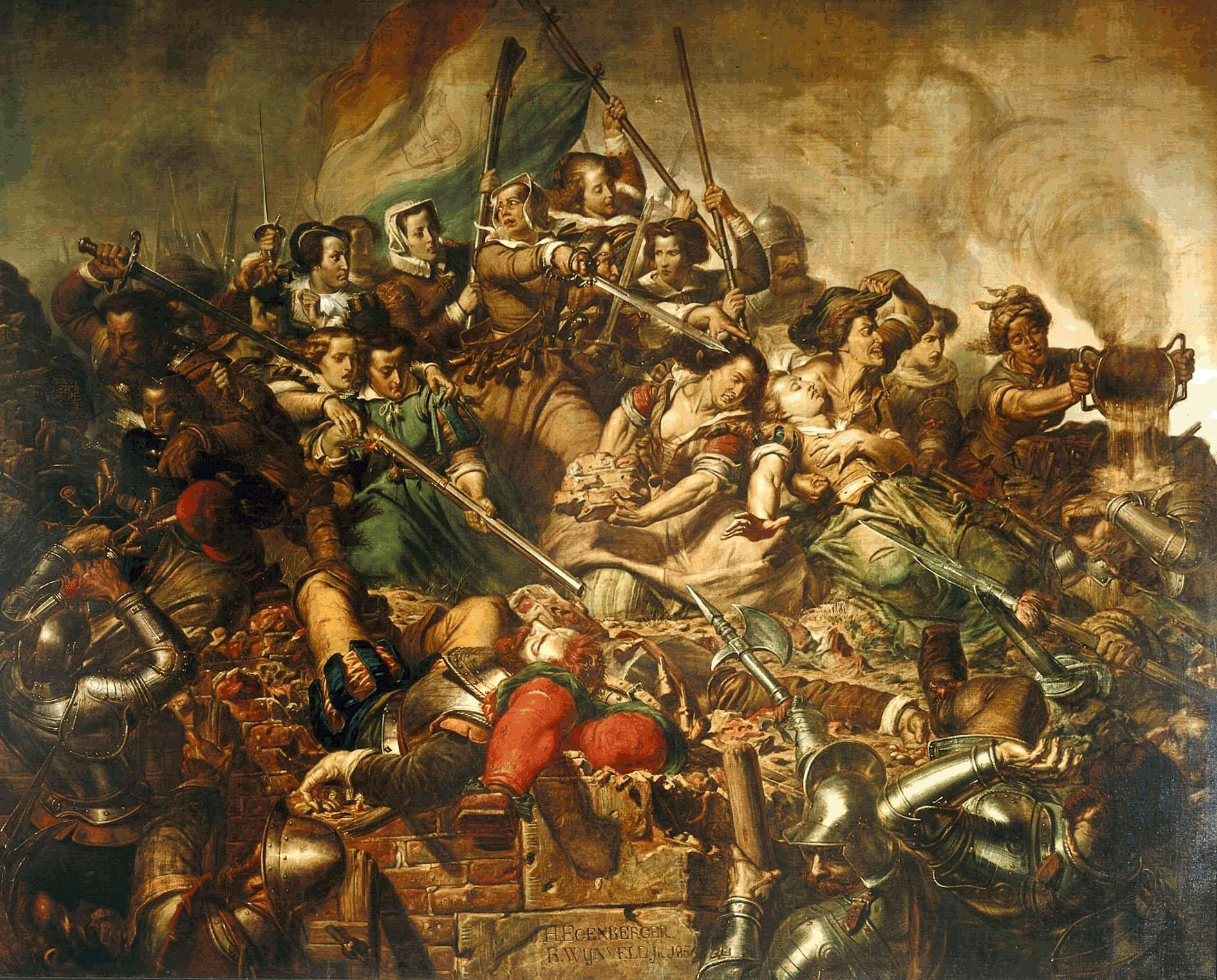
Romanticized historical painting of Kenau leading a group of 300 women in defense of Haarlem, by Barend Wijnveld and J.H. Egenberger, 1854

She was the daughter of the Haarlem brewer Simon Gerrits and Guerte Koen Hasselaer. When the city was besieged by the Spanish, period diarists reported that all of the townspeople, man, woman, and child, fearlessly helped to rebuild the city defenses that had been destroyed by enemy cannon. One account written in Latin from Delft, mentioned Kenau by name as an unusually fearless woman who worked night and day carrying earth to the city walls to rebuild the defense line.

This (anonymous) account mentioned in the next paragraph how the people of Haarlem stood on these earthworks and threw burning tar wreaths around the necks of the enemy, and described how one Spanish soldier jumped into the river Spaarne to douse the flames only to drown from the weight of his armor. Somehow the story arose that it was Kenau who threw these 'tar wreaths'. Kenau’s role as an earth carrier was soon glorified into a full-fledged soldier who was honored at the centennial celebrations of independence from Spain in 1673 and again during the bicentenary in 1773. By the 19th century she had led an army of 300 women against the Spanish, which had even been commemorated in a romantic painting by Barent Wijnveld and J.H. Egenberger.

== Authenticity ==
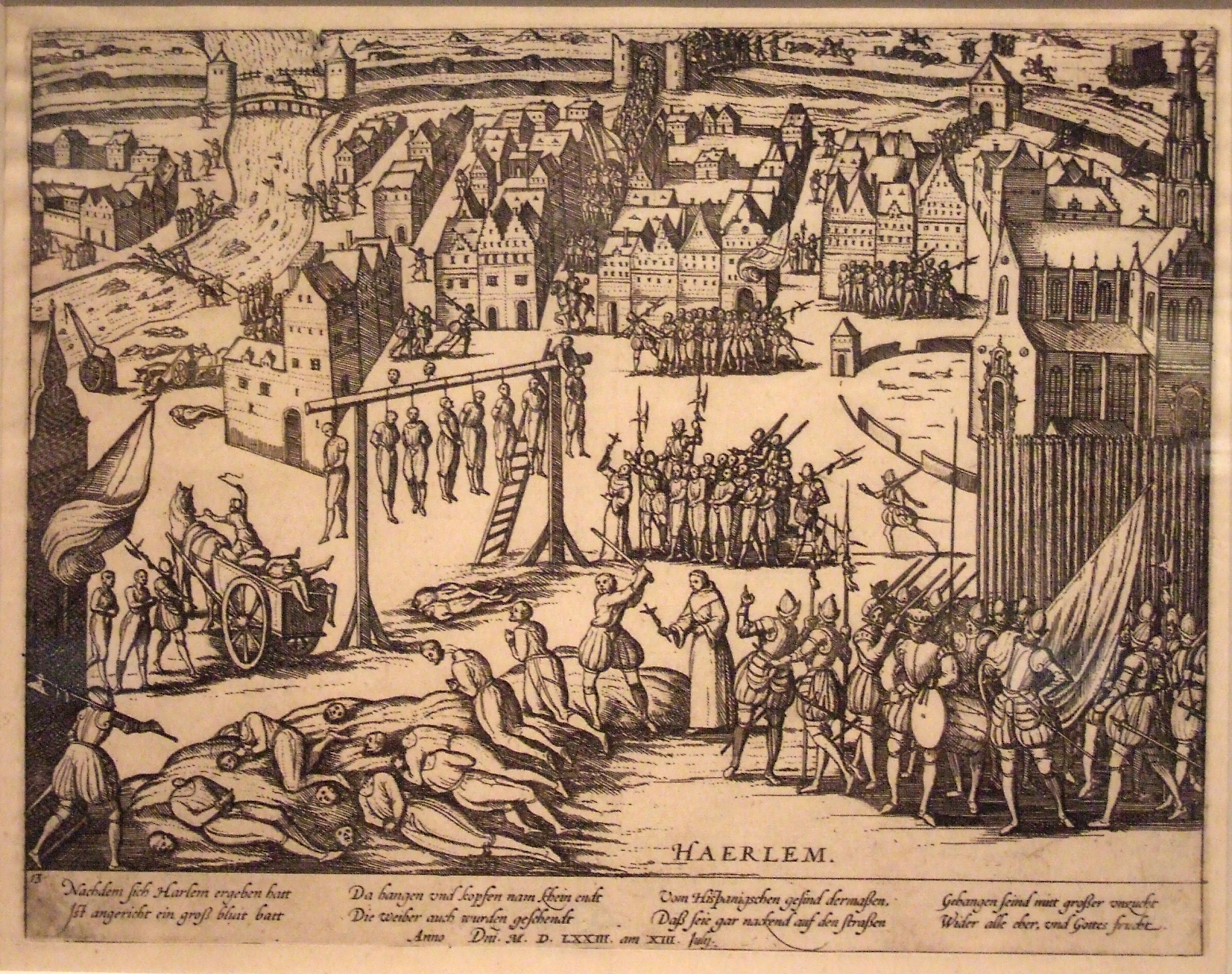
Haarlem soldiers being executed by the Spanish after the siege; all are men

It was the Haarlem doctor and historian Dr. C. Ekama who first questioned the Kenau legend in 1872 on the eve of the tricentenary celebrations. He pointed out that neither she nor any other woman had been placed on the list of 'war criminals' after the Spanish took control, while her 18-year-old cousin Pieter Dirksz Hasselaer, a member of the schutterij, was on the list and was arrested, though later released. However, women were generally not seen as war criminals or beheaded, and thus not mentioned as such. Additionally, women fighting to defend a city were not uncommon in that time such as during the attack of Antwerp in 1576 (Spaanse Furie) where a citizen's army of 12,000 men and women built ramparts and fought against the Spanish.

== Archival evidence ==
She married Nanning Gerbrandsz Borst around 1544. They had four children: Guerte, Margriet, Lubbrich, and Gerbrand. After the death of her husband in 1562 she continued his business. After her daughter Lubbrecht died, she took the motherless son of her brother Coen into her home, also called Guerte, like her daughter. She was the sister-in-law of Hadrianus Junius and left Haarlem soon after the siege ended. Through him she probably came into contact with the Delft brewer David Jansz, with whom she made a contract in grain trade. Through this trade she heard of a lucrative post in Arnemuiden, which she won; by resolution of 2 September 1574, she became Weighing House Master and Collector of Peat in the city of Arnemuiden. In 1577, she is mentioned in documents as an inhabitant of Leiden "op de vliet". Not long after, she returned to Haarlem, where her son Gerbrand had become an independent shipbuilder. In 1579 her name appears in the shipyard lists, but she was apparently not documented as a returning hero. In fact she went to great trouble in 1585 to receive money from the Haarlem council for wood delivered during the siege that was never paid for. In 1593 some money was paid to her daughters.

She bought a ship to resume her trade as wood merchant, which made about five trips per year to Norway. The captain was taken hostage and Kenau went to great lengths to have him released, but apparently she travelled north and became the victim of pirates herself, according to her daughters. In May 1589, her daughters sued skipper Lieven Hansz from Holstein for this ship. During the trial, it was proven that she had left port for Norway in 1588 and disappeared. Lieven Hansz stated that he had bought the ship in Flensburg from the port official charged with selling deserted ships. It is therefore often assumed that she died at the hands of pirates, but other theories too exist.

== Legacy ==
In 1800 the Batavian Republic named a frigate, the Kenau Haselaar after her.

Her name lives on in colloquial Dutch. Originally, it stood for female bravery, but as social role models developed, the word kenau came to stand for "shrew".

In 2014 a Dutch film was released about her with Monic Hendrickx in the lead role.

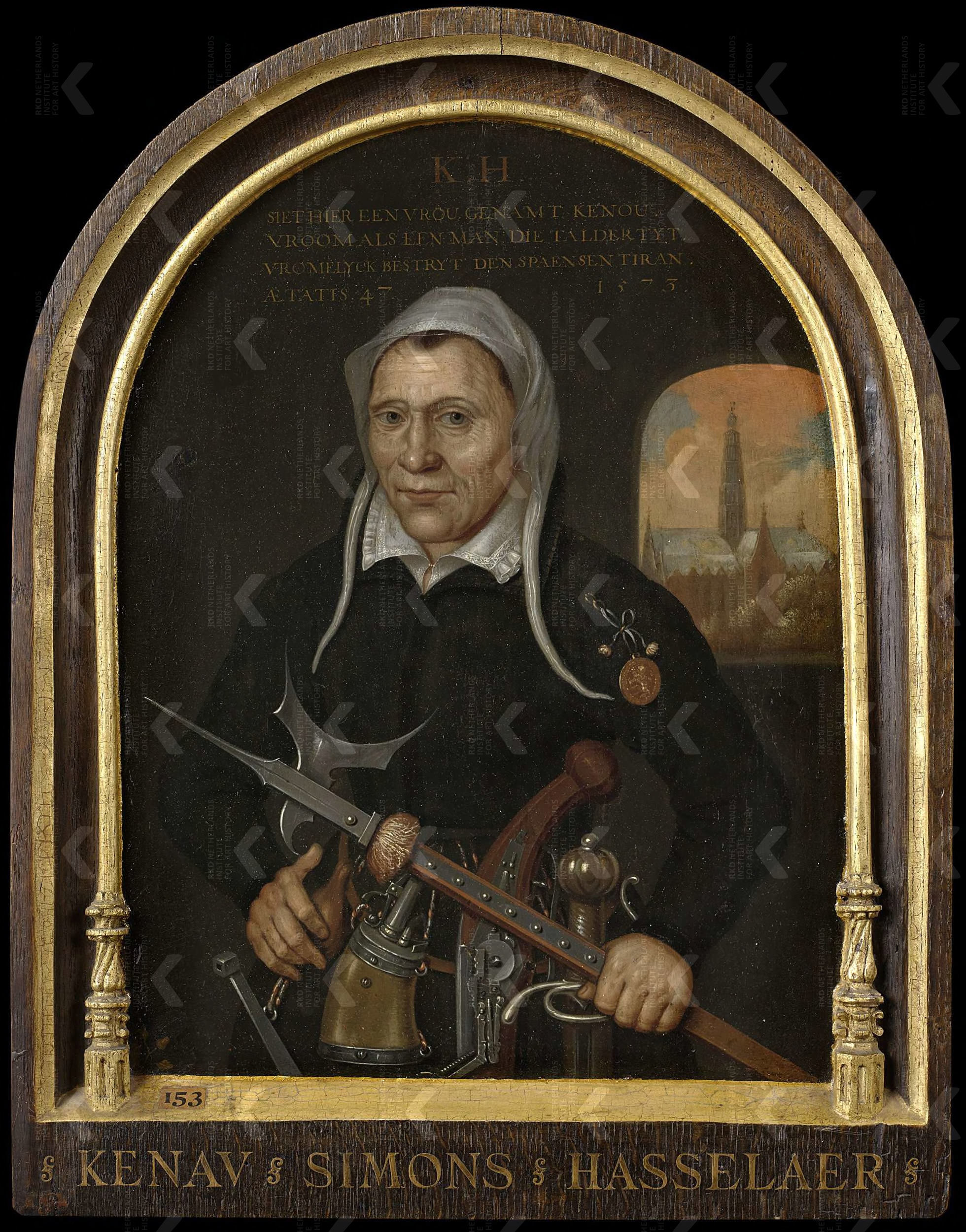
Fantasy portrait of Kenau with weapons, aged 47 in 1573.

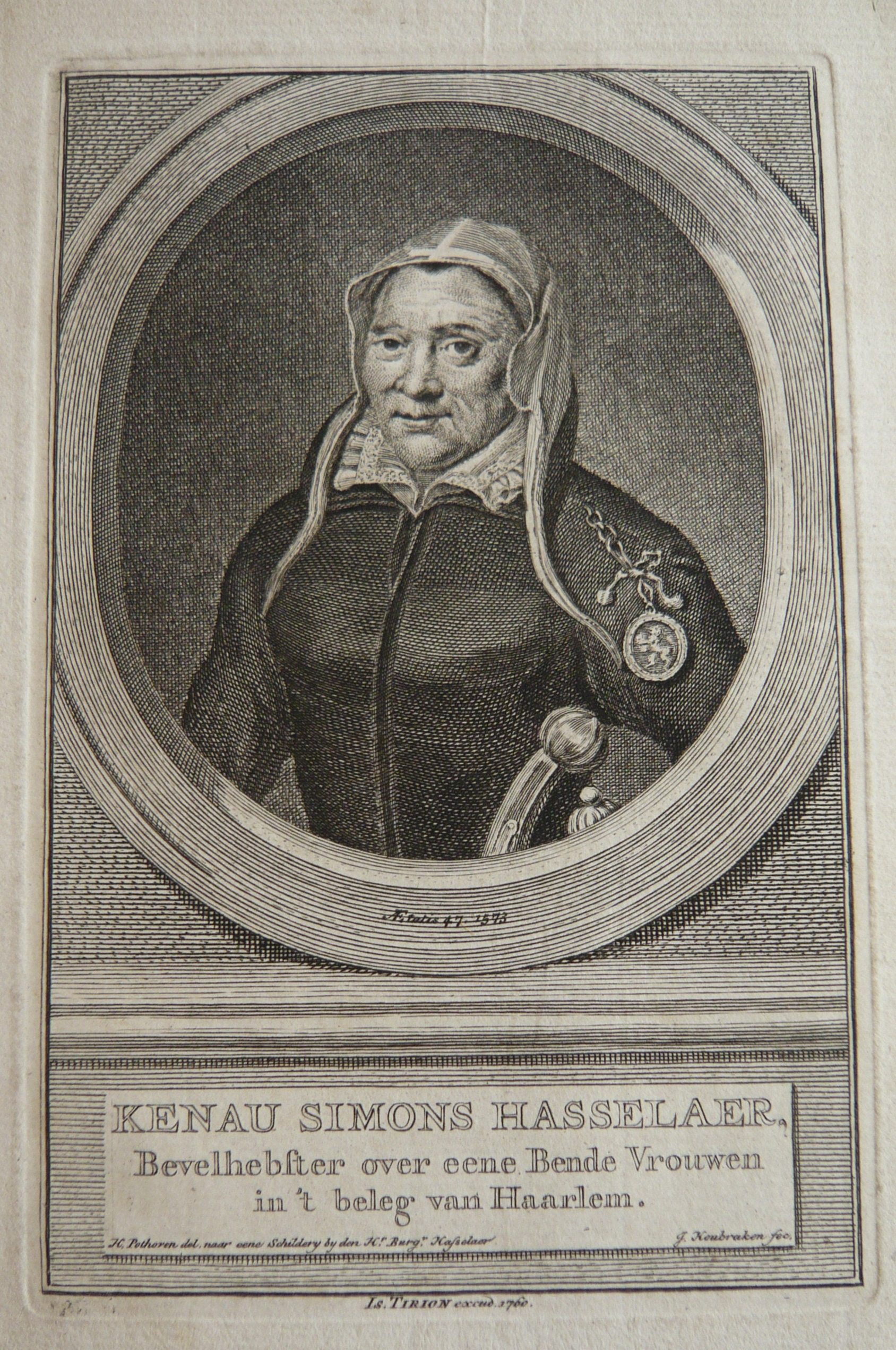
Kenau engraving by Jacob Houbraken after the fantasy portrait

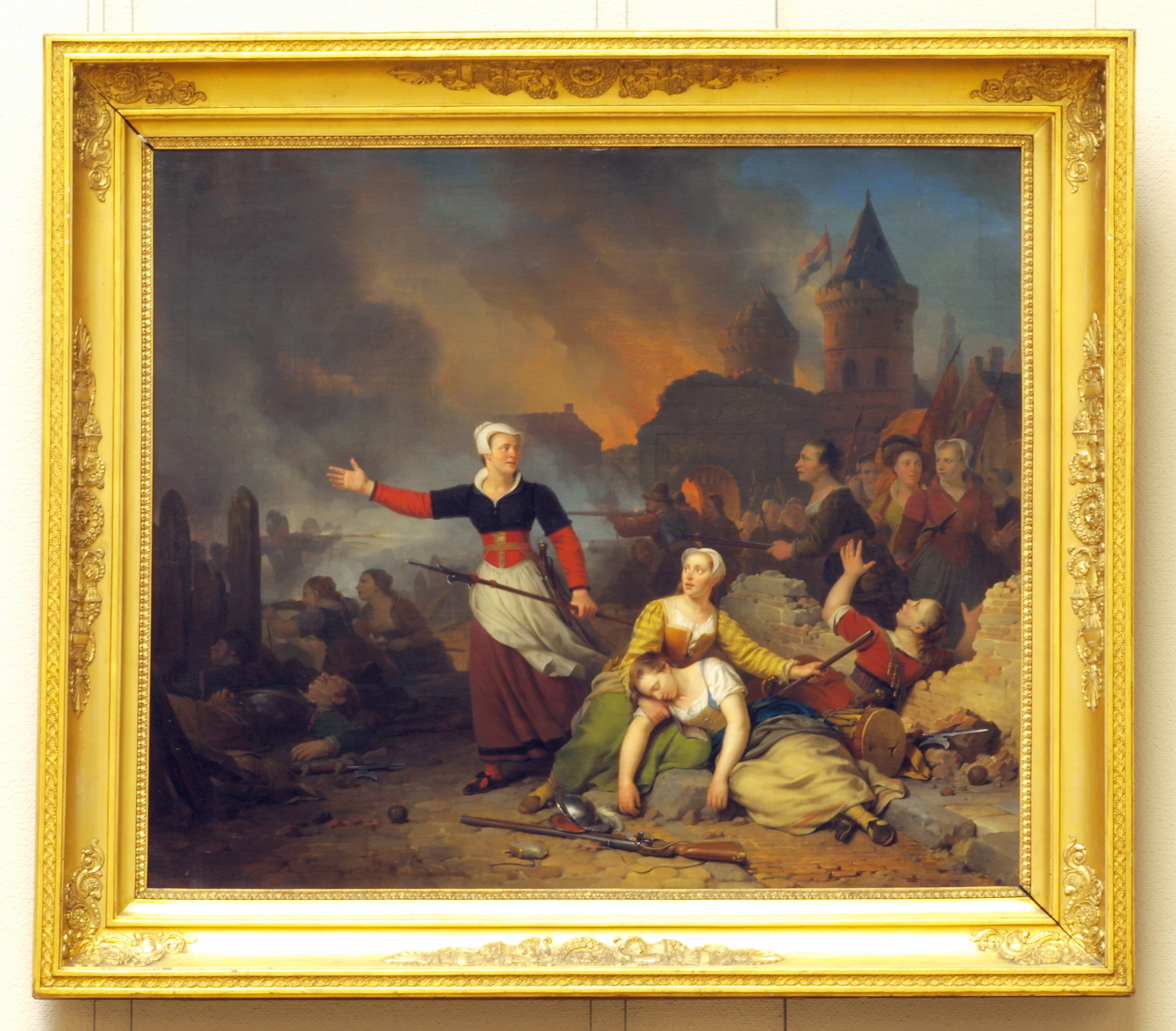
Kenau leading Haarlem women, by Ferdinand de Braekeleer the Elder, 1829

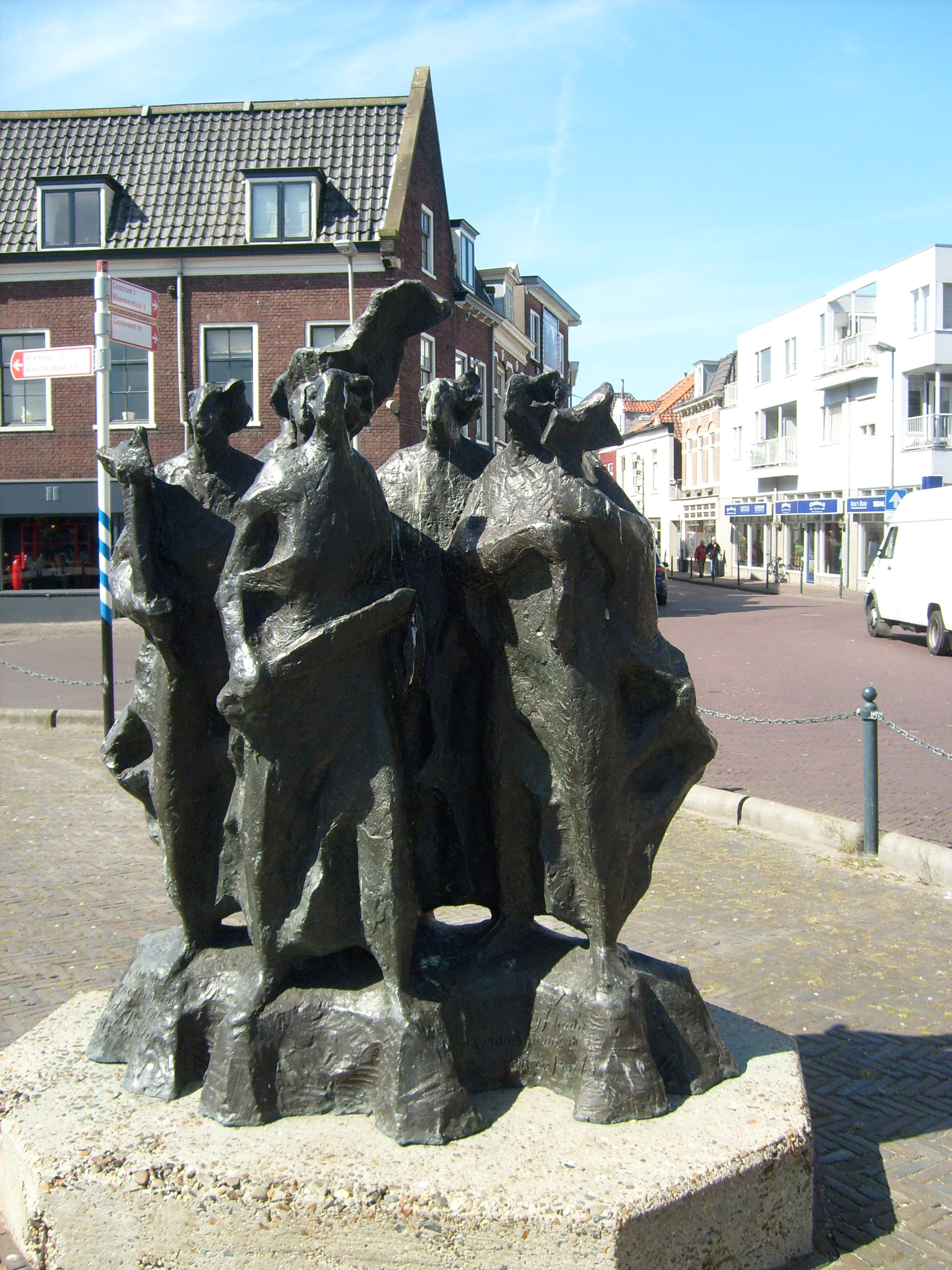
Kenau leading Haarlem women in front of the Amsterdamse Poort (Haarlem), by sculptor Theo Mulder

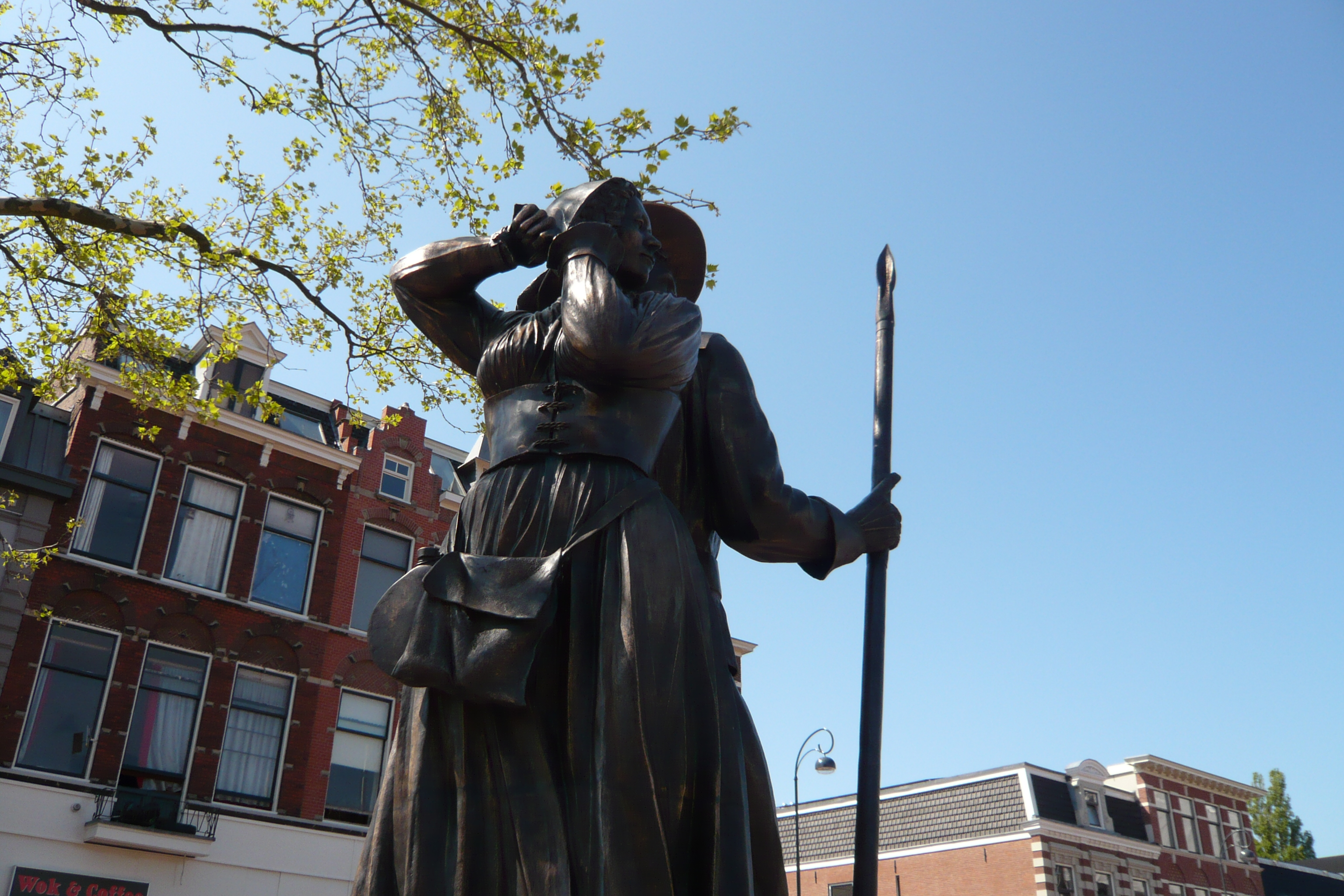
Kenau with Wigbolt Ripperda on the Stationsplein Haarlem, by sculptor Graziella Curreli
