= Wij, Alexander =

- Directed by: Rimko Haanstra
- Country of origin: Netherlands
- Original languages: Dutch; French
- No. of seasons: 1
- No. of episodes: 8

Production
- Running time: 45 minutes

Original release
- Release: November 10, 1998

Wij, Alexander is a 1998 Dutch television series directed by Rimko Haanstra, son of Bert Haanstra, and broadcast by the KRO. Eight episodes at 45 minutes were shot.

== Cast ==
- Jacques Commandeur as Patiënt nr. 4
- Hugo Haenen as Dokter Jan Giltay
- Hilde Heijnen as Catharina Wauters
- Thekla Reuten as Eveline Roëll
- Rik van Uffelen as Professor De Vreeze
- Kees Hulst as Verduyn
- Tom Jansen as Professor De Zwaan
- Jack Wouterse as Verpleger Rinus Vermeer
- Brenda Bertin as Geertje
- René Eljon as Karel
- Arjan Kindermans as Scholten
- Jeroen Willems as Dokter van Leeuwen
- Carine Crutzen as Koningin Sophie
- Porgy Franssen as Koning Willem III
- René van Asten as Secretaris Van Dijck
- Huib Broos as Koning Willem II
- Rob van Reyn as Jantje (Lakei in inrichting)
- Noepie van der Poll as Buurmeisje van Eveline
