= Pierre Heijboer =

Dutch journalist (1937–2014)

- Born: 7 May 1937; Hoensbroek, Netherlands
- Died: 23 March 2014 (aged 76); Amsterdam, Netherlands
- Education: Kweekschool voor onderwijzers
- Years active: 1968–1997

Pierre Heijboer (Hoensbroek, 7 May 1937 – Amsterdam, 23 March 2014) was a Dutch journalist.

== Career ==
Heijboer initially worked for the Limburgs Dagblad and the Nieuwe Eindhovense Courant. In 1968, Heijboer moved to Amsterdam, where he started working for Het Parool. He settled in the new Bijlmer neighborhood. From 1980, he worked as domestic editor for de Volkskrant. In 1983, Heijboer became an editor in Maastricht, he lived in Wijnandsrade for some time. Together with his colleague Hans Horsten, he conducted research into the Dutch Civil Servants Pension Fund, which turned out to receive extra subsidies due to fraud. State secretary Gerrit Brokx had to resign in 1986 as a result of the affair and a parliamentary inquiry into construction subsidies followed later that year, led by Klaas de Vries.

Heijboer took early retirement in 1997.

=== Bijlmer disaster ===
Heijboer investigated the Bijlmer disaster that took place in Bijlmermeer in 1992. He followed the parliamentary inquiry into the Bijlmer disaster of 1998–1999 very critically. From day to day, he provided the probes with critical commentary.

Heijboer was convinced that the Parliamentary Commission of Inquiry had not found the truth about the disaster; according to him, El Al's Boeing 747 had been a military aircraft.

Under the name Het Klankbord (The Sounding Board) he collected facts about the Bijlmer disaster that were concealed during the parliamentary inquiry. He paid particular attention to the victims. He wrote a book about it, Doemvlucht: de verzwegen geheimen van de Bijlmerramp (Flight of Doom: The Hidden Secrets of the Bijlmer Disaster), which was published in 2002.

In 2003, Heijboer demanded compensation from the Aviation Enforcement Service, because the service allegedly tampered with a file on helicopter flights over the Bijlmer, which Heijboer had requested in reliance on the Dutch Public Access to Government Information Act. The Dutch Association of Journalists supported Heijboer in his demand. A few years later, he published Wachten op de nachtegaal: het verhaal van de Bijlmermeer (2006, Waiting for the Nightingale: The Story of the Bijlmermeer) about forty years of Bijlmer, from dream neighborhood to the most maligned locale in the Netherlands.

Heijboer's investigation into the disaster plays a major role in Rampvlucht (Disaster Flight), a TV drama series published in 2022. Heijboer was played by Yorick van Wageningen.

=== Indonesia ===
In 1977, Heijboer wrote Klamboes, klewangs, klapperbomen: Indië gewonnen en verloren (Mosquito Nets, Klewangs, Coconut Palms: The Indies Won and Lost). A book about the politionele acties in the Dutch East Indies (present-day Indonesia) followed in 1979, which was translated into Malay in 1998. At the end of his life, Heijboer researched the experiences of Dutch and Indonesian soldiers during the skirmishes in West New Guinea in 1962. De eer en de ellende: Nieuw–Guinea 1962 (The Honor and the Misery: New Guinea 1962) was published in 2012.

== Personal life ==
Heijboer was born near the Dutch State Mine "Emma" as the son of a miner. He attended the Hogere Burgerschool and the Kweekschool voor onderwijzers (Training school for teachers) and then took a journalism course in Nijmegen. Heijboer performed his military service in 't Harde. Heijboer died at the age of 76 from cancer and kidney problems. He was buried on 29 March 2014.

== Bibliography ==
- Klamboes, klewangs, klapperbomen: Indië gewonnen en verloren (Mosquito Nets, Klewangs, Coconut Palms: The Indies Won and Lost). 1977. ISBN 9022839184
- Kampioenen en krukken in kniebroek: beelden en berichten uit de kinderjaren van de sport (Champions and Crutches in Shorts: Images and Messages From the Sport's Infancy). 1978. ISBN 9022838579
- De politionele acties: de strijd om 'Indië' 1945/1949 (The Politionele Acties: The Struggle for the "Indies" 1945/1949). 1979. ISBN 9022838722
- Reizen door een onvoltooid verleden: het oude Indië in het nieuwe Indonesië (Traveling Through an Unfinished Past: The Old Indies in the New Indonesia). 1980. ISBN 9022840875
- Het zwarte leven: geschiedenis van onze mijnen en mijnwerkers (The Black Life: History of Our Mines and Miners). 1985. ISBN 9022837475
- De ABP-affaire: de journalistieke jacht op fraudes in de bouwwereld (with Hans Horsten; The ABP Affair: The Journalistic Hunt for Fraud in the Construction World). 1988. ISBN 9021837560
- Het CLB: 55 jaar Centraal Laboratorium van de Bloedtransfusiedienst van het Nederlandse Rode Kruis (The CLB: 55 Years of the Central Laboratory of the Blood Transfusion Service of the Dutch Red Cross). 2000. ISBN 9052670188
- Doemvlucht: de verzwegen geheimen van de Bijlmerramp (Flight of Doom: The Hidden Secrets of the Bijlmer Disaster). 2002. ISBN 9027479704
- Wachten op de nachtegaal: het verhaal van de Bijlmermeer (Waiting for the Nightingale: The Story of the Bijlmermeer). 2006. ISBN 9055157554
- De eer en de ellende: Nieuw–Guinea 1962 (The Honor and the Misery: New Guinea 1962). 2012. ISBN 9048490200
