= The Polish Bride =

1998 film

- Theatrical release poster
- Directed by: Karim Traïdia
- Written by: Kees van der Hulst
- Starring: Jaap Spijkers; Monic Hendrickx
- Cinematography: Jacques Laureys
- Edited by: Chris Teerink
- Music by: Fons Merkins
- Production companies: Motel Films; Ijswater Films; VPRO
- Distributed by: RCV Film Distribution
- Release date: 26 March 1998
- Country: Netherlands
- Language: Dutch

The Polish Bride (Dutch: De Poolse bruid) is a 1998 Dutch film directed by Karim Traïdia and written by Kees van der Hulst. The film was selected as the Dutch entry for the Best Foreign Language Film at the 71st Academy Awards, but was not accepted as a nominee.

== Cast ==
- Jaap Spijkers as Henk Woldring
- Monic Hendrickx as Anna Krzyzanowska
- Rudi Falkenhagen as the pimp
- Roef Ragas as the pimp's son
- Hakim Traidia as the mailman
- Soraya Traïdia as Krysztyna

== Awards and nominations ==
Golden Globe Awards

- Best Foreign Language Film (lost to Central Station)

International Film Festival of Rotterdam

- Awards: AUDIENCE AWARD

Netherlands Film Festival (Golden Calf)

- Best Actor (Spijkers – lost to Johan Leysen, Felice... Felice...)
- Best Actress (Hendrickx, won)
- Best Director (Karim Traïdia, won)

BERLIN

- Award: Best European film 1999 EUROPA AWARD

AFI American Film Institute, Los Angeles

- Award: Best European Entry

Selected for LA SEMAINE DE LA CRITIQUE Cannes 1998

- Award: GRAND RAIL D'OR

Best Film at Braunschweig Film Festival

- OSCARS 1999 Represented the Netherlands

== Australian adaptation ==
The 2007 Australian film Unfinished Sky, also starring Monic Hendrickx, is an adaptation of this film into an Australian context.

== See also ==
- List of submissions to the 71st Academy Awards for Best Foreign Language Film
- List of Dutch submissions for the Academy Award for Best Foreign Language Film
