= Siege of Haarlem =

Siege in the Northern Netherlands in 1572

Coordinates: 52°23′N 4°38′E

- Part of the Eighty Years' War
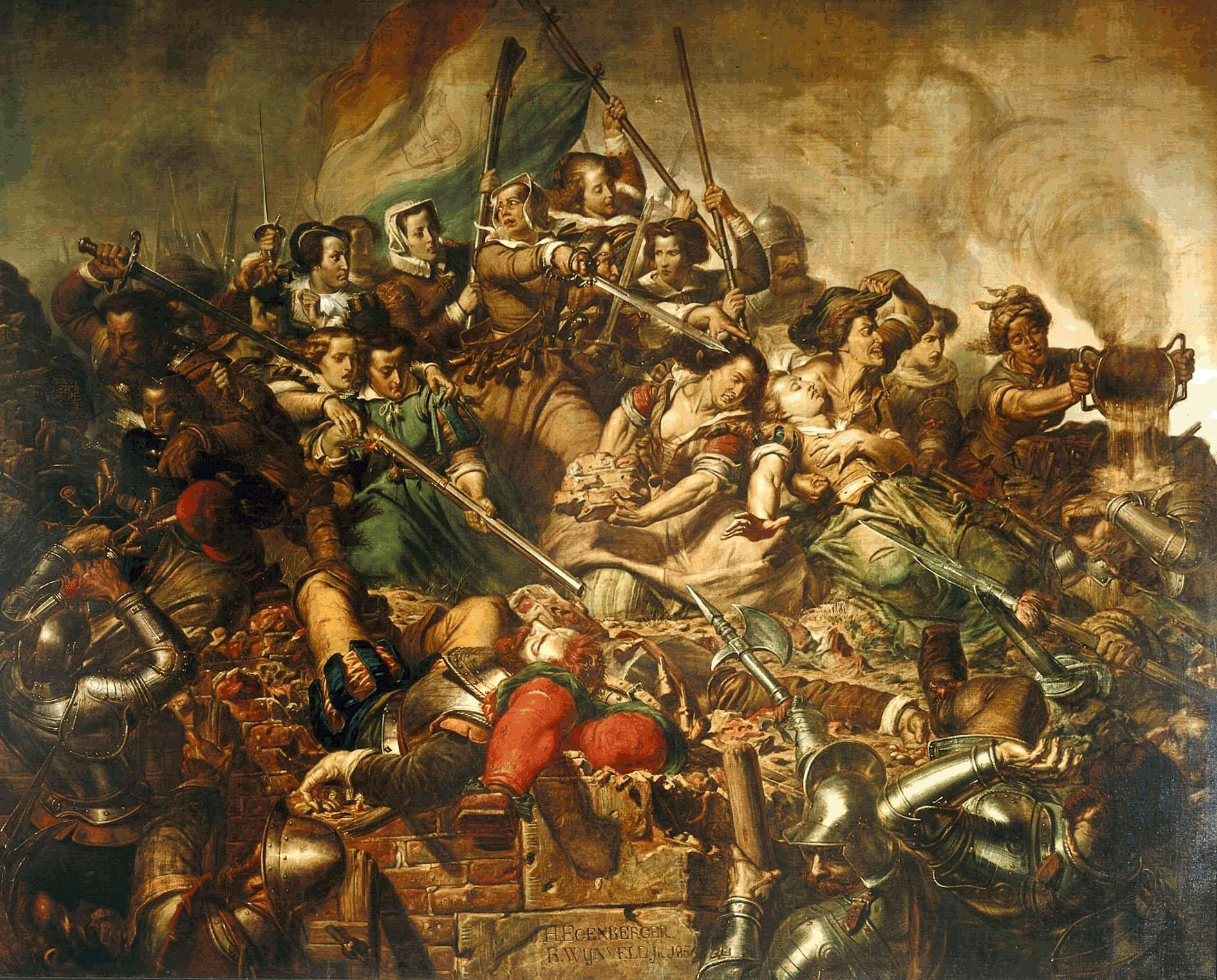
- Kenau Simons Hasselaer on the walls of Haarlem; Barend Wijnveld and Johannes Hinderikus Egenberger, 1854
Date	11 December 1572 – 13 July 1573
Location	Haarlem, County of Holland
Result	Spanish victory

Belligerents
Dutch rebels	Spain

Commanders and leaders
Wigbolt Ripperda (executed); William the Silent	(Spain) Fadrique Álvarez de Toledo

Strength
2,550 infantry and 225 cavalry (Haarlem); 5,000 soldiers (William the Silent)	17,000–18,000 troops

Casualties and losses
2,000 dead or wounded (Haarlem); 700 – 5,000 dead or wounded (William the Silent)	1,700 dead Thousands of casualties

The siege of Haarlem was an episode of the Eighty Years' War. From 11 December 1572 to 13 July 1573 an army of Philip II of Spain laid bloody siege to the city of Haarlem in the Netherlands, whose loyalties had begun wavering during the previous summer. After the naval battle of Haarlemmermeer and the defeat of a land relief force, the starving city surrendered and the garrison was massacred. The resistance nonetheless was taken as a heroic example by the Orangists at the sieges of Alkmaar and Leiden.

== Prelude ==
The city of Haarlem initially held a moderate view in the religious war that was going on in the Netherlands. It managed to escape from the Reformed iconoclasm in 1566 that affected other cities in the Netherlands. When the city of Brielle was conquered by the Geuzen revolutionary army on 1 April, Haarlem did not initially support the Geuzen. Most city administrators—unlike many citizens—did not favor open revolution against Philip II of Spain, who had inherited rule of the Netherlands from his father, the Holy Roman Emperor Charles V. However, after much political debate the city officially turned against Philip II on 4 July 1572.

The ruler of Spain was not pleased, and sent an army north under command of Don Fadrique (Don Frederick in Dutch), son of the Duke of Alva. On 17 November 1572 all citizens of the city of Zutphen were murdered by the Spanish army, and on 1 December the city of Naarden suffered the same fate.

The city administration of Haarlem sent a deputation of 4 people to Amsterdam to attempt to negotiate with Don Fadrique. The city's defenses were commanded by city-governor Wigbolt Ripperda, a commander put in charge by William the Silent, the Prince of Orange. He strongly disapproved of negotiating with the Spanish army, called the city guard together, and convinced them to stay loyal to the Prince of Orange. The city's administration was replaced with pro-Orange citizens. When the deputation came back from Amsterdam, they were convicted as traitors and sent to the Prince. The Sint-Bavokerk (Saint Bavo Church) was cleared of Roman Catholic symbols the same day.

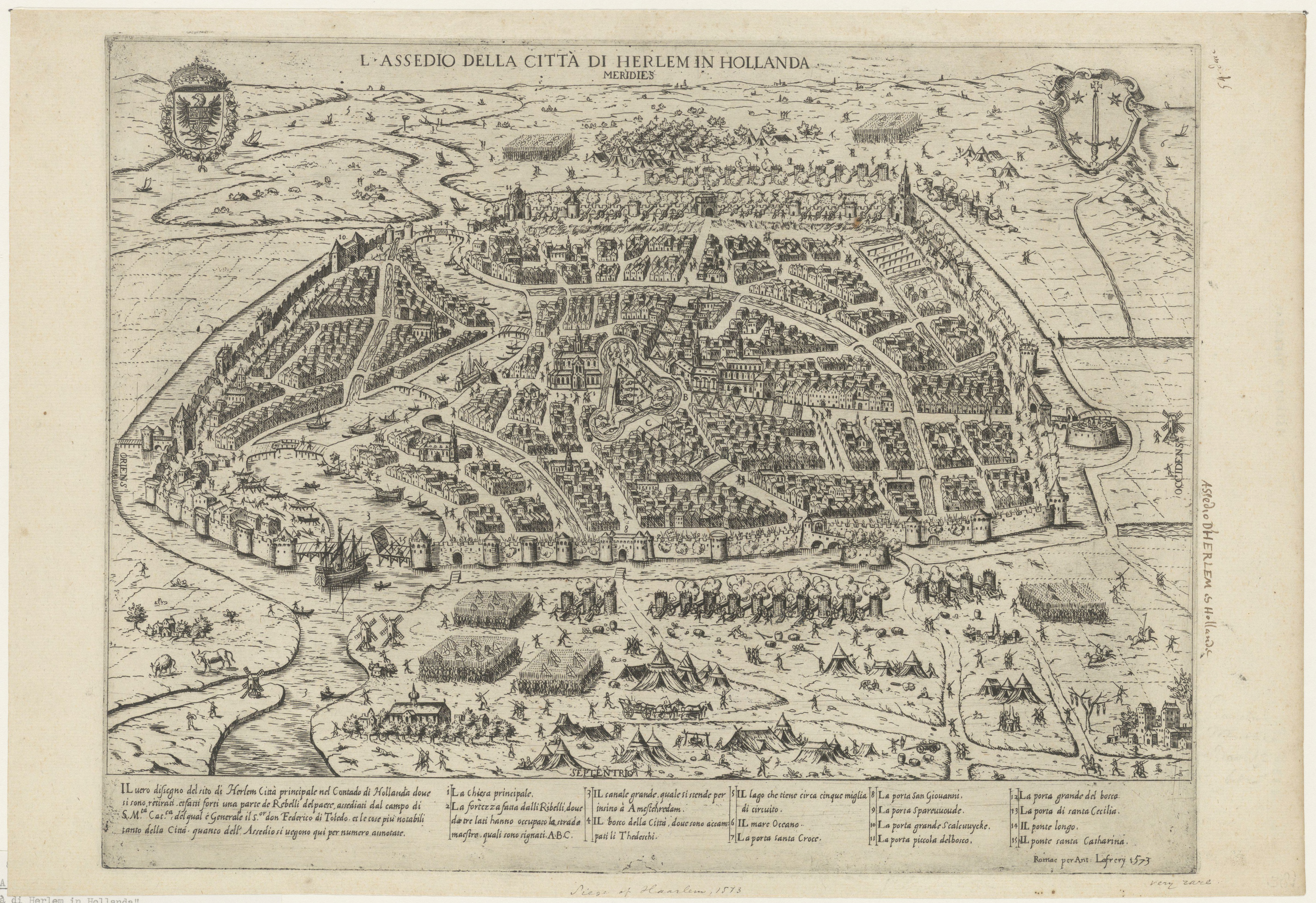
Bird's eye view of Haarlem and its surroundings during the Siege (south up), in a copper engraving published in 1573 by Antonio Lafreri. The Spanish troops and their camps are depicted in the foreground

== Under siege ==
Wigbolt Ripperda inspiring the citizens of Haarlem in the Doelen not to give in to the Spanish army.

On 11 December 1572 the Spanish army laid siege to Haarlem. The city was not very strong, militarily speaking. Although the city was completely surrounded by walls, they were not in good shape. The area around the city could not be inundated, and offered the enemy many places to set up camp. However, the existence of the Haarlemmermeer (a great lake) nearby made it difficult for the enemy to cut off the transportation of food into the city completely.

In the Middle Ages it was unusual to fight in the winter, but the city of Haarlem was crucial and Don Fadrique stayed and put the town under siege. During the first two months of the siege, the situation was in balance. The Spanish army dug two tunnels to reach the city walls and collapse them. The defenders made tunnels to blow up the Spanish tunnels. The situation became worse for Haarlem on 29 March 1573. The Amsterdam army, faithful to the Spanish king, occupied the Haarlemmermeer and effectively blocked Haarlem from the outside world. Hunger in the city grew, and the situation became so tense that on 27 May many (Spanish-loyal) prisoners were taken from the prison and murdered. On 19 December no less than 625 shots were fired at the defensive wall between the Janspoort and the Catherijnebridge. This forced the defenders to put up a completely new wall.

Two city gates, the Kruispoort and the Janspoort, collapsed from the fighting.

Kenau Simonsdochter Hasselaer, a widow of a shipwright, aided in restoring the city fortifications during the siege. Later this would develop into a historical myth that she personally fought and even led an army of 300 women into battle.

In the beginning of July William I of Orange put together an army of 5,000 soldiers near Leiden, to rescue Haarlem. However, the Spanish trapped them at the Manpad and defeated the army.

== Surrender ==
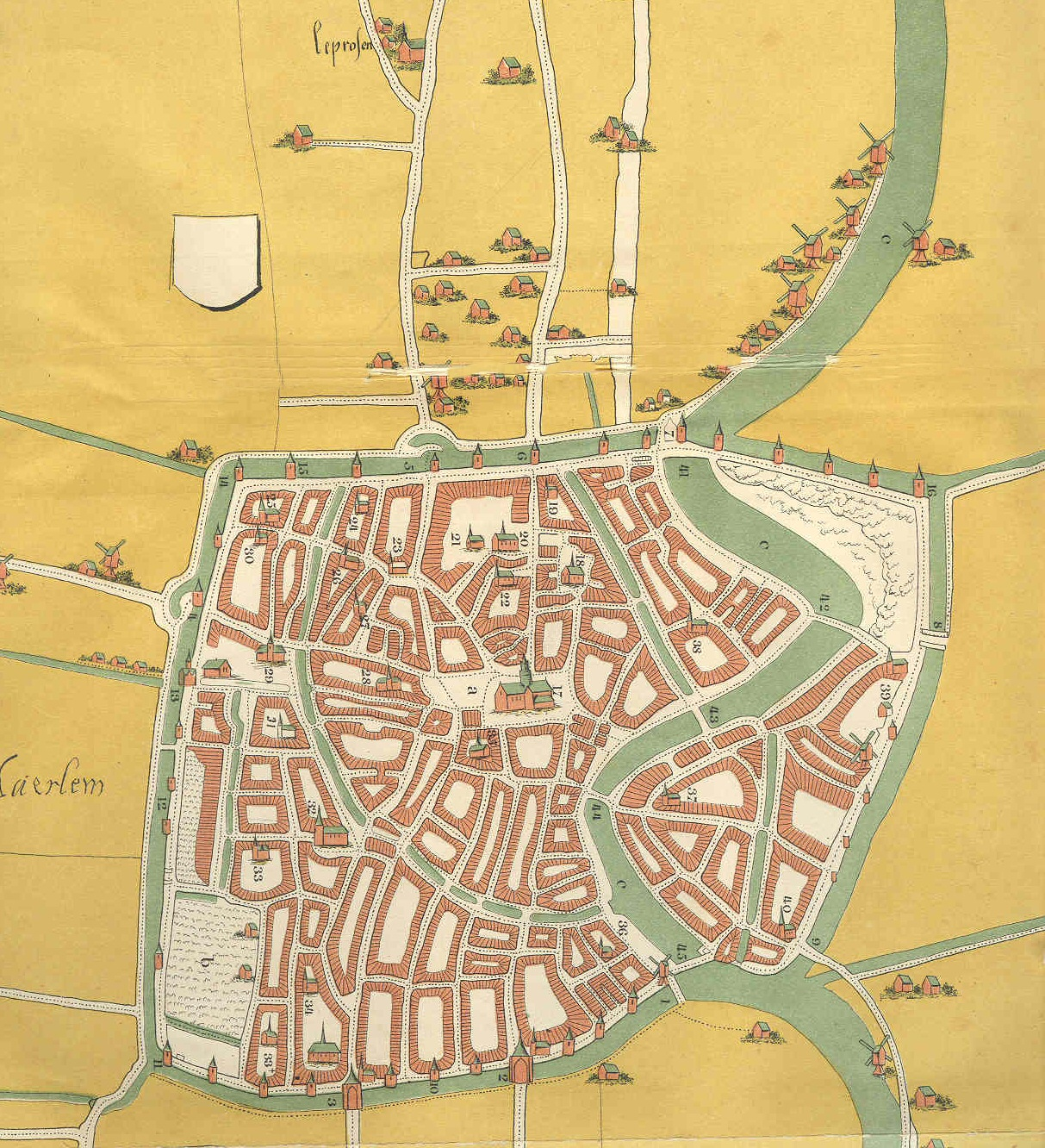
City map of Haarlem around 1550. The city is completely surrounded by a city wall and defensive canal.

In the early days of the battle, the Spanish army tried an assault of the city walls, but this attempt to quickly conquer the city failed due to the insufficient preparation by the Spanish army, which had not expected much resistance. This initial victory gave the defenders' morale a big boost.

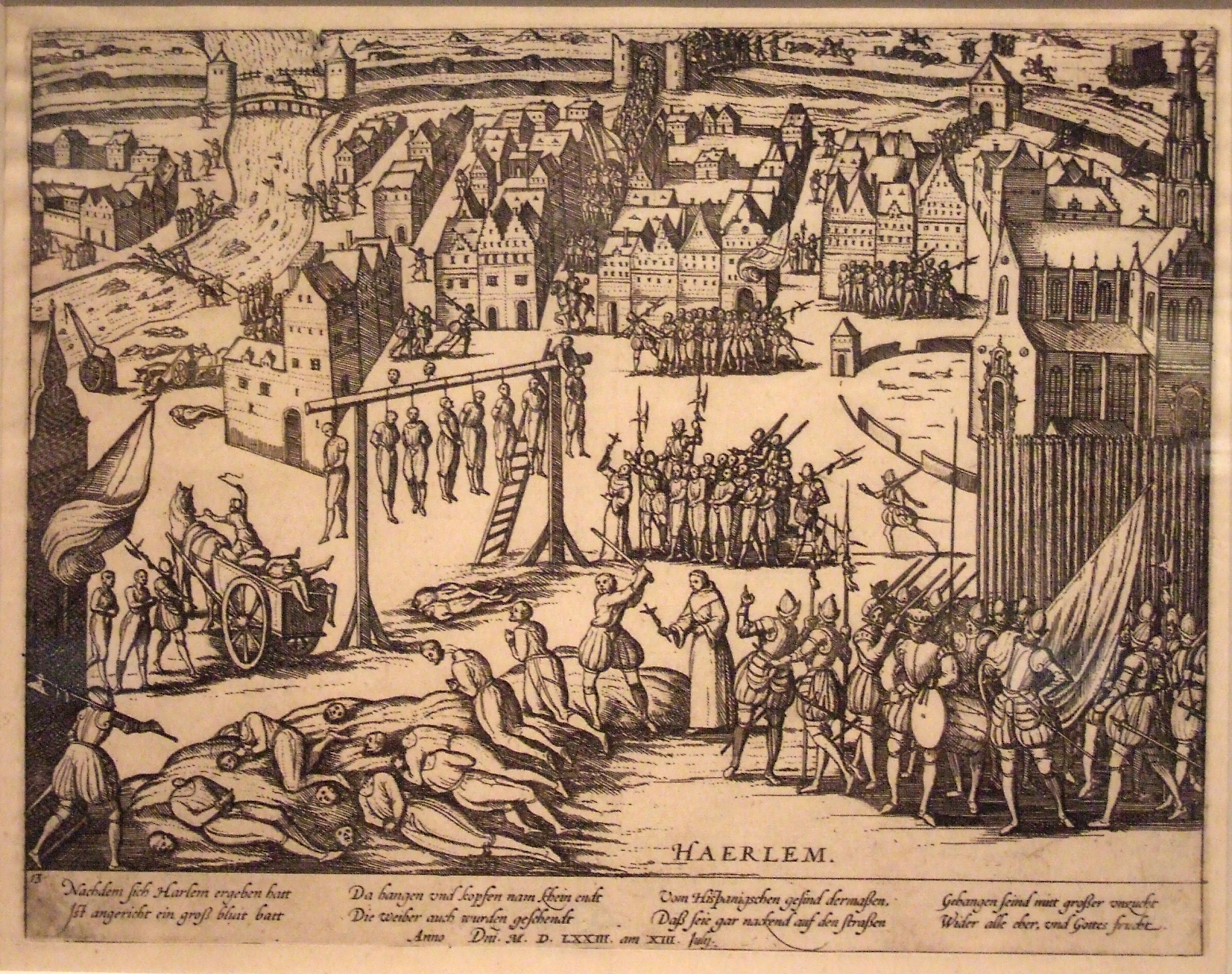
"Beleg van Haarlem" a Dutch propaganda engraving of 1573 shows mass hangings and beheadings, and cartloads of bodies flung in the river.

After seven months the city surrendered on 13 July 1573. Usually, after such a siege, there would be a period of time that the soldiers of the victorious army could pillage the city, but the citizens were allowed to buy themselves and the city free for 240,000 guilders.

The written assurances that had been given to the city were respected, but the whole garrison (which included many English, French Huguenots, and Germans) was executed with the exception of the Germans. Forty burghers considered guilty of sedition were executed as well; the besiegers having run out of ammunition, many of them were drowned in the Spaarne river. While most citizens were allowed to leave, 1,500 of the city’s defenders were either beheaded or tied back-to-back in a pair and thrown into the river. Governor Ripperda and his lieutenant were beheaded. Don Fadrique thanked God for his victory in the Sint-Bavokerk. The city would have to host a Spanish garrison.

== Aftermath ==
Although ultimately the city could not be kept for the Prince of Orange, the siege showed other cities that the Spanish army was not invincible. This idea, and the great losses suffered by the Spanish army (maybe 10,000 men), helped the cities of Leiden and Alkmaar in their sieges. The latter city would later defeat the Spanish army, a major breakthrough in the Dutch Revolt. In the Sint-Bavo church the following words can still be read:

In dees grote nood, in ons uutereste ellent

Gaven wij de stadt op door hongers verbant
Niet dat hij se in creegh met stormender hant.

In this great need, in our uttermost misery,
we gave up the city, forced by hunger,

not that he took her by storm.

The Army of Flanders was subsequently plagued by serious mutinies.

== Literature and film ==
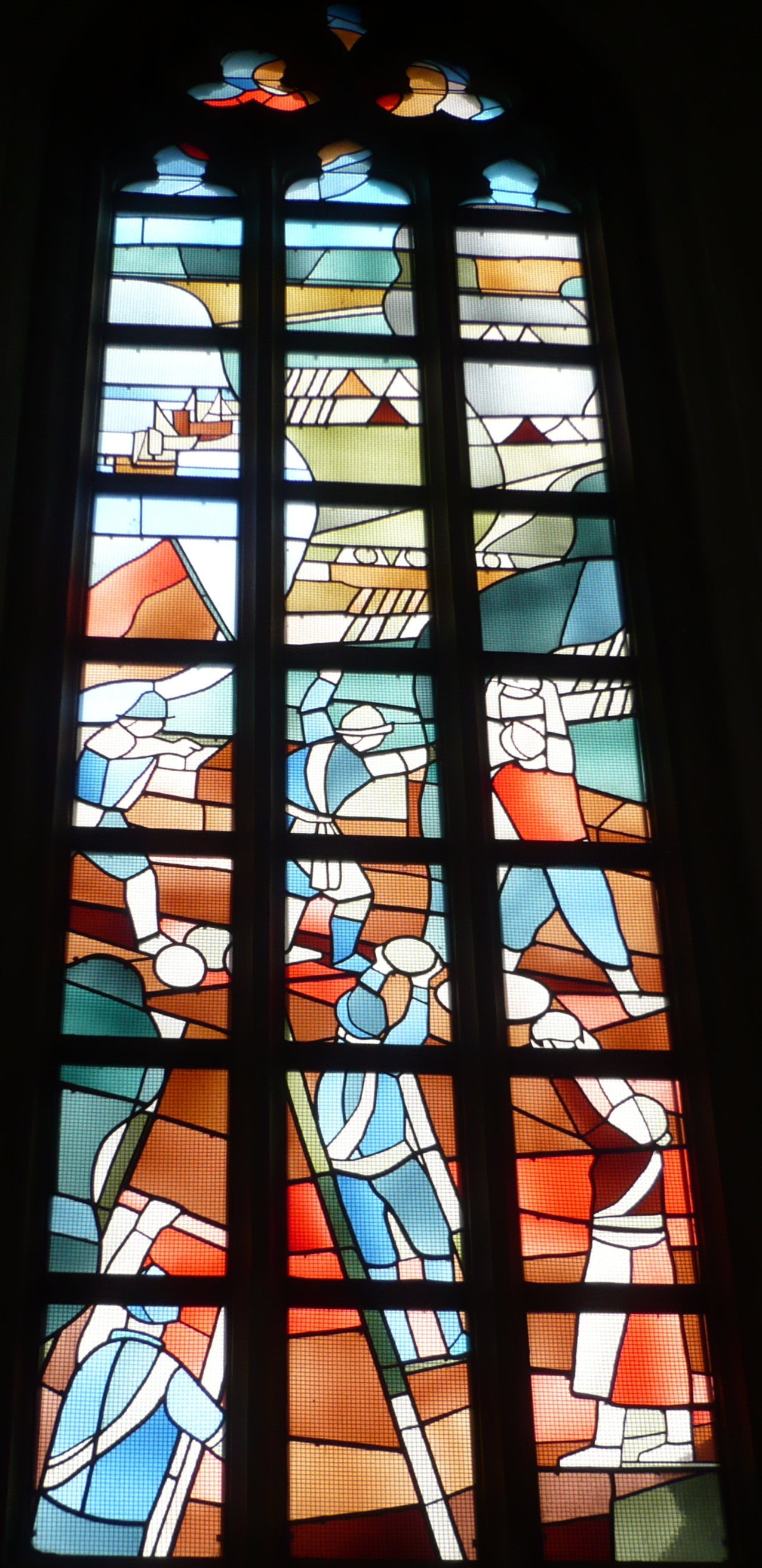
Stained glass window in St.-Bavokerk by Friso ten Holt (1980), commemorating the siege of Haarlem

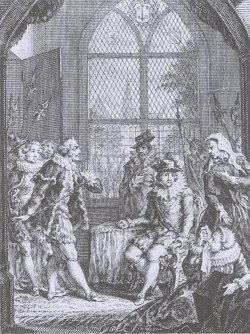
Scene of a play by Juliana de Lannoy, published in 1770. The moment when Amelia, Kenau's daughter, mourns for her husband Wigbolt Ripperda (in coffin) while Kenau who is angry, scolds the Duke of Alba, who has entered the room to take Pieter Hasselaer (seated) into custody.

Some Dutch cities celebrate their victory over the Spanish with a yearly celebration of independence, such as Alkmaar since 8 October 1573 and Leiden since 2–3 October 1574. Haarlem did not win on 13 July 1573, however, and this has made independence celebrations somewhat problematic. The siege of Haarlem has been made into 3 plays; most notably by Juliana de Lannoy in 1770.

The 2014 Dutch film Kenau depicts the siege, enhancing the legendary acts of the women defending the city.
