= Amsterdamse Poort, Haarlem =

Coordinates: 52°22′50″N 4°38′48″E

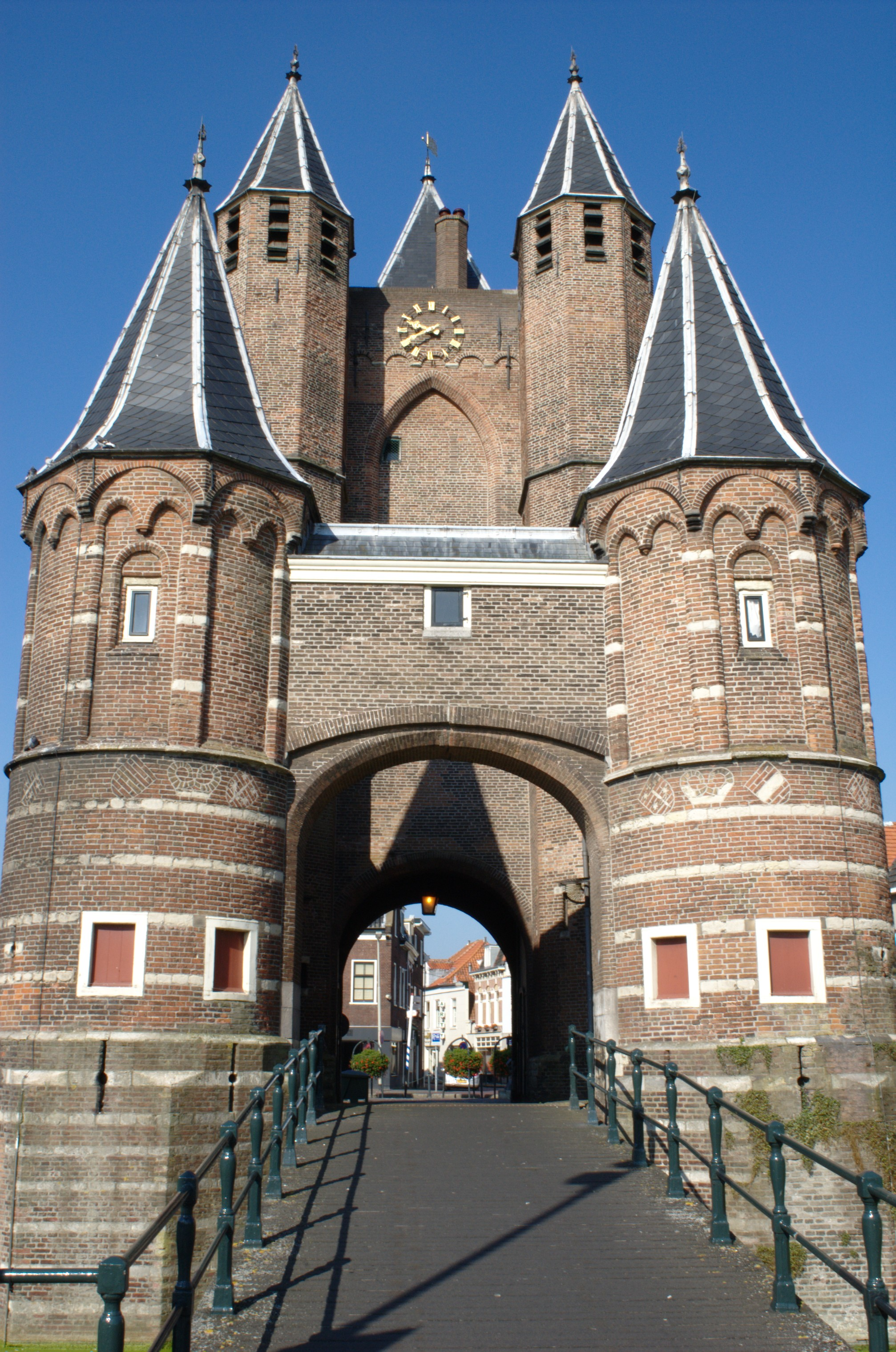
The Amsterdamse Poort facing the canal to Amsterdam, and before 1631 known as the Spaarnwouder Poort because it was built to face the road to Spaarnwoude.

The Amsterdamse Poort is an old city gate of Haarlem, Netherlands. It is located at the end of the old route from Amsterdam to Haarlem and the only gate left from the original twelve city gates.

== History ==
It was created in 1355 and is the only remaining city gate from the defenses of Haarlem. Until the 17th century it was the city gate used for traffic by land eastwards towards Spaarnwoude over the Laeghe weg (now Oude weg). In 1631 the Haarlemmertrekvaart was dug, which shortened the waterway from Haarlem to Amsterdam considerably.

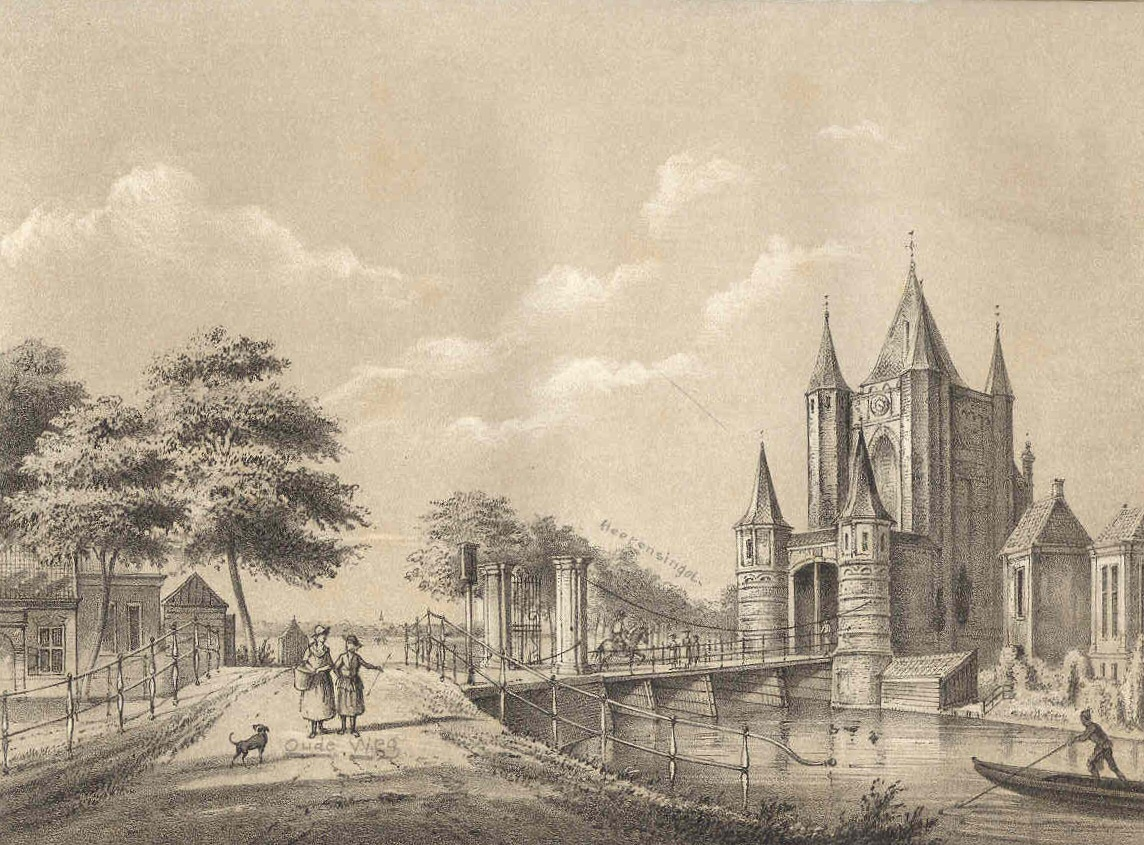
Picture of the Amsterdamse Poort in the 17th century. On a Haarlem map from 1646 it was still listed as Sparwouwer Poort.

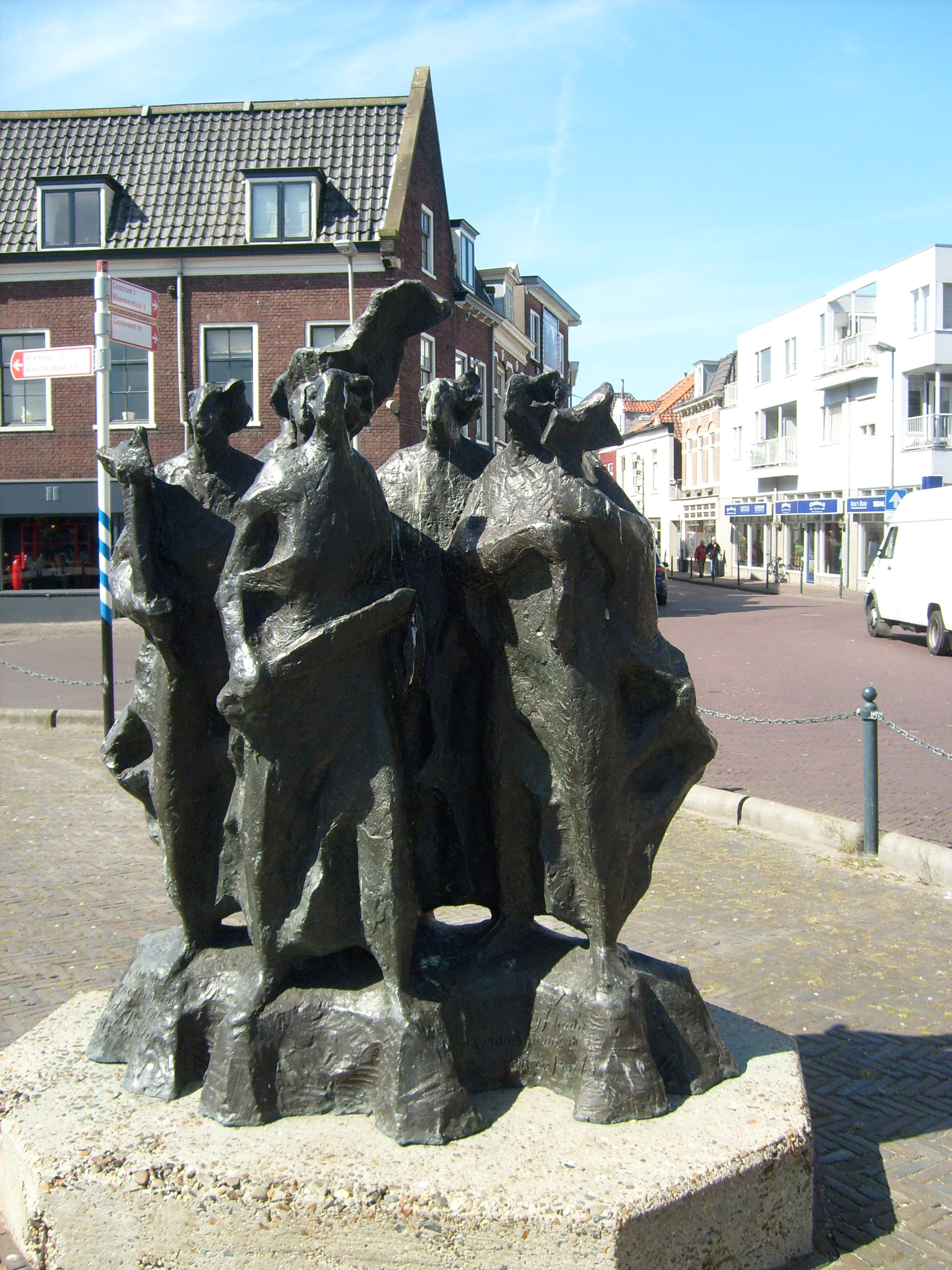
Sculpture in front of the gate on the Haarlem side (Spaarnwouderstraat) depicting Kenau Simonsdochter Hasselaer

This gate, for those travelling by land, was called the Spaarnwouderpoort. With the new canal and its towpath, the trip was so short, it became much more popular, since it was now possible to travel back and forth to Amsterdam on the same day. Thus the name of the gate changed to Amsterdamse Poort.

In 1865 the city government wanted to demolish the gate. A speedy procedure to put down the gate was requested, as the gate was in pretty bad shape and was blocking the construction of a new bridge on the location just in front of the gate. However, there was not enough money at the moment to construct a new bridge, so the city council agreed to provide funds for a short-term renovation of the gate to make sure it would stay up for two or three more years.

In 1867 the Papentoren, a tower, was demolished, and the munition that had been stored there needed a storage space. A room in the Amsterdamse Poort was suited for that and the munition was stored. In 1869 the bridge in front of the gate was finally reconstructed. In 1874 most of the (explosive) munition was taken outside the city.

In 1889 a small renovation was planned, with a budget of 1,490 guilders. The city architect, J. Leijh, started the project, which later required an extra 775 guilders.

In the 1960s the gate was declared a national monument. In 1985 a complete renovation of the gate took place.
