= Jeroen Willems =

Dutch actor (1962–2012)

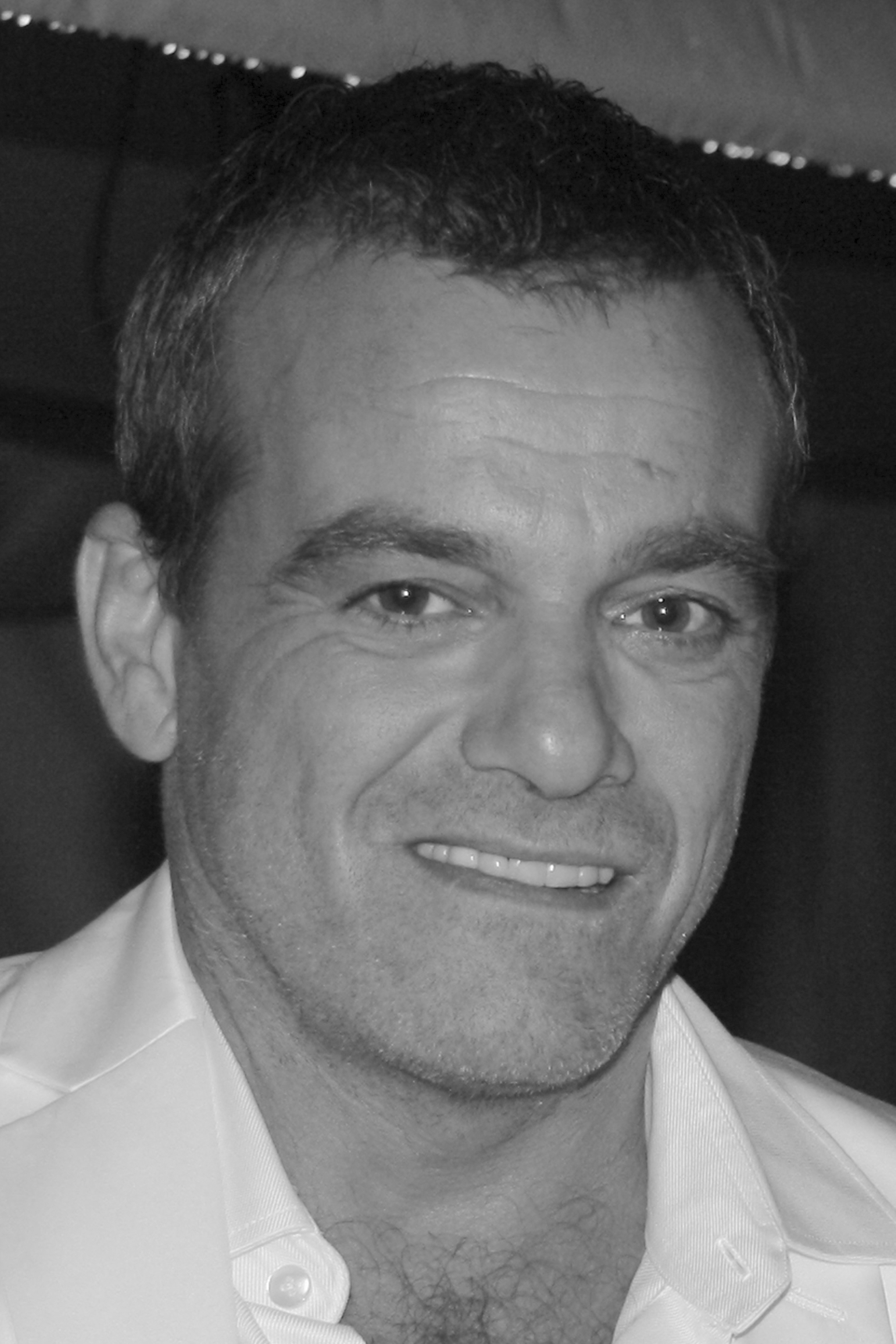
- Willems in 2012
- Born: 15 November 1962; Maastricht, Netherlands
- Died: 3 December 2012 (aged 50); Amsterdam, Netherlands
- Occupations: Actor, singer
- Years active: 1991–2012
- Partner: Marcel Musters

Jeroen Willems (Dutch pronunciation: [jəˈruɱ ˈʋɪləms]; 15 November 1962 – 3 December 2012) was a Dutch Golden Calf and Louis d'Or winning film, TV, and stage actor and singer.

== Early life ==
Willems was born on 15 November 1962 in Maastricht, the third child of a drama teacher and an elocutionist. Soon afterwards, the family moved to Heerlen. Willems' father died in 1978, age 52, when Jeroen was 15 years old. Willems attended the Maastricht Academy of Dramatic Arts.

== Career ==
Willems was attached to theatrical company Theatergroep Hollandia. He could be seen in La Musica (1991), the solo show Twee stemmen (from 1997 on) and La Musica Twee (2003). He also played with other companies, including Het Zuidelijk Toneel/Hollandia, het Nationale Toneel, and the Flemish company De Tijd. With Oostpool, he played in the musical stage production Brel, de zoete oorlog. In the show, he also sang a couple of songs of Jacques Brel, translated to Dutch. In April 2010 he had the leading role in a performance of Louis Andriessen's opera La Commedia at Carnegie Hall in New York.

He also could be seen in many film and television productions. In 1991, he played David Grobben in the TV series Bij nader inzien, based on the novel of J.J. Voskuil. Other TV series include Tijd van leven (1996), Wij, Alexander (1998), as Dutch cabaret star Wim Sonneveld in Bij ons in de Jordaan (2000), Bellicher (2010), and Lijn 32 (2012). In 2007, he had the leading role in Stellenbosch), a drama series about a South African wineyard at the end of the apartheid. In 2010, he played King William II in the AVRO TV series De Troon.

Film roles include Nynke (2001) as Dutch socialist Pieter Jelles Troelstra, De passievrucht (2003), Ocean's Twelve (2004), Simon (2004), Summer Heat (2008), Stricken (2009), and as Prince Claus in Majesteit (2010). In 2012, he played the role of criminal Mirko Narain in the TV film Cop vs Killer.

Two TV series will be released posthumously. In January 2013, the VPRO broadcast the TV series De ontmaskering van de Vastgoedfraude, in which Willems has the leading part. Three movies were released in 2013. Willems appeared in Tula: The Revolt, and Boven is het Stil. De wederopstanding van een klootzak opened the 2013 International Film Festival Rotterdam.

== Death ==
On 3 December 2012, Willems became unwell during the rehearsals for a gala event on the occasion of the 125th anniversary of Royal Theatre Carré in Amsterdam, later that evening. The same day, he died of the effects of congestive heart failure in the Onze Lieve Vrouwe Gasthuis hospital. The event, which would have been attended by princess Beatrix, was canceled in connection with his death.

== Awards and nominations ==
Willems was the recipient of the 1994 Mary Dresselhuys Prijs for best Dutch stage actor. In 2004 he was awarded the Louis d'Or, the most prestigious Dutch stage award, for his roles in La Musica Twee and as Jacques Brel in Brel, de zoete oorlog with theatrical company Oostpool.

In 1999, he was nominated for the Golden Calf for best actor for his role in the short film Zaanse Nachten (1998). In 2001 he was nominated a second time for his role as Pieter Jelles Troelstra in Nynke. In 2010, he won the Golden Calf for best actor in a supporting role as Prince Claus in Majesteit. In 2012, he received the Golden Calf for best actor in a leading role for the TV film Cop vs Killer.

In 2012, he was guest of honor at the Dutch Film Festival in Utrecht.

== Private life ==
Willems was openly gay and he had a relationship with the actor Marcel Musters.
