= The Promise of Pisa =

2019 film

- Film poster
- Dutch: De Belofte van Pisa
- Directed by: Norbert ter Hall
- Written by: Robert Alberdingk Thijm
- Based on: De belofte van Pisa by Mano Bouzamour
- Produced by: Rolf Koot
- Cinematography: Richard van Oosterhout
- Release date: 10 October 2019 (Netherlands)
- Country: Netherlands
- Language: Dutch

The Promise of Pisa (Dutch: De Belofte van Pisa) is a 2019 Dutch drama film directed by Norbert ter Hall. The film is based on the autobiographical novel by Mano Bouzamour.

== Plot summary & cast ==
Plot summary

Sam Zafar, called Samir at home, grows up in the Amsterdam Noord as the son of illiterate, poorly integrated Moroccan parents. His brother is involved with serious crime, his sisters work behind the cash register and his friends hang around aimlessly on the streets. Sam, however, is determined to get his diploma at the white gymnasium in posh Amsterdam-Zuid and throw himself into his great love of classical piano music.

Cast

- Shahine El-Hamus as Samir (Sam)
- Olivia Lonsdale as Annelies Salomons
- Carly Wijs as Marjolein Salomon
- Yorick van Wageningen as Pluizebol
- Monic Hendrickx as Iris Versluys
- Thor Braun as IJsbrand Versluys
- Nora El Koussour as Mina Zafar
- Nadia Abdelouafi as Schoonmaakster

== Awards ==
The film won the award for Best Film at the Breaking TV Film Festival in London, United Kingdom.

Shahine El-Hamus won the Golden Calf for Best Actor award at the 2020 Netherlands Film Festival for his role in the film. Rui Reis Maia, Jasper Boeke and Diederik Rijpstra won the Golden Calf for Best Music award for the music of the film.

== Production ==
In August 2015, it was announced that Norbert ter Hall and Robert Alberdingk Thijm were going to adapt Mano Bouzamour's book to film.

In May 2018, it was announced that Yorick van Wageningen was added to the cast. In September 2018, it was announced that Shahine El-Hamus, Olivia Lonsdale, Nora El Koussour and Thor Braun were added to the cast. Principal photography began in September 2018 and concluded in May 2019. In May 2019, it was announced that Monic Hendrickx also plays a role in the film.
