= Yorick van Wageningen =

Dutch actor

- Born: 16 April 1964 (age 62); Baarn, Utrecht, Netherlands
- Occupation: Actor
- Years active: 1989 – present

Yorick van Wageningen (born 16 April 1964) is a Dutch actor who has performed in Dutch and American films, including The Chronicles of Riddick and the 2011 remake of The Girl with the Dragon Tattoo.

== Life and career ==
Van Wageningen was born in Baarn. After acting in several Dutch plays, movies, and television series, van Wageningen was asked to come to Hollywood to appear in Steven Spielberg's Minority Report. Due to problems with his visa, he was unable to work on that movie, but thereafter acted in a number of American movies, achieving a breakthrough with his role in The Chronicles of Riddick.

Back in the Netherlands, he starred in Winter in Wartime, based on a Dutch novel about World War II.

In 2011, he appeared in The Girl with the Dragon Tattoo along with Daniel Craig, in the role of Nils Bjurman, the sexually abusive guardian of Lisbeth Salander (Rooney Mara). He garnered praise in the Dutch press for his portrayal of Ronnie, an Amsterdam gangster who experiences a spiritual resurrection after miraculously surviving an assassination attempt, in the 2013 film De wederopstanding van een klootzak.

In 2017, Van Wageningen was reported to be filming one of his last major roles, a remake of 1973's Papillon, and in pre-production for Simon de Waal's The Fear of God, before shifting his attention to "improving the position of creators in the Netherlands".

In 2019, he appeared in the film, The Promise of Pisa as Pluizebol.

== Filmography ==
=== Film ===
Year	Title	Role	Notes
1989	Wilde Harten	Handlanger	
1993	Angie	Kick	
1998	ledereen kent Suus		Short film
2000	Total Loss	Reinier Kloprogge	
2001	Soul Assassin	Local Inspector	
2001	Me and Morrison	Jan	
2002	Deserter	Schreiber	
2003	The Tulse Luper Suitcases, Part 1: The Moab Story	Julian Lephrenic	
2003	The Tulse Luper Suitcases: Antwerp	Julian Lephrenic	
2003	Beyond Borders	Kurt Steiger	
2004	The Chronicles of Riddick	The Guv	
2005	Tulse Luper Suitcase: A Life in Suitcases	Julian Lephrenic	
2005	The New World	Captain Argall	
2006	Night Run		Uncredited
2007	The Blue Hour	Avo	
2008	Winter in Wartime	Uncle Ben	
2010	The Way	Joost	
2011	U & Eye	Upholsterer	Short film
2011	The Girl with the Dragon Tattoo	Nils Bjurman	
2013	De wederopstanding van een klootzak	Ronnie	
2013	47 Ronin	Kapitan	
2014	Last Summer	Alex	
2015	Blackhat	Sadak	
2015	Broker	Our Man	Short film
2017	Storm: Letters van Vuur	Klaas	
2017	Final Review	Rick Garret	Short film
2017	Papillon	Warden Barrot	
2019	Escape Room	Games Master WooTan Yu	
2019	De Belofte van Pisa	Pluizebol	
2021	Escape Room: Tournament of Champions	Flashback - Games Master WooTan Yu	
2021	The Judgement	Michael de Jong	Post-production
TBA	The Fear of God	Robert	Pre-production
TBA	Judy	Lieutenant Albers	Pre-production

=== Television ===
Year	Title	Role	Notes
1989-1990	Spijkerhoek	Ruud de Lange	Recurring role; 9 episodes
1990	Goede tijden, slechte tijden	Ben Veerman	Recurring role; 14 episodes
1991-1992	Vrienden voor het leven	Frank / Gerard	Guest role; 2 episodes
1993	Oppassen!!!	Robbie de Wit	Episode: "'it Reclamespotje"
1995	20 Plus	Julian	Unaired television series
1996	Zonder Ernst		Episode: "Niemendalletjes"
1997	12 steden, 13 ongelukken	David Zomer	Episode: "Geen geheimen (Bathmen)"
1998	Frenchman's Creek	Van Basten	Television film
2006	The Commander: Blacklight	Van Hauten	Television film
2007	The Commander: The Fraudster	Van Hauten	Television film
2009	Flow	Lucien Kortrijk	Episode: "Aflevering 5"
2010	De Troon	Willem I	Television mini-series
2020	The Letter for the King	King Favian	Netflix original series
2022	Rampvlucht	Pierre Heijboer	KRO-NCRV original series
2024	Mayor of Kingstown	Konstantin Noskov	9 episodes

== Awards and nominations ==
Year	Award	Category	Nominated work	Result	Source
2009	Rembrandt Award	Best Dutch Actor	Winter in Wartime	Nominated	
2013	Fantastic Film Fest Next Wave Spotlight	Best Actor	The Resurrection of a Bastard	Won	
