= Mano Bouzamour =

Dutch novelist and columnist

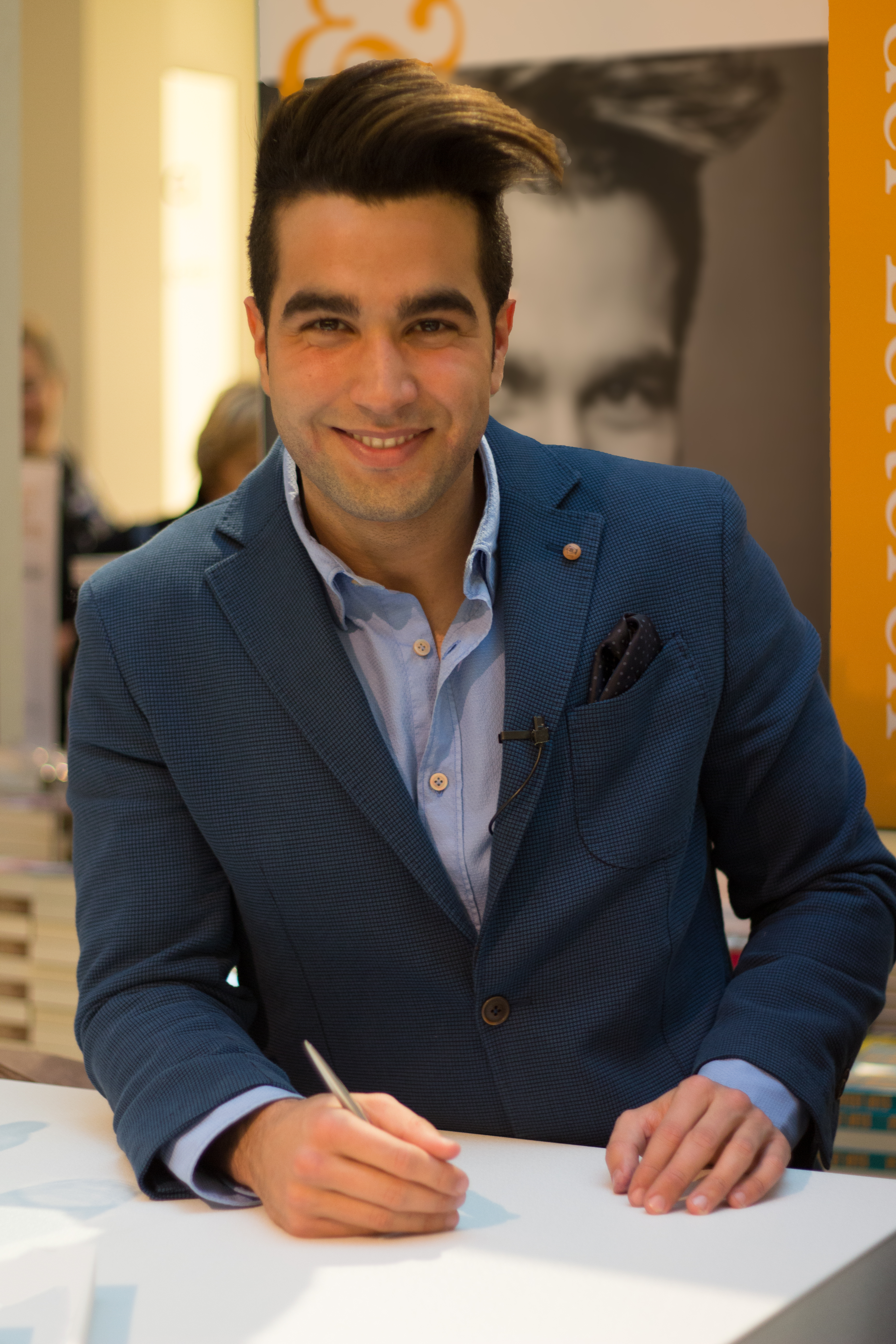
Mano Bouzamour (2015).

Mano Bouzamour (born 1991 in Amsterdam) is a Dutch novelist and columnist. He scored a stunning success with his first novel, De belofte van Pisa (The Promise of Pisa), in which he described his childhood and youth as the son of immigrants in the Netherlands.

== Life and work ==
Bouzamour grew up in an immigrant family in the Amsterdam neighborhood of De Pijp. His parents originate from Morocco. He has three sisters and three brothers. His high school was the Reformed Lyceum South. In 2013, when his first novel was published, he worked in a sushi bar and lived together with his girlfriend and his older brother. He intended to study history and continue writing. His literary idoles are American writers such as J.D. Salinger, Stephen King and David Benioff. He admitted that he stole The Catcher in the Rye by Salinger from a Dutch library.

In 2013, he debuted with his novel The Promise of Pisa. The novel is based on how Bouzamour himself as a teenager grew up in an immigrant neighborhood surrounding De Pijp. In the book, he describes his illiterate and narrow-minded parents, being beaten in the Koran school, hanging around in youth clubs and visiting luxurious homes of classmates. In the morning the protagonist Samir played classical music on a stolen concert piano, and on Fridays, during prayers in the mosque, he struggled with fantasies of blonde and nude female devils, but his happiest hours were at night roaring through Amsterdam with his beloved brother on the Vespa. While his brother had to serve a six-year-sentence for fraud and theft Sam promised and provided — against all odds — the degree of an elite high school.

The book caused an outcry within the Moroccan community as it was not conceived as fiction, but as autobiography. The author was confronted with hatred and, as he called it, ″mass hysteria″, even from relatives and friends. But the Dutch public and the international press loved the book, it became the best-selling debut novel of 2014 in the Netherlands. The film, theater and radio play rights were sold, and publications in the German language and in Latin America were prepared. Bouzamour defended his novel fiercely: "Why should my protagonist not be allowed to make jokes about the sweaty feet of his mother?" The book is now on the reading list of some secondary schools. In 2016, the book was published by the prestigious Residenz Verlag in Austria — with the German title Samir, genannt Sam (Samir, called Sam). Also was published by the independent publisher house Rey Naranjo in Spanish.

In October 2019, the film adaptation of the book premiered: The Promise of Pisa.

As a columnist, he writes for Het Parool, Elle and Cosmopolitan.
