= Wigbolt Ripperda =

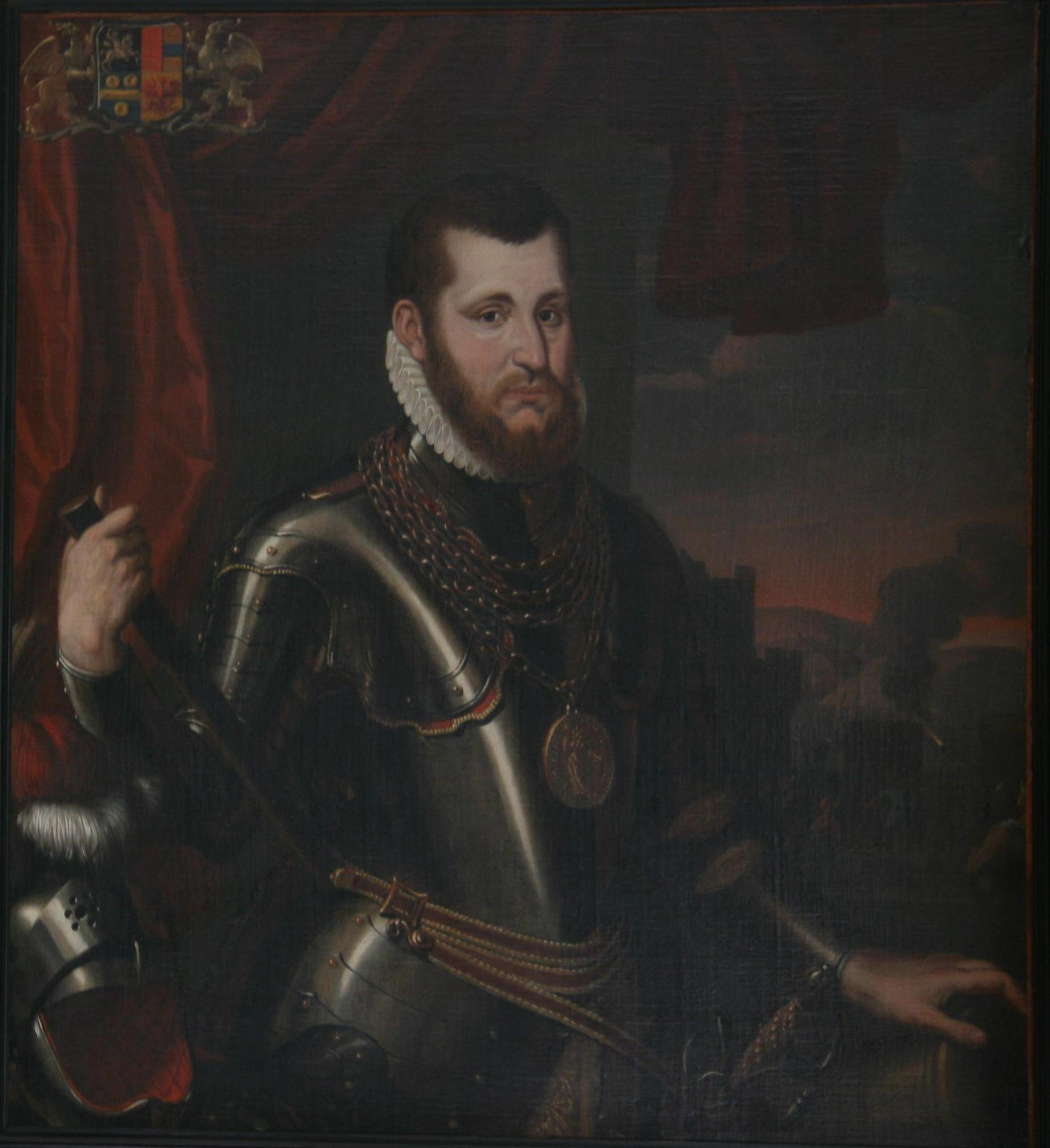
Portrait of Wigbolt Ripperda by Herman Collenius

Wigbolt Ripperda inspiring the citizens of Haarlem in the Doelen not to give in to the Spanish army.

Wigbolt, Baron Ripperda (1535? – 16 July 1573) was the city governor of Haarlem when the city was under siege by the Spanish army in the Eighty Years' War.

== Biography ==
Wigbolt Ripperda was born in Winsum. He was the son of Baron Focko Ripperda van Winsum and Baroness Clara van Ewsum. The Ripperda family was one of the oldest and most powerful noble families in the Ommelanden, today known as the province of Groningen in the Netherlands. Focko and Clara Ripperda had four sons: Peter, Asinge, Onno, Wigbolt and Johanna, a daughter.

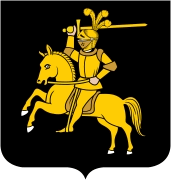
Coat of arms

Together with his brother Onno, Wigbolt studied Latin and other languages in Geneva and Orléans. In Geneva, where Calvin was preaching, he came into contact with Protestantism, the new religion that inspired the Dutch Revolt. He became a strong believer in Protestantism.

When he returned to Winsum, he was involved in the wave of iconoclasm in the Netherlands (the Beeldenstorm). On 14 September 1566, Wigbolt and his brothers, as well as two other men, broke into the church in Winsum and destroyed the statues of saints and the altar.

Wigbolt joined the army of the Prince of Orange, the geuzen, and became hopman. Until August 1572, he was commander of the guard of William van der Marck, Lord of Lumey, who brought him to the city of Haarlem. He became governor of Haarlem after that.

On 4 December, a week before the siege started, Ripperda 'cleaned' the Sint-Bavokerk of all Catholic symbols.

== Siege of Haarlem ==
When it became clear that a large Spanish army under command of Don Fadrique was approaching the city, he inspired the citizens and municipality of Haarlem not to give in to the demands of the Spanish king, but to fight and defend the city.

The city stayed loyal to the Prince of Orange and resisted the Spanish army in a 7-months siege. After this long and bitter siege, the city had to surrender because of a lack of food and supplies. On 12 July 1573, the city officially surrendered to Don Fadrique.

== Death ==
Ripperda was captured together with other soldiers and imprisoned in a church in Haarlem. On 16 July at 11.00 o'clock, he was transferred to the Grote Markt, where he was beheaded. His brother, Asinge, who was also in the city, was smuggled out of the city by a Spaniard.

Although the city was defeated, the siege of Haarlem had been so exhausting for the Spanish army that in the Siege of Alkmaar they were defeated.

His brother Onno died on 17 June 1580.

A number of streets and buildings in Haarlem and Winsum are named after Ripperda.

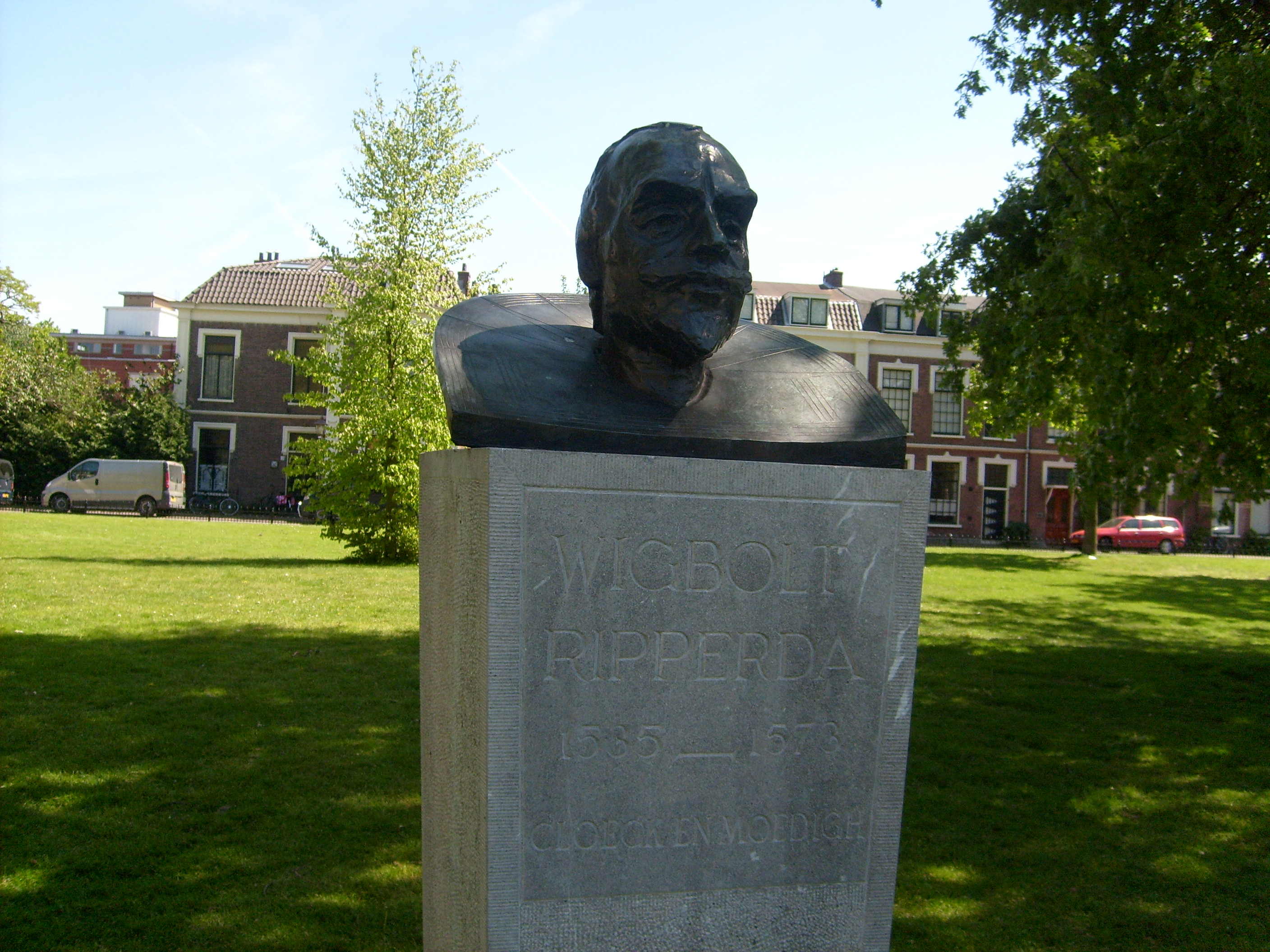
Bust of Ripperda in the park named after him in Haarlem

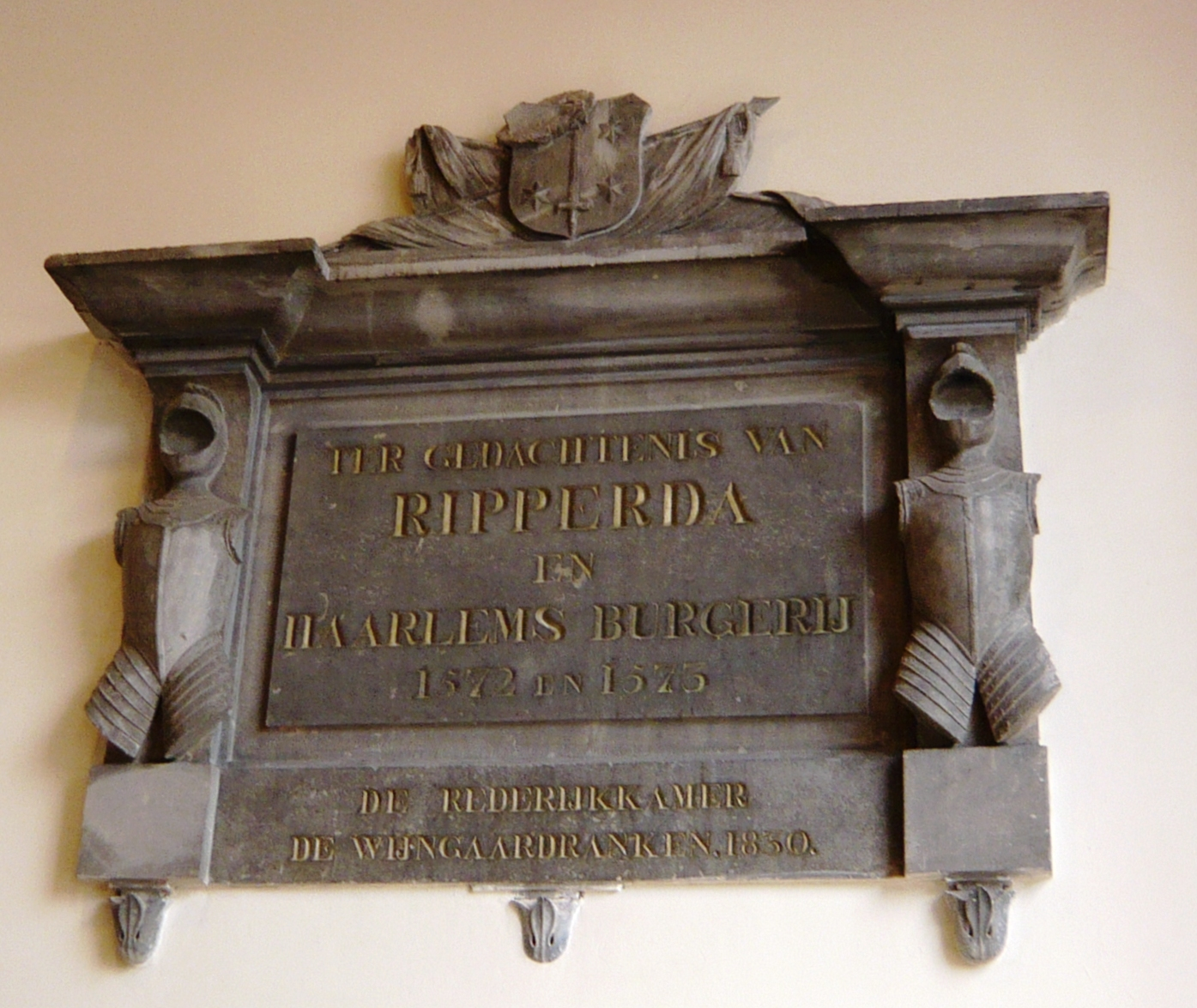
Memorial plaque for Wigbolt Ripperda in the meeting hall of the Haarlem schutterij

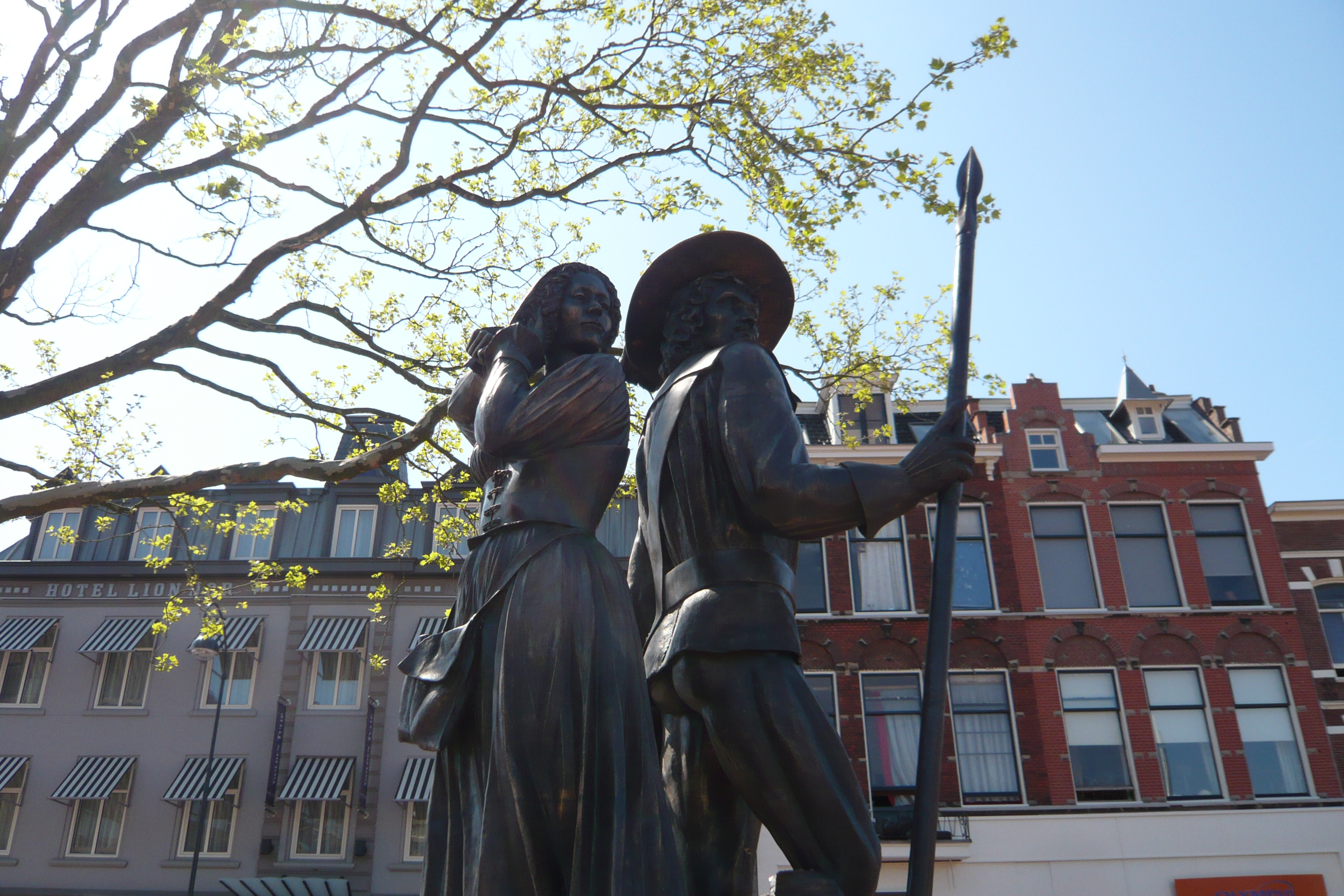
Statue of Wigbolt Ripperda with Kenau Simonsdochter Hasselaer on the Stationsplein Haarlem, by sculptor Graziella Curreli
