= Monic Hendrickx =

Dutch actress (born 1966)

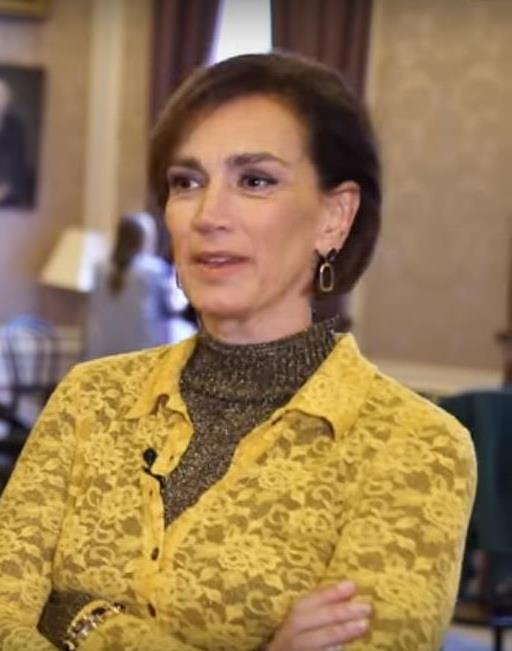
- Born: 3 December 1966 (age 59); Sint Anthonis, Netherlands
- Occupation: Actress
- Years active: 1998–present

Monic Hendrickx (born 3 December 1966 in Sint Anthonis) is a Dutch actress. She has won several awards during her career including four Golden Calf awards for Best Actress at the Nederlands Film Festival, the Jury Award at the 2001 Newport Beach Film Festival and the Best Actress Award at the 1999 Buenos Aires International Festival of Independent Cinema.

== Early life ==
Monic Hendrickx was born in 1966 in the Netherlands. At the age of three, she and her family moved to Paramaribo, Suriname. Eventually Hendrickx started her acting education at Toneelschool in Maastricht.

== Career ==
Hendrickx made her screen debut in The Polish Bride.

In 2007 she filmed an English language adaptation of The Polish Bride in Australia. The film was called Unfinished Sky and her character was changed from a Polish woman to an Afghan refugee. For her performance, she won the 2008 AFI Award for Best Actress in a Leading Role.

From 2010 to 2017, she played the lead role of crime boss Carmen van Walraven in the five seasons of Dutch series Penoza, known in some countries as Black Widow. She won awards for her work on the show, including the Golden Calf for Best Actress in a TV-Drama in 2013.

In 2018, Hendrickx was a presenter on Crown Witness (Game Show). She appeared on The Voice Senior. That same year, it was announced that she would appear in the international vampire series Heirs of the Night.

In 2019, she appeared in the film, The Promise of Pisa as Iris Versluys.

== Selected filmography ==
Film
Year	Title	Role	Notes
2019	De Belofte van Pisa	Iris Versluys	
2016	De Held		
2014	Nena	Martha	
2014	Kenau	Kenau	
2012	Het Bombardement		
2011	Sonny Boy		
2009	The Storm		
2008	De Brief voor de Koning	Mother of Tiuri	
2007	Unfinished Sky	Tahmeena	
2007	Nadine	Nadine	
2005	Medea	de Vries	
2005	Leef!	Anna	
2005	Diep		
2004	South	Martje Portegies	
2003	Dwaalgast	Hester	
2001	The Moving True Story of a Woman Ahead of Her Time	Nynke van Hichtum	
2001	Zus & Zo		
1998	The Polish Bride	Anna Krzyzanowska	

Television
Year	Title	Role	Notes
2019	Heirs of the Night	Elisabetha	
2010-2017	Penoza	Carmen van Walraven	
