= List of 1997 films based on actual events =

This is a list of films and miniseries released in 1997 that are based on actual events. All films on this list are from American production unless indicated otherwise.

== 1997 ==
- ...First Do No Harm (1997) – drama television film about a boy whose severe epilepsy, unresponsive to medications with terrible side effects, is controlled by the ketogenic diet, aspects of the story mirror Jim Abrahams' experience with his son Charlie
- A Child's Wish (1997) – drama television film based on actual events of a family who discovers their 16-year-old daughter has cancer
- Amistad (1997) – historical drama film based on the events in 1839 aboard the Spanish slave ship La Amistad, during which Mende tribesmen abducted for the slave trade managed to gain control of their captors' ship off the coast of Cuba, and the international legal battle that followed their capture by the Washington, a U.S. revenue cutter
- An Eyewitness Account (Italian: Testimone a rischio) (1997) – Italian thriller drama film based on real life events of Sicilian Mafia hit eyewitness Piero Nava
- Anastasia (1997) – animated musical drama film based on the legend of Grand Duchess Anastasia Nikolaevna of Russia
- Annamayya (Telugu: అన్నమయ్య) (1997) – Indian Telugu-language biographical drama film portraying the life of the 15th century composer Annamacharya
- Any Mother's Son (1997) – crime drama television film based on the murder of Allen Schindler, a United States Navy sailor who was killed for being gay
- The Arrow (1997) – Canadian historical drama miniseries about Crawford Gordon, experienced wartime production leader after World War II and president of Avro Canada during its attempt to produce the Avro Arrow supersonic jet interceptor aircraft
- Artemisia (1997) – French-Italian-German biographical drama film about Artemisia Gentileschi, the female Italian Baroque painter
- Black Circle Boys (1997) – thriller drama film loosely based on real events filled with drugs, satanism & murder
- Boogie Nights (1997) – historical comedy drama film focusing on a young nightclub dishwasher who becomes a popular star of pornographic films, chronicling his rise in the Golden Age of Porn of the 1970s through his fall during the excesses of the 1980s, based on actor John Holmes
- Border (Hindi: सीमा) (1997) – Indian Hindi-language epic war film inspired by real life events that happened during the Battle of Longewala in 1971
- Breaking the Surface: The Greg Louganis Story (1997) – biographical sport drama television film about American diver Greg Louganis
- Buddy (1997) – family comedy drama film based on the life of a gorilla called Massa with elements of Gertrude Lintz's other gorilla Gargantua (who was called "Buddy" at the time)
- Comedian Harmonists (1997) – German biographical drama film about the popular German vocal group of the 1920s and '30s, the Comedian Harmonists
- Country Justice (1997) – crime drama television film based on a true story of a 1981 West Virginia court case
- Crowned and Dangerous (1997) – crime drama television film about the murder of a beauty queen, an investigation which reveals the suspects to be a former lover, a rival contestant, and a stage mother, based on a true story
- Dang Bireley's and Young Gangsters (Thai: 2499 อันธพาลครองเมือง) (1997) – Thai crime drama film about young Thai gangsters in 1950s Thailand
- Daughters (1997) – thriller drama television film based on the true crime story about the murder of publishing heiress Anne Scripps Douglas who, in 1989, married a young hunk who eventually killed her
- David (1997) – Christian drama television film telling the biblical story of David
- Detention: The Siege at Johnson High (1997) – thriller drama television film based on the 1992 Lindhurst High School shooting and siege that resulted in the death of four people
- Don King: Only in America (1997) – biographical sport drama television film telling the story of Don King becoming a famous fight promoter and boxing manager
- Donnie Brasco (1997) – biographical crime drama film loosely based on the true story of Joseph D. Pistone, a FBI undercover agent who infiltrated the Bonanno crime family in New York City during the 1970s, under the alias Donnie Brasco, a jewel thief from Vero Beach, Florida
- Dukhai (Bengali: দুখাই) (1997) – Bangladeshi drama film showing the struggle of the people of the shore in the 1970 Bhola cyclone
- Elvis Meets Nixon (1997) – Canadian-American biographical drama television film depicting an embellished account of the true story of American singer Elvis Presley meeting President Richard Nixon on 21 December 1970
- FairyTale: A True Story (1997) – fantasy drama film loosely based on the story of the Cottingley Fairies, and following two children in 1917 England who take a photograph soon believed to be the first scientific evidence of the existence of fairies
- Fever Pitch (1997) – British comedy drama film loosely on Nick Hornby's best-selling memoir, Fever Pitch: A Fan's Life (1992), concentrating on Arsenal's First Division championship-winning season in 1988–89
- First Time Felon (1997) – crime drama film telling the story of the arrest, incarceration, shock incarceration program, home detention with electronic surveillance, and efforts to find employment experienced by a young black male who lived in Chicago and was arrested for drug possession, based on a true story
- For All: Springboard to Victory (Portuguese: For All – O Trampolim da Vitória) (1997) – Brazilian comedy drama film about a US established military base in Natal, Brazil during World War II
- Four Days in September (Portuguese: O Que É Isso, Companheiro?) (1997) – Brazilian thriller film depicting a dramatization of the 1969 kidnapping of the United States Ambassador to Brazil, Charles Burke Elbrick, by members of Revolutionary Movement 8th October (MR-8) and Ação Libertadora Nacional (ALN)
- Frozen (Mandarin: 极度寒冷) (1997) – Chinese drama film following a young performance artist, Qi Lei, who attempts to create a masterpiece centred on the theme of death, supposedly based on a true story
- The Gambler (1997) – biographical drama film set around the writing of the 1866 novel The Gambler by Fyodor Dostoyevsky
- Gaston's War (1997) – Belgian war drama film telling the story of a Belgian resistance fighter, Gaston Vandermeerssche, who tries to discover who betrayed them to the Nazis
- George Wallace (1997) – biographical drama miniseries following Alabama governor George Wallace through segregation, presidential elections, an assassination attempt and personal trauma
- Get to the Heart: The Barbara Mandrell Story (1997) – biographical drama television film chronicling country music singer Barbara Mandrell's life and career, from her early years in her family's band to her rise to country music fame, and the 1984 car accident that nearly ended her career
- Hav Plenty (1997) – romantic comedy film based on the true story of Christopher Scott Cherot's unrequited romance with Def Jam A&R executive Drew Dixon
- Hoodlum (1997) – crime drama film depicting a fictionalized account of the gang war between the Italian/Jewish mafia alliance and the black gangsters of Harlem that took place in the late 1920s and early 1930s
- Into Thin Air: Death on Everest (1997) – disaster drama television film telling the story of the 1996 Mount Everest disaster
- Iruvar (Tamil: இருவர்) (1997) – Indian Tamil-language epic political drama film inspired by the lives of M. Karunanidhi, M. G. Ramachandran and J. Jayalalithaa and is set against the backdrop of cinema and politics in Tamil Nadu
- Joe Torre: Curveballs Along the Way (1997) – biographical sport drama television film chronicling Joe Torre's first year as manager of the New York Yankees when they won the World Series in 1996
- Keeping the Promise (1997) – American-Canadian historical drama television film based on a factual story that Elizabeth George Speare discovered in Milo, Maine about a young boy who was left alone for a summer in the wilderness and was befriended by a Native American, named Attean, and his grandfather
- Kundun (1997) – epic biographical film based on the life and writings of Tenzin Gyatso, the 14th Dalai Lama, the exiled political and spiritual leader of Tibet
- The Last of the Ryans (1997) – Australian biographical drama television film following the escape, re capture and hanging of Ronald Ryan for the murder of prison guard George Hodson
- The Last Time I Committed Suicide (1997) – biographical drama film based on a 1950 letter written by Neal Cassady to Jack Kerouac
- Lewis & Clark: The Journey of the Corps of Discovery (1997) – biographical drama miniseries about the Lewis and Clark Expedition
- Love's Deadly Triangle: The Texas Cadet Murder (1997) – drama television film based on the real life murder of Adrianne Jones by Diane Zamora in Texas
- Lucie Aubrac (1997) – French biographical drama film about World War II French Resistance member Lucie Aubrac
- The Manson Family (1997) – crime exploitation horror film covering the lives of Charles Manson and his family of followers
- The Mad Phoenix (Cantonese: 南海十三郎) (1997) – Hong Kong biographical drama film depicting the life of the legend Cantonese Opera playwright Kong Yu-Kau
- Marquise (1997) – French historical drama film based on the historical actress Marquise-Thérèse de Gorla, who rises from obscurity to win the hearts of some of France's most prominent citizens, including Moliere, Racine, and King Louis XIV
- Midnight in the Garden of Good and Evil (1997) – mystery thriller film following the story of antiques dealer Jim Williams on trial for the murder of a male prostitute who was his lover
- Mother Teresa: In the Name of God's Poor (1997) – biographical drama television film about the life of Mother Teresa
- Mrs Brown (1997) – British biographical historical drama film telling the story of a recently widowed Queen Victoria and her relationship with a Scottish servant, John Brown, a trusted servant of her deceased husband, and the subsequent uproar it provoked
- My Heart Is Mine Alone (German: Mein Herz – niemandem!) (1997) – German drama film depicting the real-life love affair between Jewish poet Else Lasker-Schüler and Nazi poet Gottfried Benn
- Night Bus 807 (Swedish: Nattbuss 807) (1997) – Swedish crime thriller film based on a true story and events of the 1992 murder of a young boy in Vendelsömalm during the Stockholm Water Festival
- No Child of Mine (1997) – British biographical drama television film documenting the true case of a girl named Kerry who was sexually abused throughout her childhood
- The Opium War (Mandarin: 鸦片战争) (1997) – Chinese historical epic film telling the story of the First Opium War of 1839–1842, which was fought between the Qing Empire of China and the British Empire, from the perspectives of key figures such as the Chinese viceroy Lin Zexu and the British naval diplomat Charles Elliot
- Paradise Road (1997) – Australian war drama film telling the story of a group of English, American, Dutch and Australian women who are imprisoned by the Japanese in Sumatra during World War II
- Path to Paradise: The Untold Story of the World Trade Center Bombing (1997) – drama television film depicting the events surrounding the 1993 World Trade Center bombing
- Pierre and Marie (French: Les Palmes de M. Schutz) (1997) – French biographical drama film about the lives of Marie and Pierre Curie and their discoveries around radioactivity
- The Place of the Dead (1997) – British adventure thriller television film based on a true account of a British Army expedition in Malaysia that made headlines in 1994 when it went badly wrong
- Prefontaine (1997) – biographical drama film chronicling the life of the American long-distance runner Steve Prefontaine and his death at age 24
- Prison of Secrets (1997) – crime drama television film based on a true story and focusing on a female prison inmate who fights for women's rights while still in jail
- Private Parts (1997) – biographical comedy film following radio personality Howard Stern's life from boyhood and his rise to success in radio
- Regeneration (1997) – British biographical drama film following the stories of a number of officers of the British Army during World War I who are brought together in Craiglockhart War Hospital where they are treated for various traumas, featuring the story of Siegfried Sassoon
- Rizal in Dapitan (Filipino: Rizal sa Dapitan) (1997) – Filipino biographical drama film about the four-year exile of Filipino propagandist and patriot José Rizal in Dapitan
- Rosewood (1997) – historical drama film inspired by the 1923 Rosewood massacre in Florida, when a white mob killed black people and destroyed their town
- Rough Riders (1997) – historical biographical drama miniseries about future President Theodore Roosevelt and the regiment known as the 1st US Volunteer Cavalry; a.k.a. the Rough Riders
- The Sarah Balabagan Story (1997) – Filipino biographical drama film about Sarah Balabagan, an OFW who was sentenced to death in the United Arab Emirates for killing her employer who was attempting to rape her
- Selena (1997) – biographical musical drama film about Tejano music star Selena Quintanilla-Pérez
- Seven Years in Tibet (1997) – biographical war drama film about Heinrich Harrer and Peter Aufschnaiter's experiences in Tibet between 1944 and 1951
- Shanghai 1937 (1997) – German war drama miniseries about the Japanese invasion of China also known as the Second Sino-Japanese War begins in 1937 as a precursor to World War II
- Sins of the Mind (1997) – psychological drama television film telling the story of a conservative young woman who develops uncontrollable sexual urges as a result of a traffic accident and subsequent brain damage, inspired by a true story
- Sleeping with the Devil (1997) – thriller drama television film based on a true story about a woman recovering from a domestic-violence relationship who finds out that her former partner still wants her, even if it means killing her
- The Sleepwalker Killing (1997) – crime drama television film inspired by a true story about a man who claims he was sleepwalking when he killed his mother-in-law
- Solomon (1997) – Christian drama miniseries retelling the biblical story of Solomon
- The Soong Sisters (Cantonese: 宋家皇朝) (1997) – Hong Kong historical drama film based on the lives of the Soong sisters from 1911 to 1949
- Stolen Women: Captured Hearts (1997) – Western romantic drama television film about a woman living on the plains of Kansas in 1868 who is kidnapped by a band of Lakota Indians, loosely based on the real Anna Morgan who was taken by Cheyenne Indians for approximately one year before being returned to her husband
- Subway Stories (1997) – anthology drama film based on the actual experiences of New York City subway riders and dramatized in a collection of 10 intriguing and very different vignettes
- Thomas Jefferson (1997) – historical biographical miniseries covering the life and times of Thomas Jefferson, the 3rd President of the United States
- Titanic (1997) – disaster drama film based on accounts of the sinking of RMS Titanic in 1912
- True Women (1997) – Western adventure miniseries covering five decades, from the Texas Revolution through Native American uprisings and the Civil War to the early stages of the women's suffrage movement
- Vasiliki (Greek: Βασιλική) (1997) – Greek drama film presenting the riotous years immediately after the Greek Civil War
- Wild America (1997) – adventure comedy film based on the life of wildlife documentarian Marty Stouffer
- Wilde (1997) – British biographical romantic drama film chronicling the turmoil in Oscar Wilde's life after he discovers his homosexuality
