= Fernand Auwera =

Belgian author (1929–2015)

Ferdinand Auwera
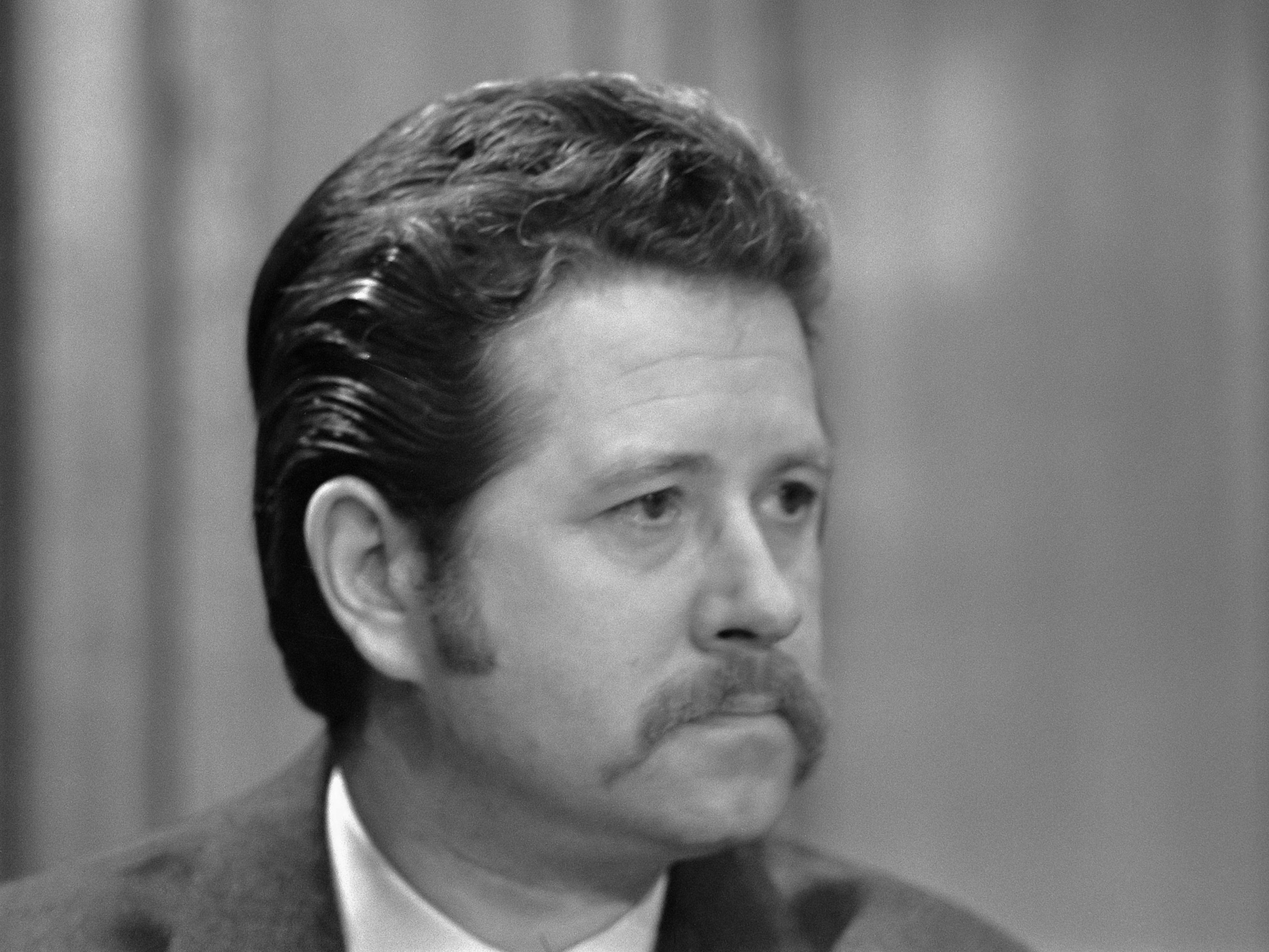
- Auwera in 1970
- Born: Ferdinand Henri Leon van der Auwera; 26 November 1929; Antwerp, Belgium
- Died: 27 October 2015 (aged 85); Antwerp, Belgium
- Occupations: Playwright, novelist, poet

Ferdinand Van der Auwera (26 November 1929, in Antwerp – 27 October 2015), pseudonym Fernand Auwera was a Belgian writer. His fragile health during his youth and its impact on his life (solitude), had an effect on his first literary work.

== Life and work ==
He started his career as a civil servant and worked for the journal Volkskrant and the literary magazine Dietsche Warande en Belfort. He made his literary debut with the psychological novel De weddenschap (E: The bet) in (1963). Later he made the statement that he wrote as a therapy, such as with Zelfportret met gesloten ogen (E: Self-portrait with closed eyes) (1973) and Uit het raam springen moet als nutteloos worden beschouwd (E: Jumping out of the window must be considered useless) (1983), which was made into a movie Springen. In Schrijven of schieten (E: Writing or shooting) (1969) and Geen daden maar woorden (E: No deeds but words) (1970), he published several interviews with fellow writers. In addition he wrote some books for children and literary essays. He contributed to the screenplays of the movies De Witte van Sichem (1980) after Ernest Claes and Lijmen/Het Been (2000) after Willem Elsschot.

== Bibliography ==
=== Novels ===
- 1963 – De weddenschap
- 1963 – Het manneke en de roestige ridders
- ? – Het manneke en de zielige zeerovers
- ? – Het manneke en de grimmige goochelaar
- 1964 – De donderzonen
- 1965 – De koning van de bijen
- 1967 – Mathias ‘t Kofschip
- 1968 – In memoriam A.L.
- 1969 – Vogels met rode beulskoppen
- 1973 – Zelfportret met gesloten ogen
- 1974 – We beginnen de dag opgeruimd en lopen rond de tafel
- 1976 – Bloemen verwelken, schepen vergaan...
- 1977 – Zonder onderschriften, 'n kleurboek voor volwassenen
- 1978 – De nachtridders
- 1978 – Ik wou dat ik een marathonloper was
- 1983 – Uit het raam springen moet als nutteloos worden beschouwd. Adapted into Jumping (film)
- 1985 – Chantage
- 1985 – De gnokkel
- 1986 – De toren van Babel is geen puinhoop
- 1987 – Zeer slordig woordenboek
- 1989 – Wachttijd
- 1990 – Een duidelijk maar doodlopend spoor
- 1992 – Memoires van een afwezige
- 1993 – Tedere schade
- 1994 – De nachten van Andreas Richter
- 1995 – De man in de stoel
- 1995 – Een hart in het lijf
- 1996 – De man in de stoel en andere novellen
- 1996 – Een hond van Vlaanderen
- 1997 – De katten van Krakau
- 2001 – Vliegen in een spinnenweb
- 2002 – Brahms voor Hitler
- 2007 – Indirect bewijs
- 2011 – Kleurvaste kameleons

=== Non-fiction ===
- 1969 – Schrijven of schieten
- 1970 – Geen daden maar woorden
- 1972 – Piet Van Aken
- 1979 – Cowboy spelen
- 1980 – C. Budding’
- 1982 – The Child is Father of the Man
- 1982 – Een vete, with Heere Heeresma)
- 1984 – Huilen met de pet op
- 1984 – Mooie, gekwetste ziel (texts with illustrations by Jan Vanriet)
- 1985 – Engagement of escapisme?
- 1985 – Marc Sleen, with Jan Smet
- 1986 – Het Antwerps kroegenboek
- 1992 – Schrijvers drinken om helder te blijven
- 1993 – Cultuurstad Antwerpen, with George van Cauwenbergh
- 1998 – Antwerpen centraal
- 1999 – Willem Elsschot

=== Children's books ===
- 1960 – Kamiel de geleerde kameel
- 1961 – Okidoki’s reis naar de sterren
- 1961 – Een fort in de rimboe
- 1962 – Verkenners varen naar Indië
- 1962 – Silvester de stenen kabouter
- 1963 – Het Manneke en de roestige ridder
- 1963 – De St. Maartensramp
- 1965 – Misdaad in de dierentuin
- 1966 – Karel Kruisdegen en de inktvissen
- 1966 – De dode kathedraal
- 1976 – Wat moet ik nu beginnen? vroeg de koning
- 1976 – De gnokkel en andere verhalen

=== Film scenarist ===
- 1978 – De weddenschap (TV)
- 1980 – De Witte van Sichem, with Robbe De Hert
- 1982 – Maria Danneels (of het leven dat we droomden)
- 1991 – Elias of het gevecht met de nachtegalen
- 1995 – De ooggetuige
- 1997 – Gaston's War
- 2000 – Lijmen/Het Been

== Awards ==
- 1967 – Provinciale Prijs voor het Proza van de Provincie Antwerp (Mathias ‘t Kofschip)
- 1967 – Yangprijs (Mathias ‘t Kofschip)
- 1974 – August Beernaertprijs (nl) (Zelfportret met gesloten ogen)
- 1974 – Arkprijs van het Vrije Woord (Zelfportret met gesloten ogen)
- 1995 – Sabamprijs for literature
- 2008 – Prijs van verdienste (nl)
- 2011 – Provinciale prijs voor letterkunde 2010

== See also ==
- Flemish literature

== Sources ==
- Fernand Auwera (in Dutch)
- Fernand Auwera (in Dutch)
- G.J. van Bork, P.J. Verkruijsse, De Nederlandse en Vlaamse auteurs (1985)
