= Alfred J. Kwak =

Children's animated comedy-drama television series

- Logo of Alfred J. Kwak
- Japanese: あひるのクワック
- Based on: Theatre show by Herman van Veen
- Screenplay by: Akira Miyazaki
- Directed by: Hiroshi Saitō
- Music by: Erik van der Wurff; Harry Sacksioni; Herman van Veen; Hans-Jürgen Buchner
- Countries of origin: Netherlands; West Germany; Japan; Spain
- Original languages: Dutch; Japanese
- No. of episodes: 52

Production
- Executive producer: Kazuo Tabata
- Producers: Mutsuo Shimizu; Manabu Tamura; Sumio Takahashi
- Running time: 22−23 minutes
- Production companies: Telecable Benelux B.V.; VARA; ZDF; Televisión Española; TV Tokyo

Original release
- Network: TV Tokyo
- Release: 3 April 1989 – 29 March 1990
- Network: Nederland 1
- Release: 24 December 1989 – 16 March 1991
- Network: ZDF
- Release: 13 October 1990 – 16 February 1993
- Network: TVE 1
- Release: 20 April 1991 – 1992

Alfred J. Kwak (Note: Known in Japan as Kwak the Duck (Japanese: あひるのクワック, Hepburn: Ahiru no Kuwakku)) is a children's animated comedy-drama television series based on a Dutch theatre show by Herman van Veen. It was produced by Telecable Benelux B.V. in co-production with VARA, ZDF, Televisión Española, and TV Tokyo, and was animated by Telescreen Japan. (Note: Production assistance for all episodes provided by Teleimage and Visual 80.) It consists of 52 episodes, which were first aired in 1989. The series characters were designed by Harald Siepermann. There are also toys and a comic based on the animated series.

The series has been broadcast in many countries and has been dubbed and subtitled in Dutch, French, Japanese, Greek, English, Italian, Spanish, Hebrew, Arabic, Hungarian, Finnish, Serbian, Polish, German, Swedish, Danish, Icelandic, Chinese, Czech, Romanian, Korean, and Norwegian.

In 1991, Herman van Veen won the Goldene Kamera award for the cartoon.

== Origins ==
When our children were still young, I wrote the first story about Alfred Jodocus Kwak. Actually, there were two reasons prompting this. One night, I was driving home in my car through the polder (countryside), when I accidentally ran over a duck crossing the road. I regretted it deeply. A few days later, I was on the telephone at home and saw a mother duck and seven little ducklings wobbling through our garden. The man I was talking to on the phone was the leader of a symphonic orchestra. He asked if I could write a fairytale and if I could come over and tell and sing about it, while the orchestra would provide musical accompaniment. Whilst talking on the phone, I thought: "Could that mother duck be looking for her husband? And how do you explain to a duck that you've run over another duck?" "Hello, hello?", the voice on the phone said, "What are you thinking about?" "I'm thinking of a duck", I replied. The man said: "Excellent, so you'll write us a fairytale about a duck." And that's how Alfred Jodocus Kwak was born, by accident.

— Herman van Veen

== Plot ==
Alfred J. Kwak was born as the son of Johan Sebastian and Anna Kwak. Some time after his birth, Alfred loses his parents and his brothers and sisters after a car hits them as they are moving their home during a heavy rainstorm. Alfred was saved due to his being distracted by a frog, which he broke away from his family to chase. Henk the mole, a good friend of the Kwak family, raises the little orphan duck. Alfred experiences a lot of adventures.

Unlike many other cartoons targeted for children, Alfred J. Kwak features exceptionally mature and often dark themes. Amongst others, it deals with different social and political issues, such as abuse of power, but also raises important values such as friendship and solidarity.

The cartoon is also notable for the political themes it touches. In the cartoon, Alfred fights against a fascist dictator, takes in refugees fleeing from a country under apartheid (with white geese and black ducks), saves whales against hunters, and oversees the changeover of his country from an absolute monarchy to a constitutional monarchy with a democratically elected president. Such themes are far from typical in a children's cartoon, and form a big part of Alfred J. Kwak's appeal. Other episodes have satirised the Japanese love of golf, and criticised countries which have sharp north/south economic divides.

The cartoon is also unusual for the subtlety of its long-term narrative. In most children's cartoons, the characters do not age. In Alfred J. Kwak, we see the progress of the main characters from very young children to adulthood as the series advances. This is particularly striking in the character of Dolf, who is initially a mere schoolboy, but who, as time passes, becomes a criminal and a dictator.

=== Setting ===
The time setting of the cartoon is somewhat surreal. On the whole, the technology and dress of most characters seem appropriate to the late 20th century, and yet Alfred and Paljas/Boffin often travel in a spaceship with a technology far more advanced than that, while many characters such as the king's staff, Scratchpaws the cat, and Dolf in his Napoleonic incarnation wear clothes more appropriate to previous ages. Other surreal elements to the cartoon include such strange characters as the evil genie of the bottle, living chess pieces from Alfred's chess game, Pied Piper-style Clown on the Moon, and aliens who appear like ducks except for their human-style feet, and a "dream" style Wild West episode during which Dolf seems to become aware that he is a character in a cartoon.

== Characters ==
=== Main characters ===
==== Alfred ====
Alfred Jodocus Kwak is a duck. As a baby, he lived in a giant clog with his family. After his family was run over by a car, he was adopted by Henk and lives with him in Henk's grandfather's house. Later Alfred moves into a clog-shaped house, using his old cradle as his bed. He is very concerned with other people and values many virtues, like human rights and good manners. Friends, family and the environment, are also close to his heart and he in some episodes even risks his own safety when it comes to doing the right thing. Although he has gone through a lot of sad things, his favourite song is 'Ik ben vandaag zo vrolijk' (I'm so happy today). In the English version, his middle name is changed to "Johnathan". In the Hebrew version, his name is "Shealtiel". In the Icelandic version, he is named Alfreð Önd.

==== Dolf ====
Dolf is Alfred's archenemy and first appears in episode 4. In the first episode Dolf's parents, a crow and a blackbird, can be seen making disparaging comments on the eggs of Alfred's mother. Both are dressed in traditional German garments. The father wears lederhosen, a feathered hat and, in the Dutch original, speaks with a heavy German accent, while Dolf's mother is seen in a dirndl outfit. In the German version, Dolf is called Kra, in the Finnish version, he is called Korppi.

Oh, they look repulsive. Waterfowl aren't real birds, like us. So in a way I can understand why they are so vile and disgusting.

— Dolf's father, episode 1

Dolf gradually develops from a mere naughty schoolboy to a merciless dictator, an arms dealer, a reckless politician, and an overall criminal. Though the show clearly portrays Dolf's acts as inherently negative and wrong, it also provides the background on how Dolf became who he is. For example, as a child, Dolf is prone to blame others for problems in which he too played a role. Dolf mentions that his mother died very early and that his father neglects him due to alcoholism. Dolf can also be seen to express a sense of self-hate and poor self-image; as he is disgusted by the fact that he is only part crow, and paints his orange beak black to disguise his true identity. When Alfred accidentally finds out about this, he cannot understand why Dolf is so ashamed and urges him to drop the secret and tell others about it. Dolf however is petrified and convinced that his friends will make fun of him, and makes Alfred swear he will never tell anyone about it.

Episodes 22 through 25 are essentially an allegory of the rise and fall of Fascism and Nazism, with Dolf himself, though wearing a Napoleonic uniform, as a clear caricature of Adolf Hitler. It begins with Dolf returning from abroad, in a train with Austrian markings, and meeting up with his friends. He then discusses the current political climate in Great Waterland, and expresses disgust with it. Dolf then decides to found a political party, the latter National Crows Party, for which he goes to Alfred to lend money. He explains his ideas, but Alfred refuses and Dolf barges out of Alfred's house in a fit of rage. Alfred and Henk express their fear of Dolf, but Henk reassures Alfred that Dolf will never gather enough money to fund his intended party. Not much later however, Dolf inherits a huge fortune. He founds his party, which through promising employment and change quickly becomes a major and powerful political movement. Dolf eventually stages a coup d'etat and takes over the country. Political opponents, including Alfred, are imprisoned on the charge of high treason. Alfred and his friends barely escape and flee abroad to the neighbouring country of Great Reedland. Not much later the King of Great Waterland himself flees as well, and Dolf proclaims himself Emperor Dolf I. Alfred and the other political dissidents however devised a plan to dispose of Dolf and steal Dolf's inheritance from the vaults of his palace. Without his money, Dolf's power quickly dwindles and he is forced to flee.

Dolf eventually makes an appearance as an illegal arms dealer and general criminal in further episodes. In the 43rd and 44th episodes, the King has decided to abdicate and for the first time, democratic elections are held. Dolf once again attempts to rule Great Waterland as one of the three official candidates. In order to get ahead of the other two candidates (Ollie being the first candidate), he hires some foreigners to sabotage the dam, which protects the waterland from being flooded by the seawater. After the dam has broken, Dolf cunningly withdraws his entry because he wants to "help" people and cannot waste time on a campaign. Dolf then publicly funds the repairs of the dam, skyrocketing his popularity and prompting his reentry in the presidential race. He then, in an attempt to get rid of any compromising evidence, tries to kill Lispel, who saw the criminal act. Lispel manages to escape and, though heavily wounded, can tell Alfred the truth about the flood.

Dolf manages to escape and continues his life of crime. In the final two episodes, Dolf becomes the henchman of an oil magnate who is attempting to get his hands on the blueprints of an environmentally friendly fuel, invented by Professor Buffon. After a fight, in which Dolf attempts to kill Alfred by pushing his car off the road, Dolf is again captured and is sentenced to 26 years of imprisonment. Aided by a former member of his Crows Party, he can escape and takes Winnie, Alfred's girlfriend, hostage. In the series' finale, after a manic hunt, Alfred finds Dolf, who tells him where Winnie is. After telling Alfred her whereabouts, Dolf attempts to escape, only to be caught by the police and put back into prison.

==== Henk ====
Henk is a mole and the adoptive father of Alfred. In the Israeli version, he is called Hafi, a diminutive for "Hafarperet" - the Hebrew word for "mole".

==== Winnie ====
Winnie is a black duck and Alfred's girlfriend, her name is a reference to Winnie Mandela. In the Dutch version, she speaks Afrikaans-accented Dutch; Afrikaans being a language closely related to Dutch and spoken in South Africa. Alfred meets her and her family, in episode 27, on a train leaving for Great Waterland after his holidays. Her family are refugees who escaped from their home country after it had been taken over by white geese. After Alfred helps her parents to sort out the problems in her country, she joins Alfred on many of his adventures and holidays. She works in the local university as a secretary (as first seen in episode 34) and lives with her brother Tom in a little house near the forest.

=== Secondary characters ===
- Professor Paljas is an interdisciplinary academic. He is a polar bear, and speaks with a German accent. In the UK, Hungarian, Serbian, and Israeli versions he is called Professor Buffon. He makes his first appearance in episode 18, in which he attempts to communicate with the whales in the South Pole using his new invention "Jonus". He returns in episode 26, in which he asks Alfred to join him on his expedition to the Himalayas. He also travels (with Alfred of course), to Egypt to find the only medicine which can cure his ill colleague, and to the jungle to investigate a volcano which keeps erupting. He cares a lot about the environment and develops a petrol for vehicles that doesn't expose any carbon monoxide and prevents acid rain.
- Ollie is Alfred's close school-friend, a stork, who grows up to be a lawyer, and later, after the defeat of Dolf, the first democratically elected president of Great Waterland. In the Dutch version, Ollie is a girl during childhood, but a male when he is an adult, confirming his status as transgender. This change is never directly addressed in the series. In a Dutch interview from 2013 however, Van Veen stated that this gender change was intentional, since that also happens in the real world. In the Israeli version, Ollie is a female and is named Luli.
- Pikkie is another friend of Alfred's from his schooldays. A magpie, Pikkie is prone to stealing shiny objects, a trait which often lands his friends in trouble. Pikkie is called Stibitzi (and portrayed as female) in the German version, Ruby in the Israeli version, Grabbie in the UK version, Hannu in the Finnish version and Grabljivko in the Serbian version. He makes his first appearance in episode 2, in which he attends Alfred's first birthday party. He steals the king's ruby during a visit to the king's castle and Alfred gets blamed for it. He is often seen in the early episodes when Alfred was still at school. After episode 12 he isn't seen or spoken of for 19 episodes. We are not told what he did or where he was during Dolf's activism and other events. Alfred and Henk meet him again coincidentally on an oil rig, sporting a stubbly beard, where he worked as a diamond expert. In episode 49 he falls from the sky in front of Alfred's house after trying to fly to the rainbow. He joins Alfred, Prof. Paljas and Henk on an expedition to the rainforest in which the legendary Pot of Gold is kept. His weakness for shiny objects persuades him to steal it but Dolf takes it from him at the airport.
- Franz Ferdinand is a lion and the king of Great Waterland, the country in which Alfred lives. He is a well-meaning, yet lazy and incompetent monarch, with no interest in politics. He is named after the real historical figure Franz Ferdinand. He makes his first appearance in episode 2. In episode 20 Alfred wonders what kind of a king he is. He then is shown lying in his lemonade bath and enjoying life, when a servant comes in and tells him that the messenger from Great Sparrowland has arrived and wants to speak to him. The king claims that he just got into the bath, but the servant reassures him that he's been in it for over two hours. The king asks the servant to speak with the messenger for him but since his signature is needed he reluctantly gets out of the bath. In episode 21 the king goes bankrupt and is forced to take a loan from Alfred, which he doesn't pay back. After the rise of Dolf, the exiled king realises how careless and reluctant he has been, and begins to take an interest in politics. After Dolf's fall, in the planning of which Franz Ferdinand was involved, he became a just and beloved king. In episode 43 however, he decides to surrender all his executive power and remain only as a ceremonial head of state, with a democratically elected president as the actual head of government.
- Lispel is a sinister jellyfish and a spy working for the mayor of the city. As his name suggests, he talks with a lisp. He makes his first appearance in episode 7 as a contact to another agent. In episodes 14, 16 & 19 he informs the mayor of Alfred's plans to prevent him from making ships that catch all fish of the world. In episode 23, during Dolf's activism, Lispel informs Dolf where Alfred and his friends are hiding after they escaped imprisonment. In episode 27 he sees Alfred taking in the refugees and threatens to tell the authorities unless he gets three gold coins. Alfred gives him the money but doesn't listen to Lispel's information (which he must tell him, because he had his money). After several attempts to make Alfred listen to him, Lispel does go to the police and betrays them. Lispel makes some minor appearances in later episodes, but in episode 44, before the presidential elections, he sees Dolf and some hired foreigners damaging the dam which causes a huge flood. Dolf pays for repairs and equipment to become more popular, but Lispel threatens to tell unless he gets his gold. Dolf refuses because he thinks that Lispel will keep returning for more gold. By the docks (their meeting point), Dolf pulls out a revolver and shoots Lispel several times. Lispel falls into the sea. Later in the episode he stands, badly injured, in Alfred's front garden and tells him everything. His last appearance is in episode 51 in which he informs the mayor of Prof. Paljas's plans on making a petrol which doesn't expose any gases or fumes. He receives his payment, leaves the mayor's house and is never seen again. He is not present at Alfred's birthday in the last episode.

=== Setting ===
==== Great Waterland ====
Great Waterland (Groot-Waterland in Dutch) is arguably the most important setting within the series. It is Alfred's birthplace as well as the home, or future home, of many of the show's characters. It is, partly, a caricature of the Netherlands. The land consists of polders, the town Alfred lives in is built in a typical Dutch style, while he himself lives in a house made from a clog. For most of the series, Great Waterland is an absolute monarchy, led by Franz Ferdinand, a lion. Near the conclusion of the show's first season, Dolf assumes command, and Waterland briefly becomes an authoritarian fascist state, before reverting to a monarchy, and eventually becoming a constitutional monarchy with an elected president.

== Episode list ==
Season 1

1. Alfred Comes to Life
2. Alfred's First Birthday
3. The Ruby of the Crown
4. My Father Is Henk
5. Dolf's Secret
6. The Great Race
7. Sea Scouts Part 1
8. Sea Scouts Part 2
9. The Strange Bottle
10. Flying Carpet
11. Alfred Joins the Circus
12. Alfred's Chess Adventure
13. The Queen Loses Her Crown
14. Let's Find the Sawfish
15. Alfred's Perilous Voyage
16. The Search for the Whales
17. Visitors from Outer Space
18. The Southern Cross
19. The Ocean Belong to All of Us
20. Desert Dream
21. The King Takes a Loan
22. Dolf Is Justice
23. Escape from the Crow Party
24. Emperor Dolf the First
25. The Decline and Fall of Emperor Dolf
26. The Snowman

Season 2

27. Love at First Sight
28. A Gift from the King
29. Journey to At
30. A Turtle Island
31. Drilling for Oil
32. They Come to Atlantis
33. Gunfight at Tombstone
34. The Riddle of the Pyramid
35. The Labyrinth
36. The Course of True Love
37. An Invitation from the Prince
38. Love Unites
39. Who Wants to Marry a Witch
40. The Stolen Pan
41. The Volcano Erupts
42. Save the Dragon
43. Vote for Ollie
44. Dolf Takes a Chance
45. The Strange Epidemic
46. Clown on the Moon
47. The Magic Fiddle
48. How About a Game of Golf
49. Looking for the Rainbow
50. Pot of Gold
51. Forests of Fuel?
52. Dolf's Last Stand

== Theme songs and voice actors ==
=== Dutch version ===
Spetter Pieter Pater

- Performed by Herman van Veen (OP)

Zo vrolijk

- Performed by Ryan van den Akker and Herman van Veen (ED)

=== Dutch ===
Alfred J. Kwak is one of the first cartoon series in the Netherlands to feature an (almost) all-star cast. Actress Ryan van den Akker is Alfred, and Herman van Veen is Professor Paljas (an alternate phrase for fool, clown).

=== Japanese version ===
Yakusoku da yo (約束だよ)

- Performed by Megumi Hayashibara (OP)

Happy Happy (ハッピー・ハッピー Happī Happī)

- Performed by Megumi Hayashibara (ED)

=== English version ===
Never keep a good Duck down

- Performed by Alan Carr, Russell Shaw (OP)

Alfred Song

- Performed by Alan Carr (ED)
