= Babette van Veen =

Dutch actress and singer (born 1968)

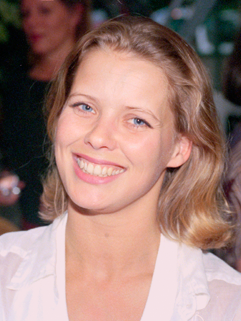
- Van Veen in 1994
- Born: 30 April 1968 (age 58); Utrecht, Netherlands
- Occupations: Actress; Singer

Babette van Veen (born 30 April 1968) is a Dutch actress and singer. She is known for her role as Linda Dekker in the soap opera Goede tijden, slechte tijden.

== Career ==
In 1989, Van Veen made her film debut in the film Blueberry Hill by Belgian film director Robbe De Hert. She also appeared in the 1995 film Brylcream Boulevard and the 1999 film Nachtvlinder.

Van Veen and the West Coast Big Band from The Hague, Netherlands released the album Winter in 2005. She released the album Vertrouwelijk in 2009.

She played the role of Linda Dekker in the soap opera Goede tijden, slechte tijden from 1990 to 1998 and again in 2005 and 2006 and from 2015 to 2021. Van Veen, Guusje Nederhorst and Katja Schuurman performed as the singing group Linda, Roos & Jessica in the 1990s. The group scored a number one hit with the song Ademnood. The group's name consists of the names of their characters in the soap opera Goede tijden, slechte tijden. The group performed their last concert in 1998. Van Veen also played a role in the Belgian soap opera Familie.

Van Veen competed in the second season of the Dutch television series The Masked Singer. In 2021, she appeared in an episode of the television series Het Jachtseizoen. In that same year, Van Veen and Joep Sertons were fired from the soap opera Goede tijden, slechte tijden to reduce the size of the cast. Sertons played her husband in the soap opera.

In 2022, Van Veen appeared in the second season of the television game show De Verraders. She also appeared in the photography game show Het Perfecte Plaatje. In June 2022, she announced her return to the soap opera Goede tijden, slechte tijden.

In 2024, she plays a role in the war musical 40-45. Van Veen and Katja Schuurman released the song Fout Feestje in 2025. They also performed the song Ademnood at the 2025 Gouden Televizier-Ring Gala.

== Politics ==
She was on the party list for the Party for the Animals in the 2014 European Parliament election. She was also on the party list for that same party in the 2017 Dutch general election and the 2021 Dutch general election.

== Personal life ==
Her father is Dutch stage performer Herman van Veen.

Van Veen had a relationship with Flemish singer Koen Wauters early in the 1990s. Van Veen married Dutch television presenter Bas Westerweel in 1998. They announced their divorce in November 2010. They have two sons.

== Discography ==
- Winter (2005, with the West Coast Big Band)
- Vertrouwelijk (2009)

== Selected filmography ==
=== Film ===
- Blueberry Hill (1989)
- Brylcream Boulevard (1995)
- Nachtvlinder (1999)

=== Television ===
- Goede tijden, slechte tijden (1990 – 1998, 2005 – 2006, 2015 – 2021, 2022 – present)
- Familie (1994 – 1995)

=== As contestant ===
- Dancing on Ice (2006)
- Sterren Dansen Op Het IJs (2011)
- De Jongens tegen de Meisjes (2012)
- The Masked Singer (2020)
- Het Jachtseizoen (2021)
- De Verraders (2022)
- Het Perfecte Plaatje (2022)

=== As presenter ===
- MAX PubQuiz (2023, co-host with host Sybrand Niessen)
