= Harry Sacksioni =

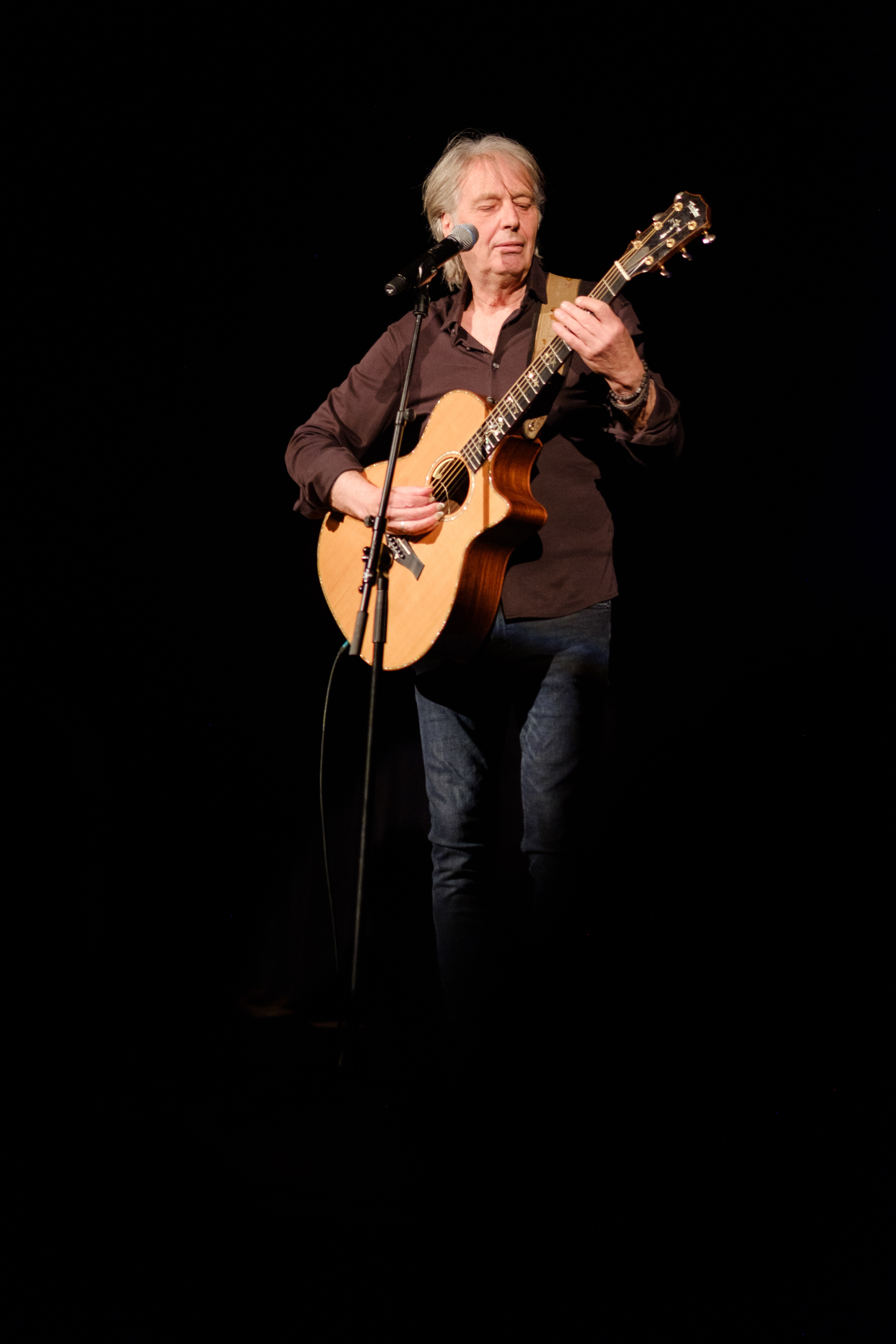

Background information
- Born: Harry Sacksioni; 23 October 1950 (age 75)
- Origin: Amsterdam, Netherlands
- Genres: Folk, instrumental, pop
- Instrument: Guitar
- Years active: 1968–present
- Labels: Harlekijn, Philips, Vertigo, Polydor, Mercury, State of Mind, Cutaway
- Website: www.harrysacksioni.nl

Harry Sacksioni (born 23 October 1950, in Amsterdam) is a composer and guitar virtuoso of Dutch origin. The peak of his fame was during the 1970s to 1990s. Famous works of this period include Meta Sequoia, Vensters and Elixer, along with re-arrangements of existing pieces, such as Anji (Davy Graham), Scarborough Fair (arr. Paul Simon) and I Wish (Stevie Wonder). Sacksioni's work is mainly instrumental, although some tracks during the 1980s provided guitar accompaniments to vocals provided by himself and Raymond van het Groenewoud.

Sacksioni was one of the artists who recorded the song Shalom from Holland (written by Simon Hammelburg and Ron Klipstein) as a token of solidarity to the Israeli people, threatened by missiles from Iraq, during the first Gulf War in 1991.

Sacksioni's work is not commercially motivated, and as a result, he is not often featured in the mainstream media. His records appear under an independent, privately owned label Katowee (from cutaway, a feature of some guitars) as a protest against the high prices of CDs.

Sacksioni uses various guitars during a live concert. When touring, he chooses instruments from his collection of acoustic and electric guitars to suit the venue and programme. He plays both 6 and 12-string guitars, both acoustic and electric. An unusual guitar of his is a hand-built double guitar: one half is electric and the other half is acoustic.

Sacksioni has been living in Lienden, Netherlands, since the 1980s. Before that, he lived in Amsterdam.

Harry Sacksioni was made a Knight of the Order of Orange-Nassau, decorated by Klaas Tammes, mayor of the municipality of Buren, during a concert in the Agnietenhof in Tiel on 9 May 2009. On his 60th birthday, Harry was given a tribute concert by a number of musical colleagues in the famous Amsterdam venue Carré.

== Major collaborations ==
- Frank Boeijen
- Raymond van het Groenewoud
- Digmon Roovers
- Herman van Veen
- Erik van der Wurff
- John May

== Discography ==
=== Studio albums ===
Harry Sacksioni: gitaar

- Released: 1975
- Format: LP, MC
- Label: Harlekijn Holland
- Producer: Rob Chrispijn

Vensters

- Released: 1976
- Format: LP, MC
- Label: Harlekijn Holland
- Producer: Harry Sacksioni, Erik van der Wurff

Om de hoek

- Released: 1978
- Format: LP, MC
- Label: Harlekijn Holland
- Producer: Adriaan Verstijnen, Harry Sacksioni

Live in Amsterdam

- Released: 1978
- Format: LP, MC
- Label: Polydor / Harlekijn Holland
- Producer: Adriaan Verstijnen, Harry Sacksioni

Het dubbelleven van Holle Vijnman

- Released: 1980
- Format: LP, MC
- Label: Harlekijn Holland
- Producer: Adriaan Verstijnen, Harry Sacksioni

Das Doppelleben von Holle Feinmann

- Released: 1980
- Format: LP, MC
- Label: Polydor
- Producer: Adriaan Verstijnen, Harry Sacksioni

Strikt persoonlijk

- Released: 1981
- Format: LP, MC
- Label: Harlekijn Holland
- Producer: Adriaan Verstijnen, Harry Sacksioni, Rob Chrispijn

Ganz persönlich

- Released: 1981
- Format: LP, MC
- Label: Polydor / Harlekijn Holland
- Producer: Adriaan Verstijnen, Harry Sacksioni, Rob Chrispijn

Nachtjournaal

- Released: 1984
- Format: LP, MC
- Label: Polydor
- Producer: Harry Sacksioni, Hans Visser

Spätnachrichten

- Released: 1984
- Format: LP, MC
- Label: Polydor
- Producer: Harry Sacksioni, Hans Visser

Amice

- Released: 1985
- Format: LP, CD
- Label: Philips
- Producer: Jurre Haanstra

Alter Ego

- Released: 1990
- Format: CD
- Label: Phonogram Records
- Producer: Harry Sacksioni

Who's Pulling the Strings

- Released: 1993
- Format: CD
- Label: Mercury Records / Phonogram Records
- Producer: Michiel Hoogenboezem, Harry Sacksioni

Piste

- Released: 1998
- Format: CD
- Label: State of Mind
- Producer: Harry Sacksioni

Oorsprong

- Released: 1998 / 2001 (re-release)
- Format: CD
- Label: State of Mind (1998) / Katowee Holland State of Mind (2001)
- Producer: Harry Sacksioni

Tijdgeest

- Released: 2009
- Format: CD
- Label: Katowee Holland
- Producer: Harry Sacksioni

Adrenaline

- Released: 2010
- Format: CD
- Label: Katowee Holland
- Producer: Harry Sacksioni

While my guitar gently weeps

- Released: 2012
- Format: CD
- Label: Katowee Holland
- Producer: Harry Sacksioni

Vijfenzestig

- Released: 2015
- Format: CD
- Label: Katowee Holland
- Producer: Harry Sacksioni

Once Upon a Time...

- Released: 2017
- Format: CD
- Label: Cutaway Lienden
- Producer: Harry Sacksioni

Love of my life

- Released: 2024
- Format: CD
- Label: Cutaway Lienden

=== Live albums ===
Live in Amsterdam

- Released: 1980
- Format: LP, MC
- Label: Harlekijn Holland
- Producer: Harry Sacksioni, Adriaan Verstijnen

Optima Forma - Live

- Released: 1987 / 1996 (re-release)
- Format: LP, CD
- Label: Vertigo Records / Phonogram Records (1987) / Spectrum Music / Karusell (1996)
- Producer: Harry Sacksioni

Helden - Live

- Released: 2001
- Format: CD
- Label: Cutaway
- Producer: Harry Sacksioni

The Five Great Guitars - Live

- Released: 2003
- Format: CD
- Label: Cutaway / Warriors
- Producer: Harry Sacksioni

CITY! - Live in Concert

- Released: 2006
- Format: CD
- Label: Cutaway
- Producer: Harry Sacksioni

=== Compilations ===
Gitaren

- Released: 1982
- Format: LP
- Label: Polydor

Music for the Millions: Harry Sacksioni

- Released: 1983
- Format: LP, MC
- Label: Polydor

Harry Sacksioni

- Released: 1987
- Format: CD
- Label: Polydor

Romantic Gala

- Released: 1988
- Format: CD
- Label: CNR/DINO

The Collection

- Released: 1995
- Format: CD
- Label: Polydor

Who's Pulling the Strings / Intimate Strangers

- Released: 1995
- Format: CD
- Label: Mercury Records / Phonogram Records

3 Originals - Harry Sacksioni

- Released: 2001
- Format: CD
- Label: Polydor

=== Singles ===
- Het dubbelleven van Holle Vijnman / Prikklok 07.45 uur (1979)
- Herman van Veen, Erik van der Wurff & Harry Sacksioni (1981)
- Suikerspin / Marco Polo (1981)
- Nachtjournaal / Escapade (1984)
- Je moet eerst vliegen / De telganger (1985)
- Paddentrek / Yeti (1987)
- Alter Ego / Bath Blues (1990)
- Fuerteventura / Arena (1994)
- The Killy Killy Song (1994)
- Jessica / Masai Mara (1994)
- Meta Sequoia / Axel F.: Toerist (1998)
- De paddentrek (2008)
