= Cheese (novel) =

Novella by Willem Elsschot

Kaas (Cheese)
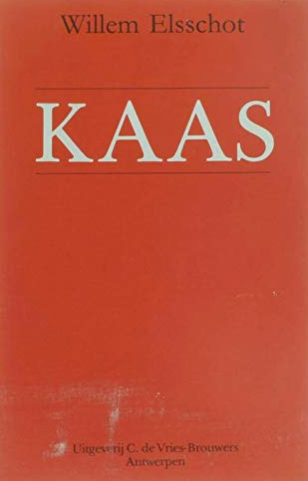
- Author: Willem Elsschot
- Language: Dutch
- Publication date: 1933
- Publication place: Belgium
- ISBN: 9789025363758

Cheese (Dutch: Kaas) is a novella from 1933 written by Willem Elsschot. It is a classic in the Flemish literature, and the most translated Flemish novel of all time (at least 30 translations).

== Contents ==
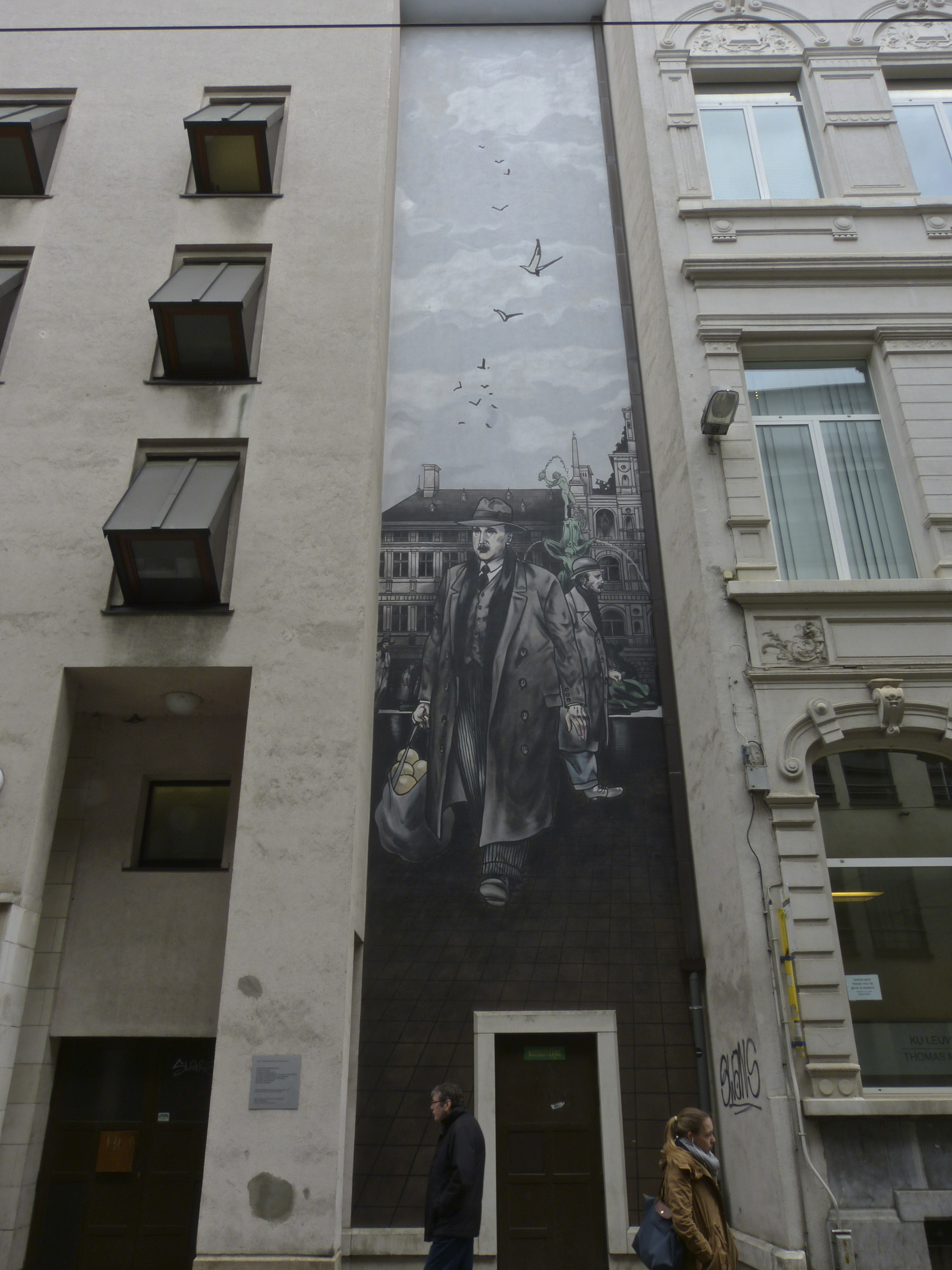
Comic book wall, Laarmans in Antwerp. based on the comic book version by Dick Matena of Cheese

The story is about Frans Laarmans, a clerk at the General Marine and Shipbuilding Company in Antwerp. Van Schoonbeke, the wealthy friend of his brother Karel (who is a general practitioner) offers him a job. Laarmans is tempted to become a wholesaler in Dutch cheese, more specifically full-fat Edam cheese, partly to earn more respect in the circles in which he has accidentally ended up and where he feels out of place because he cannot measure himself with the well-to-do and somewhat snobbish members of the party. With the help of his brother and on the advice of his wife, he manages to get temporary (and unpaid) sick leave from his job as a clerk at the shipyard where he works, under the excuse that he is suffering from a nervous illness.

Laarmans dedicates himself fervently to his task, but is so carried away by his new job as a merchant that he is initially only concerned with the organization and furnishing of his 'office', the purchase of a suitable desk, a typewriter and a telephone, design of his stationery, the recruitment of agents in his district, which consists of Belgium and the Grand Duchy of Luxembourg, the naming of the company (it ends up being "Gafpa", which stands for 'General Antwerp Feeding Products Association') that he loses sight of his real task. When his first shipment of 20 tons of cheese arrives from the supplier Hornstra from Amsterdam, he doesn't really know what to do with it. In the meantime, his name as a merchant has become a guarantee for his position in the higher circles of his friend Van Schoonbeke, where he is treated with more respect afterwards.

In practice, however, Laarmans is not suited for his work and proves unable to sell even the smallest quantity of cheese (a product he himself detests). His hired agents turn out to be mostly non-valeurs and the enormous quantity of Edam cheese, stored in the Blauwhoedenveem, hardly wants to diminish. His wife suffers from the whole process and his children also have a hard time, although they do their best to support their father. His colleagues from the shipyard sometimes visit him to see how he is doing. So he has to be constantly careful not to bump into any of his colleagues when he is walking down the street with his balls of cheese (as he is supposed to be ill, not have a cheese store).

Eventually, he gives up his merchant business, having sold only a few balls of cheese. He returns to the shipyard in his old job as a simple clerk, where he is welcomed with open arms by his old colleagues.

Laarman's wife eventually ensures that there will be no more cheese on the table for the time being.

The character known as Frans Laarmans plays a leading role in the novel Lijmen/Het Been. He is also Elsschot's alter ego in a number of other works.

== Adaptations ==
- In 1999 Orlow Seunke directed a film based on the novel.
- In 2008 Dick Matena adapted the novel into a graphic novel. A mural painting depicting a scene from his adaptation can be seen in the Korte Nieuwstraat in Antwerp, since 9 July 2008.
