= Elsschot =

Elsschot may refer to:

- Willem Elsschot (1882–1960), a Flemish writer and poet
- 6309 Elsschot, an asteroid named after the writer
