= Nachtvlinder =

1999 film

- Theatrical release poster
- Directed by: Herman van Veen
- Written by: Herman van Veen
- Produced by: Ron van Eeden
- Starring: Herman van Veen
- Cinematography: Jan van den Nieuwenhuyzen
- Edited by: Gert-Jan de Vries
- Music by: Nard Rejinders
- Production company: Harlekijn Holland
- Distributed by: Universal Pictures Benelux
- Release date: 2 September 1999
- Running time: 92 minutes
- Country: Netherlands
- Language: Dutch

Nachtvlinder is a 1999 Dutch family film directed by Herman van Veen. It was van Veen's second feature film, after 1979's Uit Elkaar. The film, done on a small budget, struggled with negative reviews.

== Cast ==
- Arthur Kristel as Prins Ruben
- Babette van Veen as Sarah Mogèn
- Ramses Shaffy as Walko van Haland
- Hans Trentelman as Onorg
- Fred Delfgaauw as Koning Olaf van Haland
- Maike Meijer as Jonkvrouw Hinde Baldon
- Jules Croiset as Abraham Mogèn
- Karin Bloemen as Geertrui Moens
- Herman van Veen as Wogram
- Frits Lambrechts as Stuurman
- Niels Reijnders as Martijn
- Sarah de Wit as Alma Mogèn
- Lori Spee as Moeder Mogèn
