= Spijt =

Poem by Willem Elsschot

"Spijt" ("Regret") is a poem by Flemish poet Willem Elsschot. First published in 1934, the poem was reprinted in his 1957 collected works without the final verse paragraph, which contains a possibly controversial term for "woman". The poem, which expresses the guilt and desperate love felt too late by a son for the now-dead mother, is one of Elsschot's best-known works. The last line of the sometimes-omitted paragraph, "Dient het wijf dat moeder heet" ("Serve the woman known as mother"), has become an oft-cited phrase in Dutch to suggest the difficulty of serving and even portraying motherhood.
