= Toto (gorilla) =

Circus animal (1931–1968)

- Other name: M'Toto ("Little Child" in Swahili)
- Species: Western lowland gorilla
- Sex: Female
- Born: 1931
- Died: 1968 (aged 36–37)
- Resting place: "Sandy Lane" Kennels Pet Cemetery, Sarasota, Florida
- Parent: Gargantua (gorilla)
- Weight: 400 lb (180 kg)

Toto (1931–1968) (a.k.a. M'Toto meaning "Little Child" in Swahili) was a gorilla that was adopted and raised very much like a human child.

== Early life ==
A. Maria Hoyt adopted the baby female gorilla orphaned by a hunt in French Equatorial Africa in 1931. Mrs. Hoyt's husband killed the baby gorilla's father for a museum piece for the American Museum of Natural History in New York City. In Maria Hoyt's book, Toto & I (Lippincott 1941), she recounts the horror she and her husband Kenneth felt as they watched the bushmen use nets, swarm over the remaining gorillas and kill them with spears, slaughtering them before their eyes. Instead of one large male killed by Hoyt's shot, eight gorillas had been killed by bushmen who prized gorilla meat. Only a baby gorilla survived, full of fight and fury and was presented to a shocked Maria Hoyt as a gift by the chief, "too small to eat." On Page 17 of her book, Mrs. Hoyt describes trying to quiet the baby gorilla and it finally settled responding to her murmurs to comfort her. The infant remained in her arms as they made their way back to the boats. She continued to hold M'Toto close. That name, which is the Swahili word meaning baby, remained with her for the decades after. "It didn't occur to me in that moment what endless problems I was taking on for the years to come. I was simply responding to the call of a helpless baby, left orphaned and alone in the midst of the African jungle by the blood-thirsty rapacity of men." Mrs. Hoyt moved to Havana Cuba to provide a more tropical home for Toto at the suggestion of a physician who had successfully treated the baby gorilla for pneumonia when the Hoyt's returned to Paris after their safari. M'Toto thrived in Cuba. At the age of four or five, Toto adopted a kitten named Principe, gently carrying the kitten with her everywhere.

== Circus ==
When Toto became too difficult to manage for her private keeper, Jose Tomas, she was leased to the Ringling Brothers and Barnum and Bailey Circus as a potential mate for another gorilla, Gargantua, a.k.a. Buddy.

== Death ==
Toto died in 1968. Toto is buried at "Sandy Lane" Kennels Pet Cemetery in Sarasota, Florida.

== See also ==
- List of individual apes
