= Bayside, Wisconsin =

Village in Milwaukee and Ozaukee counties, Wisconsin

- Village
- Location of Bayside in Milwaukee and Ozaukee Counties, Wisconsin.

- Location in Wisconsin Bayside (the United States) Bayside (North America)
- Coordinates: 43°10′49″N 87°54′17″W
- Country: United States
- State: Wisconsin
- Counties: Milwaukee, Ozaukee
- Incorporated: February 13, 1953; 73 years ago

Area
  - Total: 2.39 sq mi (6.19 km^{2})
  - Land: 2.39 sq mi (6.19 km^{2})
  - Water: 0 sq mi (0.00 km^{2})
- Elevation: 673 ft (205 m)

Population (2020)
  - Total: 4,482
  - Estimate (2021): 4,421
  - Density: 1,814.7/sq mi (700.66/km^{2})
- Time zone: UTC-6 (Central (CST))
  - Summer (DST): UTC-5 (CDT)
- ZIP code: 53217
- Area code: 414
- FIPS code: 55-05450
- GNIS feature ID: 1561327
- Website: baysidewi.gov

Bayside is a village in Milwaukee and Ozaukee counties in the U.S. state of Wisconsin. The population was 4,482 at the 2020 census. Of this, 4,378 were in Milwaukee County, and only 104 were in Ozaukee County.

== Geography ==
Bayside is located at 43°10′49″N 87°54′17″W (43.180275, -87.904735).

According to the United States Census Bureau, the village has a total area of 2.39 square miles (6.19 km^{2}), all land. Lake Michigan borders the eastern edge of Bayside. Most of the village is in Milwaukee County, but a small portion at the end of Lake Drive bordering Fish Creek is in Ozaukee County.

== History ==
The land that became Bayside was originally inhabited by Native Americans, who surrendered their land to the United States Federal Government in the 1830s. However, it is possible that the Potawatomi Chief Waubeka maintained a summer camp in Bayside and a winter camp in the Ozaukee County community that bears his name as late as 1845.

In the 19th century, the community was part of the Town of Milwaukee, and most of the land was used for logging and then farming by the early Dutch-American settlers.

In 1885, the Uihlein family, which owned the Joseph Schlitz Brewing Company, began purchasing land in Bayside, which became Nine Mile Farm, where the company bred draft horses for the brewery. The Uihlein family also kept chickens and cows on the property, and began reforesting the area around 1910. In 1969, the Schlitz Foundation considered getting rid of the land, which caused a debate in Bayside over whether it should become a public space or private developments. In 1971, the foundation donated the land to the National Audubon Society to create a nature center, which today is the 185-acre Schlitz Audubon Nature Center.

In the 1890s and early 20th century, prominent Milwaukeeans, including Jacob Donges and Frederick Usinger, began to construct summer homes in the "Fairy Chasm" community near Lake Michigan. The Fish Creek Park Company, organized in 1892, was one group that built vacation homes in Ozaukee County portion of what would become Bayside.

Bayside grew rapidly during the post-war suburbanization and economic prosperity. Many of the homes in the village were constructed between 1950 and 1980. The village incorporated on February 13, 1953, to prevent annexation by the City of Milwaukee, as happened to other communities in the county, including the Town of Milwaukee and the Town of Granville. In 1955, some of the residents of the Fairy Chasm community in Ozaukee County petitioned to join Bayside. The southern part joined the village, while the northern portion became part of the City of Mequon.

== Education ==
The Milwaukee County portion of the municipality is in the Fox Point Joint No. 2 School District (elementary) and the Nicolet Union High School District. The Fox Point-Bayside School District operates Stormonth Elementary and Bayside Middle schools. Nicolet High School in Glendale serves all students residing in the Milwaukee County part of Bayside.

The Ozaukee County portion is in the Mequon-Thiensville School District.

== Government ==
The village of Bayside is served by its own police department but contracts out its fire fighting and EMS services to the North Shore Fire Department.

== Demographics ==
Historical population
Census	Pop.	Note	%±
1960	3,181		—
1970	4,461		40.2%
1980	4,724		5.9%
1990	4,789		1.4%
2000	4,518		−5.7%
2010	4,389		−2.9%
2020	4,482		2.1%
2021 (est.)	4,421	▼	−1.4%
U.S. Decennial Census

=== 2010 census ===
As of the census of 2010, there were 4,389 people, 1,831 households, and 1,281 families living in the village. The population density was 1,836.4 inhabitants per square mile (709.0/km^{2}). There were 1,945 housing units at an average density of 813.8 units per square mile (314.2 units/km^{2}). The racial makeup of the village was 90.7% White, 3.3% African American, 0.3% Native American, 3.7% Asian, 0.1% Pacific Islander, 0.5% from other races, and 1.4% from two or more races. Hispanic or Latino of any race were 2.8% of the population.

There were 1,831 households, of which 29.9% had children under the age of 18 living with them, 62.4% were married couples living together, 6.1% had a female householder with no husband present, 1.5% had a male householder with no wife present, and 30.0% were non-families. 26.3% of all households were made up of individuals, and 14.7% had someone living alone who was 65 years of age or older. The average household size was 2.38 and the average family size was 2.89.

The median age in the village was 48 years. 23.5% of residents were under the age of 18; 3.6% were between the ages of 18 and 24; 18.5% were from 25 to 44; 33.6% were from 45 to 64; and 20.8% were 65 years of age or older. The gender makeup of the village was 46.9% male and 53.1% female.

=== 2000 census ===
As of the census of 2000, there were 4,518 people, 1,769 households, and 1,326 families living in the village. The population density was 1,898.7 people per square mile (733.1 people/km^{2}). There were 1,834 housing units at an average density of 770.8 units per square mile (297.6 units/km^{2}). The racial makeup of the village was 94.36% White, 2.77% African American, 0.15% Native American, 1.81% Asian, 0.09% Pacific Islander, 0.31% from other races, and 0.51% from two or more races. Hispanic or Latino of any race were 1.70% of the population.

There were 1,769 households, out of which 31.5% had children under the age of 18 living with them, 67.3% were married couples living together, 5.4% had a female householder with no husband present, and 25.0% were non-families. 22.8% of all households were made up of individuals, and 10.5% had someone living alone who was 65 years of age or older. The average household size was 2.46 and the average family size was 2.89.

In the village, the population was spread out, with 23.2% under the age of 18, 3.9% from 18 to 24, 20.0% from 25 to 44, 32.2% from 45 to 64, and 20.6% who were 65 years of age or older. The median age was 46 years. For every 100 females, there were 91.3 males. For every 100 females age 18 and over, there were 88.4 males.

The median income for a household in the village was $88,982, and the median income for a family was $104,771. Males had a median income of $74,722 versus $41,935 for females. The per capita income for the village was $49,357. About 3.0% of families and 2.9% of the population were below the poverty line, including 3.9% of those under age 18 and 0.7% of those age 65 or over.

== Notable people ==
- Gaston Vandermeerssche, leader of the Dutch resistance, World War II
- Mark Metcalf, actor who played Doug Neidermeyer in Animal House
