= Gertrude Lintz =

English-American socialite known for keeping exotic animals

Gertrude Davies Lintz
- Born: April 1880; Islington, England, United Kingdom
- Died: August 1968 (aged 88)
- Known for: Raising apes in her Brooklyn home
- Spouse: Dr Bill Lintz

Gertrude Ada Davies Lintz (1880 – 1968) was an English-American dog breeder and socialite known for keeping exotic animals, including chimpanzees and gorillas, in her Brooklyn home. Her gorilla Buddy was sold to a circus and renamed Gargantua. Her gorilla Massa was sold to the Philadelphia Zoo, eventually becoming the longest-living documented gorilla. Her 1942 memoir Animals Are My Hobby inspired the 1997 American film Buddy. Lintz was played by Rene Russo in the film.

== Biography ==
According to her memoir, Lintz was born in England to John Henry Davies and his wife. The family was of Welsh descent and had 13 children. After spending much of his income unwisely, her father moved the family to the United States when she was young. In 1914 she married physician William "Bill" Lintz (15 July 1883 – 1 September 1969). They lived at 8365 Shore Road in Bay Ridge, Brooklyn, New York City, a waterfront "brownstone stoop of a mansion of faded grandeur straight out of Charles Addams' macabre cartoons" according to circus executive Henry Ringling North.

On 21 February 1925 her St. Bernard, CH Hercuveen Aurora Borealis, became the first of her breed to win an All-Breed Best in Show at the Maryland Kennel Club's twelfth annual dog show in Baltimore, Maryland.

Lintz later became known as an eccentric exotic animal collector. She owned two gorillas, Gargantua (called Buddy at that time) and Massa. She was known to drive around Brooklyn with a fully clothed gorilla or chimpanzee sitting in the passenger seat. She treated them as her children, including dressing them and teaching them to eat at the table with cutlery. Buddy/Gargantua later became a major circus attraction after being sold to The Ringling Bros. and Barnum & Bailey Circus in 1937. He had been frightened by a thunder storm and, having escaped from his cage, climbed into bed with his "mother", Lintz. Massa was sold to the Philadelphia Zoo in 1935 after he attacked Lintz, who had accidentally startled him. He became the oldest gorilla on record at 54 years old and his story, with elements of Gargantua's life, was fictionalized and made into the film Buddy (1997).

One of her chimpanzees, Captain Jiggs, also became a well-known national figure, but in 1938 he escaped and was shot and killed by police. Lintz claimed to have taught another chimpanzee, Suzabella or Suzy, to talk and demonstrated this on the radio. The only words spoken by the chimp were "Who-who". Suzy died in adolescence, and her body was shipped to Harvard's Peabody Museum, where it has been used in evolutionary research.
