= Brylcream Boulevard =

1995 film

- Theatrical release poster
- Directed by: Robbe De Hert
- Written by: Robbe De Hert; Walter Van Den Broeck
- Distributed by: Shooting Star Film Distribution
- Release date: 26 October 1995
- Running time: 95 minutes
- Country: Belgium
- Language: Dutch

Brylcream Boulevard is a 1995 Belgo Dutch comedy film which was directed by Robbe De Hert.

== Cast ==
- Michael Pas as Robin De Hert
- Frank Aendenboom as Joris Verbiest
- Babette van Veen as Kathy Van Bloemendael
- Hilde Heijnen as Jeanine
- Gert-Jan Dröge as Johan de Pauw
- Koen Onghena as Blondy
- Oliver Windross as Rudy
- Bart Slegers as Felix Zakowski
- Stijn Meuris as Bernard
- Eric Clerckx as Stafke
- Patje de Neve as Perre
- Ernst Löw as Jean Pierre de Bie
- Blanka Heirman as Alice de Hert
- Jaak Van Assche as Lou de Hert
- Piet Balfoort as Minister
