= Lijmen/Het Been =

2001 film by Robbe De Hert

- Theatrical release poster
- Directed by: Robbe De Hert
- Written by: Willem Elsschot (novel); Robbe De Hert; Fernand Auwera; Ruud Den Dryver
- Produced by: Ruud Den Dryver; Michel Houdmont; Frank Jansen
- Starring: Koen De Bouw; Mike Verdrengh; Willeke van Ammelrooy; Sylvia Kristel
- Cinematography: Piotr Kukla
- Edited by: Wim Louwrier
- Music by: Joan Berkhemer; Lodewijk De Boer
- Distributed by: A-Film Distribution
- Release date: 18 January 2001 (Netherlands)
- Running time: 110 minutes
- Countries: Belgium; Netherlands
- Language: Dutch

Lijmen/Het Been is a 2001 Belgian crime film adapted from short stories by Willem Elsschot and directed by Robbe De Hert, starring Mike Verdrengh and Koen De Bouw. The movie was coproduced by Belgian and Dutch film companies.

== Background ==
The film is based upon two books of Willem Elsschot: "Lijmen" and "Het Been".

- "Lijmen" means "to convince" or "to win over". The book was released in 1923.
- "Het Been" means "the leg". It is the sequel of "Lijmen" and was released in 1938.

== Plot ==
The film is set around 1938. During an auction, Mr. Boormans is put into a psychiatric hospital after he bid 32,000 Belgian francs for a worthless piece of paper. Frans Laarmans visits the psychiatrists claiming Boormans is not crazy and there is a story behind the bid.

When Laarmans's mother dies, the family decides that Frank should pay for the embalming of her corpse. As he does not have the money, Laarmans visits Boormans, who is the publisher of the World Magazine for Finance, Trade, Industry, Art and Science, a publication Boormans claims is sold worldwide and translated into many languages. He represents it as a reputable consumers' journal, comparing different companies in the same industry. Boormans informs Laarmans that, by coincidence, the next edition is about the funeral and undertaking industry.

Boormans visits the undertakers and a deal whereby his company will be featured in the magazine. The offer comes with two conditions, namely that in addition to the normal print and distribution, the undertaker must order a large number of copies for own purposes, and that the purchase of the magazines will be at a significant discount if the undertaker in turn gives Laarmans a discount for the embalming services. The undertaker agrees.

Boormans, who is looking for a new assistant, hires Laarmans and sends him out in search for new customers. Mrs. Lauwereyssen, the owner of a business in elevators, is interested. In addition to the copies of the magazine distributed by Boormans, she agrees to purchase a further 100,000 copies for own purposes.

Laarmans then finds out the "World Magazine" is a fraud, in that the magazine is not distributed to the public, but only the copies purchased by the featured company exist. The magazine does not have any subscribers and is, in effect, merely an expensive advertising brochure using unproven figures and fake competitors. Only the information of the customer is "valid", although it too is also based upon lies and twisted figures.

It turns out Mrs Lauwereyssen only placed the order as her company is almost bankrupt. She now hopes to become an international awarded entrepreneur. The extra money she is about to earn will be used for acute surgery on her infected leg. Laarmans feels sorry for Mrs Lauwereyssen and tries to convince her not to sign the contract or to reduce the amount of obliged prints, but is not able to convince her. Later he speaks with Boormans in an attempt to void the contract or to reduce the price and Boormans agrees that Mrs Lauwereyssen can pay the invoice on 12 month terms. In meantime Mrs Lauwereyssen is aware she has been swindled. She is so upset she refuses to pay last instalment.

Some time later, Boormans and Laarmans meet Mrs Lauwereyssen at the market. Her leg has been amputated. Boormans feels remorse and makes up tells her there has been a calculation error and offers 32,000 Belgian francs as a credit note. However, Mrs Lauwereyssen does not want to take the money. A dismayed Boormans decides to give the money to Mr Van Kamp, another customer he cheated, and who is now in financial problems. Van Kamp also refuses Boormans money.

Boormans conscience continues to trouble him and he sues Mrs Lauwereyssen in an attempt to force her to take the money. The judge dismisses the case as there is no evidence that Mrs Lauwereyssen paid too much. Some time later the elevator company becomes bankrupt.

When Boormans and Laarmans attend an auction, Boormans, still having moral qualms, bids 32,000 Belgian francs for a worthless piece of paper.

Laarmans resigns and starts a shop selling cheese. He meets Mrs Lauwereyssen who forgives him, as she feels that she should have known the magazine was a fraud. Furthermore, when she signed the contract she knew that her leg was not able to be saved and that an amputation was inevitable.

The film ends when Laarmans meets Boormans in a museum. Boormans intends to talk the curator into taking 1.5 million copies for the next release of the "World Magazine".

== Cast ==
- Koen De Bouw as Frans Laarmans
- Mike Verdrengh as Boorman
- Willeke van Ammelrooy as Mrs Lauwereyssen
- Sylvia Kristel as Jeanne
- Els Beatse as Fine Laarmans
- Lou Landré as Pieter Lauwereyssen
- Hans van den Berg as Van Kamp
- Jan Decleir as judge Teugels
- Jaak Van Assche as Van Ganzen
- Sjarel Branckaerts as auctioner
