= Gargantua (gorilla) =

Circus animal (1929–1949)

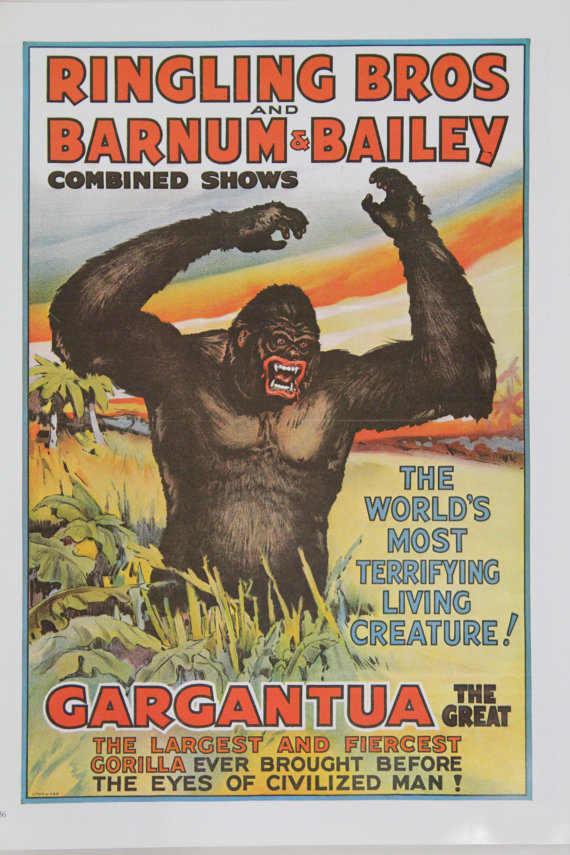
- Frank Buck, star attraction of the Circus, 1938, introduced Gargantua at every performance.
- Other name: Buddy
- Species: western lowland gorilla
- Sex: male
- Born: 1929; Africa
- Died: 1949 (aged 19–20)
- Cause of death: double pneumonia
- Resting place: Peabody Museum
- Known for: Ringling Brothers circus exhibition
- Weight: 550–600 lb (250–270 kg)
- Height: 1.7 m (5 ft 7 in)
- Appearance: nitric scar on face

Gargantua (1929 - November 1949) was a captive western lowland gorilla famed for being exhibited by the Ringling Brothers circus. He has been credited with saving the business from bankruptcy. An acid scar on his face gave Gargantua a snarling, menacing expression, which the circus management exploited by generating publicity falsely exaggerating his purported hatred of humans. He was also claimed to be the largest gorilla in captivity.

Gargantua was captured as a baby in Africa, and was known as "Buddy" for years. After he was sold to Ringling Brothers by his previous owner, Gertrude Lintz, he was renamed, after François Rabelais's giant character, to sound more frightening.

He had a "mate" named Toto, but apparently never showed any interest in her. She was, nevertheless, advertised by the circus as "Mrs. Gargantua".

== Early life ==
Gargantua was born wild in the Belgian Congo in approximately 1929. In the early 1930s, the gorilla was given to a Captain Arthur Phillips as a gift from missionaries in Africa. The captain was fond of him and called him "Buddy". He was kept aboard his freighter and became popular with most of the crew. One sailor, however, drunk and seeking revenge on the captain's strictness, threw nitric acid in Buddy's face. This did not kill the gorilla but the attack almost blinded him, left physical scars, and led to much more aggressive behaviour.

Unable to deal with this aggression, the captain gave Buddy to Gertrude Lintz, a wealthy eccentric who looked after sick animals in Brooklyn. Her husband, Dr. Bill Lintz, diagnosed Buddy with double pneumonia. Gertrude Lintz treated the little gorilla back to health, including chewing his food for him, and along with her kennel-man, Richard "Dick" Kroener, trained and raised Buddy. She cared for Buddy, and other apes, as her children and even arranged for plastic surgery on the scar, leaving Buddy with a permanent sneer. She was known to drive around Brooklyn with Buddy, dressed in clothes, in the passenger seat. The arrangement came to an end one night in 1937 when the 7-year-old, 460 lb (210 kg) Buddy, frightened by thunder, broke out of his cage and climbed into bed with his "mother" for comfort; Gertrude Lintz contacted John Ringling shortly thereafter.

== Circus attraction ==
Ringling bought Buddy from Bill Lintz for a sum less than $10,000 ($ 224,000 in 2025) and renamed him "Gargantua" at his wife's suggestion. The Ringling Bros. and Barnum & Bailey Circus, in financial problems after the Great Depression, heavily advertised their newest attraction. Their extravagant claims included:

- "The Largest Gorilla Ever Exhibited!"
- "The World's Most Terrifying Living Creature!"
- "The Largest and Fiercest Gorilla Ever Brought Before the Eyes of Civilised Man!"
- "The Only Full-Grown Gorilla Ever Seen On This Continent!"

Regardless of the truth of these slogans, Gargantua attracted millions and single-handedly saved the circus.

A special cage was built for Gargantua by the Crane Company. It was air-tight and air conditioned, designed to keep Gargantua in and the spectators' diseases out.

Another source attributes construction of Gargantua's special climate-controlled cage to the Carrier Corporation: "Gargantua's cage, a 20-foot-long (6 m) steel and plate glass climate-controlled box constructed at a cost of $20,000 by the Carrier Corporation, became as celebrated as its occupant, and was paraded around the ring at every performance."

His first public appearance was in April 1938 and was recorded by Time magazine:

Appearing as Display No. 14 on the 26-item program, Gargantua was hauled round & round the Garden in a heavily barred, thickly glassed, air-conditioned wagon drawn by six white horses. Stocky & truculent, he stared menacingly out of his cage, was characterized by Frank Buck as "the most ferocious, most terrifying and most dangerous of all living creatures."

Gargantua's supposed aggression and violence were emphasized in the circus' publicity. For example, Time magazine also wrote this earlier in the same year:

"Gargantua the Great, wrote Gargantuan Columnist Heywood Broun three weeks ago, "is the fiercest looking thing I have ever seen on two legs. And probably his power and truculence were all the more impressive because he did look a good deal like a distant relative. No one was allowed to go close to his cage, because Gargantua can reach about five feet through the bars and get a toe hold on a visitor whom he dislikes." Gargantua may not be the world's biggest captive gorilla—since the death of Berlin Zoo's monster, many zoos have claimed that honor for their gorillas—but he is one of the most vindictive. Last week the circus' executive vice president, young John Ringling North, nephew of the late John ("Three-Ring") Ringling, was inspecting the circus' Sarasota, Fla. winter quarters. Imprudently disregarding warning signs, he leaned against the bars of Gargantua's cage to rest. Gargantua reached through, got no toe hold but wrenched Circusman North's left arm into the cage, bit & wrung it until Trainer Richard Kroner, pounding the gorilla with an iron stake, distracted its slow attention.

In 1941, he was paired with another gorilla, Toto (short for Mitoto or M'Toto), who was advertised as "Mrs. Gargantua". Nothing ever came of the relationship, however, and both lived in separate cages. In May 1942, his trainer since babyhood, Richard Kroener, died. As Kroeners' assistant Julius Gerlick had just been drafted, this left Gargantua to be trained by strangers.

== Death ==
Gargantua died in November 1949 of double pneumonia. A necropsy performed at Johns Hopkins Hospital revealed that Gargantua had been suffering from several conditions at the time of his death, including skin disease and four impacted and rotten wisdom teeth.

His skeleton was donated to the Peabody Museum in 1950, but it is now only displayed on special occasions.

== Physical characteristics ==
Sources report Gargantua's weight variously as 550 to 600 lb (250 to 270 kg). The 7-year-old Gargantua was described as 460 lb (210 kg) when first displayed. His standing height was said to be 1.7 m (5 ft 7 in). Western lowland gorillas usually only reach 440 lb (200 kg) in the wild.

== Legacy ==
The 1997 film Buddy, starring Rene Russo, is very loosely based on the early life of Gargantua/Buddy and another of Gertrude Lintz's gorillas, Massa.

== See also ==
- List of individual apes
