= Whitey (film) =

- Theatrical release poster
- De Witte van Sichem
- Directed by: Robbe De Hert
- Written by: Fernand Auwera; Ernest Claes
- Based on: De Witte by Ernest Claes
- Produced by: Henk Van Soom; Roland Verhavert
- Starring: Eric Clerckx; Willy Vandermeulen; Blanka Heirman; Paul S Jongers
- Cinematography: Theo van de Sande; Walther Vanden Ende
- Edited by: Ton de Graaff
- Music by: Jürgen Knieper
- Release date: 25 March 1980 (Belgium)
- Running time: 108 minutes
- Country: Belgium
- Language: Brabantian dialect

Whitey (Dutch: De Witte van Sichem) is a 1980 Belgian historical drama film by Robbe De Hert released in 1980. The film is an adaptation of Ernest Claes' novel De Witte. It is the second adaptation of the book. The other film was released in 1934 as De Witte. The title Whitey refers to the nickname of the main character: Louis Verheyden, a naughty blond boy of eleven years old.

== Plot ==
The film is set in and around Sichem in 1901. Louis Verheyden, 11 years old, lives with his parents and two brothers on a farm. His mother is an irritable woman who complains a lot. Father works at the farm of landowner Coene. He is mostly home only during dinner. He is a rather aggressive man and frequently beats Louis. Furthermore, Louis is bullied by his brothers Nis and Heinke.

Louis hates school. This is mostly caused by their teacher, a very hard man who likes to punish his pupils. Corporal punishment was not yet forbidden in those days and the children are cuffed on the ears or put into the coal chamber by the teachers.

Louis is a naughty boy. He gives others incorrect directions, tries to haggle of money from his brothers, ties people to their chairs during church service, steals smoking materials from Coene, gives his family members instructions to put salt onto the potatoes (resulting they are salted three times), chases off the Coene's horses, ... Louis is almost caught every time which results in another punishment. His most humiliating punishment was when he went skinny dipping in the river Demer although this was forbidden by his parents. When his mother arrived at the river, Louis hid and his friends tried to deceive the mother by telling her that they had not seen Louis. However, mother found his clothes and took them away. As a result, Louis had to go home naked.

Louis is sent by Coene to Averbode Abbey to deliver a package. There he is impressed by the beautiful interior, the Gregorian singing, the garden full of flowers and the printing establishment.

One day, Louis is again punished by his teacher and put in the cellar. There he finds some books written by Hendrik Conscience. His attention goes to the book De Leeuw van Vlaanderen (translated as 'The Lion of Flanders') and is fascinated by the Battle of the Golden Spurs. Inspired by this battle, he needles up his friends to replay a fight scene. Some injured children run to their home. Their mothers and the local priest come to the battle. Louis, wholly engrossed in his role as warrior Jan Breydel, is not at all aware that he has just started a "sword fight" with the priest.

Desperate, the mother sends Louis and Heinke on a pilgrimage hoping the Lord will turn Louis into a well-behaved boy. They end up in a street fight between the police and supporters of the socialist movement and have to flee into a pub. However, the pub seems to be owned by socialists. Heinke, a catholic, tries to impress the female bartender by telling her that he also supports socialism. Louis thinks this is blasphemy and threatens Heinke with informing on his girlfriend Liza.

It's the annual fair and Louis deceives his brother by telling him his mother has promised to give 15 Belgian Cents. At the fair, Louis meets his mother. Louis complains he has no money, resulting in his getting some more pocket money. Of course, mother finds out Louis was given money twice. His father is furious and demands his son must work for Coene to retrieve the money or be sent to a community home. Meanwhile, two incidents happen: Louis tries to commit suicide in the river Demer whilst Liza ends her relationship with Heinke. The last action ends up in a fight in a spiegeltent where the funfair ball takes place.

The film is then set to 1980 where a blond student, resembling Louis (it is actually actor Eric Clerckx with another haircut), is working in the printing establishment of Averbode Abbay. When he drops a box, he is scolded by his boss. In the box is the 117th reprint of the novel, "Whitey".

== Production ==
While creating Whitey De Hert was influenced by Belgian writer Louis Paul Boon, who recommended that the director approach the source material differently than the 1934 film. He suggested that the movie take a more socially critical view of the source material and show the titular character as someone wishing to escape his surroundings, rather than adopt the farcical tone of the first adaptation. The film marks a change in De Hert's film style, as the movie is made more to mainstream film conventions.

== Release ==
Whitey premiered in Belgium on 25 March 1980. It went on to screen at film festivals in Montreal, Dublin, Berlin, Miami, New Delhi, Moskow, Tel-Aviv and Mannheim.

The film was screened in 2024 at the Ostend Film Festival as part of their "Meet the Masters" series.

== Reception ==
According to Ernest Mathijs, Whitey "broke all domestic box-office records" in Belgium upon release. It was the first of De Hert's films to perform well at theaters and per Gertjan Willems, the movie routinely receives a high viewership when it airs on television.

Bill Cosford of The Miami Herald gave the film three stars, noting that it was "more bitter than sweet" but that "Nonetheless, Whitey is a movie of many small pleasures, filled with gentle humor." Bruce Bailey of The Gazette was more critical, praising the cinematography while criticizing the movie as "little more than a series of anecdotes, culminating in Witte's dramatic expression of pent-up frustration during a county fair."

== Awards ==
- 1980: The film both won the award of the jury and the public's favorite at the journées cinématographiques d'Orleans.
- 1981: Grande Premio "Janela de Prat" Tomar
- 1982: Award of the Jury, the media at the youth international film festival Caen
- 1982: Golden Award Giffoni Film Festival
