= Gaston's War =

1997 Belgian drama film directed by Robbe De Hert

- Theatrical release poster
- Directed by: Robbe De Hert
- Written by: Fernand Auwera, Luc Janssen, Allan Mayer
- Story by: Allan Mayer
- Music by: Theo Nijland
- Distributed by: RCV Film Distribution
- Release date: 23 October 1997
- Running time: 120 minutes
- Countries: Netherlands; Belgium
- Languages: English, Dutch, French

Gaston's War is a Belgian 1997 drama film directed by Robbe De Hert and starring Werner De Smedt, Mapi Galán and Peter Firth. Based on a novel by Allan Mayer, the film is set many decades after the Second World War, and tells the story of a Belgian resistance fighter, Gaston Vandermeerssche, who tries to discover who betrayed them to the Nazis.

The movie was nominated for a Golden Goblet at the 1997 Shanghai International Film Festival.

== Main cast ==
- Werner De Smedt as Gaston Vandermeerssche
- Mapi Galán as Veronique
- Stuart Laing as Harry
- Oliver Windross as Doug
- Peter Firth as Major Smith
- Christian Crahay as Hachez
- Olivia Williams as Nicky
- Lukas Smolders as Louis
- Clive Swift as General James
- Marilou Mermans as Farmer's wife
- René van Asten as Van der Waals
- Sylvia Kristel as Miep Visser
- Stefan Perceval as German soldier
- Gert-Jan Dröge as Cohen
- Serge Marechal as Frenchman
