= Massa (gorilla) =

Gorilla

- Species: Western lowland gorilla
- Sex: Male
- Born: c. 1930; Ghana
- Died: 30 December 1984 (aged 54); Philadelphia Zoo
- Cause of death: Stroke
- Residence: Philadelphia Zoo
- Weight: 400 lb (180 kg)

Massa (c. 1930 – 30 December 1984) was a male western lowland gorilla who reached the age of 54 years. At the time, this was the oldest gorilla ever recorded, though later individuals would eventually surpass that record.

Massa was born in the wild in Ghana. He was shipped to the United States at an early age and his first owner was Brooklyn eccentric Gertrude Lintz. In 1935, after accidentally spilling water on Massa, which startled him and prompted him to attack, Lintz sold him to the Philadelphia Zoo.

In his prime, Massa weighed 400 pounds (180 kg). He remained on display at Philadelphia Zoo up until age 54. Though thin, all-gray, and toothless in his later years, he remained a visitor favorite. He died from a stroke on 30 December 1984, following a special birthday party held by the zoo, complete with a special cake and a live dixieland band. He was buried within the grounds of the zoo.

== In popular culture ==
The 1997 film Buddy was based on the life of Massa (with some elements from the life of another of Lintz's gorillas, Gargantua, who was known at the time as Buddy).

== See also ==
- Buddy (1997 film)
- Oldest hominids
- List of individual apes

Preceded by ?	World's oldest living Gorilla ? – December 30, 1984	Succeeded by Jenny
