= Rene Russo =

American actress and model (born 1954)

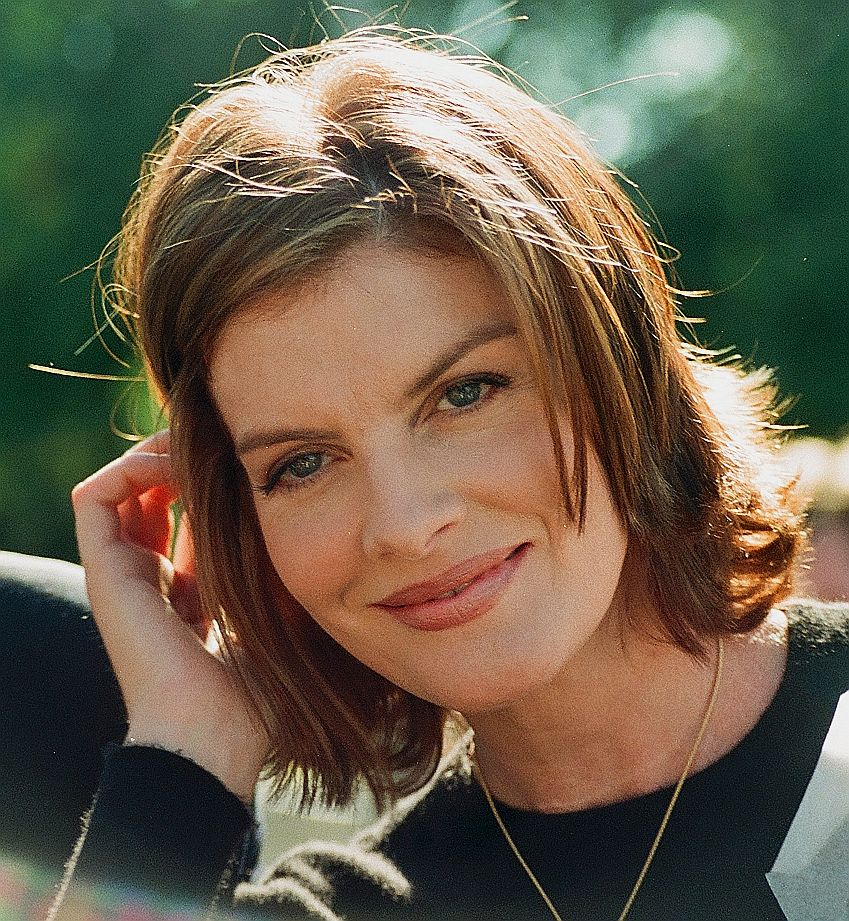
- Russo in 1996
- Born: Rene Marie Russo; February 17, 1954 (age 72); Burbank, California, U.S.
- Occupations: Actress, model
- Years active: 1972–2005; 2010–present
- Spouse: Dan Gilroy (m. 1992)
- Children: 1
- Relatives: Frank D. Gilroy (father-in-law)

Rene Marie Russo (born February 17, 1954) is an American actress and model. She began her career as a fashion model in the 1970s, appearing on magazine covers such as Vogue and Cosmopolitan. She made her film debut in the 1989 comedy Major League, and rose to international prominence in a number of thrillers and action films throughout the 1990s, including Lethal Weapon 3 (1992), In the Line of Fire (1993), Outbreak (1995), Get Shorty (1995), Ransom (1996), Lethal Weapon 4 (1998), and The Thomas Crown Affair (1999).

After headlining the family comedy Yours, Mine & Ours (2005), Russo took a five-year break from acting. She returned to the screen as Frigga, the mother of the titular hero, in the Marvel Cinematic Universe film Thor (2011), a role she reprised in Thor: The Dark World (2013) and Avengers: Endgame (2019). In 2014, Russo starred in the acclaimed crime thriller Nightcrawler, for which she won the Saturn Award for Best Supporting Actress and was nominated for the BAFTA Award for Best Actress in a Supporting Role. She has also appeared in The Intern (2015), Just Getting Started (2017), and Velvet Buzzsaw (2019).

== Early life and education ==
Russo was born in 1954 in Burbank, California, to Shirley (née Balocca) (1926–1998), a factory worker and barmaid, and Nino Russo (1922–1999), a sculptor and car mechanic who left the family when Russo was two. Russo has Italian ancestry. Russo grew up with her mother and her sister and attended Burroughs High School. She was afflicted with scoliosis and had to wear a full-torso brace. Her height also earned her the nickname "Jolly Green Giant" from her classmates. In a 2019 interview with Financial Times, she indeed described herself as a "geek", and admitted that the bullying she endured during high school made her drop out in the tenth grade. Growing up, Russo did not have any "ambitions", remarking that she "was too busy just trying to survive, along with my sister and my mom — money was tight, my mom worked two jobs". She began taking a variety of part-time jobs to help her family, including working in an eyeglass factory and as a movie theater cashier. She eventually got scouted for modelling and went to New York City, which she described as a "scary place compared to where I grew up".

== Modeling ==
After allegedly being spotted at a 1972 Rolling Stones concert by John Crosby, an agent from International Creative Management, Russo originally began her career as a model. With Crosby's encouragement, Russo applied to, and was signed by, Ford Modeling Agency. She became one of the top models of the 1970s and early 1980s, appearing on magazine covers for Vogue, Mademoiselle, and Cosmopolitan, as well as advertisements for perfume and cosmetics. Vogue in a 2016 article, wrote: "In the '70s, Russo stood for a sexiness that was both accessible and aspirational: She could vamp it up with the best of them, posing for Francesco Scavullo in decadent furs, or swathed in Versace for Richard Avedon, but Russo wasn't your average pinup. The poise she brought to her images made her the first choice for editorial shoots that demanded models with tenacity, whether she was bound for the boardroom in a power suit or posing on a beach with Tony Spinelli".

== Acting ==
=== 1980s ===
Modeling assignments began to wane for Russo as she entered her 30s. She did a few more commercials and then turned her back on modeling for a period of time. She studied theater and acting, and began appearing in theater roles at small theaters in Los Angeles and elsewhere in California. At one point, she took acting lessons from veteran actor Allan Rich, whom she credits with introducing her to the craft of acting. Russo made her debut in a television series in 1987, with a supporting role in the short-lived ABC production Sable, based on the comic book, Jon Sable: Freelance by Mike Grell. She made her feature film debut as the girlfriend of a former baseball star in Major League, a comedy written and directed by David S. Ward. The film was a critical success.

=== 1990s ===
In 1990, Russo appeared in the fantasy comedy film Mr. Destiny, with Jim Belushi, playing the wife in what was an alternate reality of an ordinary guy's life. In 1991, she had her first leading film role in One Good Cop, as the wife of a New York City Police Department detective (played by Michael Keaton). In 1992, Russo achieved breakout success with her role as internal affairs detective Lorna Cole, opposite Mel Gibson and Danny Glover, in the action film Lethal Weapon 3. The film made US$320 million worldwide, becoming the fifth highest-grossing film of 1992 and the highest-grossing film in the Lethal Weapon film series. Her other 1992 film release was the science fiction film Freejack, which despite an overall negative response, earned Russo a nomination for the Saturn Award for Best Supporting Actress.

Throughout the 1990s, Russo took on major roles in a number of commercially and critically successful films. In 1993, she starred with Clint Eastwood in the thriller film In the Line of Fire, directed by Wolfgang Petersen, playing a federal agent involved with the sole active-duty Secret Service agent remaining from the detail guarding John F. Kennedy in Dallas, Texas, at the time of his assassination in 1963. The film made US$176.9 million globally, and received three Academy Awards nominations. In 1995, Petersen cast her as a medical doctor, who uncovers a newly discovered Ebola-like virus which came to the United States from Africa in an infected monkey, in the medical disaster film Outbreak, with Dustin Hoffman. The film grossed over US$189 million worldwide. She starred as a B movie actress, opposite John Travolta, in the crime comedy Get Shorty, directed by Barry Sonnenfeld. Upon its release, Get Shorty opened atop at the North American box office and remained number one for three consecutive weeks.

In 1996, Russo played a clinical psychologist and the love interest of a former golf prodigy with little ambition in the romantic comedy Tin Cup, with Kevin Costner, and reunited with Mel Gibson to play his wife in the crime thriller Ransom, directed by Ron Howard. While Tin Cup was a moderate commercial success, Ransom was the 6th highest-grossing film of 1996, with a worldwide gross of US$309.5 million. In 1997, Russo portrayed exotic animal owner Gertrude Lintz in the little-seen comedy Buddy, and in 1998, reprised her role in Lethal Weapon 4, the final film in the series, which made US$285.4 million. In 1999, she starred as an insurance investigator and the lover of a billionaire, alongside Pierce Brosnan, in the heist film The Thomas Crown Affair directed by John McTiernan. Critic Kenneth Turan, in his review for the film, wrote: "[Her] smart, gritty performance is the best thing about this remake of the stylish caper movie Thomas Crown." The production grossed US$124.3 million worldwide.

=== 2000s ===
In 2000, Russo obtained the role of villain Natasha Fatale, opposite Robert De Niro and Piper Perabo, in the adventure comedy The Adventures of Rocky and Bullwinkle, directed by Des McAnuff and based on the television cartoon of the same name by Jay Ward. The film received mixed reviews from critics and went largely unnoticed at the box office. For her portrayal, she received a Saturn Award nomination for Best Supporting Actress, and simultaneously, a Razzie Award nomination for Worst Supporting Actress. She reunited with De Niro to play the producer of a reality police show in the comedy Showtime (2002), also starring Eddie Murphy. Budgeted at US$85 million, the film grossed US$77.7 million.

The comedy Big Trouble, which was based on the novel by Dave Barry and featured her as a devoted mother, was originally scheduled for release on September 21, 2001, and had a strong advertising push. The events of September 11 of that year cast a pall over the movie's comedic smuggling of a nuclear device onto an airplane. Consequently, the film was pushed back until 2002, and the promotion campaign was toned down almost to the point of abandonment. The film came to theaters and left quickly afterwards, without generating much of an impact.

Russo starred in and produced the film Two for the Money (2005), with Al Pacino and Matthew McConaughey, playing the wife of a sports gambling agent. In Yours, Mine & Ours (also 2005), Russo starred with Dennis Quaid, as a widowed handbag designer with ten kids. Film Journal International felt that the "secret to the film's modest success can be summed up" in Russo and Quaid's performances, and Daily Radar wrote that "the able-bodied actors fulfill the slapstick demands of this run-of-the-mill family comedy". Despite receiving overwhelmingly negative reviews from critics, the film made over US$72 million worldwide and marked her only commercial success in the decade. Following its release, Russo took a five-year hiatus from acting, opting to focus on her health and personal life.

=== 2010s ===
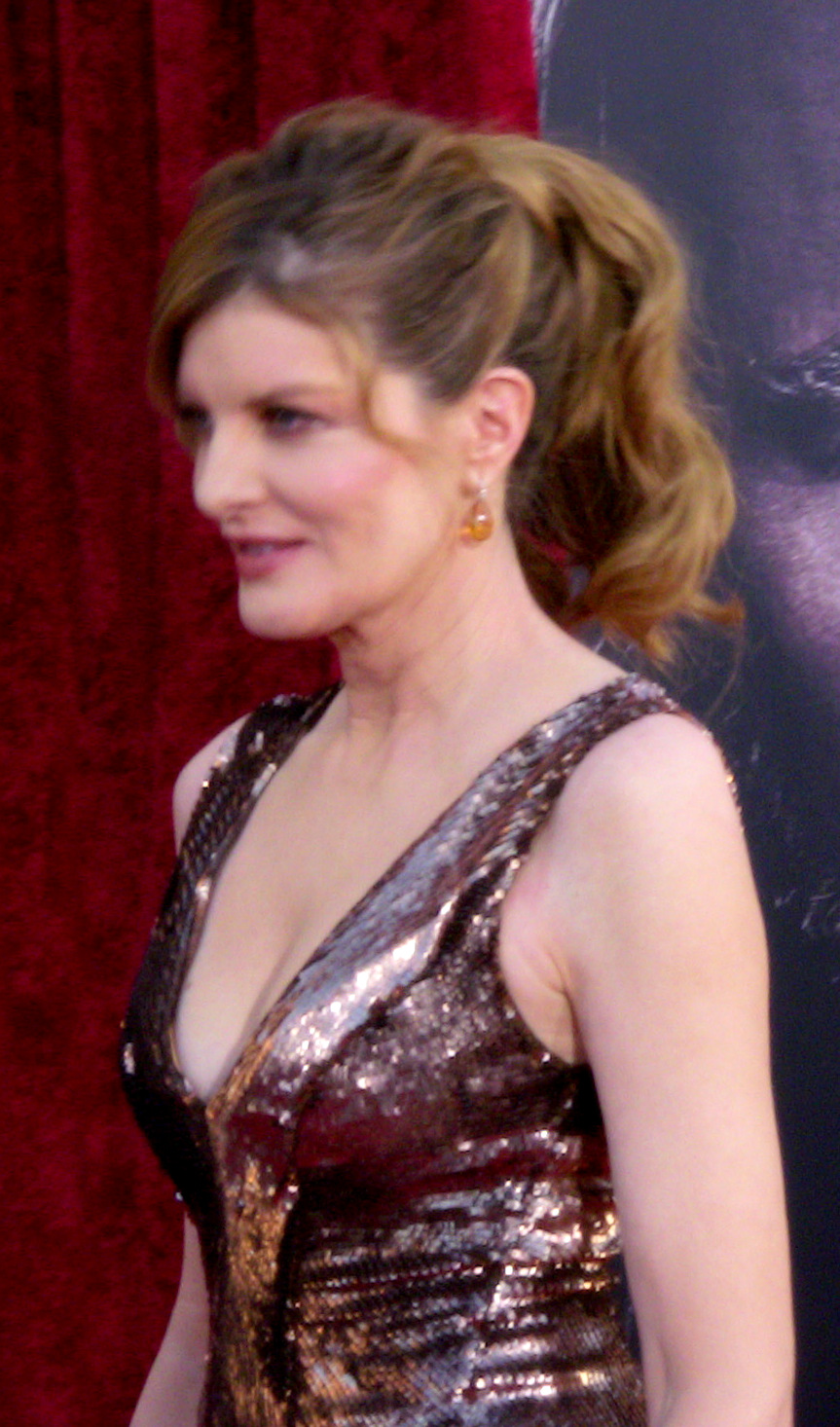
Russo at the premiere of Thor in May 2011

In 2010, Russo returned to the screen in the superhero film Thor, released in 2011, after being persuaded by director Kenneth Branagh in December 2009, who asked her to portray Frigga, the mother of the titular hero. However, most of her scenes were removed in editing. She received more screen time in Thor: The Dark World (2013). She credited those films, which made more than US$1 billion combined, with introducing her to a new generation of filmgoers. "The funny thing is now I have kids coming up to me, and I'm thinking, 'how do you know my movies?' And they say, 'That's Thor's mummy'."

In 2014, Russo appeared as a morning news director, alongside Jake Gyllenhaal, in the crime thriller Nightcrawler, written and directed by her husband Dan Gilroy. The film was met with widespread praise and several critics listed it as one of the best films of 2014. Indiewire asserted: "Russo is an integral part of the narrative and she gives as good as she gets. The role is easily her finest in several years and the rich material uncorks a wealth of inventiveness from the actress. There's not a lot of imaginatively drawn roles for aging women, but Russo sinks her teeth into the role of a coldblooded vampiress protective of her own uncertain hold in the newsroom." Budgeted at US$8.5 million, the film grossed US$50.3 million.

Russo portrayed a groupie and the mother of director G.J. Echternkamp in his independent comedy Frank and Cindy (2015), based on the 2007 documentary of the same name. In 2015, she reunited once again with Robert De Niro, playing an in-house massage therapist and his love interest, in the comedy The Intern, directed by Nancy Meyers. Both The Washington Post and New York Post found her to be a highlight in her role, and the film grossed US$194.6 million globally. Russo starred with Morgan Freeman and Tommy Lee Jones in another comedy, Just Getting Started (2017), as the regional director of the luxury resort Villa Capri in Palm Springs, California. Variety felt that the three actors "do little more than embarrass themselves here", as part of an overall negative response.

In Velvet Buzzsaw (2019), Russo worked again with Jake Gyllenhaal and Dan Gilroy, playing a tough art gallery owner haunted by the mysterious nature of a series of paintings by an unknown artist. The film was released by Netflix, to positive reviews. She briefly reprised her role of Frigga in Avengers: Endgame.

== Personal life ==
Russo married screenwriter Dan Gilroy on March 14, 1992. They met while working on the film Freejack (1992). They have one daughter, and live in Brentwood, Los Angeles.

Russo revealed during a 2014 taping of The Queen Latifah Show that she has bipolar disorder. While the condition has plagued her since childhood, an emotionally turbulent time prompted her to start taking medication, despite initial apprehension.

== Filmography ==
=== Film ===
Year	Title	Role	Notes
1989	Major League	Lynn Wells	
1990	Mr. Destiny	Cindy Jo Bumpers/Burrows	
1991	One Good Cop	Rita Lewis	
1992	Freejack	Julie Redlund	
1992	Lethal Weapon 3	Lorna Cole	
1993	In the Line of Fire	Lilly Raines	
1994	Major League II	Lynn Wells	Uncredited
1995	Outbreak	Robby Keough	
1995	Get Shorty	Karen Flores	
1996	Tin Cup	Molly Griswold	
1996	Ransom	Kate Mullen	
1997	Buddy	Gertrude Lintz	
1998	Lethal Weapon 4	Lorna Cole	
1999	The Thomas Crown Affair	Catherine Banning	
2000	The Adventures of Rocky and Bullwinkle	Natasha Fatale	
2002	Showtime	Chase Renzi	
2002	Big Trouble	Anna Herk	
2005	Two for the Money	Toni Morrow	Also executive producer
2005	Yours, Mine & Ours	Helen North	
2011	Thor	Frigga	
2013	Thor: The Dark World	Frigga	
2014	Nightcrawler	Nina Romina	
2015	Frank and Cindy	Cindy	
2015	The Intern	Fiona	
2017	Just Getting Started	Suzie Quinces	
2019	Velvet Buzzsaw	Rhodora Haze	
2019	Avengers: Endgame	Frigga	

=== Television ===
Year	Title	Role	Notes
1987–1988	Sable	Eden Kendell	7 episodes

== Awards and nominations ==
Year	Work	Award	Category	Result
1993	Freejack	Saturn Award	Best Supporting Actress	Nominated
1993	Lethal Weapon 3	MTV Movie Award	Best Kiss (shared with Mel Gibson)	Nominated
1996	Get Shorty	Screen Actors Guild Award	Outstanding Performance by a Cast in a Motion Picture	Nominated
1999	Lethal Weapon 4	Broadcast Entertainment Award	Favorite Supporting Actress–Action	Nominated
2000	The Thomas Crown Affair	Broadcast Entertainment Award	Favorite Actress–Drama	Nominated
2001	The Adventures of Rocky and Bullwinkle	Saturn Award	Best Supporting Actress	Nominated
2001	The Adventures of Rocky and Bullwinkle	Razzie Award	Worst Supporting Actress	Nominated
2001	The Adventures of Rocky and Bullwinkle	Stinkers Bad Movie Awards	Worst Supporting Actress	Nominated
2014	Nightcrawler	AARP Award	Best Supporting Actress	Won
2014	Nightcrawler	San Diego Film Critics Society Awards	San Diego Film Critics Society Award for Best Supporting Actress	Won
2014	Nightcrawler	Saturn Award	Best Supporting Actress	Won
2014	Nightcrawler	BAFTA Film Award	Best Actress in a Supporting Role	Nominated
2014	Nightcrawler	Denver Film Critics Society Award	Best Supporting Actress	Nominated
2014	Nightcrawler	Detroit Film Critics Society Award	Best Supporting Actress	Nominated
2014	Nightcrawler	Los Angeles Film Critics Association Award	Best Supporting Actress (2nd place)	Nominated
2014	Nightcrawler	National Society of Film Critics Award	Best Supporting Actress (3rd place)	Nominated
2014	Nightcrawler	Village Voice Film Poll	Best Supporting Actress	Nominated

== See also ==
- List of people with bipolar disorder
