= Frank & Rogier =

Dutch television personality duo

Frank & Rogier were a Dutch presentation and interior design duo consisting of Frank Jansen (Rotterdam, 10 March 1946) and Rogier Smit (Leiderdorp, 15 September 1974). The duo was mostly known for their television series Paleis voor een prikkie.

== Career ==
The duo first appeared on Dutch television in 2009 when they were featured in five episodes of the KRO's series Bij ons in de PC, showing their daily lives.

In 2017, the duo made their return to television in the SBS6 series Steenrijk, Straatarm in which they swapped house and income with a poor family. They decided to use their own recourses to fix up the property of the poor family. The episode was watched by 919.000 people.

Thanks to the positive audience reaction, SBS6 decided to develop a series in which the duo would try to fix up the interiors of people that can not afford to do so with a limited budget. The series was first broadcast in 2018. In 2019, the series was nominated for an award during the Televizier-Ring Gala in the category of Televizier-Ster Talent.

In 2019, the duo signed a three-year contract with RTL. As part of this contract they starred in the series Frank en Rogier checken in and Druiventros: d’r op of d’r onder. They also appeared in episodes of Ik hou van Holland, Dit was het nieuws and De TV Kantine.

== Break-up ==
Jansen and Smit were in a relationship from 2000 until the end of 2020. Because the two would fight about their break up publicly, RTL decided to end the contract they had signed in 2019, dissolving the duo. According to RTL the end of the contract was a mutual decision.
