= Gaston Vandermeerssche =

Belgian resistance leader (1921–2010)

- Born: August 18, 1921; Ghent, Belgium
- Died: November 1, 2010 (aged 89); Bayside, Wisconsin, U.S.
- Military career
- Allegiance: Belgium
- Unit: Belgian resistance
- Conflicts: Second World War

Gaston Vandermeerssche (August 18, 1921 – November 1, 2010) was a Belgian leader within the Dutch underground resistance against Nazi Germany during World War II. Vandermeerssche's life in France during World War II became the basis for a 1988 novel by Allan Mayer, which was later adapted into the 1997 Belgian film, Gaston's War.

Using the code name "Raymond", Vandermeerssche established an undercover smuggling line through the Pyrenees Mountains to deliver microfilmed intelligence from occupied Netherlands (Dienst Wim) and France to the Belgian military headquarters in London.

Vandermeerssche had a wife, Violette, with whom he had three daughters and one son. He emigrated to the United States and resided in Bayside, Wisconsin, where he died of natural causes on November 1, 2010, aged 89.
