= Jumping (film) =

1986 Belgian film by Jean-Pierre De Decker

- DVD cover
- Directed by: Jean-Pierre De Decker
- Written by: Stijn Coninx; Jean-Pierre De Decker
- Starring: Herbert Flack
- Release date: 6 March 1986
- Running time: 105 minutes
- Country: Belgium
- Language: Dutch

Jumping (Dutch: Springen) is a 1986 Belgian comedy film directed by Jean-Pierre De Decker. The film was selected as the Belgian entry for the Best Foreign Language Film at the 59th Academy Awards, but was not accepted as a nominee.

== Plot ==
In a luxury retirement home, the staff goes to great lengths to fulfill the residents' most bizarre wishes, from an elephant hunt to nuclear war.

== Cast ==
- Herbert Flack as Axel Woestewey
- Mark Verstraete as Pieter Paul 'Pipo' Himmelsorge
- Maya van den Broecke as Bellina Woestewey

== See also ==
- List of submissions to the 59th Academy Awards for Best Foreign Language Film
- List of Belgian submissions for the Academy Award for Best Foreign Language Film
