= Willem Elsschot =

Flemish writer

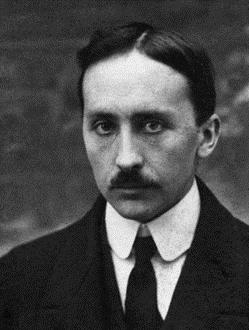
- Elsschot in c. 1920
- Born: Alphonsus Josephus de Ridder; 7 May 1882; Antwerp, Belgium
- Died: 31 May 1960 (aged 78); Antwerp, Belgium
- Occupations: Poet, writer
- Writing career
- Pen name: Willem Elsschot
- Language: Dutch
- Notable awards: Constantijn Huygens Prize (1951)

Alphonsus Josephus de Ridder (7 May 1882 – 31 May 1960) was a Belgian writer and poet who wrote under the pseudonym Willem Elsschot (pronounced [ˈʋɪləm ˈɛlsxɔt]). One of the most prominent Flemish authors, his most famous work, Cheese (1933) is the most translated Dutch-language novel from Flanders of all time.

== Early life and education ==
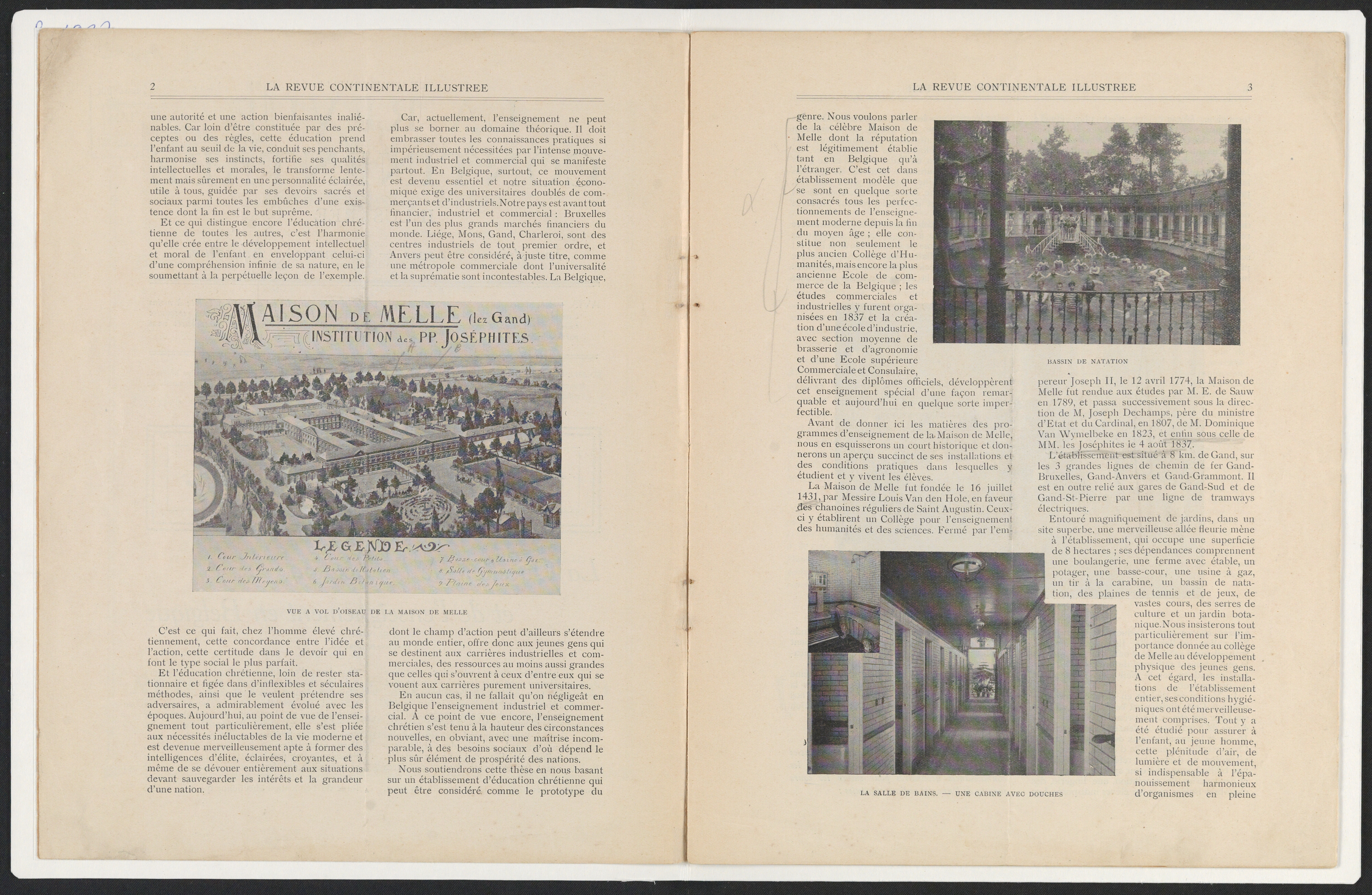
Excerpt from the magazine La Revue of Willem Elsschot.

Elsschot was born Alphonsus Josephus de Ridder on 7 May 1882 in Antwerp, to a family of bakers. As a child he would often visit his uncle in rural Blauberg, near Herselt, where they would walk in the Helschot area, from which he would later derive his pen name.

After studying at a state school in Van Maerlantstraat, then the Royal Athenaeum of Antwerp, he attended the Institut Supérieur de Commerce de l'État (nl), later known as the Rijkshandelshogeschool, where he would study economics and business, achieving a master's degree in commercial sciences in 1904. It was during his studies there that he would develop a love for literature, while under the tutorship of Pol de Mont.

== Professional career ==
After finishing his studies, Elsschot worked in Paris for a South American businessman, then for various businesses in the Netherlands.

During the First World War, he served as the secretary of a national food relief committee in Antwerp, after which he moved into the world of advertising, setting up his own agency in 1911, which he would run until his death.

Elsschot did not enjoy the world of advertising. Before his death in 1960 he was quoted as saying: "I am not only disgusted by advertising, but also by commercialism in general. And I wrote Lijmen because I had to get rid of it somehow. I had to advertise, because I could never live off my pen."

== Literary career ==
Elsschot began writing poetry in 1900, making his authorial debut as a poet (publishing in the magazine Alvoorder).

Yet it was as a writer of prose that he achieved much of his fame. Whilst living in Rotterdam he wrote Villa des Roses (1913), following the adventures of the guests of a Paris boardinghouse. While it was ignored by critics and readers alike upon its publication, his most famous works would come in the 1920s and 1930s: Lijmen (1924), Kaas (1933), Tsjip (1934) en Het Been (1938), novels with tragic and comic elements.

Central themes in his work are business and family life. His style is characterised by detailed descriptions of surroundings and a mild cynicism. In his first books he works with the same characters, giving the readers a familiarity and a sketch of life in Antwerp during the 1930s. His characters Boorman, an entrepreneur always looking for scams and opportunities, and Frans Laarmans, a clerk, evolve through these books.

== Personal life and death ==
He was married to Fine de Ridder, with whom he had a daughter, Ida. He also had a relationship with the poet Liane Bruylants.

In 1920, he became a knight of the Order of the Crown.

Elsschot died in Antwerp from a heart attack on 31 May 1960, at the age of 78. He was cremated and his ashes buried with the body of his wife in the Antwerpen Schoonselhof. He was posthumously awarded the State Prize for Literature, and in 1994 a statue of him was erected at Mechelseplein in Antwerp.

In 2005 he finished at No. 49 in the Flemish version of "De Grootste Belg" ("The Greatest Belgian").

== Adaptations ==
=== Film adaptations ===
His novel Lijmen/Het Been was adapted into film by Robbe De Hert in 2001 as Lijmen/Het Been. Villa des Roses was adapted to film in 2002 by Frank Van Passel as Villa des Roses.

=== Comic book adaptation ===
In 2008 the novel Kaas ("Cheese", 1933) and the novella Het dwaallicht ("Will o'the Wisp", in Three Novels, 1946) were made into graphic novels by Dick Matena.

== Bibliography ==
- (1913) Villa des Roses
- (1920) Een ontgoocheling (The disappointment)
- (1921) De verlossing (The salvation)
- (1924) Lijmen (Convincing)
- (1933) Kaas (Cheese)
- (1934) Tsjip
- (1934) Verzen van vroeger (Poems from the past)
- (1937) Pensioen (Pension)
- (1938) Het been (The leg)
- (1940) De leeuwentemmer (The lion tamer)
- (1942) Het tankschip (The tank ship)
- (1943) Verzen (Poems)
- (1946) Het dwaallicht (The will-o'-the-wisp)
- (1957) Verzameld werk (Collected work)

== See also ==
- Spijt
