= Buddy (1997 film) =

1997 film by Caroline Thompson

- Theatrical release poster
- Directed by: Caroline Thompson
- Screenplay by: Caroline Thompson
- Story by: William Joyce; Caroline Thompson
- Based on: Animals Are My Hobby by Gertrude Davies Lintz
- Produced by: Fred Fuchs; Steve Nicolaides
- Starring: Rene Russo; Robbie Coltrane; Alan Cumming
- Cinematography: Steve Mason
- Edited by: Jonathan Shaw
- Music by: Elmer Bernstein
- Production companies: Columbia Pictures; Jim Henson Pictures; American Zoetrope
- Distributed by: Sony Pictures Releasing
- Release dates: June 6, 1997 (United States); September 25, 1997 (Australia)
- Running time: 84 minutes
- Country: United States
- Language: English
- Budget: $19 million
- Box office: $10.1 million

Buddy is a 1997 American biographical comedy-drama family film written and directed by Caroline Thompson, produced by Jim Henson Pictures and American Zoetrope, and released by Columbia Pictures on June 6, 1997. It starred Rene Russo as Mrs. Gertrude "Trudy" Lintz and Robbie Coltrane as her husband.

The film was based loosely on the life of a gorilla called Massa with elements of Gertrude Lintz's other gorilla Gargantua (who was called "Buddy" at the time). In real life, Massa was sold to the Philadelphia Zoo after he attacked Lintz, while Buddy/Gargantua died young as a circus attraction and his remains are now on display in a museum.

The gorilla suit used for Buddy was created by Jim Henson's Creature Shop.

== Plot ==
Set in the 1930s, eccentric millionaire Trudy is an unapologetic animal lover.

Trudy takes her two newly arrived chimpanzees Joe and Maggie to the movies, causing lots of stares. Returning home to her grand estate, she greets her varied animals: kittens, horses, a cheeky talking green parrot, her prize-winning champion pack of briards, a raccoon, a porcupine, a tortoise and a flock of geese.

Dr. Bill Lindz, Trudy's amiable husband, calls her to the phone. After the call she explains to Dick, their animal handler, he is solely in charge of the animals until the evening, and she drives off to Philadelphia.

There, finding a sickly baby gorilla, Trudy whisks him home, adding to their family. Bill determines that Buddy, as she names him, has severe pneumonia. Life resumes in the Lintz household, while Trudy plies him to take a bottle. The chimpanzees cause a mischievous ruckus in the kitchen, which she ends using a type of rattle that scares them.

Not having luck finding information about gorillas, Trudy travels to see Professor Spatz, who claims knowledge of them from travel to Congo, but can give her no true insight. She marches home, determined to raise Buddy similarly to the chimpanzees, as her own son.

Buddy finds life in the city very difficult to deal with. Trudy discovers that he, unlike the chimpanzees, dislikes baths. He does not like sharing Trudy either. As he grows he gets stronger, making him hard to control. The chimpanzees often get up to mischief, thanks to Maggie's skill at getting the key, unlocking their cages.

A couple come to visit the mansion, the man convincing Trudy to bring the apes to show in the Chicago World's Fair. Bill tries to get her to leave Buddy at home, foreseeing problems. The chimpanzees, now there are a few more, are a great hit. However, naughty Maggie unlocks Buddy's cage. He has a particularly bad experience, as he gets disoriented. The noises, plethora of people and unfamiliar things unsettle him. The fair empties from fear of him.

Buddy has constant flashbacks of the incident, leaving him traumatised and making things even harder for him at home. After he goes on an aggressive rampage, causing a lot of damage to their home, Trudy finally takes Buddy to an ape sanctuary to live among his own kind in peace.

== Cast ==
- Rene Russo as Gertrude "Trudy" Lintz
- Robbie Coltrane as Dr. Bill Lintz
- Alan Cumming as Dick Croner
- Irma P. Hall as Emma
- Paul Reubens as Professor Spatz
- John Aylward as Mr. Bowman

Dane Cook cameos as a cop at the Chicago World's fair. Buddy operated by Peter Elliott (adult Buddy), Lynn Robertson Bruce (juvenile Buddy), Peter Hurst, Mark Sealey (toddler Buddy), Michelan Sisti, Leif Tilden, Star Townsend, Robert Tygner, and Mak Wilson (facial controls). Buddy's vocal effects provided by Hector C. Gika, Gary A. Hecker, and Frank Welker.

== Production notes ==
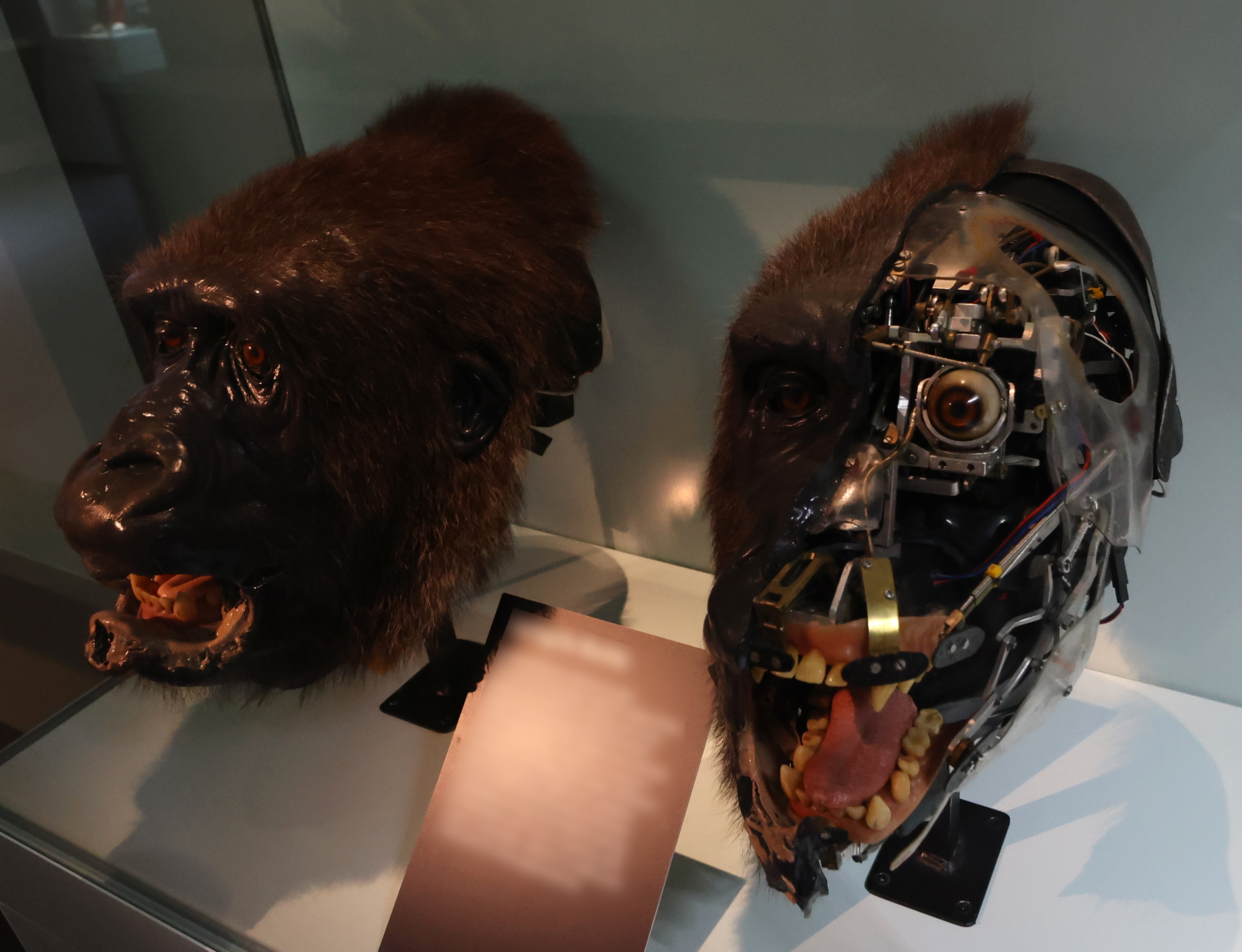
animatronic used in the film

Rene Russo began rehearsals with the chimpanzees a month before principal photography even started.

The story is loosely based on a real life socialite, Gertrude Lintz, who bred dogs and collected apes in her Brooklyn mansion in the 1920. The "real" Buddy owned by Lintz was sold to Ringling Brothers Circus at age 7 and was displayed as Gargantua the Great.

== Reception ==
On Rotten Tomatoes, the film has an approval rating of 22% based on reviews from 18 critics, with an average rating of 5.5/10. Audiences polled by CinemaScore gave the film an average grade of "B" on an A+ to F scale.

Roger Ebert of the Chicago Sun-Times gave the film two out of four stars, and wrote: "One of the peculiarities of the film is the vast distance between the movie they've made and the movie they think they've made." Entertainment Weekly gave it a grade C+.

The film was criticized for its unrealistic animatronics, especially when compared to the real ape performers.

In spite of the film's message, animal rights activists objected to the depiction of chimpanzees as docile pets, happily carrying on wearing human clothes. Among their concerns, was the perpetuation of the idea of chimps as acceptable pets.
