= Herman van Veen =

Dutch stage performer, actor, author, singer-songwriter, and musician

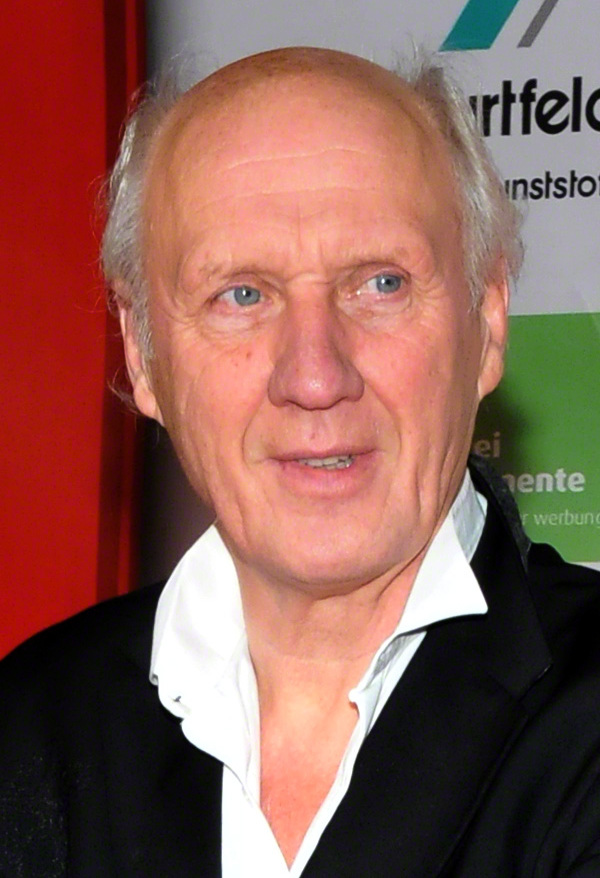
- Van Veen in 2013
- Born: Hermannus Jantinus van Veen; 14 March 1945 (age 81); Utrecht, Netherlands
- Occupations: Stage performer, actor, author, singer-songwriter, musician
- Years active: 1965–present
- Notable work: Alfred J. Kwak
- Spouses: Marijke Hoffman (m. 1967; div. 1971); Marlous Fluitsma (m. 1972; div. 1993); Gaëtane Bouchez (m. 1993)

Hermannus Jantinus van Veen (born 14 March 1945) is a Dutch stage performer, actor, author, singer-songwriter, musician and painter. He worked with accompanists Laurens van Rooyen and Erik van der Wurff, both of whom were pianists and composers.

== Alfred J. Kwak ==
In addition to performing in theatres and on television internationally, Van Veen is famous as the creator of Alfred J. Kwak (1976). The original one-man theatre show was adapted as a Dutch-German-Japanese cartoon (1989), which was broadcast internationally. In addition to creating the show's story, Van Veen also wrote, composed and performed most of the show's music. He sings in both Dutch and German.

He also performed the voice-overs for the characters Johan Sebastian Kwak, Krabnagel de Kater and Professor Paljas ("Professor Buffon") in the Dutch and German versions of Alfred J. Kwak.

== Discography ==
=== Albums ===
- Herman van Veen (II) (1969) NLD No. 6
- Carré Amsterdam (1971) NLD No. 2
- Carré III - Amsterdam (1976) NLD No. 14
- Overblijven (1977) NLD No. 7
- Op handen (1978) NLD No. 23
- De wonderlijke avonturen van... (1979) NLD No. 8
- Carré IV - Een voorstelling (1979) NLD No. 24
- Uit elkaar (1979) NLD No. 41
- Kerstliederen (1979) NLD No. 8
- Iets van een clown (1981) NLD No. 10
- Zolang de voorraad strekt (1982) NLD No. 49
- Signalen (1984) NLD No. 2
- De wisselaars (1985) NLD No. 32
- Anne (1986) NLD No. 10
- Carre V - De zaal is er (1987) NLD No. 31
- In vogelvlucht - 20 jaar zijn mooiste liedjes (1987) NLD No. 3, BEL No. 39
- De Clowns (1988) NLD No. 73
- Rode wangen (1989) NLD No. 72
- Blauwe plekken (1990) NLD No. 15
- Alfred Jodocus Kwak (1990) NLD No. 32
- In vogelvlucht 2 - Zijn mooiste liedjes (1991) NLD No. 26
- You Take My Breath Away - Herman van Veen Sings Popclassics (1992) NLD No. 73
- Voor wie anders (1993) NLD No. 63
- Stille nacht (with Ton Koopman) (1994) NLD No. 27
- Sarah (1996) NLD No. 21
- De Voetbalsupporter (1996) NLD No. 73
- Carré 7 - Alles in de wind (1997) NLD No. 85
- Nu en dan - 30 jaar Herman van Veen (1998) NLD No. 11
- Je zoenen zijn zoeter (with the Rosenberg Trio) (1999) NLD No. 16
- Carré 8 (2000) NLD No. 78
- Er was eens... Herman van Veen zingt en vertelt een kerstverhaal (2001) NLD No. 60
- Andere namen (2003) NLD No. 12, BEL No. 36
- Vaders (2005) NLD No. 19, BEL No. 52
- Chapeau (with Edith Leerkes) (2007) NLD No. 70
- Nederlanders (2007) NLD No. 24
- 100 (2009) NLD No. 7, BEL No. 70
- Vandaag (2012) NLD No. 28
- Kersvers (2014) NLD No. 2, BEL No. 39
- 10 keer Herman van Veen - Een keuze (2016) NLD No. 94
- Vallen of springen (2017) NLD No.15, BEL No. 62
- Dat kun je wel zien dat is hij (2021) NLD No. 18
- Dat kun je wel zien - live in Carré (2022)
- Moeders (2022), featuring Edith Leerkes

=== Singles ===
Year	Title	Peak chart positions		
Year	Title	NED Dutch Top 40	NED Top 100	BEL (Fl)
1968	"Het hondje"	–	–	–
1969	"Suzanne"	4	3	–
1969	"Cirkels"	Tip	–	–
1969	"Drie schuintamboers"	–	–	–
1969	"Waar ben je morgen"	Tip	–	–
1970	"Fiets"	–	–	–
1970	"Rozegeur & Marjolein"	21	18	–
1971	"De vluchteling"	–	–	–
1971	"Helden"	–	–	–
1972	"Jakob en Esau"	–	–	–
1974	"Kletsnatte clowns"	–	–	–
1976	"Eenentwintig van een kwartje"	–	–	–
1977	"Hebben en houwen"	–	–	–
1977	"Te hooi en te gras"	–	–	–
1979	"Weg da!"	–	–	–
1979	"Opzij"	14	11	30
1979	"Uit elkaar"	21	28	–
1980	"1984"	–	–	–
1980	"Hallo, ik ben een zanger"	–	–	–
1980	"Onder water"	–	–	–
1981	"Auseinander"	–	–	–
1981	"Keerzij"	Tip	–	–
1983	"De wolkentrapper"	–	–	–
1983	"De bom valt nooit"	Tip	–	–
1983	"La bombe va pas tomber "	–	–	–
1984	"Hilversum III"	5	6	13
1985	"Geen baan"	–	–	–
1986	"Anne"	35	30	–
1987	"Zo vrolijk"	–	–	–
1987	"Toveren"	–	45	35
1988	"De clowns"	Tip	65	–
1988	"Könntest du zaubern"	–	–	–
1988	"Praatjes"	–	87	–
1989	"Kusje"	–	–	–
1989	"Suzanne (1987)"	–	–	–
1990	"Blauwe plekken"	34	35	–
1990	"Genoeg"	–	80	–
1990	"Metliedje"	–	–	–
1990	"Wat de oude vrouw bad"	–	–	–
1999	"Staakt makkers staakt"	Tip	92	–
2002	"Andere namen"	–	94	–
2006	"Hij gaat er in"	–	–	–
2014	"Uitgerekend"	–	–	Tip: 70
"–" denotes releases that did not chart or not released in the territory

== Filmography ==
- Ciske de Rat (1984), as Meester Bruis
- Nachtvlinder (1999), as Wogram
