= Erik van der Wurff =

Dutch pianist, composer and arranger (1945–2014)

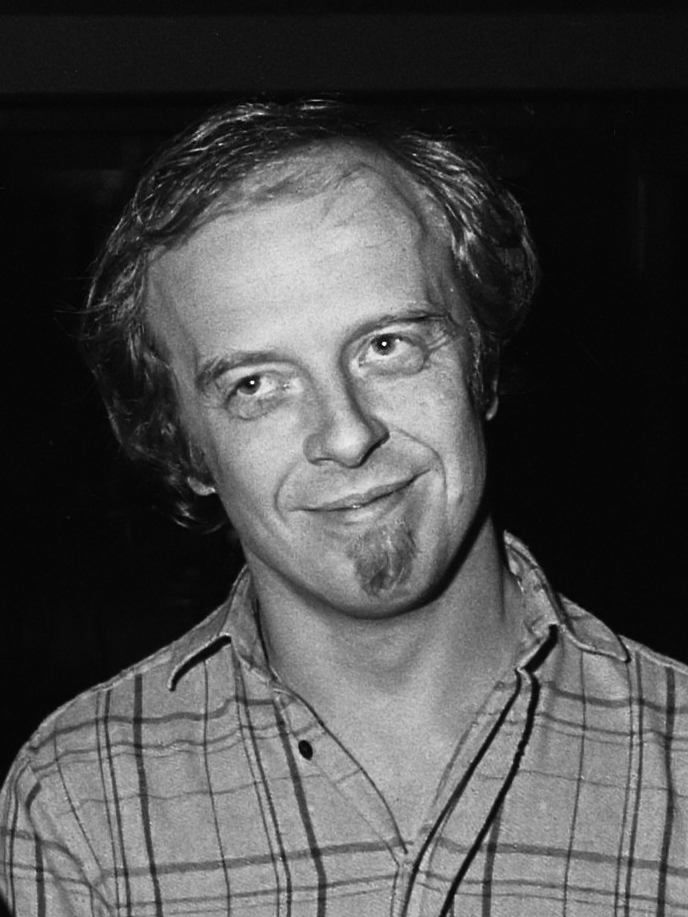
Van der Wurff in November 1979.

Erik van der Wurff (9 July 1945 – 22 September 2014) was a Dutch pianist, composer, arranger, record producer and conductor. He worked mainly on soundtracks and as a composer for many film and television shows. He also made acting appearances in two Dutch-German television shows in 1977 and 1980. He was the regular pianist and composer on the Herman van Veen shows. He composed music for many theater productions, musicals, movies and for the comic series Alfred Jodokus Kwak which was aired in various countries.

Van der Wurff was born in De Bilt, Utrecht. In 2009, he was given the Order of the Netherlands Lion.

Van der Wurff died from leukaemia in Soest, Netherlands, on 22 September 2014, at the age of 69.

== Other websites ==
- Erik van der Wurff at IMDb
