= Robbe De Hert =

Belgian film director (1942–2020)

- De Hert in 2006
- Born: 20 September 1942; Farnborough, Hampshire, England, United Kingdom
- Died: 24 August 2020 (aged 77); Antwerp, Belgium
- Occupation: Film director

Robin François De Hert (20 September 1942 – 24 August 2020) was a Belgian film director.

Next to feature films, De Hert also directed short films, series and documentaries, most of Flemish origin.

De Hert won the André Cavens Award for Best Film in 2000, with his film Lijmen/Het Been.

He died on 24 August 2020 at the age of 77 due to complications of diabetes.

== Selected filmography ==
- Camera Sutra (1973)
- De Witte van Zichem (1980)
- Le filet américain (1981)
- Maria Danneels of Het leven dat we droomden (1982)
- Zware Jongens (1984), featuring the comedy duo Gaston en Leo
- Trouble in Paradise (1989)
- Blueberry Hill (1989)
- Brylcream Boulevard (1995)
- Elixir d'Anvers (1997)
- Gaston's War (1997)
- Lijmen/Het Been (2000)
- Hollywood aan de Schelde (2018)

== Awards and nominations ==
Year	Association	Category	Work	Result
1989	Mystfest Festival Italy	Best film	Trouble in Paradise	Nominated
1989	Valladolid International Film Festival	Best film	Blueberry Hill	Nominated
1989	Joseph Plateau Awards	Best Belgian Director	Blueberry Hill	Won
1997	Shanghai International Film Festival	Golden Goblet-Best Film	Gaston's War	Nominated
1997	Joseph Plateau Awards	Best Belgian Director	Gaston's War	Won
2001	Joseph Plateau Awards	Best Belgian Director	Lijmen/Het Been	Nominated
2001	Joseph Plateau Awards	Best Belgian Screenplay	Lijmen/Het Been	Nominated
2012	Film by the Sea International Film Festival	Grand Director award	Career	Won
2018	Ostend Film Festival	Lifetime achievement award	Career	Won
2019	Ostend Film Festival	Best Documentary	Hollywood aan de Schelde	Nominated
