= List of Belgian films before 1960 =

This is a chronological list of films produced in Belgium. For an alphabetical list, see Category:Belgian films

== 1907-1919 ==
Title	Director	Cast	Genre	Notes
1907
Les Deux Vagabonds de Namur	Albert Mullens, Willy Mullens		Comedy	
1909
Le Moulin maudit	Alfred Machin	Pitje Ambreville, Berryer, Mademoiselle Saunières	Drama	
De Reis van Antwerpen naar Kongo	François Evenepoel, Léon Reinelt		Documentary	
Blijde intrede van koning Albert				
Te Deum à l'église de SS. Michel et Gudule, en l'honneur du roi Albert, le 25 décembre 1909				Release on Christmas Day
1910
Feest te Brussel ter eere van den heer Max, burgemeester				
Inauguration de l'exposition internationale de Bruxelles, le 23 avril 1910				
Revue des écoles par M. le bourgmestre Max, le 19 juin 1910. 8000 enfants y prennent part.				
Réception du lord-maire à la gare du Nord à Bruxelles				
Brussel. De koning en de koningin vertrekken naar Frankrijk. 12 juli 1910				
La Reine assiste au défilé du cortège de la Rose à Bruxelles-Kermesse, le 31 juillet 1910				
Remise des récompenses aux exposants dans les halls du parc du Cinquantenaire, le 18 octobre 1910				
Plechtige opening van de wetgevende Kamer op 8 november 1910 in aanwezigheid van de vorsten				
1911
Madame Babylas aime les animaux	Alfred Machin	Louis Boucot	Comedy	
1912
Begrafenis van de gravin van Vlaanderen, 30 november 1912				
Begrafenisplechtigheid van de gravin van Vlaanderen, moeder van Koning Albert I				
Liberale betoging van 15 augustus 1912				
L'Histoire de Minna Claessens	Alfred Machin	Albert Combes, Fernand Crommelynck, Denège, Fernande Dépernay	Drama	
1913
L'Agent Rigolo et son chien policier	Alfred Machin	Fernand Crommelynck, Arthur Devère, Willy Maury	Comedy	
Au ravissement des dames	Alfred Machin	Fernande Dépernay	Drama	
Le Blanc-seing	Alfred Machin	Maurice Mathieu	Drama	
Le Diamant noir	Alfred Machin	Albert Dieudonné, Blanche Derval, Fernand Crommelynck		
Monsieur Beulemeester, garde civique	Alfred Machin	Nicolas Ambreville, Fernand Gravey		Short
Saïda a enlevé Manneken-Pis	Alfred Machin	Fernand Gravey, Nicolas Ambreville, Balthus	Comedy	Short
1914
De Bertha				
8 avril 1914. Revue des troupes de la garnison de Bruxelles par le général de Bonhomme				
La Fille de Delft				
Maudite soit la guerre	Alfred Machin	Baert, Suzanne Berni, Fernand Crommelynck	Anti-war	
La Tulipe d'or	Alfred Machin	Blanche Derval, Henri Goidsen, Harzé, Blanche Montel		
Tragische en glorievolle verjaaringen Haelen, 12 oogst 1914				
1915
1916
1917
1918
1919
Translation des restes de Gabrielle Petit, de Bodson & de Smekens (fusillés par les Allemands). Le 1er juin 1919				
Begrafenis van 21 Brusselse burgers gefusilleerd door de Duitsers				
Patriottisch feest in Sint-Gillis.6.7.1919. Ter ere van de soldaten, de invaliden en de gedeporteerden van de gemeente				
Gemeentefeesten. 20.7.1919. Ommegang				
Nationale feesten 1919. Aankomst te Brussel van de Republikeinse garde. Het bezoek van president Poincaré aan Brussel				
Patriottische plechtigheid in Brussel op 21 juli 1919				
Brussel, 1 november 1919				

== 1920s ==
Title	Director	Cast	Genre	Notes
1920
Ommegang van Antwerpen 9 augustus 1920				
1921
L'Atlantide	Jacques Feyder	Jean Angelo, Georges Melchior, Stacia Napierkowska	Adventure, Fantasy	Co-production with France
1922
1923
Das Bildnis				
1924
Les Demi-vierges	Armand du Plessy	Lucienne Bouron, Gabriel de Gravone, Julio de Romero, Germaine Fontanes, Gaston Jacquet, Henri Myrial		Co-production with France
J'ai tué!				
1925
L'ABC: un grand hôtel congolais				
1926
Aankomst van prinses Astrid op 10 november voor haar huwelijk met prins Leopold			Documentary	
1927
1928
Thérèse Raquin	Jacques Feyder	Gina Manès, Hans Adalbert Schlettow, Wolfgang Zilzer, La Jana, Paul Henckels	Drama	International European co-production
1929

== 1930s ==
Title	Director	Cast	Genre	Notes
1930
De Abdij van Tongerloo				
Abstracte films getekend op pellicule				
L'Ommegang. 15 juillet 1930				
Défilé des combattants Place des Palais, le 20 juillet 1930				
Cérémonie patriotique au cinquantenaire le 21 juillet 1930				
Le Cortège historique. 4 août 1930				
Borderline				
1931
1932
1933
Don Quichotte				
1934
Lac aux dames				
1935
1936
1937
La Gloire du régiment	Sig Arno		Comedy	
1938
1939
Janssens tegen Peeters	Jan Vanderheyden	Charles Janssens, Louisa Lausanne, Jef Bruyninckx	Comedy	

== 1940s ==
Title	Director	Cast	Genre	Notes
1940
Ceux qui veillent	Gaston Schoukens		Documentary	
1941
Bonne chance, Monique	Jan Vanderheyden	Louisa Colpeyn, Martha Dua, Marina Candael	Comedy	
Een Aardig geval	Edith Kiel	Arthur Van Thillo, Jan Comans, Nini de Boël	Comedy	
1942
M. Dingemans en Mme. Babbel krijgen bezoek van den buiten	Jan Vanderheyden			
1943
Wenn die Sonne wieder scheint	Boleslaw Barlog	Paul Wegener, Maria Koppenhöfer	Drama	From novel by Stijn Streuvels.
1944
1945
1946
1947
La Crabe aux pinces d'or (The Crab with the Golden Claws)	Claude Misonne		Animation	First Belgian animated film; released 11 January 1947
Love Around the House	Pierre de Hérain	Pierre Brasseur, María Casares, Julien Carette	Drama	Co-production with France
1948
The Murdered Model	Pierre de Hérain	Blanchette Brunoy, Gilbert Gil, Julien Carette	Crime	Co-production with France
1949

== 1950s ==
Title	Director	Cast	Genre	Notes
1950
Ah! Qu'il fait bon chez nous				
1951
1952
The Smugglers' Banquet	Henri Storck	Yves Deniaud, Arthur Devère, Paul Frankeur	Crime film	Entered into the 1952 Cannes Film Festival; released 9 July 1952
Bongolo	André Cauvin		Documentary	Entered into the 1953 Cannes Film Festival
1953
1954
Albertville				
Bukavu			Documentary	Filmed in the Congo
1955
Seagulls Die in the Harbour	Rik Kuypers, Ivo Michiels and Roland Verhavert	Tone Brulin, Dora van der Groen	Drama	Entered into the 1956 Cannes Film Festival
1956
1957
1958
L'Abbaye de Kansenia				
1959
