= Karreveld Castle =

Castle-farm in Brussels, Belgium

- Château du Karreveld (French); Kasteel Karreveld (Dutch)
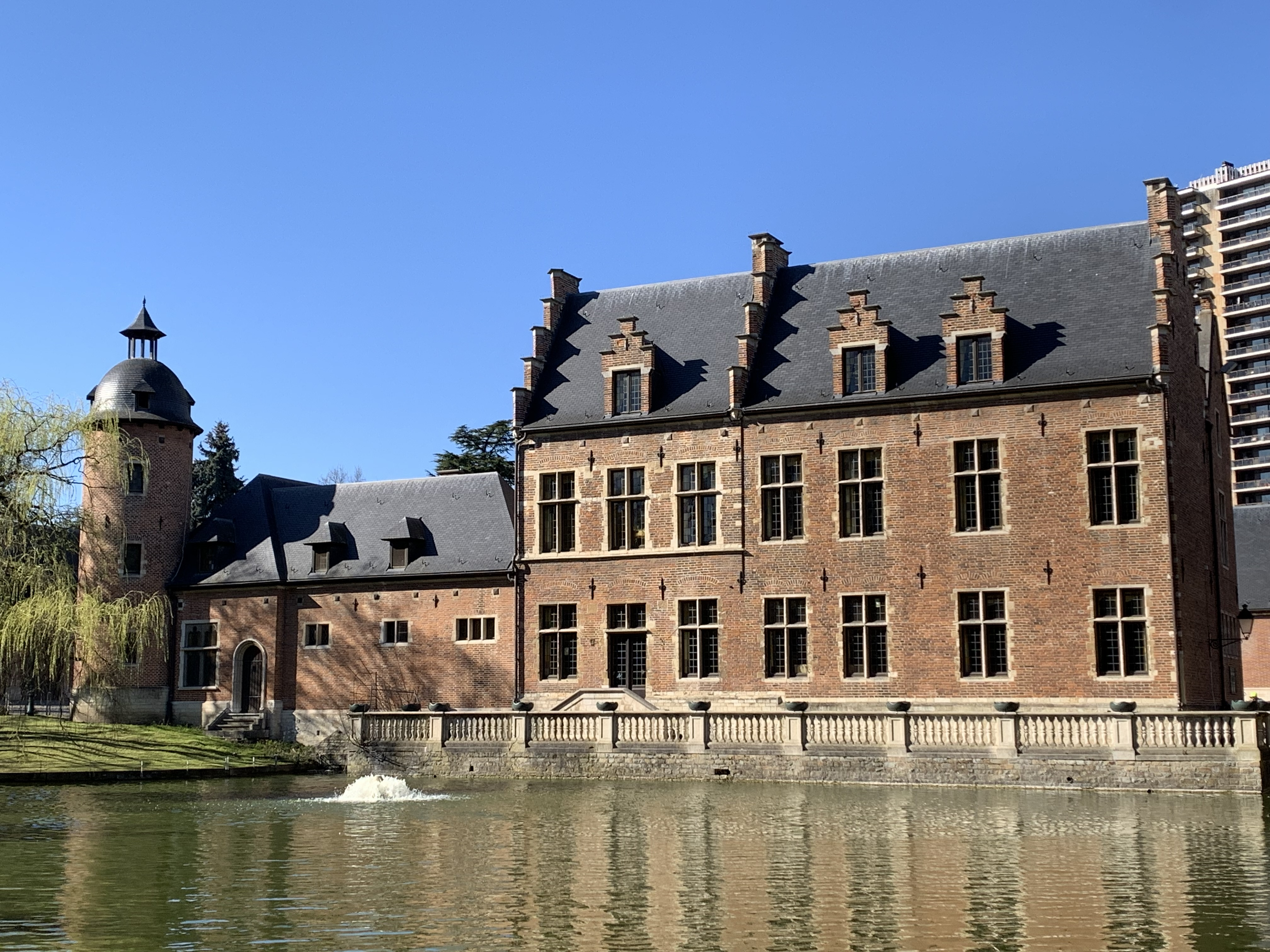
- Karreveld Castle and pond
- Interactive map of the Karreveld Castle area

General information
- Type: Castle-farm
- Architectural style: Flemish Renaissance
- Location: Avenue Jean de la Hoese / Jean de la Hoeselaan 32, 1080 Molenbeek-Saint-Jean, Brussels-Capital Region, Belgium
- Coordinates: 50°51′37″N 4°18′55″E
- Construction started: 16th or 17th century
- Renovated: 1952–1958

Design and construction
- Designations: Protected (10/11/1955)

Other information
- Public transit: 2 6 Osseghem/Ossegem

Karreveld Castle (French: Château du Karreveld; Dutch: Kasteel Karreveld) is a castle-farm in Molenbeek-Saint-Jean, a municipality of Brussels, Belgium. The castle and surrounding park are used for cultural events and meetings of the municipal council. It is located at 32, avenue Jean de la Hoese/Jean de la Hoeselaan.

== Toponymy ==
The name Karreveld (originally spelled Carrevelt) was first recorded in 1253 in a deed of donation by John I, Duke of Brabant, to his wife Margaret, daughter of King Louis IX of France. It is sometimes linked to the Dutch words Karel Veld, meaning "Charles Field", based on a legend that Emperor Charles V once stopped at the site. However, official records mention the name long before his birth. A more likely origin is the Old Dutch Karreelvelt, meaning "field of brick earth", referring to the local brickmaking activity that continued into the early 20th century.

== History ==
The current castle was built in the 16th or 17th century in the Flemish Renaissance style. In 1656, after passing through several owners, the castle and its estate became the property of the Spanish nobleman Don Garcia Osorio y Borgia. In 1780, the House de Villegas, an influential Belgian noble family of Spanish origin, who also owned Rivieren Castle in the nearby municipality of Ganshoren, acquired the Karreveld estate. The family retained ownership for nearly two and a half centuries.

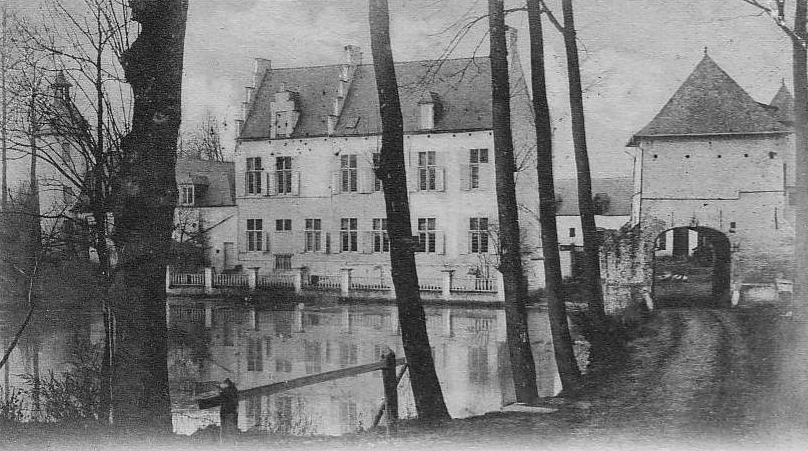
Karreveld Castle in 1904

Between 1900 and 1914, the estate was gradually repurposed for recreational and sporting activities. Hot air balloon launches were hosted there, and a wooden velodrome was established in 1908. The castle also accommodated a dairy and tavern. In 1912, Karreveld became one of the sites associated with the early development of Belgian cinema. At the request of Charles Pathé (Pathé Cinémas), the French director Alfred Machin established the country's first film studio there. Stretching across a meadow from the Chaussée de Gand/Gentsesteenweg to the Karreveld velodrome, this studio consisted of glazed sheds with offices, dressing rooms, workshops for set construction, as well as a small menagerie of exotic animals, such as bears, camels and two panthers, for use as 'extras' in films. Some twenty early Belgian feature films, including Saïda a enlevé Manneken-Pis, La Fille de Delft and Maudite soit la guerre (in hand-painted colours), were shot and produced there.

In 1930, the municipality of Molenbeek purchased the 16-hectare (40-acre) estate from the House de Villegas. Part of the land was redeveloped for urban projects including the extension of the surrounding boulevards and avenues—Boulevard Louis Mettewie/Louis Mettewielaan, Avenue de la Liberté/Vrijheidslaan, Avenue du Karreveld/Karreveldlaan, etc.—and the construction of villas, while then-mayor Edmond Machtens, elected in 1939, commissioned studies for the castle's restoration.

Restoration and reconstruction took place between 1952 and 1958, including new foundations, rebuilding of the main structures, and landscaping of the surrounding park with formal gardens, trees, and ponds. The estate was classified as a historic site on 10 November 1955 and inaugurated in 1958. Since then, Karreveld Castle has functioned as a municipal and cultural venue, hosting public events, exhibitions, and municipal offices.

== Events ==
=== Festival Bruxellons! ===
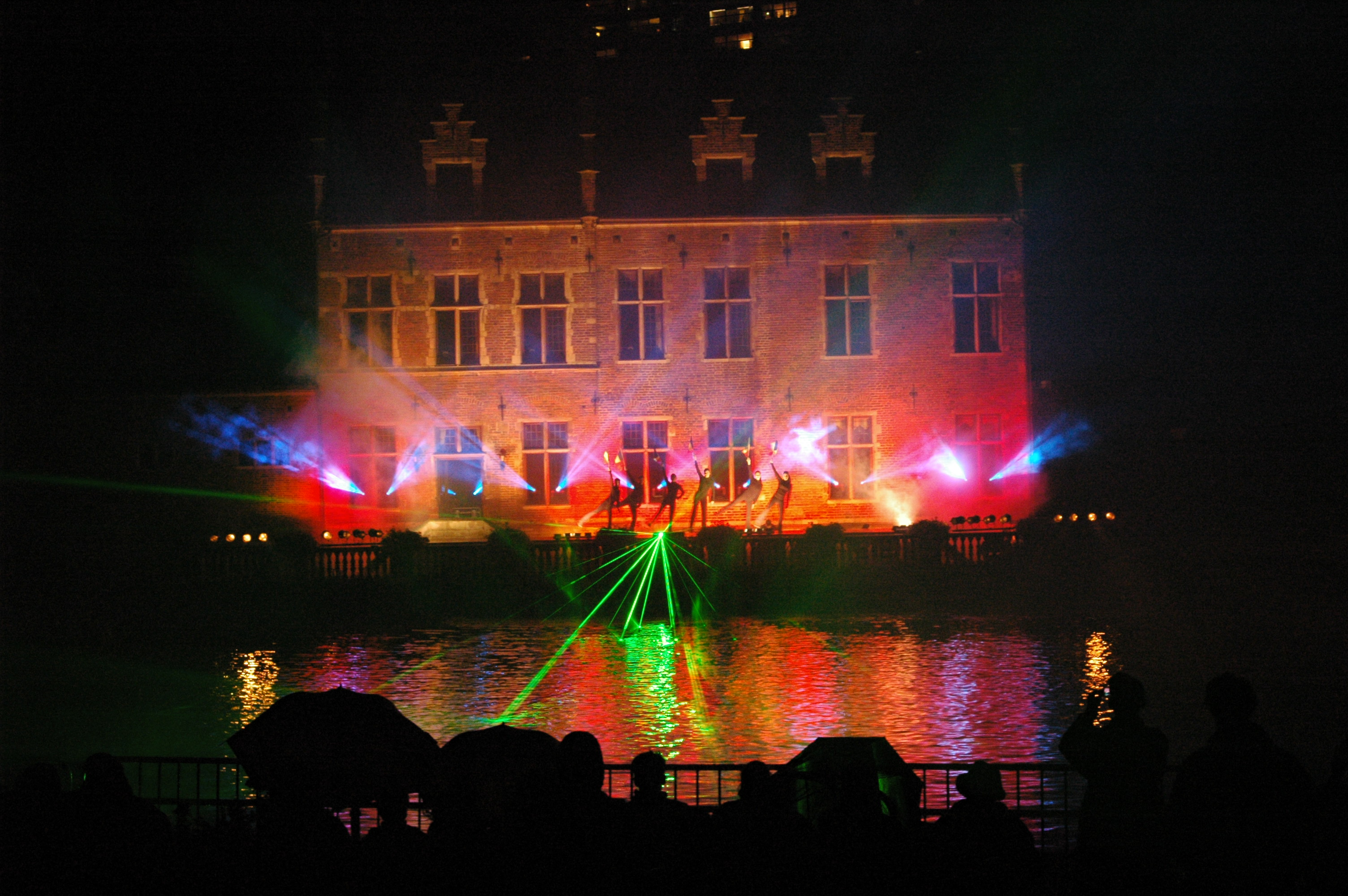
Night show at Karreveld Castle

Every summer, from mid-July to September, the castle grounds host the Festival Bruxellons!, a theatre festival open to other performing arts (i.e. magic, music, circus, etc.). Created in 1999, at the initiative of the municipality of Molenbeek, this festival has grown to offer up to thirty shows for a total of around 100 performances each summer. The programme is centred on Belgian artists and on a popular theatre dynamic that aims to share the best of theatre with as many people as possible.

=== The Blue Flamingo – Jazz Festival ===
The Blue Flamingo – Jazz Festival is a cycle of seasonal events dedicated to jazz. It has been co-produced by the municipality of Molenbeek since 2010. The concerts offered take place on Friday and Saturday evenings, three or four weekends a year.

== Gallery ==
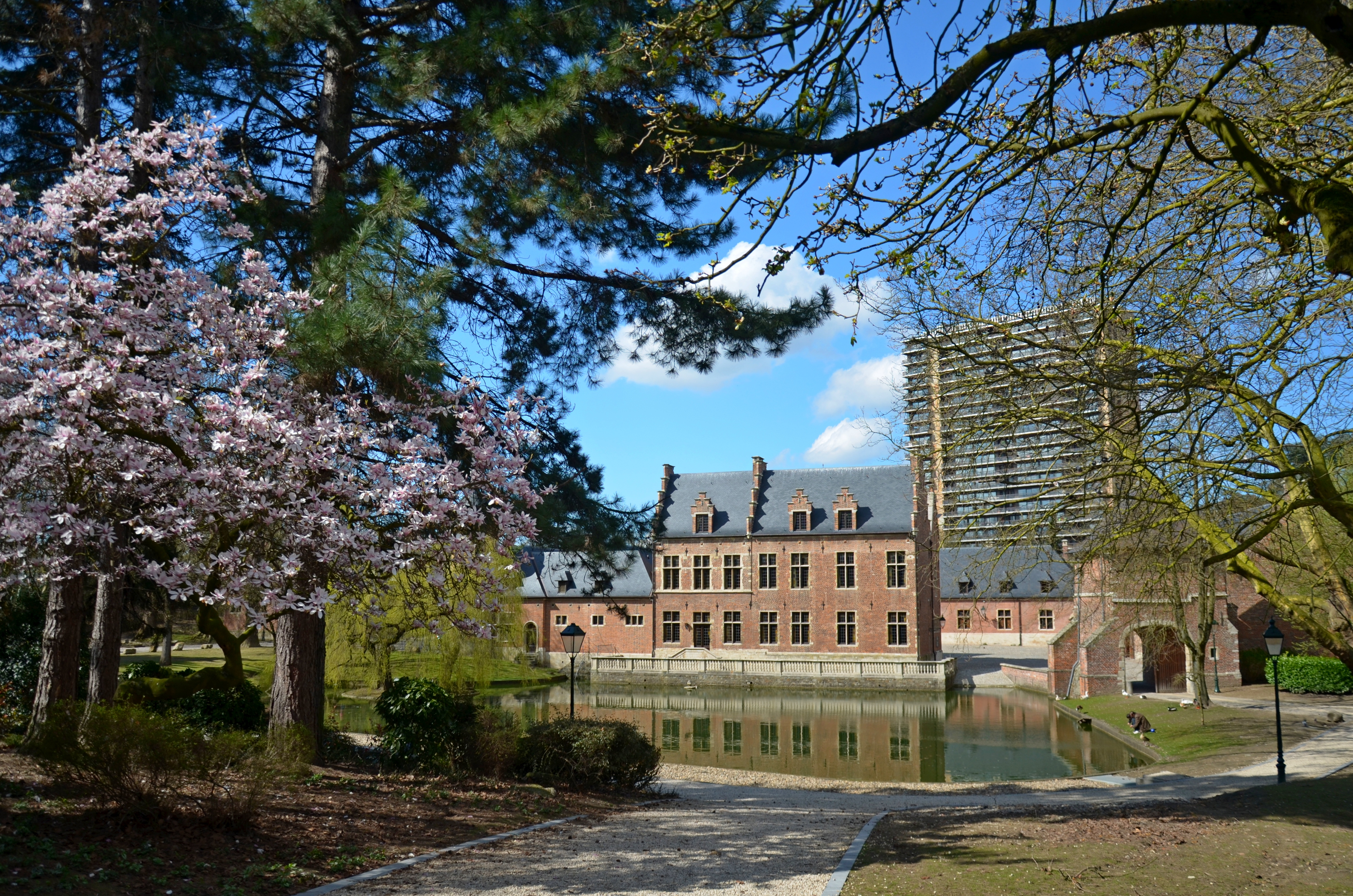
View from the park

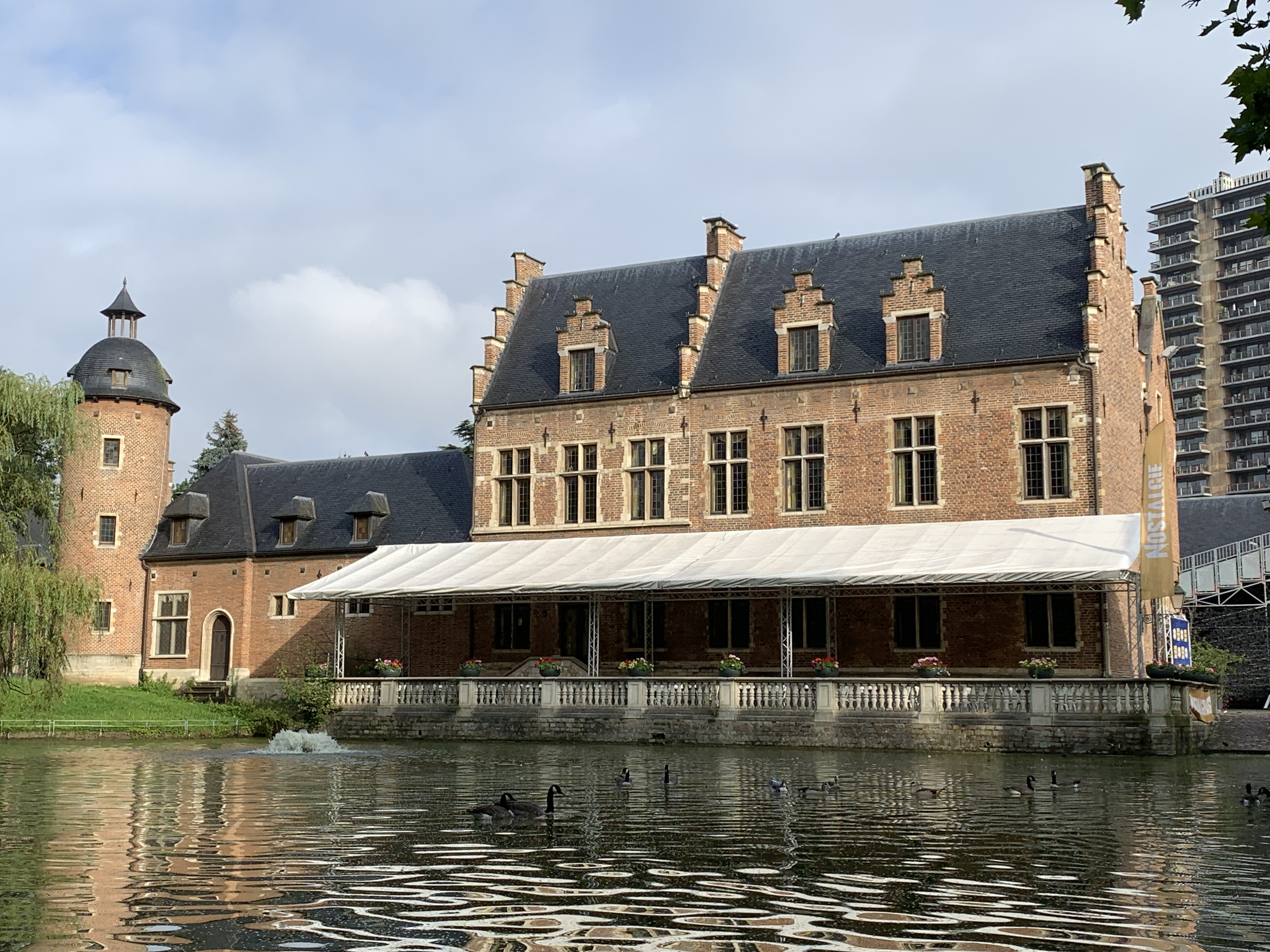
Front view

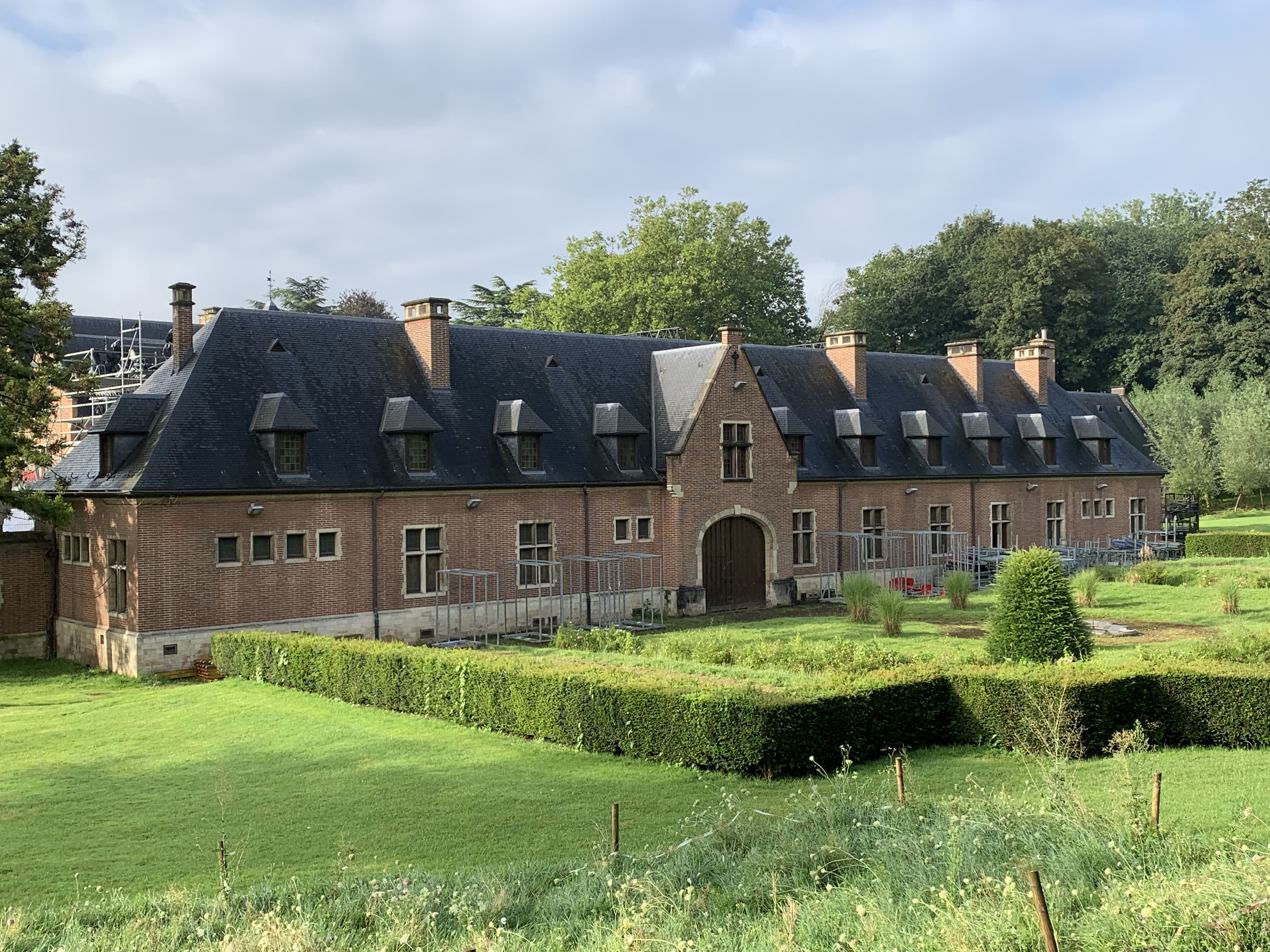
Rear view

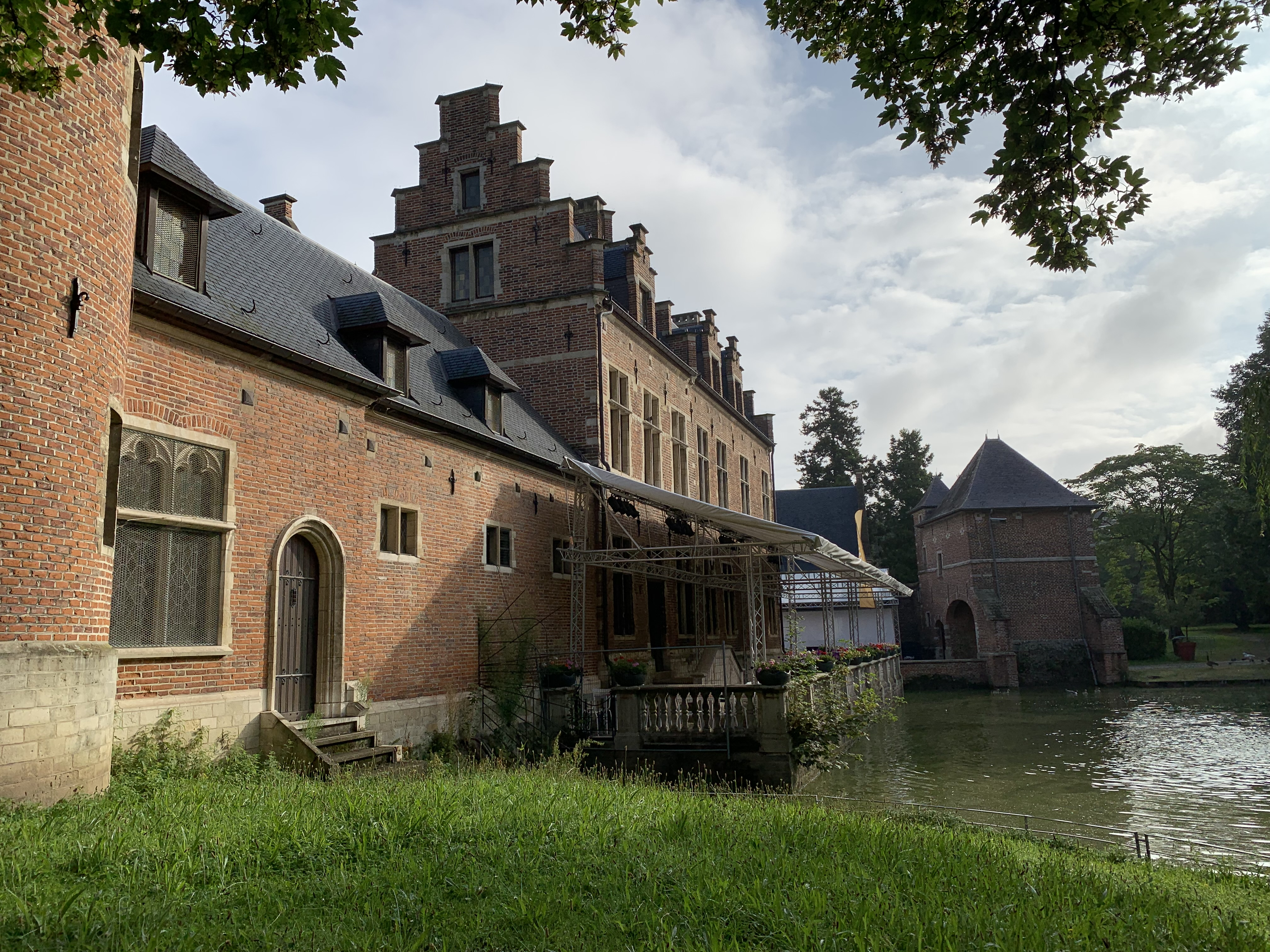
Lateral view

== See also ==
- List of castles and châteaux in Belgium
- History of Brussels
- Culture of Belgium
- Belgium in the long nineteenth century
