= Charles Janssens =

Belgian actor (1906–1986)

- Born: 8 June 1906; Borgerhout, Belgium
- Died: 23 August 1986 (aged 80); Antwerp, Belgium
- Occupation: Actor

Charles Janssens (8 June 1906 – 23 August 1986) was a Belgian film actor. He became known for his comic roles in films made with Edith Kiel and Jef Bruyninckx.

== Filmography ==
Year	Title	Role	Notes
1939	Met den helm geboren	Mijnheer Dingemans	
1939	Janssens tegen Peeters	Tist Peeters	
1939	Een engel van een man	Bonifacius	
1940	Janssens en Peeters dikke vrienden	Tist Peeters	
1942	Antoon, de flierefluiter	Chareltje Coppens, broer van Antoon	
1952	Uit hetzelfde nest	Hicketick	
1952	De moedige bruidegom	Thomas Borneman - een lustige vrijgezel	
1953	Sinjorenbloed	Pol Knol	
1953	Schipperskwartier	Jef Scheldemans	
1954	De spotvogel	Felix Peeters / Louis Appel	
1954	De hemel op aarde	Charles Engel	
1955	Min of meer	Frans Nagel	
1956	Vuur, liefde en vitaminen	Sergeant Sestig	
1956	De klucht van de brave moordenaar	Cipier	
1957	Wat doen we met de liefde?	Christoffel	
1958	Vrijgezel met 40 kinderen	Isidoor Van Dam	
1958	Het geluk komt morgen	Thomas Profeesor	
1960	Vive le duc!	Le trésorier communal	
1962	De ordonnans	Uitbater vlooienspel (II)	
1971	Mira	Snoek	
1971	Malpertuis	Philarette	
1975	Verbrande brug	Grootvader	
1976	De komst van Joachim Stiller	Siegfried	
1979	Kasper in de onderwereld	Simon	(final film role)

== Bibliography ==
- Mathijs, Ernest. The Cinema of the Low Countries. Wallflower Press, 2004.
