= Gaston Berghmans =

Belgian actor and comedian

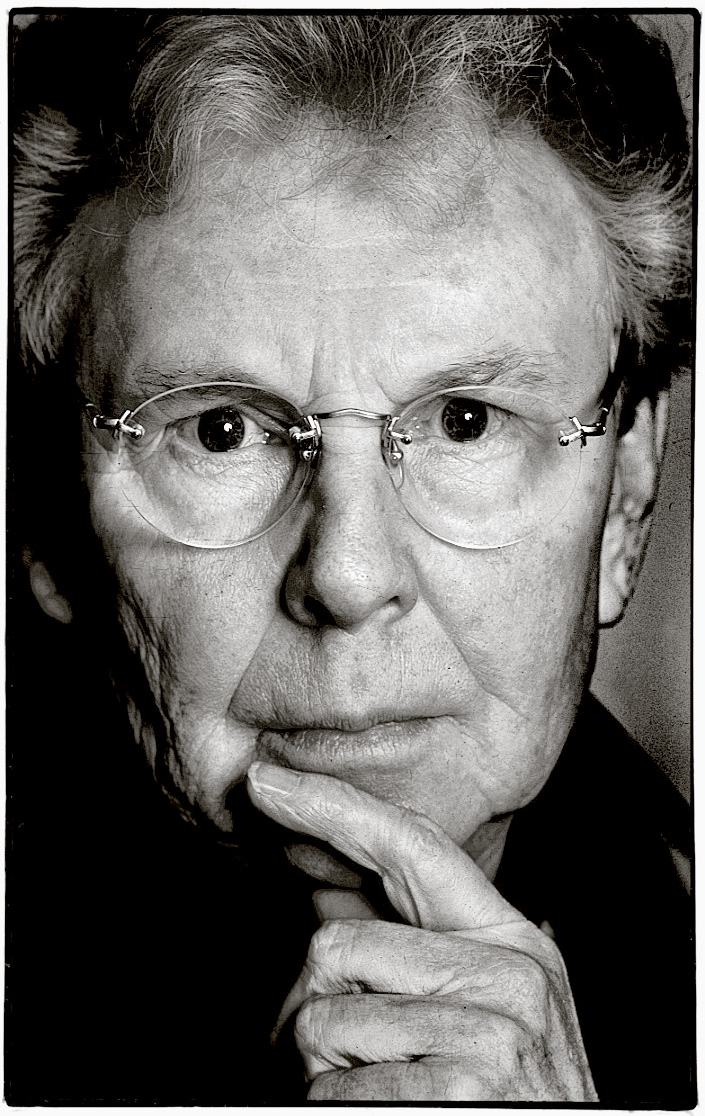
- Born: 11 March 1926; Merksem, Belgium
- Died: 21 May 2016 (aged 90); Schoten, Belgium
- Occupation(s): Actor, comedian
- Children: 1

Gaston Petrus Bernardina Berghmans (11 March 1926 – 21 May 2016) was a Belgian actor and comedian. Between 1972 and 1993 he and Leo Martin formed a comic duo called Gaston and Leo.

== Youth ==
Gaston Berghmans was the eldest son in a family with two children. His sister, Paula, is four years younger and has lived in the U.S. since 1959. Berghmans's father was an independent diamond cutter, his mother worked as an assistant in her sister's butcher shop.

== Early career ==
He performed at the Ancienne Belgique concert hall.

Berghmans married in 1960; his daughter was born in 1961.

== Early film career ==
In the late 1950s he also appeared in several films directed by Flemish comic Jan Vanderheyden:

- Een zonde waard "Worth a sin"
- Den duivel te slim "Too smart for the devil"
- Hoe zotter hoe liever "The crazier the better"
- De stille genieter "The silent hedonist"

They were all successful in Flanders and increased Gaston's reputation and work efforts.

== Gaston and Leo ==
Gaston first met Leo Martin in 1957 in the Billiard Palace, where the orchestra of Willy Rockin played. Martin played the saxophone and clarinet and Gaston performed sketches with him. In the 1960s Martin got his own orchestra and it became easier to invite Gaston to come perform sketches. Their performances were often comic prologues for Martin's musical moments. These performances were the foundation for what would be later evolve into their double act Gaston and Leo.

In 1972 Martin's band broke up and the two men became a successful comedic duo. Over the years, Gaston and Leo performed countless times in Flemish theaters and cultural centers. Several comedy albums were released, as well as a celebrity comic.

Gaston & Leo on a 1978 vinyl cover

=== BRT television work ===
From 1972 Gaston and Leo also appeared on the state-owned Belgische Radio- en Televisieomroep (BRT) television network, including a 1980 police comedy sitcom De Kolderbrigade, and some New Year's Eve special broadcasts.

They also made four films together: The boat to Spain (1982) (director: Willy Vanduren), Thugs (1984) (director: Robbe De Hert), The Panic Sowers (1986) (director: Patrick Lebon) and Gaston en Leo in Hong Kong (1988) (director: Paul Cammermans).

Through the years Gaston and Leo remained very popular in Flanders, but expanding their career to the French-speaking part of Belgium or the Netherlands was not an option, as they consciously used the Antwerp dialect.

=== VTM television work ===
In 1989, Berghmans and Martin left BRT for the brand new commercial broadcaster vtm (Vlaamse Televisie Maatschappij). Although both in their sixties, they relaunched their career with De Gaston en Leo show, a weekly program that was built around short sketches.

Both comedians had health problems. Berghmans got cancer and had to walk around with a stoma. Martin got lung cancer and died on 18 March 1993. Six months earlier they had appeared in the VTM show 20 years of Gaston and Leo which was presented by Luc Appermont.

== After Martin's death ==
Martin's death was a severe blow to Berghmans as his partner was irreplaceable. On the occasion of his 80th birthday on 6 December 2006 VTM aired a program titled Gaston 80. In 2008 he appeared in the movie Christmas in Paris. The film was an artistic disappointment and a commercial flop.

In 2005 he finished at No. 459 in the Flemish version of The Greatest Belgian, outside the official nomination list. In 2006 King Albert II awarded Berghmans the title Commander in the Order of the Crown. On 27 March 2009 Gaston Berghmans received the Flemish TV Stars Career Star 2009 during a Flemish Television Academy gala.

At the age of 90, Gaston Berghmans died on 21 May 2016.

In 2023, a musical Gaston and Leo, de hommage was announced, in addition to the release of a retrospective book about the lives of the two comedians.

== Film career ==
- Een Zonde waard (1959) .... as Tony Dertien
- Hoe zotter, hoe liever (1960) .... as Mil
- De Duivel te slim (1960) .... as Pol
- De stille genieter (1961) .... as Gaston Somers
- Pallieter (1976) .... as Veldwachter
- De Witte van Sichem (1980) .... as Nand
- De boot naar Spanje (1982) .... as Desiré
- Zware jongens (1984) .... as Gaston Berghmans
- Paniekzaaiers (1986) .... as Gaston
- Gaston en Leo in Hong Kong (1988) .... as Gaston
- She Good Fighter (1995) .... as Rick
- Dief! (1998) .... as Bompa Van Reeth
- Christmas in Paris (2008)
