= 1956 Cannes Film Festival =

- Official poster of the 9th Cannes Film Festival, an original illustration by Marcel Huet.
- Opening film: Marie Antoinette Queen of France
- Closing film: The Roof
- Location: Cannes, France
- Founded: 1946
- Awards: Palme d'Or: The Silent World
- No. of films: 39 (In Competition)
- Festival date: 23 April 1956 – 10 May 1956
- Website: festival-cannes.com/en

Cannes Film Festival
- 1957 1955

The 9th Cannes Film Festival took place from 23 April to 10 May 1956. French actor, director and producer Maurice Lehmann served as jury president for the main competition.

The Palme d'Or, the festival's top prize, was awarded to The Silent World by Jacques-Yves Cousteau and Louis Malle.

In an effort to resolve some issues caused by the Cold War climate of the time, like special treatment towards Americans (who gave financial assistance to the festival) which displeased the Eastern Bloc, a rule to have films withdrawn under certain conditions was in effect until 1955, even though it had become a divisive issue within the festival directors, as it was seen as censorship. In 1956, it was officially decided to eliminate all such censorship from the selection.

The festival opened with Marie Antoinette Queen of France by Jean Delannoy and closed with The Roof by Vittorio De Sica.

== Juries ==
=== Main competition ===
- Maurice Lehmann, French actor, director and producer - Jury President
- Arletty, French actress
- Louise Lévêque de Vilmorin, French writer and journalist
- Jacques-Pierre Frogerais, French
- Henri Jeanson, French writer and journalist
- Domenico Meccoli, Italian writer
- Otto Preminger, Austrian-American filmmaker and actor
- James Quinn, British film administrator, producer and exhibitor
- Roger Regent, French
- María Romero, Chilean
- Sergei Vasilyev, Soviet filmmaker and actor

=== Short films competition ===
- Francis Bolen, Belgian
- Antonín Brousil, Czechoslovak
- Henri Fabiani, French
- Paul Grimault, French filmmaker
- Jean Perdrix, French filmmaker

== Official selection ==
=== In competition ===
The following feature films competed for the Palme d'Or:

English title	Original title	Director(s)	Production country
Afternoon of the Bulls	Tarde de toros	Ladislao Vajda	Spain
Christ in Bronze	青銅の基督	Minoru Shibuya	Japan
Dalibor		Václav Krška	Czechoslovakia
Drumsticks	Shevagyachya Shenga	Shantaram Athavale	India
A Girl in Black	Το Κορίτσι με τα Μαύρα	Michael Cacoyannis	Greece
Hanka		Slavko Vorkapich	Yugoslavia
The Harder They Fall		Mark Robson	United States
The Hidden One	La escondida	Roberto Gavaldón	Mexico
I Live in Fear	生きものの記録	Akira Kurosawa	Japan
I'll Cry Tomorrow		Daniel Mann	United States
Item One	Точка първа	Boyan Danovski	Bulgaria
The Leech	Shabab emraa	Salah Abu Seif	Egypt
The Man in the Gray Flannel Suit		Nunnally Johnson	United States
Marie Antoinette Queen of France	Marie-Antoinette reine de France	Jean Delannoy	France, Italy
Merry-Go-Round	Körhinta	Zoltán Fábri	Hungary
Mother	Мать	Mark Donskoy	Soviet Union
Mozart		Karl Hartl	Austria
The Mystery of Picasso	Le mystère Picasso	Henri-Georges Clouzot	France
Othello	Отелло	Sergei Yutkevich	Soviet Union
Pather Panchali		Satyajit Ray	India
The Phantom Horse	幻の馬	Koji Shima	Japan
The Protar Affair	Afacerea Protar	Haralambie Boros	Romania
The Railroad Man	Il ferroviere	Pietro Germi	Italy
Road to Life	Педагогическая поэма	Aleksei Maslyukov and Mechislava Mayevskaya	Soviet Union
The Roof	Il tetto	Vittorio De Sica	Italy
Seagulls Die in the Harbour	Meeuwen sterven in de haven	Roland Verhavert, Ivo Michiels and Rik Kuypers	Belgium
Seven Years in Tibet		Hans Nieter	United Kingdom
Shadow	Cień	Jerzy Kawalerowicz	Poland
The Silent World	Le Monde du silence	Jacques Cousteau and Louis Malle	France
Smiles of a Summer Night	Sommarnattens leende	Ingmar Bergman	Sweden
Sob o Céu da Bahia		Ernesto Remani	Brazil
Talpa		Alfredo B. Crevenna	Mexico
El Último perro		Lucas Demare	Argentina
The Unwilling Doctor	Toubib el affia	Henry Jacques	Morocco
Walk Into Paradise		Lee Robinson	Australia, France
Wild Love	Gli innamorati	Mauro Bolognini	Italy
Yield to the Night		J. Lee Thompson	United Kingdom

=== Short films competition ===
The following short films competed for the Short Film Palme d'Or:

- Aéroport de Luxembourg by Philippe Schneider
- Andre Modeste Gretry by Lucien Deroisy
- Le ballon rouge by Albert Lamorisse
- Bwana Kitoko by André Cauvin
- Ciganytanc by Tamas Banovich
- Columbia Musical Travelark: Wonders of Manhattan by Harry Foster
- La corsa delle rocche by Gian Luigi Polidoro
- Crne vode by Rudolf Sremec
- En de zee was niet meer by Bert Haanstra
- The Face of Lincoln by Edward Freed
- Festival Melody (Melodii festivalia) by Jerzy Bossak, R. Grigoriev, Ilya Kopalin, Iosif Poselski
- Fuji wa ikiteiru by Kenji Shimomura
- Gateway To the Antarctic by Duncan Carse
- Gerald McBoing on Planet Moo or Gerald McBoing! Boing! on Planet Moo by Robert Cannon
- Growing Coconuts by Fali Bilimoria
- Horizons nouveaux by Kurt Baum
- Karius and Bactus (Karius og Baktus) by Ivo Caprino
- Kati és a vadmacska by Ágoston Kollányi
- Katsura rikyu by Minoru Kuribayashi
- Loutky Jiriho Trnky by Bruno Sefranek
- Magdana's Donkey (Lurdzha Magdany) by Tengiz Abuladze and Rezo Chkheidze
- Marinica by Ion Popescu-Gopo
- Nicolae Grigorescu by Ion Bostan
- Parabola d'oro by Vittorio De Seta
- Les pécheurs du cap by Errol Hinds
- Portrait of Soutland by Peter Roger Hunt
- Povest za tirnovgrad by Yuri Arnaudov
- Salut à la France by Ric Eyrich, Thomas L. Rowe
- Salzburger Impressionen by Prof. Hanns Wagula
- The Shepherd by Julian Biggs
- Stvoreni syeta by E. Hofman
- Svedocanstva o tesli by Vladimir Pogacic
- Tant qu'il y aura des bêtes by Braissai
- Teatr lalek by Marian Ussorowski
- Together by Lorenza Mazzetti
- Tovarishch ukhodit v more by Nikita Kurikhin
- Vand fra eufrat by Theodor Christensen

== Official awards ==
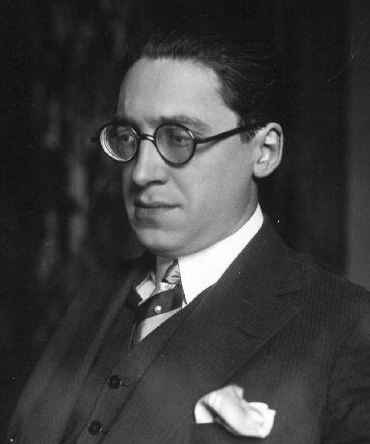
Maurice Lehmann, Jury President

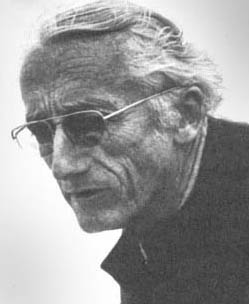
Jacques Cousteau, Palme d'Or winner

=== Main competition ===
- Palme d'Or: The Silent World by Jacques Cousteau and Louis Malle
- Jury Special Prize: The Mystery of Picasso by Henri-Georges Clouzot
- Best Director: Sergei Yutkevich for Othello
- Best Acting Award: Susan Hayward for I'll Cry Tomorrow
- Best Human Document: Pather Panchali by Satyajit Ray
- Best Poetic Humour: Smiles of a Summer Night by Ingmar Bergman

=== Short films competition ===
- Short Film Palme d'Or: The Red Balloon by Albert Lamorisse
- Best Fiction Film: Magdana's Donkey by Tengiz Abuladze and Revaz Chkheidze
- Best Documentary:
  - Andre Modeste Gretry by Lucien Deroisy
  - La corsa delle rocche by Gian Luigi Polidoro
- Special Mention: The Puppets of Jiri Trnka by Bruno Sefranek
- Special Mention - Investigative Film:
  - Together by Lorenza Mazzetti
  - Tant qu'il y aura des bêtes by Braissai

== Independent awards ==
=== OCIC Award ===
- The Roof by Vittorio De Sica
- Special Mention:
  - The Railroad Man by Pietro Germi
  - The Man in the Gray Flannel Suit by Nunnally Johnson
  - Pather Panchali by Satyajit Ray

== Media ==
- British Pathé: Cannes Film Festival 1956 footage
- British Pathé: Originals Cannes Film Festival 1956 footage
- British Pathé: "Stars in the sun" 1956 Festival footage
- INA: Atmosphere at the 1956 Festival (commentary in French)
- INA: Opening of the 1956 festival (commentary in French)
- INA: Closing evening of the 1956 Festival (commentary in French)
