= Zichem =

- Location in Belgium
- Coordinates: 51°00′N 4°59′E
- Country: Belgium
- Region: Flemish Region
- Community: Flemish Community
- Province: Flemish Brabant
- Municipality: Scherpenheuvel-Zichem
- Postal codes: 3271
- Area codes: 013

Zichem is a village of the town of Scherpenheuvel-Zichem in the Belgian province of Flemish Brabant. Zichem was an independent municipality until the municipal redistribution of 1977.

== History ==
Zichem belonged to Maria van Loon-Heinsberg, who was a descendant of the Counts of Loon. After her marriage in 1440 to Jan IV of Nassau, Zichem became part of the county of Nassau-Dillenburg.

Before the outbreak of the Eighty Years' War, Zichem was a thriving town. During the siege of Zichem in 1578 by Alexander Farnese, almost the entire garrison was killed. In 1580, Zichem was hit by an earthquake which toppled the castle's keep. On October 8, the Staatsen retook Zichem. In 1599, a large ignited city fire put a permanent end to the town, and the town was destroyed by the fire.

== Geography ==
The Demer River that flows through the city forms the border between the Kempen region in the north and the Hageland region in the south.

=== Television series ===
The television series Wij, Heren van Zichem was based on several conjoined stories by Ernest Claes. Some of the filming for the series took place in the city.

Two films were also made "De Witte" (1934) by Jan Vanderheyden with a.o. Jef Bruyninckx, and "De Witte van Sichem" by Robbe De Hert (1980).

== Born in Zichem ==
Ernest Claes (1885-1968), writer

Peter Jan Beckx (1795-1887), superior of the Jesuits.

== Gallery ==
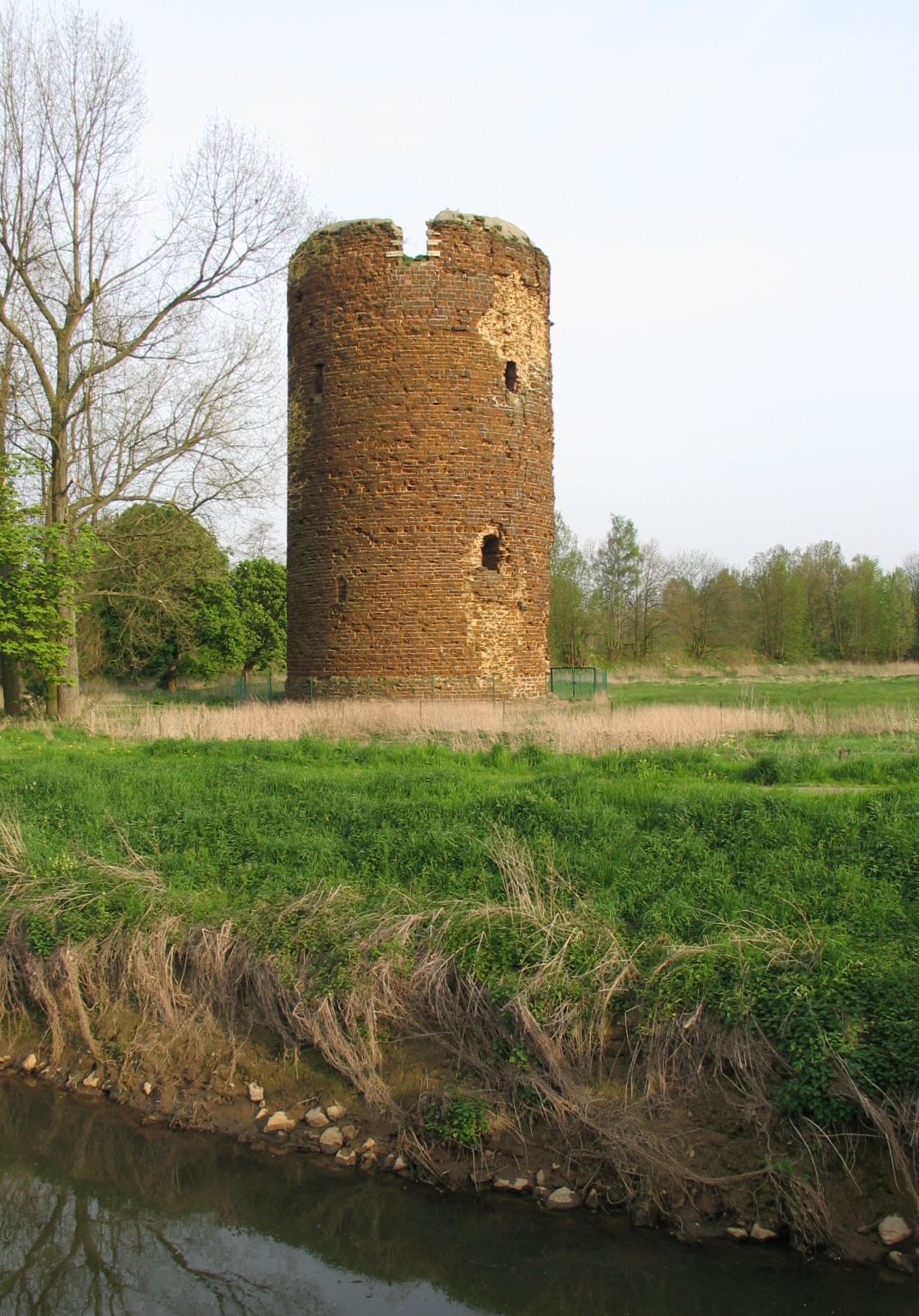
maagdentoren

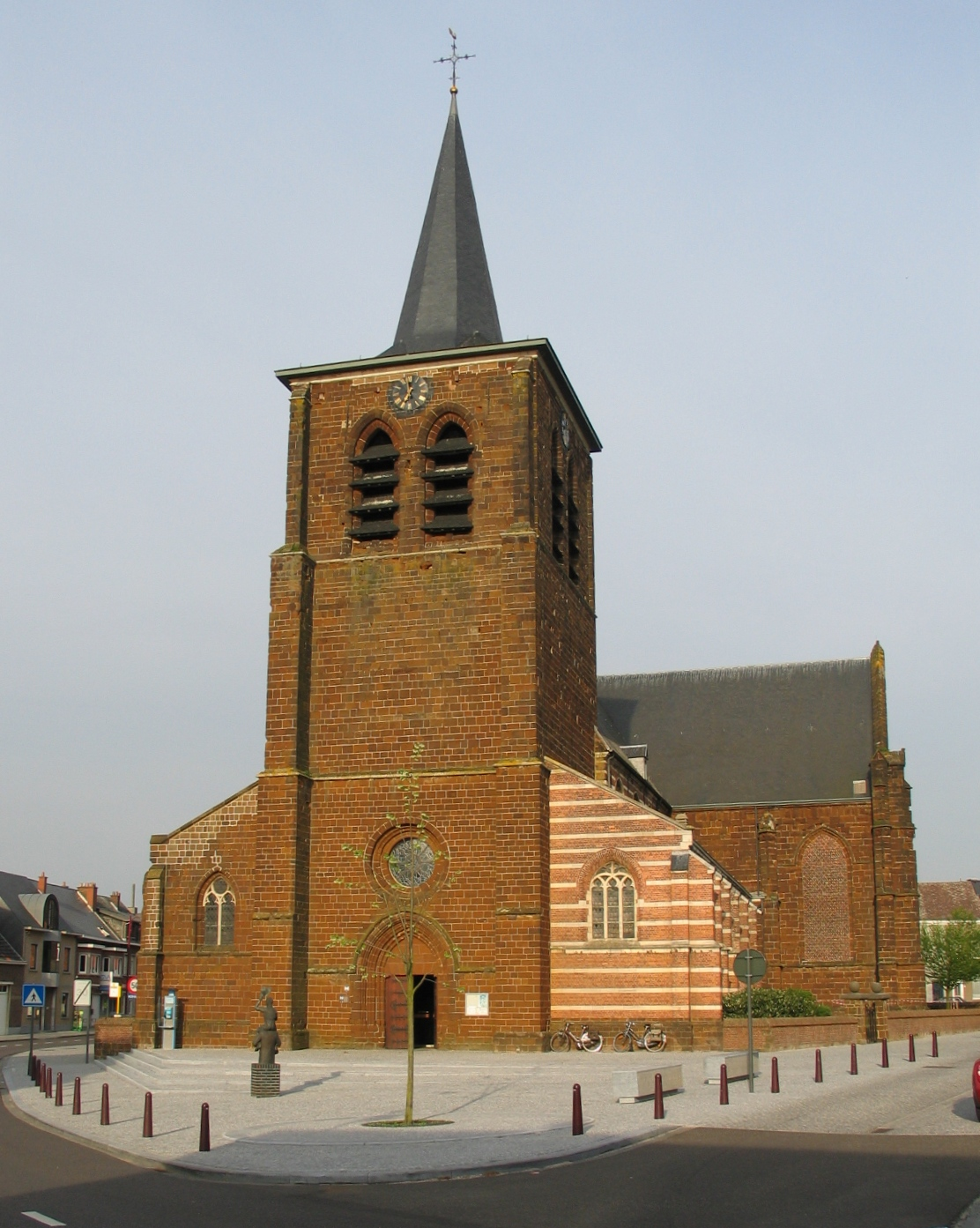
Saint-Eustachius church

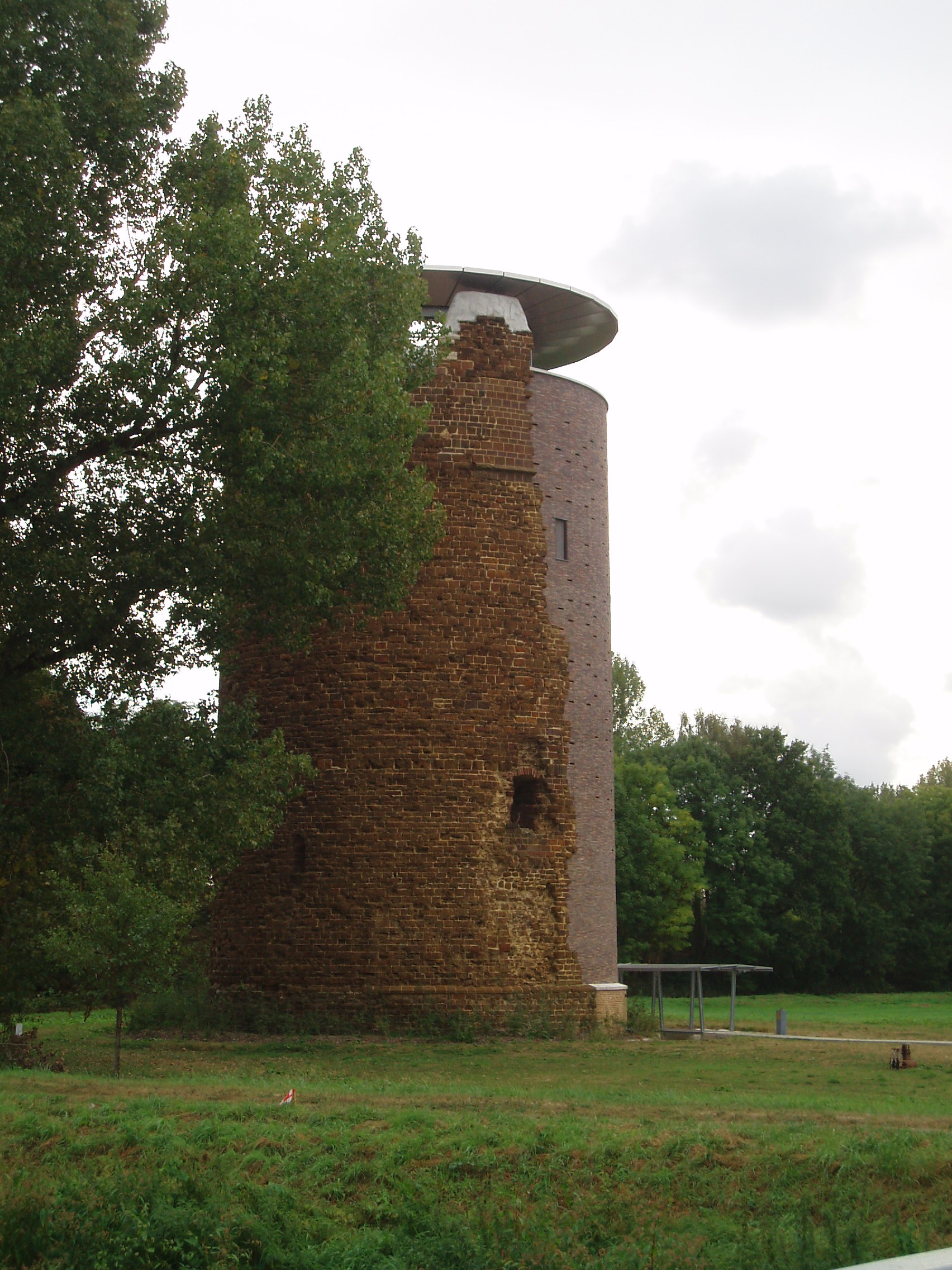
maagdentoren

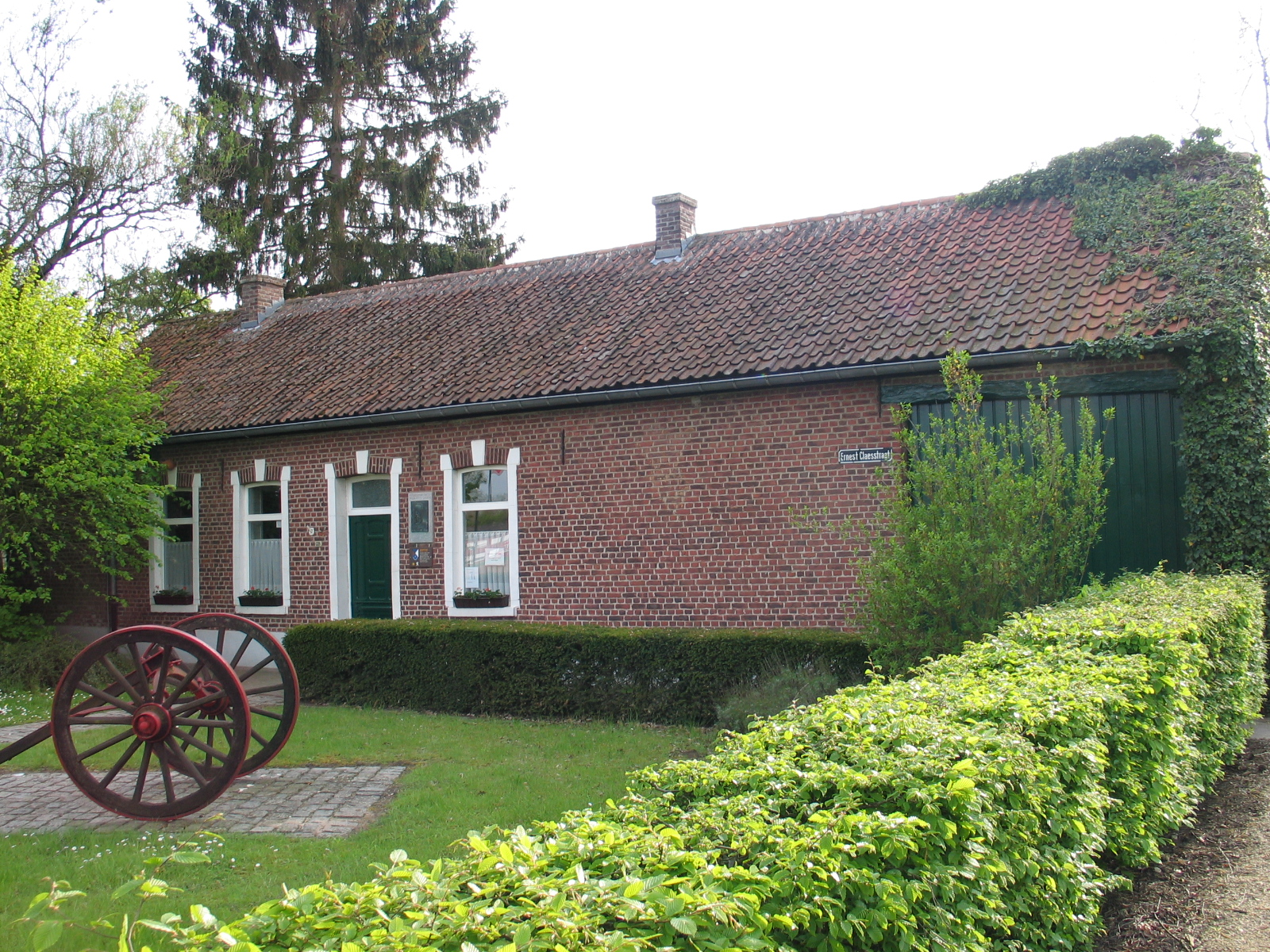
birth house ernest claes

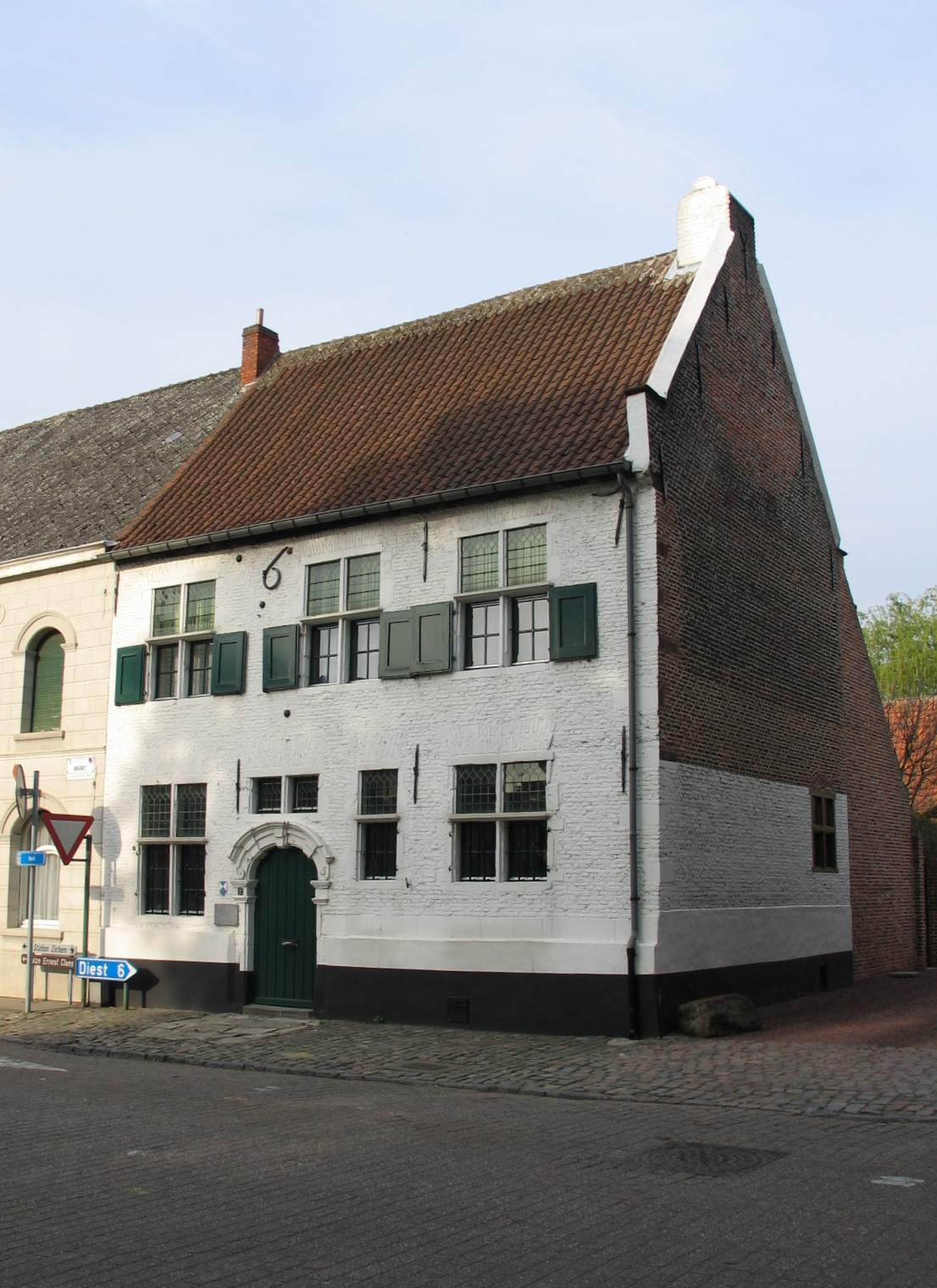
the witpeerd (oldest house in zichem)

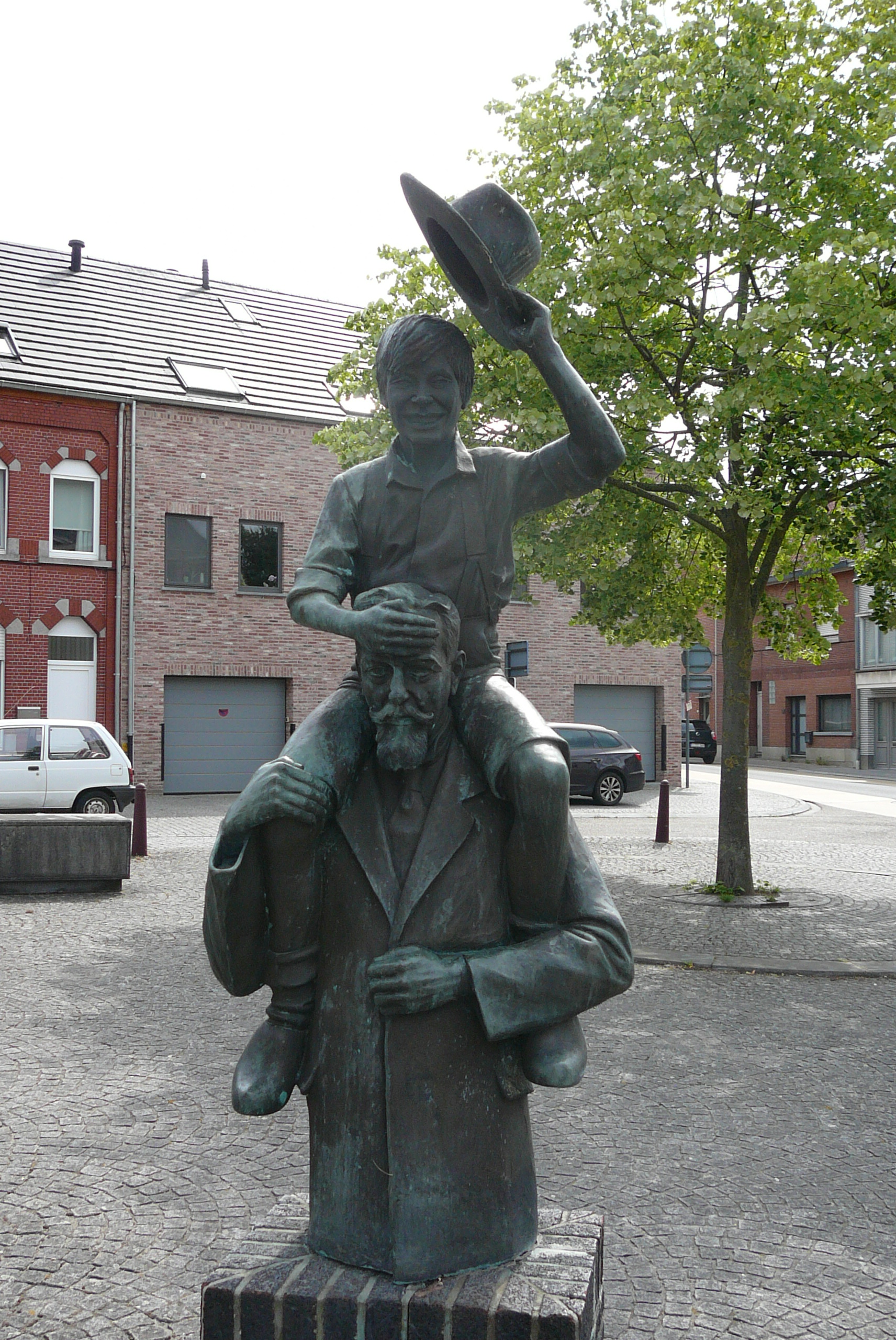
ernest claes and whitey
