= Conscript (disambiguation) =

Conscript or Conscription may refer to:

- Constructed script
- The Conscript, a 1974 Belgian film
- Conscription, the process of drafting a country's population into involuntary labour.
- The ConScript Unicode Registry for coordinating Unicode private-use area assignments.
- Conscript, basic infantry for the Soviet Union in Command & Conquer: Red Alert 2
- Conscript, basic infantry for the Soviet Union in Empires: Dawn of the Modern World
