= De Witte (film) =

- Theatrical release poster
- Directed by: Jan Vanderheyden
- Story by: Edith Kiel
- Based on: Ernest Claes' novel; "De Witte"
- Starring: Jef Bruyninckx; Nand Buyl; Willem Benoy; Magda Janssens; Willem Cauwenberg; Wim De Gruyter; Ida Wasserman; Jules Dirickx
- Production company: Jan Vanderheyden Film
- Release date: 1934
- Running time: 100 minutes
- Country: Belgium
- Language: Dutch

De Witte is a 1934 Belgian film in black and white, directed by Jan Vanderheyden. It is an adaptation of the homonymous book by Ernest Claes.

De Witte was the first Flemish film production with sound and at the same time it was also very successful. Weeks after the première in Antwerp's Cinema Colosseum the public kept coming to the picture.

== Plot ==
The story describes the boyishnesses of Louis Verheyden, a white-haired rascal (usually nicknamed "de witte", meaning "the white one") in Zichem, a village at the countryside; in the film everything happens from the child's perspective.

== Production ==
Edith Kiel added a love story to the original storyline made by Ernest Claes, something the original author did not like. Another aspect with which this time the Church had difficulties was the minimalized role of the village priest. The main role was interpreted by Jef Bruyninckx.

== Remake ==
In 1980, a new version came out, directed by Robbe De Hert and with the Dutch title De Witte van Sichem. The English name of the movie is Whitey.
