= The Silent Hedonist =

1961 film

- Theatrical release poster
- Directed by: Edith Kiel
- Written by: Edith Kiel; Marie-Louise Simons
- Produced by: Edith Kiel
- Starring: Gaston Berghmans; Jef Cassiers; Cois Cassiers; Louisa Lausanne; Polly Geerts
- Cinematography: Paul De Fru
- Edited by: Edith Kiel
- Music by: Jeff Derwey; Rudolf Perak
- Release date: 1961

De Stille Genieter (English title: The Silent Hedonist) is a Belgian comedy film directed, produced, co-written and edited by Edith Kiel. It was her final film.

== Plot ==
Gaston is a simple office worker who is about to get married and has just rented a new apartment. Life seems to smile on him, but then he discovers that his boss is using the flat as a hideout with his girlfriends. Moreover, his two cousins, Jef and Cois Cassiers, try to help him with problems that do not exist.
