= Ernest Claes =

Belgian author

- Born: Andreas Ernestus Josephus Claes; 24 October 1885; Zichem, Belgium
- Died: 2 September 1968 (aged 82); Elsene, Belgium
- Occupations: Playwright, novelist
- Spouse: Stephanie Vetter
- Writing career
- Pen name: G. van Hasselt
- Notable works: De vulgaire geschiedenis van Charelke Dop, De Witte

Andreas Ernestus Josephus Claes (24 October 1885 in Zichem – 2 September 1968 in Elsene) was a Belgian author. He is best known for his regional novels, including De Witte ("Whitey"), which was the source material for the first Flemish sound film: De Witte (1920). In 1980 it was remade as De Witte van Sichem by Robbe De Hert.

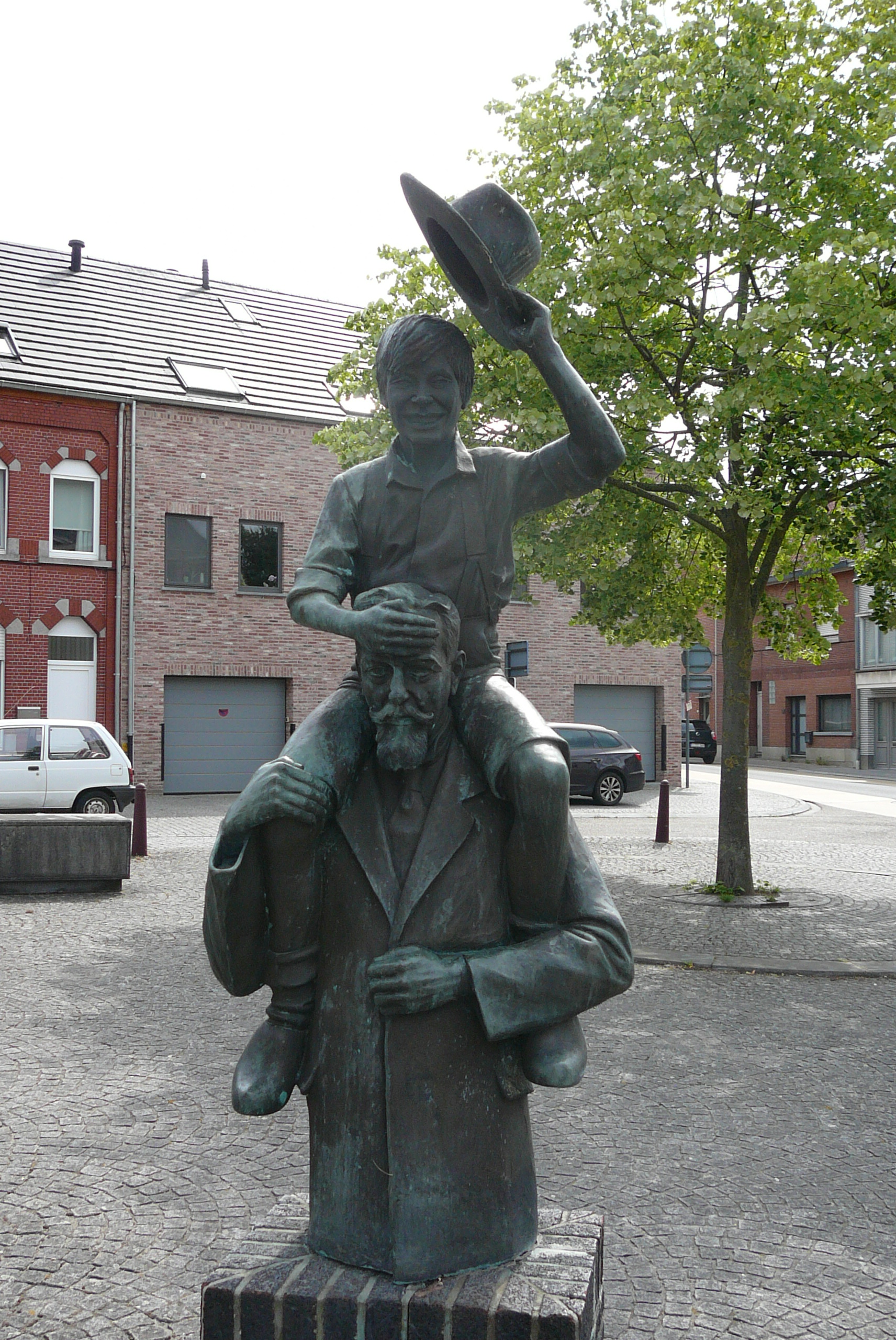
Statue of Ernest Claes & De Witte in Zichem, Belgium

Claes' novels were also adapted into the popular TV series Wij, Heren van Zichem (1969–1972) or miniseries as De vulgaire geschiedenis van Charelke Dop (1985).

Some of his works are written under the pseudonym G. van Hasselt.

He married the Dutch-born writer Stephanie Vetter.

== Works ==
- Naar het kasteel (published in "De Groene Linde") (1905)
- Uit mijn dorpken (1906)
- Het proza van Potgieter (thesis) (1910)
- De fanfare van de Sint-Jansvrienden (1910)
- Uit mijn soldatentijd (1917)
- Bei uns in Deutschland (1919)
- Namen 1914 (1919)
- Oorlogsnovellen (1919)
- De Witte (1920)
- Sichemsche novellen (1921)
- De vulgaire geschiedenis van Charelke Dop (1923)
- Kiki (1925)
- Het leven van Herman Coene (1925-1930)
- Wannes Raps (1926)
- Onze smid (1928)
- De heiligen van Sichem (1931)
- De geschiedenis van Black (1932)
- De wonderbare tocht (1933)
- Kobeke (1933)
- Pastoor Campens zaliger (1935)
- Van den os en den ezel (1937)
- Reisverhaal (1938)
- De moeder en de drie soldaten (1939)
- Clementine (1940)
- Jeugd (1940)
- Langs harde paden (1940)
- Herodes (1942)
- Kerstnacht in de gevangenis (1946)
- De oude moeder (1946)
- Gerechtelijke dwaling (1947)
- De oude klok (1947)
- Jeroom en Benzamien (1947)
- Sinterklaas in de Hemel en op de Aarde (1947)
- Die schone tijd (1949)
- Daar is een mens verdronken (1950)
- Studentenkosthuis 'bij Fien Janssens' (1950)
- Peter en Polly (1950)
- Floere, het Fluwijn (1951)
- Het leven en de dood van Victalis van Gille (1951)
- Cel 269 (1952)
- Voor de open poort (1952)
- De nieuwe ambtenaar (1952)
- Het was lente (1953)
- Ik en mijn lezers (1955)
- Dit is de sproke van broederke Valentijn (1956)
- Twistgesprek tussen Demer en Schelde (1957)
- Ik was student (1957)
- Ik en mijn boeken (1957)
- Leuven, o dagen, schone dagen (1958)
- De mannen van toen (1959)
- Ik en de Witte (1960)
- Voordrachtgevers zijn avonturiers (1962)
- Mijnheer Albert (1965)
- De klanten van pastoor Campens zaliger (1965)
- Daske (1965)
- Schone herinneringen (1966)
- Uit de dagboeken van Ernest Claes (1981)
- Uit de dagboeken van Ernest Claes: het afscheid (1983)

== See also ==
- Flemish literature
- streets named after Ernest Claes
- statues
