= Dora van der Groen =

Belgian actress (1927–2015)

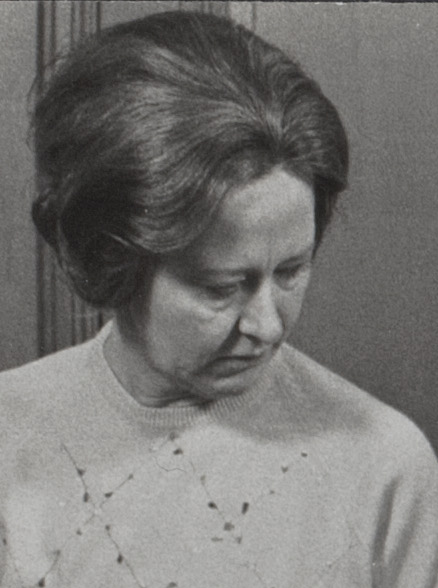
- Van der Groen on a film set in 1973
- Born: 10 March 1927; Antwerp, Belgium
- Died: 8 November 2015 (aged 88); Geel, Belgium
- Occupations: Actress; Theatre director
- Years active: 1945–2003

Dora van der Groen (10 March 1927 – 8 November 2015) was a Belgian actress and theatre director.

She appeared in more than 120 films and television shows between 1945 and 2003. She played Vrouw Coene in Wij, Heren van Zichem and starred in the 1975 film Dokter Pulder zaait papavers, which was entered into the 26th Berlin International Film Festival. She spent her later years in a nursing home, and died in 2015 at the age of 88.

== Partial filmography ==
- Baas Ganzendonck (1945)
- Seagulls Die in the Harbour (1955) - Prostituée
- Vuur, liefde en vitaminen (1956) - Jessy Labroche
- Wat doen we met de liefde? (1957) - Lottie
- Het geluk komt morgen (1958) - Olga
- The Man Who Had His Hair Cut Short (1966) - Beata Tyszkiewicz (voice)
- Monsieur Hawarden (1968) - Mw. Deschamps
- The Deadly Trap (1971)
- Malpertuis (1971) - Sylvie Dideloo
- Ieder van ons (1971)
- Het dwaallicht (1973) - Mevrouw Laarmans
- Rolande met de bles (1973) - Coleta
- Camera sutra (of de bleekgezichten) (1973) - Moeder
- Dakota (1974) - Mary
- Kind van de zon (1975) - Mother
- Keetje Tippel (1975) - Moeder André (uncredited)
- Dokter Pulder zaait papavers (1975) - Mevrouw Mies
- The Arrival of Joachim Stiller (1976) - Madame Frans
- Rubens (1977) - Infante Isabella
- Het verleden (1982) - Mw. Van der Putte
- Alleen (1982) - Vrouw
- De vlaschaard (1983) - Barbele
- Jan zonder vrees (1984) - (voice)
- De aardwolf (1985) - Moeder van Nora
- L'été provisoire (1985) - La scénariste
- De vulgaire geschiedenis van Charelke Dop (1985) - Eufrazie
- Dagboek van een Oude Dwaas (1987) - Alma / Zuster-nurse
- Havinck (1987) - Moeder Lydia
- The Abyss (1988) - Greete
- Jan Rap en z'n maat (1989) - Dokter Jo
- Eline Vere (1991) - hospita
- Minder dood dan de anderen (1992) - Mother
- Antonia's Line (1995) - Allegonde
- Dandelion Game (1998) - Kerkkoorleidster
- S. (1998) - Grandmother
- Film 1 (1999) - Moeder Van Buren
- Mariken (2000) - Zwarte Weeuw
- Pauline and Paulette (2001) - Pauline Declercq
- Villa des Roses (2002) - Mrs. Gendron
