= Anton Peters =

Belgian actor and director

- Born: 2 October 1923; Ekeren, Belgium
- Died: 2 September 1989 (aged 65); Knokke, Belgium
- Occupation: actor

Anton Peters (2 October 1923 – 2 September 1989) was a Belgian actor.

He was born in Ekeren. On 13 June 1944 he was arrested by the German occupiers in Norway. He was imprisoned at Møllergata 19 from 13 to 17 July 1944, and then at Grini concentration camp until 24 December 1944.

After the war, starting in the 1950s, he had an extensive filmography as an actor, and also appeared in tens of television series. He was also a prolific director.

He was the father-in-law of Marleen Maes and grandfather of Wim Peters, both actors. He died in September 1989 in Knokke.

He acted in several Belgian television series and movies such as De vulgaire geschiedenis van Charelke Dop, Tijl Uilenspiegel and De Paradijsvogels. Peters, employed at the Vlaamse Radio- en Televisieomroeporganisatie, directed a documentary about the Dutch singer Mary Porcelijn in which she acted naked, although she used a stand in. It was the first fully naked woman ever shown on Belgian television. There were so many complaints by viewers that the broadcasting company had no other choice than to fire Peters.

In 1971, Peters provided Flemish commentary in the Eurovision Song Contest for BRT.

== Filmography ==
Year	Title	Role	Notes
1954	De hemel op aarde		Voice
1976	De komst van Joachim Stiller	Clemens Waalwijk	
1986	Exit-exil	Eigenaar nachtclub	(final film role)
