= De vulgaire geschiedenis van Charelke Dop =

1923 novel written by Ernest Claes

- Book cover of the third print, 1928
- Author: Ernest Claes
- Language: Flemish
- Publisher: Kompas
- Publication date: 1923
- Publication place: Belgium

De vulgaire geschiedenis van Charelke Dop, (The vulgar history of Charelke Dop), is a novel written by Ernest Claes in 1923.

== Synopsis ==
It is World War I. Charelke Dop lives in the Belgian municipality Diest. He pretends to be poor but is rather rich. After his wife Angelina dies he moves to Brussels. Charelke is a manipulative, lying, stingy, immoral but charming widower. He earns a lot of money by declaring people to the German soldiers although he is a smuggler, traitor and blackmailer. He convinces highly placed Belgians that he performed acts of valour (whilst it were only misdeeds) and thus receives medals of honour and an accompanying ceremony.

== Miniserie adaption ==
The book was adapted for screen in a miniserie of two episodes in 1985 by the Belgian national television station BRT.

=== Cast ===
- Jef Burm as Charelke Dop
- Denise De Weerdt as Sefie
- Jacky Morel as Lewie Serezo
- Christel Domen as Trezeke
- Doris Van Caneghem as Roos
- Anton Cogen as priest
- Leo Rozenstraten as Gustaaf
- Gerda Marchand as Rozelien
- Lea Cousin as revue singer
- Greta Van Langendonck as revue singer
- Yvonne Mertens as Kermelie
- Katrien Devos as Nette Gordijn
- Ugo Prinsen as Jan Kweddel
- Max Schnur as Lamme Glas
- Emmy Leemans as Isabelle
- Marc Bober as Jan Tamboer
- Gilda De Bal as Boeboeske
- Bert André as Gille
- Dora Van Der Groen as Eufrazie
- Machteld Ramoudt as Leontine
- Anton Peters as baron Bidoul
- Gust Van Opbergen as Roger Bolders
