= Louisa Lausanne =

Belgian actress

Louisa Lausanne (1891–1964) was a Belgian film actress.

== Selected filmography ==
- Met den helm geboren (1939)
- Janssens tegen Peeters (1939)
- Janssens en Peeters dikke vrienden (1940)
- Antoon, de flierefluiter (1942)
- Schipperskwartier (1953)
- De stille genieter (1961)

== Bibliography ==
- Thys, Marianne. Belgian Cinema. Royal Belgian Film Archive, 1999.
