= Remplacement =

French and Belgian conscription policy

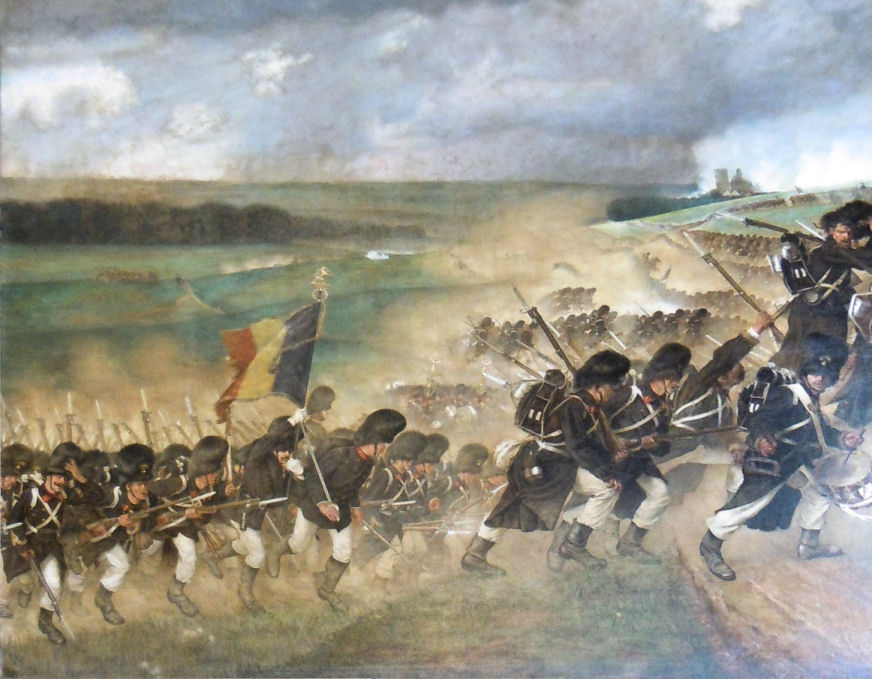
The majority of non-career soldiers in the Belgian army of the nineteenth century were selected under the remplacement system

Remplacement militaire (French; lit. 'military replacement') was a system of military conscription which existed in France and Belgium in the 19th century under which citizens selected for military service by lot were entitled to pay a sum of money, originally enough to pay a substitute to volunteer to serve in their place, to exempt them from being required to serve in the military personally. Although considered an important civic liberty, the policy favoured the rich and was detrimental to military efficiency. It was abolished in Belgium in 1913 and replaced by a system of "personal military service" (service militaire personnel): a form of universal conscription.

== History ==
=== Policy ===
The Belgian army relied on both voluntary enlistment and, from 1902, also on recruitment by lot in order to keep its numbers constant. Both the Liberals and Catholics advocated Remplacement as a way of privileging the aristocratic and bourgeois classes and were united in defending it against reformers.

=== Abolition ===
The Belgian response to the Franco-Prussian War of 1870-1 highlighted the inadequacies of the country's military to defend its borders. The system of remplacement was viewed as an anachronism, constituting an unfair privilege for the wealthy and reducing the quality of the army's recruits. King Leopold II was particularly keen that the system be abolished and used his political influence to try to persuade politicians to support reform. Major-General Guillaume, Minister of War and a former aide de camp to the king, pushed for the government to adopt a policy of personal military service, and resigned from the cabinet on 10 December 1872 when it would not. With both major political factions united in favour of Remplacement, and only the Belgian Workers' Party in favour, reform was delayed.

The system was finally abolished in 1909, to be replaced by system whereby one son per family would be eligible for conscription into the army. In 1913, Albert I finally managed to have a bill passed through parliament instituting compulsory conscription for all adult males over the age of 20.

== See also ==
- The Conscript - 1974 film based on an eponymous novel by Hendrik Conscience which features remplacement as its central plot device
