= Stephanie Vetter =

Johanna Maria Stephanie Claes-Vetter (February 25, 1884 – October 9, 1974) was a Dutch-born novelist in Belgium who wrote in Dutch.

She was born Johanna Maria Stephanie Vetter in Zutphen and married Flemish writer Ernest Claes. Vetter was an advocate for women's rights in Flanders. From 1909 to 1914, she was co-editor of the women's literary magazine De Lelie. She published her first novel Eer de mail sluit (Before the mail closes) in 1915. In 1927, a collection of short stories Verholen krachten (Hidden forces) was published.

She died in Elsene at the age of 90.

== Selected works ==
- Als de dagen lengen (When the days lengthen) (1940)
- Haar eigen weg (Her own way) (1944)
- Martine - een ontgoocheling (Martine - a disappointment) (1954)
- Angst (1960)
