= Wij, Heren van Zichem =

- DVD cover of season 1
- Genre: Drama series.
- Written by: Ernest Claes
- Directed by: Maurits Balfoort
- Country of origin: Belgium
- Original language: Dutch
- No. of episodes: 26

Original release
- Network: B.R.T. (nowadays the VRT)
- Release: 1969 – 1972

Wij, Heren van Zichem (We, Gentlemen of Zichem) was a Flemish TV drama series, originally broadcast between 1969 and 1972 in 26 episodes on the BRT (nowadays the VRT). The program was based on several novels by Ernest Claes, who died just a few months before the show first aired. All episodes were shot in the Flemish village Zichem. At the time it was one of the most popular TV series in Flanders, attracting almost 2,960,000 viewers which is about 3/4 of all Flemish people. Tourism to the village boomed, while it hardly had enough bars, let alone restaurants to accommodate the tourists. In a 2004 interview with Het Nieuwsblad actor Fons Exelmans (who played the Witte) remembered that tourists were often confused because certain houses and buildings were located less close to each other than in the series. The actors were also invited to appear during annual festivities as promotional stunts.

Wij, Heren Van Zichem has been repeated several times since. The show was also broadcast on Dutch television.

In 1971 it won Humo's Prijs van de Kijker ("Humo's Viewers' Award").

An audio play record based on the series was released on vinyl in 1970.

== Cast ==
- Pastoor Munte: Luc Philips
- Moeder Cent: Jenny Tanghe
- De Witte: Fons Exelmans
- Jef de smid: Robert Marcel
- Vrouw Coene: Dora van der Groen
- Boer Coene: Bob Storm
- Herman Coene: Jo De Meyere
- Wannes Raps: Gaston Vandermeulen
- Elza van Berckelaer: Denise Zimmerman
- Rozelien: Martha Dewachter
- Clementine: Jenny Van Santvoort
- Meneerke Parmentier: Frans Vandenbrande
- Fien Janssens: Ann Petersen
- Frans Hofkens: Walter Moeremans
- Gabrielle: Rita Lommée
- Liza Mettes: Greta Verniers
- Notaris Dutry: Jacques Aubertin
- Schoolmeester Baekelandt: Michel Vanattenhoven
- Victalis van Gille: Miel Vanattenhoven
- Fons Coene: Jacky Morel
- Broos Aspelagh: Walter Cornelis
- Geert Boonejan: Ray Verhaeghe
- Bet Kek: Jan Reussens
- Dries: Lode Van Beek
- Dokter Volders: Piet Bergers
- Sepke: Bernard Verheyden
- Niske: Roger Bolders
- Peerke Grune: Jan Muës
- Koster Fideel: Maurits Goossens

== In popular culture ==
The TV series was referenced twice in the Belgian comics series The Adventures of Nero. Meneer Pheip says in the album "Magelaan 2" (1971) that he prefers watching Wij, Heren van Zichem, while the Maasai doctor Zongo in "Zongo in the Kongo" (1971) also happens to own a TV set in the middle of the jungle where he watches Wij, Heren van Zichem.
