= Roland Verhavert =

Belgian film director (1927–2014)

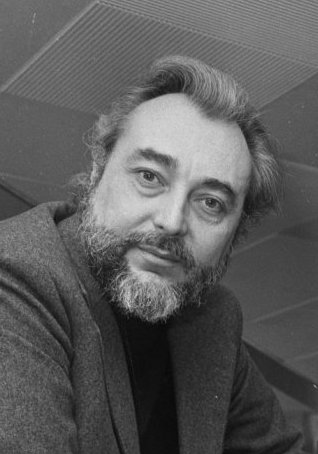
- Born: 1 May 1927; Melsele, Belgium
- Died: 26 July 2014 (aged 87); Melsele, Belgium
- Occupation: Film director
- Years active: 1955–1993

Roland Verhavert (1 May 1927 – 26 July 2014) was a Belgian film director. He directed 44 films between 1955 and 1993. He co-directed the 1955 film Seagulls Die in the Harbour, which was entered into the 1956 Cannes Film Festival. His 1974 film The Conscript was entered into the 24th Berlin International Film Festival.

Verhavert died of a heart attack aged 87 in July 2014.

== Selected filmography ==
- Seagulls Die in the Harbour (1955)
- The Conscript (1974)
- Rubens (1977)
- Brugge, die stille (1981)
