= Seagulls Die in the Harbour =

1955 film

- Film poster
- Directed by: Rik Kuypers; Ivo Michiels; Roland Verhavert
- Written by: Rik Kuypers; Ivo Michiels; Roland Verhavert
- Produced by: Bruno De Winter
- Starring: Tine Balder
- Cinematography: Johan Blansjaar
- Edited by: Raymonde Beaudoux
- Music by: Jack Sels and Max Damasse
- Release date: 1955
- Running time: 94 minutes
- Country: Belgium
- Language: Dutch

Seagulls Die in the Harbour (Dutch: Meeuwen sterven in de haven) is a 1955 Belgian drama film directed by Rik Kuypers, Ivo Michiels and Roland Verhavert. The soundtrack was composed by Jack Sels. The film was entered into the 1956 Cannes Film Festival. It was restored in 2025 and screened in the Cannes Classics section of the festival.

== Plot ==
An unnamed vagabond wanders through Antwerp, visiting a woman who lives aboard a German boatman's ship moored in the harbor. The vagabond presses the boatman for work aboard his ship, but the boatman refuses on account of the vagabond's lack of identity papers and funds. The vagabond is then seen loitering in an open field, where he meets a precocious Francophone 6-year old named Gigi. He establishes a bond with Gigi, meeting her every day in the fields to play ball while Gigi's adoptive sister sneaks around with her boyfriend.

Presenting his life story as a fairytale, the vagabond tells Gigi that his wife was preparing to leave him for an American soldier in the wake of the liberation of Belgium in 1944. In a fit of rage, the vagabond murdered his wife and is now on the run from the law. Later, the vagabond is seen shambling through an Antwerp street, nearly fainting from fatigue and hunger. A sex worker takes pity on him and offers him a place to stay, but her pimp intervenes and admonishes her for taking in the vagabond. The pimp propositions for the vagabond to kidnap Gigi, who is allegedly the heiress to a fortune, and deliver her to him in exchange for safe passage out of Belgium. The vagabond initially accepts and leads Gigi to a desolate shed, but he reneges on the agreement when he learns that the German boatman has finally agreed to let him stow away on his ship.

The vagabond returns to try and get Gigi home, but she refuses to leave the shed because she's unhappy with her adoptive family, who eventually arrive with the police in tow. An officer recognizes the vagabond as a wanted man. The vagabond flees on foot, starting an elaborate police chase through the Antwerp harbor. Cornered by several officers, the vagabond begins a shootout and is killed by police gunfire in turn. Further away, the German ship departs, the woman aboard crying as she wonders what befell the vagabond.

== Cast in order of appearance ==
- Tine Balder as the boatman's wife
- Tone Brulin as the pimp
- Alice De Graef
- Jenny Deheyder
- Piet Frison as the boatman
- Désiré Kaesen
- Robert Kaesen (as Bob Kaesen)
- Gisèle Peeters as the orphan girl (as Gigi)
- Eric Peter
- Marcel Philippe
- Julien Schoenaerts as the stranger
- Paul S'Jongers
- Panchita Van de Perre
- Dora van der Groen as the sex worker
- Albert Van der Sanden
- Miriam Verbeeck
- Geneviève Wayenbergh
