= Schipperskwartier =

District in Antwerp

- Interactive map of Schipperskwartier
- Coordinates: 51.22565°N 4.40473°E
- Country: Belgium
- Region: Flanders
- Province: Antwerp
- Municipality: Antwerp

Schipperskwartier (Seamen's quarter) is a historic neighbourhood in the city of Antwerp, Belgium, known primarily as the city's red-light district. The district is located close to the old port and north of the historic centre of Antwerp. Associated with prostitution for centuries, it has been the focus of urban renewal in the twenty-first century.

== History ==
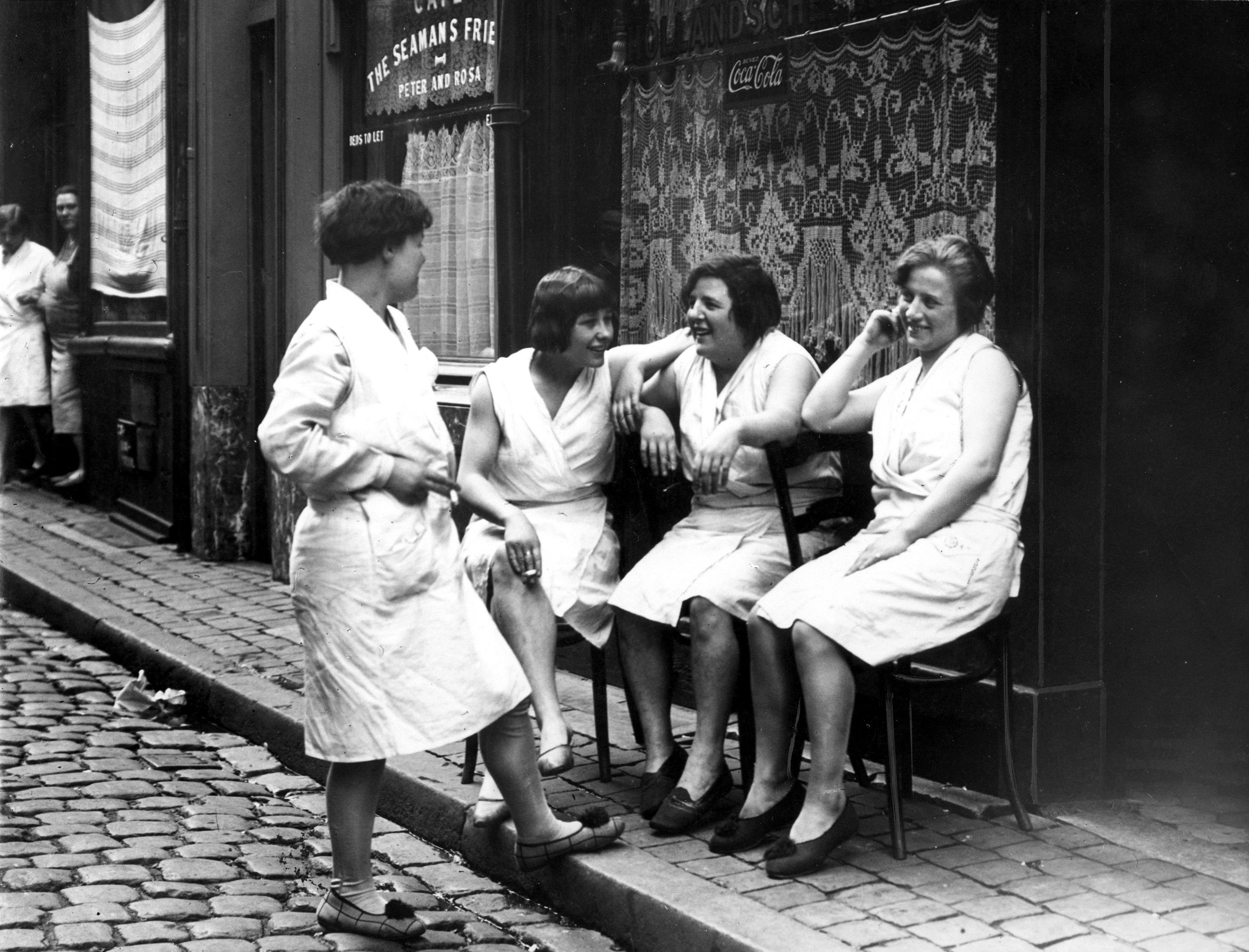
Prostitutes in Schipperskwartier in 1929

According to the historian Floris Prims, Schipperskwartier became associated with prostitution in 1403, when the city of Antwerp restricted prostitutes to Guldenberg, beside the River Scheldt. By the late nineteenth century, Antwerp had become one of Europe's major ports and Schipperskwartier was home to 84 lodging houses which provided accommodation for sailors and dockworkers. The area, which was already home to people of many different nationalities, saw an influx of Greeks in the second half of the twentieth century, with Greek bars, cafés, and nightclubs with live bouzouki music catering to an increasing number of Greek sailors. The 1980s saw the arrival in the Schipperskwartier of increasing numbers of sex workers from the Philippines, the Dominican Republic, Brazil and Africa, followed, after 1989, by Eastern Europeans. By the 1990s, there were over 240 windows in Antwerp, most of them in seventeen streets in the Schipperskwartier, and about 4,000 cars driving through the area every night. The increase in prostitution was accompanied by an increase in trafficking, organised crime and violence.

== Urban renewal ==
In 1998, residents of Schipperskwartier, who were concerned about the numbers of prostitutes and associated criminal activity in the area, presented a petition to the city council. This led the council to confine window prostitution to a zone of tolerance consisting a triangle of three streets, Schippersstraat, Vingerlingstraat and Verversrui.. Regulations were introduced to improve conditions for sex workers and minimise the impact on residents. Streets were pedestrianised and over €10 million invested in a regeneration scheme. Outside of the zone of tolerance, Schipperskwartier has been transformed into a residential area, mixing social housing with upmarket lofts, cafés and restaurants.

== In popular culture ==
- The 1861 novel In ’t Schipperskwartier (1861) by Jan Lambrecht Domien Sleeckx is set in Schipperskwartier.
- The novel On Black Sisters Street by Chika Unigwe features women who work in Schipperskwartier.
- Schipperskwartier, a 1953 film directed by Edith Kiel, is a comedy set in the district.
- 't Schipperskwartier, a comedy by Dirk Van Vooren and Manu Jacobs, premiered in the Fakkeltheater in Antwerp in 2025.
