= Rik Kuypers =

Belgian film director (1925–2019)

- Born: 11 April 1925; Mortsel, Belgium
- Died: 21 May 2019 (aged 94); Lima, Peru
- Occupation: Film director
- Years active: 1947–1981

Rik Kuypers (11 April 1925 – 21 May 2019) was a Belgian film director. He directed 29 films between 1947 and 1981. He co-directed the film Seagulls Die in the Harbour, which was entered into the 1956 Cannes Film Festival.

== Selected filmography ==
- Seagulls Die in the Harbour (1955)
