= The Conscript =

1974 film

- Theatrical release poster
- Directed by: Roland Verhavert
- Written by: Nic Bal; Roland Verhavert; Hendrik Conscience (novel)
- Produced by: Jan van Raemdonck
- Starring: Jan Decleir
- Cinematography: Ralf Boumans
- Release date: 28 February 1974
- Running time: 93 minutes
- Country: Belgium
- Language: Dutch

The Conscript (Dutch: De loteling) is a 1974 Belgian drama film directed by Roland Verhavert, based on the eponymous 1850 novel by Hendrik Conscience. It was entered into the 24th Berlin International Film Festival. It was also selected as the Belgian entry for the Best Foreign Language Film at the 47th Academy Awards, but was not accepted as a nominee.

== Plot ==
The Conscript is set in rural Flanders in Belgium in the early 19th century. After the son of a local notable is conscripted into the Belgian Army, he pays Jan Braems, a poor farmer's boy, to volunteer for military service in his place under the system of remplacement. Braems serves in the Army. He visits a prostitute and contracts venereal disease which he attempts to cure by washing his eyes with own urine causing him to go blind. His girlfriend refuses to part from him, however, in spite of the circumstances.

== Cast ==
- Jan Decleir as Jan Braems
- Ansje Beentjes as Katrien
- Gaston Vandermeulen as Grootvader
- Gella Allaert as Katriens moeder
- Bernard Verheyden as Karel
- Idwig Stéphane as Korporaal
- Eddy Asselbergs as Boef (I)
- Leo Madder as Boef (II)
- Denise Zimmerman as Vrouw van kommandant
- Rudi Van Vlaenderen as Dokter
- Johan Vanderbracht as Kommandant
- Gilbert Charles
- Werner Kopers as Maris
- Marieke van Leeuwen as Hoertje

== See also ==
- List of submissions to the 47th Academy Awards for Best Foreign Language Film
- List of Belgian submissions for the Academy Award for Best Foreign Language Film
