= Janssens tegen Peeters =

- Theatrical release poster
- Directed by: Jan Vanderheyden
- Written by: Hendrik Caspeele; Edith Kiel; Jan Vanderheyden
- Produced by: Jan Vanderheyden
- Starring: Charles Janssens; Louisa Lausanne; Jef Bruyninckx; Toontje Janssens
- Cinematography: Ernst Mühlrad
- Edited by: Edith Kiel
- Music by: Gerard Horens; J. Antoon Zwijsen
- Production company: Jan Vanderheyden-Film
- Release date: 1939
- Country: Belgium
- Language: Dutch

Janssens tegen Peeters is a 1939 Belgian comedy film directed by Jan Vanderheyden and starring Charles Janssens, Louisa Lausanne and Jef Bruyninckx. A sequel Janssens en Peeters dikke vrienden was released the following year.

== Cast ==
- Charles Janssens - Tist Peeters
- Louisa Lausanne - Melanie Peeters
- Jef Bruyninckx - Tony Peeters
- Toontje Janssens - Grootvader Peeters
- Pol Polus - Stan Janssens
- Nini De Boël - Juliette Janssens
- Martha Dua - Simonne Janssens
- Louisa Colpeyn - Wieske Peeters
- Gaston Smet - Fred Janssens
- Nand Buyl - Polleke
- Serre Van Eeckhoudt - Oom Frans
- Helena Haak - Tante Net
- Fred Engelen - Zangleraar
- Mitje Peenen - Marie meid van Janssens
- Lily Vernon - Juffrouw Anna
