= Rubens (film) =

1977 film

- DVD cover
- Directed by: Roland Verhavert
- Written by: Hugo Claus
- Produced by: Jörg A. Eggers
- Starring: Johan Leysen
- Cinematography: Walter Kindler
- Release date: 2 October 1977
- Running time: 260 minutes
- Country: Belgium
- Language: Dutch

Rubens: Painter and Diplomat (Dutch: Rubens, schilder en diplomaat) is a 1977 Belgian drama film directed by Roland Verhavert. The film was selected as the Belgian entry for the Best Foreign Language Film at the 50th Academy Awards, but was not accepted as a nominee.

== Cast ==
- Eddy Asselbergs as Olivares
- Robert Borremans as Velasquez
- Eddie Brugman as Peter Pourbus
- Domien De Gruyter as Nicolaas II Rockox
- Johan Leysen as Rubens
- Ann Petersen as Marie de Medicis
- Hugo Van Den Berghe as Adriaen Brouwer
- Frans Van den Brande as Hertog van Lerma
- Joris Van den Eynde as Filips
- André van den Heuvel as Caravaggio
- Martin Van Zundert as Richelieu
- Lucas Vandervost as Jacob Jordaens

== See also ==
- List of submissions to the 50th Academy Awards for Best Foreign Language Film
- List of Belgian submissions for the Academy Award for Best Foreign Language Film
