= Louisa Colpeyn =

Belgian actress

- Born: 24 February 1918; Antwerp, Belgium
- Died: 26 January 2015 (aged 96)
- Occupation: Actress
- Years active: 1939-1983

Louisa Colpeyn (24 February 1918 – 26 January 2015) was a Belgian actress. She appeared in more than thirty films from 1939 to 1983. Colpeyn was the mother of writer Patrick Modiano.

== Filmography ==
Year	Title	Role	Notes
1939	Janssens tegen Peeters	Wieske Peeters	
1939	Een engel van een man	Stella	
1940	Wit is troef	Netty	
1940	Janssens en Peeters dikke vrienden	Wieske Janssens	
1941	Veel geluk, Monika	Monika	
1949	Rendezvous in July	Madame Courcel	
1954	Les hommes ne pensent qu'à ça	La comtesse russe	
1955	Marguerite de la nuit	La comtesse russe	Uncredited
1956	Coup dur chez les mous	La comtesse Olga Ivaroff	
1957	Les Collégiennes		
1960	Le cercle vicieux	Frieda Wromberg	
1961	The Passion of Slow Fire	Lorraine Shermann - la mère de Belle / Belle's Mother	
1964	Bande à part	Madame Victoria	
1968	Marry Me! Marry Me!	Mrs. Schmoll	
1969	Erotissimo	La mère d'Annie / Mother	
1972	Sex-shop	La belle-mère / Mother-in-law	
1976	Boomerang	Madame Feldman	
1978	On peut le dire sans se fâcher	Mell Desmarais	
