= Alfred Machin (director) =

French actor and film director

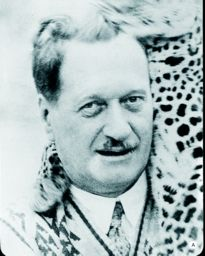
- Born: Eugène Alfred Jean-Baptiste Machin; 20 April 1877; Blendecques, Pas-de-Calais, France
- Died: 16 June 1929 (aged 52); Nice, France
- Occupations: Actor and Film Director

Alfred Machin (20 April 1877 – 16 June 1929) was a French actor and film director. He is remembered for having been one of the few French film directors whose films expressed progressive tendencies prior to World War I. He was also a pioneer of aerial filming. After 1920 Alfred Machin devoted himself to films of animals.

Machin started his career as a press photographer for the magazine L'illustration. He was then recruited by the film production company Pathé, which sent him to Africa in 1907, where he particularly made a large number of short films on wild animals.

In 1909, Pathé sent Machin to The Netherlands to film scenes of Dutch life. In 1912, he was sent to Belgium, where he took part in setting up Pathé's foreign subsidiary Belge Cinéma Film and directed a number of films, including Belgium's first feature film, Le Diamant noir (:fr), and the anti-war film Maudite soit la guerre.

During World War I, Machin took part in establishing the Photographic Service of the French Army, while continuing working for Pathé, which produced films for it. He shot some scenes of the French trenches that were used by D.W. Griffith in Hearts of the World. He directed a one-off horror film, The Manor House of Fear, in 1927, which it is thought was released theatrically by Universal Pictures in the United States.

After the war, Machin created a film studio in Nice, to which a small zoo was attached, where he kept wild animals used in his productions. He died in 1929 as a result of an injury inflicted by a panther during the shooting of a film.

Machin directed 156 films, of which 32 are preserved.

== Selected filmography ==
Le Moulin maudit (1909)

- 1909: Le Moulin maudit (:fr)
- 1911: Le Dévouement d'un gosse (:fr)
- 1913: Le Diamant noir (:fr)
- 1914: La Fille de Delft AKA La Tulipe d'or (:fr)
- 1914: Maudite soit la guerre
- 1924: The Heirs of Uncle James
- 1927: The Manor House of Fear (starring Romuald Joube)
