= Ivo Michiels =

Belgian writer (1923–2012)

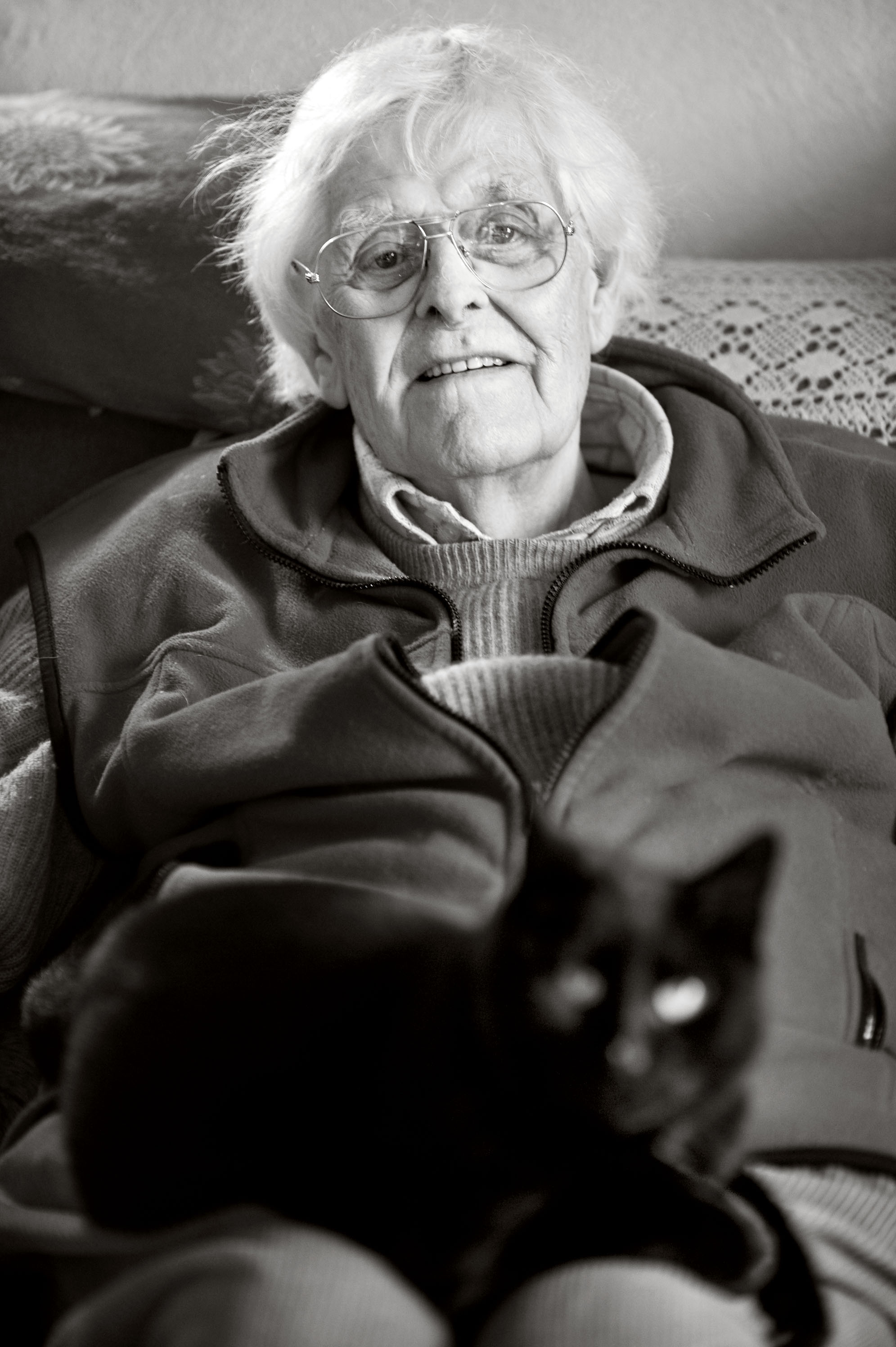
- Born: Henri Ceuppens; 8 January 1923; Mortsel, Belgium
- Died: 7 October 2012 (aged 89); Le Barroux, France
- Occupation: Writer
- Writing career
- Pen name: Ivo Michiels
- Notable work: Seagulls Die in the Harbour
- Notable awards: Ark Prize of the Free Word; 1958

Henri Paul René Ceuppens (8 January 1923 – 7 October 2012), who wrote under the pseudonym Ivo Michiels, was a Belgian writer.

== Biography ==
Michiels was born in Mortsel. During World War II he was employed as a nurse in a hospital in Lübeck in Germany. He worked as a laboratory assistant for a while, and from 1948 up to 1957 he worked as a journalist at Het Handelsblad. In 1965, he married Christiane Faes. From 1957 up to 1978 he worked at the publisher Ontwikkeling (E: Development).

From 1959 until 1983 he was editor, and editorial secretary of the Nieuw Vlaams Tijdschrift. From 1966 up to 1978 he also taught at the Hoger Rijksinstituut voor Toneel- en Cultuurspreiding in Brussels. In 1979, he established himself as a full-time writer in the Vaucluse (France). He died, aged 89, in Le Barroux.

== Awards ==
- 1958 – Arkprijs van het Vrije Woord for Het afscheid.
- 1977 – Prijs van de Vlaamse Gemeenschap voor Proza—then named Driejaarlijkse Staatsprijs voor verhalend proza—for Een tuin tussen hond en wolf
- 1990 – Emile Bernheim-prijs for his works
- 1993 – Prijs van de Vlaamse Gemeenschap
- 2012 – America Award from The Contemporary Arts Educational Project "for his lifetime contribution to international writing". Previous winners of this "alternatif Nobel Prize in Literature" were, amongst others, Harold Pinter (1995), Peter Handke (2002), José Saramago (2004) en Javier Marías (2010)

== List of works ==
- Begrensde verten (1946, poetry)
- Daar tegenover (1947, poetry)
- Zo, ga dan (1947, novelle)
- Het vonnis (1949, novel)
- Kruistocht der jongelingen (1951, novel)
- Spaans capriccio (1952, short storie)
- De ogenbank (1953, novel)
- De meeuwen sterven in de haven (1955, novel, films cenario), made into a film of the same name in 1956
- Het afscheid (1957, novel)
- Journal brut, Ikjes sprokkelen (1958, novel)
- Albisola Mare, Savona (1959, novel)
- Dertien Vlamingen (1961, bloemlezing)
- Het boek Alfa (1963, novel)
- Frans Dille (1963, essay)
- Antwerpen, stad aan de stroom (tekst bij fotoalbum van F. Tas) (1965)
- Verhalen uit Journal brut (1966)
- Het afscheid (1966, film scenario)
- Orchis militaris (1968, novel)
- Exit (1971, novel)
- Jef Verheyen, 40 (1972, bibliophile edition)
- Alechinsky (1973, essay)
- Samuel, o Samuel (1973, radio play)
- Dieric Bouts (1975, film scenario)
- Een tuin tussen hond en wolf (1977, novel, film scenario)
- Itinerarium (1979, essay)
- Dixi(t) (1979, novel)
- Luister hoe dit beeld hoe die lijn hoe die kleur hoe dit vlak luister (1979, essays)
- Een letterwerker aan het woord (1980)
- De vrouwen van de aarstengel (1983, novel)
- De toverberg in Sank Seb (1984, uit "De vrouwen van de aartsengel", in "Vlaamse verhalen na 1965")
- Het boek der nauwe relaties (1985)
- Vlaanderen, ook een land (1987)
- Prima materia (1989)
- Ondergrond bovengronds (1991)
- Schildwacht schuldwacht (1993)
- Daar komen scherven van (1995)
- Sissi (1997)
- De verrukking (1999, novel)
- De mirakelen, Elizabeth, de mirakelen (?)

== See also ==
- Flemish literature
- Woman Between Wolf and Dog
