= Maudite soit la guerre =

- Directed by: Alfred Machin
- Written by: Alfred Machin
- Starring: Baert, Suzanne Berni, Fernand Crommelynck, Nadia D'Angely, Henri Goidsen, Albert Hendrickx
- Cinematography: Jacques Bizeul(fr)
- Release date: 1 May 1914
- Running time: 50 minutes
- Country: Belgium
- Language: French

Maudite soit la guerre (French: Damn the War) is a 1914 Belgian silent anti-war film directed and scripted by Alfred Machin, starring Baert. The film shows how war destroys love and friendship through the story of two friends obliged to fight each other as pilots in the Air Force of their respective (unnamed) countries. The film, released just before the beginning of World War I, is one of the oldest anti-war films ever made and includes a remarkable anticipation of aerial warfare.

== Plot ==
Adolphe, a student pilot, is training at the aviation school of a neighbouring land, where he is staying at the house of his friend Sigismond. He falls in love with Sigismond's sister Liza. When a war breaks out between their two countries, Adolphe is forced to go home and the two men are enlisted in their respective Air Forces. Adolphe makes several successful missions, destroying in particular a number of gas balloons, until Sigismond attacks his plane and forces him to land. Both are killed in the ensuing fight, unaware of their identities. Lieutenant Maxime, who had witnessed Sigismond's death, visit his parents to pay tribute to their son. He is strongly impressed by Liza. One year later, he ask for Liza's hand. During a walk in a forest, Liza recognises the four leaf clover medal that he is wearing, which belonged to Adolphe. He tells her how he took it from the body of the enemy pilot who had killed Sigismond. Liza runs away, contemplating suicide. She finally decides to retire in a convent but is unable to forget her lost love.

== Cast ==
Suzanne Berni

- Baert as Adolphe Hardeff
- Suzanne Berni as Liza Modzel
- Fernand Crommelynck as Monsieur Modzel
- Nadia D'Angely as Madame Modzel
- Henri Goidsen as Lieutenant Maxime

== Production and release ==
The film was shot in Belgium in 1913. It has a very high production value, with the reconstitution of ground and aerial fights which were made possible thanks to the support of the Belgian Armed Forces, notably the precursor of the Belgium Air Force, the Compagnie des Aviateurs, created on 16 April 1913. It made available a number of men, horses, weapons, gas balloons and planes.

The film premièred on 1 May 1914 in Brussels.

== Restoration ==
Maudite soit la guerre

The film was restored in 2014 by the Royal Belgian Film Archive in collaboration with the EYE Film Institute Netherlands, and the support of the Bibliothèque Nationale de France and Gaumont-Pathé Archives, based on two stencil-coloured prints and a black and white print.

This is the version available here, with Dutch and English intertitles and no soundtrack.
