= André Cauvin =

Belgian film director

- Born: 12 February 1907; Ixelles, Belgium
- Died: 2 April 2004 (aged 97)
- Occupation(s): Film director Screenwriter; Film producer
- Years active: 1939–1955

André Cauvin (French: [kovɛ̃]; 12 February 1907 – 2 April 2004) was a Belgian documentary film director. He directed five films between 1939 and 1955. His 1952 film Bongolo was entered into the 1953 Cannes Film Festival.

== Filmography ==
- Nos soldats d'Afrique (1939)
- Congo (1945)
- L' Équateur aux cent visages (1948)
- Bongolo (1952)
- Bwana Kitoko (1955)
