= Jef Bruyninckx =

Belgian actor, editor and director

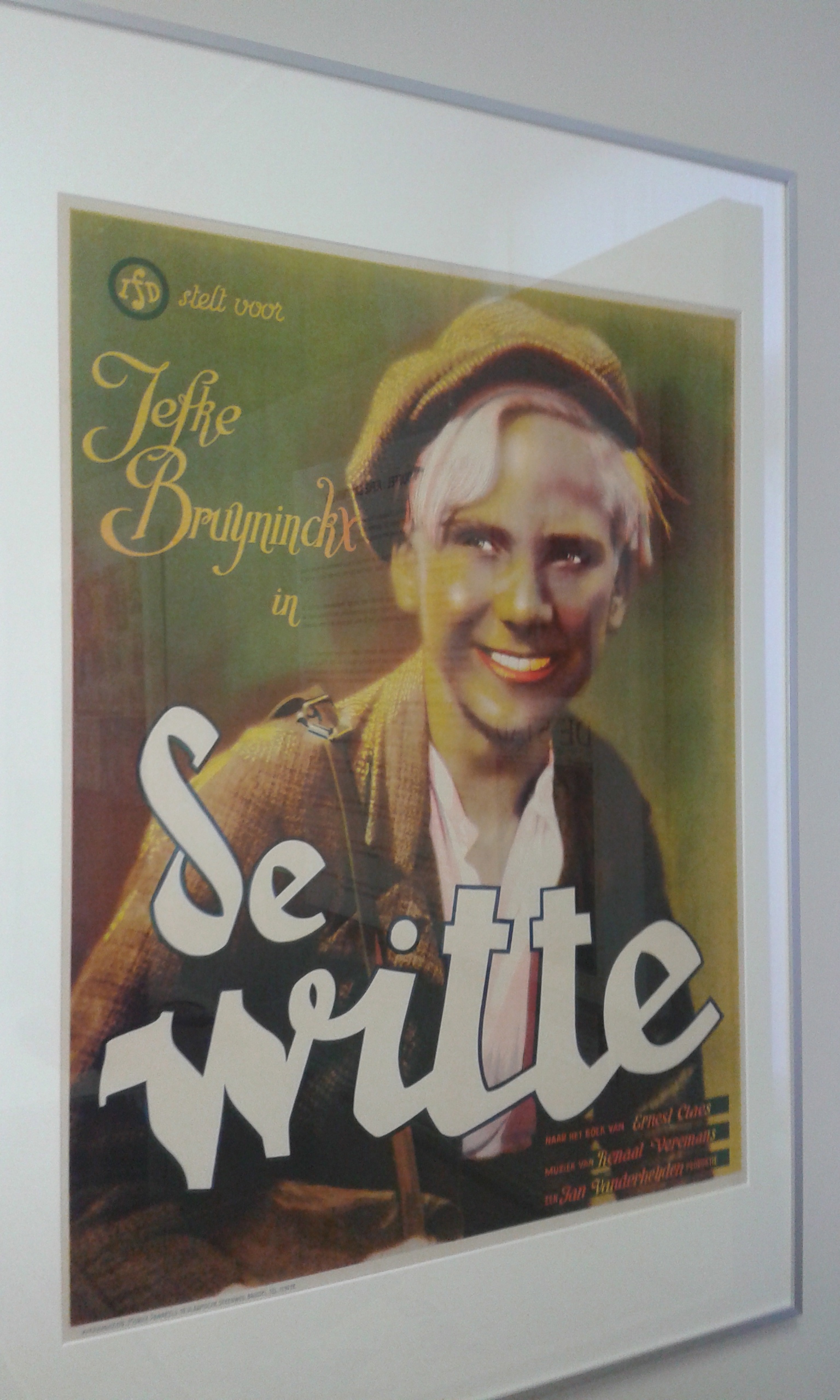
De Witte - Jefke Bruyninckx

Jef Bruyninckx (13 January 1919 – 15 January 1995) was a Belgian film actor, editor and director.

== Selected filmography ==
Actor

- De Witte (1934)
- Alleen voor U (1935)
- Janssens tegen Peeters (1939)
- Janssens en Peeters dikke vrienden (1940)

Editor

- Monsieur Wens Holds the Trump Cards (1947)

== Bibliography ==
- Mathijs, Ernest. The Cinema of the Low Countries. Wallflower Press, 2004.
