= Edith Kiel =

Edith Kiel (30 June 1904 – 12 September 1993) was a German film producer, screenwriter, editor and director who worked mainly in the Flemish section of the Belgian film – industry. After starting out at Germany's largest studio, UFA, she moved to Belgium where she worked alongside her husband Jan Vanderheyden.

== Selected filmography ==
=== Director ===
- Een aardig geval (1941)
- Schipperskwartier (1953)
- Een zonde waard (1959)
- De stille genieter (1961)

=== Screenwriter ===
- De witte (1934)
- Alleen voor U (1935)
- Uilenspiegel leeft nog (1935)
- De wonderdokter (1936)
- Havenmuziek (1937)
- Drie flinke kerels (1938)
- Met den helm geboren (1939)
- Janssens tegen Peeters (1939)
- Een engel van een man (1939)
- Wit is troef (1940)
- Janssens en Peeters dikke vrienden (1940)
- Veel geluk, Monika (1941)
- Een aardig geval (1941)
- Antoon, de flierefluiter (1942)
- De stille genieter (1961)

=== Film Editor ===
- Havenmuziek (1937)
- Drie flinke kerels (1938)
- Met den helm geboren (1939)
- Janssens tegen Peeters (1939)
- Een engel van een man (1939)
- Wit is troef (1940)
- Janssens en Peeters dikke vrienden (1940)
- De stille genieter (1961)

=== Art Director ===
- De stille genieter (1961)

== Sources ==
- Mathijs, Ernest. The Cinema of the Low Countries. Wallflower Press, 2004.
