= Jan Vanderheyden =

Belgian film producer and director

Jan Vanderheyden (10 October 1890 – 27 March 1961) was a Belgian film producer and director known for the Flemish comedies he made in the 1930s and 1940s. During the German occupation of Belgium between 1940 and 1944, he produced four of the six films made by Belgian companies in a market that was otherwise flooded by imported German films.

Vanderheyden hoped to benefit from the Flamenpolitik instituted by the Germans, as Belgian cinema had traditionally been dominated by English and French language films. Vanderheyden made his last film in 1942, after which Belgian feature film production was suspended due to an increasing shortage of film stock.

He was married to the German producer/director Edith Kiel with whom he frequently worked.

== Selected filmography ==
Director

- De witte (1934)
- Alleen voor U (1935)
- Uilenspiegel leeft nog (1935)
- De wonderdokter (1936)
- Havenmuziek (1937)
- Drie flinke kerels (1938)
- Janssens tegen Peeters (1939)
- Een engel van een man (1939)
- Met de helm geboren (1939)
- Janssens tegen Peeters (1940)
- Wit is troef (1940)
- Janssens en Peeters dikke vrienden (1940)
- Veel geluk Monica (1941)
- Veel geluk, Monika (1942)
- Antoon, de flierefluiter (1942)

== Bibliography ==
- Winkel, Roel Vande & Welch, David. Cinema and the Swastika: The International Expansion of Third Reich Cinema. Palgrave MacMillan, 2011.
