= Al Mancini =

American actor (1932–2007)

- Born: Alfred Benito Mancini; November 13, 1932; Steubenville, Ohio, U.S.
- Died: November 12, 2007 (aged 74); London, Ohio, U.S.
- Occupations: film/stage/television actor, writer
- Years active: 1959–2005
- Spouse(s): Carlyn Clayton (1973-19??; divorced); Denny Dayviss (1965-19??; divorced)

Alfred Benito "Al" Mancini (November 13, 1932 – November 12, 2007) was an American stage, television and film actor, born in Steubenville, Ohio.

== Acting career ==
He was a 1950 graduate of London High School in London, Ohio. He was a 1954 Kent State University graduate.

In 1960, he appeared in Ted Flicker's improvisational group The Premise Off-Broadway, and transferred with the show to the Comedy Theatre in London's West End. From there, he graduated to writing and performing for the British satire show That Was the Week That Was (popularly known as TW3) on BBC television, for producer Ned Sherrin and David Frost. Staying in London for several years, his foremost film role was as Tassos Bravos in Robert Aldrich's The Dirty Dozen (1967), and he later reunited with one of his co-stars Ben Carruthers in the 1968 film To Grab the Ring. Also in 1967 he appeared as the Announcer in The Prisoner episode 'The General'. In 1968 he played the villain in the cult episode Six Days of the spy-fi Department S. In 1970, he appeared as Lieutenant Andy Conroy in the UFO episodes "The Cat with Ten Lives" and "Mindbender". In 1974, on British television, he played Captain Harry Nugent in the second series of BBC's Colditz and Le Fevre in episode "Entente Cordiale" of Special Branch.

He returned to the United States in the mid-1970s, appearing in several films including Miller's Crossing (1990), Loose Cannons (1990), The Public Eye (1992) and Falling Down (1993). His last role, in 2005, was on an episode of Joan of Arcadia. He taught acting for over 30 years at the Beverly Hills Playhouse, and wrote for television.

== Personal life ==
Mancini was married and divorced twice. He died of Alzheimer's disease on November 12, 2007, in London, Ohio.

== Filmography ==
Year	Title	Role	Notes
1965	The Dirty Game		
1967	The Dirty Dozen	Tassos Bravos	
1968	To Grab the Ring	David Knight	
1968	Department S	Andre Durrës	
1968	Don't Raise the Bridge, Lower the River	Portuguese Chauffeur	
1971	Welcome to the Club	Private Marcantonio	
1972	Madame Sin	Fisherman	
1972	Go for a Take	'South American' Director	
1975	De dwaze Lotgevallen van Sherlock Jones	Don Rattazzi	
1985	Turk 182	Irate Man On TV	
1986	Agent on Ice	Tony "Uncle Tony"	
1987	The Delos Adventure	Koutsavaki	
1988	Big Business	The Waiter	
1990	Loose Cannons	Man Tenant	
1990	Mission Manila	Costelo	
1990	Far Out Man	Fresno Detective	
1990	Miller's Crossing	"Tic-Tac"	
1992	The Public Eye	Camera Shop Clerk	
1993	Falling Down	Jim, The Golfer	
1994	My Summer Story	Zudoc, The Old Man's Fishing Buddy	
1998	Babe: Pig in the City	Fish	Voice
1999	The Joyriders	Older Man At Movie	
2002	Mid-Century	Dr. Werner	
