= The Butterfly Lifts the Cat Up =

1994 film

- Theatrical release poster
- Directed by: Willeke van Ammelrooy
- Written by: Carel Donck; Sander Vos
- Produced by: Willeke van Ammelrooy
- Starring: Arjan Kindermans; Marjolein Beumer; Rik Launspach; Karla Wieringa; Joost van Hezik; Jules Croiset; Josée Ruiter; Duco Luitse
- Cinematography: Eduard van der Enden
- Edited by: Denise Janzee
- Music by: Maarten Hartveldt
- Production companies: Stichting De Vlinder; NCRV
- Distributed by: Cinemien
- Release date: 10 November 1994
- Country: Netherlands
- Language: Dutch

The Butterfly Lifts the Cat Up or De Vlinder Tilt de kat op is a 1994 Dutch film directed by Willeke van Ammelrooy.

== Cast ==
- Arjan Kindermans ... David
- Marjolein Beumer ... Linda
- Rik Launspach ... Anton
- Karla Wieringa ... Marjan
- Joost van Hezik ... Robert
- Jules Croiset ... huisarts
- Duco Luitse ... Alexander
- Josée Ruiter ... wijkverpleegster
- Marnix Kappers ... zanger
- Hugo Vanex ... pianist
- Yolanda Zwartjes ... barvrouw
- Eugene Reisser ... zwerver
- Peter Vos ... zwerver
- Paul van der Plas ... bouwvakker
- Dennis Overweg ... bouwvakker
- Bas van de Berg ... Kleine Henk
