= List of submissions to the 47th Academy Awards for Best Foreign Language Film =

1974 Best Foreign Language Film submissions

Highlights
- Oscar winner: (Italy) Amarcord
- Submissions: 20
- Debuts: none

This is a list of submissions to the 47th Academy Awards for Best Foreign Language Film. The Academy Award for Best Foreign Language Film was created in 1956 by the Academy of Motion Picture Arts and Sciences to honour non-English-speaking films produced outside the United States. The award is handed out annually, and is accepted by the winning film's director, although it is considered an award for the submitting country as a whole. Countries are invited by the Academy to submit their best films for competition according to strict rules, with only one film being accepted from each country.

For the 47th Academy Awards, nineteen films were submitted in the category Academy Award for Best Foreign Language Film. The five nominated films came from Argentina, France, Hungary, Italy and Poland.

Italy won for the tenth time with Amarcord by Federico Fellini, which was also nominated for Best Director and Best Original Screenplay in the subsequent ceremony (48th Academy Awards).

== Submissions ==
Submitting country	Film title used in nomination	Original title	Language(s)	Director(s)	Result
Argentina	The Truce	La tregua	Spanish	Sergio Renán	Nominated
Belgium	The Conscript	De loteling	Dutch	Roland Verhavert	Not nominated
Brazil	The Scarecrow's Night	A Noite do Espantalho	Brazilian Portuguese	Sérgio Ricardo	Not nominated
Bulgaria	The Last Summer	Последно лято	Bulgarian	Hristo Hristov	Not nominated
Czechoslovakia	Lovers in the Year One	Milenci v roce jedna	Czech	Jaroslav Balík	Not nominated
Denmark	The Olsen Gang's Last Escapade	Olsen-bandens sidste bedrifter	Danish	Erik Balling	Not nominated
Egypt	Where Is My Mind?	أين عقلي	Arabic	Atef Salem	Not nominated
France	Lacombe, Lucien		French, German	Louis Malle	Nominated
West Germany	One or the Other	Einer von uns beiden	German	Wolfgang Petersen	Not nominated
Hungary	Cats' Play	Macskajáték	Hungarian	Károly Makk	Nominated
India	Hot Winds	गरम हवा	Hindi, Urdu	M. S. Sathyu	Not nominated
Italy	Amarcord		Italian	Federico Fellini	Won Academy Award
Japan	The Fossil	化石	Japanese	Masaki Kobayashi	Not nominated
Mexico	Calzonzin Inspector		Spanish	Alfonso Arau	Not nominated
Netherlands	Help! The Doctor Is Drowning	Help, de dokter verzuipt!	Dutch	Nikolai van der Heyde	Not nominated
Poland	The Deluge	Potop	Polish	Jerzy Hoffman	Nominated
Soviet Union	The Ferocious One	Лютый	Russian	Tolomush Okeyev	Not nominated
Spain	La Prima Angelica		Spanish	Carlos Saura	Not nominated
Switzerland	The Middle of the World	Le Milieu du monde	French	Alain Tanner	Not nominated
Yugoslavia	The Dervish and Death	Derviš i smrt	Serbo-Croatian	Zdravko Velimirović	Not nominated

== Notes ==
- Japan submitted The Fossil, but the film was not listed on the official list from AMPAS. It appears likely that the film was not screened.
- The Soviet Union selected The Ferocious One, a film from the Kyrgyz Republic with mostly Russian dialogue.

== Sources ==
- Margaret Herrick Library, Academy of Motion Picture Arts and Sciences
