= Let the Doctor Shove =

- Directed by: Nikolai van der Heyde
- Written by: Nikolai van der Heyde, Martin Simek, Toon Kortooms (novel)
- Produced by: Henk Bos, Robbert Wijsmuller
- Starring: Jo De Meyere, Piet Bambergen, Joop Doderer
- Cinematography: Andrzej Karpinski
- Edited by: Victorine Habets, Paul van den Wildenburg
- Music by: Vladimir Cosma, music of the title song made by Jack Jersey
- Release date: 1980
- Running time: 92 minutes
- Country: Netherlands
- Language: Dutch

Let the Doctor Shove is a 1980 Dutch film directed by Nikolai van der Heyde. The composer and (music) producer of the title song is Jack de Nijs.
