= To Grab the Ring =

1968 film

- Directed by: Nikolai van der Heyde
- Written by: Nikolai van der Heyde; Jan Blokker; George Moorse
- Produced by: John Rosinga
- Starring: Ben Carruthers
- Cinematography: Gérard Vandenberg
- Music by: Frans Meijts
- Release date: 14 March 1968
- Running time: 98 minutes
- Country: Netherlands
- Language: Dutch

To Grab the Ring is a 1968 Dutch film directed by Nikolai van der Heyde. It was entered into the 18th Berlin International Film Festival.

== Cast ==
- Ben Carruthers as Alfred Lowell, Acteur
- Françoise Brion as Hélène
- Liesbeth List as Sandra van Dijk
- Al Mancini as David Knight
- Vladek Sheybal as Mijnheer Smith
- Edina Ronay as Vriendin
- Dunja Rajter
- John Van de Rest
- Jan Vreeken as Gangster
- Joop Admiraal
- Cox Habbema
- Melvin Clay as Anush
- Ko Koedijk
- Simon van Collem

== See also ==
- List of Dutch films
