= Barbara Hershey =

American actress (born 1948)

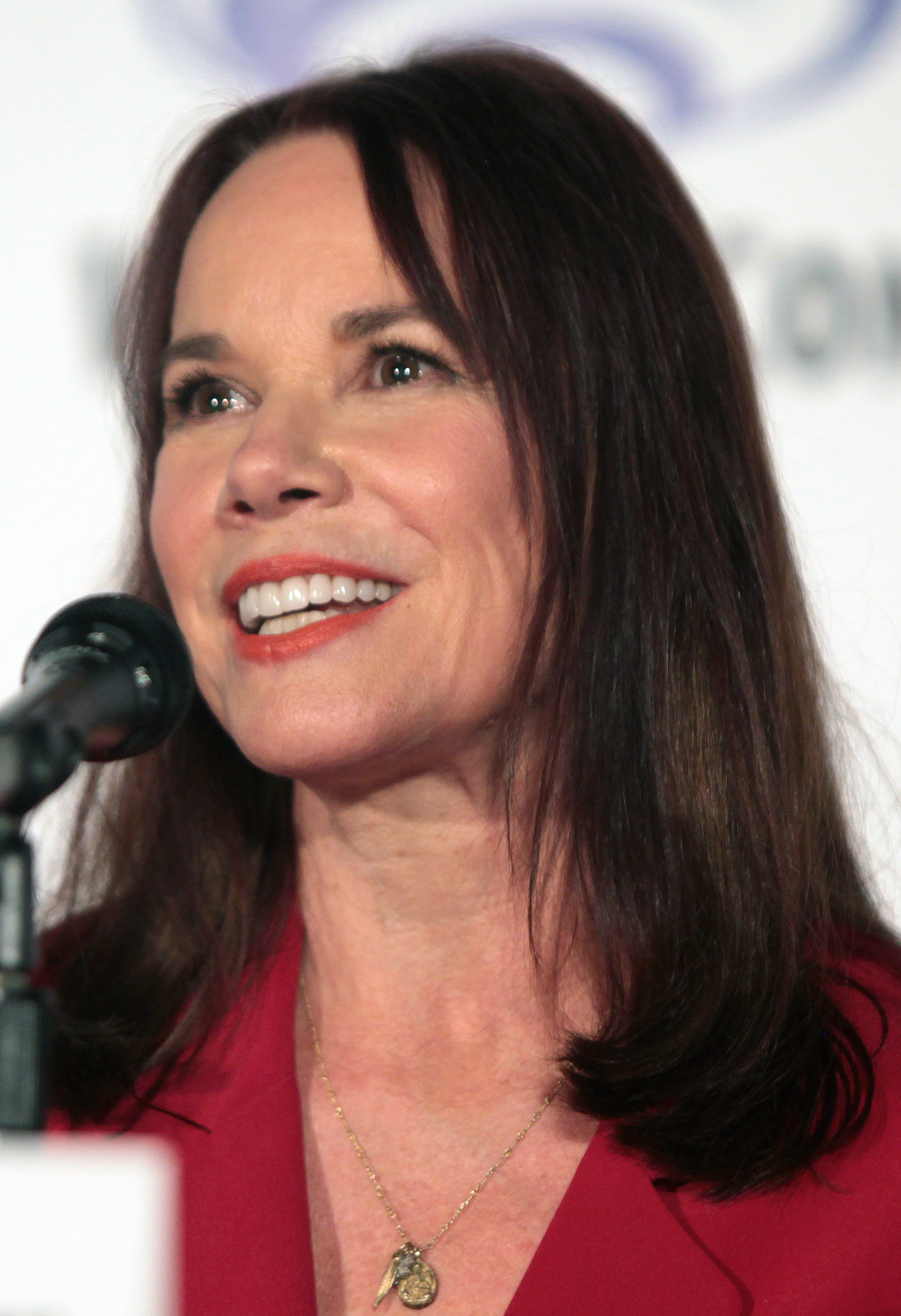
- Hershey in 2016
- Born: Barbara Lynn Herzstein; February 5, 1948 (age 78); Los Angeles, California, U.S.
- Other name: Barbara Seagull
- Occupation: Actress
- Years active: 1965–present
- Spouse: Stephen Douglas (m. 1992; div. 1993)
- Partner(s): David Carradine (1968–1975); Naveen Andrews (1998–2009)
- Children: 1

Barbara Lynn Herzstein, better known as Barbara Hershey (born February 5, 1948), is an American actress. In a career spanning more than 50 years, she has played a variety of roles on television and in cinema in several genres, including Westerns, horrors, and comedies. She began acting at age 17 in 1965, but did not achieve widespread critical acclaim until the 1980s. By that time, the Chicago Tribune referred to her as "one of America's finest actresses".

Hershey won an Emmy and a Golden Globe for Outstanding Lead Actress in a Miniseries/TV Film for her role in A Killing in a Small Town (1990). She received Golden Globe nominations for Best Supporting Actress for her role as Mary Magdalene in The Last Temptation of Christ (1988) and for her role in The Portrait of a Lady (1996). For the latter film, she was nominated for an Academy Award for Best Supporting Actress and won the Los Angeles Film Critics Award for Best Supporting Actress. She has won two Best Actress awards at the Cannes Film Festival for her roles in Shy People (1987) and A World Apart (1988). She was featured in Woody Allen's Hannah and Her Sisters (1986), for which she was nominated for the British Academy Film Award for Best Supporting Actress. She starred in Garry Marshall's melodrama Beaches (1988) and earned a second British Academy Film Award nomination for Darren Aronofsky's Black Swan (2010).

Establishing a reputation early in her career as a hippie, Hershey experienced conflict between her personal life and her acting goals. Her career declined during a six-year relationship with actor David Carradine, with whom she had a child. She experimented with a change in stage name to Barbara Seagull. During this time, her personal life was highly publicized and ridiculed. Her acting career was not well established until she separated from Carradine and changed her stage name back to Hershey. In 1990, later in her career, she reportedly began to keep her personal life private.

== Early life ==
Barbara Lynn Herzstein was born in Hollywood, the daughter of Arnold Nathan Herzstein, a horse-racing columnist, and Melrose Herzstein (née Moore). Her father's parents were Jewish immigrants from Hungary and Russia, while her mother, a native of Arkansas, was a Presbyterian of Scots-Irish descent.

The youngest of three children, Barbara always wanted to be an actress, and her family nicknamed her "Sarah Bernhardt". She was shy in school and so quiet that people thought she was deaf. By the age of 10, she proved herself to be an "A" student. Her high-school drama coach helped her find an agent, and in 1965, at age 17, she landed a role on Sally Field's television series Gidget. Barbara said that Field was very supportive of her in her first acting role. According to The New York Times All Movie Guide, Barbara graduated from Hollywood High School in 1966, but David Carradine, in his autobiography, said she dropped out of high school after she began acting.

== Career ==
=== 1960s ===
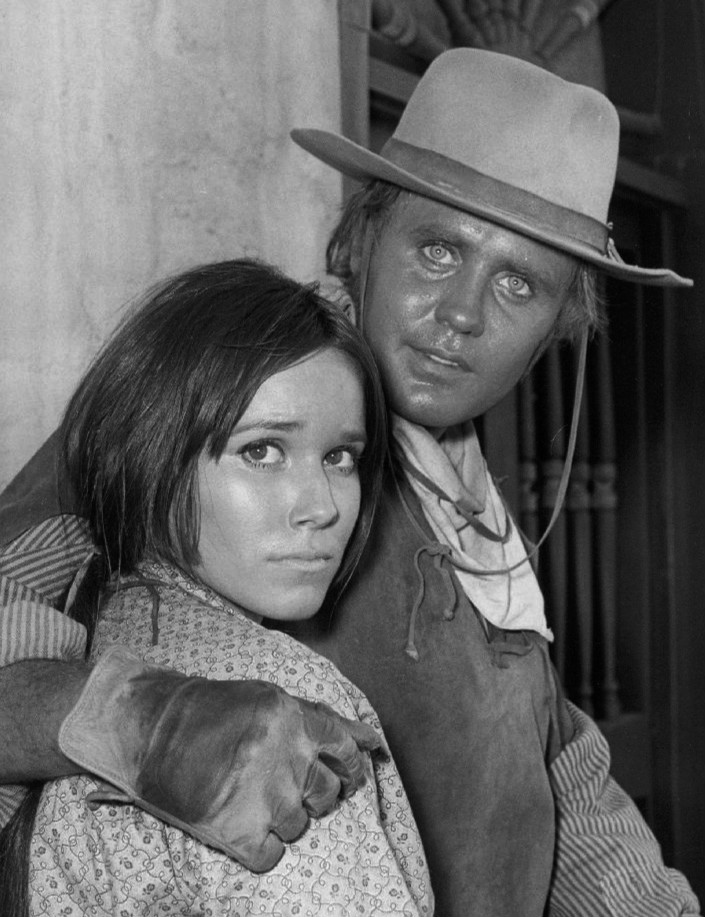
Hershey and Mark Slade in the TV Western The High Chaparral (1968)

Hershey's acting debut, two episodes of Gidget, was followed by the short-lived television series The Monroes (1966), which also featured Michael Anderson Jr. By this point, she had adopted the stage name "Barbara Hershey". Although Hershey said the series helped her career, she expressed some frustration with her role, saying: "One week I was strong, the next, weak". While on the series, Hershey garnered several other roles, including one in Doris Day's final feature film, With Six You Get Eggroll.

In 1968, Hershey worked in the 1969 Glenn Ford Western Heaven with a Gun. On the set, she met and began a romantic relationship with actor David Carradine, who later starred in the television series Kung Fu (see Personal life). In the same year, she acted in the controversial drama Last Summer, which was based on Evan Hunter's eponymous novel. In this film, Hershey played Sandy, the "heavy" who influences two young men (played by Bruce Davison and Richard Thomas) to rape another girl, Rhoda (played by Catherine Burns). Though the film, directed by Frank Perry, received an X rating for the graphic rape scene, Burns earned a Best Supporting Actress Oscar nomination for her performance.

During the filming of Last Summer, a seagull was killed. "In one scene," Hershey explained, "I had to throw the bird in the air to make her fly. We had to reshoot the scene over and over again. I could tell the bird was tired. Finally, when the scene was finished, the director, Frank Perry, told me the bird had broken her neck on the last throw." Hershey felt responsible for the bird's death and changed her stage name to "Seagull" as a tribute to the creature. "I felt her spirit enter me," she later explained. "It was the only moral thing to do." The name change was not positively received. When she was offered a part opposite Timothy Bottoms in The Crazy World of Julius Vrooder (1974) (or Vrooder's Hooch), Hershey had to forfeit half her salary, $25,000, to be billed under the name "Seagull" because the producers were not in favor of the billing.

=== 1970s ===
In 1970, Hershey played Tish Grey in The Baby Maker, a film that explored surrogate motherhood. Criticizing the directing and writing of James Bridges, critic Shirley Rigby said of the "bizarre" film, "Only the performances in the film save it from being a total travesty." Rigby went on to say, "Barbara Hershey is a great little actress, much, much more than just another pretty face."

Hershey once said that starring in Boxcar Bertha (1972) "was the most fun I ever had on a movie." The film, co-starring Hershey's domestic partner, David Carradine, and produced by Roger Corman, was Martin Scorsese's first Hollywood picture. Shot in six weeks on a budget of $600,000, Boxcar Bertha was intended to be a period crime drama similar to Corman's Bloody Mama (1970) or Bonnie and Clyde (1967). Although Corman publicized it as an exploitation piece with plenty of sex and violence, Scorsese's influence made it "something much more". Roger Ebert, of the Chicago Sun-Times, wrote of the film's direction, "Martin Scorsese has gone for mood and atmosphere more than for action, and his violence is always blunt and unpleasant—never liberating and exhilarating, as the New Violence is supposed to be." A pictorial recreating sexually explicit scenes from the movie appeared in Playboy magazine in 1972.

By the mid-1970s, Hershey concluded, "I've been so tied up with David [Carradine] that people have forgotten that I am me. I spend 50 percent of my time working with David." She had, in 1974, guest-starred in a two-part episode of Carradine's television series Kung Fu. She played, under the direction of Carradine, a love interest to his character, Kwai Chang Caine, during his time at the Shaolin temple. She also appeared in two of Carradine's independent directorial projects, You and Me (1975) and Americana (1983), both of which had been filmed in 1973. Her father, Arnold Herzstein, also appeared in Americana.

She publicly acknowledged the desire to be recognized in her own right. Later, in 1974, she did just that, winning a gold medal at the Atlanta Film Festival for her role in the Dutch-produced film Love Comes Quietly.

Later in the decade, Hershey starred with Charlton Heston in The Last Hard Men (1976). She hoped the film would revive her career after the damage she felt it had suffered while she was with Carradine, believing that the hippie label she had been given was a career impediment. By this time, she had shed Carradine and her "Seagull" pseudonym. Throughout the rest of the 1970s, however, she was appearing in made-for-TV movies that were described as "forgettable", like Flood! (1976), Sunshine Christmas (1977), and The Glitter Palace (1977), in which she played a lesbian.

=== 1980s ===
Barbara Hershey in a publicity still from 1981

Hershey landed a role in Richard Rush's The Stunt Man (1980), marking a return to the big screen after four years and earning her critical praise. Hershey felt that she would be forever in debt to Rush for fighting with financiers to allow her a part in that film. She also felt The Stunt Man was an important transition for her, from playing girls to playing women.

Some of the "women roles" that followed The Stunt Man included the horror movie The Entity (1982); Philip Kaufman's The Right Stuff (1983), in which she played Glennis Yeager, wife of test pilot Chuck Yeager; and The Natural (1984), in which she shot Robert Redford's character, inspired by a real-life incident where Ruth Ann Steinhagen shot ballplayer Eddie Waitkus. For the role of Harriet Bird, Hershey had chosen a particular hat as her "anchor". Director Barry Levinson disagreed with her choice, but she insisted on wearing it. Levinson later cast Hershey as the wife of Danny DeVito's character in the comedy Tin Men (1987).

In 1986, Hershey left her native California and moved to Manhattan with her son. Three days later, she met briefly with Woody Allen, who offered her the role of Lee in Hannah and Her Sisters (1986). In addition to a Manhattan apartment, Hershey bought an antique home in rural Connecticut. The Allen picture won three Academy Awards and a Golden Globe. The film also earned Hershey a BAFTA nomination for Best Supporting Actress. She described her part as "a wonderful gift".

Hershey followed Hannah and Her Sisters with back-to-back wins for Best Actress at the Cannes Film Festival for Shy People and for her appearance as anti-apartheid activist Diana Roth in A World Apart (1988). Her character in the latter film was based on Ruth First. Also in the 1980s, she portrayed Errol Flynn's first wife, actress Lili Damita, in the TV movie adaptation of My Wicked, Wicked Ways: The Legend of Errol Flynn (1985), which was based on Flynn's autobiography. She also played the love interest to Gene Hackman's character in the basketball film Hoosiers (1986).

Hershey collaborated with Martin Scorsese again 16 years after Boxcar Bertha in The Last Temptation of Christ (1988) playing the role Mary Magdalene. During the filming of Boxcar Bertha, Hershey had introduced Scorsese to the Nikos Kazantzakis novel on which the latter film was based. That collaboration resulted in an Academy Award nomination for the director and a Golden Globe nod for Hershey.

Barbara Cloud of the Pittsburgh Press gave credit to Hershey for starting a trend when she reportedly had collagen injected into her lips for her role in Beaches (1988). Humorist Erma Bombeck said of the movie, which also starred Bette Midler, "I have no idea what Beaches was all about. All I could focus on was Barbara Hershey's lips. She looked like she stopped off at a gas station and someone said, 'Your lips are down 30 pounds. Better let me hit 'em with some air.'"

=== 1990s ===
In 1990, Hershey won an Emmy and a Golden Globe for Outstanding Lead Actress in a Miniseries or Special for her role as Candy Morrison in A Killing in a Small Town, which was based on Candy Montgomery's acquittal for the death of Betty Gore. Montgomery had killed Gore on Friday, June 13, 1980, in Gore's Wylie, Texas home, by hitting her 41 times with an ax. The jury determined that she did so in self-defense. In preparation for the part, Hershey had a phone conversation with Montgomery. Many of the names of the real-life principals in the case were changed for the movie. The film's alternative title was Evidence of Love, the name of a 1984 book about the case.

Also in 1990, Hershey drew upon what Woody Allen once described as her "erotic overtones", portraying a woman who falls in love with her much younger nephew by marriage, played by Keanu Reeves, in the comedic Tune in Tomorrow.

In 1991, Hershey played Hanna Trout, the wife of the title character in Paris Trout (1991), a made-for-cable television movie. In this Showtime production, Hershey collaborated again with A Killing in a Small Town director Stephen Gyllenhaal to play a woman who has an affair with her husband's lawyer. Her husband, an abusive bigot (played by Dennis Hopper), is on trial for murdering a young African-American girl. The film, which was based on Pete Dexter's 1988 National Book Award-winning novel, featured Hopper and Hershey enacting a graphic rape scene that the actress found difficult to view. The picture was described as a "dramatic reach deep into the dark hollows of racism, abuse, and murder." Paris Trout was nominated for five Primetime Emmy Awards, including nods for both Hershey and Hopper.

Later in the year, Hershey played an attorney defending her college roommate for the murder of her husband in the suspenseful whodunit Defenseless (1991).

Because of her frequent television appearances, by the end of 1991, Hershey was accused of "selling out to the small screen". In 1992, Hershey appeared with Jane Alexander in the ABC miniseries Stay the Night (1992), prompting Associated Press writer Jerry Buck to write, "Barbara Hershey is a person who jumps back and forth between features and television very easily." She starred in another TV miniseries in 1993, succeeding Anjelica Huston as Clara Allen in the sequel series Return to Lonesome Dove. She was nominated for a Golden Satellite Award for another TV appearance, The Staircase (1998). Between 1999 and 2000, she played Dr. Francesca Alberghetti in six episodes of the medical TV drama Chicago Hope.

Hershey co-starred with Joe Pesci as a nightclub owner in the film drama The Public Eye (1992), and as the estranged wife of a homicidal Michael Douglas in the thriller Falling Down (1993). In 1995, Last of the Dogmen, co-starring Tom Berenger, was released through Savoy Pictures. Among the other feature films in which she appeared during the 1990s was Jane Campion's adaptation of the Henry James novel The Portrait of a Lady (1996). Hershey earned an Academy Award nomination and won the Best Supporting Actress award from the National Society of Film Critics for her role as Madame Serena Merle in that picture. In 1999, Hershey starred in an independent film called Drowning on Dry Land; during production, she met co-star Naveen Andrews, with whom she began a romantic relationship that lasted until 2010.

=== 2000s ===
In 2001, Hershey appeared in the psychological thriller Lantana. She was the only American in a mostly Australian cast, which included Kerry Armstrong, Anthony LaPaglia, and Geoffrey Rush. Film writer Sheila Johnson said the film was "one of the best to emerge from Australia in years." Another thriller followed: 11:14 (2003) also featured Rachael Leigh Cook, Patrick Swayze, Hilary Swank, and Colin Hanks. In 2002, she appeared in a two-scene cameo role as the Contessa in the mini-series Daniel Deronda.

Hershey continued to appear on television during the 2000s, including a season on the series The Mountain. In 2008, she replaced Megan Follows in the role of Anne Shirley in Anne of Green Gables: A New Beginning, the fourth in a series of made-for-TV films based on the character.

=== 2010s ===
Hershey appeared as an American actress, Mrs. Hubbard, in an adaptation of Agatha Christie's Murder on the Orient Express for the British television series Poirot (starring David Suchet), which aired in the United States on Public Broadcast Service in July 2010. Also in 2010, Hershey co-starred in Darren Aronofsky's acclaimed psychological thriller Black Swan (2010) opposite Natalie Portman and Mila Kunis. The following year, she co-starred in the James Wan horror film Insidious (2011). From 2012 to 2013, she had a recurring role in the first two seasons of ABC's hit drama Once Upon a Time as Cora, the Queen of Hearts and mother of the Evil Queen. In 2014, she reprised the role in one episode of the show's spin-off Once Upon a Time in Wonderland. In 2015, she once more reprised the role when she returned to the show for an episode of its fourth season, and in 2016, she appeared again for two episodes of the show's fifth season, most notably its landmark 100th episode.

In A&E's series Damien, Hershey portrayed series regular Ann Rutledge, the world's most powerful woman, who has been given the task to make sure Damien fulfills his destiny as the Antichrist. The role marked another television role for Hershey following Once Upon a Time, The Mountain, Chicago Hope, and Lifetime's Left to Die TV movie.

=== 2020s ===
Hershey's more recent films include The Manor (2021) and 9 Bullets (2022).

== Personal life ==
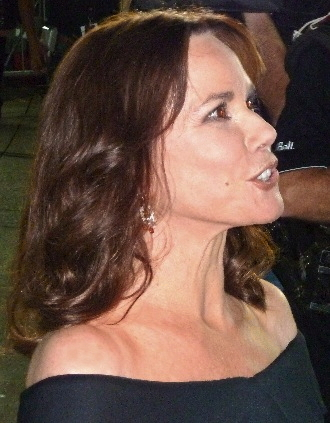
Hershey at the Toronto International Film Festival, September 13, 2010

In 1968, Hershey met David Carradine while they were working on Heaven with a Gun. The pair began a domestic relationship that lasted until 1975. Carradine said that during the rape scene in that movie, he cracked one of Barbara's ribs. They appeared in other films together, including Martin Scorsese's Boxcar Bertha. In 1972, the couple posed together in a nude Playboy spread, recreating some sex scenes from Boxcar Bertha.

On October 6, 1972, Hershey gave birth to their son, Free, who changed his name to Tom when he was nine years old in 1982. The relationship fell apart around the time of Carradine's 1974 burglary arrest, after he had begun an affair with Season Hubley, who had guest-starred in Kung Fu.

During this period, Hershey changed her stage name to "Seagull". In 1979, a blunt newspaper article from the Knight News Service referenced this period of her life, saying of her acting career that "it looked as if she blew it." The article referred to Hershey as a "kook" and stated that she was frequently "high on something". In addition to that criticism, she had been ostracized for breast-feeding her son during an appearance on The Dick Cavett Show, and for breast-feeding him beyond the age of two years.

She said that this period of her life hurt her career: "Producers wouldn't see me because I had a reputation for using drugs and being undependable. I never used drugs at all and I have always been serious about my acting career." After splitting up with Carradine, she changed her stage name back to "Hershey", explaining that she had told the story of why she adopted the name "Seagull" so many times that it had lost its meaning.

By the time Hershey was 42 in 1990, she was described by columnist Luaina Lee as a "private person who was mired in some heavy publicity when she first became a professional actress." Yardena Arar, writing for the Los Angeles Daily News, confirmed that Hershey had become a private person by 1990.

On August 8, 1992, Hershey married artist Stephen Douglas. The ceremony took place at her home in Oxford, Connecticut, where the only guests were their two mothers and Hershey's then 19-year-old son, Tom Carradine. The couple separated and divorced one year after the wedding.

Hershey began dating actor Naveen Andrews in 1999. During a brief separation in 2005, Andrews fathered a child with another woman. In May 2010, after Andrews won sole custody of his son, the couple announced that they had ended their 10-year relationship six months earlier.

== Filmography ==
=== Film ===
Year	Title	Role	Notes
1968	With Six You Get Eggroll	Stacey Iverson	Her film debut
1969	Heaven with a Gun	Leloopa	
1969	Last Summer	Sandy	
1970	The Liberation of L.B. Jones	Nella Mundine	
1970	The Baby Maker	Tish Gray	
1971	The Pursuit of Happiness	Jane Kauffman	
1972	Dealing: Or the Berkeley-to-Boston Forty-Brick Lost-Bag Blues	Susan	
1972	Boxcar Bertha	Boxcar Bertha	
1973	Love Comes Quietly	Angela	
1974	The Crazy World of Julius Vrooder	Zanni	
1975	You and Me	Waitress	
1975	Diamonds	Sally	
1976	The Last Hard Men	Susan Burgade	
1976	Trial by Combat	Marion Evans	
1980	The Stunt Man	Nina Franklin	
1981	Americana	Storekeeper's daughter	
1981	Take This Job and Shove It	J.M. Halstead	
1982	The Entity	Carla Moran	
1983	The Right Stuff	Glennis Yeager	
1984	The Natural	Harriet Bird	
1986	Hannah and Her Sisters	Lee	
1986	Hoosiers	Myra Fleener	
1987	Tin Men	Nora Tilley	
1987	Shy People	Ruth	
1988	A World Apart	Diana Roth	
1988	The Last Temptation of Christ	Mary Magdalene	
1988	Beaches	Hillary Whitney Essex	
1990	Tune in Tomorrow	Aunt Julia	
1991	Paris Trout	Hanna Trout	
1991	Defenseless	Thelma "T.K." Knudsen Katwuller	
1992	The Public Eye	Kay Levitz	
1993	Falling Down	Elizabeth "Beth" Travino	
1993	Swing Kids	Frau Müller	
1993	Splitting Heirs	Duchess Lucinda	
1993	A Dangerous Woman	Frances Beechum	
1995	Last of the Dogmen	Prof. Lillian Diane Sloan	
1996	The Pallbearer	Ruth Abernathy	
1996	The Portrait of a Lady	Madame Serena Merle	
1998	Frogs for Snakes	Eva Santana	
1998	A Soldier's Daughter Never Cries	Marcella Willis	
1999	Breakfast of Champions	Celia Hoover	
1999	Passion	Rose Grainger	
1999	Drowning on Dry Land	Kate	
2001	Lantana	Dr. Valerie Somers	
2003	11:14	Norma	
2004	Riding the Bullet	Jean Parker	
2007	The Bird Can't Fly	Melody	
2007	Love Comes Lately	Rosalie	
2008	Nick Nolte: No Exit	Herself	Documentary film
2008	Uncross the Stars	Hilda	
2008	Childless	Natalie	
2009	Albert Schweitzer	Helene Schweitzer	
2010	Black Swan	Erica Sayers / The Queen	
2010	Insidious	Lorraine Lambert	
2011	Answers to Nothing	Marilyn	
2013	Insidious: Chapter 2	Lorraine Lambert	
2014	Sister	Susan Presser	
2016	The 9th Life of Louis Drax	Violet	
2018	Insidious: The Last Key	Lorraine Lambert	Voice
2021	The Manor	Judith Albright	
2022	9 Bullets	Lacey	
2023	Insidious: The Red Door	Lorraine Lambert	Archival Footage (Uncredited)
2023	Strange Darling	Genevieve	
2026	Insidious: Out of The Further	Lorraine Lambert	Archival Footage (Uncredited)

=== Television films ===
Year	Title	Role
1976	Flood!	Mary Cutler
1977	In the Glitter Palace	Ellen Lange
1977	Just a Little Inconvenience	Nikki Klausing
1977	Sunshine Christmas	Cody Blanks
1979	A Man Called Intrepid	Madelaine
1980	Angel on My Shoulder	Julie
1982	Twilight Theatre	Various
1985	My Wicked, Wicked Ways: The Legend of Errol Flynn	Lili Damita
1986	Passion Flower	Julia Gaitland
1990	A Killing in a Small Town	Candy Morrison
1992	Stay the Night	Jimmie Sue Finger
1993	Abraham	Sarah
1998	The Staircase	Mother Madalyn
2003	Hunger Point	Marsha Hunger
2003	The Stranger Beside Me	Ann Rule
2004	Paradise	Elizabeth Paradise
2008	Anne of Green Gables: A New Beginning	Older Anne Shirley
2012	Left to Die	Sandra Chase

=== Television ===
Year	Title	Role	Notes
1965–1966	Gidget	Ellen / Karen	2 episodes
1966	The Farmer's Daughter	Lucy	2 episodes
1966	Bob Hope Presents the Chrysler Theatre	Casey Holloway	Episode: "Holloway's Daughters"
1966–1967	The Monroes	Kathy Monroe	Main role
1967	Daniel Boone	Dinah Hubbard	Episode: "The King's Shilling"
1968	Run for Your Life	Saro-Jane	Episode: "Saro-Jane, You Never Whispered Again"
1968	The Invaders	Beth Ferguson	Episode: "The Miracle"
1968	The High Chaparral	Moonfire	Episode: "The Peacemaker"
1968	The Princess and Me	Princess	Unsold pilot, never broadcast
1970	Insight	Judy	Episode: "The Whole Damn Human Race and One More"
1973	Love Story	Farrell Edwards	Episode: "The Roller Coaster Stops Here"
1974	Kung Fu	Nan Chi	2 episodes
1980	From Here to Eternity	Karen Holmes	Episode: "Pearl Harbor"
1982	American Playhouse	Lenore	Episode: "Weekend"
1983	Faerie Tale Theatre	The Maid	Episode: "The Nightingale"
1985	Alfred Hitchcock Presents	Jessie Dean	Episode: "Wake Me When I'm Dead"
1988	Mickey's 60th Birthday	Herself	TV Special
1993	Return to Lonesome Dove	Clara Allen	3 episodes
1999–2000	Chicago Hope	Dr. Francesca Alberghetti	Main role
2002	Daniel Deronda	Contessa Maria Alcharisi	Episode: "1.3"
2004–2005	The Mountain	Gennie Carver	Main role
2010	Agatha Christie's Poirot	Caroline Hubbard	Episode: "Murder on the Orient Express"
2012–2016	Once Upon a Time	Cora Mills / Queen of Hearts	Recurring role (season 2), guest (season 1, 4, 5) (15 episodes)
2014	Once Upon a Time in Wonderland	Cora Mills / Queen of Hearts	Episode: "Heart of the Matter"
2016	Damien	Ann Rutledge	Main role
2018	The X-Files	Erika Price	3 episodes
2020	Paradise Lost	Byrd Forsythe	Main role
2023	Beacon 23	Sophie	2 episodes
