= Glory Alley =

1952 American film by Raoul Walsh

- Directed by: Raoul Walsh
- Written by: Art Cohn
- Produced by: Nicholas Nayfack
- Starring: Ralph Meeker; Leslie Caron; Kurt Kasznar; Gilbert Roland
- Narrated by: John McIntire
- Cinematography: William H. Daniels
- Edited by: Gene Ruggiero
- Music by: Pete Rugolo; Albert Sendrey; George Stoll
- Distributed by: Metro-Goldwyn-Mayer
- Release date: June 6, 1952
- Running time: 79 minutes
- Country: United States
- Language: English
- Budget: $971,000
- Box office: $607,000

Glory Alley is a 1952 American musical drama film directed by Raoul Walsh and starring Ralph Meeker, Leslie Caron and Gilbert Roland.

== Plot ==
New Orleans newspaper columnist Gabe Jordan, nearing retirement, tells the story of boxer Socks Barbarossa.

One night, just before a championship bout, Socks abruptly flees the ring and runs to the locker room. He angrily announces to his manager Peppi Donato and his girlfriend's blind father Gus "Judge" Evans that he will not fight again, but he refuses to provide a reason. When Socks' opponent later confronts him in the empty arena, Socks knocks him unconscious.

Socks visits his girlfriend Angie Evans, a dancer and singer, at the nightclub where she works. She is upset about the manner in which Socks quit the ring and wonders what has happened to him. He tries to explain to the Judge, who expresses his disappointment and anger, calling Socks a weak quitter.

Socks turns to a life of heavy drinking and is soon destitute. Peppi saves him, giving Socks a job as a bartender in his nightclub. Socks is drafted and sees brutal combat in the Korean War. He is awarded the Medal of Honor after risking his life in battle and returns to New Orleans as a hero, but the Judge remains upset with him. Socks proposes marriage to Angie, but she is hesitant because she needs to care for her blind father. After a tour to sell war bonds, Socks becomes embittered upon returning to normal life, mistreating Angie and nearly returning his medal to the president.

Dr. Robert Ardley approaches the Judge about an operation to restore his eyesight, but the Judge learns that Socks arranged it, hoping to marry Angie. The Judge is furious and proclaims that he would rather remain blind, but Angie accuses him of fearing the operation because he might lose her as well as the sympathy that he receives. He agrees to undergo the operation.

Ardley describes to the Judge how Socks was the son of a deadbeat criminal who inflicted severe physical abuse on him as a child that left him with a serious head injury. Socks tells Angie of how he endured teasing because of his scars and thought that he had heard similar remarks before the championship bout, which was the reason why he had run from the ring.

The operation fails to restore the Judge's eyesight, but he declares that it was a success because his heart has been opened.

Socks returns to the ring as an even better boxer, soon becoming the champion.

== Cast ==
- Ralph Meeker as Socks Barbarossa
- Leslie Caron as Angela Evans
- Kurt Kasznar as Gus "Judge" Evans
- Gilbert Roland as Peppi Donnato
- John McIntire as Gabe Jordan / Narrator
- Louis Armstrong as Shadow Johnson
- Jack Teagarden as Musician
- Dan Seymour as Sal Nichols (The Pig)
- Larry Gates as Dr. Robert Ardley
- Pat Goldin as Jabber
- John Indrisano as Spider
- Mickey Little as Domingo
- Dick Simmons as Dan
- Pat Valentino as Terry Waulker
- David McMahon as Frank

== Reception ==
In a contemporary review for The New York Times, critic Bosley Crowther called the film "a fatuous little fable" and wrote: "'That cute little French girl, Leslie Caron, who brought such charm and grace to Metro's 'An American in Paris,' is wasted miserably in that same studio's 'Glory Alley' ... And, to be truthful about it, a lot more is wasted here, too—including the time of those people who go to see this film. ... Miss Caron is stuck with the assignment of playing this fellow's loyal girl, which is about as pathetic an assignment as we have seen anyone try to handle this year."

The Chicago Tribune reviewer wrote: "Here's a waste of talent, if I ever saw it. ... [The cast] all struggle helplessly with a strained and idiotic script which goes absolutely nowhere. ... The story winds up with a preposterous climax, which proves that the young pugilist's troubles stem from a childhood scar. I think the script writer must have one, too."

According to MGM records, the film earned $426,000 in the U.S. and Canada and $181,000 overseas, resulting in a loss of $621,000.

== Comic-book adaptation ==
- Eastern Color Movie Love #17 (October 1952)

== See also ==
- List of boxing films
