= Shadow in the Sky =

1952 film by Fred M. Wilcox

- Directed by: Fred M. Wilcox
- Screenplay by: Ben Maddow
- Based on: Come Again Another Day; 1950 story in The New Yorker by Edward Newhouse
- Produced by: William H. Wright
- Starring: Ralph Meeker; Nancy Davis; James Whitmore; Jean Hagen
- Cinematography: George J. Folsey, A.S.C.
- Edited by: Ben Lewis
- Music by: Bronislau Kaper
- Production company: Metro-Goldwyn-Mayer
- Distributed by: Metro-Goldwyn-Mayer
- Release date: February 15, 1952
- Running time: 78 minutes
- Country: United States
- Language: English
- Budget: $787,000
- Box office: $320,000

Shadow in the Sky is a 1952 American drama film directed by Fred M. Wilcox and starring Ralph Meeker, Nancy Davis, James Whitmore and Jean Hagen. It was produced and distributed by Metro-Goldwyn-Mayer. Writer Ben Maddow called it "very bad".

== Plot ==
Lou and Betty Hopke, who own a gas station in California, feel that they owe help to Burt, an ex-Marine who has been confined to a veteran's hospital since the war. Lou is indebted for Burt's having saved his life in combat, and Burt is also Betty's brother.

Whenever it rains, Burt is stricken with terrible memories and panic attacks. Although they want to let Burt live in their home, Lou and Betty worry about his volatile behavior around their two young children.

Stella Murphy has met Burt at a hospital dance and urges him to find a home of his own. She wants him to move to Oregon with her and work on her grandfather's farm, but that region's rainy climate discourages him. Burt decides to invest in the Hopkes' gas station, causing an angry Stella to leave him.

Burt uses his savings to buy a small boat, which he fixes up. Lou and Betty's young son Chris keeps pleading with Burt to take him sailing. The boy stows away when Burt launches the boat, but Burt sends him safely home. Later, the boy sneaks out of his bedroom at the family's home and returns to Burt's boat, docked at a marina. It is dark and it is raining, and Burt is asleep inside the small boat, traumatized by the rain. The boy falls overboard, but his cries of help remind Burt of how he saved Lou's life in another torrential downpour. He rescues the boy, after which everyone is assured that Burt is going to be all right.

== Cast ==
- Ralph Meeker as Burt
- Nancy Davis as Betty
- James Whitmore as Lou
- Jean Hagen as Stella
- Gladys Hurlbut as Mrs. Lehner
- Eduard Franz as The Doctor
- Dennis Ross as Chris
- Nadene Ashdown as Nina
- John Lupton as Clayton
- Jonathan Cott as Doug

Uncredited (in order of appearance)
Edward Clark	Larkin, old patient at veterans' hospital who says, "Mmm... that's what I call cookies"
Jack Kruschen	veterans' hospital intern who approaches when Lou witnesses Burt's panic attack caused by falling rain
Ben Hall	one of the men dancing near Burt and Stella at the veterans' hospital dance
Chet Brandenburg	one of the men dancing near Burt and Stella at the veterans' hospital dance
Emile Meyer	bartender at waterfront bar who tells Lou that Burt's boat is at pier twenty-one

== Reception ==
The film was a major financial disaster despite its low cost. According to MGM records it earned $244,000 in the US and Canada and $76,000 elsewhere, making a loss to the studio of $644,000.
