= Dillinger (1960 film) =

- Screenplay by: David Davidson
- Directed by: Mel Ferber
- Starring: Ralph Meeker
- Country of origin: United States
- Original language: English

Production
- Producer: John Houseman

Original release
- Network: CBS
- Release: 1960

Dillinger is a 1960 American TV film starring Ralph Meeker as John Dillinger. It was produced by John Houseman.

It was meant to be the pilot for a new TV series The Lawbreakers.

== Cast ==
- Philip Abbott as Harry Pierpont
- Steven Hill as Melvin Purvis
- Ralph Meeker as John Dillinger
- Jane Rose as Anna Sage
