= Help! The Doctor Is Drowning =

1974 film

- Directed by: Nikolai van der Heyde
- Written by: Toon Kortooms; Felix Thijssen
- Produced by: Henk Bos; Jan Dorresteyn
- Starring: Jules Croiset
- Cinematography: Jörgen Persson
- Music by: Tata Mirando; Rogier van Otterloo
- Release date: 28 February 1974
- Running time: 94 minutes
- Country: Netherlands
- Language: Dutch
- Box office: 1,088,000 admissions (Netherlands)

Help! The Doctor Is Drowning (Dutch: Help, de dokter verzuipt!) is a 1974 Dutch comedy film directed by Nikolai van der Heyde. It was the most popular Dutch film of the year and one of the most popular of all time. It was selected as the Dutch entry for the Best Foreign Language Film at the 47th Academy Awards, but was not accepted as a nominee.

== Cast ==
- Jules Croiset as Dokter Angelino
- Martine Bijl as Irene Muller
- Piet Bambergen as Aannemer Bram Van Tienen
- Willeke van Ammelrooy as Katja
- Ward de Ravet as Meneer Pastoor
- Leen Jongewaard as Veldwachter Van Bree
- Fanny Winkler as Ella
- Romain DeConinck as Herman de Rechtvaardige
- Frans Mulder as Kareltje
- Geert Thijssens as Everhard van Dungen
- Betsy Smeets as Barones
- Onno Molenkamp as Baron
- Henk O'Breen as Professor

== Release ==
The film was the most successful Dutch film of the year with 1,088,000 admissions in the Netherlands.

It was entered into the 1975 Melbourne International Film Festival. It was also selected as the Dutch entry for the Best Foreign Language Film at the 47th Academy Awards, but was not accepted as a nominee.

== See also ==
- List of submissions to the 47th Academy Awards for Best Foreign Language Film
- List of Dutch submissions for the Academy Award for Best Foreign Language Film
