= Universal Soldier (1971 film) =

1971 film by Cy Endfield

- VHS cover
- Directed by: Cy Endfield
- Screenplay by: Cy Endfield; Additional dialogue: Kevin Duggan; Kenneth Fueurman; George Lazenby
- Story by: Joseph Massot; Derek Marlowe
- Produced by: Frederick Schwartz; Donald Factor
- Starring: George Lazenby; Ben Carruthers; Robin Hunter; Edward Judd; Alan Barnes; Cy Endfield; Germaine Greer; Rudolph Walker
- Cinematography: Tony Imi
- Edited by: Rex Pyke
- Music by: Phillip Goodhand-Tait
- Production companies: Appaloosa Pictures; Ionian Finance
- Distributed by: Hemdale Film Corporation
- Release dates: 11 June 1971 May 1972 (London) July 1972 (Dublin) 1974 (Australia)
- Running time: 94 minutes
- Country: United Kingdom
- Language: English
- Budget: £300,000

Universal Soldier is a 1971 film directed by Cy Endfield and starring George Lazenby. It was the final film of Endfield, who also has an acting role in it. The title came from the 1964 song of the same name by Buffy Sainte-Marie.

== Plot ==
Ryker, a former mercenary, comes out of retirement to take part in the overthrow of an African dictator. He travels to London to meet former war comrade Jesse Jones, and his associates Freddy Bradshaw and Temple Smith. After helping fellow mercenaries test and ship weapons to South Africa, Ryker begins to have ethical concerns about his involvement. He eventually distances himself from the others, and rents a flat in London. He falls into hippie culture, and begins dating a girl named Chrissie.

Jesse tracks down Ryker. Explaining that the operation is not producing the profits he expected, he tries to convince Ryker to return. Ryker declines, but develops a plan with Jesse to thwart the operation and take the money for themselves. They succeed and escape with Bradshaw's car. A weapons dealer named Rawlings pursues them.

Jesse discovers that their "take" is somewhat less than the amount of cash they supposedly embezzled. Ryker reveals that his real plan was to sabotage the gun running operation, not to take all the money. Jesse assaults Ryker; Ryker, now a pacifist, refuses to defend himself. Ryker is eventually forced to break Jesse's ankle to end his assault. As Ryker bundles Jesse into a car to seek medical treatment, Rawlings shoots them down with rifle fire.

== Cast ==
- George Lazenby as Ryker
- Ben Carruthers as Jesse
- Robin Hunter as Bradshaw
- Rudolph Walker as Mbote
- Cy Endfield as Derek Bowden
- Alan Barnes as Temple Smith
- Guy Deghy as Timmerman
- Edward Judd as Rawlings
- Germaine Greer as Clara Bowden
- Ronan O'Rahilly as Gered
- Kevin Duggan as hippie

== Production ==
=== Development ===
The film was based on an original idea by Cy Endfield and some associates in the 1960s. It was originally envisioned as a straight action-adventure movie about a mercenary who buys arms in London. Endfield became distracted on other projects until he re-connected with George Lazenby.

Lazenby had just achieved international fame playing James Bond in On Her Majesty's Secret Service but decided not to repeat the role. He spent over a year deciding what film to make next when he ran into Endfield. The two men had worked with each other previously - it was Endfield who had directed Lazenby in the advertisement for Big Fry chocolate that helped the actor be cast as James Bond. Lazenby:

I told him I wanted to make the kind of film I could believe in. He came back two days later with a conventional script about gun-runners – just a joke to both of us. But with his 28 years' experience in the business he knew we had to have that kind of script to raise the backing.

Lazenby and Endfield took the project to Frederick Schwartz of Appaloosa Productions, who raised the finance. His co producer was Donald Factor, of the Factor family, who had left the family business six years earlier to work in filmmaking; his credits included That Cold Day in the Park. Half the budget of £300,000 was raised from a bank with the rest coming from the cast and crew agreeing to deferred payment. It was extremely rare for British crews to agree to deferred payment but unemployment was high in the British film industry at the time. Lazenby did not take a fee for his performance; indeed, he invested his own money to make the movie happen. There was a pre-sale guarantee from Albert Caraco's distribution consortium; Caraco had the rights to sell the film globally, except for Britain and the US where the producers held the rights.

The movie was announced in November 1970. Lazenby described the movie at the time as "anti-guns and anti-Bond... a [comedy] with no plot. It is really just a series of happenings which keep the audience entertained. This is the kind of film which is coming out in Europe now." He later elaborated:

I believe that there is a true revolution going on in the youth of today which is far more than just a fad or a passing fashion. The kids are beginning to learn that the world's economy is dependent on the arms race, and they don't like it. They feel the people going on and on making guns could be building new irrigation schemes to make the deserts productive, or making agricultural equipment to help feed all the hungry. People would be far happier employed this way than they are in wars and they would be saving lives instead of taking them. If anyone told me today there was an advancing army just outside Botany Bay, I wouldn't want to pick up a gun and fire away at it. I'd be keener to swim out and have a discussion about it.

Lazenby said the film was "the story of what's happened to me. A lot of my friends are into yoga and I went to India to find out what it's all about" saying they taught him "There's another way if you don't like this one", and that the intuitive self should take over from the conditioned self. "You don't have to be anybody", he said, "If the President of the US invites you to dinner tomorrow night it shouldn't mean anything special because you are a god unto yourself." Lazenby added that "If anyone had told me about yogis six years ago I'd probably have chopped him in the mouth."

Donald Factor said "This is a whole lot more than just another piece of empty pacifism, another tilt at the establishment. Universal Soldier attempts to present a view of the alternative. It’s a positive statement rather than a destructive one."

=== Filming ===
Filming took place in London in November and December 1970. Some scenes were shot in Finch's, a pub in Portobello Road which had been popular with real mercenaries. The British Army refused to loan their barracks for a scene involving a peace demonstration. The scene in an arms factory was shot in a factory near London.

Lazenby said the film was made with an improvisational style:

We wrote it as we went along, watching just what each member of the cast could best do, and adapting accordingly. We tell the actors the idea of a scene, but let them speak it in their own words. There are no elocution experts around our outfit and no one talks in that foreign Hollywood language, which has nothing to do with how people speak in the street. This way the characters don't sound like actors. It will be a strange experience, seeing my film, but I hope it will be entertaining as well as having something to say. Perhaps there will be many young people who will say we haven't gone far enough out of the old technique. Well, if I could put on the screen what is in my head, I would never get it down at all.

"We did it as we went along", Lazenby said later."There was a script but we didn’t follow it – we were all smoking wacky tobacco."

Germaine Greer appeared as Clara Bowden, wife of Derek Bowden, played by the film's director Cy Endfield. "She is a most interesting person with a lot of fresh ideas", said Lazenby. "Working with people like her is a far greater experience than working with run- of-the-mill actors who think of nothing but their own careers."

Lazenby's girlfriend in the film was played by his real-life girlfriend at the time. The two of them later married.

After finishing the main shoot, Lazenby returned to Australia for a brief visit where he told a reporter:

No one yet knows exactly how the film will end. When I get back from Australia we shall edit, fit the music, and have every – thing but the last shot in the can. Then about three days before the film is shown, we want to stage a real demonstration in the street, mingle the actors with it, Cy will shoot it, and this will be the final scene in the film. By doing it this way, it will be absolutely up to date. It must be current if it is to have the impact we want. Then the audience will really be involved with present history.

Lazenby was optimistic he could use this method for other movies:

The nine months I spent on the Bond film I learnt about the old-fashioned way of doing things-and a lot about what not to do. Now I'm trying to learn the newer, freer approach working with Cy Endfield. I feel once I've learnt from him something about putting a movie together I shall be able to go on and develop some of my own ideas. I'm lucky now, because I know enough of the tricks of the trade to feel I shall never have to starve and this gives me a chance to work on my ideals.

Lazenby said Endfield wanted to end the film with Lazenby's character being killed and the actor disagreed. "I didn’t want him to die because he’d done the right thing. So I refused to film it. They had to freeze frame it instead."

Lazenby claimed that Jimi Hendrix was supposed to do the music for the movie. "Then he died", he said.

Lazenby later admitted he "didn't know what he was doing" when making the film and that the investors had to take over before shooting finished. He and three other men associated with the film were each sued for £10,000 by Ionian Finance, who had lent money for the movie.

== Reception ==
=== Box office ===
The film saw some success after positive critical reception.

"I had a piece of the action and I never got a cent", says Lazenby. "I’ve only ever seen it once."

=== Critical ===
Dilys Powell of the Sunday Times reviewed the movie and said "I am glad to recommend... this story... a notable performance in the lead role by George Lazenby, relaxed, reflective but solidly resolved, very different from that misfire a year or two ago as James Bond." Judith Crist of New York found the actor to be a strong point of the earlier movie, which was no failure at the box office (budget: $8 million, worldwide box office: $82 million), stating that "This time around there's less suavity and a no-nonsense muscularity and maleness to the role via the handsome Mr. Lazenby".

Lazenby has since called the film "silly".

"On Universal Soldier I was involved in the production, the writing and even a bit in direction", he said in 1973. "I don't think I'm a good enough actor to get fragmented like that on a job. Now I can give my full concentration to acting I hope it will be good and lead to other roles."
