= Marjolein Beumer =

Dutch actress (born 1966)

- Born: Marjolein Janssen; 27 October 1966 (age 59); Amstelveen, Netherlands
- Occupation: Actress
- Years active: 1992–present
- Spouse: Rik Launspach
- Children: 2

Marjolein Beumer (born Janssen; 27 October 1966, Amstelveen, North Holland) is a Dutch actress. She is the sister of actress Famke Janssen and director Antoinette Beumer. She is married to fellow performer Rik Launspach.

== Filmography ==
=== Actor ===
- Survival (1992) (TV) Jessica
- De Vlinder Tilt de kat op (1994) Linda
- JuJu (1996) Katrien
- Unit 13 Elly (2 episodes, 1996)
- Baantjer Helen de Winter / Marjolein Tazelaar (2 episodes, 1997/1999)
- Zebra (1998) TV Series Liesbeth
- De Geheime dienst (2000) TV Series Wilma van Hall
- De 9 dagen van de gier (2001) TV Series Ellen Vermeer
- Trauma 24/7 (2002) TV Series Astrid van der Linden, Hoofd SEH
- Long Distance (2003/I) Moeder
- Wet & Waan Mieke (1 episode, 2004)
- De Kroon (2004) (mini) TV Series Interpreter
- Bezet (2004)
- Grijpstra & de Gier Kristel Rilke (1 episode, 2005)
- Moes ROC teacher (2008 Dutch TV Series)
- De storm Minister (2009)
- Soof Arts (2013)
- Flikken Maastricht Angelique Meertens (5 episodes, 2014)

=== Writer ===
- Sophie (2015)
- Rendez-Vous (2015)
- Soof (2013)
- De Storm (2009)
- Moes (2008)
- Bezet (2004)
