= Jules Croiset =

Dutch actor (born 1937)

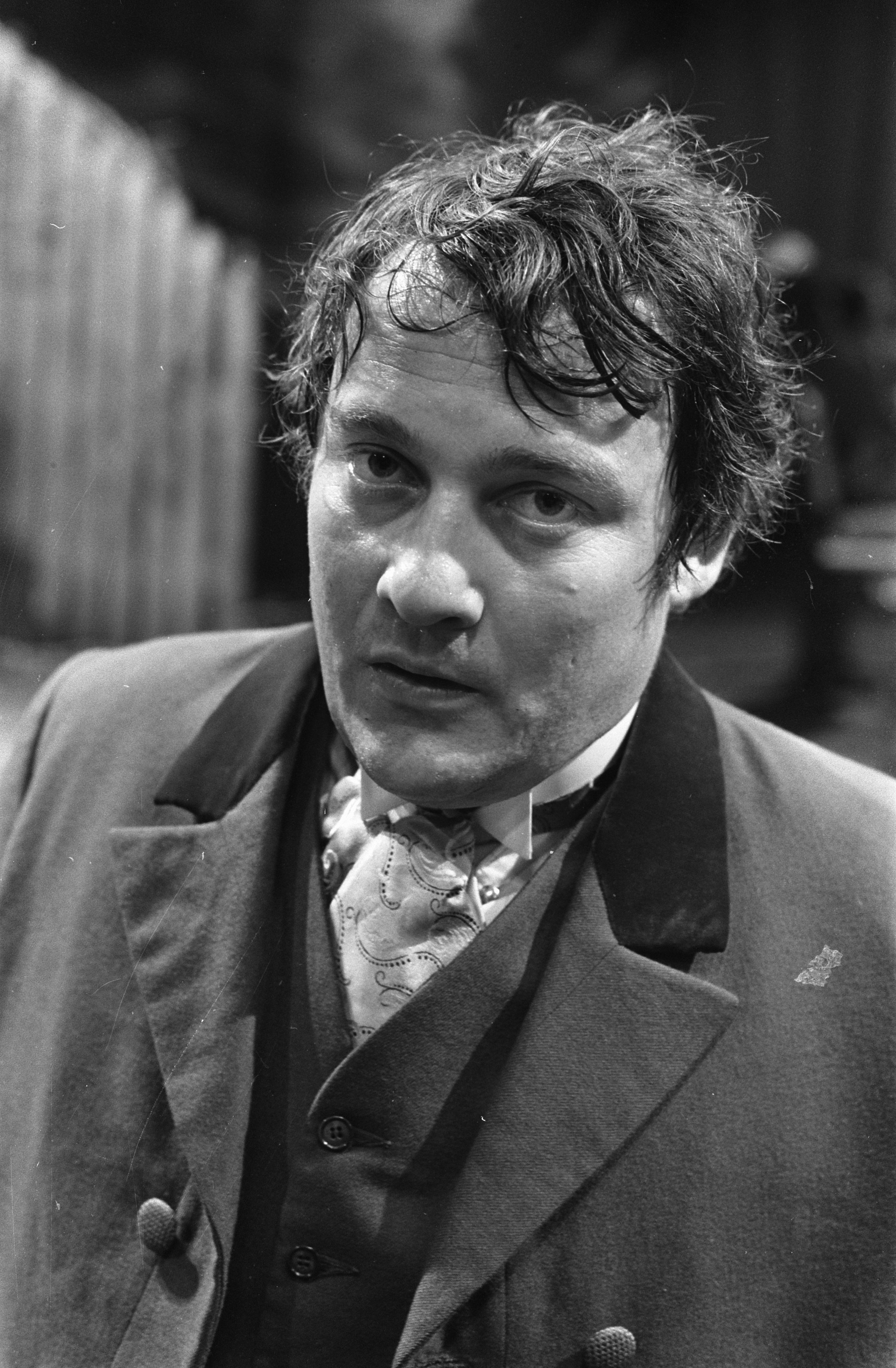
- Croiset in 1970
- Born: Julien Gustave Croiset; 9 October 1937 (age 88); Deventer, Overijssel, Netherlands
- Occupation: Actor
- Years active: 1960-present

Jules Croiset (born 9 October 1937) is a Dutch actor. He has appeared in more than 40 films and television shows since 1960. He is also known for having staged his own abduction by neo-Nazis in 1987.

== Selected filmography ==
- Help! The Doctor Is Drowning (1974)
- Doctor Snuggles (1980) (voice)
- De Witte Waan (1984)
- Amsterdamned (1988)
- Intensive Care (1991)
- The Butterfly Lifts the Cat Up (1994)
- Nachtvlinder (1999)
- Michiel de Ruyter (2015)
