= Intensive Care (1991 film) =

- Poster for the Dutch-language version
- Directed by: Dorna van Rouveroy
- Written by: Ruud Den Dryver (writer), Hans Heijnen (screenplay)
- Starring: George Kennedy; Koen Wauters; Nada van Nie; Michiel Hess
- Cinematography: Jan van den Nieuwenhuijzen
- Edited by: Sharon V.L. Brown; Ton Ruys
- Music by: Paul Natte
- Distributed by: CNR Film Releasing
- Release date: 1 November 1991
- Running time: 91 minutes
- Country: Netherlands
- Language: Dutch

Intensive Care is a 1991 Dutch horror film directed by Dorna van Rouveroy and starring George Kennedy, Koen Wauters and Nada van Nie. The film was produced in two separate versions: the original English-language version and a Dutch-language version.

== Plot ==
The famous surgeon Dr. Bruckner suffers a car accident, which leaves him horribly burned and puts him into a coma for seven years. When he awakes at New Years' Night he starts a murdering rampage. As the plot progresses he stalks a girl named Amy, her boyfriend Peter and Amy's brother Bobby and tries to enter their house, while the friends try to fence him off.

== Cast ==
- George Kennedy as Dr. Bruckner
- Koen Wauters as Peter
- Nada van Nie as Amy
- Michiel Hess as Bobby
- Dick van den Toorn as Ted
- Jules Croiset as Dr. Horvath
- Huub Scholten as Inspector Eddy
- Nora Tilley as Rose
- Arthur Boni as Steven
- Dolf de Vries as Hank
- Barbara Barendrecht as Shirley
- Fred Florusse as John
- Simone Dresens as Christine
- Fred Van Kuyk as Inspector Fox
- Luc Theeboom as Bert

== Reception ==
The Dutch magazine Schokkend Nieuws described the film as pioneering work, while noting that the Dutch-language version provoked negative reactions in the Dutch press. In Veronica Magazine, Lodewijk Rijff wrote that the film developed into "an exciting thriller of American allure". The film was sold to distributors in 46 countries and the Dutch-language version later became one of the most rented Dutch films on home video in the Netherlands and Belgium. In 2001, De Volkskrant journalist Jan Pieter Ekker wrote that the Dutch theatrical version of the film was being given “a second chance” at the cult film event Nacht van de Wansmaak, comparing this to the renewed attention for Paul Verhoeven’s film Showgirls. The Dutch-language version over the years gained a cult following despite an initially negative reception in parts of the Dutch press.At the end of the opening sequence, surgeon Dr. Bruckner is severely injured in a car accident and falls into a coma. When he later awakens, he embarks on a series of attacks. In the Dutch-language version Amy remarks to her injured boyfriend, “Moet ik een pleister voor je halen? Jeetje mina!” ("Should I get you a band-aid? Good grief!"). The original English-language version contains different dialogue. Screenwriter Heijnen stated in Schokkend Nieuws that the humorous elements in the film were intentional in his original screenplay and were not always well received. A compilation of scenes from the film was shown during some editions of the Dutch-Belgian cult film event Nacht van de Wansmaak.The film received the “Mondo Bizarro Award” at the 2001 International Film Festival Rotterdam.

== See also ==
- List of films considered the worst
