= Fearless Frank =

1967 film by Philip Kaufman

- Directed by: Philip Kaufman
- Written by: Philip Kaufman
- Produced by: Philip Kaufman
- Starring: Jon Voight; Monique van Vooren; Severn Darden; Lois Darling; Lou Gilbert
- Cinematography: Bill Butler
- Edited by: Luke Bennett; Aram Boyajian
- Music by: Meyer Kupferman
- Production company: Jericho Productions
- Distributed by: Trans American Films
- Release date: April 29, 1967 (Cannes)
- Running time: 83 minutes
- Country: United States
- Language: English

Fearless Frank is a 1967 American fantasy comedy film written and directed by Philip Kaufman. It is notable as the film debut of Jon Voight. Voight plays a murdered drifter who gets reanimated and turned into a superhero by a scientist (Severn Darden). Other notable cast members include Nelson Algren as a mobster named Needles, and Ken Nordine as the narrator, credited as "The Stranger."

== Plot ==
Frank is an unsophisticated country boy who journeys to Chicago to find his fortune. Upon arrival he crosses the path of Plethora, who is on the run from a gangster known only as The Boss. The Boss's henchmen arrive, take Plethora and shoot Frank dead.

His body is discovered by The Good Doctor and his servant Alfred. Claude uses his invention to create what he believes will be a "brave new man", resurrecting Frank. Claude trains Frank to become an educated and benevolent citizen, before revealing to his pupil that the latter has supernatural powers. Frank then begins his career as a crime-fighter, having many adventures and misadventures along the way.

== Cast ==
- Monique van Vooren as Plethora
- Jon Voight as Fearless Frank
- Joan Darling as Lois
- Severn Darden as The Good Doctor / Claude, the mad scientist
- Anthony Holland as Alfred
- Lou Gilbert as The Boss
- Benito Carruthers as The Cat
- David Steinberg as The Rat
- David Fisher as Screwnose
- Nelson Algren as Needles

== Production ==
Philip Kaufman saw Jon Voight in an off-Broadway adaption of A View from a Bridge. Kaufman soon cast Voight in the film, which was shot circa 1965.

== See also ==
- List of American films of 1967
