= You'll Never See Me Again =

1973 American television film

You'll Never See Me Again is a 1973 American TV film directed by Jeannot Szwarc, aired on February 28, 1973 as part of the anthology series ABC Movie of the Week.

== Plot ==
A woman storms out after a quarrel and her husband desperately searches for her while the police suspect him of killing her. Based on a story by Cornell Woolrich.

== Cast ==
- David Hartman as Ned Bliss
- Jane Wyatt as Mary Alden
- Ralph Meeker as Will Alden
- Jess Walton as Vicki Bliss
- Joseph Campanella as Lt. John Stillman
- George Murdock as Desk Sergeant
- Frank Parker as Ticket Seller
- Ned Wertimer as Motel Clerk
- Bo Svenson as Sam
- Bill Zuckert as Charley
