= Martine Bijl =

Dutch singer, actress, and writer (1948–2019)

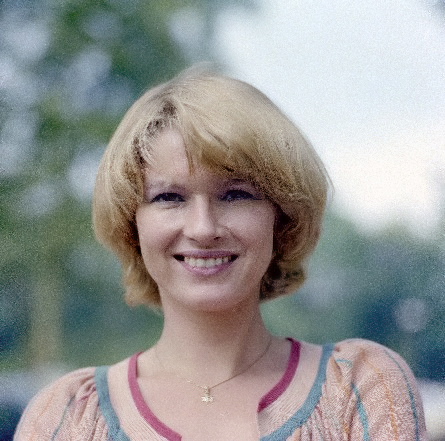
- Martine Bijl in 1978
- Born: Martine Catharina Maria Bijl; 19 March 1948; Amsterdam, Netherlands
- Died: 30 May 2019 (aged 71); Maarssen, Netherlands
- Occupations: Singer, actress, writer, television presenter
- Years active: 1965–2019
- Spouse: Berend Boudewijn (m. 1992)

Martine Catharina Maria Bijl (19 March 1948 – 30 May 2019) was a Dutch singer, actress, television presenter, and writer. She achieved national prominence from the 1960s onward through her work in music, theatre, television, and books.

== Early life ==
Bijl was born in Amsterdam in 1948 as the daughter of a general practitioner. She attended secondary school at the Spinoza Lyceum and subsequently followed a preparatory course at a conservatory. As a teenager Bijl performed self-accompanied songs on guitar and was discovered at the age of seventeen by chanson expert Ben Levi. In 1966 she released her debut album Martine Bijl zingt, which marked her breakthrough. This was aided by radio and television appearances facilitated by presenter Willem Duys. That same year she represented the Netherlands at the Knokke Song Contest, where the Dutch team won.

== Career ==
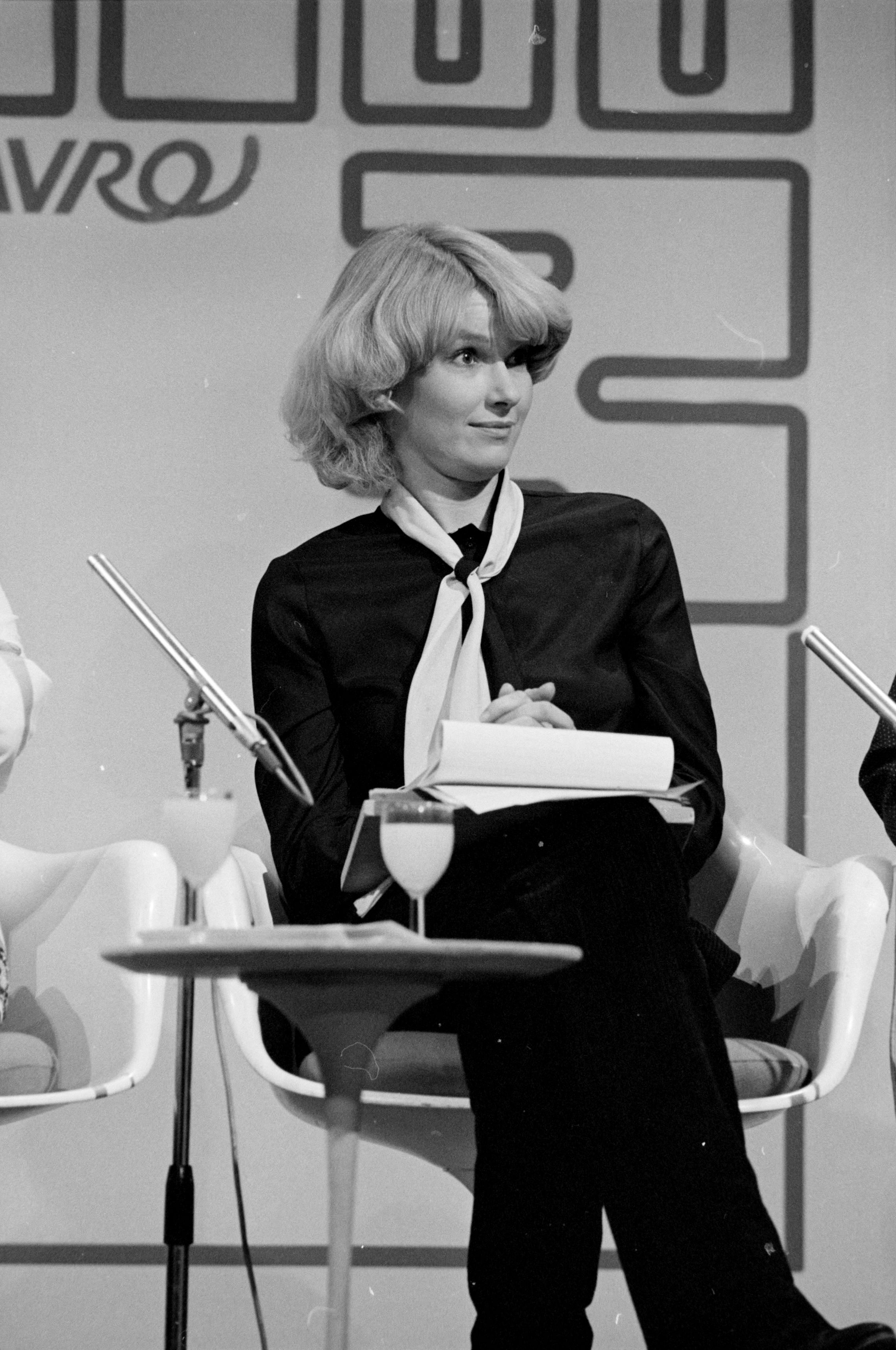
Martine Bijl as panelist on Wie van de drie?

After winning an Edison Award in 1968, she became a frequent television presence. From the 1970s onward Bijl increasingly focused on acting, appearing in films such as Help! The Doctor Is Drowning (1974) and later Family Way (2012). She gained wide popularity as a panelist on the game show Wie van de drie? and starred in television series including Het zonnetje in huis, the Dutch version of Tom, Dick and Harriet, and Kees & Co, the Dutch version of 2point4 Children.

In 1975 she launched her own television show Martine, followed by further programmes and theatre performances. Between 1983 and 1990 Bijl created several successful one-woman theatre shows, for which she received critical acclaim. She was also known for her long-running appearances in commercials for the Dutch food company HAK. From the 1990s onward she increasingly devoted herself to writing and translation, working on sitcoms, stage productions, and Dutch adaptations of musicals such as The Lion King and Billy Elliot.

In 2013 Bijl made a television comeback as presenter of Heel Holland Bakt, the Dutch version of British television baking competition The Great British Bake Off. The programme introduced her to a new generation of viewers.

== Personal life ==
In her early career, Bijl met guitarist and composer Henk van der Molen, with whom she had a long-term relationship that lasted until 1990. In 1992, she married actor Berend Boudewijn. She did not have children with either of them.

== Later life and death ==
In 2015 Bijl suffered a severe brain haemorrhage, followed by long-term health complications and periods of depression. She documented her experiences in the book Rinkeldekink, published in 2018, which was well received by critics and readers. Martine Bijl died on 30 May 2019 in Maarssen at the age of 71 due to complications related to the brain haemorrhage.

== Television (selection) ==
- Wie van de drie? (1971–1983, panelist).
- Martine (1975–1979, her own television series).
- Nationaal Songfestival (1979, presenter).
- Dinges (1986–1988, presenter).
- Eurovision Young Musicians 1988 (1988, presenter).
- Het zonnetje in huis (1993–2003)
- Kees & Co (1997-2006, screen writer/translator)
- Wie van de drie? (2010–2013, panelist).
- Krasse Knarren (2012–2014, presenter).
- Heel Holland Bakt (2013–2015, presenter).

== Filmography (selection) ==
- Ram-Jam (1966, television film)
- Luister naar dit leven (1967, television film)
- Help, de dokter verzuipt! (1974, film)
- Vroeger kon je lachen (1983, film)
- Alles is familie (2012, film)

== Theatre ==
=== Theatre shows ===
- Martine (1983–1985)
- De Martine Bijl Show (1985–1986)
- Martine Bijl (1987–1988)
- Mevrouw Bijl (1989–1990)

=== Musicals (selection) ===
- Aida (2002, translator)
- The Lion King (2004, translator)
- Tarzan (2007, translator)
- Mary Poppins (2010, translator)
- La Cage Aux Folles (2011, translator)
- Billy Elliot (2015, translator)

== Discography (selection) ==
Martine Bijl recorded numerous gramophone records, including singles, full-length albums, and appearances on compilation albums. Notable releases include:

- ’t Bloemendaalse bos (1966)
- 12 Nieuwe Luisterliedjes (1967)
- Benjamin (1972)
- Martine Bijl Zingt Andersen (1975)
- Het lelijke jonge eendje (1976)
- Limburgs klaaglied (1977)
- Tovenaarsleerling (1982)
- Vanmorgen vloog ze nog (1988)
- Kinderen van Toen (2002)
- Hollands Glorie (2008)

== Bibliography (selection) ==
- Elfje twaalfje. Unieboek, 1969.
- Sprookjes van de Efteling, with Anton Pieck. Uitgeverij Kok, 1972.
- Martines tekstboek, with Henk van der Molen. Omniboek, 1981.
- Poppen. Pictures Publishers, 1995.
- Hindergroen. Atlas Contact, 2016.
- Rinkeldekink. Atlas Contact, 2018.

== Awards and honours ==
- Edison Award (1968)
- Louis Davids Prize (1976)
- Gouden Televizier-Ring (1980)
- Johan Kaart Prize (1983)
- Scheveningen Cabaret Prize (1984)
- Gouden Beeld (Dutch Academy Award) (1998)
- John Kraaijkamp Musical Award (2002, 2007, 2015)
