= The Storm (2009 film) =

- Theatrical release poster
- Directed by: Ben Sombogaart
- Written by: Marjolein Beumer; Rik Launspach
- Produced by: Johan Nijenhuis; Alan de Levitta
- Starring: Sylvia Hoeks; Barry Atsma; Dirk Roofthooft; Monic Hendrickx; Katja Herbers; Lottie Hellingman
- Cinematography: Piotr Kukla
- Edited by: Herman P. Koerts
- Music by: Fons Merkies
- Production companies: Nijenhuis & de Levita Film & TV; NCRV
- Distributed by: Universal Pictures International
- Release date: 17 September 2009
- Running time: 100 minutes
- Country: Netherlands
- Language: Dutch
- Budget: €6 million
- Box office: $6.9 million

The Storm (Dutch: De Storm) is a 2009 Dutch disaster film directed by Ben Sombogaart.

== Plot ==
A terrible storm causes hundreds of dikes to break in Zeeland, resulting in the North Sea flood of 1953. Julia, a single mother living with her parents, is caught in the middle of a catastrophic flood. She is rescued from drowning and taken to safety by her neighbor Aldo, who is a member of the armed forces. However, her baby is left in a wooden box in the attic of Julia's parental home. Together Julia and Aldo return to the disaster area to look for the baby. When they finally find the box, it is empty, and they conclude that someone must have taken the child. The child ended up with a woman who recently lost her own baby in a car accident. Julia met her but because the woman did not want to lose the baby, she hid him from Julia. Eighteen years later, Julia meets her son and the woman again and she finds out what has happened.

== Cast ==
- Sylvia Hoeks as Julia
- Barry Atsma as Aldo
- Dirk Roofthooft as Julia's Father
- Monic Hendrickx as Julia's Mother
- Katja Herbers as Krina
- Lottie Hellingman as Stientje
- Marlon Paris as Pietje

== Release ==
The film was released on DVD and Blu-ray by Universal Pictures Benelux on 21 January 2010.

== American award ==
In July 2010, The Storm won the 'Award for Outstanding Achievement in Filmmaking' on the Stony Brook Film Festival in New York City. Producer De Levita and actress Hoeks were attending.
