= Ralph Meeker =

American actor

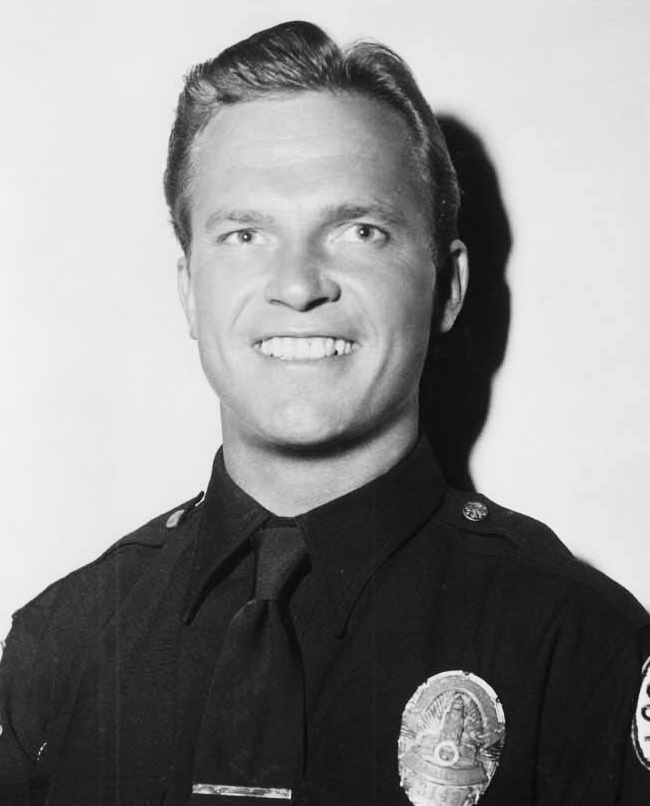
- Meeker in a photo for the MGM film Code Two (1953)
- Born: Ralph Rathgeber; November 21, 1920; Minneapolis, Minnesota, U.S.
- Died: August 5, 1988 (aged 67); Los Angeles, California, U.S.
- Occupation: Actor
- Years active: 1945–1980
- Spouses: Salome Jens (m. 1964; div. 1966); Millicent Meeker (before 1988)

Ralph Meeker (born Ralph Rathgeber; November 21, 1920 – August 5, 1988) was an American film, stage, and television actor. He first rose to prominence for his roles in the Broadway productions of Mister Roberts (1948–1951) and Picnic (1953), the former of which earned him a Theatre World Award for his performance. In film, Meeker is known for his portrayal of Mike Hammer in Robert Aldrich's 1955 Kiss Me Deadly and as condemned infantryman Cpl. Philippe Paris in Stanley Kubrick’s Paths of Glory.

Meeker went on to play a series of roles that used his husky and macho screen presence, including a lead role in Kubrick's military courtroom drama Paths of Glory (1957), as a troubled mechanic opposite Carroll Baker in Something Wild (1961), as a World War II captain in The Dirty Dozen (1967), and in the gangster film The St. Valentine's Day Massacre (1967). Other credits include supporting roles in I Walk the Line (1970) and Sidney Lumet's The Anderson Tapes (1971).

He also had a prolific career in television, appearing as Sergeant Steve Dekker on the series Not for Hire (1959–1960), and in the television horror film The Night Stalker (1972). After suffering a stroke in 1980, Meeker was forced to retire from acting, and died eight years later of a heart attack in Los Angeles, California.

== Early life ==
Meeker was born Ralph Rathgeber in Minneapolis, Minnesota on November 21, 1920, the son of Ralph and Magnhild Senovia Haavig Meeker Rathgeber. He spent his early life in Michigan and Chicago. Meeker attended the Leelanau School in Glen Arbor Township, Michigan, and later was made a member of its hall of fame. He graduated from Northwestern University in 1942, where he majored in music.

Meeker served in the United States Navy during World War II, but was discharged after a few months with a neck injury.

== Career ==
=== Stage work ===
Meeker began his career on stage, appearing in minor roles in the Broadway production of Strange Fruit (1946) directed by José Ferrer, which ran for 60 performances.

He followed it with a minor part in Cyrano de Bergerac (1946), starring Ferrer and directed by Mel Ferrer which went for 163 performances.

Meeker then starred on Broadway in Mister Roberts (1948–1951), directed by Joshua Logan and produced by Leland Hayward. Theatre World said he was one of the 12 most promising actors from the 1947–48 season. He was the understudy for Henry Fonda.

Meeker's big breakthrough came when he took over the role of Stanley Kowalski from Marlon Brando in the second year of the original Broadway production of A Streetcar Named Desire, directed by Elia Kazan. Logan and Hayward had Meeker under personal contract but agreed to release him from Mister Roberts. He started appearing in June 1949. He played the role until the Broadway run ended in December and then toured on the road with it.

Meeker played the supporting role of Mickey in the Broadway world premiere of Arthur Miller's After the Fall.

=== MGM Films ===
Meeker made his film debut in the Swiss-made Four in a Jeep (1951), directed by Leopold Lindtberg. He played a starring role alongside Viveca Lindfors.

Meeker was then signed to a term contract by MGM. which put him in Teresa (1951), directed by Fred Zinnemann. Meeker played a support role, a sergeant, and the film was very popular.

MGM then cast him in the leading role in Shadow in the Sky (1952), alongside Nancy Davis, later Nancy Reagan. The studio then tried him in Glory Alley (1952), billed above Leslie Caron and directed by Raoul Walsh. Both films flopped.

Paramount borrowed him to play Betty Hutton's leading man in Somebody Loves Me (1952), a musical. It was a minor hit.

Meeker's next two MGM films were very popular. He had a supporting role as a misfit ex-cavalryman in the classic Western The Naked Spur (1953) directed by Anthony Mann starring James Stewart. He was then in Jeopardy (1953), a well-received thriller with Barbara Stanwyck and Barry Sullivan. His final film for MGM was the crime movie Code Two (1953), which made a small loss.

Meeker also appeared on TV shows like The Revlon Mirror Theater and Lux Video Theatre.

=== Picnic ===
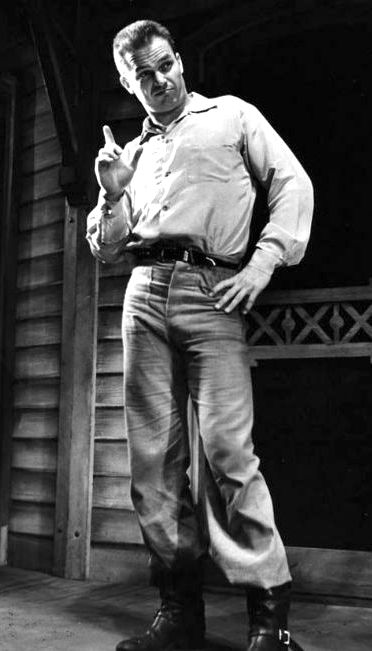
Meeker in a stage production of Picnic, 1954

In 1954, Meeker was cast in a Broadway production of William Inge's Picnic, directed by Logan and also starring Paul Newman and Janice Rule. The play was a critical and commercial success, running for 477 performances. Meeker was awarded the New York Critic's Circle Award in 1954.

Picnic became a classic film in 1955, with William Holden and Kim Novak starring in the roles originated by Meeker and Janice Rule. According to Turner Classic Movies, Meeker turned down the lead role because he did not wish to sign a long-term contract with the production company, and he never was offered a role of similar stature again.

Meeker returned to films playing a cold-blooded convict in Big House, U.S.A. (1955).

=== Kiss Me Deadly ===
In perhaps his most-remembered role, Meeker starred as private detective Mike Hammer in the 1955 Robert Aldrich film of Mickey Spillane's Kiss Me Deadly. Many years later, this film acquired cult status and was seen as an influence on French New Wave directors such as Jean-Luc Godard.

He then played a member of the French Foreign Legion in Desert Sands (1955). He was discussed to star in a Spillane sequel My Gun Is Quick.

On television, Meeker starred in the 1955 premiere episode, "Revenge", of Alfred Hitchcock Presents, along with Vera Miles. (He later appeared in three other Alfred Hitchcock segments.) He also guest-starred on shows like Studio One in Hollywood, Star Stage, The Alcoa Hour, Goodyear Playhouse, Jane Wyman Presents The Fireside Theatre, Studio 57, Zane Grey Theater, Playhouse 90, and The 20th Century Fox Hour.

In 1957, he portrayed an ex-convict who kidnaps and then falls for Jane Russell in the romantic comedy The Fuzzy Pink Nightgown, which failed at the box office.

More popular was the Sam Fuller Western Run of the Arrow (1957), with Meeker in a supporting role.

He produced the film Kindergarten in Germany.

=== Paths of Glory ===
That same year, he appeared in Stanley Kubrick's Paths of Glory, playing a soldier, Corporal Paris, accused of cowardice during battle in World War I.

Meeker returned to Broadway in 1958 to appear in Cloud 7 but it only ran 11 performances.

He continued to work heavily in TV on such shows as Climax!, Wagon Train, Kraft Television Theatre, Pursuit, Wanted: Dead or Alive, Schlitz Playhouse, The Loretta Young Show and Alfred Hitchcock Presents. Meeker was cast with Dorothy Provine in the 1959 episode "Blood Money" of the Western series The Texan, starring Rory Calhoun. He had the title role in the TV movie Dillinger (1960).

=== Not for Hire ===
From 1959 to 1960, Meeker had the leading role as Army Sergeant Steve Dekker in the 39-episode television series Not for Hire.

For Disney TV, he did Texas John Slaughter: Frank Clell's in Town (1961) with Tom Tryon. He also was seen in Tallahassee 7000.

In 1961, he starred in the political story Ada with Dean Martin, and in Jack Garfein's experimental drama Something Wild, in which he portrayed a mechanic who saves a young woman (Carroll Baker) from committing suicide, but then holds her captive in his apartment.

Meeker went back to Broadway to replace Eli Wallach in the production of Rhinoceros starring Zero Mostel. He was then in Something About a Soldier (1962) with Sal Mineo directed by Dore Schary; it ran 12 performances.

In 1962, Meeker portrayed Jack Slade in the episode "The Crooked Angel" of the drama series Going My Way, starring Gene Kelly as a Catholic priest in New York City and loosely based on 1944 film of the same name. He was also cast in 1962 as Barney Swanton in the episode "Walk Like a King" of the Western series Empire, starring Richard Egan. He was also in episodes of The United States Steel Hour, and Route 66.

In 1963, he appeared as Murray Knopf in "The Bull Roarer" on Breaking Point, starring Paul Richards and Eduard Franz.

During the Cold War, he appeared in a 1963 U.S. Department of Defense informational film Town of the Times, which encouraged the construction of public fallout shelters. He was in the feature film Wall of Noise (1963) at Warners.

Meeker guest-starred as Frank Marin in the 1964 episode "Swing for the Moon" of Channing, co-starring Jason Evers and Henry Jones. He was also in The Outer Limits, The Defenders, Suspense, The Doctors and the Nurses, and Kraft Suspense Theatre.

=== Repertory on Broadway ===
He returned to Broadway in 1964 for After the Fall by Arthur Miller, directed by Kazan and starring Jason Robards Jr. and Barbara Loden. It ran for 208 performances. The play was done in repertory with But For Whom Charlie, also directed by Kazan with Meeker (and Faye Dunaway), but it was not as successful.

In 1965 Meeker was in Mrs. Dally Had a Lover on Broadway, which ran 53 performances. He guest-starred on The Long, Hot Summer, Seaway, The Green Hornet, and Tarzan.

Meeker later appeared in the 1967 crime drama The St. Valentine's Day Massacre, in which he played gangster George "Bugs" Moran.

Meeker was also in the 1967 war film The Dirty Dozen as Captain Stuart Kinder, a military psychologist who attempts to analyze the men. Meeker portrayed police officers in The Detective (1968) with Frank Sinatra and The Anderson Tapes (1970) with Sean Connery.

Meeker also starred in Gentle Giant (1967), A Punt, a Pass, and a Prayer (1968), and The Devil's 8 (1968) and guest starred on Dundee and the Culhane, The High Chaparral, and The Name of the Game.

=== 1970s ===
Meeker worked steadily through the 1970s. He was in the TV film Lost Flight (1970), the feature I Walk the Line (1970), and episodes of The Virginian and The F.B.I., as well as the TV movie The Reluctant Heroes of Hill 656 (1971).

In 1971, he appeared on television as Kermit Teller in the episode "Glory Rider" of the Western Custer, with Wayne Maunder in the title role.

That year, he was a replacement cast member in a stage production of The House of Blue Leaves.

Meeker was in episodes of Primus, Room 222, Faraday & Company, Ironside, Toma, The Evil Touch, Police Surgeon, Cannon, The Rookies, Movin' On, Barbary Coast, Police Story, Run, Joe, Run, Harry O, Police Woman, The Eddie Capra Mysteries, and CHiPs.

In 1971, Meeker played FBI agent Bernie Jenks in the TV movie The Night Stalker. He was in TV movies The Mind Snatchers (1972), Birds of Prey (1973), You'll Never See Me Again (1973), Cry Panic (1974), Night Games (1974), The Girl on the Late, Late Show (1974), and The Dead Don't Die (1975).

He made Love Comes Quietly (1973) in Holland and worked in the John Wayne film Brannigan (1974). He was second-billed in Johnny Firecloud (1975) and had a part in The Food of the Gods (1976).

He was also in Hi-Riders (1978) and starred in The Alpha Incident (1978).

=== Final years ===
Meeker was an executive producer on My Boys Are Good Boys (1978), which he also appeared in. He had a role in Winter Kills (1979).

Meeker's final screen role was in the independent science-fiction-horror film Without Warning (1980), about an alien landing. The film received negative reviews from critics, with Tom Buckley of The New York Times calling the film "illogical and predictable."

== Personal life ==
Meeker married actress Salome Jens on July 20, 1964, and they were divorced in 1966. He also married Millicent Meeker.

== Death ==
In 1980, he suffered a severe stroke, which forced him to retire from acting. His health steadily declined, punctuated by several more strokes. He spent the last year of his life in the Motion Picture & Television Country House and Hospital in Los Angeles, and died there, age 67, of a heart attack.

== Filmography ==
=== Film ===
| Year | Title | Role | Notes |
|---|---|---|---|
| 1951 | Die Vier im Jeep | Sergeant William Long | |
| 1951 | Teresa | Sergeant Dobbs | |
| 1952 | Shadow in the Sky | Burt | |
| 1952 | Glory Alley | Socks Barbarrosa | |
| 1953 | Somebody Loves Me | Ben 'Benny' Fields | |
| 1953 | The Naked Spur | Roy Anderson | |
| 1953 | Jeopardy | Lawson | |
| 1953 | Code Two | Chuck O'Flair | |
| 1955 | Big House, U.S.A. | Jerry Barker | |
| 1955 | Kiss Me Deadly | Mike Hammer | |
| 1955 | Desert Sands | Captain David Malcolm | |
| 1956 | A Woman's Devotion | Trevor Stevenson | |
| 1957 | The Fuzzy Pink Nightgown | Mike Vala | |
| 1957 | Run of the Arrow | Lieutenant Driscoll | |
| 1957 | Paths of Glory | Corporal Philippe Paris | |
| 1960 | Dillinger | John Dillinger | television film |
| 1961 | Ada | Colonel Yancey | |
| 1961 | Something Wild | Mike | |
| 1963 | Wall of Noise | Matt Rubio | |
| 1967 | The Dirty Dozen | Captain Stuart Kinder | |
| 1967 | The St. Valentine's Day Massacre | George Clarence 'Bugs' Moran | |
| 1967 | Gentle Giant | Fog Hanson | |
| 1968 | The Detective | Curran | |
| 1968 | A Punt, a Pass, and a Prayer | Wally Walters | television film |
| 1969 | The Devil's 8 | Burl | |
| 1969 | Lost Flight | Glenn Walkup | TV movie |
| 1970 | I Walk the Line | Carl McCain | |
| 1971 | The Anderson Tapes | 'Iron Balls' Delaney | |
| 1971 | The Reluctant Heroes | Captain Luke Danvers | ABC Movie of the Week |
| 1972 | The Night Stalker | Bernie Jenks | ABC Movie of the Week |
| 1972 | The Happiness Cage | The Major | also known as The Mind Snatchers and The Demon |
| 1973 | Birds of Prey | Jim McAndrew | TV movie |
| 1973 | You'll Never See Me Again | Will Alden | ABC Movie of the Week |
| 1973 | Love Comes Quietly | Ben Hoeksema | |
| 1974 | Cry Panic | Chuck Brunswell | ABC Movie of the Week |
| 1974 | Night Games | Dutch Armbreck | TV movie |
| 1974 | The Girl on the Late, Late Show | Inspector DeBiesse | TV movie |
| 1975 | The Dead Don't Die | Police Lieutenant Reardon | TV movie |
| 1975 | Brannigan | Captain Moretti | |
| 1975 | Johnny Firecloud | Colby | |
| 1976 | The Food of the Gods | Bensington | |
| 1978 | Hi-Riders | Mike | |
| 1978 | The Alpha Incident | Charlie | |
| 1978 | My Boys Are Good Boys | Bert Morton | |
| 1979 | Winter Kills | Gameboy Baker | |
| 1980 | Without Warning | Dave | |

=== Television ===
| Year | Title | Role | Notes |
|---|---|---|---|
| 1952–1956 | Goodyear Television Playhouse | —N/a | 2 episodes |
| 1952–1956 | Lux Video Theatre | Mike / Nicky Hanks | 2 episodes |
| 1953 | The Revlon Mirror Theater | —N/a | 2 episodes |
| 1953 | The Alcoa Hour | Billy Hepburn | 1 episode |
| 1955–1956 | Studio One in Hollywood | Mr. Sheridan / Steve | 2 episodes |
| 1955 | Alfred Hitchcock Presents | Carl Spann | Season 1 Episode 1: "Revenge" |
| 1956 | Star Stage | —N/a | 1 episode |
| 1956 | Jane Wyman Presents The Fireside Theatre | Joe Novak | 1 episode |
| 1956 | Studio 57 | Ranson | 1 episode |
| 1957 | Alfred Hitchcock Presents | Carl Borden | Season 2 Episode 20: "Malice Domestic" |
| 1957 | Zane Grey Theater | Steve Elkins | 1 episode |
| 1957 | Playhouse 90 | Carbine Webb | 1 episode |
| 1957 | The 20th Century Fox Hour | Commander John Lawrence | 1 episode |
| 1957–1958 | Climax! | 'Griff' Griffith / Alex Hill | 2 episodes |
| 1958 | Pursuit | —N/a | 1 episode |
| 1958 | Wagon Train | Horse | 1 episode |
| 1958–59 | Schlitz Playhouse of Stars | Barry Brannon / Rich Adams | 2 episodes |
| 1958–1961 | The Loretta Young Show | Various | 4 episodes |
| 1959 | Alfred Hitchcock Presents | Mel Reeves | Season 4 Episode 17: "Total Loss" |
| 1959 | Alfred Hitchcock Presents | John Forbes | Season 4 Episode 23: "I'll Take Care of You" |
| 1959 | Wanted: Dead or Alive | Martin Ash | 1 episode |
| 1959 | The Texan | Sam Kerrigan | 1 episode |
| 1959–1960 | Not for Hire | Sergeant Steve Dekker | 39 episodes |
| 1961 | Walt Disney's Wonderful World of Color | Franc Clell | 1 episode |
| 1961 | Tallahassee 7000 | Harry Griffold | 1 episode |
| 1962 | Going My Way | Jack Slade | 1 episode |
| 1962 | Empire | Barney Swanton | 1 episode |
| 1962–1963 | The United States Steel Hour | Charlie Williams | 2 episodes |
| 1962–1963 | Route 66 | Parker Smith / Willard McIntyre | 2 episodes |
| 1963 | Breaking Point | Murray Knopf | 1 episode |
| 1963 | The Outer Limits | John Dexter | 1 episode |
| 1964 | The Defenders | Floyd Cooper | 1 episode |
| 1964 | Channing | Frank Martin | 1 episode |
| 1964 | The Doctors and the Nurses | Sheffer | 1 episode |
| 1964 | Suspense | —N/a | 1 episode |
| 1964 | Kraft Suspense Theatre | Harly Clay | 1 episode |
| 1966 | The Long, Hot Summer | Jess Corbett | 1 episode |
| 1966 | Seaway | Roy Burke | 1 episode |
| 1966–1971 | The F.B.I. | Graham Newcomb / Scott Martin / King Hogan | 3 episodes |
| 1967 | The Green Hornet | Earl Evans | 1 episode |
| 1967 | Tarzan | Karnak | 1 episode |
| 1967 | Custer | Kermit Teller | 1 episode |
| 1967 | Dundee and the Culhane | Maximus Tobin | 1 episode |
| 1967 | The High Chaparral | Tracy Conlin | 1 episode |
| 1968 | The Name of the Game | Senator Goddard | 1 episode |
| 1968–1974 | Ironside | Wescott / Ex-Detective | 2 episodes |
| 1970 | The Virginian | August Gruber | 1 episode |
| 1972–1974 | Police Surgeon | James Blinn | 2 episodes |
| 1973–1975 | Police Story | Alfred Attles / Sergeant Emit Howard / Chief Harry Stahlgaher | 3 episodes |
| 1974 | Room 222 | Mr. Jones | 1 episode |
| 1974 | Faraday & Company | Ed Kelso | 1 episode |
| 1974 | Toma | Frank Beecher | 1 episode |
| 1974 | The Evil Touch | Frank Drake | 2 episodes |
| 1975 | Cannon | Phil Dexter | 1 episode |
| 1975 | The Rookies | Officer Menteer | 1 episode |
| 1975 | Movin' On | Dave Bennet | 1 episode |
| 1975 | Barbary Coast | Big Lou Hobart | 1 episode |
| 1975 | Run, Joe, Run | Gant | 1 episode |
| 1975 | Harry O | Sergeant Frank Brannen | 1 episode |
| 1977 | Police Woman | Bellwood | 1 episode |
| 1979 | CHiPs | Jerry Borgman | 1 episode |

== Stage credits ==
| Year | Title | Role | Notes |
|---|---|---|---|
| 1945–46 | Strange Fruit | Chuck | |
| 1946–47 | Cyrano de Bergerac | Lackey | |
| 1947–49 | A Streetcar Named Desire | Stanley Kowalski | |
| 1948–1951 | Mister Roberts | Mannion | Theatre World Award |
| 1953–54 | Picnic | Hal Carter | |
| 1958 | Cloud 7 | Newton Reece | |
| 1961 | Rhinoceros | Berrenger | |
| 1962 | Something About a Soldier | Toat | |
| 1964 | But for Whom Charlie | Charles Taney | |
| 1964–65 | After the Fall | Mickey | |
| 1965 | Mrs. Dally Had a Lover | Sam | |

== Works cited ==
- Hoberman, J. (2007). "Review of Kiss Me Deadly". In Lim, Dennis (ed.). The Village Voice Film Guide – 50 Years of Movies from Classics to Cult Hits. New York City: John Wiley & Sons. ISBN 978-0-471-78781-5.
- Maltin, Leonard (1994). Leonard Maltin's Movie and Video Guide: 1990 Edition. Plume. ISBN 978-0-452-26316-1.
- Keaney, Michael F. (2010). Film Noir Guide: 745 Films of the Classic Era, 1940–1959. McFarland. ISBN 978-0-786-46366-4.
- Monush, Barry (2003). Screen World Presents the Encyclopedia of Hollywood Film Actors: From the Silent Era to 1965. Vol. 1. Applause. ISBN 978-1-557-83551-2.
- Muir, Kenneth (2012). Horror Films of the 1980s. Vol. 1. McFarland. ISBN 978-0-786-47298-7.
