= Love Comes Quietly =

1973 film

- Directed by: Nikolai van der Heyde
- Written by: Nikolai van der Heyde; André Kuyten
- Produced by: Henk Bos
- Starring: Barbara Hershey
- Cinematography: Jörgen Persson
- Edited by: August Verschueren
- Music by: Georges Delerue
- Release date: June 1973
- Running time: 113 minutes
- Countries: Belgium; Netherlands
- Languages: English; Dutch

Love Comes Quietly is a 1973 Belgian-Dutch drama film directed by Nikolai van der Heyde. It was entered into the 23rd Berlin International Film Festival. Barbara Hershey won a gold medal at the Atlanta Film Festival for her role in this film.

== Plot ==
An American returns to his native Dutch village and causes a sensation there. When his pregnant stepdaughter starts an affair with the son of the local cheese-factory owner, the conservative village starts to despise her.

== Cast ==
- Sandy van der Linden - Harm-Wouter
- Barbara Hershey - Angela (as Barbara Seagull)
- Ralph Meeker - Ben Hoeksema
- Ward de Ravet - Menno Dijkstra
- Kitty Janssen - Louise Dijkstra
- Onno Molenkamp - Vicar Dominee de Vries (as Onno Tuinman)
- Frans Mulder - Wiebke
- Fanny Winkler - Geesje
- Hanneke Reijnders - Renske de Vries
- Romain DeConinck - Waard Meindersma
- Hero Muller - Krolse knecht
- Roel Nijboer - Norse boer
- Henk O'Breen - Notabele
- Geert Thijssens - Jensen
- Gietema Ype - Notary

== Production ==
When Barbara Hershey agreed to participate in this film, she was six months pregnant and so Nikolai van der Heyde rewrote his screenplay to suit her condition.
