= The Happiness Cage =

1972 film

- Directed by: Bernard Girard
- Written by: Dennis Reardon; Ron Whyte
- Starring: Christopher Walken; Joss Ackland; Ralph Meeker
- Distributed by: Cinerama Releasing Corporation
- Release date: 1972
- Running time: 94 minutes
- Countries: Denmark; United States
- Language: English

The Happiness Cage is a 1972 American science fiction film directed by Bernard Girard. The film stars Christopher Walken in his first starring role and Joss Ackland. The film was also known as The Mind Snatchers and The Demon Within.

== Plot ==
After an altercation at a party given by his girlfriend, U.S. Army private James Reese is arrested for assault. Reese comes to the attention of Major, the head of Army program attempting to help those with terminal illnesses deal with their pain via a brain implant. Reese is determined to suffer from schizophrenia, making him an excellent candidate for the experimental program. Dr. Frederick is trying to find a way to ease the aggressive nature of soldiers by developing a microchip to access the pleasure centers of their brains.

Reese is transferred to the Veterans Hospital in Frankfurt, where the experiments are being conducted by United States Army. However, the experiment has taken a darker turn.

The Army doctors are drilling into the patients’ skulls, attach wires, and alter their brains to create better soldiers and happier men — human robots. The patients are three veterans waiting to go into the operation clinic. The implant is placed into Reese. Another soldier with the implant goes berserk, and after Reese rips the wires and connections away from the soldier, the soldier dies. Reese escapes the hospital but is recaptured. He refuses to activate the implant, but the Major overrides his decision and activates it.

Reese, now docile and controlled by the Major, appears at a press conference as proof of the success of the program.

== Cast ==
- Christopher Walken as Pvt. James H. Reese
- Joss Ackland as Dr. Frederick
- Ralph Meeker as The Major
- Ronny Cox as Sgt. Boford Miles
- Marco St. John as Lawrence Shannon
- Bette Henritze as Anna Kraus
- Susan Travers as Nurse Schroeder
- Birthe Neumann as Lisa
- Claus Nissen as Army Psychiatrist

== Production ==
This film is based on Dennis J. Reardon’s acclaimed play The Happiness Cage, which opened at Joseph Papp Public Theater’s Newman Theater in New York on October 4, 1970.

== Reception ==
According to a review in The New York Times the film contains some brilliant performances. They write-up also states that the story works better as a play than a movie, although Walken's performance was found to be gripping.

The Encyclopedia of Science Fiction finds the movie limited by its low budget and its origins as a stage play, but noted it explores some of the same themes as the later A Clockwork Orange.

TV Guide found the movie had some very interesting parts, but that the movie was ultimately unsuccessful. It praised the work of Walken, but found the direction needs a more imaginative approach, and dialogue artificial.
