= Nikolai van der Heyde =

Dutch film director (1936–2020)

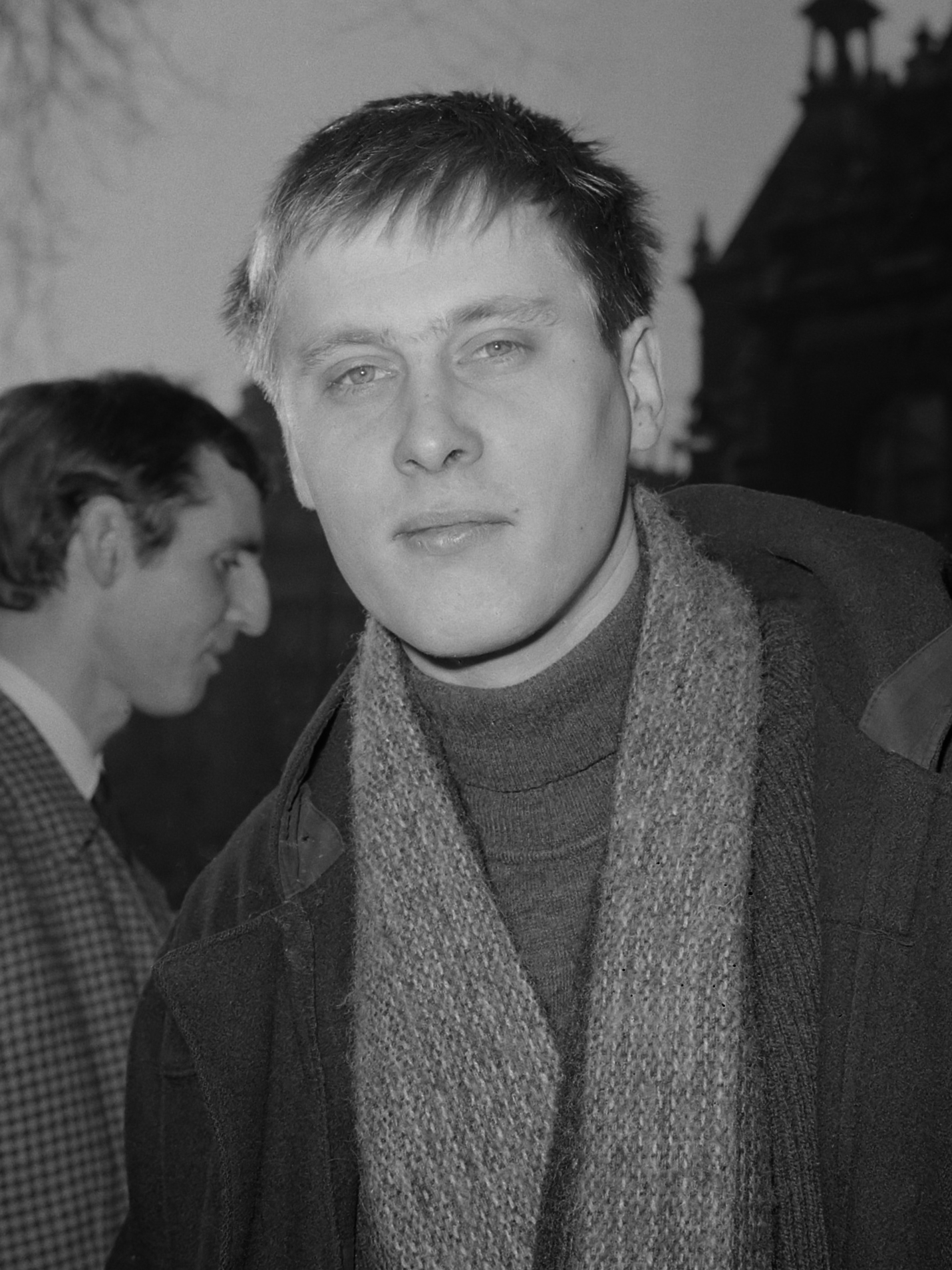
- Nikolai van der Heyde (1965)
- Born: 23 January 1936; Leeuwarden, Netherlands
- Died: 6 August 2020 (aged 84); Laren, North Holland, Netherlands
- Occupations: Film director Screenwriter
- Years active: 1966 – 1996

Nikolai van der Heyde (23 January 1936 – 6 August 2020) was a Dutch film director and screenwriter.

== Biography ==
Van der Heyde graduated from the Netherlands Film Academy in 1964. Through this course he had the opportunity to make two short films, and he was considered one of the most talented students of his class. In the same year he founded the film magazine Skoop together with Wim Verstappen and Pim de la Parra. Partly with the support of beer magnate Alfred Heineken, he was able to make his first full-length film in 1966: A Morning of Six Weeks (Een Ochtend van Zes Weken). The film received good reviews at home and abroad, but the audience stayed away.

Van der Heyde focused more on an international market for his films. His 1968 film To Grab the Ring was entered into the 18th Berlin International Film Festival. Five years later, his film Love Comes Quietly was entered into the 23rd Berlin International Film Festival. Van der Heyde was a lover of Hollywood films, and would often choose English or American actors. He then turned to the comedy Help, the doctor is drowning! (a novel by Toon Kortooms) which would become his greatest success with the general public. His career took off after that. Its successor, Let the doctor slide, was a flop. After the next film Nitwits, Van der Heyde directed German television series.

Van der Heyde died on 6 August 2020, at the age of 84 in the Rosa Spier House in Laren.[1][2]

== Selected filmography ==
- Erste Liebe (2004)
- Hilde (1998)
- Monsieur Dupont arrives a little bit later (1995)
- Abschied im Dunkel (1995)
- Alter is nur ein Zahl (1994)
- Nederlandse Spoorwegen (1994)
- Abschied im Advent (1992)
- Die Wahrheit schmerzt (1992)
- Antique currents (1988)
- Nitwits (1987)
- Gateway to Europe (1985)
- Laat de dokter maar schuiven (1980)
- De dwaze lotgevallen van Sherlock Jones (1979)
- Help, de dokter verzuipt! (1974)
- Love Comes Quietly... (Angela) (1971)
- 11.50 uit Zürich (1969)
- To Grab the Ring (1968)
- Een ochtend van zes weken (1966)
- De boogschutter (1965)
- De kegelbaan (1963)
- Een drup op de tong (1962)
