= Ben Carruthers =

American actor (1936–1983)

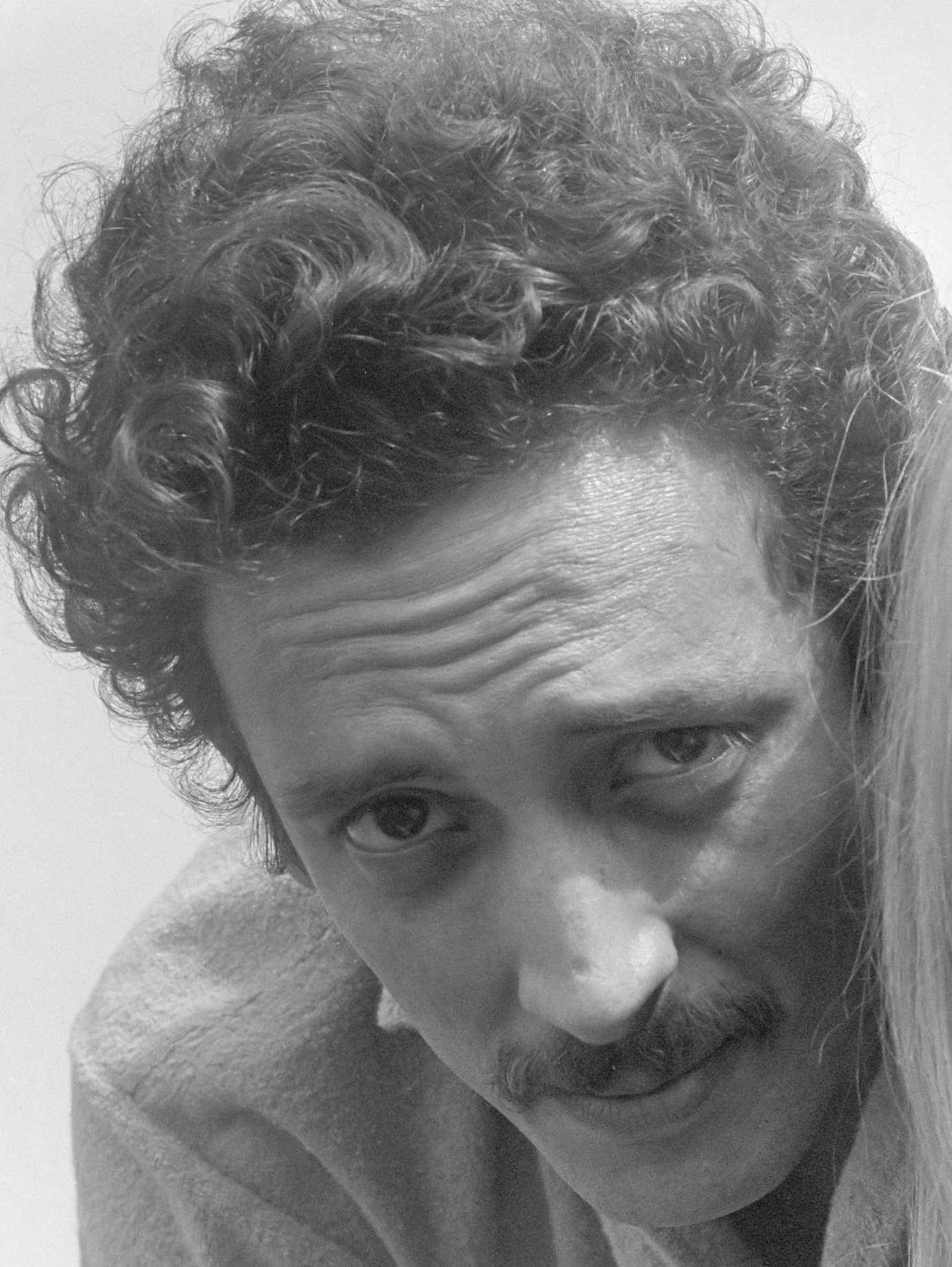
- Carruthers in 1967
- Born: August 14, 1936; Illinois, US
- Died: September 27, 1983 (aged 47); Los Angeles, California, US
- Occupation: Actor
- Years active: 1957–1971
- Children: 2

Benito F. Carruthers (August 14, 1936 – September 27, 1983) was an American film actor, most notable for his role in John Cassavetes' debut feature film Shadows (1959). His other films included A High Wind in Jamaica (1965), Robert Aldrich's The Dirty Dozen (1967) as Glenn Gilpin, Fearless Frank (1967), To Grab the Ring (1968), The Lost Continent (1968), Riot (1969) as the unpredictable and psychotic Joe Surefoot, Man in the Wilderness (1971), and Universal Soldier (1971).

== Personal life ==
Carruthers stood 6 ft 1 in (1.85 m).

His first son, Caine Carruthers, was a bass player and was in ska band The Untouchables. Dijon Carruthers, his second son, was Megadeth's first drummer in 1983.

== Musical career ==
As lead singer of Ben Carruthers and the Deep, he recorded the track "Jack O' Diamonds" in 1965, a song he co-wrote using lyrics given to him by Bob Dylan.

== Filmography ==
Feature films
Year	Title	Role	Notes
1958	The Beast of Budapest	Sentry	Uncredited
1959	Shadows	Ben	
1961	Guns of the Trees	Ben	
1964	Goldstein	Jay	
1964	Lilith	Benito	Uncredited
1965	Love 65	Benito	
1965	A High Wind in Jamaica	Alberto	
1965	Scruggs	Ben	
1967	Fearless Frank	The Cat	
1967	The Unknown Man of Shandigor	Manual / Manuel	
1967	The Dirty Dozen	Glenn Gilpin	
1968	To Grab the Ring	Alfred Lowell, Acteur	
1968	The Lost Continent	Ricaldi	
1969	Riot	Surefoot	
1971	Man in the Wilderness	Longbow	
1971	Universal Soldier	Jesse	

== Television ==
Television Appearances
Year	Title	Role	Notes
1958	Gunsmoke	Rufe Tucker	Episode: "The Cast"
