= The Public Eye (film) =

1992 film by Howard Franklin

- Theatrical release poster
- Directed by: Howard Franklin
- Written by: Howard Franklin
- Produced by: Sue Baden-Powell
- Starring: Joe Pesci; Barbara Hershey
- Cinematography: Peter Suschitzky
- Edited by: Evan A. Lottman
- Music by: Mark Isham
- Production company: South Side Amusement Company
- Distributed by: Universal Pictures
- Release dates: September 15, 1992 (Toronto Festival of Festivals); October 14, 1992 (New York City)
- Running time: 99 minutes
- Country: United States
- Language: English
- Budget: $15 million
- Box office: $3,067,917

The Public Eye is a 1992 American crime thriller film produced by Sue Baden-Powell and written and directed by Howard Franklin, starring Joe Pesci and Barbara Hershey. Stanley Tucci and Richard Schiff appear in supporting roles.

The film is loosely based on New York Daily News photographer Arthur "Weegee" Fellig, and some of the photos in the film were taken by Fellig.

== Plot ==
In the 1940s, Leon "Bernzy" Bernstein is a freelance crime and street photographer for the New York City tabloids, dedicated to his vivid and realistic work and his unique ability to capture shots that nobody else can. He is very confident of his skills, declaring at one point, "Nobody does what I do. Nobody".

With a police radio under the dashboard of his car and a makeshift darkroom in his trunk, he quickly races to the scene of horrific crimes and accidents in order to snap exclusive photographs. He is so good at his job that he becomes known affectionately as the "Great Bernzini".

Bernzy meets a sultry widow, Kay Levitz, who owns a fancy nightclub. It seems the mob is muscling in on her due to some arrangement with her late husband. Kay asks if Bernzy could investigate an individual she considers troublesome. Generally unsuccessful with women, Bernzy agrees to help Kay, and he slowly begins to fall in love with her.

After talking to his contacts, including journalist friend Arthur Nabler, he tracks down Kay's man, only to find him murdered. But when he calls the police, he becomes a suspect in the man's death. The police and the FBI are also very interested in this case. Bernstein makes a connection with a local gangster, Sal, uncovering a conspiracy involving a mob turf war about illegal gas rationing, and the Federal government. His activities get Sal killed and place Bernzy's life in great danger as he waits in hiding at an Italian restaurant where a mob hit is about to take place.

== Cast ==
- Joe Pesci as Leon "Bernzy" Bernstein
- Barbara Hershey as Kay Levitz
- Stanley Tucci as Sal
- Jerry Adler as Arthur Nabler
- Dominic Chianese as Spoleto
- Richard Riehle as Officer O'Brien
- Richard Schiff as Thompson, Street Photographer
- Jared Harris as Danny, The Doorman
- Christian Stolte as Ambulance Attendant
- Jack Denbo as Photo Editor
- Timothy Hendrickson as Richard Rineman
- Del Close as H.R. Rineman
- Nick Tate as Henry Haddock Jr.
- Lisa Christakis as Young Bride With Soldier Husband

== Production ==
Joe Pesci took this role right after his Oscar-winning performance in Goodfellas. It was an attempt to capitalize on his popularity at the time and help elevate Pesci from respected character actor to star status.

Director and writer Howard Franklin was unable to secure the rights to Arthur "Weegee" Fellig's story. Franklin, then, wrote the story of a Weegee-like photographer who smokes cigars and he named him Leon "Bernzy" Bernstein. In the film, like Weegee, cops wonder if Bernzy uses a ouija board to snap his photographs and find the stories.

According to journalist Doug Trapp, Franklin was inspired to write the screenplay after seeing a show of Fellig's photos in the 1980s at the International Center of Photography in New York City. And Weegee did, in real life, have a "soul-mate" named Wilma Wilcox, who was the woman in charge of his estate. But, Franklin has always denied that the film was about their relationship.

As the film is loosely modelled on Weegee, but the story is not, several photographers' pictures, along with some by Weegee, stand in for his work, including those of Lisette Model, Mickey Pallas, Wilbert H. Blanche, Irving Haberman, Ray Platnick, Roger Smith and Charles Steinheimer. Director Franklin says he was looking for "edgy, modern, high-contrast 40's" lighting and compositions with the “stark, rather lurid effects of flash, which pick out the central subject while everything around falls off rapidly into darkness”

=== Filming ===
The Public Eye began filming on July 24, 1991, and completed October 28, 1991.

Even though the film takes place in Manhattan, it was shot in Chicago, Illinois, Cincinnati, Ohio, and Los Angeles, California.

== Release ==
The producers used the following tagline when marketing the film:

Murder. Scandal. Crime. No matter what he was shooting, "The Great Bernzini" never took sides he only took pictures ... Except once.

The film premiered at the Toronto Festival of Festivals in September 1992. The film also was shown at the Venice Film Festival and the Valladolid International Film Festival in Spain.

It opened on October 14, 1992, in New York City and Los Angeles and expanded to 635 theatres two days later.

The film's box office performance was a disappointment. The film grossed $1,139,825 for the weekend and the total receipts after 12 days were $3,067,917.

=== Home media ===
The film was released on VHS on April 14, 1993 and featured Cynthia D Maddy (née Alvarez) in a scene with Joe Pesci on the backcover. This iconic scene was not included on the packaging of the LaserDisc which was released seven days later on April 21, 1993.

In September 2007 an Unbox Digital Video Download was made available. The movie is also available at Amazon.com as digital Video on Demand.

It was released on DVD on January 31, 2011, in the Universal Vault Series. It was released on Blu-ray from Kino Lorber on July 28, 2020.

== Reception ==
=== Critical response ===
Chicago Sun-Times film critic, Roger Ebert, was especially complimentary of the film and of actor Joe Pesci, and wrote, "One of the best things about the movie is the way it shows us how seriously Bernzy takes his work. He doesn't talk about it. He does it, with that cigar stuck in his mug, leading the way with the big, ungainly Speed Graphic with the glass flashbulbs. In the movie's big scene of a mob assassination, he stares death in the face to get a great picture." Ebert said the film made him "think" a little bit of Casablanca (1942).

Time Out magazine liked the acting and the script, and wrote, "The main virtue of screenwriter Franklin's debut as director is Pesci's portrayal of Weegee, the famous low-life tabloid photographer of urban disaster, lightly concealed as Bernstein, 'The Great Bernzini'... good dialogue, nice period recreation, great performances."

Desson Howe, film critic for The Washington Post wrote, "Public wants to be taken for an atmospheric film noir, full of intrigue, romance and street toughness. But it's all flash and no picture. Despite the usual quippy, perky performance from Pesci, as well as cinematographer Peter Suschitzky's moodily delineated images, the movie is superficial and unengaging. It's as if Life magazine decided to make an oldtime gangster movie."

Rotten Tomatoes gives the film a rating of 61% from 18 reviews.

== Soundtrack ==
The original score for the film was written and recorded by Jerry Goldsmith, but he was replaced by Mark Isham at a late stage. As such, Isham had a lot of work to do and in a short time. He later noted that he found working with director Franklin a wonderful and educational experience.

A motion picture original soundtrack was released on October 13, 1992, under the Varèse Sarabande label. The CD contained nineteen tracks in total, with one by Shorty Rogers. Mark Isham crafts a dark melody focusing on piano, string, and trumpet parts, while mixing in symphonic, jazz, and electronic music.

While originally thought lost or incomplete, Jerry Goldsmith's original score was later released by Intrada Records in 2021. Goldsmith's score features 22 tracks and a run time of just over 40 minutes, proving its completion prior to the change.
