= Rik Launspach =

Dutch actor, writer and director

- Born: 19 July 1958 (age 67); Arnhem, Gelderland, The Netherlands
- Occupations: Actor; Writer; Director
- Years active: 1983–Present
- Spouse: Marjolein Beumer
- Children: 2
- Website: www.riklaunspach.nl

Rik Launspach (born 19 July 1958, in Arnhem, Gelderland, The Netherlands) is a Dutch actor, writer and director. He is married to actress Marjolein Beumer and is the brother-in-law to Famke Janssen and Antoinette Beumer.

== Early life and career ==
Launspach began his career in theatre, he was rejected four times, only the fifth time he was accepted at the theatre academy in Amsterdam. Immediately after graduation, he founded two theatre companies, The Case in 1986 and The Trust in 1988. Between those two years he was on stage almost every day. He played the lead roles in many films and TV shows and directed several pieces.

In the late 1990s, he interrupted his career in the theatre, along with his wife Marjolein Beumer, to devote his time entirely to writing. In 2006 they made their first short film together, a TV series and a feature film.

In 2007, Launspach decided to start writing books, and in 2009 he released his debut novel 1953, referring to the year in which the Dutch dikes broke resulting in the big flood. The book was filmed, and renamed De Storm.

In September 2011, his second novel, Man Meisje Dood, was released.

== Theatre ==
- His (1987)
- The Seagull (1988)
- Krieg (1988)
- Pentisileia (1989)
- Platonov (1990)
- Faecalientrilogie, Schwab (1991–1993)
- Old People (1999)
- The Goat (2003)

== Films and television ==
- Kanaal 13 (1983), (1 episode - Een Beetje Verliefd)
- Zeg 'ns Aaa (1987), (1 episode - Echokabouter)
- De Tong van de Wet (1988), (TV)
- Jan Rap en z'n Maat (1989)
- De gulle Minnaar (1990) - Lucas
- Kracht (1990), (Vijour/Vigor) - Sjors
- Bij nader Inzien (1991), (TV mini-series) - Maarten Koning (Jong)
- Coverstory (1993), (1 episode - De Sluipwegen van de Dood)
- Oeroeg (1993) - Johan
- 1000 Rosen (1994) - Mr. Marshall
- De Vlinder tilt de Kat Op (1994) - Anton
- Pleidooi (1994), (Called to the Bar) - Vader Kamstra
- De Partizanen (1995), (TV mini-series) - Rokus
- In Namm der Koningin (1996), (TV series) - Dirk Vierkens
- 12 Steden, 13 Ongelukken (1991 & 1997), (2 episodes) - Paul
- Het Jarr van de Opvolging (1998), (TV mini-series) - Gijs van Dorp
- Oud Geld (1998), (3 episodes) - Robbert Donselaar
- Windkracht 10 (1998), (1 episode - Wie Zoet is, Krijgt Lekkers) - Ronald Brenneman
- Quidam, Quidam (1999) - Pro-deo Lawyer
- Innamorata (1999) - Hitman
- Baantjer (1996 & 1999), (2 episodes) - Karel Engel
- The Delivery (1999) - Spike
- Vroeger Bestaat niet Meer (2001), (TV) - Quinten Mensch
- De Vanger (2003) - Brother Ruben
- De duistere diamant (2004), (The Dark Diamond) - Baron Roger de Lacheloze
- Bezet (2004), (Writer)
- Manderlay (2005) - Stanley Mays
- Van Speijk (2006–2007), (26 episodes) - Det. Lucas Visbeen
- Aspe (2007), (1 episode - Hoog Spel) - Arie Schippers
- Moes (2008), (TV mini-series) - Det. De Ru (also Director)
- Taartman (2009), (TV) - Bertrand
- De Storm (2009), (The Storm) - Majoor Vos (also Writer)
- Pauw & Witterman (2009), (1 episode - #3.82) - as himself
- De Gelukkige Huisvrouw (2010) - Dr. Kallenback
- Meiden van de Wit (2002–2010), (38 episodes) - Roy Geertse

== Awards ==
- 1993 - Golden Calf for Best Actor for his role in "Oeroeg"
- 1993 - "Arlecchino" for best supporting role "Schwab Trilogy"
- 1994 - Nomination "Arlecchino" for role in "Platonov"
- 1995 - "Best Actor" best TV drama production "Partisans"
- 1999 - "Geneva-Europe Prize" screenplay "Azara" city of a thousand bridges
