= On Golden Pond =

On Golden Pond may refer to:

- On Golden Pond (play), a 1979 play by Ernest Thompson
- On Golden Pond (1981 film), a film adaptation of the play, starring Katharine Hepburn and Henry Fonda
- On Golden Pond (2001 film), a television adaptation of the play, starring Julie Andrews and Christopher Plummer
