= Ernest Thompson =

American writer, actor, and director (born 1949)

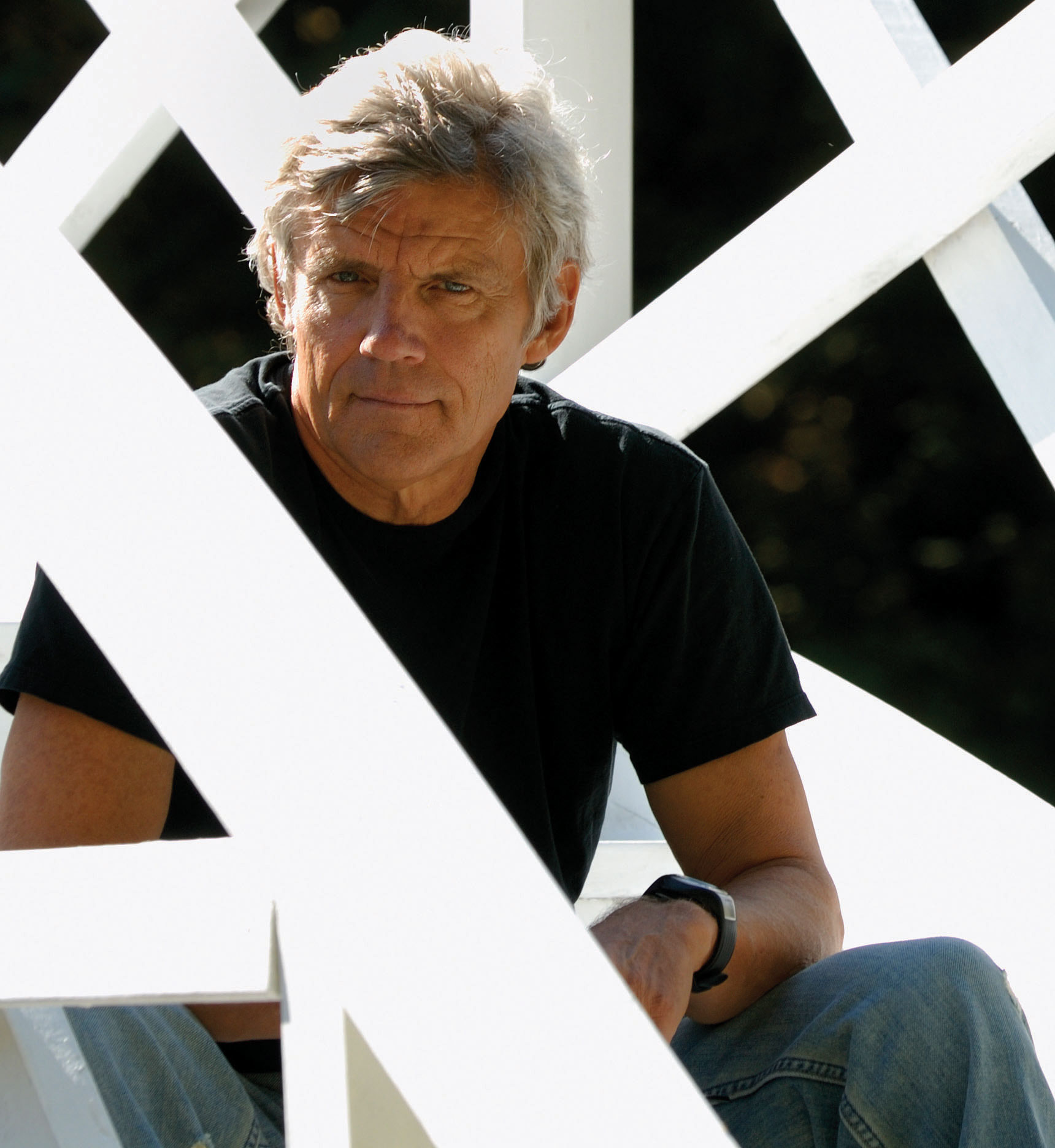
- Thompson, 2015
- Born: November 6, 1949 (age 76); Bellows Falls, Vermont, U.S.
- Occupations: Writer, actor, director

Ernest Thompson (born Richard Ernest Thompson; November 6, 1949) is an American writer, actor, and director. He won an Academy Award for Best Adapted Screenplay for On Golden Pond, an adaptation of his own play of the same name.

== Early life ==
Thompson was born as Richard Ernest Thompson in Bellows Falls, Vermont, to parents Theron and Esther Thompson. He spent his early years in Massachusetts, New Hampshire, and Maine, moving to Maryland as a junior high school student. He attended the University of Maryland and the Catholic University of America, before ultimately graduating cum laude from American University in 1971.

== Career ==
Thompson is best known as the author of the play On Golden Pond, which he wrote at the age of 28. The play opened off-Broadway in 1978, starring Tom Aldredge and Frances Sternhagen. A great success at the Kennedy Center, it opened at the New Apollo Theater on Broadway February 28, 1979. Revived the following season at the Century Theatre, On Golden Pond ran for more than 400 performances. It became a hit 1981 film, starring Katharine Hepburn and Henry Fonda. Thompson won the Academy Award for Best Adapted Screenplay in 1981 as well as awards from the Golden Globes and the Writers Guild of America.

The West Side Waltz, Thompson's second popular play, opened on Broadway, starring Katharine Hepburn on November 19, 1981. Thompson is quoted as saying that The West Side Waltz came about after a telephone call he received on behalf of screenwriter George Seaton, creator of movies such as Miracle on 34th Street, offering Thompson "the only George Seaton grant" to write a new play for the Ahmanson Theatre in Los Angeles. Thompson wrote and directed a television version based on the play, premiering on Thanksgiving night 1995, starring Shirley MacLaine, Liza Minnelli, Kathy Bates, and Jennifer Grey.

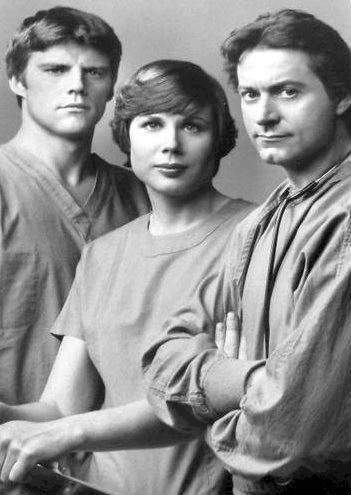
Thompson (left) on Westside Medical in 1977

As an actor, Thompson's only Broadway appearance was as drifter Hal Carter in Summer Brave, William Inge's revised version of his play Picnic. He portrayed Ranger Matt Harper on NBC's 1974 series Sierra and Dr. Phil Parker on ABC's Westside Medical. He appeared on the NBC soap opera Somerset as Tony Cooper, son of Rex and Laura Cooper, and in the television films The Rimers of Eldritch and F. Scott Fitzgerald and The Last of the Belles. Other acting credits include roles in the Bob Fosse movie Star 80 and Next Stop Wonderland, directed by Brad Anderson.

Thompson wrote the screenplay for the feature film Sweet Hearts Dance, directed by Robert Greenwald and starring Susan Sarandon and Don Johnson. He directed 1969, starring Kiefer Sutherland, Robert Downey, Jr., and Winona Ryder.

During the 1990s, Thompson wrote the television film Take Me Home Again (released on DVD as The Lies Boys Tell) in 1994, based on the novel by Lamar Herrin, starring Kirk Douglas and Craig T. Nelson, in which Thompson also appeared. He directed and acted opposite Shirley MacLaine and Jennifer Grey in The West Side Waltz and co-wrote and directed the Emmy-nominated movie Out of Time, starring James McDaniel and Mel Harris.

In 2000, Thompson directed The Penis Responds, with Richard Gilliland, as a "lighthearted" answer to The Vagina Monologues. In 2001, he directed his own live TV version of On Golden Pond, starring Julie Andrews and Christopher Plummer. His play White People Christmas played at the Zephyr Theatre in Los Angeles, directed by Thompson.

== Personal life ==
In 1991 his son August was born. In 1993, Thompson married Kristie Lanier at his home in New Hampshire, where he raised daughters Heather and Danielle. Thompson and Lanier later divorced. On Christmas Day in 2012, he married Kerrin (Rocha) Adrian.

Thompson lives most of the year in New Hampshire (very close to where On Golden Pond was filmed). In 2008, Thompson co-founded Whitebridge Farm Productions with partners Morgan Murphy and Lori Gigliotti-Murphy. He wrote, directed and starred in the company's first two movies, Heavenly Angle and Time and Charges, both of which were primarily filmed in the Granite State and offered by Whitebridge Farm Productions.
