= If the shoe fits =

If the shoe fits is an idiomatic expression in English; the full form is "if the shoe fits, wear it". The phrase is used metaphorically and has often been used as a title.

"If the shoe fits" may refer to:

== Literature ==
- If the Shoe Fits, a 2002 book by Gary Soto
- If the Shoe Fits, a 2000 book by Jaye Carroll, a pseudonym of Michael Carroll

== Music ==
- If the Shoe Fits, a 1976 album by American country rock band Pure Prairie League
- If the Shoe Fits, a 1992 album by Norman Foote
- If the Shoe Fits, a 1979 album by Ronnie Dyson
- "If the Shoe Fits", a song by Brendan Shine
- "If the Shoe Fits", a 1979 song by Hank Williams III from the album Risin' Outlaw
- "If the Shoe Fits", a 2006 song by Jihad Jerry & the Evildoers
- "If the Shoe Fits", a song by Leon Russell from the 1972 album Carney
- "If the Shoe Fits", a song by Waylon Jennings from the 1967 album Love of the Common People

== Television ==
- "If the Shoe Fits", an episode of Adventures of the Black Stallion
- If the Shoe Fits (Alfred Hitchcock Presents), an episode of Alfred Hitchcock Presents
- "If the Shoe Fits", an episode of Angela Anaconda
- "If the Shoe Fits", an episode of Barney & Friends
- "If the Shoe Fits", an episode of Littlest Pet Shop
- "If the Shoe Fits", an episode of Murder, She Wrote
- "If the Shoe Fits", an episode of Notes from the Underbelly
- "If the Shoe Fits...", an episode of The Jamie Foxx Show
- "If the Shoe Fits", an episode of Xena: Warrior Princess
- "A Hard Day's Fight/If the Shoe Fits", an episode of Atomic Betty
- "The If the Shoe Fits Issue", an episode of Our Hero
- If the Shoe Fits (film) (1990), a modern take on the Cinderella story set

== See also ==
- Shoe size, an alphanumerical indication of the fitting size of a shoe for a person
