= Summer Brave =

Play written by William Inge

- Original Playbill cover
- Original language: English
- Written by: William Inge
- Genre: Comedy-drama
- Setting: Independence, Kansas

Premiere
- Date: October 26, 1975
- Place: ANTA Playhouse

Summer Brave is a play by William Inge, a revision of his Pulitzer Prize-winning 1953 play Picnic. Set in Independence, Kansas, a small town in Kansas in the early 1950s, it focuses on Hal Carter, an attractive young stranger who drifts into town just before the annual Labor Day celebration and sets off a chain of events that prompts various residents to reflect on the present and contemplate an unpromising future.

== Writing ==
Of it, Inge said, "A couple of years after Picnic had closed on Broadway, after the film version had made its success, I got the early version out of my files and began to rework it, just for my own satisfaction. Summer Brave is the result. I admit that I prefer it to the version of the play that was produced [originally], but I don't necessarily expect others to agree...I feel that it is more humorously true than Picnic, and it does fulfill my original intentions."

== Production ==
The Broadway production was staged two years after Inge's death. Produced by Fritz Holt and directed by Michael Montel, it was not a success. After three previews, it opened on October 26, 1975 at the ANTA Playhouse and closed after 18 performances. Ernest Thompson, who later won fame as the writer of On Golden Pond, starred as Hal Carter. The supporting cast included Nan Martin, Alexis Smith, Jill Eikenberry, Miles Chapin, and Peter Weller.

First published in 1962, the first performance of Summer Brave came only after Inge's death in 1973. However, he wrote the original version of Summer Brave long before Picnic. In other words, Picnic was revised from Summer Brave, not the other way around. In fact, a manuscript copy of the play Summer Brave held in Special Collections at the University of Kansas library has an inscription by Inge on the title page. There Inge refers to it as an early version of Picnic, and one that he much preferred to Picnic. The ending of Summer Brave is the main substantive difference between it and Picnic, with Madge staying rather than running after Hal. The ending for Picnic was suggested by Josh Logan, the director. Although Picnic is set in the early 1950s, both plays are about growing up in Independence, Kansas in the 1920s, as all the allusions in the texts show, and most of the characters are based upon people who lived in Independence when Inge was a boy. In addition, sections of Summer Brave reflect biographical events that Inge's family felt were too personal to make public. Hence, one page from the KU library's copy of the Summer Brave manuscript was intentionally removed (possibly by Inge's sister), leaving a gap of information in an important conversation that does not exist at all in the published version of the play. Inge always wanted to retain aspects of Summer Brave in Picnic. Hence, the first publications of Picnic all have differences. Taken together, all three plays—the early Summer Brave, Picnic, and the published Summer Brave—represent at least 25 years of a writer's efforts to express things even he may have felt too painful to reveal.
