= Criminal justice (disambiguation) =

Criminal justice is the delivery of justice to those who have committed crimes.

Criminal justice may also refer to:

- Criminal Justice (film), a 1990 American drama film
- Criminal Justice (British TV series), a 2008 British television drama series
- Criminal Justice (Indian TV series), an Indian Hindi-language crime thriller legal drama web series
  - Criminal Justice: Adhura Sach
  - Criminal Justice: Behind Closed Doors
