= The West Side Waltz =

The West Side Waltz is a play by Ernest Thompson.

The play focuses on Margaret Mary Elderdice, an aging, widowed pianist living in a dreary Upper West Side apartment, and her relationships with a prim, virginal violinist neighbor and the young companion who moves in for an extended stay. Thompson was prompted to write the piece when screenwriter George Seaton offered him a grant to write a new play following the success of his previous work, On Golden Pond.

The play originally was presented off-Broadway in 1978. After three previews, the Broadway production, directed by Noel William, opened on November 19, 1981, at the Ethel Barrymore Theatre. Despite the presence of screen legend Katharine Hepburn, supported by Dorothy Loudon, Regina Baff, and David Margulies, it ran for only 126 performances. Hepburn was nominated for a Tony Award for Best Actress in a Play, but lost to Zoe Caldwell (Medea). The production then went on tour, running at the Shubert Theatre (Boston) from April 13 to May 1, 1982.

Thompson wrote the teleplay for and directed a CBS production that originally aired on Thanksgiving night in 1995. The cast included Shirley MacLaine, Liza Minnelli, Kathy Bates, Jennifer Grey, Estelle Harris, and Robert Pastorelli.
