= Just Getting Started (2017 film) =

- Theatrical release poster
- Directed by: Ron Shelton
- Written by: Ron Shelton
- Produced by: Bill Gerber; Steve Richards
- Starring: Morgan Freeman; Tommy Lee Jones; Rene Russo; Joe Pantoliano; Glenne Headly; Sheryl Lee Ralph; Elizabeth Ashley; George Wallace; Graham Beckel; Jane Seymour; Johnny Mathis
- Cinematography: Barry Peterson
- Edited by: Paul Seydor
- Music by: Alex Wurman
- Production companies: Entertainment One; Gerber Pictures
- Distributed by: Broad Green Pictures
- Release date: December 8, 2017
- Running time: 91 minutes
- Country: United States
- Language: English
- Budget: $22 million
- Box office: $7.6 million

Just Getting Started is a 2017 American action comedy film directed and written by Ron Shelton, his first feature film since Hollywood Homicide (2003). The film stars Morgan Freeman, Tommy Lee Jones, Rene Russo, Elizabeth Ashley and Glenne Headly. The plot follows an ex-FBI agent who must put aside his personal feud with a former mob lawyer at a retirement home when the mafia comes to kill the pair. It was released in the United States on December 8, 2017, by Broad Green Pictures, was panned by critics and was a box office bomb, grossing just $7 million against its $22 million budget.

== Plot ==
A New Jersey woman becomes livid when she sees an ad for the luxury resort-style senior living Villa Capri in Palm Springs, California, and she sees photos of William Dupree in it. Calling her son, she tells him where the man who put his dad in prison is, asking for his head for this year's Christmas gift.

Defense lawyer 'Duke Diver', who once defended the heads of the world's most dangerous criminal organizations, now manages Vila Capri. Leo, a former FBI agent, immediately makes himself known when he arrives at the resort, taking Duke's reserved parking spot.

Surprisingly having paid in cash in full, Duke has Leo invited to that night's poker match. Arriving at his villa blonde Margarite invites herself over. As he goes to straighten up his bedroom, he finds Roberta in lingerie. As he's escorting Margarite home, she reminds him it's poker night. Rushing back to excuse himself to Roberta, he then gets to poker.

Leo repeatedly beats Duke at every competition, starting with poker. Duke is initially threatened by the newcomer's activities with the ladies, taking his three to dinner and reciting poetry.

Duke challenges Leo to 18 holes of golf, and during the match a rattlesnake hidden in his golf bag essentially ends the match. We later are privy to a call between the New Jersey woman scolding her would-be hitman for using a snake.

At the villa, dressed as Santa as always, Duke has a skirmish with a corporate Santa, and Leo comes to his aid. Afterwards at the bar, the two see Suzie and a very drunk Duke hits on Suzie. She shoots him down and Leo takes him home.

The following morning, the regional director of the resort chain turns out to be Suzie Quinces, the same woman they first spotted after poker, the one impressed by Leo's reciting poetry and that Leo had hit on. Her job is to evaluate the resort's management of expenses. She's shown different activities offered, including tango, tai chi and sex workshops.

On the grounds Suzie comes across Leo, who's landscape painting. Duke comes up, perturbed and while they are talking, a coyote starts to carry off her dog Romeo. Leo grazes it with a bullet so it drops it, and he whisks Romeo and Suzie off to the vet.

On their return, Leo proposes a series of competitions to Duke including chess, ping pong, weightlifting, throwing cards into a hat and limbo, which Leo loses because of his back.

At the Christmas party, Duke accompanies Johnny Mathis on piano, his friend and Suzie's crush. When Leo asks her to dance, Duke gets mad and challenges him to a round of golf on Christmas Day.

During the competition, Duke's buddies plan on helping him win. However, Duke's custom golf cart explodes and causes him to run. He realizes the mafia has found him and is attempting to kill him. Duke and Leo must work together to defeat the mafia and save Duke's life.

Looking at security camera footage, 'Willie' William Dupree aka Duke recognises Oscar Bruno, son of the mafioso he put away. Tracking him down to a motel, they sleep through their stakeout. The next morning, while snooping around a strip club, their rental van blows up and they are lured into the desert. Oscar offers to trade Duke for Suzie, but they overpower him.

Finally, Leo and Suzie take over Villa Capri, and Duke is relocated, now manager of a Florida resort.

== Cast ==
- Morgan Freeman as Duke Diver
- Tommy Lee Jones as Leo McKay
- Rene Russo as Suzie Quinces
- Joe Pantoliano as Joey
- Glenne Headly as Margarite
- Sheryl Lee Ralph as Roberta
- Elizabeth Ashley as Lily
- George Wallace as Larry
- Graham Beckel as Burt
- Mel Raido as Oscar
- Jane Seymour as Delilah
- Johnny Mathis as himself
- Kristen Rakes as Ginger
- Nick Peine as Jimmy

== Production ==
On May 14, 2016, it was announced that Broad Green Pictures would co-produce the film under the title Villa Capri with Entertainment One, with direction by Ron Shelton, starring Morgan Freeman and Tommy Lee Jones. On June 9, 2016, it was announced that Rene Russo was cast in a leading role alongside Freeman and Jones. Filming began in New Mexico on August 15, 2016. In September 2017, the film was retitled from Villa Capri to Just Getting Started.

== Reception ==
=== Box office ===
In the United States and Canada, Just Getting Started was released on December 8, 2017, alongside the wide expansion of The Disaster Artist, and was projected to gross around $5 million from 2,146 theaters in opening weekend. It ended up debuting to $3.2 million, finishing 10th at the box office. When adjusting for inflation, it was the 21st worst opening of all time. In its second weekend the film dropped 69% to $978,923, finishing 14th. In its third week the film made $22,092 from 48 theaters, dropping 98%.

=== Critical response ===
On Rotten Tomatoes the film holds an approval rating of 5% based on 22 reviews, with an average rating of 2.5/10. The website's critical consensus reads, "A thoroughly unfunny misfire, Just Getting Started manages the incredible feat of wasting more than a century of combined acting experience from its three talented leads." On Metacritic, the film holds a weighted average score of 21 out of 100, based on 10 critics, indicating "generally unfavorable" reviews. Audiences polled by CinemaScore gave the film an average grade of "C" on an A+ to F scale.

Joe Leydon of Variety panned the film: "Some bad movies trigger swells of anger and outrage, while others prompt industrial-grade snark and scorn. And then there are leaden clunkers like Just Getting Started that provoke an ineffable sense of sadness as one considers how much time, money and talent has been squandered on something so thoroughly useless." Stephen Farber of The Hollywood Reporter wrote: ""The film is ingratiating enough, but its main value is to make us eager for another, more substantial Shelton movie long before another decade has slipped by."

== See also ==
- List of Christmas films
