= The West Side Waltz (film) =

- Based on: The West Side Waltz by Ernest Thompson
- Screenplay by: Ernest Thompson
- Directed by: Ernest Thompson
- Starring: Shirley MacLaine; Liza Minnelli; Jennifer Grey; Kathy Bates; Robert Pastorelli
- Theme music composer: Patrick Williams
- Country of origin: United States
- Original language: English

Production
- Executive producers: Stephen Bedell; Lynn Danielson-Rosenthal; David A. Rosemont; Nicole Seguin; Robert M. Sertner; Frank von Zerneck
- Producer: Randy Sutter
- Cinematography: Steve Yaconelli
- Editor: Robert Florio
- Running time: 90 minutes
- Production companies: Allied Communications; CBS Entertainment Production; Von Zerneck Sertner Films

Original release
- Network: CBS
- Release: November 23, 1995

The West Side Waltz is a 1995 television film written and directed by Ernest Thompson and starring Shirley MacLaine, Liza Minnelli, Jennifer Grey and Kathy Bates. It is based on Thompson's play of the same name, which starred Katharine Hepburn and Dorothy Loudon on Broadway.

== Cast ==
- Shirley MacLaine as Margaret Mary Elderdice
- Liza Minnelli as Cara Varnum
- Jennifer Grey as Robin Ouiseau
- August Schellenberg as Serge
- Richard Gilliland as Neil
- Hal Williams as Jonno
- Ernest Thompson
- Camille Saviola
- Estelle Harris
- Tsai Chin
- Mary Pat Gleason
- Kathy Bates as Mr. Goo
- Robert Pastorelli as Sookie Cerullo
- George Alvarez as Construction Worker
- Richard Reicheg as Mr. Lipson
- Alfred C. Cerullo III as Roger
- Danny Woodburn as Mechanic
