= Mickey Katz =

American musician and comedian (1909–1985)

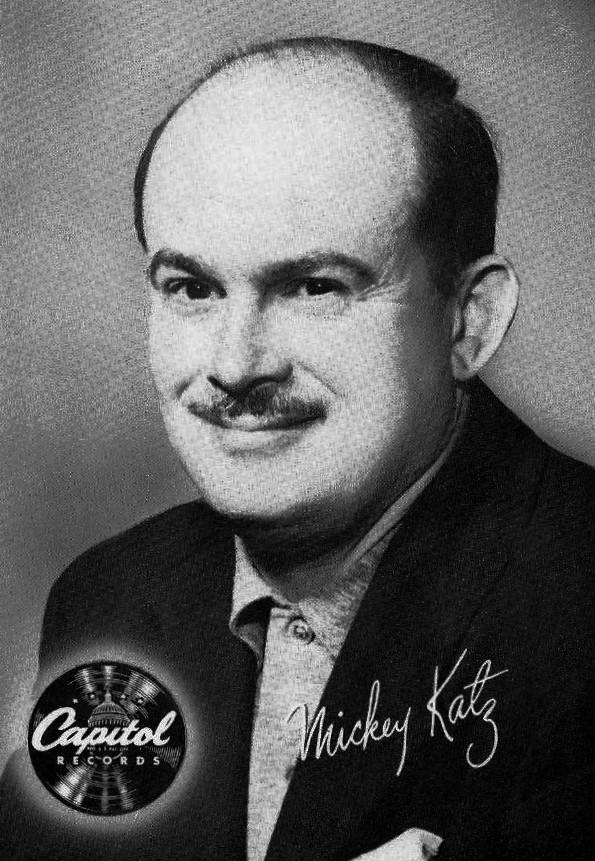
- Katz, circa 1950
- Born: Meyer Myron Katz; June 15, 1909; Cleveland, Ohio, U.S.
- Died: April 30, 1985 (aged 75); Los Angeles, California, U.S.
- Occupations: Musician; comedian
- Spouse: Grace Epstein (m. 1930)
- Children: Joel Grey; Ronald A. Katz
- Relatives: Jennifer Grey (granddaughter)

Meyer Myron "Mickey" Katz (June 15, 1909 – April 30, 1985) was an American musician and comedian. He was the father of actor Joel Grey, and paternal grandfather of actress Jennifer Grey, and Ronald Katz.

== Early life ==
Meyer Myron Katz was born on Sawtell Court in Cleveland, Ohio. He was one of five children born to Johanna (née Herzberg) and Menachem Katz. Mickey lost an older sister to diphtheria when he was about four years old. Menachem supported the family as a tailor, but money was always tight in the Katz family. As children, Mickey and his siblings contributed to the family finances by entering amateur musical contests in the neighborhood theaters and bringing the prize money home to their parents. Even after graduating from high school, Mickey continued to support his family with the money he earned from his music.

Out of high school, Katz was hired by Phil Spitalny to go on a road tour. While waiting at the train station to leave, Katz met Grace Epstein, his future wife. He was seventeen and she was fourteen. He married her three years later, in 1930. They had two sons, Joel Grey and Ronald. Each of Katz's sons had two children. Joel fathered Jennifer Grey and Jim Grey, and Ronald fathered Randy Katz and Todd Katz. In 1977, Katz told the story of his life in a biography called Papa, Play for Me.

== Career ==
=== Finding the clarinet ===
One evening when Katz was eleven, his father took him to a concert at the Talmud Torah. A clarinet solo was on the program. On the way home, Katz told him he wanted to play the clarinet. However, for his father to pay for an instrument and lessons were out of the question. The next day, Katz asked the bandmaster of the local high school for a school clarinet, and within a few days he received an old and dusty clarinet. The next step was to find a way to pay for clarinet lessons. Katz went to his uncle Sam and offered to clean his tailor shop if he would pay for the lessons. His uncle agreed, and soon Katz was studying under Joseph Narovec. He made excellent progress on the instrument, and quickly learned the saxophone as well.

=== Starting his career ===
Fresh out of high school, Katz landed a gig playing clarinet and sax for Phil Spitalny and went on a road tour with his band. After the tour, Katz played in Doc Whipple's big band at the Golden Pheasant Chinese Restaurant for about a year, at which point he left and joined Angelo Vitale's band at the Park Theater. Deciding to try his luck in New York City, Katz left Cleveland in 1929. He had a hard time finding work at first, and bopped around from one small, unsuccessful job to the next. He finally ran into Ed Fishman, whom he knew from Cleveland and who helped him find a job playing in Howard Phillips' orchestra at the Manger Hotel. However, the job ended in 1930, after his marriage, and the couple had no choice but to go to live in Grace's uncle's home.

Katz was soon saved from this situation when he received a phone call from Jack Spector, a friend back in Cleveland. A spot for a clarinet and sax player had recently opened up in Maurice Spitalny's band at the Loew's State Theater, and Spector had recommended Katz. Katz moved back to Cleveland with Grace and played with Spitalny until the leader left Loew's Theater in 1932. Katz continued to play there for another year, then rejoined Spitalny at the RKO Palace Theater and played there until the Cleveland musicians' local in Cleveland went on strike in 1935. Unfortunately for Katz, the union lost the strike, since movie theaters were becoming more common and theaters no longer needed live musicians, and he was out of a job once again.

Nevertheless, he soon found work playing for vacationers as they sailed around Lake Erie on the excursion boat Goodtime. This gig lasted every summer from 1935 to 1939. During the off-season, Katz found what work he could playing various one-night gigs. When the Goodtime went out of business in 1939, he moved on to a position as bandleader and MC at the Ohio Villa gambling palace.

=== Going to war ===
In 1942, Katz was hired as bandleader at the Alpine Village theater-restaurant in Cleveland. He was subsequently drafted, but was classified 4-F classification by the Selective Service System and released from his military obligation after failing his preinduction physical. He found other ways to help the war effort, though. Back at the Alpine Village he began to sell war bonds after the shows, bringing in US$25,000 to $30,000 a week for the U.S. government. He also played for servicemen at the USO canteen at Cleveland's St. John's Cathedral. Then, in 1945, he took his six-man comedy and band group (Mickey Katz and His Krazy Kittens) on a USO tour of Europe with movie star Betty Hutton. For this trip Katz was made a temporary officer; it was the closest he ever came to serving in the military.

=== Hitting his stride ===
In 1946, the national jukebox convention was to be held in Cleveland, and Katz was asked to conduct for it. While there he met Spike Jones, and a week later Jones asked Katz to join him in Hollywood. Katz played with Jones for more than a year, taking over the unique role of “glugger” from Carl Grayson (providing musical throat “glugs”). However, Katz tired of Jones’s relentless tour schedule, and left the band in 1947.

Katz soon decided to make an English-Yiddish comedy record. Having written the lyrics to "Haim afen Range" (based on "Home on the Range") some years previously, he had it approved by RCA. He quickly wrote another song for the flip side, "Yiddish Square Dance", and had his friend Al Sack sketch out the melody for it and set "Haim afen Range" to music as well. The original run of 10,000 copies released in New York City sold out in three days, and RCA received orders for 25,000 more. Katz then went on to parody "Tico, Tico" as "Tickle, Tickle" and backed this new record with "Chloya", a parody of "Chloe". He then hired a manager in Los Angeles, and in 1947 performed in Boyle Heights, a largely Jewish and Mexican-American neighborhood. In Katz's words, he was a "double-ethnic smash."

=== Receiving some opposition ===
Despite Katz's appeal with particular groups, there were many who did not like his music. Most of these people were affronted by the way he emphasized Jewish differences, convinced that his antics would help perpetuate Jewish stereotypes. In "The Yiddish are coming", writer Josh Kun sums up the atmosphere of the time with the following: "As historian Howard Sachar has noted, the prevailing attitude after World War II was a fear that anything that promoted a 'separate identity as Jews ... would somehow lend credence to Hitler's racial theories.'"

Although Katz had his fans, not everybody loved him. There were many radio stations that refused to play his records, and several venues feared hiring him. In his biography, Katz recalls asking a radio station manager why he wouldn't play any of Katz's records:

I asked him why he wouldn't play my records. He said, "Because some of our listeners are offended."
I asked, "Who, besides you?"
He said, "I don't think that's any of your business."
I answered, "I think it is my business because this is how I make a living. You play Italian records, you play Polish records--"
He cut me off. "I will not play any record with Yiddish in it. Yiddish is the language of the ghetto."
"My friend," I said, "Yiddish is the language of our forefathers."
"I do not care to hear it."
"Then why don't you play some of my instrumental records? They're some of the greatest music in the world, played by some of the greatest musicians in the world—Ziggy Elman, Mannie Klein, Nat Farber--"
Again he cut me off mid-sentence. "There will be no Yiddish spoken, or Jewish music played, on this station."

=== Continuing on ===
Not one to let others get him down, though, Katz continued to create parodies until 1957 and continued to perform off and on until his death. In 1948, Katz produced the English-Yiddish stage revue Borscht Capades, co-starring with his son Joel Grey. The show did well until it went to Broadway. Right before Borscht Capades opened, an almost identical show, called Bagels and Yocks opened up down the street. In competition with each other for such a small, particular audience, both shows ending up failing.

From 1951 to 1956, Katz operated as a disc jockey for the Los Angeles radio station KABC while going on occasional road tours and playing engagements at the Bandbox nightclub. In 1952 Katz also did some shows for the United Jewish Appeal. In the same year, he joined the California Friars Club, and proceeded to conduct at their major functions for the next 25 years. In 1953, Katz decided to play Las Vegas, and after a successful start at the Frontier, he returned to Las Vegas for four more years.

In 1955, Katz played a brief engagement at Harrah's Lake Tahoe. The following year, he played in Europe and Australia. In 1958, Katz finally played the Catskills, an area where most of his peers made their start. Unfortunately for Katz, the booking office that hired him was determined to make as much money out of him as possible, and he ended up with a packed schedule, playing "anything north of Atlantic City." In 1961, Katz went on a tour of South Africa, playing in cities including Cape Town, Johannesburg, Benoni, Durban, Port Elizabeth, Pretoria, and Muizenberg. Finally, at the end of his career, Katz began playing the Florida condominium circuit, often playing two shows a night.

== Musical style ==
Katz was largely a jazz musician. All of his parodies have a distinct klezmer flavor, either throughout the entire piece or as a brief "break" in the middle of the song. His songs often lampooned both Jewish and American culture.

== Various Katz appearances ==
Katz and his group can be seen in the movie Thoroughly Modern Millie accompanying Julie Andrews as she sings a Yiddish song at a Jewish wedding.

A number of famous Jewish musicians, including those with their own bands, recorded with him, including Mannie Klein, Ziggy Elman and Si Zentner.

Jazz musician Don Byron recorded a tribute to Mickey Katz in 1993, Don Byron Plays the Music of Mickey Katz.

The 2003 British movie Wondrous Oblivion featured Katz' "The Barber of Schlemiel" (a parody of The Barber of Seville) in a scene where the Jewish main character plays the record for his Jamaican neighbor.

Katz supplied the voice of the character Hop-a-Long Catskill on the Beany and Cecil cartoon series on ABC-TV in 1962. Catskill was a frog, and the role was a parody of the role of Chester on the television series Gunsmoke. His primary function, in the few episodes in which he appeared, was to serve bad coffee and provide even worse Yiddish/English puns.

== Music ==
In addition to his parodies, Katz created more traditional klezmer music. His songs have been compiled onto CDs, including Mish Mosh, The Most Mishige, Mickey Katz Greatest Shticks, and Simcha Time: Music for Weddings, Bar Mitzvahs, and Brisses. Katz played with many musicians throughout the years, but he initially performed his parodies with Mannie Klein on trumpet, Sammy Weiss on drums, Benny Gill on violin, Si Zentner on trombone, and Wally Wechsler on piano. Al Sack, the man who created the music for Katz's first two parodies, assembled these players for Katz and then helped him get Nat Farber to arrange the music.

== Death ==
Katz died of kidney failure in Los Angeles, California in 1985, at the age of 75.
