= George Alvarez =

Cuban-American actor

- Born: Cuba
- Occupation: Actor
- Years active: 1991-present
- Spouse: Liesa Alvarez (m. 2003)
- Children: 5

George Enrique Alvarez (born January 25) is a Cuban-American actor. He is best known for playing the roles of Det. Alex Garcia on General Hospital (1992 to 1994, 1995 to 1999) and Port Charles (1997 to 1999), Enrique Alvarez on The Bold and the Beautiful (1996 to 1997), and Father Ray Santos on Guiding Light (1999 to 2009).

== Early life ==
Alvarez was born in Cuba. His family emigrated to the United States in the late 1950s and he was raised in West New York, New Jersey. He graduated from Memorial High School. After high school, Alvarez enrolled at Parsons School of Design in Manhattan. He graduated with a Bachelor of Fine Arts degree, but he decided that he would rather pursue an artistic career than work at an advertising agency to make money.

== Career ==
After graduating from Parsons, Alvarez worked at Studio 54 in its original heyday. Through the connections he made there, he responded to a casting call for a film. He got the part, but the project, an early attempt to adapt the Anne Rice novel Interview with the Vampire, wasn't produced. Nonetheless, Alvarez realized that acting was what he wished to do, saying, "You get to pretend, get to be a kid again, and get paid well to do it."

After doing some theater work in New York, Alvarez moved to Los Angeles to audition for film and television roles. He also began to develop a passion for writing screenplays. In 1991, he made his television debut with a guest starring role on Beverly Hills, 90210. He then played Juan Campos in the NBC mini-series Drug Wars: The Cocaine Cartel. Alvarez was cast as Tommy in the 1992 film Class Act.

In 1992, Alvarez landed a two-day part on the ABC soap opera General Hospital, which led to a long term recurring role as Detective Alex Garcia. He guest starred on NYPD Blue in 1994 and appeared in the film Heavy (1995). Alvarez had a role in the miniseries Tom Clancy's Op Center. He played Miguel in Cagney & Lacey: Together Again. He also appeared in The West Side Waltz.

Alvarez was cast on the CBS soap opera The Bold and the Beautiful, playing the role of Enrique Alvarez from 1996 to 1997. He appeared in the TV movie Innocent Victims and guest starred on Pacific Blue. In 1997, he began playing his General Hospital character, Alex Garcia, on the show's spin off, Port Charles. In 1998, he was cast as Sly in the film Interlocked: Thrilled to Death (also titled A Bold Affair), co-starring with his The Bold and the Beautiful castmates Jeff Trachta and Schae Harrison.

In 1999, Alvarez began playing the recurring role of Father Ray Santos on the CBS soap opera Guiding Light. He replaced Jaime Passer in the role. Alvarez stayed on the show until the final episodes aired in September 2009.

Alvarez played Discipio in the 2005 miniseries Miracle's Boys.

== Personal life ==
Alvarez married his wife, Liesa, on August 2, 2003. They have five children.

== Filmography ==
=== Film ===
Year	Title	Role
1992	Class Act	Tommy
1995	Heavy	Orderly
1998	Interlocked: Thrilled to Death	Sly Also titled A Bold Affair

=== Television ===
Year	Title	Role	Notes
1991	Beverly Hills, 90210	Ramon	Episode: "Ashes to Ashes"
1992-1994; 1995–1999	General Hospital	Det. Alex Garcia	Recurring role
1992	Drug Wars: The Cocaine Cartel	Juan Campos	Television mini-series
1992	Santa Barbara	Jaime	Episode: "Episode #1.2012"
1994	NYPD Blue	Nando Cepeda	Episode: "Zeppo Marks Brothers"
1995	Tom Clancy's Op Center	Capt. Rodriguez	Television mini-series
1995	Cagney & Lacey: Together Again	Miguel	Television film
1995	The West Side Waltz	Construction Worker	Television film
1996	Innocent Victims	Deputy Archer	Television film
1996–1997	The Bold and the Beautiful	Enrique Alvarez	Recurring role
1997	Pacific Blue	Alejandro Cruz	Episode: "Rumplestiltskin"
1997–1999	Port Charles	Det. Alex Garcia	Recurring role
1999–2009	Guiding Light	Father Ray Santos	Recurring role
2005	Miracle's Boys	Discipio	Television mini-series 6 episodes
