= Glenne Headly =

American actress (1955–2017)

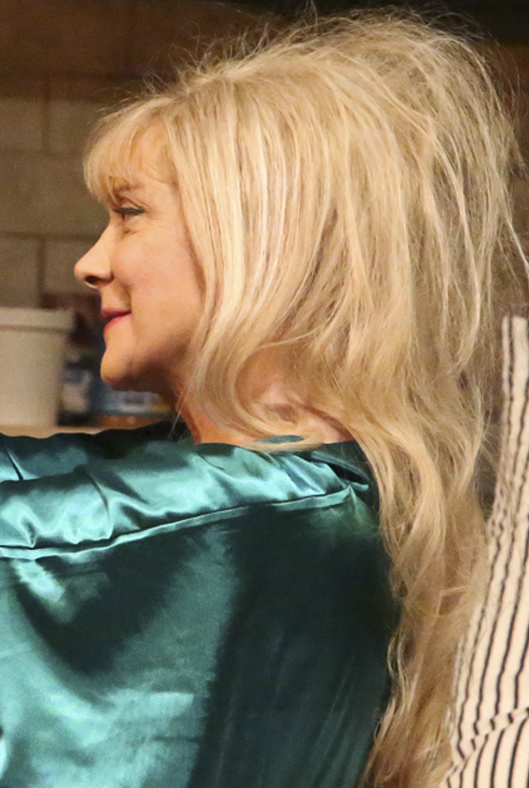
- Headly in 2016
- Born: Glenne Aimee Headly; March 13, 1955; New London, Connecticut, U.S.
- Died: June 8, 2017 (aged 62); Santa Monica, California, U.S.
- Occupation: Actress
- Years active: 1972–2017
- Spouses: John Malkovich (m. 1982; div. 1988); Byron McCulloch (m. 1993)
- Children: 1

Glenne Aimee Headly (March 13, 1955 – June 8, 2017) was an American actress. She was widely known for her roles in Dirty Rotten Scoundrels (1988), Dick Tracy (1990), and Mr. Holland's Opus (1995). Headly received a Theatre World Award and four Joseph Jefferson Awards and was nominated for two Primetime Emmy Awards.

In 2017, Headly appeared in two films, The Circle and Just Getting Started. The latter marked her final film role, released six months after her death. She also starred in Hulu's comedy series Future Man. She died on June 8, 2017, mid-way through filming the series.

== Early life and education ==
Headly was born on March 13, 1955, in New London, Connecticut. Her early years were spent living in the care of her mother, Joan Ida Headly (née Sniscak), in San Francisco, and her maternal grandmother in Lansford, Pennsylvania. Her father, Peter De Normandy Headly, was born on May 13, 1933 and died on August 21, 1969.

Early in her elementary school years, she joined her mother, who was then living in Greenwich Village. She studied ballet at the Robert Joffrey school of ballet and modern dance at the Martha Graham Studios. In New York, she attended public schools, including PS 41, where she was placed in a class for intellectually gifted children. There, a fifth-grade teacher introduced her to the work of Jacques Cousteau in an oceanography class, triggering a lifelong interest in preserving the natural world. She later went on to the High School of Performing Arts, majoring in drama and graduating with honors.

Rather than continuing to study the dramatic arts, she attended the American College of Switzerland, a small college in Leysin from which she graduated with a bachelor's degree. Soon after, she moved to New York, taking day jobs as a waitress so she could work nights in the theater for little or no salary. Later, she moved to Chicago, where she joined the New Works Ensemble at the St. Nicholas Theatre. She was eventually cast in a Goodman Theatre production of Curse of the Starving Class, directed by Robert Falls and co-starring John Malkovich.

== Film and television career ==
While appearing on the Chicago stage in Curse of the Starving Class, Headly was asked to join the Steppenwolf Theatre ensemble, which was looking to expand. She also appeared in several other productions. In Chicago, she was nominated for five Joseph Jefferson awards, and won three for best supporting actress. She received her Actors' Equity card when cast by Vivian Matalon in a summer theatre production of Charley's Aunt, and joined SAG when Arthur Penn wrote a breakout role for her in the film Four Friends.

On August 2, 1982, Headly married fellow ensemble member John Malkovich. Soon after, she replaced Ellen Barkin in Extremities off-Broadway. She was then cast in The Philanthropist, also off-Broadway, and won a Theatre World Award for best newcomer. In New York, she appeared in Balm in Gilead with her fellow Steppenwolf Theatre members, and in Arms and the Man, on Broadway, with Kevin Kline and Raul Julia.

Headly played several supporting roles in such films as Making Mr. Right, Paperhouse, Seize the Day and Nadine, but her role in Dirty Rotten Scoundrels (1988), with Steve Martin and Michael Caine, truly launched her film career. In 1988, Headly was named Most Promising New Actress by the Chicago Film Critics Association. That same year, Headly divorced Malkovich after he had an affair with Michelle Pfeiffer during the filming of Dangerous Liaisons.

In 1989, Headly played the role of Elmira Boot Johnson in the critically acclaimed TV miniseries Lonesome Dove, a part for which she received her first of two Emmy Awards nominations for best supporting actress in a television movie.

Headly was then cast by Warren Beatty to appear as Tess Trueheart in Dick Tracy. She next starred with Demi Moore and Bruce Willis in Mortal Thoughts, directed by Alan Rudolph. In 1992, she worked on a small Canadian film called Ordinary Magic, and on the first day of filming, met Byron McCulloch, whom she married in 1993. She also co-starred with Ted Danson and Macaulay Culkin in the 1994 comedy Getting Even with Dad.

Headly appeared in Mr. Holland's Opus, Sgt. Bilko, What's the Worst That Could Happen?, Breakfast of Champions, Around the Bend, 2 Days in the Valley, and others.

Headly appeared in the television movies Winchell, And the Band Played On, Pronto, My Own Country, and Women vs. Men. Headly received her second of two Emmy Awards nominations for best supporting actress in a television movie for Bastard Out of Carolina (1996). She appeared as Julie Andrews and Christopher Plummer's daughter in the 2001 live telecast of the play On Golden Pond for CBS. She was cast in the series Encore! Encore!, starring Nathan Lane and Joan Plowright, from 1998 to 1999, and had recurring roles as Dr. Abby Keaton on ER from 1996 to 1997 and as Leland Stottlemeyer's wife, Karen, on Monk.

In 2004, she played the mother of Lindsay Lohan's character in Confessions of a Teenage Drama Queen. She appeared in the films The Amateurs (2005), The Namesake (2006), Comeback Season (2006), Kit Kittredge: An American Girl (2008), The Joneses (2009), and Don Jon (2013). Headly appeared in the film Strange Weather (2016) and in the HBO limited series The Night Of (2016). In 2017, she played Marguerite opposite Morgan Freeman in Just Getting Started.

Headly and Ed Begley Jr. were cast in lead roles with Josh Hutcherson in Future Man, Hulu's half-hour comedy television series produced by Seth Rogen and Evan Goldberg. Headly died on June 8, 2017, during filming of the series. At the time of her death, she had filmed five episodes of the planned 13-episode season order. Producers stated that she would not be recast and that the episodes she filmed will air, leaving the writers to rework the episodes in which she was due to appear.

== Theater ==
Headly was an ensemble member of the Steppenwolf Theatre Company from 1979 until 2005, although she never returned to Chicago to do a play after the late 1980s, believing that such a move would uproot and be disruptive to her family. She took a break from the stage altogether for 10 years until 1999, when she starred with Miranda Richardson in Wallace Shawn's Aunt Dan and Lemon, which premiered at the Almeida Theatre in London.

In 1983, Headly appeared in Christopher Hampton's The Philanthropist at the Manhattan Theater Club in New York. In 1984, Headly appeared in Lanford Wilson's Balm in Gilead presented by the Circle Repertory Company and the Steppenwolf Theater Ensemble. In 1985, Headly starred as Raina in George Bernard Shaw's Arms and the Man alongside Kevin Kline, directed by John Malkovich, in New York. In 2000, Headly starred as Ellen in Detachments at the Tiffany Theater in Los Angeles, written and directed by Colleen Dodson-Baker.

In 2001, Headly starred as Angela Kennedy Lipsky in the premiere of My Brilliant Divorce at the Druid Theatre in Galway, Ireland. In 2003, Headly starred with David Hyde Pierce in The Guys as part of a revolving cast at the Actors' Gang in Los Angeles. In 2012, Headly played Eva White in the Geffen Playhouse's production of The Jacksonian, written by Beth Henley. In 2016, once again at the Geffen Playhouse, Headly starred in Sarah Ruhl's Stage Kiss.

== Death ==
Headly died of complications from a pulmonary embolism on June 8, 2017, at age 62, in Santa Monica, California.

== Filmography ==
=== Film ===
Year	Title	Role	Notes	Refs
1981	Four Friends	Lola		
1983	Doctor Detroit	Miss Debbylike		
1985	Fandango	Trelis		
1985	The Purple Rose of Cairo	Hooker	(Billed as Glenne Headley)	
1985	Eleni	Joan Gage		
1986	Seize the Day	Olive		
1987	Making Mr. Right	Trish		
1987	Nadine	Renée Lomax		
1988	Stars and Bars	Cora Gage		
1988	Dirty Rotten Scoundrels	Janet Colgate		
1989	Paperhouse	Kate Madden		
1990	Dick Tracy	Tess Trueheart		
1991	Mortal Thoughts	Joyce Urbanski		
1992	Grand Isle	Adele Ratignolle		
1993	Ordinary Magic	Charlotte		
1994	Getting Even with Dad	Theresa Walsh		
1995	Mr. Holland's Opus	Iris Holland		
1996	Sgt. Bilko	Rita Robbins		
1996	2 Days in the Valley	Susan Parish		
1998	The X-Files	Bartender	Uncredited	
1998	Babe: Pig in the City	Zootie	Voice	
1999	Breakfast of Champions	Francine Pefko		
2000	Timecode	Dava Adair		
2001	Bartleby	Vivian		
2001	What's the Worst That Could Happen?	Gloria Sidell		
2004	Confessions of a Teenage Drama Queen	Karen		
2004	Eulogy	Samantha		
2004	Around the Bend	Katrina		
2005	The Amateurs	Helen Tatelbaum		
2006	Comeback Season	Deborah Pearce		
2006	The Namesake	Lydia		
2006	Raising Flagg	Anne Marie Purdy		
2008	Kit Kittredge: An American Girl	Louise Howard		
2009	The Joneses	Summer Symonds		
2013	Don Jon	Angela Martello		
2015	Dial a Prayer	Mary		
2015	Merry Xmas	Sarah	Short film	
2016	Strange Weather	Mary Lou Healy		
2017	The Circle	Bonnie Holland		
2017	Just Getting Started	Margarite	Posthumous release	
2018	Making Babies	Bird	Posthumous release	

=== Television ===
Year	Title	Role	Notes	Refs
1987	Santabear's High Flying Adventure	Various voices	Television film	
1989	Lonesome Dove	Elmira Boot Johnson	4 episodes	
1993	Hotel Room	Darlene	Episode: "Tricks"	
1993	And the Band Played On	Mary Guinan	Television film	
1995	Frasier	Gretchen	Voice; episode: "An Affair to Forget"	
1996	Bastard Out of Carolina	Aunt Ruth	Television film	
1996–1997	ER	Abby Keaton	Recurring role, 9 episodes	
1997	Pronto	Joyce Patton	Television film	
1998	My Own Country	Vickie Talley	Television film	
1998	Winchell	Dallas Wayne	Television film	
1998	Recess	Miss Salamone	voice; 1 episode	
1998–1999	Encore! Encore!	Francesca Pinoni	Main role, 12 episodes	
2000	The Sandy Bottom Orchestra	Ingrid Green	Television film	
2001	The Fugitive	Renee Charnquist	Episode: "New Orleans Saints"	
2001	A Girl Thing	Helen McCormack	Television film	
2001	On Golden Pond	Chelsea Thayer Wayne	Television film	
2002	Rugrats	Dr. Cathy	Voice; 1 episode	
2002	Women vs. Men	Brita	Television film	
2002	Lloyd in Space	MIDGE (Military Intelligence Data Gathering Equipment)	Voice; episode: "Gimme Some Skin	
2003–2006	Monk	Karen Stottlemeyer	4 episodes	
2004	The Guardian	Anne Joplin	Episode: "Beautiful Blue Mystic"	
2005	Law & Order: Special Victims Unit	Attorney Simone Bryce	Episode: "Intoxicated"	
2008	Grey's Anatomy	Elizabeth Archer	Episode: "Lay Your Hands on Me"	
2008	CSI: Crime Scene Investigation	Viviana Conway	Episode: "The Happy Place"	
2012	Psych	Grace Larsen	Episode: "Autopsy Turvy"	
2012	Pound Puppies	Miss Petunia	Voice; episode: "Pound Preemies"	
2012	Parks and Recreation	Julia Wyatt	Episode: "Ben's Parents"	
2013	The League	Gloria	Episode: "The Von Nowzick Wedding"	
2016	The Night Of	Alison Crowe	3 episodes	
2017	Future Man	Diane Futturman	5 episodes; Posthumous release	
