= Joe Lisi =

American actor

- Born: September 9, 1950 (age 75); New York City, New York, U.S.
- Other name: Joe Lissi
- Occupations: Actor, retired police captain
- Years active: 1983–present

Joe Lisi (born September 9, 1950), also credited as Joe Lissi, is an American actor. He appeared in the NBC television show Third Watch as NYPD Lieutenant Swersky from 2000 to 2005. He also appeared on the NBC television show Law & Order: Special Victims Unit as Craig Lennon, a parole officer and briefly appeared in the 1995 comedy/crime film The Jerky Boys: The Movie as a construction worker.

== Life and career ==
Lisi was born and raised in New York City, New York. His father was Sicilian (from Giarre, Sicily) and his mother was of Irish descent. He spent 24 years in the New York Police Department (NYPD), retiring with the rank of captain. While already employed by the police department (1969), Joe Lisi enlisted in the United States Marine Corps Reserve. He was honorably discharged as a corporal.

Lisi took his first acting lesson at age 29 and made his Broadway debut (Take Me Out, 2003 Tony Winner, Best Play) at age 52. He studied theatre at HB Studio in New York City.

He is best known for his television roles as Dick Barone in The Sopranos and as Lt. Swersky on Third Watch.

== Selected filmography ==
- Out of the Darkness (1985) as Patrolman
- The Equalizer (1986) as Patrolman, in "Unnatural Causes"
- Forever Lulu (1987) as Cop
- White Hot (1988) as Broker 1
- Family Business (1989) as Desk Sergeant
- True Blue (1989-1990) as Captain Motta
- Come See the Paradise (1990) as Detective
- Criminal Justice (1990) as Detective Lane
- Traces of Red (1992) as Lieutenant J.C. Hooks
- Who's the Man? (1993) as Captain Reilly
- Quiz Show (1994) as Reporter
- Safe Passage (1994) as Dog Owner
- The Jerky Boys: The Movie (1995) as Construction Foreman
- Kiss of Death (1995) as Agent At Bungalow
- Trees Lounge (1996) as Harry
- Marvin's Room (1996) as Bruno
- His and Hers (1997) as Captain Barillo
- Happiness (1998) as Police Detective
- New York Undercover (1998) as Chief of Detectives
- The Adventures of Sebastian Cole (1998) as Concrete Guy
- Summer of Sam (1999) as Tony 'Olives'
- For Love of the Game (1999) as Pete
- The Sopranos (1999-2000) as Dick Barone
- Third Watch (1999-2005) as NYPD Lieutenant Robert "Bob" Swersky
- The Yards (2000) as Elliott Gorwitz
- 15 Minutes (2001) as Police Captain
- Ash Wednesday (2002) as Charlie, The Wiseguy
- ER (2002) as NYPD Lieutenant Bob Swersky
- Taxi (2004) - Mr. Anthony Scalia
- Law & Order: Special Victims Unit (2005-2009) as Parole Officer Craig Lennon
- The Company (2007) as Sam Giancana
- Synecdoche, New York (2008) as Maurice
- The Sorcerer's Apprentice (2010) as Police Captain
- Man on a Ledge (2012) as Desk Sergeant
- Day of the Fight (2023) as Tony

=== Video Games ===
Year	Title	Role
2008	Grand Theft Auto IV	The Crowd of Liberty City
2009	Grand Theft Auto: The Ballad of Gay Tony	The People of Liberty City
