= Ronald A. Katz =

American inventor (1936–2025)

- Born: Ronald A. Katz; March 10, 1936
- Died: March 28, 2025 (aged 89)
- Occupation: Inventor
- Father: Mickey Katz
- Relatives: Joel Grey (brother); Jennifer Grey (niece)

Ronald A. Katz (March 10, 1936 – March 28, 2025) was an American inventor and president of Ronald A. Katz Technology Licensing LP. His inventions were primarily in the field of automated call center technology. Katz developed a portfolio of more than 50 US patents covering his innovations. His inventions were related to toll free numbers, automated attendant, automated call distribution, voice response unit, computer telephone integration and speech recognition. As a philanthropist and Ronald Reagan UCLA Medical Center board member, Ronald Katz helped launch UCLA Operation Mend. He was the son of musician and comedian Mickey Katz, the brother of Academy Award-winning actor Joel Grey, and uncle to actress and Dirty Dancing star Jennifer Grey.

== Inventor and businessman ==
Katz was born on March 10, 1936. In 1961, Katz co-founded Telecredit, Inc. with Robert Goldman. This was the first company to "enable merchants to verify consumer checks over the phone using an automated system without the assistance of a live operator". In 1988, Mr. Katz formed a partnership with American Express Company to provide call processing services. That partnership later became First Data Corporation.

Katz also founded Ronald A. Katz Technology Licensing, L.P. (RAKTL). RAKTL's primary purpose is to license the Katz patent portfolio to companies using automated call centers. Over 150 companies have taken a license to the patents. RAKTL has thus earned approximately a billion dollars in license fees, including by suing accused infringers who refuse to take a license.

Katz also founded Telebuyer, LLC, a privately held company that commercializes inventions he made relating to electronic commerce and network-based monitoring systems. In the early 1990s, Katz developed a computer-controlled video system for monitoring remote locations, and an advanced scheduling and routing system for telephone and video communications. Katz leveraged his knowledge and work in these areas to create an electronic commerce system to help businesses reach customers in remote locations.

Katz died on March 28, 2025, at the age of 89.

== His patents ==
=== Characteristics ===
The written description of the invention in Katz's patents usually runs 20 to 40 pages, but the claims run into hundreds of pages. Katz denied that his strategy is to overly amend and complicate his patents.

=== Reexamination ===
In 2004, the Director of the United States Patent and Trademark Office ordered four of the Katz patents to be reexamined. The Director determined that a "substantial new question of patentability" had been raised. Since then, certain members of the public have also filed requests for reexamination of ten more Katz patents. These requests were based on said members of the public submitting new prior art that could raise "substantial new question of patentability" as to the validity of the patents. In three of the cases, the patent office disagreed and felt that the new prior art was not sufficiently strong to warrant a reexamination. In the other seven cases, the patent office agreed and ordered reexaminations. All reexaminations were still ongoing as of January 2007.

=== Partial list ===
- U.S. patent 5,128,984
- U.S. patent 5,561,707
- U.S. patent 5,684,863
- U.S. patent 5,815,551
- U.S. patent 5,828,734
- U.S. patent 5,917,893
- U.S. patent 5,898,762
- U.S. patent 5,974,120

=== List of patents undergoing reexamination ===
- U.S. patent 5,251,252
- U.S. patent 5,255,309
- U.S. patent 5,259,023
- U.S. patent 5,351,285
- U.S. patent 5,561,707
- U.S. patent 5,684,863
- U.S. patent 5,787,156
- U.S. patent 5,828,734
- U.S. patent 6,434,223

=== Partial list of Katz licensees ===
- AT&T
- Bank of America
- Citibank
- Delta Air Lines
- Hewlett-Packard
- Home Shopping Network
- IBM
- Microsoft
- Sears, Roebuck and Company
- Wachovia
- Wells Fargo
- TD Ameritrade
- Equifax Canada

== See also ==
- Call center
- Interactive voice response
- Patent troll
- Reexamination
