= Jennifer Grey =

American actress (born 1960)

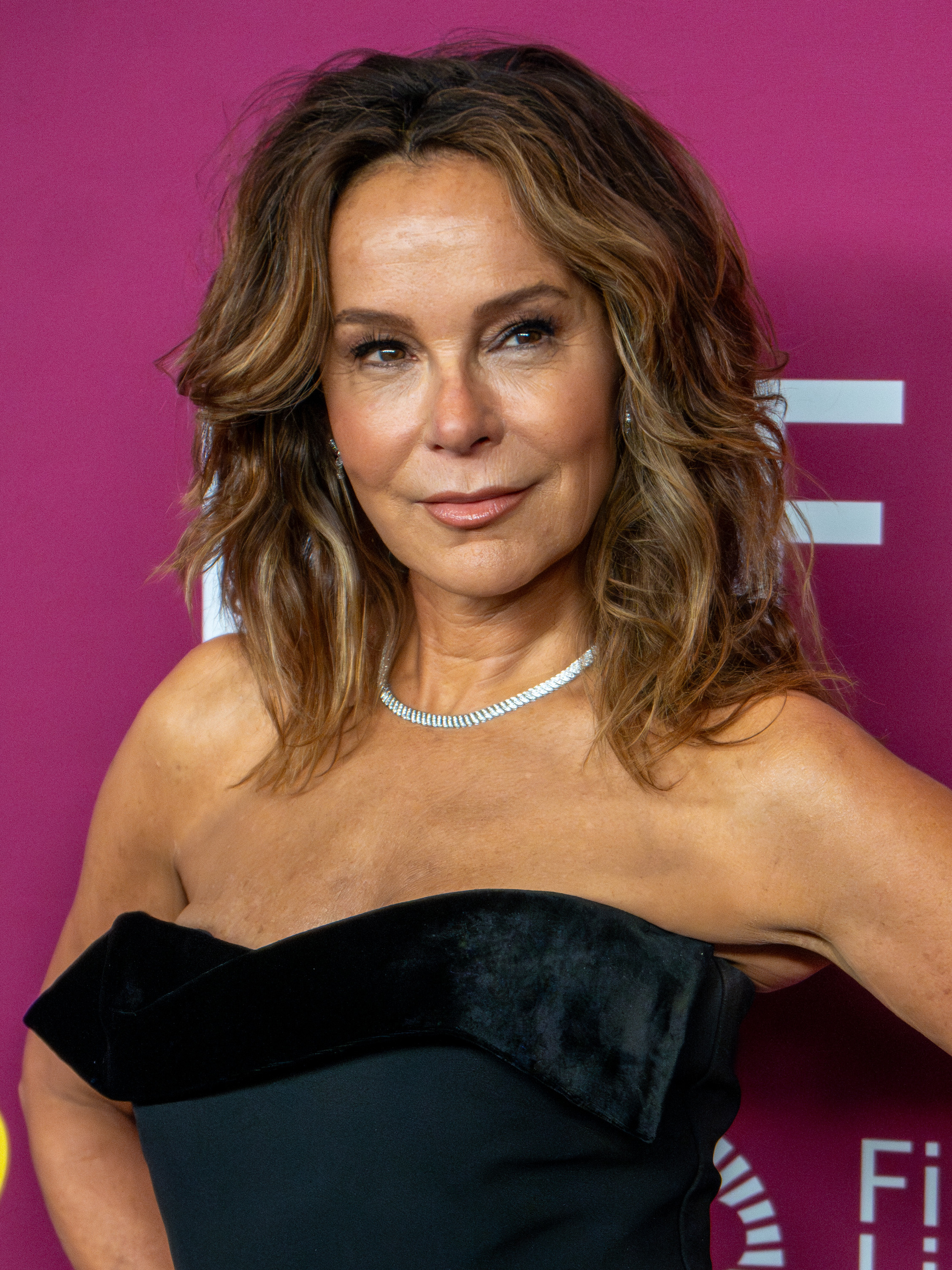
- Grey at the 2024 New York Film Festival
- Born: March 26, 1960 (age 66); New York City, New York, U.S.
- Occupation: Actress
- Years active: 1979–present
- Spouse: Clark Gregg (m. 2001; div. 2021)
- Children: 1
- Parents: Joel Grey (father); Jo Wilder (mother)
- Relatives: Mickey Katz (grandfather); Ronald A. Katz (uncle)

Jennifer Grey (born March 26, 1960) is an American actress. She made her acting debut with the film Reckless (1984), and had her breakthrough with the teen comedy film Ferris Bueller's Day Off (1986). She earned worldwide fame starring as Frances "Baby" Houseman in the romantic drama film Dirty Dancing (1987), which earned her a Golden Globe Award nomination. Her other feature films include Red Dawn (1984), The Cotton Club (1984), Bloodhounds of Broadway (1989), Bounce (2000), Redbelt (2008), The Wind Rises (2013), In Your Eyes (2014), Bittersweet Symphony (2019), and A Real Pain (2024).

Grey's early television work includes the made-for-TV films Murder in Mississippi (1990), Criminal Justice (1990), and If the Shoe Fits as Kelly Carter / Prudence (1990). She starred as herself in the series It's Like, You Know... (1999–2001), won season eleven of the dancing competition series Dancing with the Stars (2010) and starred as Judy Meyers in the Amazon Prime Video comedy Red Oaks (2014–2017). Her voice work in film and television includes the 2018 film Duck Duck Goose and the 2008–2014 animated television series Phineas and Ferb.

== Early life and education ==
Jennifer Grey was born on March 26, 1960, in New York City to former actress/singer Jo Wilder (née Brower) (died 2026) and stage and Academy Award-winning screen actor Joel Grey. Her paternal grandfather was comedian and musician Mickey Katz. Grey's parents both came from Jewish families.

Grey attended the Dalton School, a private school in Manhattan where she studied dance and acting, and where she met her best friend, actress Tracy Pollan, who went on to marry Michael J. Fox. After graduating in 1978, Grey enrolled at Manhattan's Neighborhood Playhouse School of the Theatre for two years of training as an actress. While waiting for roles, she supported herself waitressing.

== Career ==
=== Early career ===
Grey made her commercial debut at age 19 in an ad for Dr Pepper, then made her film debut in a small role in Reckless (1984), followed by another small role, in Francis Ford Coppola's The Cotton Club in 1984. That year she starred in the war film Red Dawn, then went on to the 1985 John Badham project American Flyers.

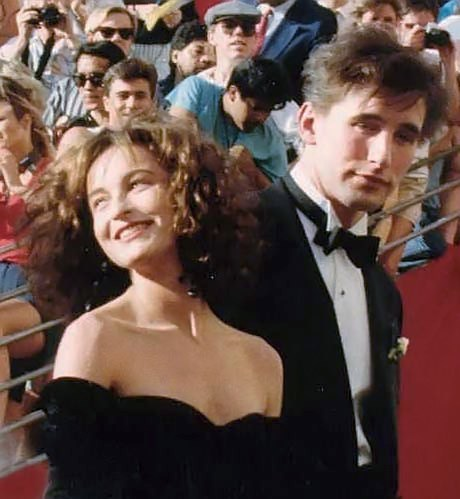
Grey with William Baldwin at the 1988 Academy Awards

=== Breakthrough and commercial success ===
In 1986 she played the role of jealous sister Jeannie Bueller in the John Hughes comedy film Ferris Bueller's Day Off, opposite Matthew Broderick. The film was commercially successful and received a positive critical reception.

The following year she reunited with Patrick Swayze, her Red Dawn co-star, to play Frances "Baby" Houseman in Dirty Dancing, a coming of age love story: spending the summer at a Catskills resort with her family, Frances "Baby" Houseman falls in love with the resort's dance instructor, Johnny Castle. The low-budget film was a surprise hit, and the first film to sell one million copies on video, and is considered a classic. She was paid $50,000 for her role, which came to define her career, and she was nominated for a Golden Globe for Best Actress for the role.

Grey's sole Broadway theatre credit is her 1993 appearance in The Twilight of the Golds.

Despite the success of Dirty Dancing, Grey felt that her looks would place restrictions on the type of future roles she would be considered for. After consulting her mother and three plastic surgeons in the early 1990s, she underwent two rhinoplasty procedures. The second was necessary to correct an irregularity caused by the first operation and ended up being more extensive than Grey had expected. This resulted in a nose that caused even close friends to fail to recognize her, and the major change in her appearance affected her career. Of the experience, she said, "I went in the operating room a celebrity—and came out anonymous. It was like being in a witness protection program or being invisible." Grey recalled in a 2020 interview that an airline employee who checked her identity refused to believe that she and the actress the employee knew from Dirty Dancing were one and the same. Grey briefly considered changing her name to start her career anew, but ultimately decided against this.

=== Later career ===
From March 1999 until January 2000, at age 39, Grey starred as herself in the short-lived ABC sitcom It's Like, You Know..., which satirized her much-publicized nose job as a running gag.

Grey appeared with Shirley MacLaine, Liza Minnelli, and Kathy Bates in the CBS television movie The West Side Waltz, adapted by Ernest Thompson from his play. She appeared in one episode of Friends as Mindy, a high school friend of Jennifer Aniston's character Rachel. She had a small role in the 2000 film Bounce with Gwyneth Paltrow and Ben Affleck. In 2007, Grey portrayed Daphne on the HBO series John from Cincinnati. In 2010, she played Abbey, the mother of a sick child in the season seven House episode "Unplanned Parenthood".

Grey was a contestant on season eleven of Dancing With the Stars. She was partnered with professional dancer Derek Hough. She came out very strong at first, frequently topping the leaderboard. However, injuries, stress, and exhaustion took their toll on Grey, and for a couple of weeks, she fell behind. In week seven, however, she improved, tying with previous frontrunner Brandy Norwood. On November 23, 2010, Grey and her partner Hough won the competition, making her the oldest female winner in the competition to date at age 50.

In September 2011 Grey appeared in the Lifetime movie Bling Ring as Iris Garvey, the mother of Zack Garvey. On November 5 and 6, 2011, Grey stood in for head judge Len Goodman on the BBC One TV show Strictly Come Dancing.

Grey voiced Mrs. Kurokawa in the English dub version of Hayao Miyazaki's film The Wind Rises.

From 2014 to 2017, Grey portrayed Judy Meyers on Red Oaks. In 2018, Grey co-starred in the film Untogether; the film was released on February 8, 2019.

Grey also appeared at the 2015 Tony Awards alongside her father Joel, presenting a performance from the musical Fun Home.

Ballantine Books published Grey's memoir, Out of the Corner, on May 3, 2022.

== Personal life ==
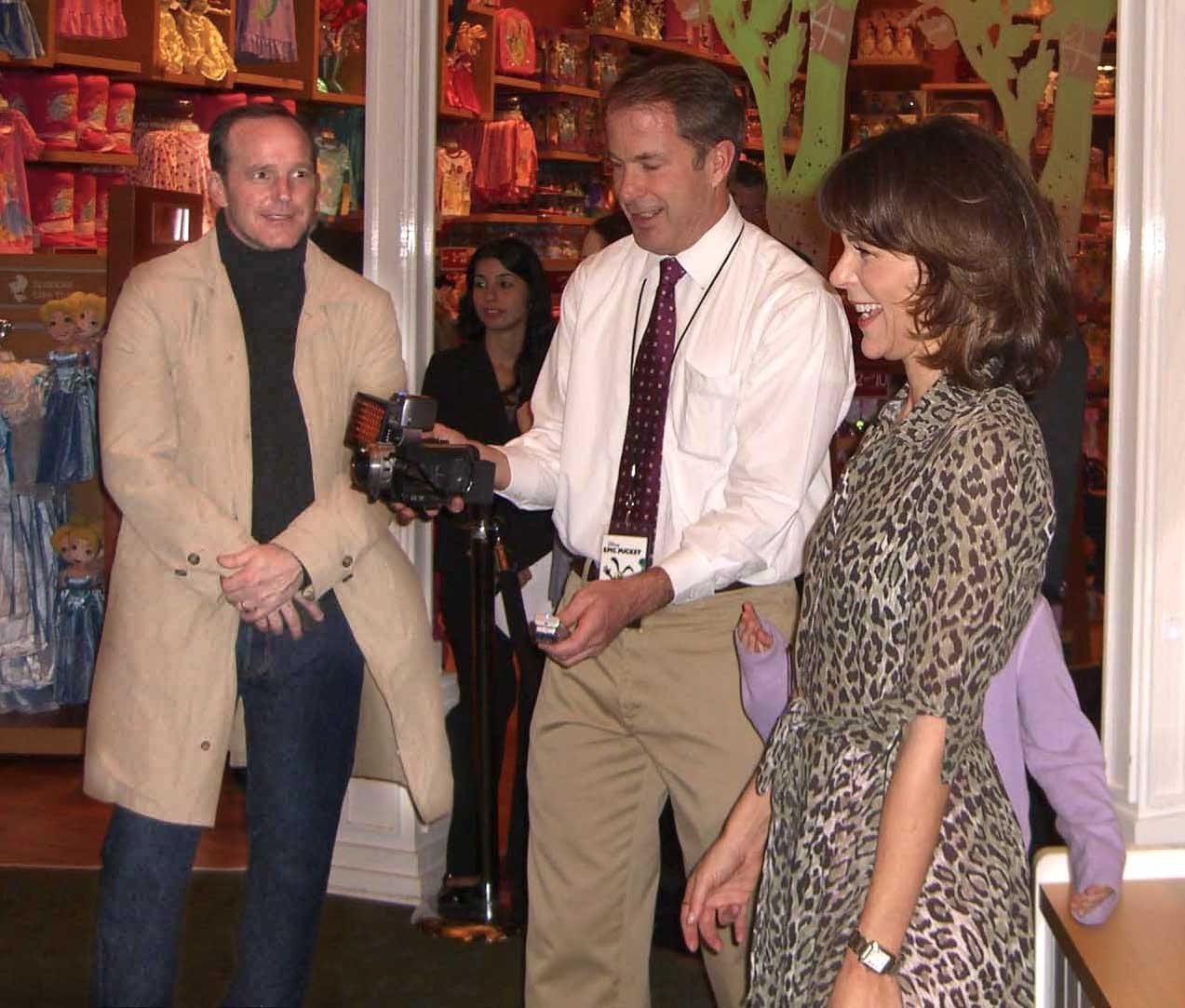
Grey with her then-husband, actor Clark Gregg (far left) at the November 30, 2010, Epic Mickey launch party

On August 5, 1987, Grey suffered severe whiplash in a car collision in Tempo, Northern Ireland, while vacationing with actor Matthew Broderick. They had quietly become a couple while filming Ferris Bueller's Day Off. The crash-- which publicized their relationship-- occurred when Broderick, driving a BMW, crossed into the wrong lane and collided head-on with a Volvo driven by a mother and daughter: Margaret Doherty, 63, and Anna Gallagher, 28. The mother and daughter were killed instantly. Broderick was convicted of careless driving and fined £100 ($175). Dirty Dancing was released a few weeks after the collision, catapulting Grey to fame but she has said that her grief and survivor's guilt over the crash prevented her from enjoying the film's success and led her to withdraw from acting for some time.

Grey has had relationships with actors Michael J. Fox (who went on to marry her best friend, Tracy Pollan), Johnny Depp, and William Baldwin, and then-aide to President Clinton, George Stephanopoulos. She married actor/director Clark Gregg on July 21, 2001. They have a daughter. They lived in Venice, Los Angeles. The couple co-starred in the Lifetime movie The Road to Christmas in 2006. On July 3, 2020, Grey and Gregg announced they had separated amicably in January, and had filed for divorce. Their divorce was finalized on February 16, 2021.

According to a September 2015 Grey profile in Jewish Journal, Grey had recently reconnected with Judaism, saying, "I love being a Jew. I've gotten a lot more Jewish in the last five years because of my daughter's bat mitzvah, and I realized I really care about being a Jew."

Prior to her 2010 appearances on Dancing with the Stars, Grey had a physical exam to ensure that she was fit enough to compete. She also saw a doctor to address chronic neck problems caused by the car crash. Her spinal cord was compressed and required ACDF surgery. The surgeon discovered a cancerous nodule on her thyroid and removed it. She returned to work in early 2010.

In January 2017, Grey participated in the Los Angeles 2017 Women's March.

In January 2025, she lost her home in the 2025 Los Angeles wildfires.

Grey disclosed the death of her mother on July 7, 2026 on Instagram, who had died on July 4, a week after receiving a diagnosis of lung cancer.

== Filmography ==
=== Film ===
Year	Title	Role	Notes
1984	Reckless	Cathy Bennario	
1984	Red Dawn	Toni Mason	
1984	The Cotton Club	Patsy Dwyer	
1985	American Flyers	Leslie	
1986	Ferris Bueller's Day Off	Jeanie Bueller	
1987	Dirty Dancing	Frances "Baby" Houseman	
1988	Gandahar	Airelle	Voice; English dub
1989	Bloodhounds of Broadway	Lovey Lou	
1992	Wind	Kate Bass	
1995	Lover's Knot	Megan Forrester	
1995	Grampa's Babies	Dottie Kravetz	
1997	Red Meat	Candice	
2000	Bounce	Janice Guerrero	
2002	Ritual	Dr. Alice Dodgson	
2008	Redbelt	Lucy Weiss	
2008	Keith	Caroline	
2013	The Wind Rises	Mrs. Kurokawa	Voice; English dub
2014	In Your Eyes	Diane	
2018	Duck Duck Goose	Edna	Voice
2018	Untogether	Josie	
2019	Bittersweet Symphony	Eleanor Roberts	
2021	Grief Night Club	Dr. J	Short film
2023	Mortal Kombat Legends: Cage Match	Herself / Sareena	Voice; video
2024	A Real Pain	Marcia	
2025	Wish You Were Here	Mom	

=== Television ===
Jennifer Grey television credits
Year	Title	Role	Notes
1984	ABC Afterschool Special	Carol Schwartz	Episode: "The Great Love Experiment"
1985	ABC Afterschool Special	Laura Eller	Episode: "Cindy Eller: A Modern Fairy Tale"
1986	The Equalizer	Valerie Jacobs	Episode: "A Community of Civilized Men"
1990	Murder in Mississippi	Rita Schwerner	TV movie
1990	Criminal Justice	Liz Carter	TV movie
1990	If the Shoe Fits	Kelly Carter / Prudence	TV movie
1991	Eyes of a Witness	Christine Baxter	TV movie
1993	A Case for Murder	Kate Weldon	TV movie
1995	Friends	Mindy	Episode: "The One with the Evil Orthodontist"
1995	Fallen Angels	Ginger Allen	Episode: "A Dime a Dance"
1995	The West Side Waltz	Robin Ouiseau	TV movie
1996	Portraits of a Killer	Elaine Taylor	TV movie
1997	The Player	Stephanie Granatelli	TV movie
1998	Outrage	Sally Casey	TV movie
1998	Since You've Been Gone	Patty Reed	TV movie
1999–2000	It's Like, You Know...	Herself	26 episodes
2006	The Road to Christmas	Claire Jamieson	TV movie
2007	John from Cincinnati	Daphne, Meyer's Fiancée	3 episodes
2008–2014	Phineas and Ferb	Various	Voice; 8 episodes
2009	The New Adventures of Old Christine	Tracey	Episode: "Love Means Never Having to Say You're Crazy"
2010	House	Abbey	Episode: "Unplanned Parenthood"
2010	Dancing with the Stars	Herself / Contestant	Season 11 Winner
2011	The Bling Ring	Iris Garvey	TV movie
2011	Strictly Come Dancing	Herself / Guest Judge	Series 9, Week 6
2014–2017	Red Oaks	Judy Meyers / Judy Rosen	21 episodes
2016	Lip Sync Battle	Herself	Episode: "Clark Gregg vs. Hayley Atwell"
2017	Who Do You Think You Are?	Herself	Episode: "Jennifer Grey"
2019	Grey's Anatomy	Carol Dickinson	3 episodes
2020	The Conners	Janelle	2 episodes
2022	Dollface	Sharon Wiley	Episode: "Homecoming Queen"
2023	Gwen Shamblin: Starving for Salvation	Gwen Shamblin	TV movie
2024	American Dad!	Herself	Voice; episode: "An Adult Woman"

== Dancing with the Stars performances ==
Week #	Dance / Song	Judges' score			Result
Week #	Dance / Song	Inaba	Goodman	Tonioli	Result
1	Viennese waltz / "These Arms of Mine"	7	8		Safe
2	Jive / "Shake It"	8	8		Safe
3	Samba / "A Little Respect"	8	8		Safe
4	Argentine tango / "La cumparsita"	9; 10	9; 9	9; 10	Safe
5	Foxtrot / "Love and Marriage"	8		9	Safe
6	Pasodoble / "So What"; Rock and roll Dance Marathon / "La Grange"	7 Awarded	7; 9	7 points	Last to be called safe
7	Tango / "Shut Up"; Team Cha-cha-cha / "Bust A Move"	9; 9			Safe
8	Quickstep / "Let's Face the Music and Dance"; Rumba / "Waiting for a Girl Like You"	9; 10			Safe
9 Semi-finals	Cha-cha-cha / "Mercy"; Waltz / "Way Over Yonder"	10; 10			Safe
10; Finals	Pasodoble / "Habanera"; Freestyle / "Do You Love Me (Now That I Can Dance)"; Viennese waltz / "These Arms of Mine"; Instant Cha-cha-cha / "Raise Your Glass"	10; 10; 10; 9		10; 10; 10; 10	Won

== Book ==
- Grey, Jennifer (May 3, 2022). Out of the Corner: A Memoir. Ballantine Books. ISBN 978-0-593-35670-8.

== Awards and nominations ==
Year	Award	Category	Work	Result
1988	Golden Globe Award	Best Actress – Motion Picture Comedy or Musical	Dirty Dancing	Nominated

== Notes ==
a: Contrary to previous versions of this article, and some of the sources cited in it, Grey indicated in a February 8, 2012 tweet on her verified Twitter account that she does not have a middle name.

Awards and achievements
Preceded by Nicole Scherzinger & Derek Hough	Dancing with the Stars (US) winners Season 11 (Fall 2010 with Derek Hough)	Succeeded by Hines Ward and Kym Herjavec
