= The Road to Christmas =

- DVD cover
- Genre: Comedy, drama
- Written by: Judd Parkin
- Directed by: Mark Jean
- Starring: Jennifer Grey; Megan Park; Clark Gregg
- Theme music composer: John McCarthy
- Country of origin: United States
- Original language: English

Production
- Producer: Tracey Boulton
- Cinematography: Malcolm Cross
- Editor: Stephen Lawrence
- Running time: 88 minutes
- Production company: Lifetime Television

Original release
- Network: Lifetime
- Release: December 17, 2006

The Road to Christmas is a 2006 American made-for-television romantic comedy film directed by Mark Jean and starring Jennifer Grey, Megan Park, and Clark Gregg. Written by Judd Parkin, The Road to Christmas first aired on December 17, 2006, on Lifetime. It was released on DVD on October 26, 2010, by A&E Home Video.

== Plot ==
A successful fashion photographer has planned a Christmas wedding in Aspen, however it is interrupted by a snow storm. With no flights or rental cars available, she accepts a ride from a widowed school teacher and his 13-year-old daughter, who open up their home to her until the roads clear.

== Cast ==
- Jennifer Grey as Claire Jameson
- Megan Park as Hilly Pullman
- Clark Gregg as Tom Pullman
- Barbara Gordon as Rheduel Pullman
- Jean Michel Paré as Lorenzo
- Thom Allison as Michele
- Marvin Ishmael as Jitu
- Pat Thornton as Tiny
- Kelly Fiddick as Cootie
- Lorne Cardinal as Chaba
- Ingrid Hart as N'naa
- Naomi Snieckus as Rose
- Michelle Moffat as Airport Clerk
- Jessica Booker as Enid
- Tantoo Cardinal as Sioux Woman

== Reception ==
DVD Talk called it "yet another in the seemingly endless variations on It Happened One Night (with a little Remember the Night thrown in, to boot)"

== See also ==
- List of Christmas films
