= Picnic (play) =

Play written by William Inge

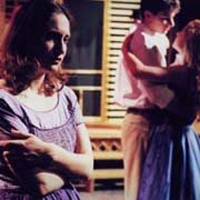
- 2001 Picnic production at Jacksonville University: Millie in foreground; Madge and Hal in background
- Original language: English
- Written by: William Inge
- Characters: Hal Carter; Madge Owens; Alan Seymour; Millie Owens; Flo Owens; Helen Potts
- Genre: Drama
- Setting: A small town in Kansas

Premiere
- Date: February 19, 1953
- Place: Music Box Theatre; New York City, New York

Picnic is a 1953 play by William Inge. The play premiered at the Music Box Theatre, Broadway, on 19 February 1953 in a Theatre Guild production, directed by Joshua Logan, which ran for 477 performances.

The original cast featured Ralph Meeker, Eileen Heckart, Arthur O'Connell, Janice Rule, Reta Shaw, Kim Stanley and Paul Newman. Inge won the 1953 Pulitzer Prize for Drama for the work, and Logan received a Tony Award for Best Director. The play also won the New York Drama Critics' Circle Award for Best Play of the season.

Picnic was Paul Newman's Broadway debut. An unknown at the time, Newman campaigned heavily for the leading role of Hal, but director Joshua Logan did not think Newman was physically large enough to convey the lead character's athletic attributes. As a result, Ralph Meeker was given the role of Hal opposite Janice Rule as Madge. Newman played Hal's former college roommate Alan Seymour while understudying the role of Hal. Newman eventually took over the lead role.

== Summary ==
It is Labor Day, and everyone is preparing for a neighborhood picnic. Hal Carter, a drifter, arrives in town looking for work and visits his college friend Alan, who is dating Madge Owens with the intent to marry her. Hal does odd jobs for the welcoming Helen Potts. Her neighbor, Flo Owens, distrusts Hal, especially around her daughters, Madge and Millie. Since shy Millie does not have a date, neighbor Mrs. Potts suggests that Hal accompany her, much to the chagrin of Flo. Hal agrees, but he is much more interested in Madge. There is an undeniable attraction between the two, as much as they try to fight it. While getting ready for the picnic, the family and friends dance in Flo's backyard to music playing nearby. Hal grows on both Millie and Madge, and they both vie for his attention. Rosemary, an "old maid schoolteacher" who boards at the Owens house, notices, disapproves, and is attracted to the shirtless Hal as she waits for her Labor Day date, local shop proprietor Howard Bevans. As Madge and Hal dance passionately, and a drunken Rosemary later butts in so she can dance with Hal (and proceeds to rip his shirt when Howard pries her away from Hal), Millie gets sick from drinking too much whiskey while no one is paying attention. Rosemary blames Millie's drinking on her date with Hal, and says he'll never rise beyond the gutter, and Flo joins in criticizing him.

Hal sits in the shadows by himself while everyone leaves for the picnic. Rosemary and her boyfriend Howard decide to skip the picnic and go for a drive. Madge stays behind to change her dress. When she comes back outside and tries to console Hal, they kiss after a deep and revealing conversation. They run off together and spend the night in the car.

Howard brings Rosemary back to the house. As he leaves, Rosemary begs him to marry her. When Madge and Hal return, Madge is ashamed of what they did. Hal asks for one more kiss, and their “passion is revived”.

In the morning, Flo is frantic because she has seen Madge crying hysterically. Rosemary leaves with Howard to get married, and everyone goes to the street to see her off. When Madge is left alone in the backyard, Hal shows up to talk to her. He has spent the night in hiding after Alan falsely reported to the police that Hal stole his car, in order to drive him out of town for "stealing" Madge. The others come back into the yard, and Hal leaves after defending himself when Alan arrives to drive him away, but only after telling Madge that he loves her and asks her to leave with him, despite Flo's presence and disapproval. Madge finally realizes that she loves him after he's gone, and she enters the house crying. Alan leaves, and it is obviously over between him and Madge. A little while later, Madge comes out of the house with a suitcase and tells her mother that she's going after Hal. The play ends with Flo watching her daughter leave.

== Cast and characters ==
Characters	Broadway debut (1953)	Broadway revival (1994)	2nd Broadway revival (2013)
Hal Carter	Ralph Meeker	Kyle Chandler	Sebastian Stan
Madge Owens	Janice Rule	Ashley Judd	Maggie Grace
Howard Bevans	Arthur O'Connell	Larry Bryggman	Reed Birney
Rosemary Sydney	Eileen Heckart	Debra Monk	Elizabeth Marvel
Flo Owens	Peggy Conklin	Polly Holliday	Mare Winningham
Mrs. Helen Potts	Ruth McDevitt	Anne Pitoniak	Ellen Burstyn
Millie Owens	Kim Stanley	Angela Goethals	Madeleine Martin
Alan Seymour	Paul Newman	Tate Donovan	Ben Rappaport
Christine Schoenwalder	Elizabeth Wilson	Charlotte Maier	Cassie Beck
Irma Kronkite	Reta Shaw	Audrie Neenan	Maddie Corman
Mrs. Potts' Mother			Lizbeth MacKay
Bomber Gutzel	Morris Miller	William Aaron Harpold	Chris Perfetti

Characters

- Helen Potts – Flo's neighbor
- Hal Carter – Hired by Helen, an old college friend of Alan
- Millie Owens – Younger daughter of Flo
- Bomber – Neighborhood kid
- Madge Owens – Elder daughter of Flo
- Flo Owens – Madge and Millie's mother
- Rosemary Sydney – Schoolteacher renting a room in Flo's house
- Alan Seymour – Madge's boyfriend, an old college friend of Hal
- Irma Kronkite – Schoolteacher, a friend of Rosemary
- Christine Schoenwalder – Schoolteacher, a friend of Rosemary
- Howard Bevans – Rosemary's boyfriend

== Staging ==
The setting for Picnic was argued over by Inge and director Joshua Logan, so the play is typically presented with the original scenery of the two back porches. This allows for little to no set changes and is a bit ironic in the fact that the play is called Picnic, but there are no picnic scenes. The houses are typically shown as a bit rundown and as naturalistic as possible.

In this play, there are several instances where the characters reference piano and band music playing down the street. All are in act two's dancing scene, in which different characters dance together, get to know each other better, and some major conflict begins. Millie mentions the music when it is present in the play, and it seems to have some importance to her. She is a lover of art and changing the world, which can be done with music. Millie explains that the music is coming from a band named Ernie Higgins and his Happiness Boys. The name suggests happiness and brings with it a sense of freedom.

== Production history ==
Picnic opened on Broadway at The Music Box Theatre in New York City on February 19, 1953. It was produced by The Theatre Guild and directed by Joshua Logan. The play's original cast included Ralph Meeker as Hal, Janice Rule as Madge, Kim Stanley as Millie, Peggy Concklin as Flo, and Paul Newman as Alan. After that, the play toured throughout 1954 and 1955. In 1955, Picnic was produced in several different states, including Bucks County Playhouse in New Hope, Pennsylvania on May 30, the Pasadena Playhouse in Pasadena, California on July 28, and the Cape Playhouse in Dennis, Massachusetts in August. Picnic opened in England at the Belgrade Theatre in Coventry on April 14, 1958, with scenery and costumes designed by Barry Kay.

The first Broadway revival was produced by Roundabout Theatre Company in 1994, starring Kyle Chandler, Tate Donovan, and Ashley Judd.

The play was revived on Broadway in 2013 at the American Airlines Theatre, with Ellen Burstyn, Mare Winningham, Maggie Grace, Sebastian Stan, Reed Birney, and Elizabeth Marvel.

A 2017 off-Broadway revival was presented by Transport Group Thtr Co, featuring David T. Patterson as Hal, Emily Skinner as Rosemary, Michele Pawk as Flo and Heather MacRae as Mrs. Potts.

== Critical reception ==
Tom Jicha of the South Florida Sun Sentinel wrote in 2000 that, by then, the Picnic franchise no longer had a "racy" and critically acclaimed reputation and had shifted to being perceived as being not critically acclaimed and "tamer than an episode of Dawson's Creek".

According to Jicha, this meant that the TV movie produced by CBS airing that year, while not being "a washout" and "moderately entertaining couple of hours", had "a second-tier cast glad to take the work".

== Awards and nominations ==
=== Original Broadway production ===
Year	Award ceremony	Category	Nominee	Result	Ref.
1953	Tony Awards	Best Direction of a Play	Joshua Logan	Won	
1953	Tony Awards	Best Stage Technician	John Davis	Won	
1953	Pulitzer Prize for Drama		William Inge	Won	
1953	New York Drama Critics' Circle	Best American Play	William Inge	Won	
1953	Theater World Awards	Distinguished Performance	Paul Newman	Won	
1953	Theater World Awards	Distinguished Performance	Eileen Heckart	Won	

=== 1994 Broadway revival ===
Year	Award ceremony	Category	Nominee	Result	Ref.
1994	Tony Awards	Best Featured Actor in a Play	Larry Bryggman	Nominated	
1994	Tony Awards	Best Featured Actress in a Play	Debra Monk	Nominated	
1994	Tony Awards	Best Featured Actress in a Play	Anne Pitoniak	Nominated	

== Adaptations ==
Paul Osborne was chosen to turn Picnic into a musical in the 1960s. It was called Hot September, and instead of going to the Alvin Theatre on Broadway in October 1965, the musical premiered in Boston and closed within a few weeks. Another rewrite of Picnic, undertaken by Inge in the early 1970s, was titled Summer Brave. It opened at the Equity Library Theatre in New York in 1973, two months before Inge committed suicide. The play lasted 14 performances, and it was revived two years later at the ANTA Theatre for 18 performances.

Picnic was made into a 1955 film by Columbia Pictures. It was directed by Joshua Logan, and nominated for six Academy Awards, of which it won two. William Holden, Kim Novak, Rosalind Russell, and Arthur O'Connell were the prominent members of the cast.

There was also a television special titled Picnic – Broadway on Showtime that aired on November 10, 1986, and it featured Jennifer Jason Leigh, Gregory Harrison, Rue McClanahan, Dick Van Patten, Conchata Ferrell, Dana Hill, and Michael Learned. It was produced by Catalina Production Group, Ltd. Another TV film was made in 2000, with Gretchen Mol, Josh Brolin, Chad Morgan, Bonnie Bedelia, Mary Steenburgen.

The University of Kansas' operatic version of the play premiered April 8, 2008. Librettist and stage director Tim Ocel recalled "When Forrest Pierce knocked on my door during the fall of 2006 and said he’d like to compose something for KU Opera, I jumped at the chance. The voice/opera division was just beginning to consider what our contribution to the 50th Murphy Hall celebration would be. I thought maybe we should create something; William Inge is the playwright and dramatic storyteller of 1950s Kansas, so why not explore the possibility of turning one of his plays into an opera? We both agreed that Picnic was the play that lent itself best to an operatic treatment. The libretto formed over the next six months, and by June 2007 Forrest was composing. The opera is a domestic comedy of sorts. Inge calls the play "A Summer Romance." It's about everyday people...you and I...who have to figure out what it means to be alive and connected and useful in this world. It attempts to show the truth and the possibility of our everyday lives."

Inge's Picnic was used as the basis for an opera with the name, composed by Libby Larsen on a commission from the University of North Carolina at Greensboro's School of Music, Theatre and Dance. Larsen's Picnic premiered on Thursday, April 2, 2009 by UNCG, in Aycock Auditorium. At Home with Amy Sedaris season 3, Episode 3, titled "Outdoor Entertaining" is loosely based on this play. In The Golden Girls season 2, Episode 14, "The Actor", the women are cast in a similar play.
