= William Inge =

American playwright and novelist (1913–1973)

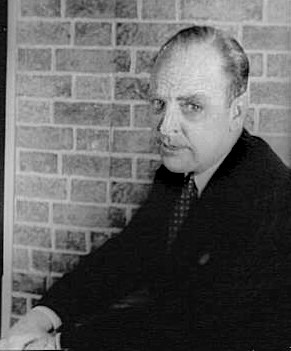
- Inge in 1954
- Born: William Motter Inge; May 3, 1913; Independence, Kansas, U.S.
- Died: June 10, 1973 (aged 60); Los Angeles, California, U.S.
- Education: Independence Community College; University of Kansas (BA); Vanderbilt University
- Occupations: Playwright, novelist
- Years active: 1947–1973

William Motter Inge (/ɪndʒ/; May 3, 1913 – June 10, 1973) was an American playwright and novelist, whose works typically feature solitary protagonists encumbered with strained sexual relations. With his portraits of small-town life and settings rooted in the American heartland, Inge became known as the "Playwright of the Midwest".

During the early 1950s, Inge had a string of memorable Broadway productions, including Picnic, which earned him a Pulitzer Prize for Drama. He was also nominated for the Tony Award for Best Play twice, for Bus Stop and The Dark at the Top of the Stairs. He also won an Academy Award for writing the screenplay to the film Splendor in the Grass (1961).

== Early years ==
Inge was born in Independence, Kansas, the fifth child of Maude Sarah Gibson-Inge and Luther Clay Inge. William attended Independence Community College and graduated from the University of Kansas in 1935 with a Bachelor of Arts degree in Speech and Drama. At the University of Kansas he was a member of the Nu chapter of Sigma Nu. Offered a scholarship to work on a Master of Arts degree, Inge moved to Nashville, Tennessee, to attend the George Peabody College for Teachers, but later dropped out.

Back in Kansas, he worked as a laborer on state highways and as a Wichita news announcer. From 1937 to 1938 he taught English and drama at Cherokee County Community High School in Columbus, Kansas. After returning and completing his Master's at Peabody in 1938, he taught at Stephens College in Columbia, Missouri, from 1938 to 1943.

== Career ==
Inge began as a drama critic at the St. Louis Star-Times in 1943. With Tennessee Williams's encouragement, Inge wrote his first play, Farther Off from Heaven (1947), which was staged at Margo Jones' Theatre '47 in Dallas, Texas. As a teacher at Washington University in St. Louis between 1946 and 1949, he wrote Come Back, Little Sheba. It ran on Broadway for 190 performances in 1950, winning Tony Awards for Shirley Booth and Sidney Blackmer. (The 1952 film adaptation won both an Oscar and a Golden Globe for Shirley Booth. Willy van Hemert directed a 1955 adaptation for Dutch television, and NBC aired another TV production in 1977.) During his time teaching at Washington University, Inge's struggles with alcoholism became more acute; in 1947, he joined Alcoholics Anonymous (AA). It was through AA that Inge met the wife of a member of his AA group whose name was Lola and, who through name as well as personal characteristics, was the person upon whom one of the lead characters in Come Back, Little Sheba, "Lola", was based. Even as Come Back, Little Sheba was in a pre-Broadway run in early 1950, Inge was filled with some doubt as to its success. He expressed in a letter to his sponsor in Alcoholics Anonymous, "If Sheba makes it in Hartford I guess it will go on to Broadway and if it doesn't I suppose I'll be back in St. Louis. If it does make it to Broadway, I don't know when I'll be back." Inge never had to return to St. Louis.

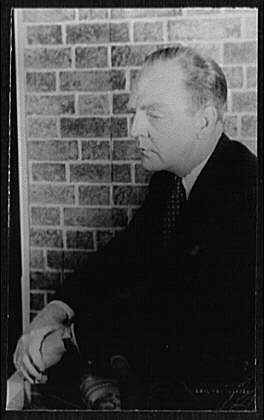
Portrait of William Inge by Carl Van Vechten, 1954

In 1953, Inge received a Pulitzer Prize for Picnic, a play based on women he had known as a small child:

When I was a boy in Kansas, my mother had a boarding house. There were three women school teachers living in the house. I was four years old, and they were nice to me. I liked them. I saw their attempts, and, even as a child, I sensed every woman's failure. I began to sense the sorrow and the emptiness in their lives, and it touched me.

Picnic had a successful Broadway run from February 19, 1953, to April 10, 1954. A film adaptation made in 1955 was directed by Joshua Logan and won two Academy Awards.

In 1953, Inge's short play Glory in the Flower was telecast on Omnibus with a cast of Hume Cronyn, Jessica Tandy, and James Dean.

In 1955, his play Bus Stop premiered. Inge's inspiration of boy-pursuing-girl came from a similar situation he'd seen on a bus trip to Kansas City. Nominated for four Tony Awards including Best Play, it was made into a 1956 film starring Marilyn Monroe.

In 1957 he wrote The Dark at the Top of the Stairs, an expansion of his earlier Farther Off from Heaven. The play was nominated for five Tony Awards, including Best Play, and was adapted as a film in 1960.

His 1959 play A Loss of Roses, with Carol Haney, Warren Beatty, and Betty Field, was filmed as The Stripper (1963), with Joanne Woodward, Richard Beymer, and Claire Trevor, and a popular Jerry Goldsmith score.

Natural Affection had the misfortune to open on Broadway during the 1962 New York City newspaper strike, which lasted from December 8, 1962, until April 1, 1963. Thus, few were aware of the play, and fewer bought tickets. It lasted only 36 performances, from January 31, 1963, to March 2, 1963. What theatergoers missed was a drama exploring themes of fragmented families and random violence. As with Truman Capote's In Cold Blood, the inspiration for Natural Affection came from a newspaper account of a seemingly meaningless and unmotivated murder. The play centers on a single mother, Chicago department store buyer Sue Barker (Kim Stanley). While troubled teen Donnie (Gregory Rozakis), Sue's illegitimate son, has been away at reform school, she has entered into a relationship with Cadillac salesman Bernie Slovenk (Harry Guardino). With Donnie's unexpected return to her Chicago apartment, conflicts escalate, and Donnie finds himself on an emotional precipice. The closing five minutes of the play introduces a new character, a young woman Donnie meets in the apartment hallway. He invites her into the apartment and, without warning, kills her as the curtains close. The Broadway production, directed by Tony Richardson, benefited from composer John Lewis's made-to-order background music, which was provided via tape recordings, rather than live performance, and worked in the same fashion as a film score. A highly successful revival of Natural Affection was mounted in 2005 at Chicago's The Artistic Home. Directed by John Mossman, it was named by the Chicago Tribune one of the year's best productions.

Inge's The Last Pad premiered in Phoenix, Arizona, in 1972. Originally titled The Disposal, the world premiere of The Last Pad was produced by Robert L. "Bob" Johnson and directed by Keith A. Anderson through the Southwest Ensemble Theatre. The production starred Nick Nolte with Jim Matz and Richard Elmore (Elmer). The production moved to Los Angeles and opened just days after Inge died by suicide. The original production in Phoenix was proclaimed the Best Play of 1972 by the Arizona Republic, while the Los Angeles production brought awards to Nolte and helped introduce him to the film industry and catapult his subsequent film career.

The Last Pad is one of three of Inge's plays that either have openly gay characters or address homosexuality directly. The Boy in the Basement, a one-act play written in the early 1950s, but not published until 1962, is his only play that addresses homosexuality overtly, while Archie in The Last Pad and Pinky in Where's Daddy? (1966) are gay characters. Inge himself was closeted.

Summer Brave, produced posthumously on Broadway in 1975, is Inge's reworking of Picnic, as he noted:

It would be fair to say that Summer Brave is the original version of Picnic. I have written before that I never completely fulfilled my original intentions in writing Picnic before we went into production in 1953, and that I wrote what some considered a fortuitous ending in order to have a finished play to go into rehearsal. A couple of years after Picnic had closed on Broadway, after the film version had made its success, I got the early version out of my files and began to rework it, just for my own satisfaction. Summer Brave is the result. I admit that I prefer it to the version of the play that was produced, but I don't necessarily expect others to agree. Summer Brave might not have enjoyed any success on Broadway whatever, nor won any of the prizes that were bestowed upon Picnic. But I feel that it is more humorously true than Picnic, and it does fulfill my original intentions.

About two dozen unperformed plays by Inge began receiving wider attention in 2009. They were available for viewing, but not copying or borrowing, in the collection of his papers at Independence Community College. One, a three-act play titled Off the Main Road, was read at the Flea Theater in New York City on May 11, 2009, with Sigourney Weaver, Jay O. Sanders, and Frances Sternhagen in the cast. Another, The Killing, a one-act play, directed by José Angel Santana, and starring Neal Huff and J.J. Kandel, was performed at the 59E59 Theater, in New York City, through August 27, 2009. It is not yet known how many of these additional plays are complete. Besides Off the Main Road and The Killing, six others were performed in April 2009 at the William Inge Theater Festival, in Independence, Kansas. These six were published in A Complex Evening: Six Short Plays by William Inge.

=== Television and film ===
In 1962 Inge won an Academy Award for Splendor in the Grass (1961) (Best Writing, Story and Screenplay – Written Directly for the Screen). He made his film debut as a clergyman in the film. John Frankenheimer directed All Fall Down (1962), Inge's screenplay adaptation of the novel by James Leo Herlihy. Inge was unhappy with changes made to his screenplay for Bus Riley's Back in Town (1965), so at his insistence, the writing credit on the film is "Walter Gage".

During the 1961–62 television season, Inge was the script supervisor of ABC's Bus Stop TV series, an adaptation of his play. With Marilyn Maxwell as Grace Sherwood, the owner of Sherwood's Bus Station and Diner in a fictitious Colorado town, the series presented dramas about the townspeople and travelers who passed through the diner in 25 one-hour episodes. The sixth episode, "Cherie", with Tuesday Weld, Gary Lockwood and Joseph Cotten, was an abbreviated version of the original Bus Stop play. Robert Altman directed eight episodes, and one of these, "A Lion Walks Among Us", led to a Congressional hearing on violence. The episode, which starred Fabian Forte as a maniacal axe-wielding serial killer, was adapted from Tom Wicker's novel Told By an Idiot.

In 1963 Inge met with CBS to consider a one-hour filmed television drama about a family in a Midwestern town. The series, with six continuing characters, had the tentative title All Over Town, and was planned for the 1964–65 season. Instead, Inge did a play, Out on the Outskirts of Town, which was seen on November 6, 1964, on NBC as part of the Bob Hope Presents the Chrysler Theatre series. It starred Anne Bancroft and Jack Warden with Inge taking the role of the town doctor. NBC gave the play a repeat on June 25, 1965.

=== Novels ===

Inge wrote two novels, both set in the fictional town of Freedom, Kansas. In Good Luck, Miss Wyckoff (Atlantic-Little, Brown, 1970), high-school Latin teacher Evelyn Wyckoff loses her job because she has an affair with the school's black janitor. The novel's themes include spinsterhood, racism, sexual tension and public humiliation during the late 1950s. Polly Platt wrote the screenplay for the 1979 film adaptation starring Anne Heywood as Evelyn Wyckoff. The film was released under several titles: The Shaming, The Sin, Secret Yearnings and Good Luck, Miss Wyckoff.

My Son Is a Splendid Driver (Atlantic-Little, Brown, 1971) is an autobiographical novel that traces the Hansen family from 1919 into the second half of the 20th century. The novel received praise from Kirkus Reviews:

Mr. Inge's novel, told in the form of a memoir, is a little more extended than Good Luck, Miss Wyckoff and though there's a slackening of structure and splintering of content towards the second half, the first part is immaculate in both design and focus. It features the early years of Joey, the narrator here, and there are lovely scenes, as clear as the summer sunlight, with his family and on visits to assorted relatives. The time lag between Joey and his older brother Jule—his mother's favorite, my son the splendid driver, and an attractive playboy of this midwestern world—will never be reconciled. Even long after Jule's early death from a wanton incidental. Here Act I breaks away from Act II, a whole psychic anatomy of Joey's years as a young man in compressed and fractured incidents—one replayed from Miss Wyckoff and one which seems unnecessary (his parents' syphilis). Thus Joey grows up impaired, never resolving his relationship with his absentee father or insufficiently loving mother, and ends up with his "aloneness like a corridor that has no end". Inge has told his story of life and death and all those spaces in between with a gentleness and probity which gives his novel a persistence few writers achieve.

During the early 1970s Inge lived in Los Angeles, where he taught playwriting at the University of California, Irvine. His last several plays attracted little notice or critical acclaim, and he fell into a deep depression, convinced he would never be able to write well again.

== Death and legacy ==
Inge died of suicide by carbon monoxide poisoning on June 10, 1973, at the Hollywood, Los Angeles home he shared with his sister, Helene. He was 60 years old. Inge is buried at Mt. Hope Cemetery in his hometown of Independence, Kansas.

Inge has a star on the St. Louis Walk of Fame.

Beginning with the premiere of Come Back, Little Sheba in 1950, Inge became wealthy from the success of his plays and movies. On the advice of his financial advisors, he began to buy works of contemporary art so he could reduce his taxes by donating them to museums. According to his biographer, “He bought only what he liked, but had excellent fortune in choosing what was going to become valuable...” [e.g. works by de Kooning, Pollock, and Modigliani]. Inge liked the modern art he bought because “in its abstractions and distortions” he saw “a reflection of the distorted times in which he...lived, the times he...tried to portray” in his written work. He donated a total of ten contemporary paintings to the Nelson Gallery in Kansas City, Missouri.

A black box theater is named for William Inge in Murphy Hall at the University of Kansas.

Inge is a member of the American Theater Hall of Fame, inducted posthumously in 1979.

Since 1982, Independence Community College's William Inge Center for the Arts in his hometown has sponsored the annual William Inge Theatre Festival to honor playwrights. Prominent actors, directors, and writers come from Broadway and Hollywood to attend. The William Inge Collection at the college is the most extensive collection of Inge material, including 400 manuscripts, films, correspondence, theater programs, and other related items.

The March 2008 issue of The Brooklyn Rail featured interviews by playwright Adam Kraar of former Inge House resident playwrights Marcia Cebulska, Catherine Filloux, Caridad Svich, Lydia Stryk, and Alice Tuan, relating how Inge's life and work has influenced them.

== Works ==
Plays

- 1950: Come Back, Little Sheba
- 1953: Picnic
- 1955: Bus Stop
- 1957: The Dark at the Top of the Stairs
- 1959: A Loss of Roses
- 1962: Summer Brave (a reworking of Picnic)
- 1963: Natural Affection
- 1966: Where's Daddy?
- 1973: The Last Pad
- Off the Main Road

Short plays

- To Bobolink, for Her Spirit
- People in the Wind
- A Social Event
- The Boy in the Basement
- The Tiny Closet
- Memory of Summer
- Bus Riley's Back in Town
- The Rainy Afternoon
- The Mall
- An Incident at the Standish Arms
- The Strains of Triumph
- 1953: Glory in the Flower
- The Killing
- The Love Death
- The Silent Call
- Bad Breath
- Morning on the Beach
- Moving In
- A Murder

Film and TV

- 1952: Come Back Little Sheba
- 1955: Picnic
- 1956: Bus Stop
- 1960: The Dark at the Top of the Stairs
- 1961: Splendor in the Grass - Reverend Whitman (uncredited)
- 1963: All Fall Down
- 1963: The Stripper
- 1964: Out on the Outskirts of Town (a reworking of Off the Main Road) - Doctor (final appearance)
- 1965: Bus Riley's Back in Town (as Walter Gage)

Novels

- 1970: Good Luck, Miss Wyckoff
- 1971: My Son Is a Splendid Driver

== Further listening ==
- Natural Affection audio scenes and interview
