= On Golden Pond (2001 film) =

- Based on: On Golden Pond; 1979 play by Ernest Thompson
- Written by: Ernest Thompson
- Directed by: Ernest Thompson; Martin Pasetta (live broadcast director)
- Starring: Julie Andrews; Christopher Plummer; Glenne Headly; Sam Robards; Brett Cullen; Will Rothhaar
- Composer: Anthony Marinelli
- Country of origin: United States
- Original language: English

Production
- Executive producer: Craig Anderson
- Producer: Samuel J. Paul
- Cinematography: Victor J. Kemper
- Editor: Ernest Sanderson
- Running time: 100 minutes
- Production company: CBS Productions

Original release
- Network: CBS
- Release: April 29, 2001

On Golden Pond is a 2001 American live television adaptation of the play of the same name starring Julie Andrews and Christopher Plummer. The movie originally aired on CBS on April 29, 2001 and was filmed on a sound stage at CBS Television City in Los Angeles, California.

Julie Andrews and Christopher Plummer had previously starred in the highly successful 1965 film The Sound of Music, and their reuniting in this play was part of the promotion for the original broadcast of the film. The film is also notable because the author of the play, Ernest Thompson, directed this version, and Craig Anderson, the producer/director of the original Off Broadway and Broadway productions of the play, was the executive producer. For Andrews, the film marked the first instance of public singing, albeit only a few notes, since throat surgery ruined her singing voice in 1995.

Thompson provided rewrites to his original play for this broadcast. Most of the revisions are to Act II and center on the characters of Bill Ray and Charlie Martin.

Approximately 11.9 million people watched the production when it was initially released, the lowest viewership for a program in its time slot.

== Cast list ==
- Julie Andrews as Ethel Thayer
- Christopher Plummer as Norman Thayer
- Glenne Headly as Chelsea Thayer Wayne
- Sam Robards as Bill Ray
- Brett Cullen as Charlie Martin
- Will Rothhaar as Billy Ray Jr.

== Plot ==
For an approximate plot and synopsis, see On Golden Pond (1981 film) and On Golden Pond (play), respectively.

== Awards and nominations ==
=== Emmy Awards ===
- Nomination for Outstanding Art Direction for a Miniseries, Movie or a Special (2001)

== See also ==
- On Golden Pond (play)
- On Golden Pond (1981 movie)
