= If the Shoe Fits (film) =

- Film Poster
- Directed by: Tom Clegg
- Written by: Timothy Prager and Madeline Di Maggio & Pamela Wallace
- Produced by: Monique Annaud
- Starring: Rob Lowe; Jennifer Grey; Élisabeth Vitali; Andréa Ferréol; Rebecca Potok
- Cinematography: Henri Habans
- Edited by: Suzanne Lang-Willar
- Music by: Didier Vasseur
- Production companies: Canal+ Centre National de la Cinématographie; Chrysalide Film; The Movie Group
- Distributed by: CBS; Fox Home Video
- Release dates: October 1990 (Italy); June 26, 1991 (USA)
- Running time: 86 min.
- Countries: United States; France
- Language: English

If the Shoe Fits (also known as Stroke of Midnight) is a 1990 television film based on the fairy tale of Cinderella, starring Rob Lowe and Jennifer Grey. It was directed by Tom Clegg.

== Plot ==
In Paris, Kelly Carter (Jennifer Grey) is trying to develop her career as a shoe designer. Lost in Paris, Wanda the fairy (Andrea Ferreol) tries very hard to get directions on a crowded boulevard and nobody gives her attention but the sensible Kelly. Kelly goes to meet with famous fashion designer Francesco Salvitore (Rob Lowe), but is late for the appointment with him, and is turned away. Wanda meets Kelly again, and gives her advice, trying to instill confidence in her and help her succeed. Using a pretense, Wanda knocks on the door of Salvitore, who is floundering and looking for a 'new face' for his fashion house. She subtly suggests that he host a great ball at his residence, insisting that everything he needs is closer than he thinks. Wanda then imparts magical power to a pair of shoes Kelly has designed, that transform her into a stunning beauty. Attending the ball with friends, she attracts the attention of all the guests, and the smitten Salvitore; she is overwhelmed and flees, but he eventually tracks her down, and proclaims her his new diva.

== Cast ==
- Rob Lowe as Francesco Salvitore
- Jennifer Grey as Kelly Carter/Prudence
- Élisabeth Vitali as Véronique
- Andréa Ferréol as Wanda
- Rebecca Potok as Mimi Larcher
- Sacha Briquet as Cirage
- Florence Pelly as Taffy
- Alison Hornus as Domino
- Josephine Penedo as Carol
- Fabienne Chaudat as Receptionist

== Reception ==
Movie review website Moria gave the a movie a very bad review, stating: "It is all directed with a giddy silliness. Most of the cast overact at the level of cartoonish farce. Rob Lowe is a particular offender, deliberately giving a vain and preening performance."
