= Criminal Justice (film) =

- Written by: Andy Wolk
- Directed by: Andy Wolk
- Starring: Forest Whitaker; Anthony LaPaglia; Rosie Perez; Jennifer Grey; Tony Todd; Saundra McClain
- Composer: Elliot Goldenthal
- Country of origin: United States
- Original language: English

Production
- Producer: Michael Nozik
- Cinematography: Steven Fierberg
- Editor: Katherine Wenning
- Running time: 90 minutes
- Production companies: Elysian Films; HBO Showcase

Original release
- Network: HBO
- Release: September 8, 1990

Criminal Justice is a 1990 American drama film written and directed by Andy Wolk. The film stars Forest Whitaker, Anthony LaPaglia, Rosie Perez, Jennifer Grey, Tony Todd and Saundra McClain. The film premiered on HBO on September 8, 1990.

== Plot ==
A young prostitute is robbed in the vestibule of a building after having bought drugs and in the encounter suffers a deep and disfiguring slash to her face.

The detectives called to the crime scene, take the injured victim to the police station where she is handed photographs of some felons on their records. She identifies the perpetrator of the crime in the photograph.

The police arrest the suspect and after the victim again identifies her assailant in the police line-up, the perpetrator is charged with aggravated robbery.

At the arraignment, his bail is set at an unaffordable amount. Despite having to remain in custody, he denies any wrongdoing to his keen legal-aid lawyer. On account of his repeated claims of innocence, he refuses to accept any plea-bargain deal, no matter how favourable.

On the other hand, the District Attorney, battles to make the best of the victim/complainant's case which, despite her positive identification of the accused, is based only on her sole evidence. Coupled with this, the District Attorney has reason to believe she might not have been truthful about her reason for being in the building where she was assaulted and robbed in the first place. The complainant is apprehensive about the legal system but certain that the accused was her assailant.

Bail is refused for the accused and several court appearances take place while he awaits trial. The complainant, who suffers the effects of a drug lifestyle is outraged at the refusal of the accused to plead guilty, and, becomes increasingly unwilling to testify.

The trial date is set and, to the relief of the District Attorney on the day, the complainant enters the courtroom to commence her testimony. Upon seeing her enter the courtroom, the accused volubly instructs his lawyer to make a plea-bargain deal so that the trial is stopped.

For pleading guilty to both the robbery and slashing of the complainant, he is sentenced to 3 1/2 to 7 years in the penitentiary. From their divergent perspectives both the complainant and the mother of the accused feel dissatisfied about the outcome of the case.

== Cast ==
- Forest Whitaker as Jessie Williams
- Anthony LaPaglia as David Ringel
- Rosie Perez as Denise Moore
- Jennifer Grey as Liz Carter
- Tony Todd as Detective Riley
- Saundra McClain as Loretta Charles
- Joe Lisi as Detective Lane
- Stephen Pearlman as Judge Ratner
- William Cameron as Mitchell
- Chuck Cooper as Judge Whitney
- Bill Dalzell as Ratner's Clerk
- Charles Sanders as Assistant District Attorney Crosley
- Don Brockett as Judge Mulino
- Rick Applegate as Assistant District Attorney Matson
- Ro'ee Levi as T.N.T. Officer Rivers
- Benjamin J. Cain Jr. as P.J.
- Jacquay L. McCall as Jessie's Son
- Yancey Arias as Raymond Alvarez
- Marc Field as Ratner's Law Secretary
- Patricia Hicok as Juror Carson
- Lonzo Green as Juror Evans
- Ellsworth Gearinger as Juror Hughs
- Etta Cox as Juror Gibson
- Peter Wolk as Weiss
