= On Golden Pond (play) =

Play written by Ernest Thompson

- 1979 hardcover book publication
- Written by: Ernest Thompson
- Characters: Norman Thayer, Jr. Ethel Thayer; Chelsea Thayer Wayne; Billy Ray; Charlie Martin; Bill Ray Jr.
- Setting: The living room of a summer home on Golden Pond in Maine. Time is the present.

On Golden Pond is a 1979 play by Ernest Thompson. It opened on February 28, 1979 at the New Apollo Theatre, where it ran for 126 performances.The plot focuses on an aging couple, Ethel and Norman Thayer, who spend each summer at their home on a lake called Golden Pond. During the year the story takes place, they are visited by their daughter, Chelsea, her fiancé, Billy Ray, and his son, Billy Ray Jr. The play explores Chelsea and Norman's turbulent relationship, and the difficulties faced by a couple in the twilight years of a long marriage.

The play was adapted into the 1981 award-winning film of the same name starring Henry Fonda, Katharine Hepburn, and Jane Fonda.

== Synopsis ==
=== Act 1 ===
May

Norman and Ethel arrive at the summer house, finding it in need of repairs. There are hints that Norman is having problems with his memory.

June

To Ethel's chagrin, Norman makes a nominal effort to find a job in the classified ads. The mailman, Charlie, stops by and reminisces about the Thayers' daughter, Chelsea, whom he used to date. A letter arrives from Chelsea saying that she is coming from California with her boyfriend, Bill Ray, to celebrate Norman's 80th birthday. It becomes clearer that Norman is struggling with memory loss, as he continues to forget names and places that should be familiar.

July

Chelsea arrives with Bill and his 13-year-old son, Billy Ray Jr. Chelsea asks her parents if Billy Jr. can stay with them while she and Bill go to Europe. Ethel and a reluctant Norman agree to house Billy Jr. for the summer.

=== Act 2 ===
August

Norman and Billy Jr. have become friends, and spend much of their time fishing. Chelsea returns, and reveals that she and Bill are now married. Ethel shows her impatience with Chelsea's habit of bitterly harping on the past. Chelsea confronts her father about their troubled relationship, and the two have a reconciliation.

September

Norman and Ethel are packing to leave for the winter. Chelsea calls, and they agree to go visit her in California. Norman seems to suffer a heart attack while picking up a box of his mother-in-law's heavy china, but recovers, and the pair leave their home on Golden Pond.

== Productions ==
The first Broadway production was directed by Craig Anderson, with set and costume design by Steven Rubin, and lighting design by Craig Miller. After five previews, it opened on February 28, 1979 at the New Apollo Theatre, where it ran for 126 performances. The cast included Tom Aldredge (Norman Thayer Jr.), Frances Sternhagen (Ethel Thayer), Ronn Carroll (Charlie Martin), Barbara Andres (Chelsea Thayer Wayne), Mark Bendo (Billy Ray), and Stan Lachow (Bill Ray). After a summer break, it reopened with the same cast on September 12 at the Century Theatre, a small playhouse in the basement of the Paramount Hotel, where it ran for an additional 256 performances. Ben Slack replaced Ronn Carroll during the course of the Century Theatre run.

After 19 previews, a Broadway revival with an African-American cast, directed by Leonard Foglia and produced by Jeffrey Finn, opened on April 7, 2005 at the Cort Theatre, where it ran for 93 performances. James Earl Jones and Leslie Uggams headed the cast. The production closed suddenly after Jones, who often was ill during the run, was diagnosed with pneumonia.

Michael Learned and Tom Bosley starred in a 2006–2007 U.S. national tour also produced by Finn. Jack Klugman headlined a 2008 tour.

== Adaptations ==
Thompson also wrote a screen adaptation of the play. The film, also titled On Golden Pond, was released in December 1981, directed by Mark Rydell, and produced by Bruce Gilbert with Henry Fonda, Katharine Hepburn, and Jane Fonda starring.

In 2001, CBS aired a live television adaptation of the play that received significant media attention due to the reunion of The Sound of Music stars Julie Andrews and Christopher Plummer in the lead roles. For Julie Andrews, the broadcast marked her first public song performance (albeit one of only a few notes) since a 1995 throat surgery that had impaired her singing voice.

== Nominations ==
1979 production

- Tony Award for Best Actress in a Play (Sternhagen)
- Drama Desk Award for Outstanding New Play
- Drama Desk Award for Outstanding Actor in a Play (Aldredge)
- Drama Desk Award for Outstanding Actress in a Play (Sternhagen)
- Drama Desk Award for Outstanding Costume Design
- Drama Desk Award for Outstanding Set Design
- 1979 Selection, The Burns Mantle Theater Yearbook, The Best Plays of 1978–1979

2005 production

- Tony Award for Best Revival of a Play
- Tony Award for Best Actor in a Play (Jones)
