= List of Dutch films of the 1990s =

The following is a list of films produced in the Netherlands during the 1990s. The films are produced in the Dutch language.

== 1990 ==
Title	Director	Cast	Genre	Notes
Alissa in Concert	Erik van Zuylen		Music; Drama	
Crocodiles in Amsterdam	Annette Apon	Yolana Entius, Anette Apon	Comedy	
In Krakende Welstand	Mijke de Jong	Ottolien Boeschoten	Drama	
De Gulle Minnaar	Mady Saks	Peter Faber, Mariska van Kolck	Comedy; Drama	
Han de Wit	Joost Ranzijn	Koen De Bouw, Nelly Frijda	Drama	
Mijn Blauwen Hemel	Ronald Beer	Ruud de Wolf, Bo Bojoh	Drama	a.k.a. My Blue Heaven
Kracht	Frouke Fokkema	Theu Boermans, Anneke Blok	Drama	
Romeo	Rita Horst	Monique van de Ven, Johan Leysen	Drama	Entered into the 17th Moscow International Film Festival
Een Vreemde Liefde	Pim de la Para			
Het Phoenix Mysterie		Liz Snoyink	Drama	
Spelen of Sterven	Frank Krom	Geert Hunaerts	Drama	

== 1991 ==
Title	Director	Cast	Genre	Notes
Eline Vere	Harry Kumel	Marianne Basler, Thom Hoffman	Drama	co-production with Belgium and France
Intensive Care	Dorna,x de Rouveroy	Nada van Nie, Koen Wouters	Horror	
De Provincie	Jan Bosdriesz	Tamar van den Dop, Thom Hoffman	Drama	
Sebastian Star Bear: First Mission			Animated	
The Indecent Woman	Ben Verbong	Jose Way, Huub Stapel	Erotic; Drama	
The Night of the Wild Donkeys	Pim de la Parra	Liz Snoyink, Kenneth Hardegein	Drama	
Een Dubbeltje te Weinig	André van Duren	Boris Rodenko; Doris Dagelet	Drama	
Openbaringen van een Slapeloze	Pim de la Parra	Miguel Stigter, Liz Snoyink	Drama	
Oh Boy!	Orlow Seunke	Orlow Seunke, Kees van Kooten	Comedy	
Elias of het gevecht met de nachtegalen				
Labyrinth of Lust	Pim de la Parra			

== 1992 ==
Title	Director	Cast	Genre	Notes
Boven de Bergen	Digna Sinke	Roos Blauwboer, Catherine ten Bruggencate	Drama	
De Bunker	Gerard Soeteman	Thom Hoffman	Drama; War	
Daens	Stijn Coninx	Jan Decleir; Antje De Boeck; Michael Pas	Drama; Romantic	
For a Lost Soldier	Roeland Kerbosch	Andrew Kelly, Jeroen Krabbe	War; Drama	
Flodders in America	Dick Maas	Nelly Frijda, Huub Stapel	Comedy	
Heading for England	André van Duren	Geert Lageveen; Peter Faber	Drama	
Ik ga Naar Tahiti	Gerrard Verhage	Hans Dagelet	Drama; War	
Ivanhood	Paul Ruven	Christo van Klaveren; Carine Korteweg	Comedy; Drama	
The Johnsons	Rudolf van den Berg	Monique van de Ven, Esmée de la Bretonière	Thriller; Horror	
The Northerners	Alex van Warmerdam	Rudolf Lucieer, Jack Wouterse	Drama; Comedy	
Transit	Eddy Terstall		Drama	
Rooksporen	Frans van de Staak	Peter Blok; Marlies Heuer	Drama	
The Sunday Child	Pieter Verhoeff	Tom van Hezik, Rik van Uffelen	Drama	
Het Zakmes	Ben Sombogaart	Olivier Tuinier; Verno Romney	Family	

== 1993 ==
Title	Director	Cast	Genre	Notes
Angie	Martin Lagestee	Annemarie Rottgering, Daniel Boissevain	Drama	
Belle van Zuylen - Madame de Charrière	Digna Sinke	Will van Kralingen	Historical drama	
The Betrayed	Frans Weisz	Gijs Scholten van Aschat	Drama	Entered into the 43rd Berlin International Film Festival
Vals licht	Theo van Gogh	Amanda Ooms, Thom Hoffman	Drama	
Going Home (Oeroeg)	Hans Hylkema	Rik Launspach, Martin Schwab	Drama	
Het is een schone dag geweest				
It Will Never Be Spring	Frouke Fokkema	Hilde van Mieghem, Thom Hoffman	Drama	
The Little Blonde Dead	Jean van de Velde	Antonie Kamerling, Olivier Tuinier	Drama	
Love Hurts	Mijke de Jong	Marieke Heebink, Mark Rietman	Drama	
The Mozart Bird	Ian Kerkhof	Daniel Daran, Stacey Grace	Drama; Romantic	
Seventh Heaven		Urbanus, Renée Soutendijk	Comedy	Belgian co-production
The Three Best Things in Life	Ger Poppelaars	Loes Wouterson, Victor Low	Drama; Comedy	Entered into the 18th Moscow International Film Festival
Unknown Time	Marianna Dikker	Amanda ooms Jules Hamel	Drama	

== 1994 ==
Title	Director	Cast	Genre	Notes
De Flat	Ben Verbong	Renée Soutendijk	Drama; Thriller	
06	Theo van Gogh	Arianne Schluter, Ad van Kempen	Drama	
The Butterfly Lifts the Cat Up	Willeke van Ammelrooy	Arjan Kindermans, Marjolein Beumer	Drama	
Old Tongues	Gerardjan Rijnders	Catherine ten Bruggencate; Mark Rietman	Drama	
Rock n Roll Junkie	Jan Eilander	Herman Brood	Docu	
1000 Roses	Theu Boermans	Marieke Heebink, Jaap Spijkers	Drama	Won the Golden Calf for Best Feature Film
The Other End of the Tunnel				
De nietsnut	Ab van Ieperen	Pierre Bokma; Jacques Bonnaffé	Drama	

== 1995 ==
Title	Director	Cast	Genre	Notes
Antonia's Line	Marleen Gorris	Willeke van Ammelrooy, Els Dottermans	Drama	
Aletta Jacobs: Het Hoogste Streven				
The Purse Snatcher	Maria Peters	Olivier Tuinier	Family; Drama	
Once Beaten, Twice Shy	Gerard Verhage	Jack Wouterse; Ineke Veenhoven	Drama	
The Flying Dutchman	Jos Stelling	René Groothof	Drama	
Long Live the Queen	Esmée Lammers	Monique van de Ven, Derek de Lint	Family	
Little Sister	Robert-Jan Westdijk	Kim van Kooten, Roeland Fernhout	Comedy; Drama	
Goodbye	Heddy Honigmann	Johanna ter Steege; Els Dottermans	Drama	Belgian co-production
Hoogste Tijd	Frans Weisz	Rijk de Gooyer	Drama	
De Schaduwlopers	Peter Dop	Pierre Bokma	Drama; Comedy	
Walhalla	Eddy Terstall			
Flodder 3	Dick Maas	Nelly Frijda; Stefan de Walle	Comedy	
Filmpje!	Paul Ruven	Paul de Leeuw	Comedy	
Brylcream Boulevard	Robbe De Hert	Gert-Jan Dröge; Babette van Veen	Comedy; Drama	

== 1996 ==
Title	Director	Cast	Genre	Notes
The Dress	Alex van Warmerdam	Alex van Warmerdam	Comedy; Drama	
Laagland	Jolanda Entius	Marcel Musters; Lineke Rijxman	Drama; Comedy	
Charlotte Sophie Bentinck				
Punk Lawyer		Pierre Bokma		
Blind date	Theo van Gogh			
De Zeemeerman		Daniel Boissevain; Gonny Gaakeer	Comedy	
Naar de Klote!	Ian Kerkhof	Tygo Gernandt, Thom Hoffman	Drama	first movie concerning the Dutch Dance Scene
Marrakech				
Another Mother	Paula van der Oest			Estonian co-production
Tasten in het duister				
The Boy Who Stopped Talking				
O Amor Natural				

== 1997 ==
Title	Director	Cast	Genre	Notes
Tropic of Emerald		Esmée de la Bretonnière	Drama	
De Langste Reis				
All Stars	Jean van de Velde	Antonie Kamerling	Comedy; Drama	
Karakter	Mike van Diem	Fedja van Huet, Jan Decleir	Drama	Won an Oscar
Broos				
The Cherry Pick				
Mijn Franse tante Gazeuse				
De Verstekeling				
Lovely Liza	Maria Peters	Gonny Gaakeer; Stijn Westenend	Drama	
Vrijmarkt (film)	Hans Hylkema	Anneke Blok; Jack Wouterse	Drama	

== 1998 ==
Title	Director	Cast	Genre	Notes
Tate's Voyage		Cees Geel; Thekla Reuten	Drama	
Babylon	Eddy Terstall			
Felice ...Felice				
Het 14e kippetje		Antonie Kamerling; Thekla Reuten		
Siberia	Robert-Jan Westdijk	Roeland Fernhout; Hugo Metsers III		
The Polish Bride	Karim Traida	Monic Hendrickx; Jaap Spijkers	Drama	
When the Light Comes	Stijn Coninx	Francesca Vanthielen; Rick Engelkes		a.k.a. Licht; Belgian-Dutch-German-Danish co-production
De Pijnbank	Theo van Gogh	Paul de Leeuw; Roeland Fernhout	Drama; Crime	
FL 19,99		Thomas Acda	Comedy	
Left Luggage	Jeroen Krabbe		Drama	Entered into the 48th Berlin International Film Festival
Temmink: The Ultimate Fight		Jack Wouterse	Action; Drama	
Dandelion Game				
Scratches in the Table		Thomas Acda		
Little Tony	Alex van Warmerdam	Alexa van Warmerdan; Annet Malherbe	Comedy; Drama	Screened at the 1998 Cannes Film Festival
Ivoren Wachters				
The Flying Liftboy		Rick van Gastel; Annet Malherbe	Family	

== 1999 ==
Title	Director	Cast	Genre	Notes
Kruimeltje	Maria Peters	Thekla Reuten; Rick Engelkes		
De Boekverfilming	Eddy Terstall	Dirk Zeelenberg	Comedy	
Man, Vrouw, Hondje		Kees Brusse		
Suzy Q	Martin Koolhoven	Carice van Houten	Drama; Comedy	(Telefilm)
De Trein van zes uur tien				
Maten				
Cowboy uit Iran				
No Trains No Planes	Jos Stelling	Katja Schuurman; Kees Prins		
Missing Link (1999 film)		Thomas Acda; Tamar van der Dop	Family; Drama	Set in 1956
Jesus Is a Palestinian	Lodewijk Crijns	Hans Teeuwen; Kim van Kooten	Comedy; Drama	
Nachtvlinder	Herman van Veen	Babette van Veen; Herman van Veen	Drama	
Baantjer, de film: De Cock en de wraak zonder einde		Piet Romer; Victor Reinier	Drama; Crime	
De rode zwaan				
Guts		Viggo Waas; Rick Engelkes	Drama; Comedy	
Unter den Palmen		Helmut Berger, Udo Kier, Thom Hoffman	Drama	Dutch-German co-production
