= Inge Beekman =

Dutch actress (1924–2009)

- Born: Ingeborg Elfriede Augusta Beekman; 20 December 1924; Nieuwer-Amstel, Netherlands
- Died: 12 June 2009 (aged 84); Netherlands
- Occupation: Actress
- Years active: 1950s–2000s
- Children: Dick Maas (born 1951)
- Parent: Wim Beekman (1895–1934)

Ingeborg Elfriede Augusta “Inge” Beekman (20 December 1924 – 12 June 2009) was a Dutch stage actress and also played in films and television series. She appeared in dozens productions during her career, which spanned over half a century.

== Personal life ==
She was born on 20 December 1924 in Nieuwer-Amstel. Her father was Wim Beekman (1895–1934), KLM captain who was killed during the 1934 KLM Douglas DC-2 crash. Inge Beekman was the mother of Dutch film director, screenwriter and film producer Dick Maas.

She lived during the 1980s on a houseboat in Amsterdam. She died on 12 June 2009, at the age of 84 years old. She was cremated six days later on 18 June in Amsterdam, at Westgaarde.

== Career ==
She studied at the Amsterdam Drama School from 1942 to 1945. Due to personal circumstances, did not begin her acting career until 1953. She played in among others De drie zusters, Lessen in laster and De zeewolf. Three years later, she stopped as a stage actor due to family reasons. In the late 1970s, however, she returned briefly on stage to participate in several student films produced by the Netherlands Film Academy. According to Theaterencyclopedie she played in a totaal of 9 stage productions. Most of them were with Nederlandse Comedie but she also played with De Witte Vogel and Toneelgroep Amsterdam.

Beekman was also a television and film actress. She frequently collaborated with her son, director Dick Maas, and appeared in several of his films, with the last being two years before her death.

== Works ==
=== Stage ===
- St. Joan (1954)
- Elektra (1954)
- De drie zusters (1954)
- De bruiloft van Kloris en Roosje (1955)
- Lessen in laster (1955)
- De zeewolf (1955)
- De gouden draagkoets (1955)
- De bruiloft van Kloris en Roosje (1956)
- Ifigeneia in Aulis (1988)

=== Television series ===
- Zeg 'ns Aaa (1981)
- Flodder (TV series, 1994–1995)

=== Films ===
- Flodder (1986)
- Amsterdamned (1988)
- Intensive Care (1991)
- Flodder in Amerika! (1992)
- Do Not Disturb (1999)
- Down (2001)
- Moordwijven (2007)
