= Nelly Frijda =

Dutch actress, voice actor and politician (born 1936)

Nelly Frijda-Wiegel
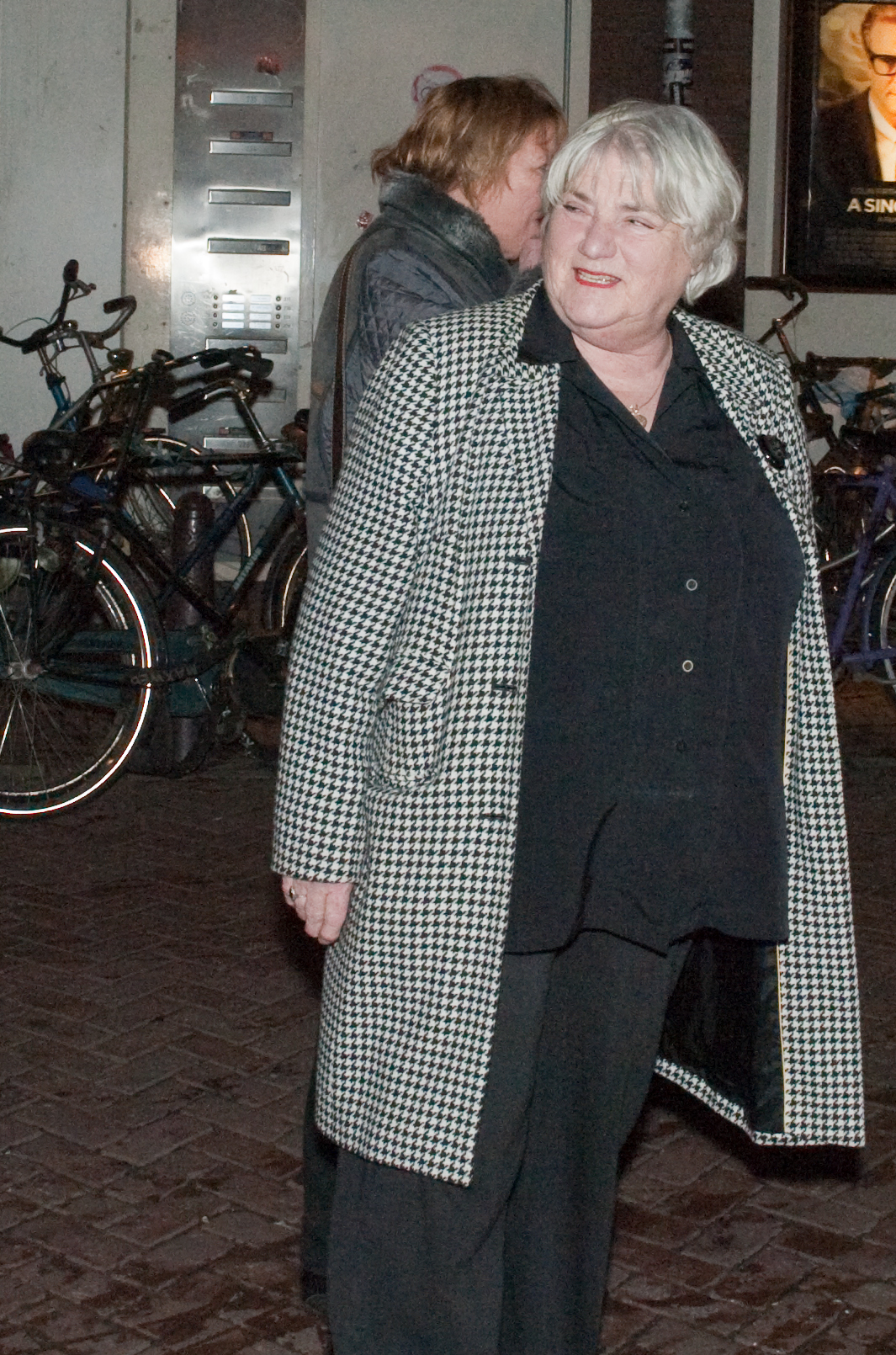
- Frijda in 2010

Member of the municipal council of Amsterdam
- In office 2010–2011
- Succeeded by: Pitt Treumann

Personal details
- Born: Nelly Wiegel; 4 May 1936 (age 90) Amsterdam, Netherlands
- Party: Red Amsterdam
- Spouse: Nico Frijda (m. 1959; div. 1975)
- Occupation: Actress; voice actress; cabaret artist; politician

Nelly Frijda-Wiegel (born 4 May 1936) is a Dutch retired actress, cabaret performer, activist and politician.

== Early life and education ==
Frijda was born in Amsterdam as the daughter of Johannes Wiegel and Alida van Moorsel, and grew up in an SDAP family in the Rivierenbuurt. She attended the Montessori Lyceum Amsterdam and the Spinoza Lyceum. She then went to the Academy of Theatre and Dance. She ran away from home when she was seventeen and went to live independently on Bloemgracht. Frijda was expelled from the academy after three months – according to her own words "due to anti-social behavior, lack of imagination and lack of talent".

== Acting career ==
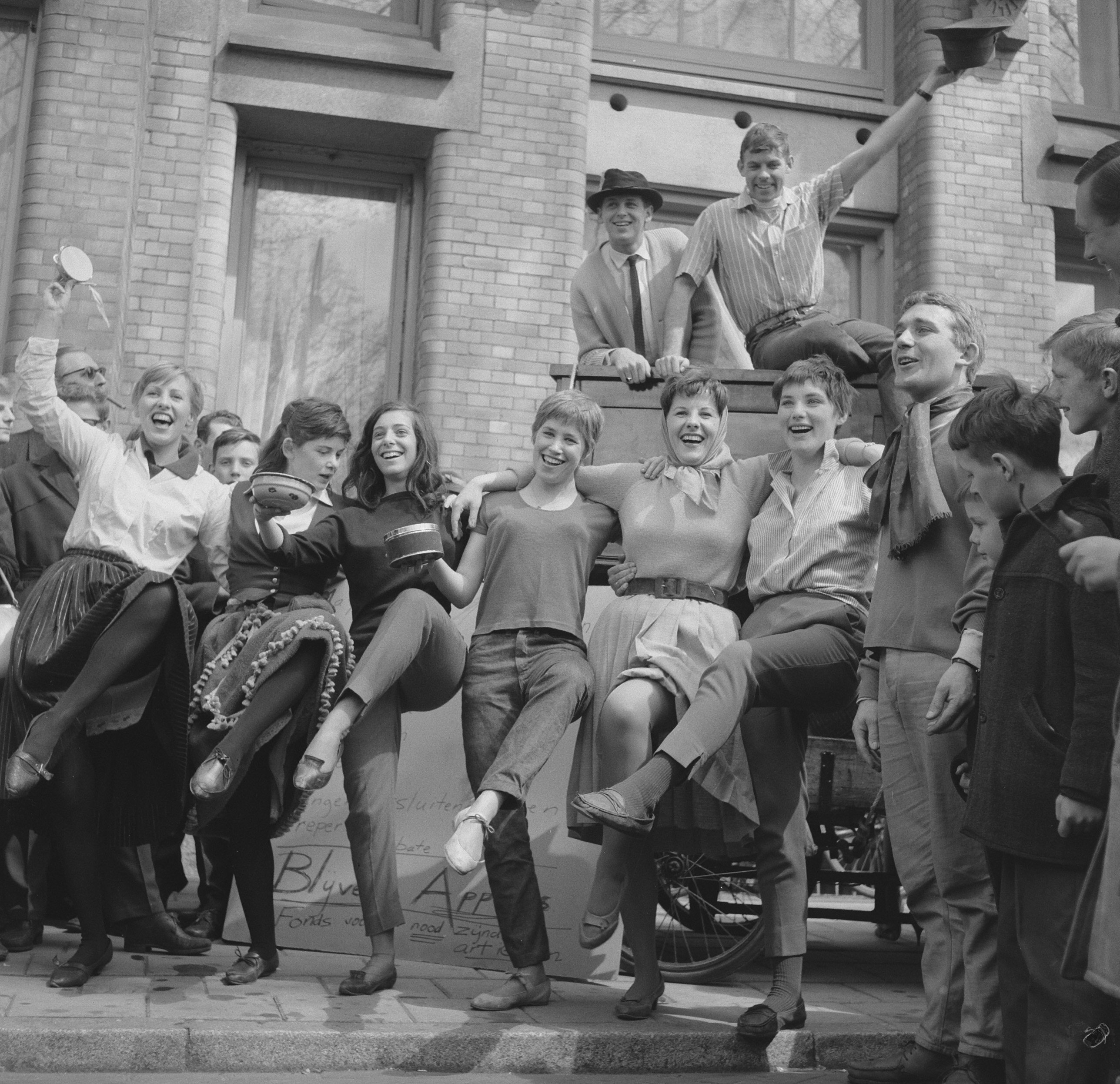
The ABC cabaret (1962) with Nelly Frijda as the leftmost woman and Jenny Arean in the middle

Frijda made her debut in 1955 in Wim Kan's cabaret, and was part of Cabaret Ratjetoe with, among others, Rinus Ferdinandusse and Berend Boudewijn. She then appeared in plays and musicals. She appeared in about twenty films - including four by Pim de la Parra, and Moutarde van Sonansee by Toon Hermans – and in a number of television series. She has also dubbed in Dutch in several films and series, such as the sea witch Ursula in The Little Mermaid and Zira in The Lion King II: Simba's Pride.

Frijda is best known to the general public as Ma Flodder from the three Flodder films and television series of the same name. She played this role from 1986 to 1997. The last episode aired in 1999.

In 2012, Frijda said goodbye to the stage. In 2015 there was talk of a return. However, this did not happen for health reasons.

== Political career ==
In 1997, Frijda campaigned against the controversial construction of Metro line 52, more commonly known in Amsterdam as the Noord/Zuidlijn. When the excavation work in 2008 led to serious subsidence of houses on the Vijzelgracht, she presented the political party Red Amsterdam ('Save Amsterdam'), which she had founded with lawyer Nelleke van 't Hoogerhuijs, on 10 December 2009. The party's most important program point was to stop the construction of the Noord/Zuidlijn, and by extension to stop all expensive prestige plans in Amsterdam; such as the development of the Zuidas, the Second Sea Lock, housing locations on IJburg 2 and 3 and the desire to bring the Olympic Games to Amsterdam. The party won one seat in the 2010 municipal elections. Frijda was second on the list but was elected with preferential votes. She served on the municipal council for a year, until March 2011. At her farewell, Frijda's collected speeches in the city council, entitled Ik dacht dat een kunstschouw een nep-open haard was ("I thought an art show was a fake fireplace"), were presented to Mayor Eberhard van der Laan. Party member and former PvdA councilor Pitt Treumann subsequently occupied the Red Amsterdam municipal council seat, also for a period of one year. From 2012 to 2014, Roderic Evans-Knaup was the councilor for this party.

== Personal life ==
On 13 May 1959, Frijda married psychologist Nico Frijda, with whom she had a daughter and two sons. This marriage was dissolved on 21 August 1975; Frijda continued to use her ex-husband's surname, because everyone was already familiar with this name.

She had become involved in the women's movement in the 1960s and lived with Annemarie Grewel for ten years after her divorce. She lived on the Prinsengracht for many years, but at the age of 79 she moved into a residential care center in the Jordaan. Her second son, Michael Frijda, is a helmsman on inland shipping and also an author: he wrote the novel Ritselingen, which was shortlisted for the Libris Prize. The other son lives with his family in Japan.

== Filmography (selection) ==
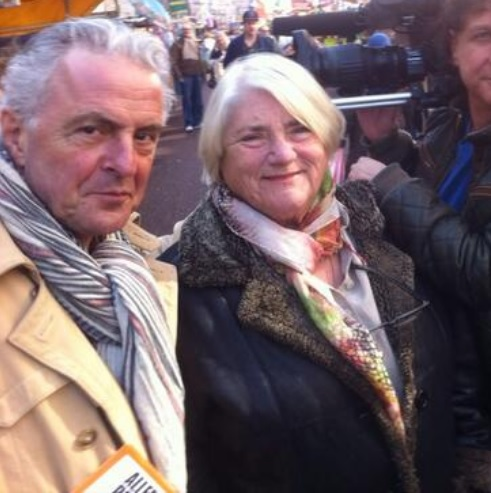
Frijda and fellow Flodder actor Huub Stapel

- Moutarde van Sonansee (1959), Caroline Tulipe
- Rubia's Jungle (1970), journalist
- Mijn nachten met Susan, Olga, Julie, Piet en Sandra (1975), Piet
- Keetje Tippel (1975), hair washer
- A Question of Silence (1982), Annie
- Flodder (1986), Ma Flodder
- Als in een Roes (1986), whore
- The Little Mermaid (1989), Ursula (Dutch voice-over)
- Han de Wit (1990), mother
- Eline Vere (1991), ms. Verstraeten
- The Johnsons (1992), aunt of Peter
- Flodders in America (1992), Ma Flodder
- Just Friends (1993), role unknown
- Flodder 3 (1995), Ma Flodder
- Balto (1995), grandma (Dutch voice-over)
- The Little Mermaid (TV series, 1997), Ursula (Dutch voice-over)
- Flodder (TV series, 1993–1999), Ma Flodder
- Mijn Franse tante Gazeuse (1997), mayor
- Mulan (1998), matchmaker (Dutch voice-over)
- The Lion King II: Simba's Pride (1998), Zira (Dutch voice-over)
- Help! I'm a Fish (2000), aunt of Anna (Dutch voice-over)
- Monsters, Inc. (2001), Roz (Dutch voice-over)
- Alice in Glamourland (2004), mother of Alice
- Madagascar: Escape 2 Africa (2008), Nana (Dutch voice-over)
- Kinderen geen bezwaar (2010), Elly de Mol
- Monsters University (2013), Roz (Dutch voice-over)
