= Lettie Oosthoek =

Dutch actress (1937–2026)

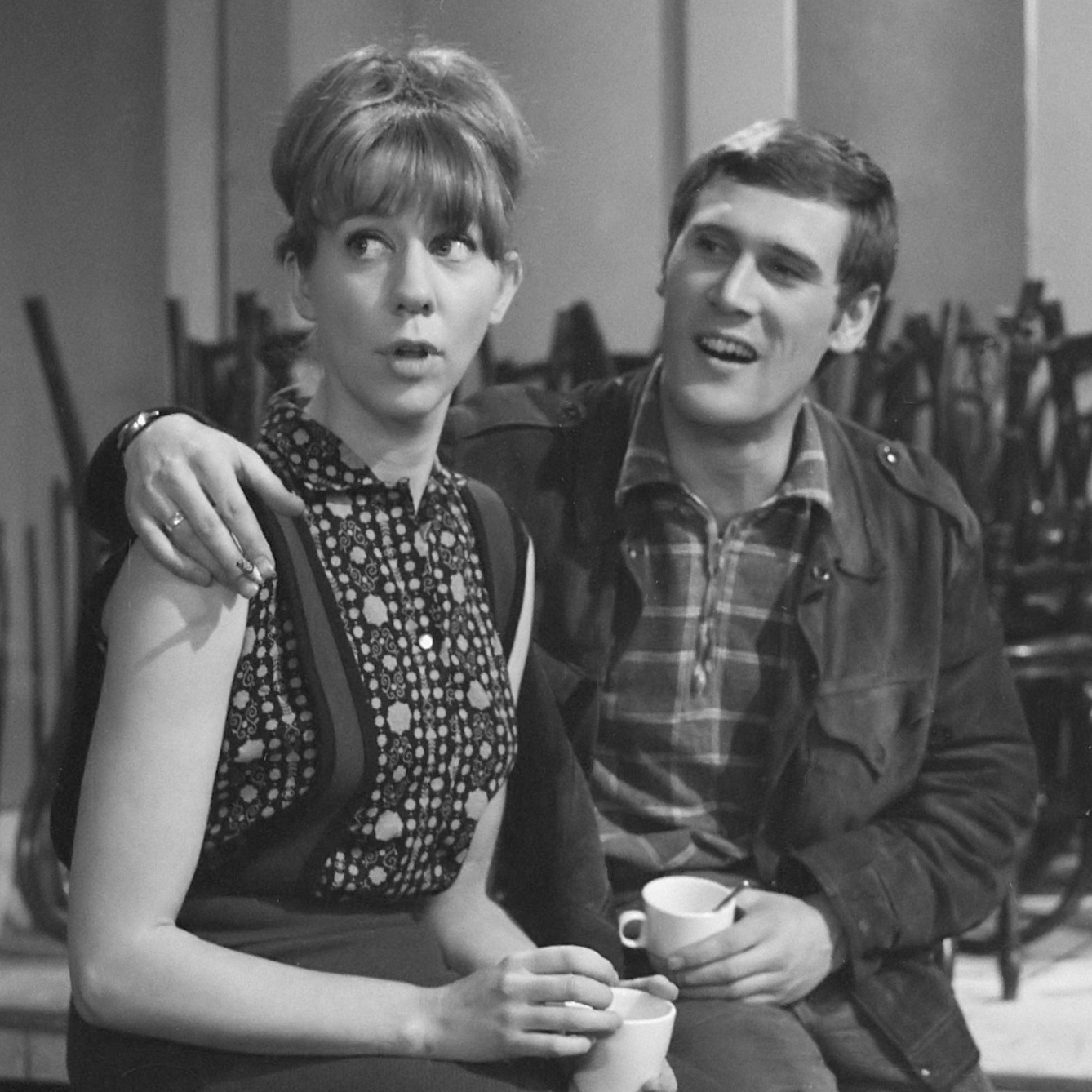
- Oosthoek with Jules Hamel in 1966
- Born: Aletta Lapère; 18 October 1937; Zaandam, Netherlands
- Died: 12 June 2026 (aged 88)
- Education: Toneelschool Arnhem
- Occupation: Actress

Aletta "Lettie" Oosthoek (née Lapère; 18 October 1937 – 12 June 2026) was a Dutch actress. Her final public appearance came in January 2026 at the EYE Film Institute Netherlands to celebrate the 40th anniversary of the film Flodder.

Oosthoek died on 12 June 2026, at the age of 88.

== Filmography ==
- Blindgangers (1977)
- An Bloem (1983)
- Flodder (1986)
- Dossier Verhulst (1986)
- Amsterdamned (1988)
- Een dubbeltje te weinig (1991)
- Flodders in America (1992)
- Flodder 3 (1993)
- Keyzer & De Boer Advocaten (2006)
