= Yves Taschereau =

Canadian writer and journalist (1943–2020)

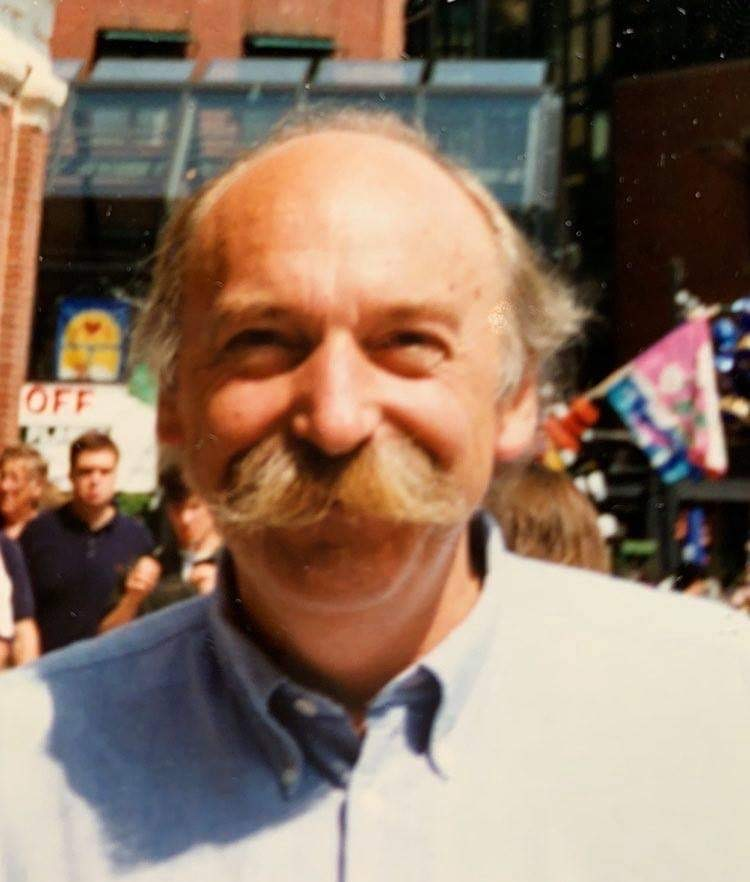
- Yves Taschereau
- Born: 11 March 1943
- Died: 10 October 2020 (aged 77); Montreal, Quebec, Canada
- Occupation: Writer

Yves Taschereau (11 March 1943 – 10 October 2020) was a Canadian writer and journalist.

== Biography ==
=== Writer ===
A graduate of the Université de Montréal, Taschereau submitted his master's thesis on Jacques Ferron, titled Le Médecin et la médecine dans l’œuvre de Jacques Ferron, and published by Éditions de l'Homme under the title Le Portuna : La Médecine dans l’œuvre de Jacques Ferron. It was said that his essay " brings something new: for medicine constitutes, in Jacques Ferron's work, a constant which illuminates the inner world of the novelist and the storyteller - a sort of partial key which allows an approximate deciphering of its deep message". That same year, he contributed to a special issue of the magazine Études françaises on Réjean Ducharme with an article titled Le Vrai Nez qui voque. In 1976, he co-signed a book on singer Diane Dufresne, portraying her as a Quebec diva. He wrote Comme dit Confucius, a collection of humorous maxims which he created for the television host Patrice L'Écuyer on the program Les Détecteurs de mensonges. In addition to his literary writings, he published a book in 1978 on philately titled Collectionner les timbres.

=== Journalist ===
Taschereau directed a medium-length documentary on Jacques Ferron titled Jacques Ferron, qui êtes-vous ?. The documentary featured an exclusive interview with Ferron and discussed his medical practices and writer career while living in Gaspésie.

Taschereau was a prolific journalist in Quebec in the 1980s. He contributed to the French language edition of Maclean's magazine, which subsequently became L'actualité. He also contributed to the magazine Croc and the newspaper Châtelaine. He was the French editor of Air Canada's En route magazine. He also wrote texts for the satirical comic strip Les Ravibreurs, inspired by the history of the Lavigueur family and published in Croc. He would receive three National Magazine Awards for articles published in L'actualité.

In addition to his journalistic career, Yaschereau worked as a music columnist for the television channel CFTM-DT. He invented the concept for the game show Détecteurs de mensonges and Squelettes dans le placard. He was also the co-designer for Piment Fort. He also wrote a number of humorous television shows for children, such as Le Club des 100 Watts, Watatatow, and Un gars, une fille.

Yves Taschereau died in Montreal on 10 October 2020 at the age of 77.

== Awards and nominations ==
=== National Magazine Awards ===
- Culture Category
1. La Solitude de la chanteureuse du fond in L'actualité (1978)
2. Diane Dufresne : La Vie à vif in L'actualité (1982)
- Business Category
1. Un casino nommé Québec in L'actualité (1979)

=== Prix Gémeaux ===
- Best Text for a Children's Television Series (1990, 1991, 1992, 1993 for Le Club des 100 Watts)
- Best Original Game Show Creation (1990, 1991, 1992 for Détecteurs de mensonges)
- Immortal Television Show (2003 for Détecteurs de mensonges)

== Publications ==
- Le Médecin et la médecine dans l’œuvre de Jacques Ferron (1974)
- Le Portuna : La Médecine dans l'œuvre de Jacques Ferron (1975)
- Diane Dufresne (1976)
- Collectionner les timbres (1978)
- Asi Se Colleccionan Sellos/How to Collect Stamps (1984)
- Comme disait Confucius (1993)
