= Lavigueur family =

Canadian lottery winners

The Lavigueur family is a Quebec family who made headlines in Canada in the 1980s after winning a lottery jackpot of $7,650,267 in 1986, then the largest prize ever given by Loto-Québec. The trials and troubles of the Lavigueur family have since become entrenched in Quebec popular culture for various reasons: the fact that a poor family became multimillionaires overnight; the intervention of a stranger who found the lottery ticket lost by the family's father; the judicial saga of one of the family's daughters, the only member of the family to not have participated in the purchase of the winning ticket, suing her father for a fraction of the jackpot; the subsequent family disputes that tore apart the family which dissipated its fortune, all of which received wide coverage in the mainstream media of Quebec.

== Jackpot ==
The Lavigueurs lived in Centre-Sud, a neighbourhood of Montreal, Quebec. Jean-Guy Lavigueur had been unemployed for a year and a half after having worked for 34 years at United Bedding Company.

The father had been raising his four children, Sylvie, Yve, Louise and Michel, with the help of his brother-in-law Jean-Marie Daudelin, since the death of the children's mother, Micheline Daudelin, who died of sudden cardiac arrest in 1983. The couple also had two girls who died in infancy from heart problems.

A few days before the draw, Jean-Guy Lavigueur lost his wallet, which was given back to him by a good Samaritan, 28-year-old William Murphy, from Vancouver, British Columbia, who had recently moved to Montreal, and was himself unemployed. Murphy found the wallet and gave it back to Lavigueur, with the lottery ticket which he knew was the jackpot winner. When he got to the Lavigueur house, the eldest son, Yve, answered the door and refused to let him in, not understanding what he wanted. Murphy came back a second time to meet the father.

The new millionaires were Jean-Guy, Sylvie, Yve and Michel Lavigueur, Jean-Marie Daudelin, and William Murphy, with whom the family agreed to share the jackpot. In 1986, Louise Lavigueur, the only member of the family who did not take part in the purchase of the ticket, sued her father to get a share of the jackpot.

== Family members ==
Two members of the Lavigueur family are still alive: Yve and Sylvie. Yve published a book in 2000 about the family's story and helped with the production of a 6-episode TV series which was broadcast by SRC, the French-language branch of the CBC, in 2008. Sylvie chose to remain away from public life.

Louise Lavigueur died from heart failure in 1991, at age 22. The father, Jean-Guy Lavigueur, died from respiratory problems on November 26, 2000.

Michel Lavigueur committed suicide on February 11, 2004, at age 32.

== Popular culture ==
=== Television ===
On December 31, 1986, in a humorous year-end review, Bye-bye 86, Radio-Canada included a sketch titled "Le bourgeois gentilhomme Lavigueur," inspired by Molière's Le Bourgeois gentilhomme.

=== Comics ===
From 1986 to 1989, the humour magazine Croc published a monthly satirical comic titled Les Ravibreur, which showed the newly famous family and depicted them as simple-minded, uneducated people. The main character was easily recognizable as a caricature of Jean-Guy Lavigueur.

=== Movies ===
From 1986, three Dutch movies (Flodder, Flodder in Amerika, and Flodder 3) were translated into joual in Quebec and given the French titles Les Lavigueur déménagent, Les Lavigueur redéménagent and Les Lavigueur, le retour. However, these comedies had nothing to do with the real-life family or their experiences.

== Books and TV ==
In 2000, Yve Lavigueur published Les Lavigueur: leur véritable histoire ("The Lavigueurs: the real story", ISBN 2-89035-341-9) with Éditions St-Martin. The book became the basis for a TV series shot in 2007 and broadcast in 2008. The series was directed by Sylvain Archambault, who had directed Le négociateur.
