= Coen van Vrijberghe de Coningh =

Dutch actor, musician, composer (1950–1997)

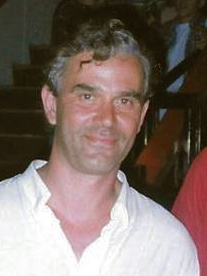
- De Coningh in 1995
- Born: Coenraad Lodewijk Dirk van Vrijberghe de Coningh; 12 November 1950; Amsterdam, Netherlands
- Died: 15 November 1997 (aged 47); Almere, Netherlands
- Occupations: Actor; singer; composer; record producer; television presenter
- Years active: 1977–1997
- Partner: Wivineke van Groningen (1984–1997)
- Father: Cruys Voorbergh
- Relatives: Emmy van Vrijberghe de Coningh (sister)
- Musical career
- Genres: Pop; cabaret; Nederpop
- Instruments: Vocals; guitar; bass
- Label: EMI
- Website: Coen van Vrijberghe de Coningh.nl

Coenraad Lodewijk Dirk "Coen" van Vrijberghe de Coningh (12 November 1950 – 15 November 1997) was a Dutch actor, singer, composer, record producer and television presenter.

== Biography ==
Born in Amsterdam to actor Cruys Voorbergh and the younger brother of artist Emmy van Vrijberghe de Coningh, he enrolled at the Academy of Theatre and Dance at the age of 17. He also played the guitar in high school. After graduation, De Coningh made his stage debut as a background singer and dancer in plays written by Annie M. G. Schmidt and Harry Bannink and he appeared in a cabaret sketch by Rients Gratama in the mid-1970s. He also served as the host of the NCRV show Showroom from 1977 until 1980.

On screen, De Coningh appeared in the 1989 film Lily Was Here. Before the film, he originally shortened his name to "Van Vrijberghe" as he felt his name was too long for movie posters. He was however, best known to Dutch audiences for his role as Johnnie Flodder in the television series Flodder from 1993.

In 1987, he formed a cabaret band with Theo Nijland and Han Oldigs called The Shooting Party. In 1996, De Coningh provided the voice of Buzz Lightyear in the Dutch-Language version of the 1995 animated film Toy Story.

=== Personal life ===
From 1984 until his death in 1997, De Coningh was in a relationship with actress Wivineke van Groningen.

== Death ==
On 15 November 1997, while attending a private company party with Stefan de Walle and Tatjana Šimić three days after his 47th birthday, De Coningh suffered a fatal heart attack and died after attempts to resuscitate him failed. He was buried at Zorgvlied Cemetery.

Following De Coningh's death, Flodder was promptly cancelled once his posthumous appearances aired. The Shooting Party was also disbanded.

== Filmography ==
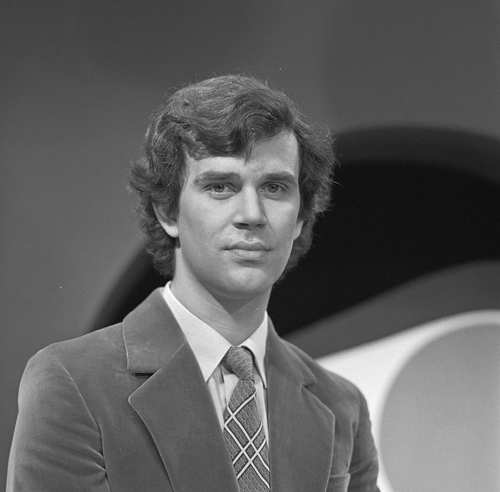
De Coningh in 1978

=== Cinema ===
- Lily Was Here (1989) – Ted
- Wilde Harten (1989) – Visser/Afficheplakker
- Alaska (1989) – Mario
- Het nadeel van de twijfel (1990) – Simon
- The Indecent Woman (1991) – Charles
- Ik verlaat je nooit (1993)
- Flodder 3 (1995) – Johnnie Flodder
- Marie Antoinette is Not Dead (1996) – Journalist
- The Boy Who Stopped Talking (1996) – Politieagent

=== Television ===
- Switch (1988) – Martin
- Prettig geregeld (1988)
- Familie Oudenrijn (1990) – Hank
- Staten Generaal (1991) – Journalist Jos
- Recht voor z'n raab (1992) – Architect Paul Esders
- Watt?! (1992) – Presenter
- Pleidooi (1993) – Harry Govers
- In voor- en tegenspoed (1993) – Makelaar
- Flodder (1993–1999) – Johnnie Flodder (partial posthumous release)
- Kats & Co (1994) – Paul Kats
- Bruin Goud (1995) – Haddert Halma
- 12 steden, 13 ongelukken (1996) – Ruud Erkels
- Zeeuws Meisje (1997) – Hypnotiseur Aga Oerie Kahn
- De Nieuwsgier (1997) – Various
- Knoop in je Zakdoek (1997) – Rob

=== Voice dubbing ===
- The Rescuers Down Under (1991) – Jake
- Toy Story (1996) – Buzz Lightyear
- 101 Dalmatians (1997) – Jasper
- Anastasia (1998) – Grigori Rasputin (posthumous release)
