= Blindgangers =

1977 film

- Directed by: Ate de Jong
- Release date: 1977
- Running time: 101 minutes
- Country: Netherlands
- Language: Dutch

Blindgangers is a 1977 Dutch drama film directed by Ate de Jong.

== Plot ==
After having dated for a few months, Danielle and Mark decide to move in together. Everything goes well for a few years, until Mark expresses he does not believe in stable, committed relationships. When Danielle gets pregnant, Mark decides to leave. He throws himself into swinging and starts seeing another woman. This then leads to an on-and-off relationship between Mark and Danielle. Eventually, Danielle decides to take the train to Yugoslavia, never to see Mark again.

== Cast ==
- Ansje Beentjes as Danielle
- Jimmy Berghout as aPaul
- Diana Dobbelman as Doctor
- Ben Hulsman as Fons
- Michiel Kerbosch as Soldier
- Wim Kouwenhoven as Policeman
- Maroesja Lacunes as Anette
- Derek de Lint as Mark
- Emile van Moerkerken as Blind Man
- Lettie Oosthoek as Joke
