= First Floor Features =

Defunct Dutch film production company

- On-screen logo used from 1986 until 1999.
- Type: Besloten vennootschap
- Industry: Film
- Founded: 1984
- Founders: Laurens Geels; Dick Maas; Robert Swaab
- Defunct: 25 February 2004
- Fate: Bankruptcy
- Products: Motion pictures

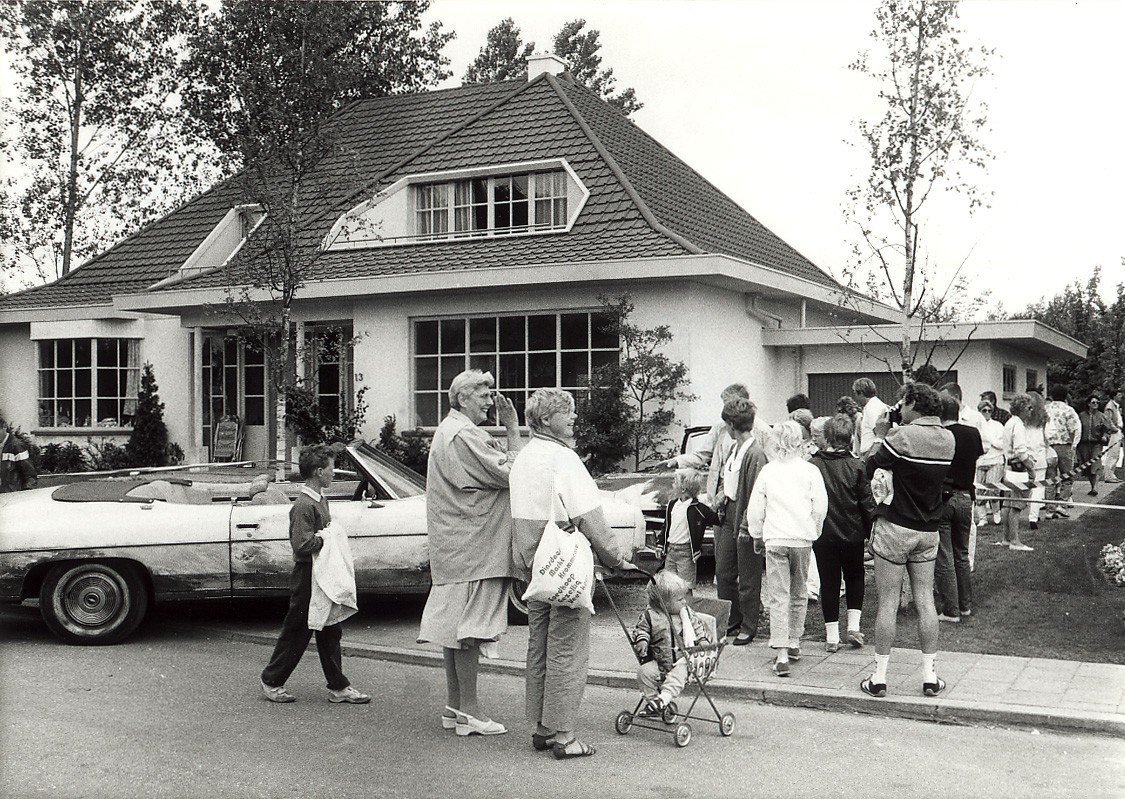
The Flodder set in 1986.

First Floor Features is a Dutch film production company founded by Laurens Geels, Dick Maas and Robert Swaab.

== History ==
First Floor Features was founded in 1984

The first film the studio released was Abel in 1986.

In 1991, Geels and Maas built a film studio in Almere. In March 1991, the studio complex was opened by Minister Hedy d'Ancona and the two studio spaces of 900 and almost 1700 m², respectively, could also be rented by other film producers.However, interest was disappointing, and the 10 million guilder Film Factory was sold to the NOB with First Floor Features becoming a tenant. The outside area of the studios consisted of the set houses of Zonnedael, used for filming the Flodder TV series. In 1999, the house for Big Brother was placed here.

In 1998, the company focused on the English-language market. The 1999 film Do Not Disturb attracted few viewers, and the 2001 English-language remake of the film The Lift, Down even became a flop. Dick Maas left the organization in 2002.

The cost of the English-language film Resistance turned out to be much higher than expected, and FFF ran into financial problems from which the company was unable to recover. On 25 February 2004, the company was declared bankrupt.

== Filmography ==
=== Film ===
Year	Title	Director	Distributor
1986	Abel	Alex van Warmerdam	Concorde Film
1986	Flodder	Dick Maas	Concorde Film
1988	Amsterdamned	Dick Maas	Concorde Film
1990	Wings of Fame	Otakar Votocek	Cannon Film Distributors
1990	My Blue Heaven	Ronald Beer	Cannon Tuschinski Film Distribution
1991	Een dubbeltje te weinig	André van Duren	The Movies
1991	Oh Boy!	Orlow Seunke	Concorde Film
1992	The Northerners	Alex van Warmerdam	United International Pictures
1992	Flodders in America	Dick Maas	United International Pictures
1995	Long Live the Queen	Esmé Lammers	Concorde Film
1995	Flodder 3	Dick Maas	Concorde Film
1997	Character	Mike van Diem	Buena Vista International
1999	De Rode Zwaan	Martin Lagestee	Buena Vista International
1999	Do Not Disturb	Dick Maas	Buena Vista International
2001	Down	Dick Maas	Buena Vista International
2002	Tom & Thomas	Esmé Lammers	Buena Vista International
2002	Valentín	Alejandro Agresti	Cinemien
2003	Resistance	Todd Komarnicki	A-Film Distribution

=== Television ===
- Flodder (1993-1999)
- Westzijde Posse (1996-1997)
