= Dick Rienstra =

Dutch singer and actor (1941–2021)

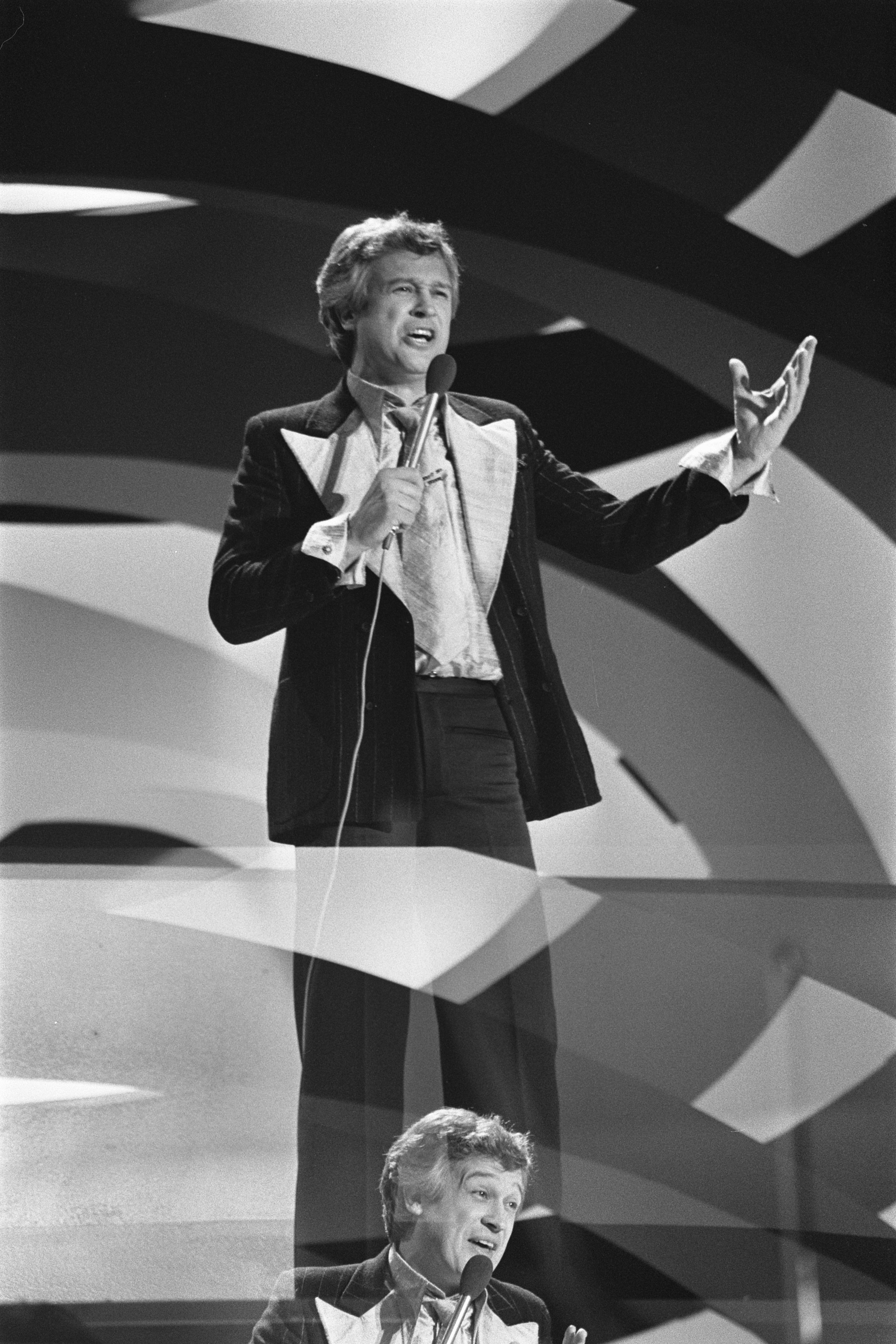
- Rienstra in 1977
- Born: 9 February 1941; Assen, Netherlands
- Died: 4 July 2021 (aged 80)
- Years active: 1975–2006
- Notable work: Flodders in America (1992)

Dick Rienstra (1941 – 2021) was a Dutch singer and actor. Rienstra began his musical career in a local group, The Double S Combo, where he sang and played guitar, clarinet, and saxophone. In 1960 he debuted on the radio in a KRO program, and in 1962 on the TV, in a VARA talent show. He moved to Amsterdam in 1963 and got a job in a musical comedy production as a singer and an actor in skits, and in 1966 signed with the Snip en Snap Revue. With the Amsterdams Volkstoneel he performed in the musical De Jantjes, and later formed a musical duo called De Jantjes as well. He was a contender in the preliminaries for the Eurovision Song Contest in 1977, and after that performed in the theater and in minor roles on television. He played a role in the comedy film Flodders in America (1992) and played the lead in the EO drama series De laatste carrier (1994).

== Filmography ==
Year	Title	Role	Notes
1975	Keetje Tippel	Cop	Uncredited
1977	A Bridge Too Far	Captain Krafft	
1992	Flodders in America	Captain	
1998	Ngo si seoi	Army	
2006	Sinterklaas en het Uur van de Waarheid	Commissaris	
