= Wings of Fame =

- Theatrical release poster
- Directed by: Otakar Votocek
- Screenplay by: Herman Koch; Otakar Votocek
- Produced by: Laurens Geels; Dick Maas
- Starring: Peter O'Toole; Colin Firth
- Cinematography: Alex Thomson
- Edited by: Hans van Dongen
- Music by: Paul M. van Brugge
- Production company: First Floor Features
- Distributed by: Cannon Film Distributors
- Release dates: 23 March 1990 (Netherlands); 26 April 1991 (UK)
- Running time: 116 minutes
- Country: Netherlands
- Language: English

Wings of Fame is a 1990 Dutch English-language comedy fantasy film (released in the UK on 26 April 1991) directed by Otakar Votocek and starring Peter O'Toole, Colin Firth, Marie Trintignant, Andréa Ferréol and Robert Stephens. The script was written by Dutch writer Herman Koch.

== Plot ==
A famous movie actor (Peter O'Toole) claims that he has written a book. As result, a real author, not a very well known writer, vengefully kills him but then dies as a result of an accident. Next, they both find themselves in after-life, where souls of all famous people are gathered.

== Cast ==
- Peter O'Toole as Cesar Valentin
- Colin Firth as Brian Smith
- Marie Trintignant as Bianca
- Andréa Ferréol as Theresa
- Robert Stephens as Merrick
- Ellen Umlauf as Aristida
- Maria Becker as Dr. Frisch
- Walter Gotell as Receptionist
- Gottfried John as Zlatogorski
- Michiel Romeyn as Baldesari
- Nicolas Chagrin as Delgado
- Ken Campbell as Head Waiter
