= Down (film) =

2001 horror film directed by Dick Maas

- Theatrical release poster
- Directed by: Dick Maas
- Written by: Dick Maas
- Produced by: Laurens Geels; Dick Maas
- Starring: James Marshall; Naomi Watts; Eric Thal; Michael Ironside; Edward Herrmann; Ron Perlman
- Cinematography: Marc Felperlaan
- Edited by: Bert Rijkelijkhuizen
- Music by: Paul M. van Brugge
- Production companies: First Floor Features; AVRO
- Distributed by: Buena Vista International
- Release dates: 11 May 2001 (Cannes Film Festival); 6 September 2001 (Netherlands)
- Running time: 110 minutes
- Country: Netherlands
- Language: English
- Budget: $13 million
- Box office: $535,658

Down (re-titled The Shaft on US releases) is a 2001 English-language Dutch science fiction horror film written and directed by Dick Maas and starring James Marshall, Naomi Watts, and Eric Thal. It is a remake of the 1983 Dutch-language film The Lift, which was also directed by Maas.

Watts plays the role of pushy journalist Jennifer Evans, and Marshall as repairman and former Marine Mark Newman. The movie was mainly filmed in the Netherlands, although the crew briefly visited New York City and the District of Columbia as well for exterior shots.

The film was funded by Nederlands Fonds, and produced by First Floor Features and AVRO, with post-production by Sapex Scripts. It premiered at the Cannes Film Festival in May 2001, and was released in the Netherlands on 6 September by Buena Vista International.

== Plot ==
In New York City, a stray lightning bolt strikes the 102-floor, 73-elevator Millennium Building. The three main express elevators begin acting strangely, resulting in a guard's flashlight being crushed. The next day, a group of pregnant women are held up between floors 21 and 22; The elevator overheats rapidly, causing two women to give birth and hospitalizing the rest. Reporter Jennifer Evans is called to write a report on the incident. After an investigation by METEOR elevator company technicians Jeff McClellan and Mark Newman, they determine that nothing is wrong with the elevators, a large part being Jeff's inability to actually admit there is something wrong (he states throughout his scenes that the computer controlling the elevators has absolutely no defects).

A short time later, a blind man and his guide dog disappear in the building. The two guards from the beginning of the film discover the dog's corpse hanging from its collar on a shaft support. The discovering guard's head is caught between the elevator doors. He is decapitated a short while later, his partner too horrified to help him. Once again, the METEOR executives find nothing wrong with the elevators. Evans interviews Newman, who sarcastically states "Nine people out of ten make it out of an elevator alive." Evans places this in her report, causing a large controversy over his statement by his boss, Mitchell, and the police. During the same day, a roller skater is sucked into an elevator in the parking garage and shot out from the 86th floor of the building to his death. The roller skater's death is explained to the media as suicide.

Evans visits Newman and shows him a tape of the roller skater's death. She points out the time it normally takes for the elevator to go up 86 floors would take about 40 seconds to a minute. However, the elevator ascended the floors in less than two seconds, thus noting that there is definitely something wrong. When they try to show the tape to Jeff, he refuses to watch it and leaves abruptly. Instead, they go to Evans' office and look up a man named Gunther Steinberg, who had been experimenting with organic reproducing computer chips using dolphin brains. However, the project had gone disastrously wrong, and Steinberg was fired. Later the next morning, Milligan, who remains suspicious of the elevators throughout the film, discovers Jeff's corpse in an elevator shaft. When Jennifer and Mark arrive, they are shocked to hear that the police have concocted a story of Jeff being a terrorist behind the incidents, to assure the public that the threat is over. Later during the day, an elevator cab flies to the top floor at such a speed that the floor flies off and all the people in it are killed. This event reaches the President and is seen as an act of terrorism.

A terrorism unit is assembled at the building to get any further terrorists out of the building. Meanwhile, Jennifer and Mark discover a recent suicide could be linked to the incidents, as his extremely superstitious widow believes his soul has returned to punish others. Jennifer and Mark enter the building to discover and stop the threat once and for all. During the entry, Jennifer is taken into custody posing as a METEOR executive. During her first attempt to prove this fraud, she receives a phone call from a friend to explain that while Steinberg's time working on the chips had been revoked, Steinberg continued to work on the project, except not with dolphin brains.

Eventually, Mitchell abandons Steinberg for fear of his reputation being ruined. Mark manages to get into the Millennium Building and discovers a large bio-chip in the form of a brain in an elevator shaft. It is assumed that this brain is alive and controlling the elevators. He attempts to destroy it using a screwdriver, but this attempt fails when it sends a flaming elevator down to kill him. Mark barely escapes while the elevator kills a SWAT officer who was barely out of the elevator shaft before he was sliced in half from his waist down, with the upper half of his body sliding across the floor. Mark gets hold of a stinger missile launcher and is about to destroy the organ when Steinberg intervenes, threatening him. Jennifer appears, having escaped custody, and frees Mark. As Mark tries to destroy the organ a third time, the police enter, giving Steinberg the opportunity to hold Jennifer hostage. Jennifer manages to escape thanks to Steinberg being unable to recognize one of his superiors. Steinberg is grabbed by the elevator shaft cables and pulled in, along with Mark. At the last second, Jennifer kicks the stinger launcher to Mark, who proceeds to destroy the organ. Steinberg's mutilated corpse falls seconds later.

Sometime later, Mark and Jennifer leave the hospital where they find themselves trapped in an elevator. However, it proves to be a ruse for Mark to make a romantic overture toward Jennifer.

== Cast ==
- James Marshall as Mark Newman
- Naomi Watts as Jennifer Evans
- Eric Thal as Jeffrey McClellan
- Michael Ironside as Gunter Steinberg
- Edward Herrmann as Matthew Milligan
- Dan Hedaya as Lt. McBain
- Ron Perlman as Adrian Mitchell
- Kathryn Meisle as Mildred
- Martin McDougall as Guard Andy
- John Cariani as Guard Gary
- David Gwillim as Mr. Faith
- Hanneke Riemer as Nanny from Hell

== Production ==
Following the release of his film The Lift in 1983, Dutch filmmaker Dick Maas intended to direct a remake of the film. Warner Bros. the international distributor of the original film, approached Maas regarding a remake for American audiences, but nothing materialized until the mid-1990s when Maas officially began work on the project.

=== Filming ===
Principal photography took place in New York City and the Netherlands. Exterior shots were taken on locations such as on 6th Avenue and Manhattan, while in the Netherlands, interior shots were shot at the First Floor Factory in Almere and Amsterdam.

== Release ==
=== Theatrical ===
Down premiered at the Cannes Film Festival on May 11, 2001. The film was released in the Netherlands on September 6, by Buena Vista International.

=== Home media ===
The film was released on DVD and VHS in the Netherlands on 4 September 2002 by Buena Vista Home Entertainment.

In the United States, the film was released on DVD by Artisan Entertainment on 20 May 2003, retitled as The Shaft. The film was later released on Blu-ray, under its original title, on 31 October 2017 by Blue Underground. It was initially slated to release on 10 October 2017, but was quietly delayed.

== Reception ==
Rotten Tomatoes reported that 20% of critics have given the film a positive review based on 5 reviews, with an average rating of 4.40/10. Common criticisms wrote that the film was not gripping enough, had a weak storyline, generally unrealistic deaths, weak dialogue and unconvincing special effects.

Down received mostly negative reviews from film critics in the Netherlands. In his review for Algemeen Dagblad, Ab Zagt wrote that the film "falls short on nearly every front. The dialogue is often too long, the pacing too slow for this genre, the plot twists sometimes ridiculously simple, and the humor on the stale side.

Mariska Graveland of the Filmkrant considered the film to be an improvement over Maas' previous English-language film Do Not Disturb, writing "predictable Down may be, not just for those who cherish fond memories of The Lift, the film still holds its own for a while thanks to its strong premise".
