= Dick Maas =

Dutch film director (born 1951)

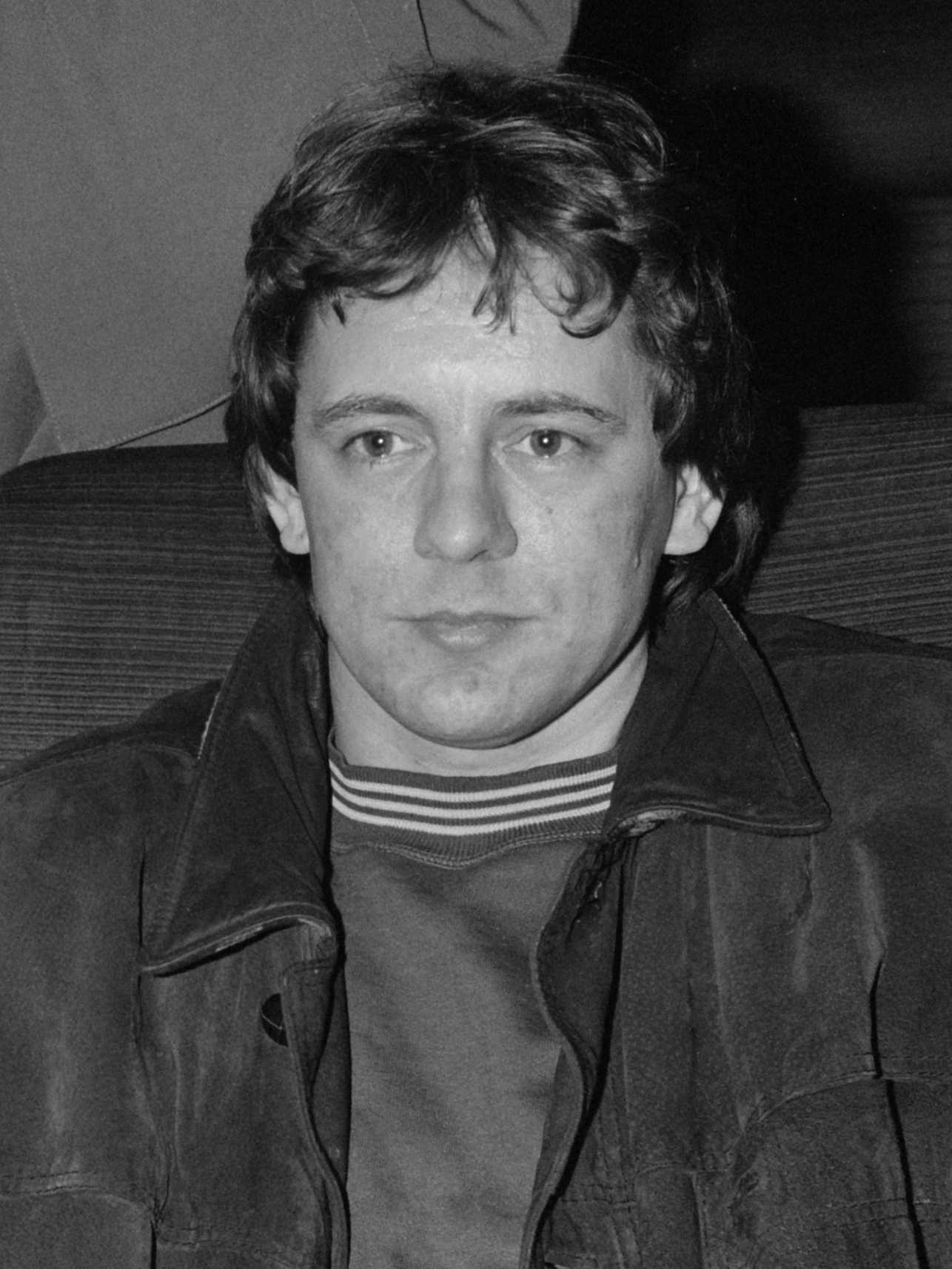
- Maas in 1988
- Born: Dirk Herman Willem Maas; 15 April 1951 (age 75); Heemstede, Netherlands
- Occupations: Director; screenwriter; producer; composer; author
- Years active: 1974–present
- Spouse: Esmé Lammers
- Children: 2
- Website: dickmaas.com

Dirk Herman Willem Maas (Dick) (born 15 April 1951) is a Dutch film director, screenwriter, film producer and film composer.

== Career ==
Maas achieved fame after the success of his music videos for the Dutch band Golden Earring, including "Twilight Zone" and the controversial "When the Lady Smiles," and his films De Lift, Amsterdamned and Flodder in the 1980s. Maas also directed the controversial Saint Nicolas slasher Sint (Saint Nick) and one episode of the TV series Young Indiana Jones. The film Karakter won the Academy Award for Best Foreign Language Film in 1998. Maas served as executive producer. The film was produced by his production company First Floor Features, founded in 1984. He left the company, which he started with Laurens Geels, in 2002.

His 2016 film Prey became an unexpected box office hit in China cinemas in 2019. It is also the first Dutch film to secure a wide theatrical release in China. The film was retitled as Violent Fierce Lion.

An authorized documentary about his career titled De Dick Maas Methode premiered at the Netherlands Film Festival on September 27, 2020, in Utrecht.

In 1998 he wrote his first thriller, titled Salvo (ISBN 978-90-820704-3-9). In 2016 followed by a book in which he wrote about his career as a filmmaker (ISBN 978-90-820704-2-2). The Naked Witness (ISBN 978-90-820704-6-0) is the title of his 2021 book based on his 1988 film Amsterdamned. According to Maas it is the first in a series of books based on this film.

In December 2023 Maas announced that he is working on a sequel to his 1988 film Amsterdamned. Filming started in September of 2024. The film was released in December 2025. Huub Stapel again plays the leading role. On the first day the film attracted 8820 paying visitors, making it the most successful opening for a Dutch film in 2025.

In April 2026 the Belgian production and distribution company Studio 100 announced that they are collaborating with Maas to produce a musical based on his 1986 film Flodder. The musical is scheduled to premiere in September 2027.

== Personal life ==
Dick Herman Willem Maas was born on 15 April 1951 in Heemstede in the Netherlands. His mother was actress Inge Beekman (1924–2009). The father of Inge, his grandfather he never knew, was Wim Beekman (1895–1934), KLM captain who was killed during the 1934 KLM Douglas DC-2 crash.

Maas is married to fellow film director Esmé Lammers, a granddaughter of Max Euwe, World Chess Champion 1935–1937.

== Filmography ==
=== As Director ===
==== Music videos ====
- 1982 – "Twilight Zone" – Golden Earring
- 1984 – "Clear Night Moonlight" – Golden Earring
- 1984 – "When the Lady Smiles" – Golden Earring
- 1988 – "Amsterdamned" – Loïs Lane
- 1988 – " Haunted Guitar " – Billy Falcon
- 1989 – " Turn The World Around " – Golden Earring
- 1997 – "Burning Stuntman" – Golden Earring
- 1997 – " Dance in the Light " – Mai Tai (band)
- 2003 – " Afscheid Nemen Bestaat Niet " – Marco Borsato
- 2004 – " Laat me Gaan " – Marco Borsato

==== Shorts ====
- Historia Morbi – 1974
- Picknick- 1975
- Adelbert – 1977
- Bon Bon – 1979
- Onder De Maat – 1979
- Overval – 1979
- Idylle – 1979
- Rigor Mortis – 1980
- Long Distance – 2003

=== Television ===
- Flodder (1993–1994, 8 episodes)
- The Young Indiana Jones Chronicles (1993; episode "Transylvania")

==== Features ====
- 1983 – The Lift
- 1986 – Flodder
- 1988 – Amsterdamned
- 1992 – Flodder in America (aka Flodder 2)
- 1995 – Flodder 3
- 1999 – Do Not Disturb
- 2001 – Down
- 2007 – Killer Babes
- 2010 – Sint
- 2012 – Quiz
- 2016 – Prey
- 2025 – Amsterdamned II

=== As Producer ===
==== Features ====
- 1986 – Abel
- 1990 – Wings of Fame
- 1990 – My Blue Heaven
- 1991 – Oh Boy!
- 1992 – The Northerners
- 1995 – Long Live the Queen
- 2002 – Tom & Thomas

==== Executive ====
- 1997 – Character
- 1999 – De rode zwaan
- 2002 – Valentín
- 2003 – Resistance
- 2024 – Mejor viuda que mal acompañada
