= Snip en Snap =

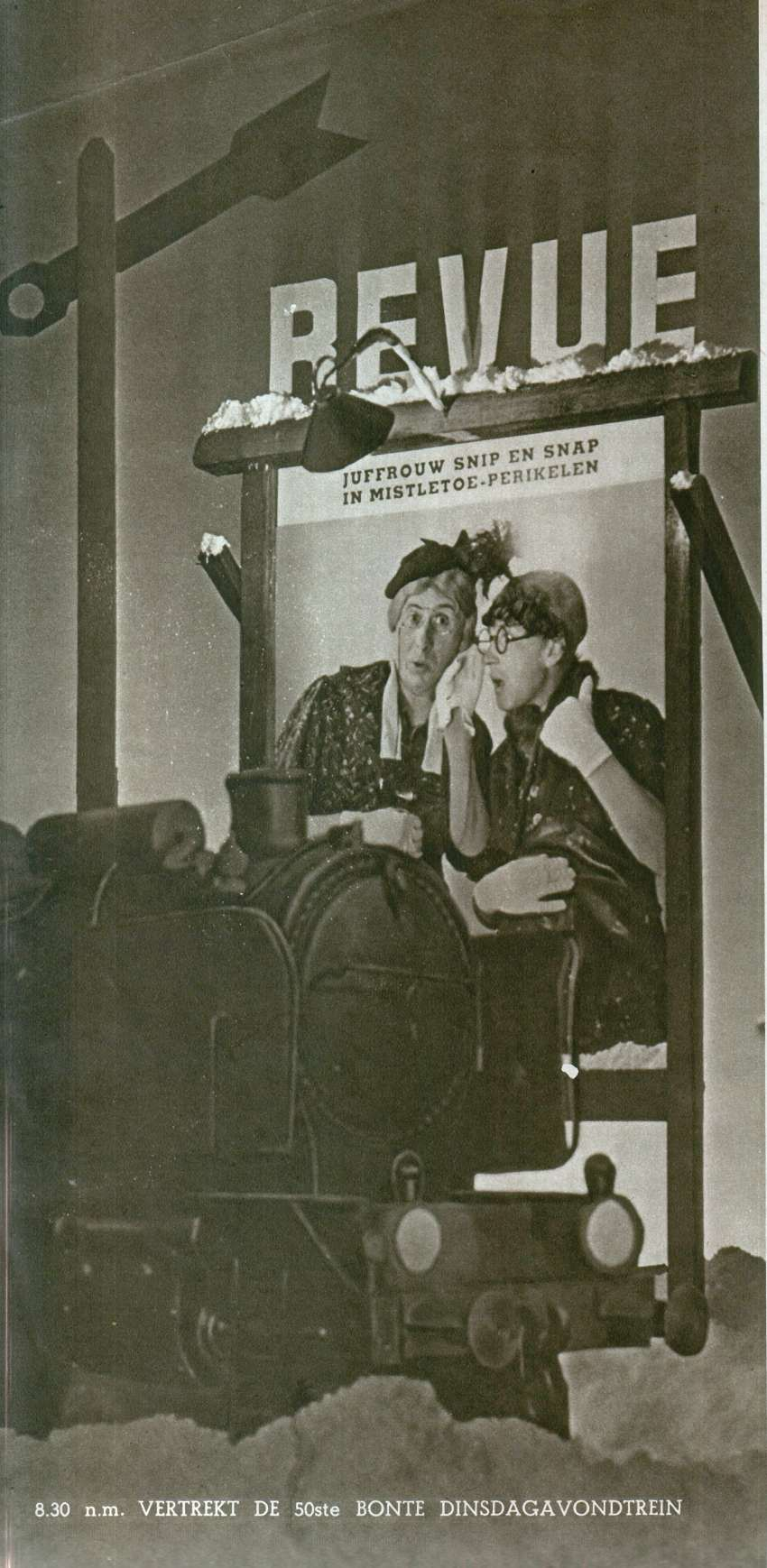
Snip en Snap in a Dutch radio show, 1937

Snip en Snap (or, the Snip en Snap Revue) were a Dutch cabaret act, consisting of Willy Walden and Piet Muijselaar, who performed songs and skits in drag and were active from 1937 to 1977. The act was conceived by Jacques van Tol, who borrowed the concept from Solser en Hesse ("Wip en Snip"). Walden and Muijselaar first appeared as the duo in 1937, on the AVRO radio show De bonte dinsdagavondtrein. Initially planned as a one-time act – for Walden and Muijselaar had no interest in dressing up in women's clothing for the stage, but made an exception for radio – the show was so popular that AVRO engaged them through their agent/producer, Rene Sleeswijk, for a theater tour in which they were the main attraction; after a year the tour (known as the Sleeswijk Revue), which had become more an act showcasing the duo, gained great popularity, and ran for forty years. They continued to perform on De bonte dinsdagavondtrein, which was an immensely popular program; they traveled by train to Hilversum every Tuesday where they were received by a crowd of fans and an orchestra, who accompanied them to the AVRO studio.

== Alumni of the Sleeswijk and Snip en Snap Revue ==
- IJf Blokker
- Corry Brokken (1950s-1960s)
- Anneke Grönloh
- Dick Rienstra (1966-)
- Teddy Scholten
