= The Lift =

1983 film by Dick Maas

- Theatrical release poster
- Directed by: Dick Maas
- Written by: Dick Maas
- Produced by: Matthijs van Heijningen
- Starring: Huub Stapel; Willeke van Ammelrooy; Josine van Dalsum
- Cinematography: Marc Felperlaan
- Edited by: Hans van Dongen
- Music by: Dick Maas
- Production company: Sigma Film Productions
- Distributed by: Tuschinski Film Distribution (Netherlands); Warner Bros. (International)
- Release date: 11 May 1983
- Running time: 99 minutes
- Country: Netherlands
- Language: Dutch
- Budget: $328,000

The Lift (Dutch: De Lift) is a 1983 Dutch science fiction horror film written and directed by Dick Maas. The plot concerns an elevator that mysteriously begins to function intelligently on its own, where victims who go near the elevator or use it are killed.

The film was first released in the Netherlands on 11 May 1983. Warner Bros. acquired the international distribution rights for the film outside the Netherlands and Belgium at Cannes.

An English-language remake was also directed by Maas, titled Down and released in 2001.

== Plot ==
In a building in Amsterdam, an elevator inexplicably begins to function alone. After a lightning storm causes a power failure and traps four people in the elevator, the elevator fails to open even after a subsequent power restore, and the passengers almost suffocate. Soon, subsequent malfunctions prove fatal as an elderly blind man falls to his death when the elevator doors open to an empty shaft, the building night watchman is decapitated, and a janitor is seemingly burned alive.

Felix Adelaar, a technician from the elevator company Deta Liften, begins to examine the electrical system in an attempt to find any anomalies. During the course of several inspections, he meets Mieke de Beer, a journalist for De Nieuwe Revu, a local tabloid. When inspections reveal no apparent problems with the electrical system, Felix becomes obsessed with the continuing malfunctions of the elevator; this has a negative impact on his marriage as his wife Saskia begins to suspect he is having an affair with the journalist. When Felix pays yet another visit to the building, he notices a van parked outside from Rising Sun, a manufacturer of microprocessors for automation and a secret supplier of experimental microprocessors to Deta Liften. Felix and Mieke, after collecting newspaper clippings about Rising Sun, try to meet with the company's CEO, who acts nervous and answers abruptly.

Mieke invites Felix to meet up with her former university professor who specializes in electronics. The professor explains microprocessors' sensitivity to external factors, such as electric fields, magnetic fields, and radioactivity, which undermine the proper functionality. He tells about a computer built years ago which suddenly began to self-program and went out of control. The next morning, Felix's boss angrily suspends him for his unauthorized visit to Rising Sun. That evening, the owners of Deta Liften and Rising Sun meet to discuss how to stop the elevator's computer processor, which is built from organic material, from killing people.

Saskia leaves Felix, taking their children with her. With nothing left to lose, Felix goes to the building to solve the elevator mystery. He discovers that the elevator has a sentient mind when it tries to prevent him from accessing its microprocessor. Instead Felix climbs into the elevator shaft and finds a pulsating box; inside is sticky goo covering a silicon chip—the elevator's heart. As Felix attacks the box with a wrench, the elevator uses its counterweight to knock him off balance. He manages to land on a ledge just below the elevator doors, and is rescued by Mieke just before the elevator is able to crush him.

As Rising Sun's CEO arrives to see that his experiment failed, he pulls out a pistol and fires into the biocomputer to seemingly kill it. The computer then shoots one of the broken cables out to drag him inside the shaft and hangs him. As a shaken Felix and Mieke walk down the stairs the elevator's heartbeat continues.

== Cast ==
- Huub Stapel as Felix Adelaar
- Willeke van Ammelrooy as Mieke de Beer
- Josine van Dalsum as Saskia Adelaar
- Liz Snoyink as Vrouw in Lift
- Wiske Sterringa as Vrouw in Lift
- Agnes Schuch as Werkster
- Arnica Elsendoorn as Schoonzuster
- Carola Gijsbers van Wijk as Maitresse

== Production ==
Dick Maas cited the mixture of humor and horror as reasons for the film's success while also noting the challenges they presented in international distribution since much of the humor witty dialogue and verbal exchanges which don't always translate when viewing dubbed or subtitled versions. Maas also cited that in the Netherlands there's a cultural prejudice against genre films with the local press ignoring them at best or lambasting them at worst and that films such as A Nightmare on Elm Street and Dreamscape aren't normally given much if any distribution.

=== Filming ===
The film was shot at an empty office building in Bijlmermeer, Amsterdam.

== Release ==
=== Critical response ===
Critical reception for The Lift has been mixed: some commended the film for its blending of humor and suspense, while others criticized its execution. Variety in particular praised the film, writing, "Humor from charcoal gray to pitch black, fine suspense, murders and thrills, and all of it without gratuitous gore combine for a jaunty entertainment in The Lift, director Dick Maas' first theatrical test, which he passes handsomely." Dennis Schwartz from Ozus' World Movie Reviews rated the film a grade B−, stating that the film was "Played more for a black comedy than for a corporate greed or menace film."

Janet Maslin of The New York Times was highly critical of the film, calling it "remarkably tension-free", and criticized its execution as being "too tepid". Maslin further stated, "In the hands of the right film maker, of course, even a toaster can be terrifying. But Mr. Maas leaves the elevator's potential fiendishness largely unexploited." Time Out London gave the film a negative review, writing "the movie is shafted by confusions of script and execution, neither of which match up to the original good idea." TV Guide awarded the film two out of five stars, stating that the film was "Surprisingly effective", while also stating that it was not particularly scary.

=== Home media ===
The film was released on Blu-ray in the Netherlands by Dutch FilmWorks on 7 October 2016 as part of the Dick Maas Collectie that includes the director's other films. Maas criticized the set for its color grading and being cut.

The film received a Blu-ray release in North America by Blue Underground on 31 October 2017.

== Accolades ==
Accolades received by The Lift
Year	Award	Category	Recipient(s)	Result	Ref.
1983	Netherlands Film Festival	Golden Calf for Best Director	Dick Maas	Won	
1984	Avoriaz International Fantastic Film Festival	Grand Prix	Dick Maas	Won	
