= Tom & Thomas =

- Theatrical release poster
- Directed by: Esmé Lammers
- Written by: Esmé Lammers
- Produced by: Laurens Geels; Dick Maas
- Starring: Sean Bean; Inday Ba; Derek de Lint; Bill Steward; Sean Harris; Geraldine James; Aaron Johnson
- Cinematography: Marc Felperlaan
- Edited by: Bert Rijkelijkhuizen
- Music by: Paul M. van Brugge
- Production company: First Floor Features
- Distributed by: Buena Vista International
- Release date: 24 January 2002
- Running time: 110 minutes
- Country: Netherlands
- Language: English
- Box office: $233,488

Tom & Thomas (UK title: The Christmas Twins) is a 2002 English-language Dutch family film directed by Esmé Lammers and starring Aaron Johnson in his film debut and Sean Bean. The film was released on 24 January 2002 in the Netherlands.

== Plot ==
A single adoptive father (Sean Bean) cares for one of a set of identical twins (Aaron Johnson) separated years earlier. The two boys meet and have fun together. They come to the attention of a corrupt orphanage manager, and Thomas is kidnapped by the child smugglers. They keep him bound with belts in a warehouse and drug him to keep him asleep. The smugglers plan to transport Thomas to another country by plane, passing him off as an animal in a box where he is kept bound and gagged. Tom learns of this, however, and comes to Thomas's rescue. They are instrumental in smashing the child smuggling ring.

== Cast ==
- Aaron Johnson as Tom & Thomas
- Sean Bean as Paul Sheppard
- Inday Ba as Celia Scofield
- Derek de Lint as Mr. Bancroft
- Geraldine James as Miss Tromp
- Victoria Hasted as Miss Hogan

== Production ==
=== Casting ===
Tom & Thomas gained initial media interest through its illusive casting auditions. The auditions took place across the UK and the Netherlands, and resulted in a final casting session held in London, UK. The eventual winners were Tom and Alex Dawes, twins from the Midlands who are more generally known for their guest appearance in Nickelodeon's TV adaptation of Jacqueline Wilson's Double Act. However, after being accepted for the roles, the pair were rejected in favour of Johnson as loss of funding cut the cast in half. After a brief conflict between the Dawes twins and Lammers, which resulted in the pair gaining UK rights to the title "Tom & Thomas", the matter was settled with an undisclosed settlement. The Dawes twins have not been involved in any acting since, and now both hold positions at the University of Oxford.

=== Filming ===
Filming took place in London, Amsterdam, and Haarlem from December 2000 to July 20, 2001. In London, despite high costs and strict local regulations, street scenes were shot to give the film an international flavor. In Haarlem, at the Kenau Park, a winter atmosphere was recreated at the end of May using artificial snow and set decorations to convey a Christmas mood.

The main filming took place in the following locations:

- London Southbank (UK), scene where the two boys mock about throwing snowballs.
- Notting Hill (UK), where Sean Bean and Aaron Johnson get in the car.
- Haarlem (NL), is where the Thomas' school scenes were shot.
- Amstelveen (NL), is where Tom and Thomas obtain their corduroy denim jacket with orange hooded sweaters. Amsterdam RAI (NL), was turned into Heathrow departures.
- Noordwijk (NL), was where the museum scenes were shot.
- Ghent (BL), that's where the orphanage scenes were shot.
- Schiphol airport, where Transavia allowed the crew to use their hangar.

== Reviews ==
The film received mixed reviews from critics. The strengths of the picture were cited as the acting of young Aaron Johnson, who brilliantly handled the role of two different characters, and Sean Bean, who brought emotional depth to the film. Technical aspects, including filming in the mirror maze and the chase scenes, also received positive feedback. However, critics also noted the film's weaknesses. The plot was criticized for its predictability and use of clichés standard for family films, such as orphans in a snowy night and villains threatening children. The dark tone of some scenes raised questions about their appropriateness for a younger audience.

== Release ==
Initially, the film was planned for release in February 2002 to avoid competition with major Christmas releases such as Harry Potter and the Philosopher's Stone and Miss Minoes.

The film premiered on 20 January 2002 in Scheveningen (Netherlands) at the Pathé cinema. The premiere was attended by Aaron Johnson, Sean Harris, Bill Stewart, and Derek de Lint.

The North American premiere took place at the Sprockets children's film festival (Toronto) in April 2002.

=== Home media ===
The film was released on DVD and VHS in the Netherlands on 20 November 2002 by Buena Vista Home Entertainment through the Hollywood Pictures Home Video label.

== Accolades ==
- 2002 — the best international film on Chicago International Children's Film Festival.
