= Huub Stapel =

Dutch actor (born 1954)

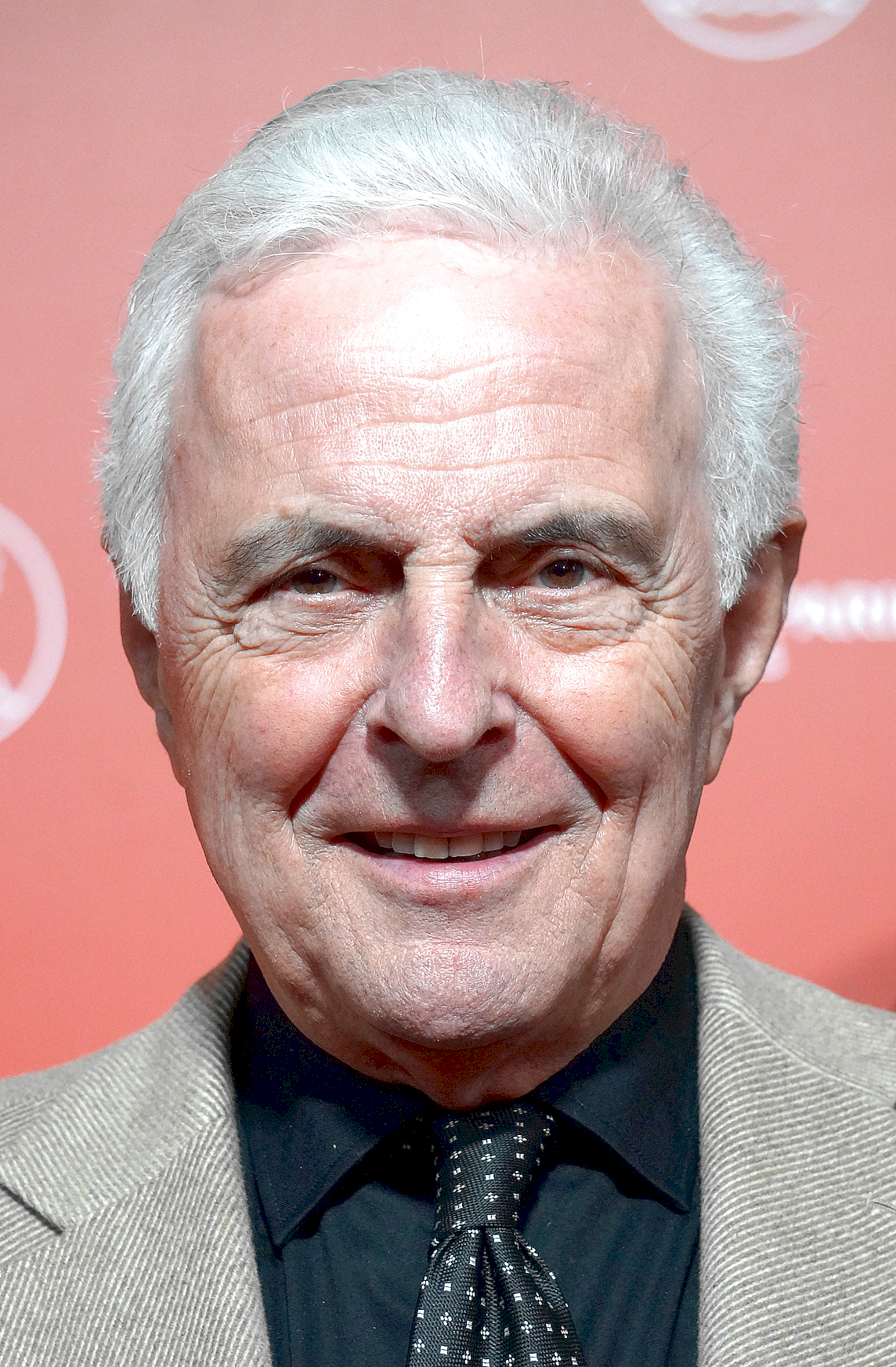
- Stapel at 2026 Ostend Film Festival
- Born: Hubertus Wijnandus Jozef Marie Stapel; December 2, 1954 (age 71); Tegelen, Netherlands
- Occupation: Actor
- Known for: Flodder; Amsterdamned; De Lift

Hubertus Wijnandus Jozef Marie (Huub) Stapel (born 2 December 1954, in Tegelen) is a Dutch actor. He is especially known from the films The Lift (1983), Flodder (1986) and Amsterdamned (1988) by Dick Maas. He also appeared in the Golden Earring video When the Lady Smiles.

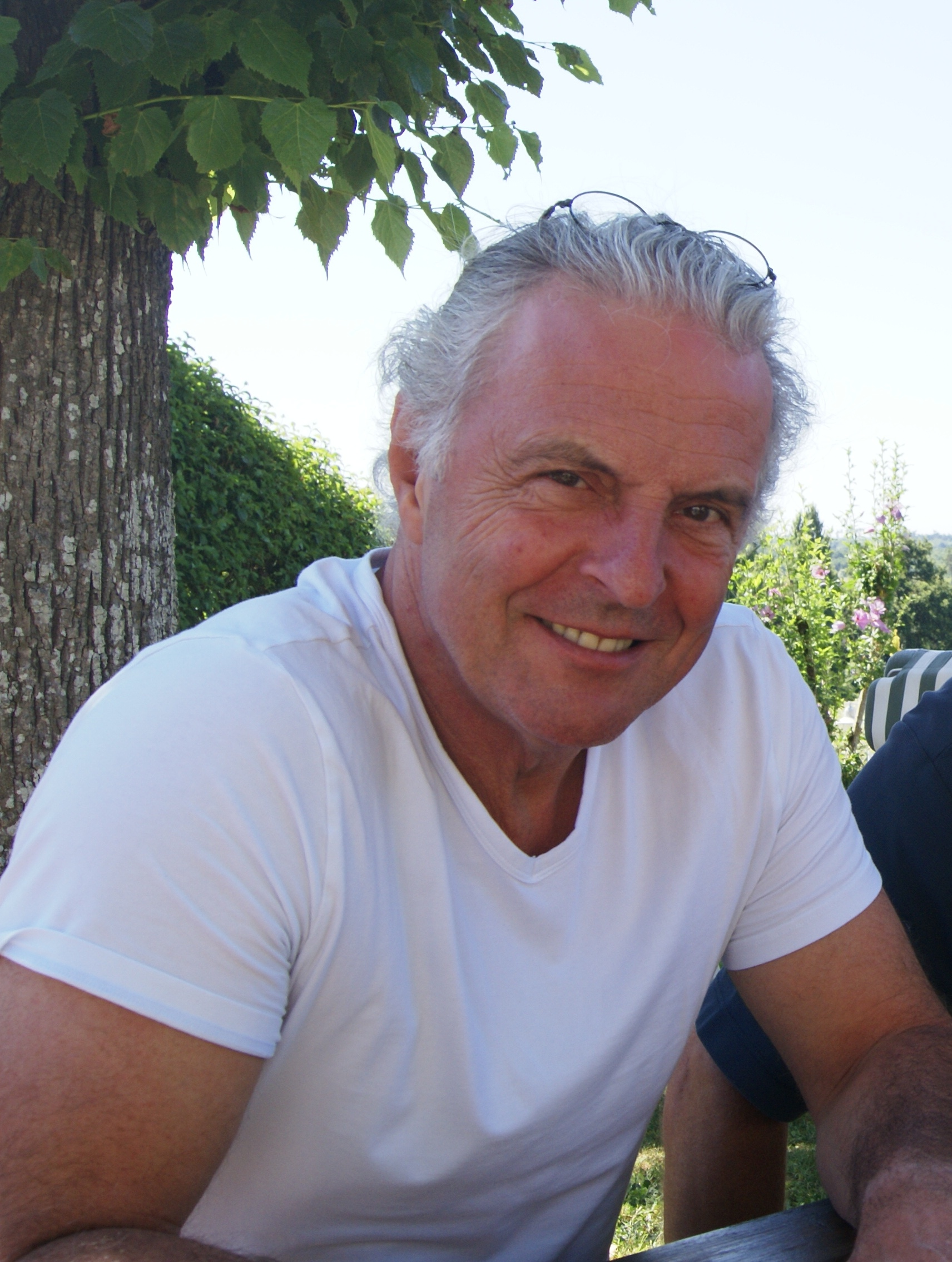
Stapel in 2015

== Filmography ==
=== Dutch productions ===
- Champagne (2026)
- Amsterdamned II (2025) - Eric Visser
- Eén grote familie (2023) - Ger Smeets
- Ferry (2021)
- Redbad (2018)
- De Zevende Hemel (2016) - Max
- Zwarte Tulp (2015) - Luuk Vonk
- Goedenavond dames en heren (2015) - Benno
- Hemel op aarde (2013) - Father Sef Janzen
- A Perfect Man (2013) - Pieter
- Moeder, ik wil bij de Revue (2012) - Jacob Somers
- Bellicher:Cel (2012) - Steiner
- De Goede Dood (2012) - Michael
- Hard tegen Hard (2011) - Ben Berendsen
- U & Eye (2011) - Carpenter
- Titten (2011)
- Sint (2010) - Saint Nicholas
- Iep! (2010) - Warre
- The Dark House (2009)- Victor
- Het Wapen van Geldrop (2008) - Piet Veerman
- Alles is Liefde (2007) - himself
- Flikken Maastricht television series - Geert Veldkamp (Afl., Kogelvis, 2007)
- SEXtet (2007) - Bram
- Oberon television series - C (2005)
- Johan (2005) - Rinus Dros
- The Preacher (De Dominee) (2004) - Anton Donkers
- Klem in de draaideur (2003) - Dato Steenhuis
- Verder dan de maan (2003) - Mees Werner sr.
- Godforsaken (Van God Los) (2003) - Herbert Meijer
- De vloer op television series - several parts (sinds 2002)
- 'n Stukje humor (2002) - Gerard
- Het achterland (television film, 2001) - Alex
- De Nacht van Aalbers (television film, 2001) - unknown
- Loenatik televisieserie - Automonteur (Afl., De milieuactie, 2001)
- Dial 9 for Love (2001) - Pieter
- Wet & Waan television series - Herman Vlieger (10 episodes in season 1, 2000 & 10 episodes in season 2, 2003)
- Oh oh Den Haag television series - Wim van Tol (2000)
- Rent a Friend (2000) - Mr. Bloedworst
- Retour Den Haag (television film, 1999) - Ed. van Thijn
- Flodder television series - Paolo (Afl., Egotrip, 1998)
- Mortinho por chegar a casa (1996) - Joris
- De Zeemeerman (1996) - Timo Babel
- Walhalla (1995) - Raymond de Feyter
- De Partizanen (Mini series, 1995) - Hendrik
- Hoffman's honger (1993) - Baruch Spinoza
- Oog in oog television series - Peter Gubbels (Afl. onbekend, 1992)
- Flodder in Amerika! (1992) - Johnnie Flodder
- Sjans television series - Sjaak Massini (1992–1993)
- Oh Boy! (1991) - Boy in sports café
- De onfatsoenlijke vrouw (1991) - Leon
- Amsterdamned (1988) - Eric Visser
- Het Twentsch Paradijs (television film, 1988)
- Flodder (1986) - Johnnie Flodder
- Op hoop van zegen (1986) - Geert
- Maria (1986) - Paolo Pietrosanti
- De Dream (1985) - Inspector of police
- De Schorpioen (1984) - Standard-bearer
- The Lift (1983) - Felix Adelaar
- De Zwarte Ruiter (1983) - Floor
- De Weg (television series 1983) - Jan Nieuwenhuis
- Willem van Oranje (mini series, 1983), remake of the 1934 film Willem van Oranje - François-Hercule de Valois
- Van de koele meren des doods (1982) - Herman
- Het meisje met het rode haar (1981) - NSB member

=== German productions ===
- Ice Fever (2010) - Harry Mac
- My Heart in Chile (TV film, 2008) - Herbert Hansen
- Alarm für Cobra 11 - Die Autobahnpolizei (TV series, episode: Auf eigene Faust, 2008) - Sander Kalvus
- Donna Roma (TV series, 4 episodes, 2007) - Konstantin
- Verrückt nach Clara (TV series, 7 episodes, 2007) - Bernd
- Unter Verdacht (TV series, episode: Ein neues Leben, 2006) - Stewens
- M.E.T.R.O. – Ein Team auf Leben und Tod (TV series, episode: Krim-Kongo, 2006) - Magnus van Royen
- SOKO Kitzbühel (TV series, episode: Magischer Mord, 2006) - Henrik van Huisen
- Sperling (TV series, episode: Sperling und der Fall Wachutka, 2005) - Johan Kerkman
- The Best Year of My Life (TV film, 2005) - Niklas Vandenberg
- The Other Woman (TV film, 2004) - Henk
- Das Duo (TV series, episode: Im falschen Leben, 2002) - Helmut Felser
- Auf Herz und Nieren (2001) - Nemeth
- Auf schmalem Grat (TV film, 2000) - Joachim Behrens
- Late Show (1999) - Bank manager
- Tatort (TV series, episode: Offene Rechnung, 1999) - Uli Lischka
- Ein starkes Team (TV series, episode: Braunauge, 1999) - Milan Petkowicz
- Die Neue – Eine Frau mit Kaliber (TV series, episode: Stille Nacht, tödliche Nacht, 1998) - Vandeberg
- Hauptsache Leben (TV film, 1998) - Dominik
- Kai Rabe gegen die Vatikankiller (1998) - Karl Bresser
- Widows – Erst die Ehe, dann das Vergnügen (1998) - Konrad Sommer
- Eine ungehorsame Frau (TV film, 1998) - David
- Knockin' on Heaven's Door (1997) - Frankie 'Boy' Beluga
- Der Schutzengel (TV film, 1997) - Peter Becker
- Stockinger (TV series, episode: Undschuldslämmer, 1996) - Dr. Paolo van Voorst
- Zockerexpress (1991) - Dany
- In the Shadow of the Sandcastle (1990) - unknown
- Die Kurve kriegen (1985) - Jan

=== Flemish productions ===
- Oh no! It's a woman. (2010, film)
- Windkracht 10 (serie, 1997-1998) - Sergeant Dirk de Groot (diver in first series)

=== French production ===
- Vertige pour un tueur (1970) - unknown

=== US production ===
- The Attic: The Hiding of Anne Frank (television film, 1988) - Jan Gies

== Theatre ==
- Napoleon on St. Helena - Napoleon Bonaparte
- Harold & Maude
- Vrijen [stichting D.R.A.M.]
- Onder het Melkwoud [stichting D.R.A.M]
- Moordspel [with Ton Lensink]
- Democraten (as Willy Brandt)
- Eten met vrienden (for this part he was nominated for a Louis d'Or)
- Mephisto
- Kentering van een huwelijk
- Art [with Victor Löw & Sjoerd Pleijsier]
- Mannen komen van Mars, Vrouwen van Venus
- De Kus (2010) (with Carine Crutzen)

== Television programmes ==
- Stapel op auto's
- Stapel in de States
- Oberon (reality series by TROS & Eén) as the counselor
- Stapel op Werk (for Limburgish television)
- Het Gesprek, S.T.A.P.E.L (2007)
- De vloer op (2005)
- Nina Nazarova aan de top! (2010)
