= Walhalla (film) =

1995 film by Eddy Terstall

- DVD cover
- Directed by: Eddy Terstall
- Distributed by: Concorde Film
- Release date: 8 June 1995
- Countries: Netherlands, Belgium
- Language: Dutch

Walhalla is a 1995 Belgian and Dutch thriller film directed by Eddy Terstall.

== Cast ==
- Marc van Uchelen ... Michel de Feyter
- Huub Stapel ... Raymond de Feyter
- Antje de Boeck ... Sanne

== See also ==
- 1995 in film
