= Flodder =

1986 film by Dick Maas

- Theatrical release poster
- Directed by: Dick Maas
- Screenplay by: Dick Maas
- Produced by: Laurens Geels; Dick Maas
- Starring: Nelly Frijda; Huub Stapel; Tatjana Šimić; René van 't Hof; Horace Cohen; Nani Lehnhausen; Jan Willem Hees
- Cinematography: Marc Felperlaan
- Edited by: Hans van Dongen
- Music by: Dick Maas
- Production company: First Floor Features
- Distributed by: Concorde Film
- Release date: 17 December 1986
- Running time: 111 minutes
- Country: Netherlands
- Language: Dutch
- Budget: $1.7 million
- Box office: 2.3 million admissions (Netherlands)

Flodder is a 1986 Dutch comedy film written and directed by Dick Maas, and produced by First Floor Features. It is the first film in the Flodder franchise and is followed by two more films and a spin-off series. The film follows an anti-social, dysfunctional family who move to an affluent, upper-class neighbourhood as part of a social experiment which results in mayhem as the Flodder family refuses to adapt.

Flodder's broad humour and politically incorrect satire ridiculing the Dutch welfare state resulted in mixed reviews, but was the most popular Dutch film of the year and one of the top 10 of all time with 2.3 million admissions. It still attracts a cult following, and in 2007 it was admitted to the Canon van de Nederlandse Film. Flodder is also a Dutch word meaning blank cartridge, a referral to the Flodders looking dangerous and being noisy, despite being rather harmless.

== Plot ==
When it emerges that the Flodder family's current state-owned house is on a toxic waste dump, the city council is forced to find somewhere to move them. Social worker Sjakie, proposes to move the family to an upper-class neighbourhood hoping that the change in social environment will have a positive effect on the problematic family.

However the family fails to adapt and persists in their anti-social lifestyle which clashes with the values of the reserved upper class inhabitants of the neighbourhood, who try everything in their power to get rid of the Flodders. This results in several confrontations between individual members of the family and the upper class inhabitants.

The town council, being aware of the problems the family is causing, starts looking into alternative living accommodations, although Sjakie keeps insisting that the family should be given another chance. In the meantime son Johnny starts a relationship with neighbour Yolanda Kruisman, much to the fury of her husband.

This culminates at a neighbourhood meeting being held to discuss how to get rid of the family. Johnny and Yolanda walk in announcing their engagement. They decide to throw a party where everyone is invited. Meanwhile, the town council finds a suitable alternative house for the family, but Ma Flodder discovers she has inherited a large sum of money from Opa Flodder who recently died in a train accident. With the money she decides to buy the house in which they are living. The climax of the film is the engagement party, which is attended by everyone and quickly gets out of hand; the people from the neighbourhood however have a great time and finally start to appreciate the family as they are. In the meantime, Yolanda's husband goes to the army base where he works and takes one of the army tanks. In the finale of the film he destroys the house of the Flodders who take it with good humour.

== Cast ==
- Nelly Frijda as Ma Flodder
- Huub Stapel as son Johnny Flodder
- René van 't Hof as son Kees Flodder
- Tatjana Šimić as daughter Kees Flodder
- Lou Landré as Jacques "Sjakie" van Kooten
- Jan Willem Hees as grandpa Flodder
- Nani Lehnhausen as Toet Flodder
- Horace Cohen as Henkie Flodder
- Herbert Flack as Kolonel Wim Kruisman
- Apollonia van Ravenstein as Yolanda Kruisman
- Bert André as Neighbour Ed Neuteboom
- Lettie Oosthoek as Neighbour Tilly Neuteboom

== Release ==
After the film's successful Dutch release, United International Pictures acquired the international rights of the film for worldwide distribution outside the Netherlands and Japan. While the film retained its title in most English-speaking territories, the Canadian English-language release was called Welfare Party.

=== Reception ===
Although reasonably well reviewed, the film was considered controversial at the time, but has since gained cult status. It was the most popular Dutch film of the year with 2.3 million admissions. It was admitted to the Canon van de Nederlandse Film in 2007. In 1987 it won a Golden Calf for best director.

=== Accolades ===
Accolades received by Flodder
Year	Award	Category	Recipient(s)	Result	Ref.
1987	Netherlands Film Festival	Golden Calf for Best Director	Dick Maas	Won	

== Sequels ==
The film was followed by two sequels, Flodder in Amerika (1992) and Flodder 3 (1995). A spin-off television series ran from 1993 to 1999.

== Québec version ==
The film was shown in Québec in Canada, where it was dubbed into joual (a working class Québec French dialect) under the title Les Lavigueur déménagent ("The Lavigueurs Are Moving") where it has a cult following. The name Lavigueur was taken from a Montreal working-class family who had made headlines in 1986 after winning what was then the largest jackpot ever awarded in a Canadian lottery, at 6/49. The family—except for Yve Lavigueur—attempted to sue the filmmakers, but they could do nothing as nobody owns a particular last name, especially a popular one. Yve, on the other hand, went to the premiere, and was disappointed when he realised that the film had nothing to do with his family. He thought that a film about his family would be a good thing, when, in fact, it was done to mock them.

== See also ==
- Tokkie
- Beverly Hillbillies
