= The Mozart Bird =

1993 film

De Mozart Bird
- Directed by: Aryan Kaganof
- Written by: Daniel Daran, Stacey Grace
- Release date: September 9, 1993
- Country: Netherlands
- Language: Dutch

The Mozart Bird or De Mozart Bird is a 1993 Dutch romantic drama film directed by Aryan Kaganof.

== Cast ==
- Stacey Grace ... Selene
- Daniel Daran ... Howard
- Rosalind George
- Gabrielle Provaas
