= Oh Boy! (1991 film) =

- Theatrical release poster
- Directed by: Orlow Seunke
- Written by: Orlow Seunke
- Produced by: Laurens Geels; Dick Maas
- Starring: Orlow Seunke; Kees van Kooten; Monique Smets
- Cinematography: Marc Felperlaan
- Edited by: Hans van Dongen; Orlow Seunke
- Music by: Maarten Koopman
- Production company: First Floor Features
- Distributed by: Concorde Film
- Release date: 8 May 1991
- Running time: 88 minutes
- Country: Netherlands
- Language: Dutch

Oh Boy! is a 1991 Dutch comedy film written, directed and starring Orlow Seunke and produced by Laurens Geels and Dick Maas. The film follows a disorganized film crew filming a Buster Keaton-style comedy film about two rivaling gas station owners. It was released on 8 May 1991.

== Cast ==
- Orlow Seunke as Boy / Pim
- Kees van Kooten as Bozz / Gert
- Monique Smets as Gal / Chloe
- Steffen Kroon as Sonny
- Jim van der Woude as Wheelchairman
- Pier van Brakel as Boer
- Huub Stapel as Jongen in Sportcafe
- Peer Mascini as Director
- Tom Jansen as Producer
- Marc Didden as Cameraman
- Job van As as Cameraman
- Ingrid van Alphen as Scriptgirl
- Willy van der Griendt as Grimeuse / Stoot
- Flip Filz as Opnameleider
- Bart Witteveen as Rekwisiteur
