= My Blue Heaven (1990 Dutch film) =

1992 Dutch film by

- Theatrical release poster
- Directed by: Ronald Beer
- Written by: Ronald Beer
- Produced by: Laurens Geels; Dick Maas
- Starring: Ruud de Wolff; Ivon Pelasula; Koen Wauters
- Cinematography: Marc Felperlaan
- Edited by: Hans van Dongen
- Music by: Dick Maas
- Production company: First Floor Features
- Distributed by: Cannon Tuschinski Film Distribution
- Release date: 21 December 1990
- Running time: 95 minutes
- Country: Netherlands
- Language: Dutch

My Blue Heaven is a 1990 Dutch drama film written and directed by Ronald Beer.

== Plot ==
After the former Dutch East Indies gain their independence, many Indonesians of Dutch descent emigrate to the Netherlands. The Benoit family decides to open an Indonesian restaurant. The Indos are unpopular with the local Dutch people, who consider them to be lazy and stupid. At first, the restaurant's opening is received with ridicule, but when it begins to attract customers, thereby threatening the local snack bar, people start getting more hostile. To make matters worse, the snack bar owner's son falls in love with the Benoit family's Indonesian daughter.

== Cast ==
- Ruud de Wolff as Paatje
- Ivon Pelasula as Brenda Benoit
- Koen Wauters as Hans van de Broeck
- Bo Bojoh as Maatje
- Leen Jongewaard as Vader van de Broeck
- Michel Sorbach as Boetie
- Angélique Corneille as Bella
- Remco Djojosepoetro as Hannies
- Victor Reinier as Mickey
- Con Meyer as Meyer
- Edda Barends as Mw. Van de Broeck
- Bert Luppes as Leen
- Tatjana Simic as Suzy
- Julius Wendrich as Ko
- Carola Gijsbers van Wijk as Mrs. Koopmans
