= Een dubbeltje te weinig =

1991 film by André van Duren

- Theatrical release poster
- Directed by: André van Duren
- Written by: Peter van Gestel
- Produced by: Harry Hemink; Hans de Weers
- Cinematography: Dirk Teenstra
- Edited by: Gys Zevenbergen
- Music by: Harry Bannink
- Production companies: First Floor Features; NCRV
- Distributed by: The Movies
- Release date: 1991
- Running time: 72 minutes
- Country: Netherlands
- Language: Dutch

Een dubbeltje te weinig ("A dubbeltje too little") is a 1991 Dutch film directed by André van Duren and written by Peter van Gestel. It was released internationally under the title A Penny Too Short.

== Cast ==
- Boris Rodenko ... Jop
- Dokus Dagelet ... Ankie
- Henriëtte Tol ... To Ruif
- Hans Hoes ... Jaap Omvlee
- Kees Hulst ... Jan Ruif
- Johan Ooms ... Johannes Pieterman
- Wim Kouwenhoven ... Joris Donker
- Han Römer ... Ambtenaar sociale zaken
- Hammy de Beukelaer ... Kastelein
- Lettie Oosthoek ... Moeder van To
- Jan Wegter ... Vader van To
- Ottolien Boeschoten ... Vriendin van To
- Con Meyer ... Fietsenmaker
- Marijon Luitjes ... Verjaardagsgaste
- Gwen Eckhaus ... Verjaardagsgaste
