= Ivanhood =

1992 film

- Directed by: Paul Ruven
- Release date: 1992
- Running time: 70 minutes
- Country: Netherlands
- Language: Dutch

Ivanhood is a 1992 Dutch comedy film directed by Paul Ruven.

== Cast ==
- Christo van Klaveren ... Ivanhood
- Maike Meijer ... Eerste Vrouw
- Odette van der Molen ... Slanore
- Fabienne Meershoek ... Vrouw in kerker
- Joy Hoes ... Vrouw in bad
- Carine Korteweg ... Robijn
- Gusta Geleynse ... Weddenschap-vrouw 1 (as Gusta Geleijnse)
- Jolien Wanninkhof ... Weddenschap-vrouw 2
- Annemarike Ruitenbeek ... Eerste koerier
- Alice Reys ... Saffier
- Willemijn van der Ree ... Zwangere koerie
