= Flodder (TV series) =

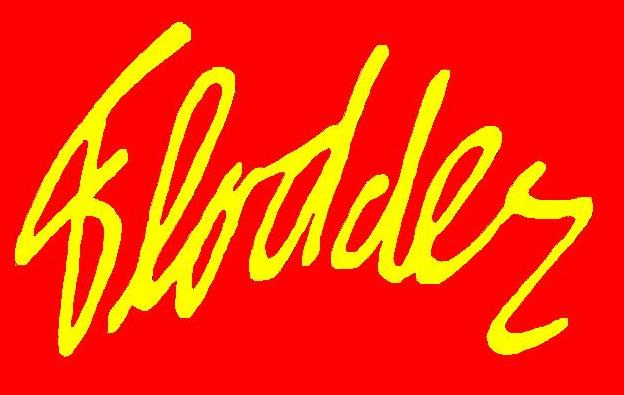
- Genre: Comedy
- Created by: Dick Maas
- Based on: The movie Flodder
- Directed by: Dick Maas; Wijo Koek; Others
- Starring: Nelly Frijda; Coen van Vrijberghe de Coningh; Tatjana Šimić; Stefan de Walle; Herman Passchier; Lou Landré
- Composers: Dick Maas; Peter Schon
- Country of origin: Netherlands
- Original language: Dutch
- No. of seasons: 5
- No. of episodes: 62

Production
- Executive producer: Laurens Geels
- Production location: Almere
- Editor: Bert Rijkelijkhuizen
- Running time: 25 minutes
- Production company: First Floor Features

Original release
- Network: Veronica TV
- Release: 7 October 1993 – 17 March 1999

Flodder is a Dutch comedy series about the criminal family Flodder as they are given government-provided housing in the high-class district of Zonnedael, that aired from 1993 to 1999.

The series is based on the movie trilogy of the same name. Though the storylines of the series, while following the same characters, are separate from the movies.

In november 2024 media expert Tina Nijkamp and production company NewBe announced the production of a new spin-off called Kees Flodder about the family's daughter of the same name.

== Background ==
For the production of the series, a set of eight complete villas including roads was built in Almere at the studio First Floor Factory. The character of Grandpa (Opa) Flodder, which dies in the first movie, returned for the TV series and most of the other movie cast returned to reprise their roles in the series.

Initially the series would run for three seasons, so that the final of the series would coincide with the release of the third and final movie of the trilogy. But thanks to the immense success of both movies and TV series, TV network Veronica asked for a continuation. Filming resumed in 1997. Three days after filming concluded, starring actor Coen van Vrijberghe de Coningh suddenly passed away during a company party which he attended with Šimić and De Walle, meaning the definitive end of the series. Veronica aired the final two seasons of the show in 1998 and 1999.
