= Moutarde van Sonansee =

- Directed by: Toon Hermans
- Release date: 1959
- Running time: 94 minutes
- Country: Netherlands
- Language: Dutch

Moutarde van Sonansee is a 1959 Dutch comedy film directed by Toon Hermans.

== Cast ==
- Gerard Doting as Notaris, [probably someone not as important as Dineke Poster playing Girl in Background]
- Henk Haye as Boekhouder
- Toon Hermans as Jeep Moutarde
- Phyllis Lane as Dr. Helen Ford
- Linda Op 't Eynde as Lilly
- Johan te Slaa as Worstfabrikant
- Swen Smeele as Meneer Plu
- Mary van den Berg as Juffrouw Duif
- Jan van der Horst as Pastoor
- Kees Verkade as Vriend van Lilly
- Dineke Poster as Girl in Background
- Lia van Kemenade as Other Girl in Background
