= Flodder 3 =

- Theatrical release poster
- Directed by: Dick Maas
- Written by: Dick Maas; Wijo Koek
- Produced by: Laurens Geels; Dick Maas
- Starring: Nelly Frijda; Coen van Vrijberghe de Coningh; Stefan de Walle; Tatjana Simić; Herman Passchier; Scarlett Heuer; Sander Swart; Lou Landré
- Cinematography: Philip Hering
- Edited by: Hans van Dongen
- Music by: Dick Maas
- Production company: First Floor Features
- Distributed by: Concorde Entertainment Group
- Release date: 29 June 1995
- Running time: 125 minutes
- Country: Netherlands
- Language: Dutch
- Budget: 7.5M NLG ($5M)
- Box office: $3.1 million (Netherlands)

Flodder 3 (alternative titles: Flodder Forever or Flodder: The Final Story) is a 1995 Dutch comedy film directed by Dick Maas. It is the third and last film about the anti-social family, called 'Flodder'. The film is a continuation of the TV series and the previous two films. Different from the first two films, son Kees is now played by actor Stefan de Walle, and Johnnie Flodder is now played by Coen van Vrijberghe de Coningh, the same actor as in the TV series. It was the second most popular Dutch film of the year.

== Plot ==
Living in Zonnedael for a while now, the Flodder family continues their usual antisocial behaviour; Ma Flodder regularly gets in trouble with the neighbors, her sons Johnnie and Kees are on welfare and spend their time supplementing their income with petty crime. Daughter Kees acts rather promiscuously and the youngest children Toet and Henkie commit extreme mischief (bordering on vandalism) around the neighborhood, often involving their older grandpa in their acts. The family's dog Whisky is vicious and aggressive and loud parties keep the neighbors awake.

As celebrations for the 25th anniversary of Zonnedael draw closer, the organisers of the festivities, fearing that the Flodder family will ruin the party, grow more and more desperate and uses every method they can think of to get rid of them. One of them uses his daughter Mirjam to spy on Sjakie, the civil servant who aids the family on the government's behalf. In doing so they discover that in order for the Flodders to stay in Zonnedael the government has set up some official terms. For example, criminal activities and family expansion are prohibited and upon learning this, chairman Van Brandwijk in particular tries to come up with whatever he can to force the family to leave. In the midst of this all Ma Flodder gets romantically involved with a homeless person.

At first they try to frame the Flodders for stealing cars by having a nephew drive one of their cars to the Flodder residence and then calling the police, saying their car was stolen. The plan fails when son Kees Flodder discovers the car in front of his home and decides to take a ride in it. While driving he hears the sound of approaching police sirens and quickly parks the car on the driveway of the closest residence, unbeknownst to him, this residence happens to be owned by the original owner of the car, therefore making it look like the car was never stolen in the first place.

A second plan is set in motion and involves accusing daughter Kees of illegal prostitution. A call is made to Kees, promising a role as a prostitute in an adult movie. The same nephew from the first plan goes to pick her up but drops her off at a red light district instead of a movie set, where Van Brandwijk is waiting with a video camera to try and capture incriminating evidence. When daughter Kees tries to hitch a ride home, it would then appear as if she is soliciting. However this plan fails as well when it becomes clear that the person offering her a ride turns out to be the accountant of the festival committee, whom they obviously do not want to discredit.

The third plan involves trying to catch the Flodder family on the count of family expansion. The committee tracks down a man who is presumably the father of daughter Kees and promises him to help clean up his criminal past if he agrees to move in with the Flodder family to help frame them. A story is concocted that the man inherited a large fortune, which upon hearing, makes family member Johnnie well receptive to the fact of his long lost stepfather returning. Ma Flodder however, kicks the man out the door because she decided long ago that she never wanted to see the man again. Immediately after, she announces her engagement with the homeless person. This announcement turns out favorably for Van Brandwijk's plan.

Meanwhile, Sjakie finds out Mirjam's true intentions and upon learning about the term about the ban on family expansion, tries to stop the marriage between Ma Flodder and the homeless person. His efforts are to no avail, since Ma Flodder wants to marry anyway. At the last moment, during the wedding ceremony, it becomes clear that the homeless person already has two children who are now at the ceremony protesting the marriage. At this point it is revealed that the man is not really homeless, but in fact a billionaire. Ma Flodder feels betrayed and dumps her fiancée on the spot.

In all the commotion that follows, Sjakie forgets to arrange the rental payments on the house in time and the Flodders are under threat of being evicted. They gather all their friends and a massive fight ensues between them on one side and the rest of the neighborhood and the police on the other. Sjakie shows up and makes the announcement that the Flodders are not evicted until their house is sold, which eventually ends the fight. On top of that he has managed to arrange subsidy to bid on the house on behalf of the city council.

When the house is put up for sale in a public auction, Van Brandwijk desperately tries to outbid Sjakie. This leads to a lot of annoyance among the other members of the festival committee who have grown tired of Van Brandwijk's obsession to drive out the Flodders from the area. Eventually, the house is bought by Ma Flodder's ex-fiancée, who gives the house back to the Flodder family, thereby ensuring that there is no more legal avenue to get the Flodders evicted.

As the Flodders (including Sjakie, who is now romantically involved with Mirjam) celebrate their victory that night, Van Brandwijk is thrown out of the committee. This causes him to engage in more drastic measures and he steals a fuel truck, and tries to drive it directly into the home of the Flodders. At the very last moment the truck collides with grandpa's wheelchair (who turns out to be able to walk after all and escapes just in time) missing the Flodder residence and hitting the adjacent house. A chain reaction of events is set in motion, partially caused by all the decorations across town in preparation for Zonnedael's anniversary, causing the entire town to burn down. With the exception of the home of the Flodder family, which was not decorated for the festival at all.

== Cast ==
- Nelly Frijda as Ma Flodder
- Coen van Vrijberghe de Coningh as Johnnie Flodder
- Stefan de Walle as Kees Flodder
- Tatjana Šimić as Kees Flodder
- Sander Swart as Henkie Flodder
- Scarlett Heuer as Toet Flodder
- Herman Passchier as Opa
- Lou Landré as Jacques 'Sjakie' van Kooten
- Hugo Metsers as Pa Flodder
- Bert André as Buurman Neuteboom
- Lettie Oosthoek as Buurvrouw Neuteboom
- Alfred van den Heuvel as Van Brandwijk
- Marloes van den Heuvel as Mevrouw Vonk
- Wim Van den Heuvel as Zakenman
- Caya de Groot as Mirjam

== Filming ==
The film was recorded directly after the third season of the TV serial from September to November 1994 and is a combination of three considered scenarios which were originally intended for episodes of the TV series. 1997 marked the final ending of Flodder, when Coen van Vrijberghe de Coningh died unexpectedly due to a heart attack at a private party at the Flodder Studio's in Almere, where the round-off of seasons four and five was being celebrated, which eventually caused the discontinuation of the entire series.

In 2014, director Dick Maas released "Flodder 3 - The Making of", a short clip that features previously unreleased footage and is narrated by van Vrijberghe de Coningh. Maas released the clip for free on YouTube.

== See also ==
- Flodder
- Flodder in Amerika
