= Han de Wit =

1990 film

- Directed by: Joost Ranzijn
- Written by: Heere Heeresma (novel), Joost Ranzijn
- Cinematography: Lex Wertwijn
- Edited by: Herman P. Koerts
- Distributed by: Concorde Film
- Release date: 16 February 1990
- Running time: 90 minutes
- Country: Netherlands
- Language: Dutch

Han de Wit is a 1990 Dutch drama film directed by Joost Ranzijn.

== Cast ==
- Koen De Bouw as Han de Wit
- Nelly Frijda as Moeder
- Jim van der Woude as Vader
- Jaloe Maat as Nellie
- Huub van der Lubbe as Zeeman
- Hans Beijer as Boekhouder
- Kees Hulst as Dokter
- Leny Breederveld as Dokter
- Hans Trentelman as Dokter
- Mimi Kok as Psychiater
- Patrick Muller as Blinde Douwe
- Sonja Paal as Buurvrouw
- Han Kerkhoffs as Brillenverkoper
- Ria Marks as Verpleegster Skelet
- Annette Nijder as Verpleegster
