= Resistance (2003 film) =

- Theatrical release poster
- Directed by: Todd Komarnicki
- Written by: Todd Komarnicki; Anita Shreve
- Based on: Resistance by Anita Shreve
- Produced by: Laurens Geels
- Starring: Bill Paxton; Julia Ormond
- Cinematography: Marc Felperlaan
- Edited by: Bert Rijkelijkhuizen
- Music by: Angelo Badalamenti
- Production company: First Floor Features
- Distributed by: A-Film Distribution (Netherlands)
- Release date: June 12, 2003
- Running time: 92 minutes
- Countries: Netherlands; United States
- Languages: English; French; German
- Budget: €16,000,000 (est.)

Resistance is a 2003 Dutch-American war film, directed by Todd Komarnicki and starring Bill Paxton, Julia Ormond, Philippe Volter, Sandrine Bonnaire, and Victor Reinier. It was written by Komarnicki and Anita Shreve, based on Shreve's 1995 novel of the same name. Resistance, with a 16 million euro budget, was the most expensive Dutch production ever at release. Its theatrical run only lasted for a few weeks.

== Plot ==
On 16 January 1944, a reconnaissance pilot survives a plane crash in Delahaut in German-occupied Belgium. The boy Jean Benoit finds the wounded pilot and takes him to the house of Claire and Henri Daussois who belong to the Belgian Resistance. As soon as Major Theodore 'Ted' Brice has recovered, he tells them that he needs to retrieve a book of codes, but the airplane is guarded by the Nazis. Meanwhile, Ted and Claire fall in love with each other. When three German guards that are protecting the debris of the airplane are executed, the Nazis select a group of villagers and hang them in a barn. When Henri finds that Ted and Claire are having a love affair, he betrays the pilot with tragic consequences.

== Cast ==
- Bill Paxton as Ted Brice
- Julia Ormond as Claire Daussois
- Philippe Volter as Henri Daussois
- Sandrine Bonnaire as Lucette Oomlop
- Jean-Michel Vovk as Anthoine
- Antoine Van Lierde as Jean Benoit
- Ariane Schluter as Beatrice Benoit
- Angelo Bison as Artaud Benoit
- Filip Peeters as Captain Haas
- Victor Reinier as The Interrogator
- Dennis Hayden as Eddie
