= The Indecent Woman =

1991 film

De onfatsoenlijke vrouw
- Directed by: Ben Verbong
- Written by: Marianne Dikker; Pea Fröhlich; Peter Märthesheimer; Jean van de Velde
- Cinematography: Lex Wertwijn
- Edited by: Ton de Graaff
- Music by: Nicola Piovani
- Distributed by: Meteor Film
- Release date: 26 April 1991
- Running time: 95 minutes
- Country: Netherlands
- Language: Dutch

The Indecent Woman or De onfatsoenlijke vrouw is a 1991 Dutch erotic thriller film directed by Ben Verbong.

== Cast ==
- José Way as Emilia
- Coen van Vrijberghe de Coningh as Charles
- Huub Stapel as Leon
- Lydia van Nergena as Anna
- Marieke van Leeuwen as Simone
- Theo de Groot as Marcel
- Peter Bolhuis as Brig. Vermeulen
- Niels Wolf as bewaker
- Peter Smits as verpleegkundige
- Aga de Wit as buurvrouw
- Regina General as tweelingzus
- Roos General as tweelingzus
- Aukje Jetten as Alice
- Earl van Es as antiliaan
- Jack Wouterse as getatoueerde man
