= Tatjana Šimić =

Croatian-Dutch model, actress and singer

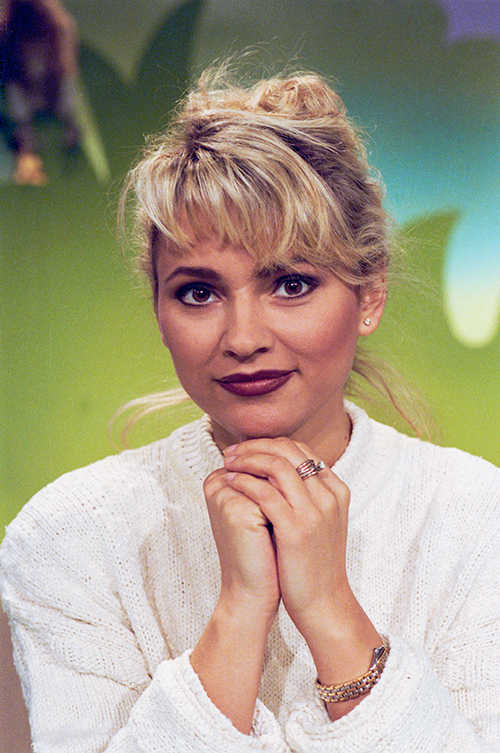
- Tatjana Šimić in 1992
- Born: Tatjana Šimić; 9 June 1963 (age 63); Zagreb, PR Croatia, Yugoslavia
- Occupations: Model, actress, singer
- Years active: 1986–present

Tatjana Šimić (born 9 June 1963), also known by the mononym Tatjana, is a Croatian-Dutch model, actress and singer.

== Biography ==
Šimić was born in Zagreb, PR Croatia, Yugoslavia on 9 June 1963, but moved with her mother and sister to Rotterdam in 1979 at the age of 16. In the 1980s, having won a national modeling contest, she commenced work as an actress and model. In the Netherlands, Belgium and Germany, she remains known for her portrayal of the character Kees Flodder, a daughter in the dysfunctional and anti-social Flodder family, which featured in several Dutch comedy films and a television series in the 1980s and 1990s. The original movie was popular in the Netherlands, reaching two and a half million viewers. Šimić, a sex symbol, has appeared on the cover of Playboy seventeen times between 1988 and 1996; thirteen times on the Dutch edition and four times on the German edition. In December 2012, she made her last appearance in the Dutch Playboy's Christmas special.

Šimić started a recording career in 1987 with her first single, "Baby Love". Her song "Chica Cubana" became a hit in Europe, followed a year later by "Awaka Boy" in 1989. In 1992, she recorded a version of "Can't Take My Eyes Off You" with Dutch singer Gerard Joling. Her first album was released in 1993 and included the hit "Feel Good" which reached #25 in the Netherlands Top 40. Her best known song "Santa Maria" was recorded and produced by Mike Stock and Matt Aitken of Stock Aitken Waterman becoming an international dance hit. It peaked at #40 in the UK Singles Chart in September 1996. A follow-up single "Calendar Girl" (1996) failed to attract the same success. A full album produced by Stock & Aitken's in-house producers Dave Ford, Julian Gingell and Peter Day called New Look was released in Japan (titled Santa Maria) and the Netherlands. It included the singles, "Santa Maria", "Calendar Girl" and new singles "First Time" and "Sweet Sweet Smile".

Since then she has released a number of dance singles, with "Baila Baila" reaching the Dutch Top 40 at #24 in 2001. In 2008, Tatjana made a comeback to the music scene with the Dutch language song Ik Laat Je Gaan, a cover of Croatian artist Tony Cetinski's Blago Onom Tko Te Ima, which left her signature disco sound behind for a more rock pop style. The track was Tatjana's biggest Dutch hit to date reaching #11 in the Dutch Singles Chart.

== Discography ==
=== Albums ===
- 1991: Tatjana
- 1993: Feel Good
- 1996: Santa Maria
- 1997: New Look NL #70

=== Singles ===
- 1987: "Baby Love"
- 1987: "Dance With Me"
- 1988: "Chica Cubana" NL #11
- 1988: "Awaka Boy" NL #40
- 1990: "A Letter To Your Heart"
- 1991: "You and Me" NL #81
- 1992: "Can't Take My Eyes Off You" NL #6
- 1992: "He's My Man"
- 1993: "Feel Good" NL #21
- 1993: "Never Never"
- 1994: "Don't You Want Me Baby"
- 1994: Na Na Na Na (Come On Let's Go Out)
- 1995: "Santa Maria" NL #37, AUS #50, UK #40
- 1996: "Calendar Girl" NL #73
- 1997: "The First Time" NL #41
- 1997: "O Baby I"
- 1997: "Boy I Know"
- 1997: "Your Love Is Magic"
- 1997: "Searching For You"
- 1999: "Crazy Way About You"
- 1999: "Be There In Time"
- 1999: "Wait And Wonder"
- 2000: "Be There In Time"
- 2000: "Baila Baila" NL #24
- 2001: "Caged"
- 2007: "Blago Onom Ko Te Oma"
- 2008: "Ik laat je gaan" NL #11
- 2010: "Ga Nu Maar" NL #93

== Filmography ==
=== Film ===
- Flodder (1986) - Kees Flodder
- Appointment with Yesterday (TV film, 1988)
- Starke Zeiten (1988)
- My Blue Heaven (1990) - Suzy
- Zlatne godine (1992) - TV Journalist
- Flodder in America (1992) - Kees Flodder
- Flodder 3 (1995) - Kees Flodder

=== Television ===
- Flodder (1993–1998) - Kees Flodder
- Kees Flodder (2026) - Kees Flodder
