= Killer Babes =

- Theatrical release poster
- Directed by: Dick Maas
- Written by: Dick Maas
- Produced by: Tom de Mol; Dick Maas
- Starring: Bracha van Doesburgh; Hadewych Minis; Sanne Wallis de Vries
- Cinematography: Guido van Gennep
- Edited by: Bert Rijkelijkhuizen
- Music by: Dick Maas
- Production companies: Tom de Mol Productions; Parachute Pictures; RTL Entertainment
- Distributed by: Independent Films
- Release date: 20 December 2007
- Running time: 100 minutes
- Country: Netherlands
- Language: Dutch
- Box office: $4.9 million

Killer Babes (Dutch: Moordwijven, slang for a "fantastic woman", more literally Murderbitches) is a 2007 Dutch black comedy about millionaire wives who get revenge on their cheating husbands by having them killed. The film is directed by Dick Maas. It was awarded a Golden Film, having sold more than 100'000 tickets in the first nine days of screening.

This film marks the first film in six years he has directed, and the first Dutch language film in twelve years, the previous being Flodder 3. It was first to be called 'De Botox Methode' (The Botox Method), but this title was dropped because Botox is a brand name.

== Plot ==
Three millionaire best friends, Kitty, Estelle and Nicolette, spend their days having botox injections, liposuction and other plastic surgery – all to keep up their looks for their husbands. After witnessing the murder of their favorite plastic surgeon by his wife, the three ponder the idea of similarly killing their husbands should they sleep with someone else. Of the three, Kitty is virtually certain that her husband is cheating on her, having seen him call 'Pamela' from his cell phone. To 'prove' her suspicions, her friend Estelle hands her a booklet, a "Top 50" checklist of strange behavior to see if he's indeed cheating on her.

After filling up nearly the whole list with suspicious behavior, the three drive to Amsterdam's Red Light District to find a serial killer to do the job. After a misunderstanding with a different man, Kitty comes into contact with a deformed man who isn't afraid to use a gun. Kitty asks that the murderer makes sure her husband's death looks like an accident. The man demands not only €10,000, but also a first edition press of the Cliff Richard song Summer Holiday – something Kitty's husband has in his possession. When Kitty goes to find the record, though, she finds out it's been given as a gift to a friend who is blind and in a wheelchair. Kitty sneaks in after a party thrown for guests and manages to get the record – though not before the blind man attempts to stab the 'intruder' with a sword, and accidentally electrocute himself on his jukebox.

With the record now given to the killer, Kitty goes back to have her eyelids done and advises her friends to have alibis in case of police questioning. Kitty, needing someone to pick her up, calls Nicolette's husband. However, he picks her up in Kitty's husband's Maybach – exactly the car the killer was going to run off the road to make an 'accident'. During a chase through the woods, Nicolette's husband admits to having an affair. The car is run off the road, and while Kitty survives, Nicolette's husband is critically injured. After a visit to the hospital, the affair is proven when the mistress shows up at his bedside. Nicolette and the mistress fight, which indirectly causes Nicolette's husband to die from his injuries.

After the funeral, Kitty's husband decides to use a plane to sprinkle the dead man's ashes over the 18th hole of their golf course. The killer, posing as a mechanic, rigs the plane to leak hydraulic oil during the flight. Estelle's husband, having met the mistress at the bedside of Nicolette's husband, is seen in his office with the mistress. The two, completely naked, wave at Kitty's husband as he flies by – but the plane actually slams into the building, killing them. Kitty's husband, meanwhile, managed to jump out of the plane at the last second, sustaining only a broken arm. Now depressed at not having been able to perform a 'simple' killing, the killer is ready to quit, but Kitty meets him and encourages him to continue.

A few days later, Kitty's husband is set to present an award at a Dutch Music awards show. Before the awards show, Kitty is introduced to 'Pamela' – the woman she suspected was sleeping with her husband, but who is actually a Belgian businesswoman he was doing business with. Kitty frantically tries to call off the planned killing – which will happen with a bomb planted in the appropriate awards envelope – not knowing that there actually IS a Pamela her husband has been sleeping with. The murderer, chased by security guards around the parking lot, steals a truck and tries to make his escape. Kitty runs on stage and throws the bomb away just in time. However, the killer winds up driving the truck through a back wall, running over not only Kitty's husband, but Pamela as well, who had run up to him just before. Now happy that her husband was killed for an actual adultery, she kisses the killer. A few seconds later, he vanishes before the police can apprehend him. One year later, the three widows are seen enjoying life on the boat of their late husbands – along with the killer, who has had plastic surgery done to make him look more handsome.

== Cast ==
- Bracha van Doesburgh as Kitty
- Hadewych Minis as Estelle
- Sanne Wallis de Vries as Nicolette
- Kees Boot as Hired Killer
- Hans Kesting as Evert-Jan Kroonenberg
- Bart Klever as Ivo
- Bart Oomen as Meindert

== Release ==
The film was released on DVD and Blu-ray by Warner Home Video on 28 May 2008.
