= De rode zwaan =

De Rode Zwaan
- Theatrical release poster
- Directed by: Martin Lagestee
- Written by: Sjoerd Kuyper
- Based on: De Rode Zwaan by Sjoerd Kuyper
- Produced by: Laurens Geels
- Starring: André van den Heuvel; Annet Nieuwenhuijzen; Rufus Heikens
- Cinematography: Lex Wertwijn
- Edited by: DKP/Amsterdam
- Music by: Paul M. van Brugge
- Production companies: First Floor Features; AVRO
- Distributed by: Buena Vista International
- Release date: 14 October 1999
- Running time: 100 minutes
- Country: Netherlands
- Language: Dutch

De Rode Zwaan is a 1999 Dutch fantasy film directed by Martin Lagestee and written by Sjoerd Kuyper, based on his 1996 book of the same name.

== Cast ==
- Rufus Heikens as Jacob
- Sanne Himmelreich as Neeltje
  - Annet Nieuwenhuijzen as Neeltje (70 years old)
- Liz Snoyink as Koningin Houtvolk
- Pierre Bokma as Generaal
- Frits Lambrechts
- Nick Majoor as Vezel
- Wolter Muller as Prins Houtvonk
- Thekla Reuten as Dochter van de generaal
- Ariane Schluter as Dokter
- André van den Heuvel as Opa
- Marloes van den Heuvel as Moeder van Jacob
- Mark van der Laan as Patrouille Commadant
- Joost van der Stel as Kwajongen

== Reception ==
De rode zwaan received mixed reviews from critics. Dick van den Heuvel of De Telegraaf gave the film a negative review and concluded that the film doesn’t even choose its audience. "For children under twelve, De rode zwaan is truly too gruesome. A baby is murdered in it, a completely unnecessary and disturbing scene, and for children over twelve, it’s all too fairy-tale-like. So who is supposed to watch it?

Bianca Stigter of NRC Handelsblad criticized the story and pacing, and wrote that "the flaws in direction and art direction prevent you from truly immersing yourself in this modern fairy tale."

Despite giving the film a negative review, Ab Zagt of Algemeen Dagblad praised the film's special effects. writing "in that respect, Lagestee’s film is a feast for the eyes".
