= Do Not Disturb (1999 film) =

- Theatrical release poster
- Directed by: Dick Maas
- Written by: Dick Maas
- Produced by: Laurens Geels; Dick Maas
- Starring: William Hurt; Jennifer Tilly; Denis Leary; Michael Chiklis; Francesca Brown; Corey Johnson
- Cinematography: Marc Felperlaan
- Edited by: Bert Rijkelijkhuizen
- Music by: Dick Maas
- Production companies: First Floor Features; CTL-UFA International
- Distributed by: Buena Vista International (Netherlands); Advanced Film-Verleih (Germany)
- Release dates: 4 November 1999 (Netherlands); 1 June 2000 (Germany)
- Running time: 94 minutes
- Countries: Netherlands; Germany
- Language: English
- Budget: $6 million
- Box office: ƒ12 million

Do Not Disturb, also known as Silent Witness, is a 1999 English-language Dutch-German mystery film directed, written, produced and composed by Dick Maas. Maas produced it with Laurens Geels. The English-language film stars William Hurt, Jennifer Tilly and Denis Leary.

== Plot ==
American pharmaceutical executive Walter Richmond takes a business trip to Amsterdam, accompanied by his wife Cathryn and their 10-year-old daughter Melissa, who has been mute ever since an accident years before. To communicate, Melissa wears a small magic marker board around her neck.

Melissa makes a trip to the ladies' room at the hotel De L'Europe and gets separated from her parents. She wanders out of the hotel and onto the street, where Melissa witnesses the execution of Simon Van der Molen, the attorney representing Walter's Dutch client.

Melissa is spotted by the killers — hit man Bruno Decker and his employer, Rudolph Hartman, who turns out to be Walter's client.

Hartman had Van Der Molen killed to prevent Van Der Molen from revealing the side effects of Hartman's new medication, which he's marketing to Walter's firm. If Van Der Molen would have told Walter about the side effects, Walter would have declined the medication, and Hartman would have been out of a chance to make a lot of money.

Melissa finds temporary refuge with a homeless man named Simon, then eludes Hartman by stealing a police car, which she promptly smashes into a bistro because she doesn't know how to drive.

Melissa is reunited with her parents at the hotel, but Walter innocently reveals to Hartman his daughter's recent adventures and whereabouts. Hartman tells Decker where Melissa is, and Decker pursues her from her room, down an elevator shaft, and into the suite of rock star Billy Boy Manson, an obvious parody of Marilyn Manson, who tries to sexually assault Melissa. But before Manson can do anything to Melissa, Decker arrives and kills Manson for getting in his way.

Having escaped Billy Boy's clutches, Melissa eludes Decker by climbing out onto a ledge and plunging into the canal below. But Melissa isn't even safe in an ambulance: after Decker is killed, Hartman carjacks the ambulance and drives off. Melissa is rescued, and Hartman is killed when the ambulance crashes.

== Cast ==
- William Hurt as Walter Richmond
- Jennifer Tilly as Cathryn Richmond
- Denis Leary as Simon
- Francesca Brown as Melissa Richmond
- Michael Chiklis as Rudolph Hartman
- Corey Johnson as Bruno Decker
- Jason Merrells as Chris Mulder
- Michael A. Goorjian as Billy Boy Manson
- David Gwillim as Simon Van der Molen

== Reception ==
Hans Beerekamp of NRC Handelsblad gave the film a positive review and writes that the film is "superbly written, impeccably acted, black comedy juggling prejudice, which for a Dutch audience also contains a number of double-bottoms".
