= Flodders in America =

1992 film by Dick Maas

- Theatrical release poster
- Directed by: Dick Maas
- Written by: Dick Maas
- Produced by: Laurens Geels; Dick Maas
- Starring: Huub Stapel; Nelly Frijda; Rene van 't Hof; Tatjana Simic; Jon Polito; Lou Landré; Lonny Price; Mandy Negerman; Melle de Boer; Dan Frazer; Amanda Redington; Colin Stinton; Deirdre Harrison
- Cinematography: Marc Felperlaan
- Edited by: Hans van Dongen
- Music by: Dick Maas
- Production company: First Floor Features
- Distributed by: United International Pictures
- Release date: 3 July 1992
- Running time: 95 minutes
- Country: Netherlands
- Languages: Dutch; English
- Budget: 11,6 million guilders
- Box office: $15 million (Netherlands)

Flodders in America (Dutch: Flodder in Amerika!), released in Quebec as Les Lavigueur Redéménagent, is a 1992 Dutch comedy film directed by Dick Maas. The film is the sequel of the successful film Flodder from 1986. It was filmed on location in New York and stars Dutch actors Huub Stapel, Nelly Frijda, Tatjana Simic, Rene van 't Hof, Lou Landré, Gerard Joling, Dick Rienstra, and American actor Jon Polito as nightclub owner Larry Rosenbaum.

== Plot ==
The city council comes into contact with a cultural exchange project in the United States, which proposes to have an average family of either country live for a year in the other one. The sneaky councilman proposes the Flodders, who have been causing many problems over the last year, for the exchange, in the hope of getting rid of them for good. Sjakie van Kooten, the social worker who is guiding the Flodders' social integration, is sent with them.

After a flight in which the family causes many problems, Sjakie and the Flodders land in New York. When Sjakie is renting a car, the Flodders are mistaken for a Russian delegation of scientists and taken to the Plaza Hotel. Sjakie loses the family and has his car towed away, forcing him to take a taxi to the office of his American colleagues, only to get stuck in the New York traffic and thereby arriving to late at the office and at the hotel he booked. The Flodders meanwhile go sightseeing in Manhattan and are invited to the reception of the Roosevelt Foundation which was meant for the Russian doctors. At the reception, a young man named Geoffrey sees daughter Kees and immediately tries to hook up with her, claiming he instantly fell in love. When the family gets back at the Plaza Hotel, the staff has found out about the mix-up and the Flodders are thrown out, forcing them to spend the night in Central Park. The next day, they get food by stealing a hot dog car and later by roasting some birds.

When searching through Sjakie's suitcase, the Flodders find the phone number of the exchange project and ring the office, where Sjakie has just arrived. When trying to get a taxi, Sjakie gets pushed aside and his glasses fall through a grid, which results in him getting stuck while trying to retrieve them. Hours go by, with Sjakie even getting robbed by two hoodlums and being urinated on by a dog, until a demented homeless person helps him out and takes him to a shelter to get some food. However, a fight breaks out in the shelter, after which the police arrive and throw Sjakie and the homeless person in jail for a few days. The Flodders meanwhile rescue a man who is attacked by a group of muggers, after which the grateful man introduces himself as Larry Rosenbaum and takes them to the shady night club he owns. Soon he proposes they come work for him.

A few days later the Flodders and the Rosenbaum couple have redecorated the night club, while at the same time Sjakie and his homeless friend are released from jail. When spotting the Flodder sons across the road, Sjakie tries to get to them, but gets hit by a car and ends up in hospital with a concussion. That same night, the night club opens again with a more Dutch-oriented theme: bitterballen are served as snacks and daughter Kees does a striptease in a Frau Antje costume. Son Kees secretly steals gasoline from the guests' car, having discovered that gasoline in the United States is far cheaper than in the Netherlands, and stores the stolen fuel in an empty water tank on the roof to make a huge profit back in the Netherlands (while not realising that there is no way he can get the tank to the Netherlands). Meanwhile, Sjakie gets mixed up with another patient at hospital, only to wake up in the morning to discover he has had a transgender operation.

After some days, Johnny, daughter Kees and son Kees meet the muggers from Central Park again and get chased by them through the streets of Manhattan, resulting in the muggers crashing into the New York Stock Exchange, after which the Flodder siblings are arrested. However, when finding the business card of Geoffrey, the police immediately release them, after which the Flodders are met by Geoffrey who asks whether he can take daughter Kees out for the night, which Johnny only allows when Geoffrey pays him $5000. Although daughter Kees is not enthusiastic about Geoffrey, one of his advisers fears the worst and does research on the Flodder family. Soon it becomes clear to the viewer that Geoffrey's father is in fact the president of the United States. Not wanting his son to be involved with a white trash girl, the president decides to go the nightclub incognito, to talk daughter Kees out of the affair.

Just as the president arrives and tries to talk to daughter Kees in her dressing room, the situation escalates because Rosenbaum catches his wife and Johnny having sex in the stockroom, after which Rosenbaum gets infuriated and tries to attack Johnny with a shotgun. By the time the police arrive, Ma Flodder has already stopped Rosenbaum by putting his head underwater. However, when Ma spits out her cigar it accidentally flies into the frying pan, creating a fire which lights the gasoline in the water tank. The water tank is launched into the air and flies over Manhattan (spotted by characters like the homeless person and the muggers) after which it hits the head of the Statue of Liberty. The head promptly explodes.

When rushing into daughter Kees's dressing room, two police officers recognise the president, who had tried to get away and thereby fell over the topless girl. In order to prevent a scandal, the American government makes an agreement with the Dutch embassy and has the Flodders released from jail, on the condition that they leave the country. Johnny manages to get a first class flight for the family as well as much expensive clothing, as a compensation for not telling anybody about the scandal. When on the plane back to Europe, he teasingly asks Sjakie whether he is reading Playgirl.

== Comic book adaptation ==
Simultaneously with the film release the movie was also adapted into a comic book written by Dick Maas and Wijo Koek and drawn by Marcel Bosma.

== Reception ==
The film had the biggest opening in Dutch history, grossing $1,302,819 (2,175,708 guilders) in four days from 93 screens. It went on to gross $15 million in the Netherlands from 1.5 million admissions, making it the 11th-most-popular Dutch film at the time.

It then opened on 44 screens in Belgium, taking it to 137 screens in total, a Benelux record.
