= Friends of Clean Accounts =

European political group

Logo of the group

Friends of Clean Accounts is a group of European politicians advocating and working towards "clean accounts" of the EU. By this they mean ordinary (i.e., proper) accounting and controlling, leading to efficient use of funds throughout the EU. An important part of this endeavor is transparent information and free access to it.

== Overview ==
This group has been initiated by people of the EU-critical SOS Democracy, but comprises all those interested in its purpose – including proponents of the EU. Gabriele Stauner , member of the EU Parliament's Budget Control Committee, presides most of the group's meetings, organized by the group's speaker Jens-Peter Bonde and Chris Heaton-Harris.

The Friends of Clean Accounts also supports so called "whistle-blowers" in their fight against corruption within the EU institutions and EU projects. So they warred off the dismissal of Paul van Buitenen. Or invited the suspended Chief Auditor Marta Andreasen to the EU Parliament to present her analyses of the grave faults of EU accounts and ways to improvement. Or supported Hans-Martin Tillack – editor of Stern, who also revealed the Eurostat scandal and with Andreas Oldag is a co-author of a book on the EU Spaceship Brussels (Raumschiff Brüssel) – in his rights as he was arrested by Belgian police at the request of the EU anti-fraud office OLAF.

They also made pressure on the Santer Commission to withdraw on March 19, 1999, collected signatures for the Motion of Censure against the Commission during spring of 2004 on the grounds of the Eurostat scandal.

== See also ==
- Accountability in the European Union
- Marta Andreasen
- Paul Van Buitenen
- Whistleblowers
