= Tillack =

Tillack is a surname. Notable people with the surname include:

- Hans-Martin Tillack (born 1961), German journalist
- Mark Steven Tillack, American engineer
