= Kidnapping of Freddy Heineken =

1983 kidnapping of Heineken CEO

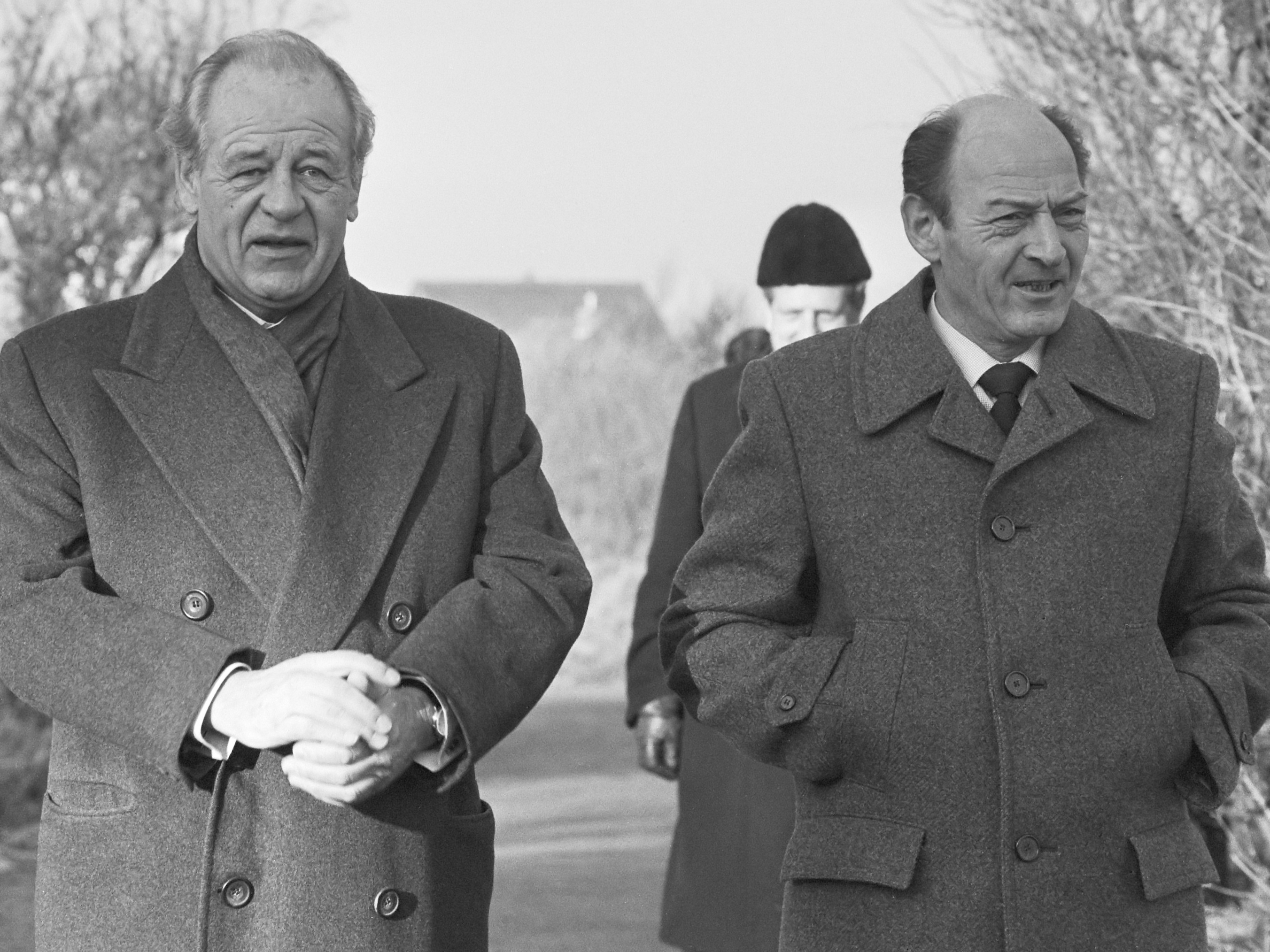
Heineken (left) and Doderer (2 December 1983)

Freddy Heineken, chairman of the board of directors and CEO of Heineken International (a brewing company) and one of the richest people in the Netherlands, and his driver Ab Doderer, were kidnapped on 9 November 1983 in Amsterdam. They were released when Heineken's family paid, against police advice, a ransom of 35 million Dutch guilders (~US$18 million) on 30 November of that year. The kidnappers—Cor van Hout, Willem Holleeder, Jan Boellaard, Frans Meijer, and Martin Erkamps—were all eventually caught, and served prison terms.

Before being extradited, Van Hout and Holleeder stayed for more than three years in France, first on the run, then in prison, and then, awaiting a change of the extradition treaty, under house arrest, and finally in prison again. Meijer escaped and lived in Paraguay for years, until he was discovered by Peter R. de Vries and imprisoned there.

In 2003, Meijer stopped resisting his extradition to the Netherlands, and was transferred to a Dutch prison to serve the last part of his term. The kidnapping and subsequent trials and extraditions drew national attention and received broad media coverage. Several books were published on the kidnapping and two movies were made. Several of the kidnappers later became well-known figures in Dutch organized crime.

Shortly after his release, Van Hout was jailed once again, this time for four years, for his role in a drug smuggling ring. After two earlier failed attempts, Van Hout was assassinated on 24 January 2003 in Amstelveen, a year after being freed a second time, and had a "mafia-style" funeral, with a white hearse pulled by eight Friesian horses leading a procession of 15 white limousines.

== Kidnapping ==
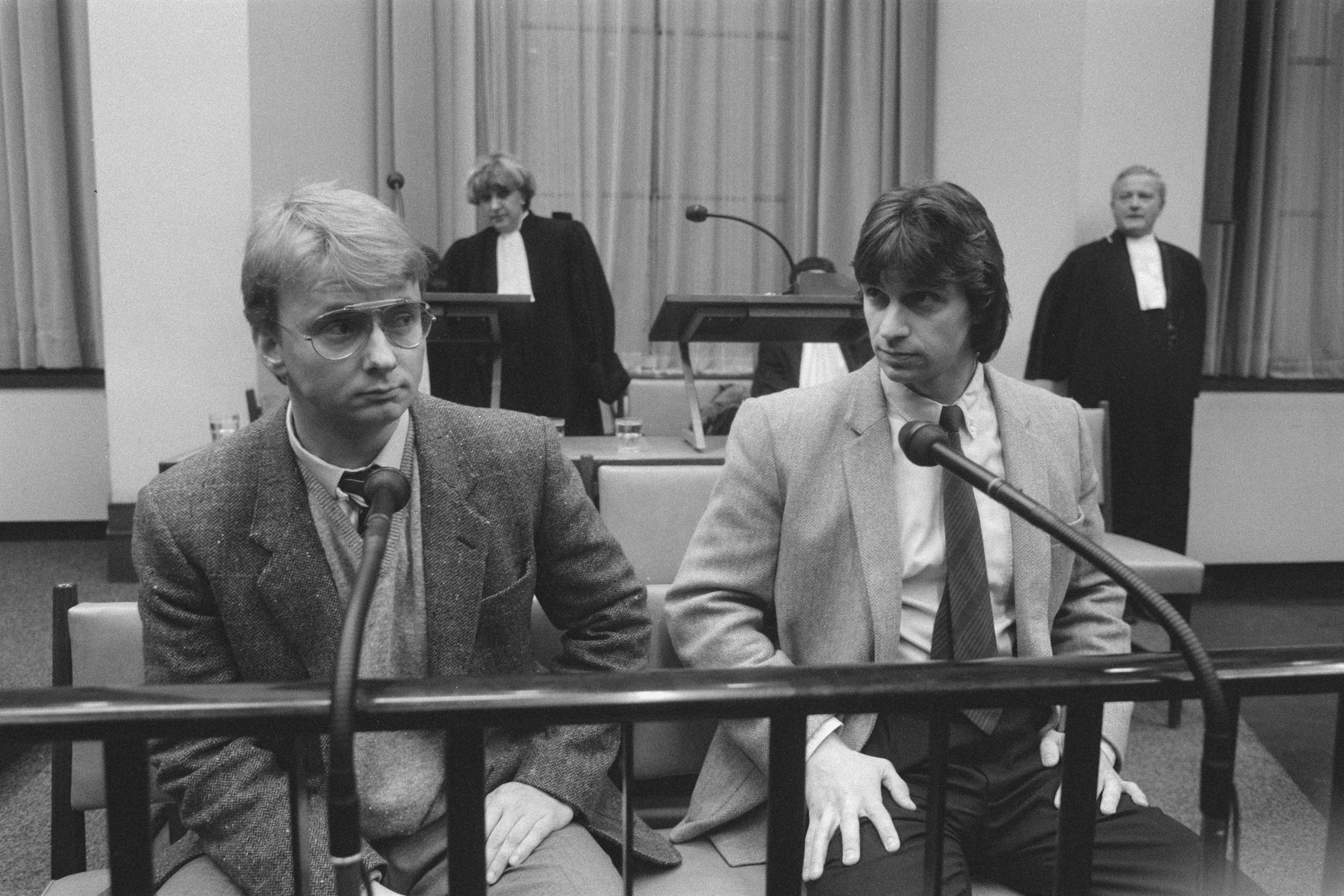
Cor van Hout and Willem Holleeder in 1987

Cor van Hout, Willem Holleeder, Frans Meijer, and Jan Boellaard had been preparing the kidnapping for two years. Martin Erkamps was later involved. Several attempts to kidnap Freddy Heineken and his driver Ab Doderer at Heineken's home in Noordwijk failed when Heineken and Doderer did not show up. Subsequently, they were kidnapped on 9 November 1983 at 18:56 in front of Heineken's office at the Weteringplantsoen in Amsterdam. They were detained for three weeks in a Quonset hut, belonging to Boellaard's wood manufacturing company, at business park De Heining in Westpoort, in the western part of the Amsterdam harbour area. The hut was prepared in advance by the creation of a double wall on one end, with two soundproof cells with a hidden door. This made the 42-meter long hut shorter on the inside by 4 meters, which went unnoticed. Outside working hours, the kidnappers provided for their prisoners, who were tethered to the wall with chains. The payment of the ransom was the highest ever paid for a kidnap victim at the time: 11 million dollars. The kidnappers fled before releasing the hostages; after a "lucky lead", the police discovered the hostages alive.

After the release of the hostages on 30 November, Van Hout and Holleeder managed to escape. They both fled to Paris. However, the two men were arrested by the French police on 29 February 1984. They resisted extradition to the Netherlands and were at first placed under house arrest in a hotel on 6 December 1985, before being transferred on 13 February 1986 first to Guadeloupe, then to Saint Barthélemy, then to the French part of Saint Martin, then to Île Tintamarre, then again to Guadeloupe. Finally, they were taken back to Europe, where they were at first held in a hotel in Évry before being brought to a French prison. They were finally extradited to the Netherlands on 31 October 1986.

== In popular culture ==
=== Books ===
Peter R. de Vries wrote De ontvoering van Alfred Heineken (1987) from the point of view of Cor van Hout, based on interviews with Van Hout and Holleeder in 1986, during their hotel arrest in France. Van Hout and Holleeder asked that the book not be published until after their trial. In following issues, De Vries added several extra chapters about later events. During the kidnapping and the aftermath, the Dutch magazine Panorama followed the events with several reports and pictures. In 2010, these reports were bundled and published in the book De Heineken Ontvoering, by journalist Nick Kivits and kidnapping expert Sjerp Jaarsma.

=== Movies ===
On 27 October 2011, the film De Heineken Ontvoering by Maarten Treurniet had its premiere. It was written by Maarten Treurniet and Kees van Beijnum. It stars Rutger Hauer as Freddy Heineken, Reinout Scholten van Aschat as Rem Hubrechts, Gijs Naber as Cor van Hout, Teun Kuilboer as Frans Meijer, and Korneel Evers as Jan Boellaard. Kidnapper Willem Holleeder filed a preliminary injunction requesting that the film be forbidden. Jan Boellaard, Frans Meijer and Martin Erkamps also demanded that IDTV should not show the film, as it would not be accurate enough. The injunction and requests were unsuccessful.

The film Kidnapping Freddy Heineken (U.S. title Kidnapping Mr. Heineken) by Daniel Alfredson premiered in the Netherlands on 8 January 2015. It is written by William Brookfield, based on the 1987 book by de Vries. It stars Anthony Hopkins as Freddy Heineken, Sam Worthington as Willem Holleeder, Jim Sturgess as Cor van Hout, Ryan Kwanten as Jan Boellaard, and Mark van Eeuwen as Frans Meijer. A 31-minute video about the event, The Most Genius Kidnapping in History, was posted on YouTube in November 2024.

== See also ==
- List of kidnappings
- List of solved missing person cases
