= Budget accountability in the European Union =

Public accountability measures of the European Union

The European Union employs a variety of public accountability measures to review and reform budgets across government. As the EU's budget is at risk of maladministration, the Court of Auditors reports annually on the management of the budget. European Union auditors have stated that as they implement more transparency and double-entry bookkeeping systems, it is likely to improve budget management.

In order to strengthen the means of fraud prevention, the commission established the European Anti-Fraud Office (OLAF) on 28 April 1999, under the European Commission Decision 1999/352. The Office was given responsibility for conducting administrative anti-fraud investigations by having conferred on it a special independent status.

== Auditing ==
The Court of Auditors checks that all the Union's revenue has been received and all its expenditure incurred lawfully and regularly, and that the EU budget has been managed soundly. It was established on 22 July 1975 by the Budgetary Treaty of 1975 and began operating as an external Community audit body in October 1977.

== Transparency ==
The meetings of the Council of Ministers (the relevant Minister from each member state) are mostly public. A webcast on the sessions can also be seen on the website of the council.

Also, the standard of plenary sittings of the European Parliament is to stream the debates over the Internet. In addition, the public can observe sittings directly from a separate gallery. Also, nearly all sittings of Parliamentary Committees are observable by the public, except for certain matters such as requests for removal of the parliamentary immunity of a Member of the European Parliament.

In addition, the activities of the European Commission are subject to transparency. The monitoring of the commission has to be performed by a body that is independent of the commission, such as the "European Anti-Fraud Office" (OLAF) which reports to the European Parliament.

European Parliament adopted binding rules on lobby transparency in 2019, where MEPs involved in drafting and negotiating legislation must publish their meetings with lobbyists. The amendment says that "rapporteurs, shadow rapporteurs or committee chairs shall, for each report, publish online all scheduled meetings with interest representatives falling under the scope of the Transparency Register"- the database of the EU.

== Corruption and money laundering ==
European Parliament officials have been accused of corruption and money laundering due to inference by the governments of Qatar, Morocco, Mauritania, and Russia, also called Qatargate and Russiagate.

Parliamentary Assembly of the Council of Europe adopted a motion that states that "it regrets the fact that Members of the European Parliament have accepted and failed to declare trips to Azerbaijan, visits to the Nagorno-Karabakh region and luxury hotel stays that were organised and paid for by Azerbaijani officials."

The current general manager of public Czech Television Jan Souček is blacking out financial documents to hide them from the public.

== See also ==
- Resignation of the Santer Commission
- Marta Andreasen – former Chief Accountant of the European Union. She criticises the European Union accounting system for being open to fraud.
- Paul van Buitenen – former auditor in the European Union who denounced fraud and mismanagement within the commission and the abuse of the EU expenses and staff allowance system.
- List of books on the European Union

== Books on the subject ==
- Andreas Oldag, Hans-Martin Tillack: Raumschiff Brüssel – Wie die Demokratie in Europa scheitert (in German, Spaceship Brussels – How Democracy in Europe fails), Argon Verlag, 2003 (1st ed., hardcover), ISBN 3-87024-578-6, ISBN 978-3-87024-578-8 / Fischer, Frankfurt 2004 (2nd ed.) ISBN 3-596-15746-3, ISBN 978-3-596-15746-4
- Paul van Buitenen: Blowing the Whistle: Fraud in the European Commission, Politicos Pub, 2000, ISBN 1-902301-46-3, ISBN 978-1-902301-46-4
