= Stromboli (2022 film) =

- Directed by: Michiel van Erp
- Written by: Roos Ouwehand; Paula van der Oest
- Based on: Stromboli by Saskia Noort
- Produced by: Paula van der Oest; Mark van Eeuwen; Alain de Levita
- Starring: Elise Schaap; Tim McInnerny; Anna Chancellor; Pieter Embrechts; Marisa van Eyle; Mark van Eeuwen; Taz Munyaneza
- Cinematography: Coen Stroeve
- Edited by: Madelief Blanken; Axel Skovdal Roelofs
- Music by: Rutger Reinders
- Distributed by: Netflix
- Release date: 3 November 2022 (Netherlands)
- Running time: 86 min.
- Country: Netherlands
- Languages: English & Dutch

Stromboli is a 2022 Dutch drama film released by Netflix, starring Elise Schaap as the main lead. It is based on an eponymous 2018 novel by Saskia Noort.

The film focuses on Sara, who confronts her painful past by going on a retreat on the Sicilian volcanic island of Stromboli.
