= Van Buitenen =

Van Buitenen is a surname. Notable people with the surname include:

- J. A. B. van Buitenen (1928–1979), Dutch Indologist
- Paul van Buitenen (born 1957), Dutch politician and civil servant
