= Frans Meijer =

Frans Meijer may refer to:

- Frank Nicholas Meyer (1875–1918), born Frans Nicholaas Meijer in the Netherlands, American explorer and collector of plants
- Frans Meijer, one of five Dutch men who were caught and imprisoned for the 1983 Kidnapping of Freddy Heineken
