= List of books on the European Union =

List of books on the European Union:

- Brussels Laid Bare by Marta Andreasen (2009) St Edwards Press, ISBN 978-0-9554188-1-5
- Blowing the Whistle: Fraud in the European Commission by Paul van Buitenen (2000) Politicos Publishing, ISBN 978-1-902301-46-4
- The European Dream by Jeremy Rifkin (2009) ISBN 978-1-58542-345-3
- In de loopgraven van Brussel: de slag om een transparant Europa by Paul van Buitenen (2004) Ten Have, ISBN 978-90-259-5422-2
- The Imminent Crisis: Greek Debt and the Collapse of the European Monetary Union by Grant Wonders (2010) Cambridge: GW Publishing; CreateSpace. ISBN 978-1-4528-6633-8.
- Raumschiff Brüssel. Wie die Demokratie in Europa scheitert (Spaceship Brussels. How democracy in Europe fails) by Andreas Oldag and Hans-Martin Tillack (German, 2003) S. Fischer Verlag, ISBN 978-3-87024-578-8
- The United States of Europe, A Eurotopia? by Freddy Heineken (1992) Amsterdam, De Amsterdamse Stichting voor de Historische Wetenschap, ISBN 978-90-90-05272-4
