= The Dinner Club =

2010 Dutch drama film

- Theatrical release poster
- Directed by: Robert Jan Westdijk
- Screenplay by: Robert Jan Westdijk; Marjan Lammers
- Based on: The Dinner Club by Saskia Noort
- Produced by: Edwin van Meurs
- Starring: Bracha van Doesburgh; Thom Hoffman; Angela Schijf; Mark van Eeuwen; Halina Reijn; Peter Paul Muller; Birgit Schuurman
- Cinematography: Lex Brand
- Edited by: Menno Boerema
- Music by: Steve Willaert
- Production companies: Infinity Film & TV Productions
- Distributed by: Benelux Film Distributors
- Release date: 25 November 2010 (Netherlands)
- Running time: 90 minutes
- Country: Netherlands
- Languages: Dutch; English
- Box office: $1.9 million

The Dinner Club (Dutch: De eetclub) is a 2010 Dutch thriller film directed by Robert Jan Westdijk from a script he co-wrote with Marjan Lammers based on the novel of the same name by Saskia Noort. The film stars were Bracha van Doesburgh, Thom Hoffman, Angela Schijf, Mark van Eeuwen, Halina Reijn, Peter Paul Muller, and Birgit Schuurman. It follows a woman who moved with her family to an affluent neighborhood, where she is invited to join a dining club.

Following the success of The Dark House, several other Noort novels were optioned for adaptations which included the Dinner Club. The filming took place in 2010 around Aerdenhout and Renkum.

The film was released in Dutch theaters on 25 November 2010. It received generally negative reviews from critics, but received a Golden Film for having at least 100,000 visitors at the box office.

== Plot ==
Karen, a freelance translator, and Michel, an IT professional, are moving with their daughter Sophie to an affluent residential neighbourhood. While doing some shopping, Karen encounters Simon. Later, she picks up her child from school, where she then meets and becomes friends with her neighbour, Hanneke. Hanneke invites her to the dinner club she is a part of. Karen meets the rest of the club, which includes Babette, Angela, and Patricia. The next morning, Hanneke shows off the interior designs she has made for Angela and Kees, which she has stored on her whale-shaped USB-stick. In the night, Karen and Michel go to Patricia's and Simon's party, where Simon comes on to Karen.

After bringing their kids to school, Karen and Hanneke visit Evert, who is staying at a mental institution. Subsequently, Hanneke complains about her friends avoiding Evert and then gives Karen her very own USB-stick in the style of her own as a present. Afterwards, Evert is brought home by Simon and is given a welcome home party. Karen is hired by Kees to translate a brochure. At one of their dinner meetings, the women are intruded on by their husbands, who are dressed up in stereotypical female clothing, only for it to get out of hand between Simon and Evert, who end up injured.

In the middle of the night, the home of Evert and Babette is burned down. Consequently, Evert is killed by apparent suicide. In the aftermath, Hanneke is inconsolable over his death and doesn't buy the suicide part.

Babette and her kids move in with Karen and Michel. Michel goes onto a business trip to Italy for an undetermined length of time. Karen receives a text from Hanneke to meet up the next day, but Hanneke never shows up. Instead, she encounters Simon again and they have sex for the first time.

Karen receives a text message stating that Hanneke was found. At the hospital, she was told that Hanneke had dropped from a hotel balcony and is now in a coma. Karen is then questioned about it by the police. Afterwards, Patricia and Angela tell the rest of the club that they visited Hanneke, and their conversation went poorly after they dismissed accusations made by Hanneke revolving around money. They also tell Karen that Hanneke and Evert had an affair despite their partners knowing. Karen visits the hotel room where Hanneke stayed and is found by Detective Dorien, who gives her a contact card.

Karen and Simon continue their relationship at a secret cottage. Later, she visits Hanneke who remains in a coma and argues with Ivo, who later accuses Karen of tampering with medical equipment after Hanneke had a heart attack. The detective thanks Karen for cooperating even though she didn't, causing distrust among her friends. Michel returns from his business trip; he has made a deal with Simon about investing in his business, with Simon claiming that he agreed to remain close to Karen.

In Simon's car, Karen finds Hanneke's USB stick and replaces it with her own. On it, she finds information that Hanneke knew that Evert didn't commit suicide and wanted to divorce Babette and marry Hanneke instead, and that Evert figured out that Simon laundered money with a building project in Portugal. Michel doesn't believe her and tells her Hanneke died, and the police detective finds the evidence insufficient.

Karen divulges all the information she knows to Babette. During Hanneke's funeral, Karen tries to find information at Hanneke's house but is caught by a maid. Out of guilt, Karen reveals she cheated, but Michel already knew. While biking home, Karen is driven into a creek by Ivo by accident. Karen is told that Babette visited Hanneke alongside Patricia and Angela; in fact, it was her idea. As a result, Karen investigates Babette's room and finds incriminating evidence and medicine in the urn.

She confronts Angela about the evidence and wants to give it to the police, but Karen is seized by Simon and taken to a construction site. She manages to escape him, but not before Babette, who came with her and Simon's baby, incapacitates her and demands that Simon throw her off the building as proof of his devotion; he refuses. In the confrontation, Babette falls off the building and Karen saves the baby. In the end, Karen and her family return to the city.

== Cast ==
- Bracha van Doesburgh as Karen van der Made
- Thom Hoffman as Simon Vogel
- Angela Schijf as Babette Struyk
- Mark van Eeuwen as Michel Brouwers
- Halina Reijn as Hanneke Lemstra
- Peter Paul Muller as Ivo Smit
- Birgit Schuurman as Angela Bijlsma
- Bas Keijzer as Evert
- Irma Hartog as Patricia Vogel
- Mattijn Hartemink as Kees Bijlsma
- Romana Vrede as Dorien
- Magali Bruins as Sophie
- Mees Harteveld as Mees
- Joep Litjens as Beau
- Gijs Reimert as Baby Luuk
- Guusje Zautsen as Lotte
- Peter Blankenstein as doctor
- Julia van de Graaff as cleaner
- Sita Manichand as school teacher

== Production ==
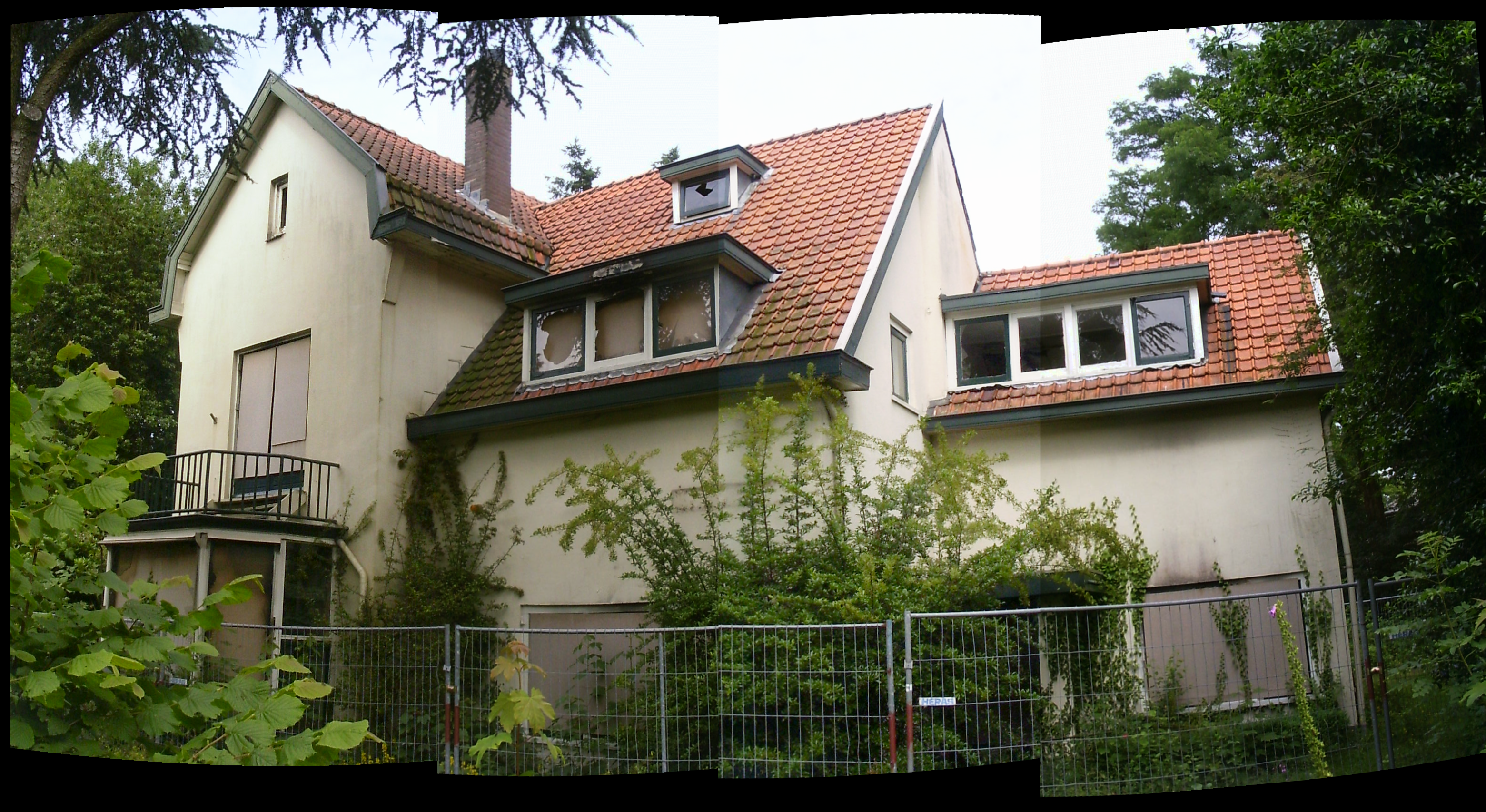
Villa in Renkum used for the fire.

Following the success of The Dark House, Saskia Noort other novels were being optioned for film adaptation including The Dinner Club. The cast was announced in March 2010 by Benelux Film based on the bestselling book that came out in 2004. Bracha van Doesburgh and Mark van Eeuwen were cast as the main couple, with Halina Reijn, Peter Paul Muller, Angela Schijf and Thom Hoffman filling out the main cast. Filming took place in Aerdenhout and Renkum, at the latter an abandoned villa was set on to fire for a scene.

== Release ==
The film was released in Dutch theaters on November 25, 2010. The film was supposed to be shown at a European film festival in Uganda, but was banned by the Uganda censorship board. The embassy of the Netherlands withdrew from appearing at the festival.

=== Home media ===
On April 22, 2011, The film was released on DVD and Blu-ray by Dutch FilmWorks.

== Reception ==
The film received generally negative reviews from critics, After the premiere, Saskia Noort heavily criticized the film during RTL Boulevard for changing the ending and considered it inferior to the novel.

The film received a Golden Film for 100.000 visitors.
