= The Heineken Kidnapping =

2011 Dutch film

- Theatrical release poster
- Directed by: Maarten Treurniet
- Produced by: Frans van Gestel; Arnold Heslenfeld; Richard Claus
- Starring: Rutger Hauer; Reinout Scholten van Aschat; Gijs Naber; Teun Kuilboer; Korneel Evers
- Cinematography: Giulio Biccari
- Edited by: J.P. Luijsterburg
- Music by: Junkie XL
- Production companies: IDTV Film; VARA
- Distributed by: A-Film Distribution
- Release date: 26 October 2011
- Running time: 127 minutes
- Country: Netherlands
- Language: Dutch
- Box office: $3,487,309

The Heineken Kidnapping (Dutch: De Heineken Ontvoering) is a 2011 Dutch crime film directed by Maarten Treurniet, and based on the 1983 kidnapping of Freddy Heineken in the Netherlands.

== Premise ==
A bold and amateur kidnapping goes wildly awry in this fictionalized account of beer magnate Alfred Heineken's 1983 abduction, which would go on to become one of the most infamous crimes conducted in the Netherlands.

== Cast ==
- Rutger Hauer as Alfred Heineken
- Reinout Scholten van Aschat as Rem
- Gijs Naber as Cor
- Teun Kuilboer as Frans
- Korneel Evers as Jan
- Truus te Selle as Mrs. Heineken
- Marjolein Keuning as Els
- Sallie Harmsen as Lisa
- Menno Van Beekum as Ab Doderer
- Ton Kas as Meneer Humbrechts
- Beppie Melissen as Mevrouw Humbrechts
- Laurie Reijs as Sonja
- Marcel Hensema as Kees Sietsma
- Genio de Groot as Korthals Altes

== See also ==
- Kidnapping Freddy Heineken - 2015 film based on the same events
