= Het Zakmes =

1981 Dutch children's novel by Sjoerd Kuyper

Het Zakmes is a children's novel by Dutch writer Sjoerd Kuyper. It was first published in 1981. The novel is about a young boy called Mees who has difficulty returning a penknife to his friend in another town.

The 1992 film based on the novel, The Pocket-knife, won several awards including the Golden Calf. A television series based on the book won an International Emmy Award for children's programming in 1993.
