= Marta Andreasen =

Argentine-born Spanish accountant (born 1954)

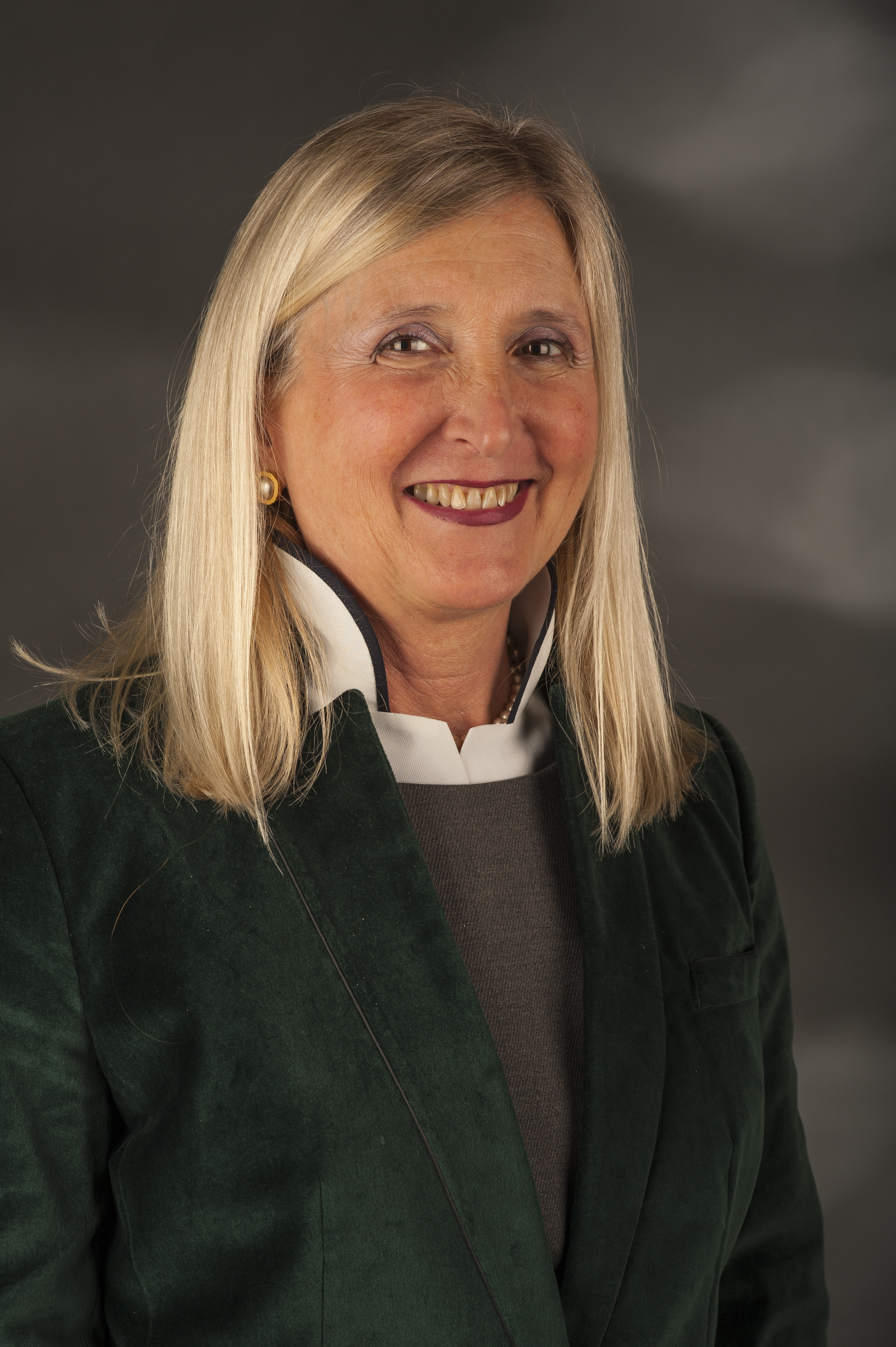

Member of the European Parliament for South East England
- In office 14 July 2009 – 2 July 2014
- Preceded by: Ashley Mote
- Succeeded by: Janice Atkinson

Personal details
- Born: Buenos Aires, Argentina
- Party: Conservative
- Other political affiliations: UK Independence Party (until 2013)
- Profession: Accountant

Marta Andreasen is an Argentine-born Spanish accountant. She was employed in January 2002 by the European Commission as Chief Accountant, and raised concerns about flaws in the commission's accounting system which she felt left it vulnerable to potential fraud. Elected as a Member of the European Parliament for the UK Independence Party (UKIP) in the 2009 election, she defected to the Conservative Party in February 2013. She lost her seat in the 2014 European Parliamentary election.

== Professional career ==
Andreasen qualified in 1977 as a certified public accountant in Buenos Aires, then worked for five years as an auditor at PricewaterhouseCoopers.

=== OECD ===
She joined the Organisation for Economic Co-operation and Development (OECD) in 1998, where she reported serious problems with its accounting system, raised her concerns with the management and suggested reforms. After initial resistance, Arthur Andersen was assigned for an outside analysis. In August 2000, their report described the OECD's internal accounting systems as outdated and inadequate.

Accountancy Age stated in October 2003 that Andreasen's spell at the OECD ended with "her bid to take the organisation to the European Court of Justice claiming her human rights had been violated as she had not been given a 'fair trial' following allegations of racism, and that she raised 'undue doubts' and unsupported 'alarmist allegations' in relation to OECD accounts."

The OECD never confirmed allegations of racism were part of the cause for her suspension. Andreasen had already dismissed those in Accountancy magazine in October 2000 ("Andreasen claims allegations against her emerged only after she had raised concerns about the accounts").

=== Brussels ===
In January 2002, she began her new job in Brussels as Chief Accountant ("budget execution director and accounting officer"), the first professional accountant hired.

==== Concerns over EU's accounting ====
Andreasen criticised the EU's accounting system for being open to fraud. She raised her criticisms and proposals for overdue improvements and changes internally, but made no progress with her superior. She then submitted her report to Commissioner Michaele Schreyer and Commission President Romano Prodi. She again received no answers and so approached members of the EU Parliament's Budget Control Committee.

She, consequently, refused to sign off the 2001 European Commission accounts. In the discharge procedure in 2003 the Commission promised comprehensive reform.

At this stage the media began to investigate and to report. Andreasen went public with her concerns on 1 August 2002.

==== Sacking ====
Andreasen was fully suspended from her job by the Commission in May 2002 (for "violating Articles 12 and 21 of staff regulations, failure to show sufficient loyalty and respect"). She is said to have been suspended from her job and ultimately fired because she refused to sign accounts she believed were unreliable.

== Political career ==
In 2007 Andreasen became the Treasurer of the UK Independence Party (UKIP), which supported withdrawing the United Kingdom from the European Union. In the 2009 elections to the European Parliament she was elected as a UKIP member of the European Parliament for South East England and immediately joined the Parliament's influential Committee on Budgetary Control, although the European People's Party group blocked her bid to become a vice-chair of it. In September 2009, she resigned from her post as Treasurer of UKIP.

In April 2010, Andreasen announced her intention to apply for the vacant position of Director-General of the European Anti-Fraud Office (OLAF), but there was no subsequent report that she had actually sent in such an application.

After what she considered a disappointing election result for UKIP in the local elections of May 2011, Andreasen called for her leader Nigel Farage to resign. The party responded that it had made gains in the election and that her statement "displays what one might perhaps charitably call a naivety in its analysis of the UK electoral scene". During a TV interview, Farage himself responded that Andreasen was out of touch and "didn't know what she was talking about".

In November 2011, she told RTÉ Radio 1's Morning Ireland that the Irish government's nomination of Kevin Cardiff to the European Court of Auditors should be withdrawn.

In February 2013, she defected from UKIP to the Conservative Party, describing leader Nigel Farage as "a Stalinist" who was "anti-women".

She lost her seat at the 2014 election.

== See also ==
- Accountability in the European Union
- List of books on European Union
- Paul van Buitenen
- Resignation of the Santer Commission
- Whistleblower

== Bibliography ==
- Marta Andreasen: Brussels Laid Bare, St Edwards Press, 2009. ISBN 978-0-9554188-1-5.
