= Cor van Hout =

Dutch criminal (1957–2003)

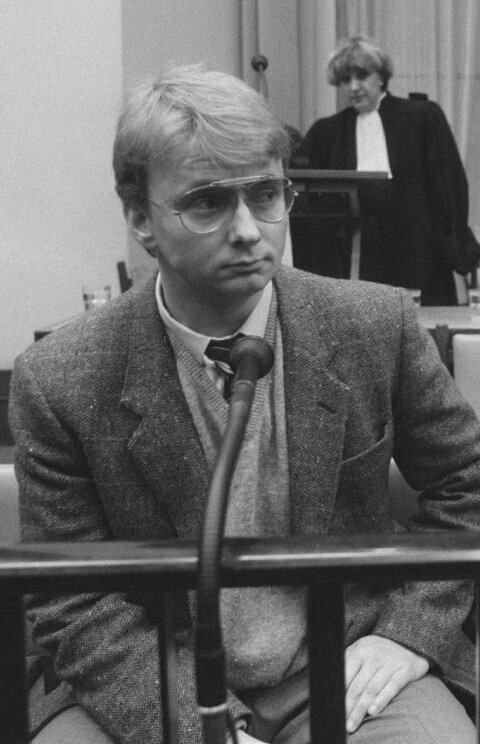
Cor van Hout in the Palace of Justice (Amsterdam)

Cornelis van Hout (18 August 1957 – 24 January 2003) was a Dutch criminal and the mastermind of the kidnapping of beer magnate Freddy Heineken.

== Life ==
=== Kidnapping and imprisonment ===
During the abduction, Van Hout collaborated with Willem Holleeder, Frans Meijer, Martin Erkamps and Jan Boellaard. The five men abducted Freddy Heineken and his driver Ab Doderer in front of Heineken's office on 9 November 1983, after which they held the two men for a period of three weeks in a Quonset hut in Westpoort, a part of Amsterdam, demanding a 35 million guilders ransom for Heineken.

After the release of the hostages on 30 November, Van Hout and Holleeder managed to flee to Paris. However, the two men were arrested by the French police on 29 February 1984. They fought extradition to the Netherlands and were at first placed under house arrest in a hotel on 6 December 1985, before being transferred on 13 February 1986 first to Guadeloupe, then to Saint Barthélemy, then to the French part of Saint Martin, then to Île Tintamarre, then again to Guadeloupe. Finally, they were taken back to Europe, where they were at first held in a hotel in Évry before being brought to a French prison. They were finally extradited to the Netherlands on 31 October 1986.

On 19 February 1987, Van Hout and Holleeder were both sentenced to eleven years in prison, with deduction of the time they had already spent in confinement.

Shortly after his release, Van Hout was jailed once again, this time for four years, for his role in a drug smuggling ring.

After two earlier failed attempts, Van Hout was assassinated on 24 January 2003 in Amstelveen, a year after being freed a second time, and had a "mafia-style" funeral, with a white hearse pulled by eight Friesian horses leading a procession of 15 white limousines.

In July 2019, his former friend and brother-in-law Willem Holleeder was convicted and sentenced to life for his involvement in a series of murders, including ordering the assassination of Van Hout and the manslaughter of a person who was accompanying Van Hout at the time of the assassination.
