= Ferry (2021 film) =

2021 Belgian-Dutch film

- Theatrical release poster
- Directed by: Cecilia Verheyden
- Written by: Nico Moolenaar; Bart Uytdenhouwen
- Starring: Frank Lammers; Elise Schaap; Huub Stapel
- Production company: deMENSEN
- Distributed by: Netflix
- Release date: 14 May 2021 (Netherlands)
- Running time: 106 minutes
- Countries: Netherlands, Belgium
- Language: Dutch

Ferry is a 2021 Belgo-Dutch film directed by Cecilia Verheyden, written by Nico Moolenaar and Bart Uytdenhouwen and starring Frank Lammers, Elise Schaap and Huub Stapel. The film serves as a prequel to the Netflix series Undercover.

== Cast ==
- Frank Lammers as Ferry Bouman
- Elise Schaap as Danielle van Marken
- Huub Stapel as Ralph Brink
- Raymond Thiry as John Zwart
- Monic Hendrickx as Claudia Zwart-Bouman
- Huub Smit as Dennis de Vries
- Juliette van Ardenne as Keesje Bouwman
