= Faithfully Yours (2022 film) =

2022 Dutch film directed by André van Duren

- Theatrical release poster
- Directed by: André van Duren
- Written by: Elisabeth Lodeizen; Paul Jan Nelissen; André van Duren
- Produced by: Rachel van Bommel
- Starring: Bracha van Doesburgh; Nasrdin Dchar; Gijs Naber; Elise Schaap
- Cinematography: Josje van Erkel
- Edited by: Tim Wijbenga
- Music by: Laurens Goedhart; Fons Merkies
- Distributed by: Dutch FilmWorks
- Release dates: 22 December 2022 (Spain); 17 May 2023 (Netflix)
- Running time: 95 minutes
- Country: Netherlands
- Language: Dutch
- Box office: $1.8 million

Faithfully Yours is a 2022 Dutch thriller film directed by André van Duren. The film won the Golden Film award after having sold 100,000 tickets. Bracha van Doesburgh and Elise Schaap play lead roles.

== Plot ==
Bodil, a judge, and her friend Isabel take a weekend trip to Ostend, Belgium and plan to be each other's alibis while having affairs without their husbands' knowledge. Upon arrival, Isabel goes to a club while Bodil attends a lecture by Michael Samuels. Bodil is in possession of Isabel's phone and is responsible for communicating with Isabel's husband Luuk, via texts to keep up appearances.

After the lecture, Bodil invites Michael over to her home to spend the night. In the morning when Luuk calls to tell his wife that he fell down the stairs and broke his ankle, Bodil says she's in the shower and takes the message. Bodil calls Isabel on her burner phone and informs her about her husband's injury. She leaves a house key under the mat and Isabel's phone on the table for her to retrieve on her way back to the Netherlands.

While sitting on the beach, Bodil tells Michael that what they have is not serious and that if she saw him on the street she would pretend to not know him. Offended, he leaves and she goes into the ocean for a swim. Upon her return home she discovers a large pool of blood on the floor, broken pottery items strewn around, and Isabel missing. The police arrive and discover that the blood type matches Isabel's and question Bodil. She tells them about being with Michael during the time of the murder, but he later denies the affair.

Isabel's phone is located and in it the police discover a photo of Isabel lying on the floor with her throat cut, a text with the name "Zadkin", and an anonymous hitman saying that the mission has been accomplished. Police speculate that Isabel was killed with an iron wire such as a piano string.

Bodil disregards a book titled "Night Walker" that she receives in the mail. She tells her husband Milan about Isabel's affair but when she tries to tell Luuk about Isabel staying at a hotel during their trip, he doesn't believe it and says he installed a tracker on her phone. A lawyer hired by Bodil learns about Isabel's affair and takes her to the police station to make a statement, where she is asked to not leave the country.

Bodil goes to see Michael again and asks why he didn't tell the police about their brief time together, and he says he thought that was what she wanted. But after he hears about the murder, he offers to withdraw his statement with the police and shares his contact information with her.

The police obtain a camera recording of Isabel at the hotel kissing Bodil's sister Yara and arrest her. Bodil admits to Milan that she wanted Isabel to break up with Luuk as he was suffocating her. Yara is out on bail, and gives a taser to Bodil for protection and suggests that Bodil may have been the intended target instead of Isabel.

Bodil's son calls her about his essay on his dad's laptop and gives her the password. She is shocked to see a live video feed of herself in the living room and locates a webcam on the ceiling. Unable to sleep that night, she gets up and finds a folder on Milan's laptop with video camera logs showing herself with multiple men. She takes the laptop to the police station to implicate Milan, but the folder is surprisingly empty when she accesses it.

Bodil hails a taxi and goes to Michael's place where she sees a piano with a missing note. Suspicious of him, she leaves his apartment in a hurry and finds Milan waiting for her outside. He takes her home and gives her a sleeping pill that she pretends to take but secretly spits out. She goes to find Luuk and sees him passed out on the balcony of an apparent suicide attempt. Milan convinces her to not call an ambulance as he is a doctor and saves him. Suspecting that Milan wanted her dead for cheating, she tases him and ties his hands behind his back. Milan says he enjoys watching her with other men, but is only interested in her, and asks her to free him.

As Bodil goes to call an ambulance for Luuk, she notices the "Night Walker" book she had received in the mail was authored by Luuk and its main character is named "Zadkin". Luuk appears and confesses he hired a hitman to kill Bodil but mistakenly Isabel was killed. Luuk tries to attack Bodil but she flees out the door and into the sea with him carrying an axe in close pursuit. She overpowers and drowns him.

Police arrive at the scene and exonerate Bodil, declaring the killing of Luuk to be legitimate self-defense. They return Yara's passport to Bodil and she drives to Yara's residence but is told that she just left for the private airport. Bodil rushes there and sees Yara boarding a plane with Isabel who is very much alive. Isabel explains that she discovered the arranged hit on Bodil's life by Luuk, but increased the hitman's fee to spare Bodil. Then with Yara's help she faked her death to be free of Luuk and run away with Yara. Bodil is thankful to see Isabel, gives Yara her passport, and asks her to take care of Isabel.

== Cast ==
- Bracha van Doesburgh as Bodil Backer
- Nasrdin Dchar as Milan Saber
- Gijs Naber as Luuk Luijten
- Elise Schaap as Isabel Luijten

== Filming ==
Principal photography began in April 2022.

== Release ==
The film was theatrically released in the Netherlands on 22 December 2022 and on Netflix on 17 May 2023.

== Reception ==
=== Box office ===
Faithfully Yours grossed $1.8 million in the Netherlands.
