= Elise Schaap =

Dutch actress (born 1982)

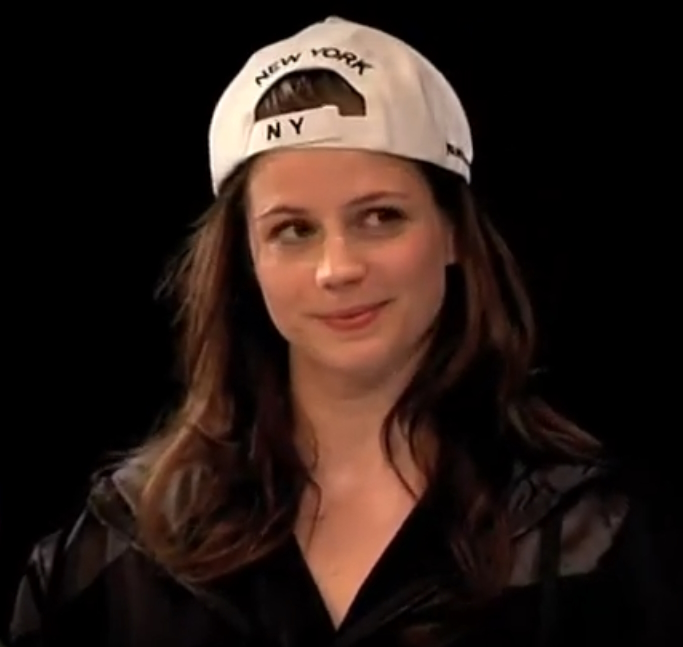
- Schaap in 2012
- Born: 21 September 1982 (age 44); Papendrecht
- Occupation: Actress
- Notable work: Undercover
- Children: 1

Elise Schaap (born 21 September 1982) is a Dutch actress.

== Career ==
Elise Schaap acts in television series and films. In the popular television series Familie Kruys, she played a pregnant Romanian bride. Schaap played the girlfriend of a drug kingpin in the series Undercover, reprising her role in the 2021 film Ferry. It was announced in 2021 that Schaap would star in the first Dutch Netflix original comedy series. She also starred in the films My Father Is an Airplane (2021), Hotel Sinestra (2022) and Faithfully Yours (2022).

== Personal life ==
Schaap was born in Papendrecht. Her family then moved to Rotterdam when she was six. From age 15, she worked in a tanning salon. She studied at the Academy of Theatre and Dance in Amsterdam and gave birth to a daughter in 2015.

== Awards and recognition ==
Schaap won Best Actress at Monte-Carlo Television Festival (2011) for The Swing Girls (together with Andrea Osvárt and Lotte Verbeek). She was nominated for the 2014 Golden Calf for Best Supporting Role in Afscheid van de Maan. In 2021, she won the Televizier-Ster award for the third year in a row.

== Filmography ==
=== Film ===
Year	Title	Role
2022	Faithfully Yours	Isabel
2022	Stromboli	Sara
2021	Mijn vader is een vliegtuig	Eva
2021	Ferry	Danielle
2019	Wat is dan liefde	Cato
2019	April, May en June	May
2017	Weg van jou	Esther
2015	Ja, ik wil!	Roos
2014	Afscheid van de maan	Mary
2013	Valentino	Monique
2013	Matterhorn	Trudy
2012	Jackie	Rosa
2010	Le ragazze dello swing	Kitty
2009	Sekjoeritie	Tjitske
2008	Bride Flight	Marjorie
2006	Liefde, dood & luchtgitaar	Laura

=== Television ===
Year	Title	Role
2025	Dood spoor	Dr Anna O
2023	Ferry de Serie	Danielle Bouman
2023	Bla Bla Bla met Schaap	Presenter
2022	Make Up Your Mind	herself
2021	Drag Race Holland	herself
2021	De Casting Kantine	herself
2020	I.M.	Leonie Smit
2020	Barrie Barista En Het Einde Der Tijden	Lilian
2020-heden	Nieuw zeer	o.a. Vlogger Hymke
2019-heden	Undercover	Danielle Bouman
2017-2018	Soof: een nieuw begin	Josine
2016-heden	De TV Kantine	multiple: Sylvie Meis, Chantal Janzen, Estelle Cruijff, Lil' Kleine, Maan, Olcay Gulsen, Nikkie Plessen, Famke Louise, Britt Dekker, Miljuschka Witzenhausen and Samantha Steenwijk.
2015-2019	Familie Kruys	Ruxandra
2014	Welkom bij de Romeinen	Yvonne Jasperia
2013	Koefnoen	Koningin Máxima en Chantal Janzen
2013	Doris	Maya
2012	Welkom in de Gouden Eeuw	Lidewij
2012	De vloer op	
2012-heden	Het Klokhuis	Kassameisje Samantha
2011	Hart tegen Hard	Ava Berendsen
2009	De vloer op	
2007	Keyzer & De Boer Advocaten	Annabel Prior
2005	Hotnews.nl	Maja
2004	Bitches	Chloe (1 afl.)
