= Morrison Gets a Baby Sister =

2008 Dutch family film

- Theatrical release poster
- Directed by: Barbara Bredero
- Screenplay by: Sjoerd Kuyper
- Produced by: Burny Bos; Michiel de Rooij; Sabine Veenendaal
- Starring: Barry Atsma; Bracha van Doesburgh; Kees Boot
- Cinematography: Han Wennink
- Edited by: Elsbeth Kasteel
- Music by: Martijn Schimmer
- Production companies: Bos Bros. Film-TV Productions; AVRO
- Distributed by: Warner Bros. Pictures
- Release date: 23 April 2008
- Running time: 71 minutes
- Country: Netherlands
- Language: Dutch
- Box office: $670,833

Morrison Gets a Baby Sister (Dutch: Morrison krijgt een zusje) is a 2008 Dutch family film directed by Barbara Bredero, produced by Burny Bos and written by Sjoerd Kuyper.

The film was released in the Netherlands by Warner Bros. Pictures on 23 April 2008, where it grossed only over $670,833 at the box office. The film received positive reviews from critics.

== Synopsis ==
5-year-old Morrison Glas is a lonely troublemaker who lives with his mother Nina and his father Steven. Nina is pregnant with his sister Simone and is expecting soon. One day, Morrison mishears a conversation that her sister is going to have his room, and from comments made by his parents, he draws the conclusion that after his sister is born, he will have leave his parents and move in with his religious aunt at the monastery. Morrison thinks of plans to get rid of Simone after she is born.

== Cast ==
- Tobias Lamberts as Morrison Glas
- Barry Atsma as Steven Glas
- Bracha van Doesburgh as Nina Glas
- Kees Boot as Motoragent

== Release ==
=== Home media ===
The film was released on DVD by Warner Home Video on 10 September 2008.
