= The Pocket-knife =

1992 Dutch film by Ben Sombogaart

Het Zakmes
- Theatrical release poster
- Directed by: Ben Sombogaart
- Screenplay by: Sjoerd Kuyper
- Based on: Het Zakmes by Sjoerd Kuyper
- Produced by: Burny Bos
- Starring: Olivier Tuinier; Adelheid Roosen; Genio De Groot; Verno Romney
- Cinematography: Reinier van Brummelen
- Edited by: Herman P. Koerts
- Music by: Roger Verhaart; Karel von Kleist
- Production companies: Bos Bros. Film-TV Productions; AVRO
- Distributed by: Hungry Eye Pictures
- Release date: 15 October 1992
- Running time: 90 minutes
- Country: Netherlands
- Language: Dutch

The Pocket-knife (Dutch: Het Zakmes), also known as The Penknife, is a 1992 Dutch children's film directed by Ben Sombogaart and written by Sjoerd Kuyper, based on his novel Het Zakmes. The film won several awards, including a Golden Calf Best Director Award.

== Plot ==
The story is about a 6-year-old boy named Mees Grobben who tries to return his friend Tim's penknife but faces difficulties because Tim has moved to Flevoland. He has to keep his quest a secret because he is forbidden to carry a knife. Eventually, he enters a talent contest, hoping to get a message to his friend through a song.

== Cast ==
- Olivier Tuinier as Mees Grobben
- Adelheid Roosen as Mees' moeder
- Genio De Groot as Mees' vader
- Verno Romney as Tim
- Beppie Melissen as Strenge juf
- Maxim Hartman as Bert Boot
- Samantha Angenent as Majorette
- Priscilla Blanken as Majorette
- Roel Dekker as Postbode
- Esther Gast as Floormanager
- Sietze Greydanis as Jongen met viool
- Karin van Holst Pellekaan as Baliedame
- Jaap Hoogstra as Oudere heer
- Kees Hulst as Meneer Hollenberg
- Heleen Hummelen as Lokettiste
- Frits Jansma as Drukker
- Ellen Röhrman as Reizigster
- Sarah Sijlbing as Cynthia
- Sebastiaan Spaan as Eduard
- Maria Tap as Haastige mevrouw
- Wil van der Meer as Muziekwinkelier
- Almara van Gijn as Majorette
- Kirsten Wilkeshuis as Meisje met gitaar

== Release ==
=== Critical response ===
The film received positive reviews from critics.

=== Home media ===
The film was released on VHS on 23 February 1994 by Stichting Timboektoe through Warner Home Video.
