= Kidnapping Freddy Heineken =

2015 film directed by Daniel Alfredson

- U.S. theatrical release poster
- Directed by: Daniel Alfredson
- Screenplay by: William Brookfield
- Based on: Kidnapping Freddy Heineken by Peter R. de Vries
- Produced by: Judy Cairo; Howard Meltzer; Michael A. Simpson
- Starring: Anthony Hopkins; Sam Worthington; Jim Sturgess; Ryan Kwanten
- Cinematography: Fredrik Bäckar
- Edited by: Håkan Karlsson
- Music by: Clay Duncan; Lucas Vidal
- Production companies: European Film Company; Informant Europe SPRL; Umedia
- Distributed by: Signature Entertainment (United Kingdom); A-Film Benelux (Netherlands)
- Release dates: 18 January 2015 (Netherlands); 3 April 2015 (United Kingdom)
- Running time: 95 minutes
- Countries: United Kingdom; Netherlands
- Language: English

Kidnapping Freddy Heineken (U.S. title Kidnapping Mr. Heineken) is a 2015 British-Dutch crime drama film directed by Daniel Alfredson based on the 1983 kidnapping of Freddy Heineken. The screenplay, based on the 1987 book by Peter R. de Vries, was written by William Brookfield. The role of Freddy Heineken is played by Anthony Hopkins, with Sam Worthington as Willem Holleeder, Jim Sturgess as Cor van Hout, Ryan Kwanten as Jan Boellaard, Thomas Cocquerel as Martin Erkamps and Mark van Eeuwen as Frans Meijer.

== Plot ==
In 1983 Amsterdam, wannabe gangster friends Willem Holleeder, Cor van Hout, Jan Boellard, Martin Erkamps, and Frans Meijer kidnap Heineken owner Freddy Heineken in an attempt to obtain a high ransom for his return. Heineken's family pays the ransom, he is released and Willem and Cor flee to Paris and go into hiding. Cor calls his wife Sonja, leading to the kidnappers' capture.

== Cast ==
- Anthony Hopkins as Freddy Heineken
- Sam Worthington as Willem Holleeder
- Jim Sturgess as Cor van Hout
- Ryan Kwanten as Jan Boellard
- Jemima West as Sonja Holleeder
- Thomas Cocquerel as Martin Erkamps
- Mark van Eeuwen as Frans Meijer
- David Dencik as Ab Doderer
- Billy Slaughter as Junior Officer
- Eric Godon as The cop

== Production ==
Filming began in Belgium in October 2013. Most of the outside action scenes were filmed on location in Amsterdam.

== Reception ==
Kidnapping Mr. Heineken received generally unfavourable reviews from critics. The film has a 33/100 score at Metacritic and a 19% score at Rotten Tomatoes.

The Los Angeles Times commented, "Despite its true-events pedigree, Kidnapping Mr. Heineken is woefully captive to B-movie crime saga tropes."

Variety wrote, "About as appealing as day-old beer littered with cigarette butts, the abysmal caper drama Kidnapping Mr. Heineken is one of those international co-productions produced for all the right tax-credit reasons and none of the right artistic ones."

Frank Scheck of The Hollywood Reporter wrote, "By the time the relatively brief but seemingly interminable proceedings reach their conclusion, viewers may feel like they've been held hostage themselves." Conversely, Rex Reed of The New York Observer gave the film 3 out of 4 stars, and commented, "Anthony Hopkins plays the king of the hops, and he is excellent. So is the rest of the movie, a sober, no-frills account about the highest ransom ever collected up to that time—$10 million and counting."
