= My Father Is an Airplane =

2021 film by Antoinette Beumer

- Theatrical release poster
- Dutch: Mijn vader is een vliegtuig
- Directed by: Antoinette Beumer
- Screenplay by: Maaik Krijgsman
- Based on: Mijn vader is een vliegtuig by Antoinette Beumer
- Produced by: Frans van Gestel; Arnold Heslenfeld; Laurette Schillings
- Starring: Elise Schaap; Pierre Bokma; Stefan Rokebrand; Maarten Heijmans; Liz Snoyink; Lisa Smit; Marie-Louise Stheins; Axel Daeseleire; Ariane Schluter
- Cinematography: Danny Elsen
- Edited by: Axel Skovdal Roelofs; Lot Rosmark
- Music by: Joep Beving
- Production companies: Topkapi Films; VPRO
- Distributed by: September Film
- Release dates: 24 September 2021 (Netherlands Film Festival); 30 September 2021 (Netherlands)
- Running time: 92 minutes
- Country: Netherlands
- Language: Dutch
- Budget: $372,313

My Father Is an Airplane (Dutch: Mijn vader is een vliegtuig) is a 2021 Dutch psychological drama film directed by Antoinette Beumer from a screenplay by Maaik Krijgsman, based on the novel of the same name by Beumer. The film premiered as the opening film of the Netherlands Film Festival before its nationwide theatrical release. The film was nominated for three Golden Calf awards, including Best Feature Film and Best Leading Role (Elise Schaap). Both Algemeen Dagblad and NRC praised the film.
