= Paul van Buitenen =

Dutch politician (born 1957)

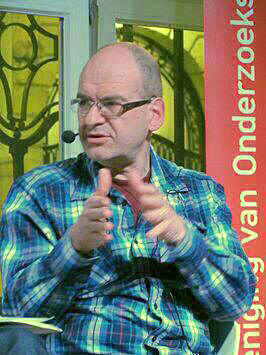

Leader of Europe Transparent in the European Parliament
- In office 20 July 2004 – 14 July 2009
- Preceded by: Position established
- Succeeded by: Position abolished

Member of the European Parliament
- In office 20 July 2004 – 14 July 2009
- Constituency: Netherlands

Personal details
- Born: 28 May 1957 (age 69) Breda, Netherlands
- Party: Europe Transparent; EG-EFA
- Website: (in Dutch) www.paulvanbuitenen.nl

Paul van Buitenen (Dutch pronunciation: [ˈpʌul vɑm ˈbœytənə(n)]; born 28 May 1957) is a retired Dutch politician of the Europe Transparent Party who served as a Member of the European Parliament from 2004 to 2009.

He was an assistant-auditor in the European Commission's Financial Control Directorate becoming the whistleblower who first drew the attention of a Member of the European Parliament to the irregularities, fraud and mismanagement within the Commission in 1998. In May 2005, he also asked the European Commission to create an investigation, after learning that Frits Bolkestein (author of the Directive on services in the internal market) was a member of the Russian Bank Menatep's international consultative council (owned by Mikhail Khodorkovsky) and that he had worked for the Shell British-Dutch petrol company, two firms "detaining secret accounts in Clearstream".

== 1998 whistleblowing ==
His whistleblowing on 9 December 1998 indirectly led to the resignation of the Commission presided by Jacques Santer (who has also been prime minister of Luxembourg) and the fall of Édith Cresson. For this, he was suspended, had his salary halved and ordered to face disciplinary action. He fought on and the combination of his exposures with the public indignation of his treatment by the Commission triggered the collapse of Jacques Santer's Commission, of which Édith Cresson was particularly criticised.

Eventually he was – at least partially – forgiven and returned to the organisation, albeit in a different capacity. Nevertheless, he would later leave on 'unpaid leave' in order to pursue a political career.

He has been named 'European of the Year' by Reader's Digest magazine and the Australian Broadcasting Corporation. He donated his prize money to a fund in the Netherlands for helping other whistleblowers and in 1999 he wrote a book which reveals the whole story – followed by a sequel in 2004. The second book only came out in Dutch and German. An English version risked causing trouble with Commissioner Neil Kinnock.

== 2006 whistleblowing ==
On 26 April 2006, daily 20 Minutes revealed that "in May 2005, MEP Paul van Buitenen was shocked by Frits Bolkestein's presence to Menatep's international consultative council, a sulfurous Russian banking establishment, and by his work for Shell, British-Dutch petrol company. Two firms 'detaining secret accounts in Clearstream' ... van Buitenen, also Dutch, then asked for 'clarification' to the European Commission and the opening of a parliamentary investigation. The Commission's president, José Manuel Barroso, answered that these facts "don't bring up any new question" and that it is not known "if Menatep took contact with Bolkestein while he was in his functions". No investigation thereby took place." The free daily underlines that "in 2001, it was Bolkestein himself that announced the Commission's refusal to open up a parliamentary investigation on Clearstream", following Harlem Désir's requests and accusations that Menatep had an "undeclared account" at Clearstream. Bolkestein refused to answer any questions by the newspaper.

== 2008 whistleblowing ==
On 5 March 2008, Paul van Buitenen published on his website a summary of a confidential internal report dealing with abuse of the EU expenses and staff allowance system.

== Transparency and current functions ==
Pledging to continue the fight against fraud and bureaucratic inefficiency on the European level, Van Buitenen founded a party named Europe Transparent, ran with it for the European Parliament in the 2004 elections (in the Netherlands) and won two seats for his party. Van Buitenen joined the Greens-EFA group in the European Parliament as an independent member.

His functions in the European Parliament were

- Member of the Committee on Budgetary Control,
- Substitute for the Committee on Petitions and
- Substitute for the Delegation for relations with Switzerland, Iceland and Norway and to the European Economic Area (EEA) Joint Parliamentary Committee.

In 2007, he submitted a parliamentary question, along with Hannu Takkula (ALDE) and Paulo Casaca (PSE), accusing Iranian president Mahmoud Ahmadinejad of incitement to genocide (based on statements that the "Regime [Israel] that is occupying Qods [Jerusalem] must be eliminated from the pages of history") and urging the European Commission to take action.

On 29 January 2008 Van Buitenen announced that his party Europe Transparent was to be dissolved and that he personally intended to join the ChristianUnion.

After the European elections of June 2009 Van Buitenen returned to the European Commission, this time in DG RTD, at a stone's throw from the European Parliament. He checked for possible irregularities in Framework 7 contracts, under acting Head of Unit Peter Baader, a former OLAF official.

Van Buitenen has retired as an EU official in mid-2011.

== Quotes ==
- "The European Anti-Fraud Office (OLAF) has had success in combating external corruption in the member states, but it is in the internal cases where it has found problems. Working with the EU authorities makes it very difficult to proceed in an investigation ... OLAF's independence exists only on paper ... Every time the committee is approached about corruption, it promises to improve the situation. But then a new case arises.
  ... We must decide if we are to continue with the European arrangement. If we do, then we must also create these democratic structures at European level. Otherwise we should revert to allowing the national authorities and parliaments to take over the controlling functions again. But at the moment, as it stands, everything goes wrong.
  ... Things have got even worse. There is now a regulation which supposedly protects so-called whistleblowers which makes officials believe that they can uncover scandals. But in reality, if one does this, they are destroyed. So the regulation does not work."
  (Deutsche Welle, 2 April 2007)

== Books ==
=== By van Buitenen ===
- Paul van Buitenen: In de loopgraven van Brussel: de slag om een transparant Europa, Ten Have, 2004, pp. 128–153. ISBN 90-259-5422-7.
- Paul van Buitenen: Blowing the Whistle: Fraud in the European Commission, Politicos Pub, 2000, ISBN 1-902301-46-3, ISBN 978-1-902301-46-4

=== Related ===
- Andreas Oldag, Hans-Martin Tillack: Raumschiff Brüssel – Wie die Demokratie in Europa scheitert (in German, Spaceship Brussels – How Democracy in Europe fails), Argon Verlag, 2003 (1st ed., hardcover), ISBN 3-87024-578-6, ISBN 978-3-87024-578-8 / Fischer, Frankfurt 2004 (2nd ed.) ISBN 3-596-15746-3, ISBN 978-3-596-15746-4

== See also ==
- Accountability in the European Union
- Clearstream scandal
- List of books on the European Union
- Marta Andreasen
