= Jens-Peter Bonde =

Danish politician (1948–2021)

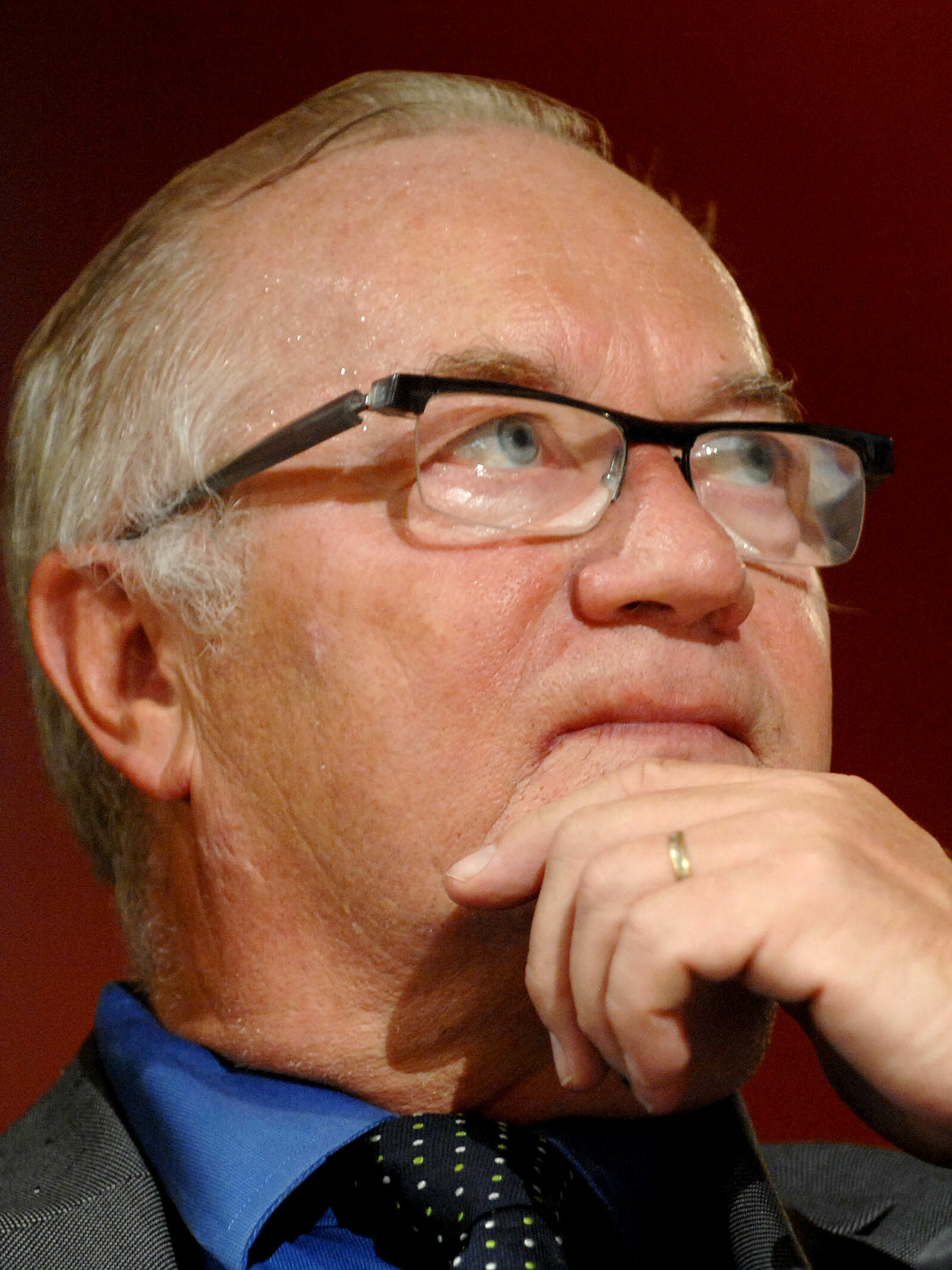
- Bonde in 2007
- Born: 27 March 1948; Aabenraa, Denmark
- Died: 4 April 2021 (aged 73)
- Occupation: Politician
- Years active: 1979–2008
- Political party: June Movement

Jens-Peter Rossen Bonde (27 March 1948 – 4 April 2021) was a Danish politician who served as Member of the European Parliament (MEP) with the June Movement. He resigned as an MEP in May 2008. Bonde was elected to the European Parliament in the first election in 1979 with the People's Movement against the EU. He was re-elected 6 times consecutively. In 1992 he co-founded the June Movement which he chaired until his retirement in May 2008.

Jens-Peter Bonde emerged from the Danish Left of the 1970s, however he was on the centre-left for much of his life. In November 2005 he was the inspiration behind the setting up of a new Party at a European level, EUDemocrats. He was its president from 2005 to 2009.

Bonde wrote over 60 books on the EU, including editions of EU treaties with additional commentary.

== Family ==
Jens-Peter Bonde is the son of Nina Bonde and Nis Bonde. He was married to Lisbeth Kirk, editor-in-chief of the independent online newspaper EUobserver. Jens-Peter has four sons and two grandchildren.

== Retirement ==
On 25 March 2008, Bonde announced his retirement from the European Parliament. Bonde intended to spend more time encouraging the growth of parties similar to the June Movement in the rest of Europe and building the EUDemocrats. He was also working for referendums on the Treaty of Lisbon. Bonde resigned his seat on 9 May 2008 and was replaced by Hanne Dahl, who was second on the June Movement's list of candidates in the 2004 election. In January 2009 Bonde resigned as President of the EUDemocrats and was succeeded by Sören Wibe.

== Education ==
- 1966: Advanced school-leaving certificate
- 1966–1974: Studied political science at the Aarhus University

== Career ==
- 1963–1973: Member Danish Social Liberal Party's Youth
- 1974–1979: Editor, Notat
- 1975–1992: Member of the Danish Communist Party
- 1972: Co-founder of the People's Movement against the EU
- 1991: Co-founder of Denmark 92
- 1992: Co-founder, and spokesperson (1992–2008) of the June Movement
- 1979–2008: Member of the European Parliament
- 1992–1994: Chairman of the Delegation for relations with Iceland
- 1994–1995 Member of the Tindemans group
- Co-Chairman (1994–1997) and Chairman (1997–1999) of the Europe of Nations Group
- 1999–2004: Chairman of the Group for a Europe of Democracies and Diversities
- Chairman of the Independence/Democracy Group
- Co-founder of the Intergroup SOS Democracy
- Co-founder of the Intergroup Eurosun
- 1992: Co-founder of TEAM
- 2004: Co-founder of Friends of Clean Accounts, The Referendum Group
- 2005: Co-founder of EUDemocrats – Alliance for a Europe of Democracies, a former European political party
- 2007: Co-founder of Foundation for EU Democracy, a former European political foundation
- 2009: Advisor to Declan Ganley for the European election 2009

== See also ==
- 2004 European Parliament election in Denmark
