= Sjoerd Kuyper =

Dutch poet and author (1952–2026)

- Born: 6 March 1952; Amsterdam, Netherlands
- Died: 22 September 2026 (aged 74); Bergen, Netherlands
- Writing career
- Notable awards: Theo Thijssen-prijs 2012

Sjoerd Kuyper (6 March 1952 – 22 September 2026) was a Dutch poet and author known for his work in adult, children, and young adult literature as well as his work in theatre, television series, screenplays and lyrics. His best-known works are the film The Pocket-knife (Het Zakmes), the series of books about the toddler Robin, the poem Mensen met koffers (People with Suitcases), the lyrics Hallo wereld (Hello World) and the youth novels Hotel De Grote L (The Big L Hotel) and Bizar (Bizarre). His books have been published in fifteen countries. He won, among other things, six Zilveren Griffels and a Gouden Griffel for Robin en God (Robin and God). In 2012 he was awarded the Theo Thijssen Prijs award for his entire oeuvre, and in 2014 he was appointed Officer in the Orde van Oranje-Nassau for his merits in Dutch literature at home and abroad.

== Early life ==
Sjoerd Kuyper was born in Amsterdam on 6 March 1952. At two years old, he moved with his parents to Berkhout, near Hoorn, where his father became a teacher. Kuyper has described the seven years he spent there in his series of books about the toddler Robin. In 1956, his sister Trudy was born.

In 1961, the family moved to Oostvoorne, on the South Holland islands, where one year later, on Kuyper's tenth birthday, his brother Hans was born. In Oostvoorne, Kuyper, who was thirteen years old, started writing stories inspired by Jules Verne, as well as poetry. He attended the Hogere Burgerschool (HBS) in Brielle and published in the school newspaper, of which he was also an editor.

In 1967 the family moved to Winkel, North Holland and Kuyper attended the HBS in Schagen. In Winkel he and his friends started a publishing house, Walpurgisnacht, which brought stencilled books with their own work to the market. In that period, Kuyper published a story in Het Noordhollands Dagblad and a poem in De Groene Amsterdammer. A poem he had published in the school newspaper was included in the national anthology een 10 voor tieners (a 10 for the teenagers), and he wrote a song, "De NAVO Blues" (The NATO Blues), which he sang with friends in the TV programme Dit is het begin (this is the beginning). In 1969 he passed the HBS-A exam and left for Amsterdam to study philosophy.

In Amsterdam he met the young poets Hans Clavin, Robert Paul Flipse, Peter Nijmeijer and Hans van Weely. Together with Leo Bankersen as the designer they started the Fizz-Subvers Press. Initially only their own work was published, but later collections of Bert Schierbeek, Sybren Polet, Guus Luijters and Ben Borgart were also published, as well as translations by Dadaist and surrealist poets. On 11 July 1970, Kuyper met Margje Burger in the Alkmaarder Hout, where he read poetry during the interval of a pop concert. They have been together ever since.

== First years of writing ==
Kuyper and Burger moved into a summer house in the garden of Peter Nijmeijer, who had gone to live in Nieuwe Niedorp. Kuyper occasionally travelled to Amsterdam, because of his studies, and published in obscure Flemish magazines and very occasionally in Propria Cures. His breakthrough came when Hans Verhagen got involved with his poems and offered them to De Bezige Bij. The collection Ik herinner mij Klaas Kristiaan (I remember Klaas Kristiaan) appeared in 1974. Kuyper became a board member, editor and organiser of poetry readings on behalf of the publishing company ‘Ontmoet de dichters’ ('Meet the poets'). In the year of his debut, he read from his work at Poetry International.

He gave up his studies and became a full-time writer: editorials and poetry reviews for De Nieuwe Linie, articles in de VPRO Gids, reviews on puppetry in De Volkskrant. He translated books written by J.M. Synge and Jamake Highwater, among others, and wrote his first children's stories for the radio programme De Ko de Boswachtershow. In 1975, he and Burger moved to a houseboat in Neck, Wijdewormer.

In 1978, Kuyper wrote his first TV series, De Grote Klok (The Big Clock), with Jacques Vriens, and together with Burger as a photographer, he made reports about the Aran Islands, Brittany and New York for the magazine Bzzlletin. In 1980, Kuyper participated in the International Writing Program of the University of Iowa . He and Burger stayed there for four months and met fellow writers such as John Banville, Earl Lovelace and Leonard Nolens. In that same year, Kuyper and his sister Trudy, who became known as 'the queen of hand puppetry' with her puppet theatre Dibbes, founded publishing house Bobbelie and started to publish the puppet shows of puppet theatre Dibbes in book form as well. The first part was called De Boommannetjes (The Little Tree Men) The piece was written by Trudy, the text in prose by Kuyper. In the meantime he continued to publish with De Bezige Bij: two collections of poetry and two prose books.

And he did interviews, together with his friend Johan Diepstraten, first with young prose writers like Maarten 't Hart, Doeschka Meijsing and Jan Siebelink, later with young poets like H.H. ter Balkt, Frank Koenegracht, Gerrit Komrij, Hans Tentije and Willem Wilmink. They were published in De Nieuwe Linie and De Tijd, and later collected in Het Nieuwe Proza (1978) and Dichters (1980). The friendship with Diepstraten would later lead to a youth novel written together, De verborgen steeg (The Hidden Alley) (1986), which was awarded a prize by many children's juries. Diepstraten died in 1999, at the age of 48.

Burger and Kuyper married in 1976; they had a son born in 1984 and a daughter in 1986. Burger stopped photographing and started drawing and painting; she turned her darkroom into a nursery. Kuyper increasingly focused on puppetry – he wrote pieces for various theatres – and on children's books, which he published initially with In de Knipscheer, later with Bert Bakker, and from 1988 with Leopold. His first book there was Majesteit, uw ontbijt (Your Majesty, Your Breakfast) (1988) after the TV series of the same name that he had written for the VPRO. He wrote for several TV programs during this time: Max Laadvermogen (Max Load Capacity) (1986), De freules (Her Ladyships) (1990) and in 1991 the TV series and the film Het zakmes (The Pocket-knife), after the book he had published in 1981 with In de Knipscheer. The film and the series won fourteen prizes, in the Netherlands and abroad, including an Emmy Award, a Cinekid Award and a Gouden Kalf for Ben Sombogaart's direction, and the film was included in the Canon of the Dutch film. The book – rewritten according to the scenario – was reprinted numerous times.

Meanwhile, De Bezige Bij had a new editorial team that had no affinity with the work that Kuyper wrote for adults, so he transferred it to L.J. Veen.

== 1990s ==
In 1988, Kuyper, Burger, and their children moved to Bakkum. Kuyper shifted his focus towards writing books and giving lectures at schools, bookshops and local libraries.

In 1990 he published Robins zomer (Robin's summer), the first part of a series of autobiographical books about his toddler years in Berkhout, in which he also incorporated adventures and statements from his own children. Eight more volumes were to follow, three of which were awarded a Zilveren Griffel and one a Gouden Griffel. In 1996, he also published the philosophical children's novel De rode zwaan (The Red Swan), inspired by the forests of Bakkum, which he looked out over from his writing house at the back of the garden. The book was later adapted into a film, for which Kuyper wrote the screenplay. In 1989, the fairy tale Josje (Josie) was published, followed by the sequel Josjes droom (Josie's dream) in 1992.

In 1994, Kuyper was invited by the NANA Foundation to take part in the children's book weeks on Curaçao and Bonaire. Later trips to Aruba and the Windward Islands and Suriname followed. The experiences there have had a great influence on the life and work of Kuyper. "When I am there," he said in an interview, "I am a different person, a better person – my mother would not recognize me." It was not until later that Kuyper was able to write about the youth of the islands, but in 1998, together with Annemarie van Haeringen, he made the picture book Malmok, about a pelican, which was awarded a Gouden Penseel. The NANA Foundation published it in English, Papiamentu and Papiamento as the annual Children's Book Gift at the Antilles.

In 1997, they bought a house in Bergen. Kuyper wrote letters about the move and everything that preceded it, which he collected in 2004 in the booklet De weg naar Bergen (The Road to Bergen), later included in Kwaaie verhalen van liefde (Angry stories of love) (2014). After a Vlag en Wimpel, two Zilveren Griffels and one Gouden Griffel, Kuyper was asked by the CPNB to write the 2000 Dutch children's book week gift: Eiber!, a prose adaptation of the puppet play De Eiber that he had written for Trudy's theatre. Three hundred thousand copies were printed and distributed.

== 2000s ==
Director Peter de Baan asked Kuyper to write lyrics for the musical De scheepsjongens van Bontekoe (Java Ho! The Adventures of Four Boys Amid Fire, Storm, and Shipwreck), which was performed in 2003. In the course of this decade Kuyper would make contributions to eleven musicals, including lyrics and scenarios. He wrote the lyrics for the 2005 musical Turks fruit (Turkish Delight), based on Jan Wolkers' novel, and co-wrote the lyrics the 2009 musical Dromen zijn bedrog (Dreams don't come true) with Dick van den Heuvel. For these productions Kuyper won two John Kraaijkamp Musical Awards.

During this period, Burger and Kuyper started writing together, beginning in 2004 with the picture book Jij bent mijn mama niet! (You're not my mom!). They also wrote forty stories for a method of teaching Nature & Technology by publisher Malmberg (2009). More picture books followed, including Sjim and Sjon eten gek (Jim and John Eat Funny) (2009), Mama Lief Alsjeblieft (For You, Sweet Mama) (2014), Kom uit die boom (Get out of that tree) (2015), and stories from paintings for ‘Het grote Rijksmuseum voorleesboek ('The Big Rijksmuseum Reading Book'), ‘Het meisje met de parel ('The Girl with the Pearl Earring') from the Mauritshuis, ‘Rembrandts voorleesbijbel’ ('Rembrandt's Bible Stories') from the Rembrandthuis and ‘Het grote Rembrandt voorleesboek’ ('The Big Rembrandt Reading Book') from the Rijksmuseum.

Kuyper's father died in 2006. He wrote about his father's death in the collection September (2009) and narrated and sang about it in the musical theatre play Dode vaders, lieve zonen (Dead Fathers, Dear Sons), which he performed in 2010 and 2011. During this period he won two Zilveren Griffels, in addition to the two Musicals Awards. However, his sales steadily declined, and when he voiced his dissatisfaction with the state of affairs in the world of children's books in his Annie M.G. Schmidt speech, his new publisher was not amused and he asked Kuyper to publish his work elsewhere in the future. The collaboration lasted three years, producing three books and two additional Griffels.

== 2010s ==
During his time at Nieuw Amsterdam, Kuyper already contacted Hoogland & Van Klaveren publishers in Hoorn. He wanted Het boek van Josje (Josie's book), which had not been available for ten years and for which there was still a lot of demand, to be reprinted. In 2009 it appeared there under the name Josje (Josie). In 2011, Lemniscaat Publishers published Mijn opa de bankrover (My grandfather the bank robber), the story on which the film of the same name was based, which was released in the same year and became the first film written by Kuyper to be given a golden status: there were 150,000 paying visitors. Also in 2011, Lemniscaat released the last part of the series about Robin: O rode papaver, boem pats knal (O red poppy, boom pats pop!) for which Kuyper was awarded his fifth Zilveren Griffel.

The bond with Curaçao and Aruba became stronger. Ròi Colastica was looking for a coach to write his first Dutch-language youth novel and asked Kuyper for help. Together with Margje they worked on it for months, in Bergen and Willemstad. Kuyper reported on it in 'Twee harten op een tafel' (‘Two hearts on a table)’, recorded in Kwaaie verhalen van liefde (Angry stories of love). Ròi's book, Vuurwerk in mijn hoofd (Fireworks in My Head), was published by Leopold in 2012. Through long conversations with Ròi and his family and friends, Kuyper got to know the soul of Curaçao so well, that he finally found the courage to write a book about the children of the island. That was De duik (The Dive), which was published by Lemniscaat in 2014. Ròi later said: 'It is unbelievable that this book was written by a makamba'. In 2017, Kuyper wrote Aruba's children's book week gift Het spannendste boek van de wereld (The most thrilling book in the world), which was distributed to schoolchildren in a bilingual edition, Papiamento and Dutch, and in 2019, De duik (The Dive) was published in Papiamento and Papiamentu by Charuba publishing house.

In 2014 Mama Lief Alsjeblieft (For You, Dear Mama) was published, which he wrote together with Margje, and Kwaaie verhalen van liefde (Angry Stories on Love) and De vrienden van Sinterklaas (The Friends of Sinterklaas) and Hotel De Grote L (The Big L Hotel) saw the light of day. Kuyper celebrated his fortieth anniversary as a writer in the Ruïne church in Bergen with speeches and readings by friends and a performance by the Bintangs, and on that occasion, he was appointed Officier in de Orde van Oranje-Nassau. Hotel De Grote L was to be his greatest success to date: it was filmed, adapted twice for theatre, more than forty thousand copies were sold in the Netherlands, it ended up in the top ten of the CPNB and appeared in ten countries. Kuyper still traveled to Italy every year to give lectures on the book.

In 2018 there was a break with Lemniscaat Publishers. Neither party made any public announcements about the reason. Kuyper had occasionally continued to publish books with Hoogland & Van Klaveren - including the poetry collection Mooi leven (Beautiful Life) (2016), with paintings by Margje - and has now definitely made it his publisher, both with his work for young people and with that for adults. In March 2019 his youth novel Bizar (Bizarre) appeared.

== On the barricades ==
With socialist grandparents and parents, the work of Sjoerd Kuyper is not only characterised by poetic language, but also by social involvement. It started with his first publication, a poem in the Brielse school newspaper, the pacifist Thoughts of an ex-general, followed by NATO Blues, which he sang with friends in the shopping streets of Alkmaar and on TV in the late 1960s, and in MaGier and the MiddelMan (MaVulture and the MiddleMan) (1984) the evil aspects of the faith were denounced. The anger never disappeared. In fact, it was getting bigger and bigger. In his work but also elsewhere, as was the case with Astrid Lindgren and Miep Diekmann.

In the early 1990s, enormous mergers between schools took place in the field of education. The motto was that larger schools could offer more quality, but in reality, it was a matter of cutbacks. Kuyper opposed this increase in scale by means of local media and a submission in De Volkskrant, partly because the small and pleasant primary school of his children was in danger of being closed down. The struggle was lost. To the great sadness, still, of all those who worked and are working in education. Kuyper incorporated these experiences with local and national politics in his book De schoolstrijd (The School Struggle) (1997), later republished as De leukste jongen van de school (The Cutest Guy In School) (2002).

In 1994, he was asked to write a TV series about refugees and the fairy tales they had brought back from their country of birth: De zevenmijlskoffers (The Seven-Mile Suitcases). A number of stories from this series were included in the collection of short stories Alleen mijn verhalen nam ik mee (My Stories Are All I Brought) (1998) and the text of the title song that Kuyper had written for it, Mensen met koffers (People with suitcases), which was never used at the time, was shared as a poem thousands of times on the internet twenty years later, when the discussion about the admission of refugees in the Netherlands flared up. In 2012 he and Tjeerd Oosterhuis wrote a song on the same theme, Hallo wereld (Hello World) for Kinderen voor Kinderen (Children for Children), which has been watched and listened to more than twelve million times on YouTube.

Kuyper gave lectures such as Over het nieuwe publiceren en mijn oude schrijversneus (About the new way of publishing and my old writer's nose) (2009), Machiavelli en de Veertig Rooie Ruggen (Machiavelli and the Forty Thousand Euros) (2011) and Terug naar het Paradijs (Return to Paradise) (2015), in which he showed how important youth literature is and how bad it is to fob off its makers. They won him support and thanks from colleagues but since then - see above - it's only got worse.

The Zwarte Piet discussion (‘Black Pete’ debate) was a hot topic in the Netherlands. Kuyper was inspired by his children and their friends, who settled in his house from all directions, and their stories, and those of his grandchildren, who are half Surinamese, to write a book about how the Sinterklaasfeest could be festive for everyone, with [pieten in all colours: De vrienden van Sinterklaas (The Friends of Sinterklaas) (2014). This got him involved in the national discussion and when his opinion was asked about Het Sinterklaasjournaal and he said in Trouw that it was 'zum kotzen', so racist, that was not appreciated on the social media. As a reaction he wrote the books Het kleinste Pietje (The Smallest Pietje) (2015) and, at the request of the Stichting Sinterklaasintocht Amsterdam, Het verhaal van Sinterklaas (The Story of Sinterklaas) (2018). With composer Floor Minnaert he made the Sinterklaas song Al die kleuren (All those colours). Kuyper said in an interview: "I've fought a lot in my life and lost a lot, but this is a winner, although not everyone knows it yet. Those who are still in favour of Zwarte Piet will have a lot to explain to their grandchildren later on." After that, Kuyper's commitment withdrew to his books - see his most recent youth novels De duik and Bizar (The Dive and Bizarre).

== Death ==
Kuyper died in Bergen, North Holland on 22 September 2026, at the age of 74.

== List of works ==
=== Literature ===
- Het Zakmes (1981)
- De Rode Zwaan (1996)

=== Film ===
- The Pocket-knife (Het Zakmes, 1992) (screenplay)
- De Rode Zwaan (1999) (screenplay)
- Morrison krijgt een zusje (2008) (screenplay)
