= Bracha van Doesburgh =

Dutch actress (born 1981)

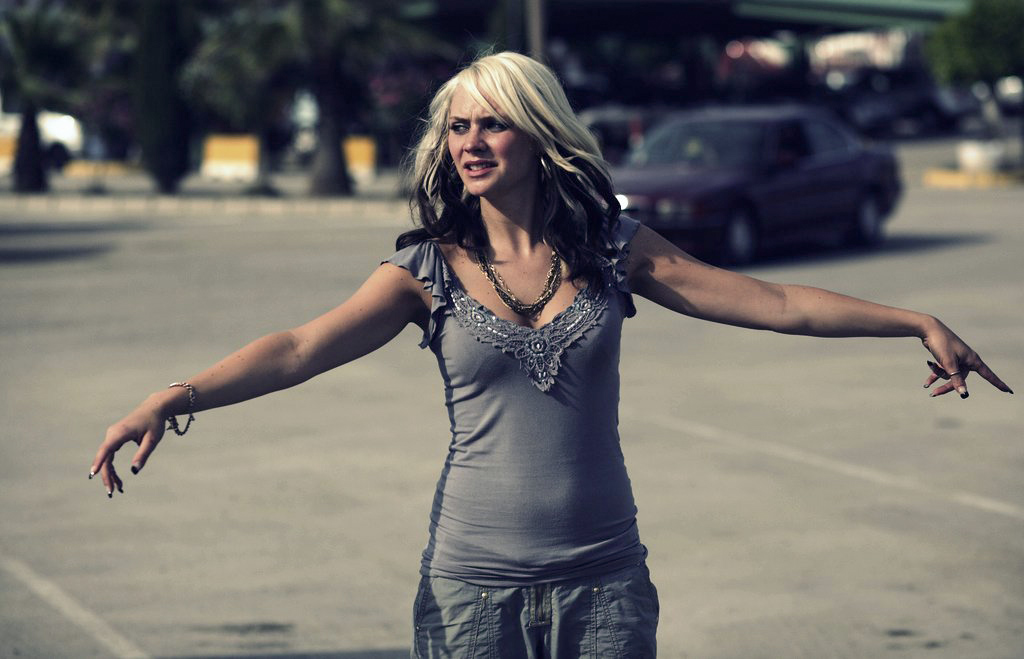
- Bracha van Doesburgh on the set during filming of Hitte/Harara in Algeciras, Spain
- Born: 2 September 1981 (age 44); Enschede, Netherlands
- Occupation: Actress

Bracha Semeyns de Vries van Doesburgh (born 2 September 1981) is a Dutch actress. She is well known for her film roles in Too Fat Too Furious, Het Schnitzelparadijs and Dick Maas's Moordwijven. On television, she portrayed Fatima in the prime time series S1NGLE.

Van Doesburgh studied theater in Amsterdam and took acting lessons in New York City. She is married to Dutch actor Daan Schuurmans and they have a daughter named Sophia and twins sons named Kees and Boris.

== Filmography ==
- Schnitzel Paradise (Het Schnitzelparadijs) (2005) - Agnes Meerman
- Too Fat Too Furious (Vet Hard) (2005) - Katja Wielaard
- For a few marbles more (Voor een paar knikkers meer) (2006) - mother of Sofie (voice)
- Morrison Gets a Baby Sister (2008) - Nina Glas
- The Dinner Club (2010) - Karen
- Faithfully Yours (2022)

== Trivia ==
- Both her acting (Grijpstra & De Gier (2004)) and theatrical debut (Vet hard (2005)) were in a production starring Jack Wouterse.
