= The United States of Europe, A Eurotopia? =

Book by Freddy Heineken

The United States of Europe, A Eurotopia? is a plan, advanced in 1992 by the Dutch beer brewer and pro-European political activist Freddy Heineken. He proposes a federal United States of Europe, in which larger European countries break into a number of smaller, more ethnically and linguistically homogeneous states.

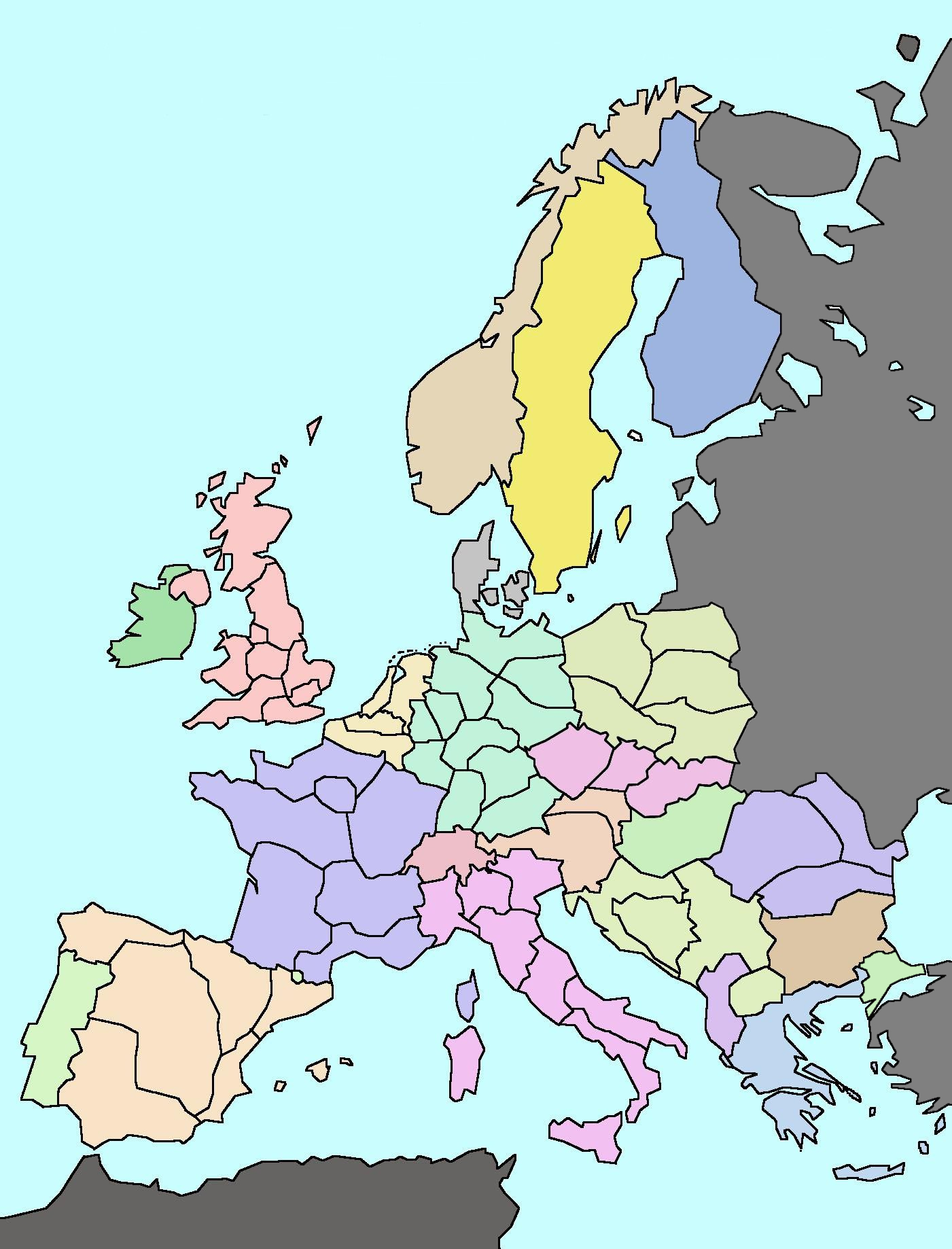
A slight variation of the map made by Heineken/Van den Doel/Wesseling

== The idea ==
The plan gives a division of Europe in regions. Heineken went for advice on the division to Henk Wesseling, who was Professor of History at the University of Leiden. The designs from the plan were left to the Leiden historian Wim van den Doel. Eurotopia takes ethnic sensitivities into account, to cause the least possible amount of friction. The basic idea is a Europe that is completely composed of states with roughly 5 to 10 million citizens. According to Heineken, the absence of a powerful state would lead to a chance of more stability, equality and peace. While under the motto of small is beautiful, administration in the states could be more efficient.
