= Saskia Noort =

Dutch author and journalist

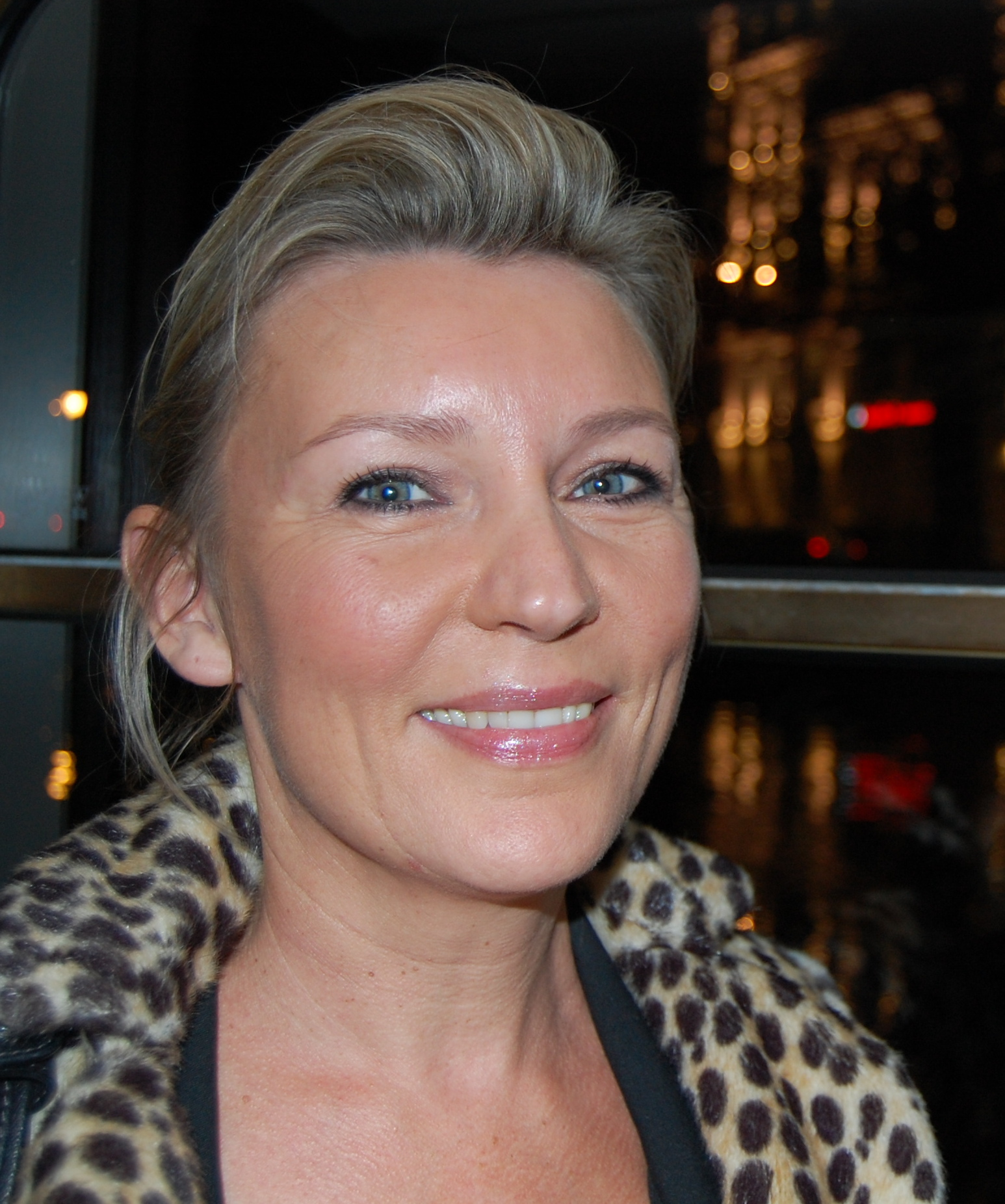
Saskia Noort in 2011

Saskia Noort (born 13 April 1967 in Bergen, North Holland) is a Dutch crime-writer and freelance journalist.

She has written articles for the Dutch editions of Marie Claire and Playboy as well as published three novels, The Dinner Club published in English in 2007 by Bitter Lemon Press, translated by Paul Vincent and "Back to the Coast" published in English in 2009 by Bitter Lemon Press, translated by Laura Vroomen.

Her third book, New Neighbours was released in May 2006 in the Netherlands and was a bestseller. The rights have been sold to an English publisher.

== Selected works ==
- Back to the Coast, 2003
- The Dinner Club, 2004
- New Neighbours, 2006
- Fever, 2011
