= The Dark House (2009 Dutch film) =

2009 Dutch thriller film

- Theatrical release poster
- Directed by: Will Koopman
- Written by: Lex Wertwijn
- Based on: Back to the Coast by Saskia Noort
- Produced by: Gijs van de Westelaken
- Starring: Linda de Mol; Ariane Schluter
- Cinematography: Tom Erisman
- Edited by: Liesbeth Wieggers; Joseph Derksen
- Music by: Jeroen Rietbergen
- Production companies: Column Film; KeyFilm; AVRO
- Distributed by: RCV Film Distribution
- Release date: 29 October 2009
- Running time: 110 minutes
- Country: Netherlands
- Language: Dutch
- Box office: $3,928,464

The Dark House (Dutch: Terug naar de kust, lit. Back to the Coast) is a 2009 Dutch thriller film based on a novel by Saskia Noort.

== Cast ==
- Linda de Mol as Maria
- Ariane Schluter as Ans
- Pierre Bokma as Rechercheur Van Wijk
- Huub Stapel as Victor Terpstra
- Daan Schuurmans as Geert
- Koen De Bouw as Harry
