= Mark Steven Tillack =

Mark Steven Tillack is a Research Scientist Emeritus from the University of California, San Diego. He was named Fellow of the Institute of Electrical and Electronics Engineers (IEEE) in 2012 for contributions to fusion energy technology and Fellow of the American Nuclear Society (ANS) in 2013.
