= Mark van Eeuwen =

Dutch actor (born 1976)

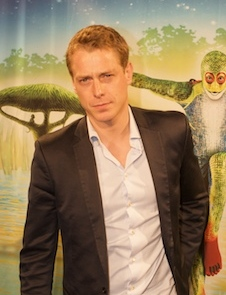
- Born: 23 July 1976 (age 49); Warnsveld, Netherlands
- Occupation: Actor
- Known for: Goede tijden, slechte tijden

Mark van Eeuwen (born 23 July 1976) is a Dutch actor. He is known for his role as Jack van Houten in the long-running soap opera Goede tijden, slechte tijden.

== Career ==
He played the role of criminal Frans Meijer in the 2015 film Kidnapping Freddy Heineken. He also played in the 2018 film Redbad.

In 2013, he participated in an episode of the game show De Jongens tegen de Meisjes.

In 2016, he played the role of Peter in The Passion, a Dutch Passion Play held every Maundy Thursday since 2011.

== Personal life ==
Van Eeuwen has been in relationships with actress Lieke van Lexmond and model Kim Kötter.

== Filmography ==
=== As actor ===
- Snowfever (2004)
- Mike Bassett: Manager (2005)
- Voetbalvrouwen (2007)
- The Dinner Club (2010)
- Kidnapping Freddy Heineken (2015)
- Rendez-vous (2015)
- Alles voor elkaar (2017)
- Redbad (2018)
- Blijf van mijn kind (2018)
- Flikken Rotterdam (2016-current)
- The Forgotten Battle (2020)
- Stromboli (2022)

=== As contestant ===
- De Jongens tegen de Meisjes (2013)

=== As producer ===
- Love in a Bottle (2021)
- Stromboli (2022)
