= Westpoort =

Coordinates: 52°24′21″N 4°49′16″E

Westpoort (Amsterdam)
- Area of Amsterdam
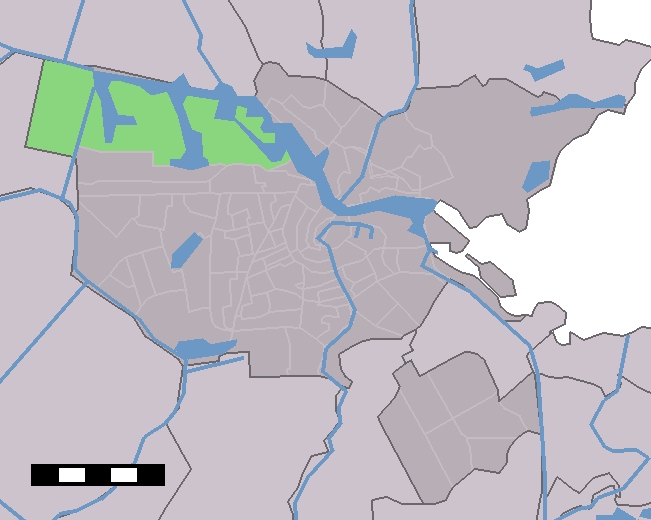
- The location of Westpoort in Amsterdam
- Country: Netherlands
- Province: North Holland
- COROP: Amsterdam

Area
  - Total: 35.47 km^{2} (13.70 sq mi)
  - Land: 26 km^{2} (10 sq mi)

Population
  - Total: 370
  - Density: 14/km^{2} (37/sq mi)
- Time zone: UTC+1 (CET)

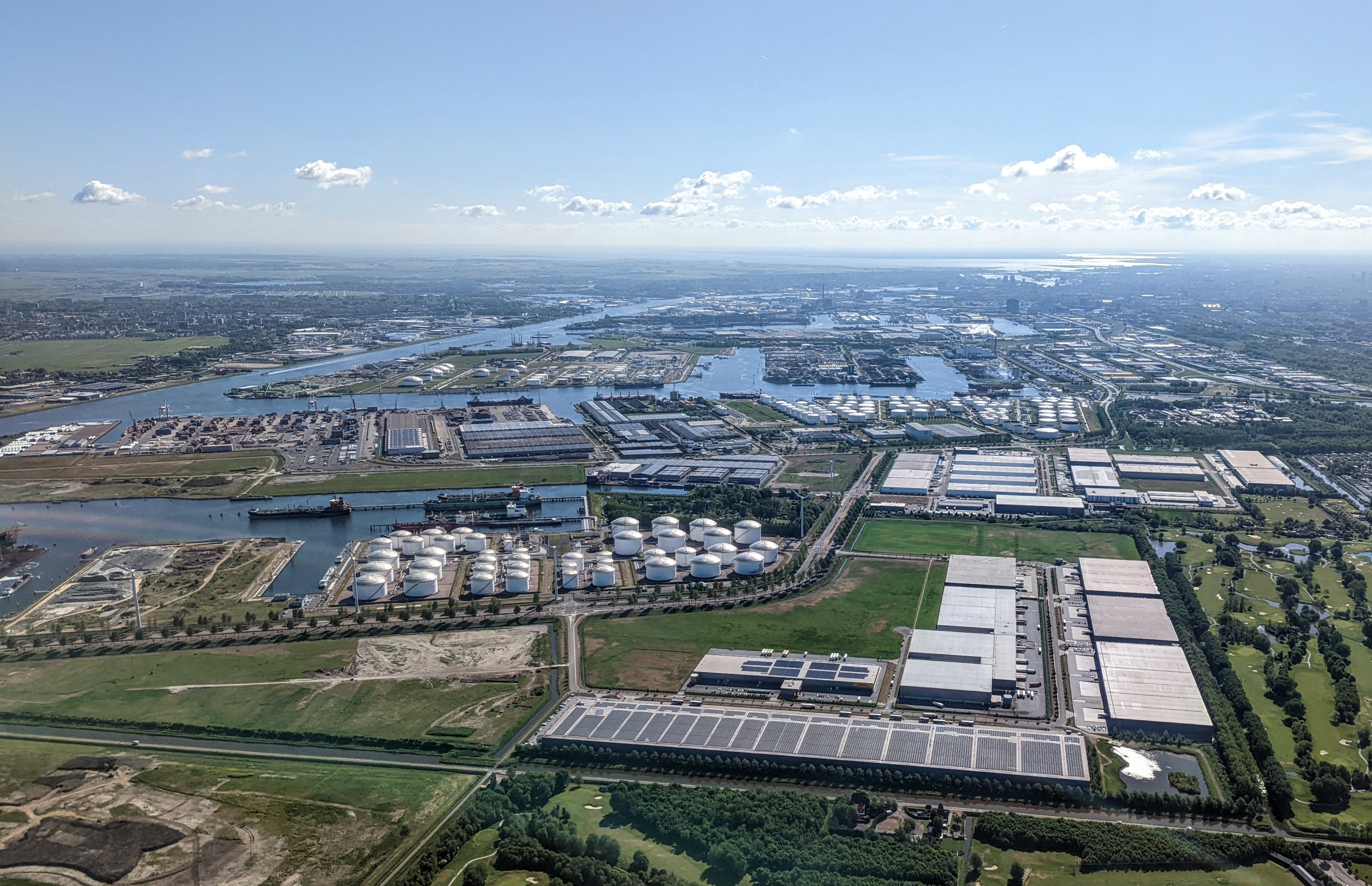
Westpoort and Port of Amsterdam, aerial view from the west

Westpoort (Western Gateway or Western Port) is an international port area and one of the largest industrial parks in the Netherlands. The area covers the Port of Amsterdam and the industrial area in the northwest of Amsterdam.

== Business ==
While the area has very few permanent residents, it serves as corporate headquarters of over 2000 Dutch and foreign companies that operate in the Netherlands. In 2008 approximately 45,000 people commuted to the area for work, making it the largest commuter destination within city limits. Approximately 70,000 people work in this harbor region of Amsterdam.

== Geography ==
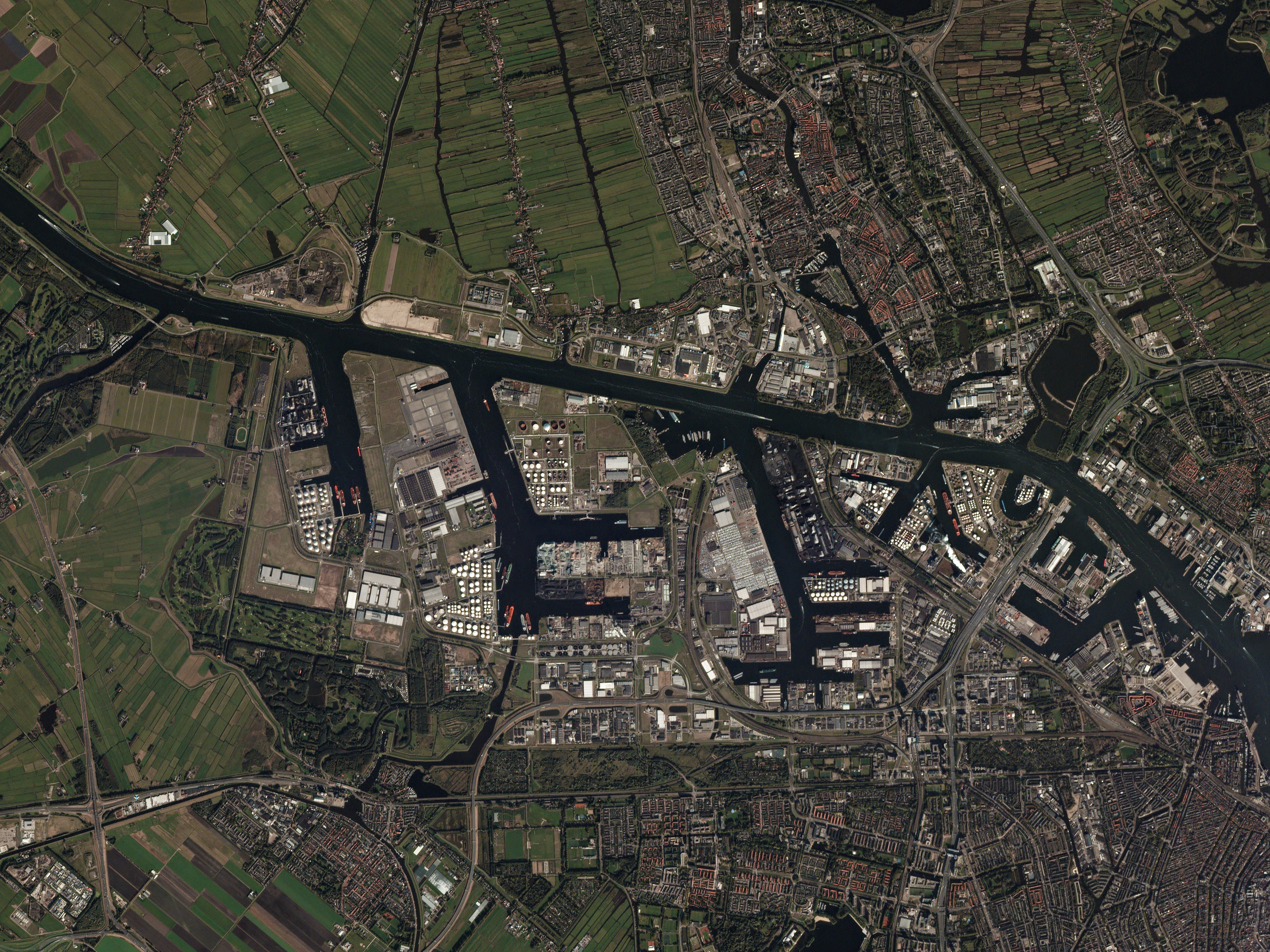
Satellite photo of Westpoort, 2016

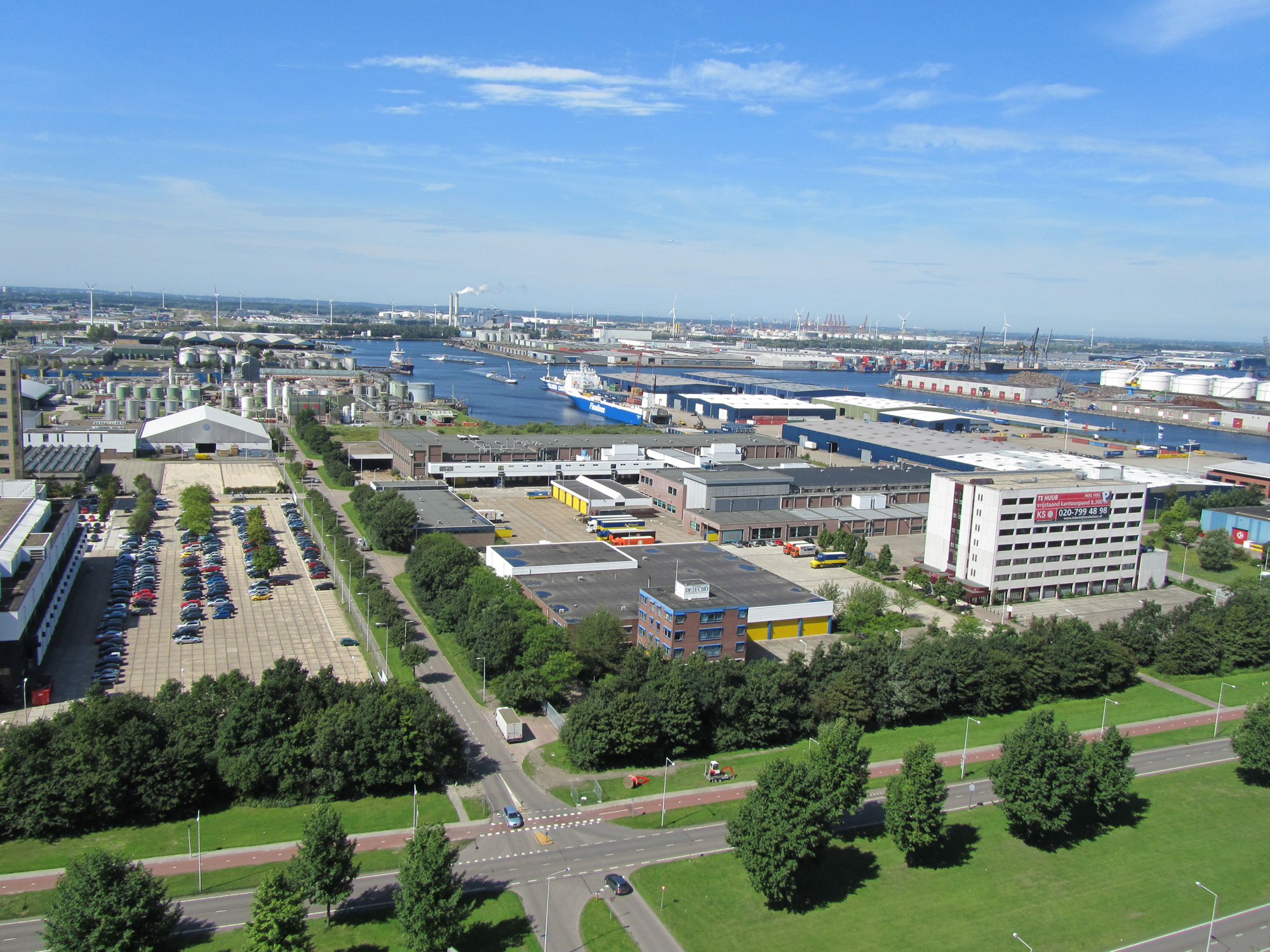
The Westhaven harbour

It is located in the north-western part of Amsterdam. It is divided in the industrial areas of Teleport, Sloterdijk areas I, II and III, De Heining and the harbour area (Havengebied). Westpoort covers an area of over 35 square kilometres (14 mi^{2}).

The northern border of the area is formed by the North Sea Canal which connects it with the North Sea via the IJ. The district borders the borough of West and Nieuw-West, and on the westside the municipality of Haarlemmerliede en Spaarnwoude (including the town of Halfweg).

== Administration ==
As primarily a business district, Westpoort does not have its own district committee. Thus Westpoort is a city area, not a borough (stadsdeel), because it has a low population and it is directly governed by the central municipal council of Amsterdam, as a port and industrial park rather than a neighborhood.
