= Hans-Martin Tillack =

Hans-Martin Tillack (born 1961 in Königs Wusterhausen, near Berlin), is a German reporter, who grew up in Stuttgart.

He studied politology and sociology in Marburg and Berlin, worked for five years as reporter for taz before coming to Stern in 1993 – first in Bonn, from 1999 to 2004 in Brussels, today in Berlin.

In 2005, he received the Leipziger Medienpreis for his EU reporting.

He was the most efficient in exposing Eurostat scandal, the EU statistical body based in Luxembourg. Working for German news magazine Stern, for months he wrote his successive findings and Stern magazine published his revelations about hidden accounts and fictitious contracts. Until May 16, 2003 when Financial Times headlines revealed "A vast enterprise for looting community funds". Two top French managers were removed from office and the whole Eurostat directorate was dismissed. Six separate fraud investigations into Eurostat were required by OLAF, the EU anti-fraud body.

Subsequently Hans-Martin Tillack was arrested by Belgian police at the instigation of authorities of the European Union, whose bodies he was investigating in relation to allegations of fraud. OLAF suggested that the reporter had bribed EU officials in order to gather documents for an article he published in 2002 on alleged irregularities in OLAF.

An action by Belgian police followed that resulted in the journalist being detained by the police for several hours, his home and office being searched, and possessions including 16 boxes of documents, two archive boxes, two computers and four mobile phones being seized.

In 2007, the European Court of Human Rights judged that Hans-Martin Tillack's right not to reveal his sources of information had been violated and asked Belgium to pay him €10,000 for moral damages as well as €30,000 in costs.

The hundreds of pages of seized documents were eventually returned to him in 2008.

In January 2009, the Belgian judiciary on Tuesday definitively closed the case brought by the EU anti-fraud office, OLAF, in 2004 against Hans-Martin Tillack. Aidan White, general secretary of the European Federation of Journalists (EFJ) which supported Mr Tillack throughout the case, argued the need for EU officials to apologise to the journalist.

== Books ==
- Die korrupte Republik: Über die einträgliche Kungelei von Politik, Bürokratie und Wirtschaft (The corrupt Republic: Lucrative fiddling of politics, bureaucracy and economy), by Hans-Martin Tillack, Hoffmann und Campe, 2009
- Raumschiff Brüssel. Wie die Demokratie in Europa scheitert (Spaceship Brussels. How democracy in Europe fails), by Andreas Oldag and Hans-Martin Tillack, Fischer (paperback), 2004
- Raumschiff Brüssel. Wie die Demokratie in Europa scheitert, by Andreas Oldag and Hans-Martin Tillack, Argon Verlag, 2003

== See also ==
- List of books on European Union
