= European Anti-Fraud Office =

European Union agency

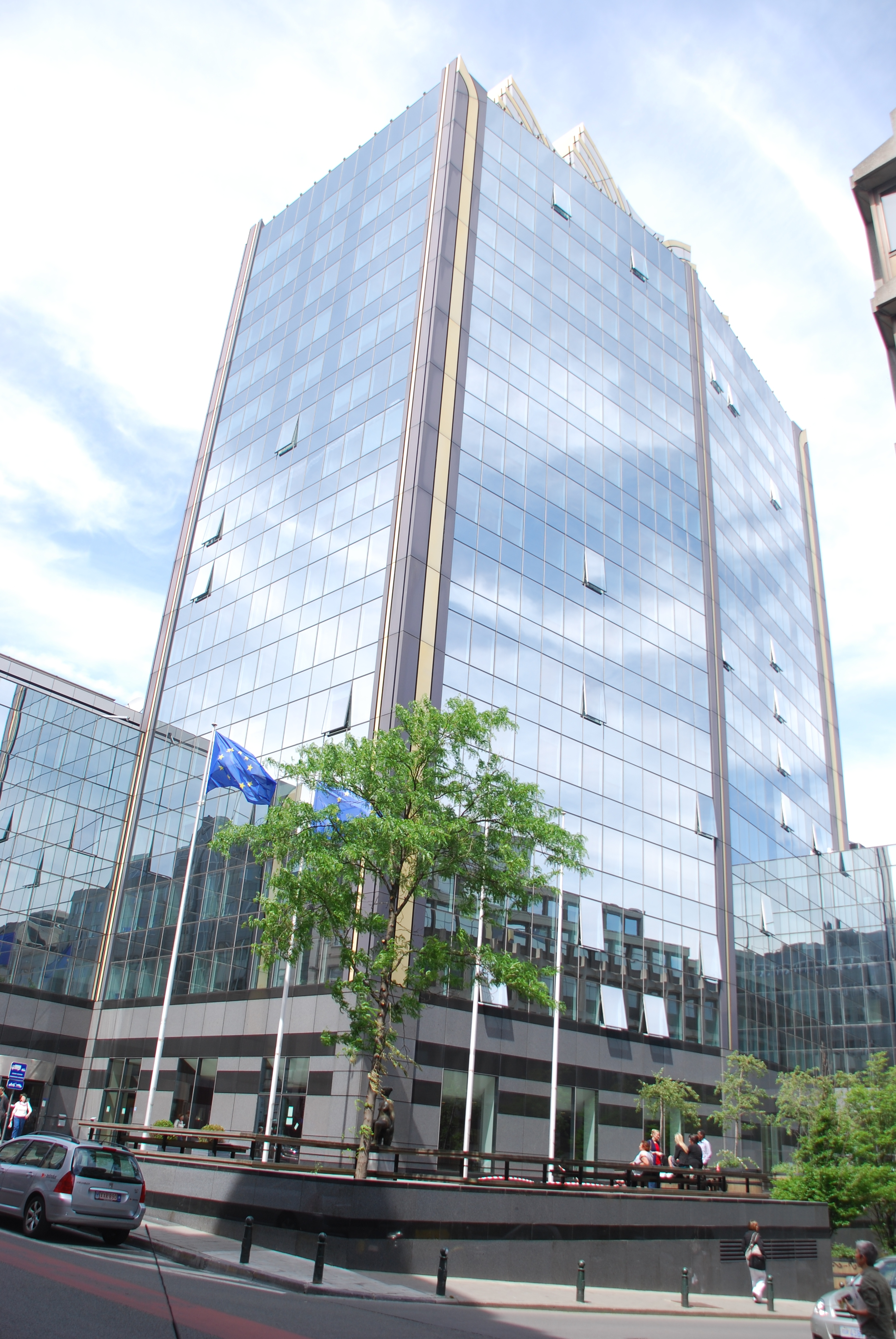
- European Anti-fraud Office headquarters
- Formation: 28 April 1999; 27 years ago
- Type: European Commission
- Headquarters: City of Brussels
- Website: anti-fraud.ec.europa.eu/index_en

The European Anti-Fraud Office (commonly known as OLAF, from the French: Office européen de lutte antifraude) is a body mandated by the European Union (EU) to protect the Union's financial interests. It was founded on 28 April 1999, under the European Commission Decision 1999/352. Its tasks are threefold:

- to fight fraud affecting the EU budget;
- investigate corruption by staff of EU institutions; and
- develop anti-fraud legislation and policies.

OLAF independently conducts internal and external administrative investigations. It coordinates the activities of its anti-fraud partners in the Member States. OLAF supplies EU member states with the necessary support and technical knowledge to help them in their anti-fraud activities. It contributes to the design of the anti-fraud strategy of the European Union, and takes the necessary initiatives to strengthen the relevant legislation.

OLAF has no judicial powers to oblige national law enforcement authorities to act on its follow-up recommendations.

== Legal basis ==
Regulation No 883/2013, governing the work of OLAF, entered into force on 1 October 2013. This Regulation builds on the experience gained by OLAF since its creation. It provides a clear statutory basis that codifies past practice and reinforces the effectiveness of OLAF's investigative activities. The Regulation also sets the basis for a better exchange of information between OLAF and its partners.

== Structure ==
OLAF has a hybrid status. On the one hand, it is a Directorate General of the European Commission, under the responsibility of the Vice-President in charge of Budget and Human Resources. On the other hand, it is independent for its investigative activities.

OLAF has a staff of about 420: police, customs and legal experts from the member states of the European Union (EU).

Salla Saastamoinen is the Acting Director-General of the European Anti-Fraud Office, having assumed the position on 1 October 2025. She succeeded Ville Itälä, who served as Director-General from 2018 to 2025.

== History ==
OLAF was created in 1999. Following the events that led to the resignation of the Santer Commission, its predecessor UCLAF (Unité de coordination de lutte anti-fraude) was replaced with a new anti-fraud body (OLAF) with stronger powers. These also included conducting investigations within EU institutions.

== Activities ==
Between 2010 and 2018, OLAF:

- Concluded over 1900 investigations
- Recommended the recovery of over €6.9 billion on the EU budget
- Issued over 2500 recommendations for judicial, financial, disciplinary and administrative action to be taken by the competent authorities of the Member States and the EU

As a result of OLAF's investigative work, sums unduly spent were gradually returned to the EU budget, criminals faced prosecution before national courts and better anti-fraud safeguards were put in place throughout Europe.

OLAF's concluded investigations include cases relating to EU staff, direct expenditure, external aid, customs and cigarette smuggling.

=== Embezzlement of research funding ===
A 2017 investigation uncovered a fraud scheme in which grantees misappropriated more than EUR 1.4 million worth of European Union funds meant for emergency response hovercraft prototypes. The investigation focused on alleged irregularities in a Research and Innovation project granted to a European consortium. The Italian-led consortium, with partners in France, Romania and the United Kingdom, was tasked with creating two hovercraft prototypes to be used as emergency nautical vehicles able to reach remote areas in case of environmental accidents. During on-the-spot checks performed in Italy by OLAF and the Italian Guardia di Finanza, OLAF discovered various disassembled components of one hovercraft, as well as another hovercraft which was completed after the deadline of the project. In order to obtain the EU funds, the Italian partners had falsely attested to the existence of the required structural and economic conditions to carry out the project.

Investigative activities carried out by OLAF in the UK revealed that the British partner only existed on paper and that the company was in fact created and owned by the same Italian partners. To simulate the actual development of the project and to divert funds, fictitious costs had also been recorded. In practice, once the EU funds were obtained, the Italian grantees used accounting artifices to siphon off money, forging documents attesting false expenses.

An analysis of more than 12 000 financial transactions and payments made in the project showed that part of the EU funds received by the Italian and UK partners had been used to pay off a mortgage on a castle facing foreclosure. OLAF concluded its investigation in 2017 with two judicial recommendations—to the Public Prosecutor's Office of Genoa and to the City of London Police in the UK—and a financial recommendation to the Directorate-General for Research and Innovation of the European Commission to recover the defrauded funds. The Italian authorities followed up on OLAF's recommendations and investigating the persons concerned for embezzlement and fraud against the EU, false accounting, fraudulent bankruptcy and fraudulent statements.

=== Ending solar panel anti-dumping duty evasion ===
In 2017 OLAF also investigated another major case involving the evasion of anti-dumping and countervailing duties imposed on solar panels originating in, or consigned from, the People's Republic of China. It was alleged that solar panels were incorrectly declared on importation into the European Union as being of Taiwanese origin. In the framework of this investigation, OLAF, in cooperation with representatives of the Dutch and French customs agencies and Taiwanese authorities, carried out joint enquiries in Taiwan. Further checks took place in Antwerp, in cooperation with Belgian customs.

OLAF collected and analysed transhipment data, EU import data, as well as other documents, while also conducting five company visits of Taiwanese exporters/consignors and visits to eleven shipping agents in Belgium and Taiwan. It was revealed that approximately 2500 container loads of Chinese solar panels had been transhipped via Taiwan to the EU. OLAF discovered that these consignments of solar panels imported into the European Union were not actually of Taiwanese origin, as declared. The solar panels were shipped from solar panel producers in the People's Republic of China to the Free Zone in Taiwan, where the solar panels were loaded into other containers and shipped to the EU with new documents claiming Taiwanese origin. It was established that, in reality, the goods came from the People's Republic of China and therefore anti-dumping and countervailing duties were applicable. As a result, OLAF issued a financial recommendation amounting to EUR 135 million.

=== UK not acting on China import fraud ===
In March 2022 the European Court of Justice (ECJ)—the highest court, from which there is no further appeal—made a final ruling that the UK government, when a member of the EU, had been negligent from 2011 to 2017 in allowing criminal gangs to import cheap Chinese-made clothes and shoes with false invoices understating their value, which were then re-exported into other EU countries. The court considered that EU-wide anti-fraud measures set out by OLAF should have been used. Although Britain had left the EU, the country remains subject to ECJ jurisdiction for breaches of EU law while a member state. The EU claimed compensation of over €2 billion.

=== Cigarette smuggling ===
In addition to investigating matters relating to fraud, corruption and other offences affecting all EU expenditure, OLAF also conducts investigations relating to some areas of EU revenue, mainly customs duties. Tobacco smuggling causes huge losses to national and the EU budget; hence OLAF investigates and coordinates criminal cases relating to large-scale, international cigarette smuggling.

In addition to its investigative work, OLAF also supports the EU Institutions and Member States in shaping tobacco anti-smuggling policy. Following litigation before US courts, and to address the problem of contraband and counterfeit cigarettes, the EU Member States and the European Commission signed (between 2004 and 2010) legally binding and enforceable agreements with the world's four largest tobacco manufacturers. The companies agreed to pay a collective total of $2.15 billion to the EU and Member States. With the agreements, the manufacturers have also committed themselves to comprehensive rules concerning sales and distribution practices to promote compliance with EU and national rules as well as to ensure that their genuine cigarettes are sold, distributed, stored and shipped in accordance with all legal requirements.

OLAF brings significant added value to operations like these, where contraband networks operate across borders and can only be countered by coordinated EU-wide efforts.

=== Wood laundering ===
OLAF handles illegal logging and smuggling of precious wood and timber into the EU (wood laundering).

== Challenges ==
OLAF is reliant on the cooperation of European Member States. OLAF is not a sanctioning body and does not have any powers to prosecute or discipline, only to make recommendations. It is up to the relevant judicial bodies and EU institutions to follow the recommendations and take action or not. Responses to OLAF's recommendations vary between states, EU institutions and smaller judiciary bodies. For example, most Hungarian authorities have all refused to sign cooperation agreements with OLAF and rarely follow recommendations despite there being high levels of corruption within the country. It has been suggested that Hungary refuses to cooperate because the corruption is in the interests of the authorities, and OLAF lacks the influence needed to force cooperation. EUROPOL and EUROJUST are two organisations OLAF struggles to work with, because OLAF feels like they encroach on its jurisdiction and have no place in fraud investigations. There is no one legal code to protect the European Budget—each Member State has their own legal systems, with their own law enforcement and evidence collecting methods and this can reduce the efficiency of OLAF. Its efficiency is also hindered by reliance on state/agency cooperation, cultural, legal and language barriers and complications arising from cross-border investigations.

== Criticism ==
=== Legal basis ===
The legal basis of OLAF has been a subject for criticism. While OLAF is not a law enforcement agency its recommendations hold substantial sway in the EU structures. This raises concerns regarding the transparency of OLAF's actions and basic rights of the subjects under investigation. Helen Xanthaki, Professor of Law at UCL, has stated: "OLAF is entangled in an ad hoc, fragmented, conflicting and uncodified mess of largely self-imposed operational conventions that are supposed to be applied within the tight constrictions of legitimacy and constitutionality in criminal investigations. Even the jurisdictional identity of legitimacy and constitutionality is fluid. Which law and which Constitution would the unavoidably confused OLAF staff work under: Belgian, EU, that of the jurisdiction with competence over the investigation, or that with competence over the actual, indeed usually cross-border, action under investigation? And really, what is the nature of OLAF and the task of its staff: are they investigators, prosecutors or something in between?"

=== Selectivity and partiality ===
OLAF has been criticized by Ingeborg Gräßle, a former member of the budgetary control committee of the European Parliament, who has indicated that less than a third of OLAF's staff is dealing with the EU's agricultural and structural funds, even though they represent more than 80 percent of the EU budget. Furthermore, Gräßle pointed out that OLAF's resources are disproportionately allocated to counterfeiting investigations: "They [OLAF] have the luxury industry with a clear interest to help them finding counterfeit goods, but in my view OLAF is not a European FBI. OLAF's mandate is clearly to protect the financial interests of the EU. This means to protect the EU budget".

=== Dalligate ===
OLAF conducted the investigation that lead to the forced resignation of John Dalli, former European Commissioner for Health and Consumer Policy. Basing on OLAF's report, Dalli was accused by José Manuel Barroso, the former President of the European Commission, of using an associate to ask for a bribe from a Swedish tobacco company.

However, none of the accusations against Dalli were found to be substantiated and when OLAF's report leaked, the document was criticized as biased and amateurish. The initial complaint against Dalli was made by Swedish Match, a tobacco company. According to Dalli, the objective of the affair was to impede the EU Tobacco Products Directive, which imposed stricter regulations on tobacco marketing. Leaked documents from Philip Morris International later revealed that the tobacco company had employed 161 people and spent vast sums in an effort to delay the Tobacco Products Directive. At the time of the Dalli affair Philip Morris International had ties with both Swedish Match and OLAF, the former being a strategic partner in a venture to commercialize snus globally and the latter being part of an anti-contraband agreement between the European Commission and PMI which saw PMI provide information as well as funds to OLAF. Corporate Europe Observatory, a lobbying transparency NGO has questioned whether the Dalli affair had been a politically motivated tobacco industry trap.

=== Criminal investigation of Giovanni Kessler ===
Belgian authorities opened an investigation against the former Director-General of OLAF Giovanni Kessler who was suspected of illegally listening in to a telephone conversation whilst probing into the Dalli case. In 2016 Kessler was stripped of EU immunity. The investigation remains ongoing.

== See also ==
- European Court of Auditors
- European Public Prosecutor
- Institutions of the European Union
- Internal Audit Service (IAS)
