= Frouke Fokkema =

Dutch playwright and filmmaker (born 1952)

- Born: Frouke Fokkema; 12 February 1952 (age 74); Hilversum, Netherlands
- Occupations: playwright; director; screenwriter
- Years active: 1982–present

Frouke Fokkema (born 12 February 1952) is a Dutch playwright, screenwriter and film director. She is best known for directing and writing Vigour which earned her a Golden Calf for best direction.

== Early life and education ==
Frouke Fokkema was born in Hilversum on 12 February 1952 to an actress and a Frisian sailor. She has been writing since she was eleven years old. She went to middle school in Drachten, Friesland. Upon finishing school, she desired to leave Friesland, as such she went to a kibbutz in Israel on her own, where she fell in love with farming.

She attended a theatre school for six months before switching to an agriculture school based in Kerk-Avezaath for biodynamic agriculture where she stayed for three years. Afterwards, she worked for a year at the garden therapy Emiliehoeve that was built for drug addicts. She was also an employee at a drug rehabilitation center Arta, based on Rudolf Steiner's anthroposophy teachings.

She also worked at pig farm in Norway, a Limburgian fruit orchard and as a goat herder in the Pyrenees. Between jobs she spend time on the estate of Leo Tolstoy, attended a Tibetan monastery and formed a personal friendship with Austrian author Thomas Bernhard. With the work of Bernhard and staying in Bochum for an internship at the Bochumer ensemble caused her to rediscover her love for playwriting.

== Career ==
Upon her return to the Netherlands, Fokkema began talking to numerous directors as she had decided that she had nothing to lose. Via filmmaker Mady Saks, she came in contact with director Karst Woudstra, who asked her to continue writing. Most of these compositions early in her career would be autobiographical in nature and involve different aspects of her life.

In 1982, Fokkema made her debut as a playwright with De Omweg. For the story, she turned her meeting with Thomas Bernhard, into a semi-biographical play about a woman who works on a farm in the French Pyrenees that gets fascinated and falls in love with a famous writer and decides to visit him. Marlies Heuer and Dic van Duin played the woman and writer respectively, and it was directed by Dea Koert. It was met positively by critics.

For the 1984/1985 theater season, Fokkema wrote the play Darrenslacht for theater company Theater Persona. It was directed by Paul Vermeulen Windsant and Ansje Beentjes, Cor van Rijn and Erik de Vries starring. She wanted to explore the rural vs city dichotomy, as she has attended an agriculture school, has lived on farm and has kept bees. The tale chronicles a relationship between a woman from the city and a beekeeper. It was met a mostly negative critical response. Writing for het Vrije Volk, Tineke Straatman criticized the "one-dimensionality" of the Buckfast character calling him "unconvincing" and a "boring cliché", and opined that Fokkema is unable to hide her irritations for certain back to nature folk.

in 1985, she wrote the absurdist black comedy, De entourage van Emma, for television that was broadcast by VPRO on January 13, 1985. Its story revolves around an eccentric actress and her two servants who are visited by a journalist. The Parool article characterized it as a bizar and confusing story, that is convincingly acted and called it as a worthwhile watch. Fokkema first wrote it as a play years previously and it wasn't until program director Roelof Kiers picked up the project.

Four of Fokkema's ten one-act plays would be performed by Toneelgroep Amsterdam under the name of De Nacht van Fokkema in 1987 around the Christmas days. The plays in question were Vreemdgangers, Zwijgt, Drainage and Patronen.

In 1988, Fokkema was tapped to write the adaptation of Geerten Meijsing's Veranderlijk en wisselvallig for First Floor Pictures.

After establishing herself as an experienced and well-regarded playwright, she turned to film directing on the encouragement of film director Theo van Gogh. She wrote the script for Vigour three and half years before the release. The first idea of the movie came about when Fokkema lived in the atelier of painter Annemarie Fletcher, who created macabre paintings of the French countryside. She used the harshness and cruel parts of nature, agriculture and its people in contrast of the usually idealized image a tourist might have. Fokkema viewed the film as her closing her life with the countryside. Producer Matthijs van Heijningen boarded the project and De Trust theatre company was brought in to provide the acting talent with Theu Boermans taking on the lead role. She regarded the experience as satisfactory and was determined to continue her filmmaking career. At its premiere at the 1990s Netherlands Film Days as the opening film, it received a standing ovation from the audience. Fokkema was given the Golden Calf award for Best Direction. A year later, it was awarded the main price at the International Women's Film Festival by their jury. It was the single Dutch film at the festival.

Three years after her debut film, Fokkema began working on her second feature film called It Will Never Be Spring with Hilde Van Mieghem, Thom Hoffman and Hans Croiset in the lead roles. Described as absurdist, It follows a woman named Lin Lammertse in her thirties, during a boat trip with two friends, she begins reminiscing about an unhappy affair that involved sadomasochism. Like the previous film, she was reluctant to direct the film herself and had to talk in to it by van Heijningen. The film was screened at the 33rd International Critics' Week of the 1994 Cannes Film Festival. Response to her second feature was more mixed.

Around the same time, she kept writing plays for Toneelgroep Amsterdam and De Trust including one called Oh... Suzy Q, which she finished just before the premiere of It Will Never Be Spring. Besides a reading of the script at a Festival, Suzy Q was never performed.

After twelve years, a new text of hers would be performed on stage unlike her previous couple of plays that were turned into movies instead. In Brak, the plot revolves around a Dutch aristocratic family in particular an old painter who during World War II was deeply involved in high Nazi circles. According to Fokkema it was meant to explore on how to approach things made by terrible people. The play was mostly panned.

Fokkema approached producer Emjay Rechsteiner with her previously written Suzy Q play, she had grown the desire to turn the play into a feature film. The story revolves around a dysfunctional family in the 60s that meets Mick Jagger. The play was turned into a screenplay and Martin Koolhoven was hired as director. It starred in Carice van Houten in the lead role. The television film adaptation of Suzy Q was awarded with several awards, including three at Festival International de Programmes Audiovisuels with one for best screenplay.

In 2000, Fokkema adapted De Omweg into a feature film. The semi-biographical road movie drama took ten years to make. Tamar van den Dop played the main character in the film. The movie made its debut at Netherlands Film Festival 2000, where Tamar van den Dop was nominated for best actress. It would later go nationwide on November 9, 2000, to little notoriety.

Fokkema was one of the writers on Marilyn Monroe: Diamonds Are A Girl's Best Friend that was performed by Matzer Theaterproducties in 2010.

Vigour received a 4K restoration and a re-release as part of EYE Film Institute Netherlands's "Icons of Dutch cinema" in 2024. Filmkrant described the film as having "earned" the icon label and named it a somewhat forgotten Dutch classic. They also regarded Fokkema's career as unfulfilled.

== Plays ==
- De Omweg (1982)
- De darrenslacht (1985)
- Vreemdgangers (1987)
- Zwijgt (1987)
- Patronen (1987)
- Drainage (1987)
- Brak (1999)

== Filmmaking credits ==
Year	Title	Director	Writer	Notes	Ref
1990	Vigour	Yes	Yes		
1993	It Will Never Be Spring	Yes	Yes		
1999	Suzy Q	No	Yes	Television film	
2000	De Omweg	Yes	Yes		
