= The Province (film) =

1991 film

De Provincie
- Theatrical release poster
- Directed by: Jan Bosdriesz
- Written by: Hugo Heinen
- Based on: De Provincie by Jan Brokken
- Produced by: Frans Rasker
- Starring: Tamar van den Dop; Thom Hoffman; Pierre Bokma; Gijs Scholten van Aschat
- Cinematography: Jules van den Steenhoven
- Edited by: Hans Dunnewijk
- Music by: Otto Ketting
- Distributed by: Concorde Film
- Release date: 20 September 1991
- Running time: 105 minutes
- Country: Netherlands
- Language: Dutch

The Province or De Provincie is a 1991 Dutch drama film directed by Jan Bosdriesz.

== Cast ==
- Thom Hoffman (Frank)
- Pierre Bokma (Peter)
- Gijs Scholten van Aschat (Koos)
- Tamar van den Dop (Lili)
- Peter Oosthoek (Father of Frank)
- Gerard Thoolen (Sartorius)
- Gusta Gerritsen (Jenny)
- Camilla Braaksma (Nathalie)
- Els Ingeborg Smits (Mother of Frank)
- Rudolf Lucieer (Psychiatrist)
- Joss Flühr (Mrs. van Strijen)
- Rifka Lodeizen (Girl, working at bank)
- Eva Thornton (Young Emily)
