= Tamar van den Dop =

Dutch actress and filmmaker (born 1970)

- Born: Tamara van den Dop; 8 February 1970 (age 56); Amsterdam, Netherlands
- Education: Maastricht Academy of Dramatic Arts
- Occupations: Actress; director; writer; producer
- Years active: 1984–present
- Spouse: Gregor Meerman
- Children: 2

Tamar van den Dop (born 8 February, 1970) is a Dutch actress, filmmaker and screenwriter. In 1997 she was awarded a Gouden Beeld for her role in the television drama Zwarte Sneeuw. As a theater actor she won the Colombina for her role as Hanna in the play, Schlemiel, with the theater group Het Groote Hoofd. She was nominated for her second Colombina for her part in Speeldrift. She is also known for her supporting role in the film Character, which won the Best Foreign Language Film at the Oscars in 1998.

== Early life and education ==
Tamar van den Dop was born on 8 February 1970 in Amsterdam, Netherlands. She grew up in Amsterdam-Zuid with her mother; her father was an artist that lived in Israel, who she has never met. She is Jewish. She attended secondary school at the Montessori Lyceum Amsterdam.

During her youth she made her debut (then still called Tamara) in 1984 with the Schatertheater on the podium of De Krakeling in the play called Liefde in Afrika as Madame la Directrice. and in 1986 in de film Op Hoop van Zegen, within she took on the role of Clementine, daughter of the reder Bos. She (16) played together with Danny de Munk (15). She was selected from two thousand aspiring actors. Filming took place in Goedereede and Yerseke. It had its premiere on August 6, 1986 at the Tuschinski Theatre. She also played in the film adaptation of Yvonne Keuls's Jan Rap en z'n maat as Janneke.

Between 1989 and 1993 she studied at the Maastricht Academy of Dramatic Arts. When she was twenty years old, on a break between her studies she played in her first big film role in movie called The Province, which earned her a Golden Calf nomination. As part of a graduation film she starred alongside her peers in the short film Crankybox, directed by Frans Weisz. On stage, she played in Gyges and His Ring for Toneelgroep Amsterdam in 1992. In 1993, she played in a new performance of James Joyce's Exiles as Beatrice.

== Career ==
In 1994, she starred in a restaging of George Bernard Shaw's Heartbreak House for the RO theater company. She also had a minor role in De Partizanen series.

In 1996, van den Dop took on the lead role as Eva Bender in the twelve-part television drama series Zwarte Sneeuw, written by Willem Capteyn and Carel Donck and directed by Maarten Treurniet. She was chosen from fifty actresses who auditioned for the role. Production took over a year and van den Dop had the most filming days with 160. She struggled with the lack of chronological shooting. The show was met a positive critical response but viewership wise it was considered a disappointment. NCRV rerun the series two years later. She was awarded a Gouden Beeld for her work in Zwarte Sneeuw.

In 1997, she starred as Lorna Te George in the historical drama Character, directed Mike van Diem. Based on the novel of the same, her character was the love interest in the story. Her first test audition with Mike van Dien was described as "disastrous", the second test went better, but she got the role after she met van Dien's partner at a chance meeting at the Tuschinski Theatre and exhibiting the precise behaviour van Diem wanted from the character from the film. The movie was met a positive reception, and was awarded the Best Foreign Language Film at the Oscars in 1998. Despite its international success, van den Dop wasn't approached by anyone in Hollywood and at the time she didn't have her own agent unlike her American contemporaries. The film would be cut into three-part mini-series for television and broadcast on Nederland 3 in 1999. That same year, she also appeared in the short film, Kringen van tijd. On stage, she returned for a restaging of Arthur Schnitzler's Flirt, in it she took on the role of Mizi.

Van den Dop would star in Friedrich Hebbel's Judith as the titular Judith. It was performed by Nes-theaters in March and April across the Netherlands in 1998. On the small screen, she appeared in two television films, Thuisfront directed by Ivo van Hove and Het Glinsterend pantser, the latter is an adaptation of the Simon Vestdijk novel.

In 1999, she was one of the recipients of the Shooting Stars Award, which is awarded annually for emerging acting talent from Europe. Writing for Algemeen Dagblad, Albert Kok described her one of the greatest filmtalents of her generation. Her single major film release of the year was the family adventure film Missing Link. The movie was filmed two years prior but faced a prolonged delay so as not to compete with The Flying Liftboy, which was a massive box-office hit the previous year.

Opening the decade, van den Dop returned to the theatre where she starred in Schlemiel, based on Steven Berkoff's Kvetch, which she performed with theater group Het Groote Hoofd. For her performance she won the Colombina. The play would come back the following years. With her role in the film De Omweg, written and directed by Frouke Fokkema, she was nominated for a Golden Kalf in 2000. While filming, van den Dop shot behind the scenes footage and discussed her experiences on set, which was turned into a documentary called Scheppen gaat van au!. In his negative review of the film, Ab Zagt called van den Dop's acting "changeable" and noted the difficult working relationship between Fokkema and van den Dop that he thought was apparent in the documentary. She also played in a restaging of David Harrower's Knives in Hens. It ran until February 2001.

For her debut at the Orkater theatre company she played in De Gouden Eeuw, a music theatre production set during the Dutch Golden Age. The story revolves around a unnmarried woman, who is the mother of twins, portrayed by van den Dop. Her performance received major acclaim. She was involved in NTR's Kort!, where she appeared in the short film Babyphoned, directed by Diederik van Rooijen. Further she starred in the telefilm Polonaise, it follows a group of people that are getting to know each other while stuck in traffic. The film almost didn't happen as producer EO dropped out with KRO stepping in at the last moment the produce the project. In 2002, she moved into film directing with two short films Lot and Schat. Both prove to be a success and were sent as the Dutch entries for best short film for the Academy Awards in 2002 and 2004. Lot received the Special Jury and Audience awards at the Angers European First Film Festival in 2002.

Van den Dop made an appearance in the American television drama film, Brush with Fate, that was broadcast on CBS in 2003. On Dutch television, she played in the two-part political drama, Klem in de draaideur, that depicts the conflict between Minister of Justice Winnie Sorgdrager and chairman of the Board of Procurators General Arthur Docters van Leeuwen. She had also a role in her second Kort! short film named Stop!, and reunited with director Maarten Treurniet for a 15-minute period piece set in the early 20th century. Back on stage, she starred in her second production with music theatre group Orkater. In the tragicomedy IK, that was based on the works of French author Gustave Flaubert, she played the character of Madame Bovary from Flaubert's debut novel. They were on tour until the end of January.

In 2007, she made her directorial debut with Blind starring Halina Reijn and Joren Seldeslachts. The film was inspired by Hans Christian Andersen's The Snow Queen. It follows the blossoming romance between a young blind man (Seldeslachts) and an albino woman (Reijn) who is hired by the man's mother to read for him. Filming took place in Belgium and Bulgary. Her next feature film role was in Wolfsbergen, written and directed by Nanouk Leopold.

In 2008, van den Dop starred in a restaging of A Streetcar Named Desire as Blanche. This was the second collaboration between Toneelgroep Amsterdam and the Toneelschuur.

Van den Dop was nominated in 2013 for her performance in Speeldrift with a second Colombina nomination. Since 2016, she has been active at the Nationale Theater. In her later acting career, she has run into difficulties in getting roles that didn't require her playing mother every since her late twenties and following her own pregnancies she was offered even less parts as she didn't wanted endure intensive exercises to become thin again. This was one of her motivations for her to move into directing.

In 2023, she was to see on television in the drama De droom van de jeugd, she appreciated the role as she able play someone her age and situation. That same year, she created the documentary Mag ik je aanraken? (an episode of Het Uur van de Wolf), where she asked a diverse group of actors about acting out sex scenes and their feelings that come with it.

== Personal life ==
She has two children, Minke and Benjamin, with photographer and cinematographer Gregor Meerman.

== Select filmography ==
- Op hoop van Zegen (1986)
- Jan Rap en z'n maat (1989)
- The Province (1991) as Lili
- Crankybox (1994), short
- De Partizanen - Therese (1995)
- Zwarte Sneeuw - Eva Bender (1996)
- Character (1997) as Joba
- Kringen van de tijd (1997)
- Het Glinsterend pantser (1998)
- Thuisfront (1998) - Lucia
- Missing Link (1999)
- De Omweg (2000) - Joanna
- Babyphoned (2002), short
- Polonaise (2002) - Hilde
- Russen - Esther Vuijk (Episode, Satan huilt, 2002)
- Brush with Fate (2003) - Edith
- Klem in de draaideur (2003) - Winnie Sorgdrager
- Stop! (2003), short
- Birth of the Western, Holland 1903 (2004), short
- Keyzer & De Boer Advocaten - (Episode, Dwaze vaders, 2005)
- Baantjer - (Episode, De Cock en de man die weg wilde, 2005)
- Wolfsbergen (2007) - Sabine
- De co-assistent - (Episode, Beroepsgeheim, 2009)
- NPS Micromovies - Spannend verhaal!
- One Night Stand V - Proces
- Mixed Up (2011) - Bien
- Lukas aan Zee (2016), short
- Instinct (2019) - Milly
- Oogappels (television series, 2021) - Gwen
- Het Gouden Uur (television series, 2022) - Linda
- De droom van de jeugd (television series, 2023) - Carla
- Sinterklaasjournaal (2024) - Doctor
- Beyond Silence (2024) –Sandrine
- En we vliegen door de dagen (2025) - Rebecca
- Amsterdamned II (2025)

== Filmmaking credits ==
- Lot (2003)
- Schat (2004)
- Blind (2007)
- Supernova (2014)
- Mag ik je aanraken? (2023)

== Select theater performances ==
- 1992 - Gyges and His Ring (Toneelgroep Amsterdam)
- 1993 - Exiles (Kaaitheater)
- 1994 - Heartbreak House (Ro Theater)
- 1997 - Flirt (Het Zuidelijk Toneel)
- 1998 - Judith as Judith (NES-producties)
- 2000 - Knives in Hens (Noord Nederlands Toneel)
- 2000-2003 - Schlemiel (Kvetch) as Hannah (Het Grote Hoofd)
- 2002-2003/2004 - De Gouden Eeuw (Orkater)
- 2004-2005 - IK as Madame Bovary (Orkater)
- 2008-2009 - A Streetcar Named Desire as Blanche (TA-2 / Toneelschuur)
- 2008-2011 - De eenzame weg as Gabriele Wegrath (Compagnietheater in collaboration with Het Derde Bedrijf)
- 2009-2010 - Kees de jongen as Moeder van Kees (De Toneelmakerij)
- 2010 - Onder Controle (Toneelschuur)
- 2010-2011 - Emilia Galotti als Orsina (Nationale Toneel)
- 2011 - Olie als Eva (Compagnietheater in collaboration with Het Derde Bedrijf)
- 2012 - Schuldeisers (Compagnietheater in collaboration with Het Derde Bedrijf)
- 2013 - Speeldrift (coproductie Toneelschuur Producties and Nationale Toneel), nominatie Colombina
- 2013 - Het stenen bruidsbed (Nationale Toneel)
- 2014 - Bug (Jacop Ahlbom)
- 2015 - Sneeuwwitje (Ko van den Bosch)
- 2016 - Olie as Eva (Compagnietheater in collaboration with Nationale Toneel)
