= Vigour (film) =

Kracht
- Directed by: Frouke Fokkema
- Produced by: Matthijs van Heijningen
- Cinematography: Theo Bierkens
- Edited by: Wim Louwrier
- Music by: Lodewijk de Boer
- Release date: 21 September 1990
- Running time: 100 minutes
- Country: Netherlands
- Language: Dutch

Vigor or Kracht is a 1990 Dutch drama film directed by Frouke Fokkema.

== Cast ==
- Theu Boermans as Bert
- Anneke Blok as Roos
- Dave van Dinther as Thomas
- Khaldoun Elmecky as Jeu
- Bert Geurkink as Jo
- Jaap Spijkers as Slager
- Marisa Van Eyle as Slagersvrouw
- Ivo Jacobs as Slagerszoon
- Rogier Gerardu as Slagerszoon
- Mieke Verheyden as Moeder
- Marieke Heebink as Maria
- Eelco Vellema as Hubert
- Dea Koert as Marie-Louise
- Myranda Jongeling as Marktvrouw
- Rik Launspach as Sjors

== Release ==
=== Home media ===
Vigour received a 4K restoration and a re-release as part of EYE Film Institute Netherlands's "Icons of Dutch cinema" in 2024. Filmkrant described the film as having "earned" the icon label and named it a somewhat forgotten Dutch classic.
