= Jan Decleir =

Belgian actor

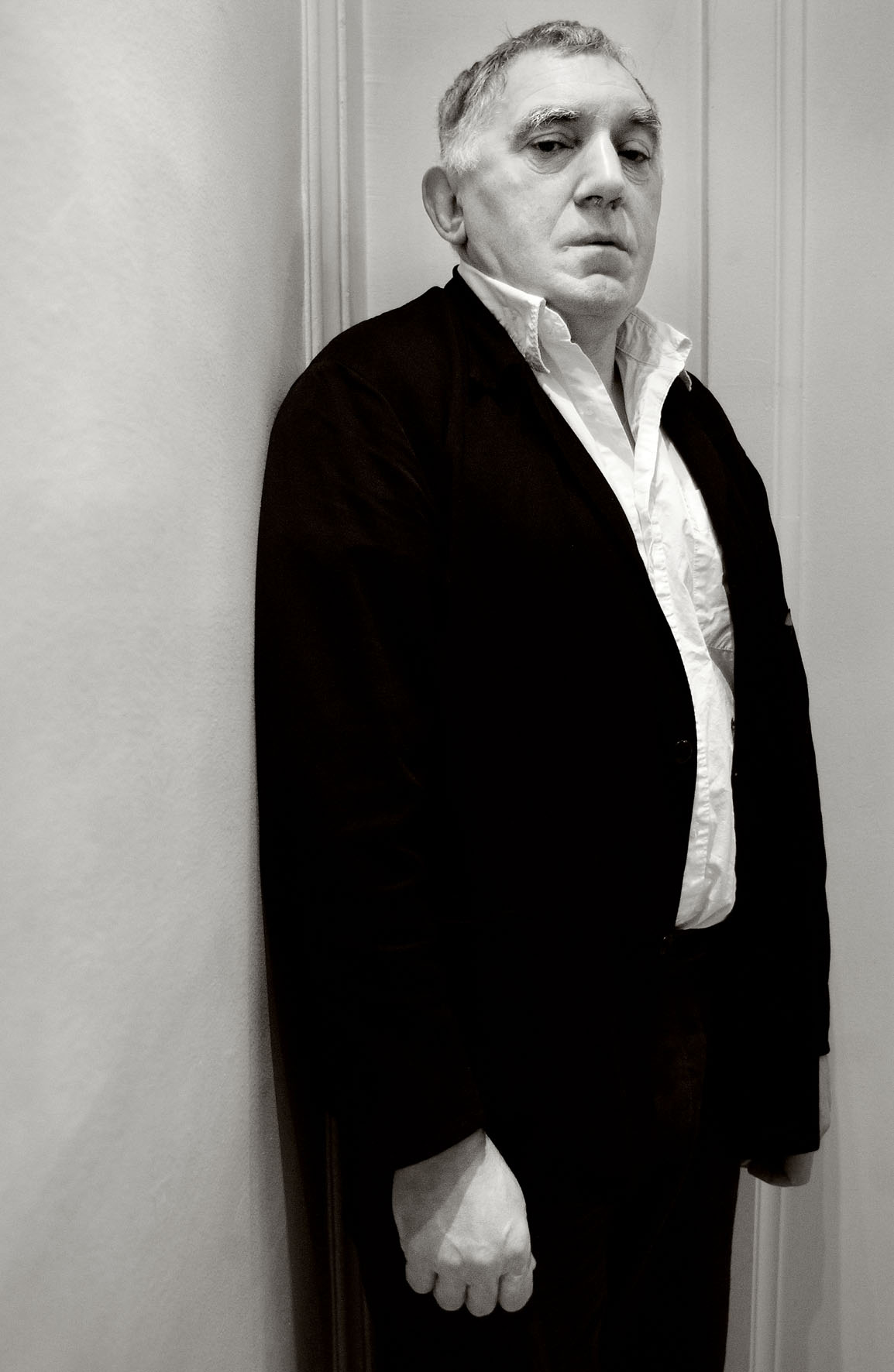
- Jan Decleir in 2003
- Born: Jan Amanda Gustaaf Decleir; 14 February 1946 (age 80); Niel, Belgium
- Notable work: "Priest Daens" in Daens; "Dreverhaven" in Character; "Angelo Ledda" in The Memory of a Killer
- Awards: Best Supporting Actor; 2007 Wolfsbergen; Culture Prize; 2003 Lifetime Achievement; Grolsch Film Award; 1997 Character

Jan Decleir (born as Jan Amanda Gustaaf Decleir on 14 February 1946) is a prolific Belgian movie and stage actor born in Niel, Antwerp.

== Career ==
He had his first big role in Fons Rademakers's Mira (1971). Since then, he has appeared in countless Flemish and Dutch films and TV productions. In the world of theater he gained his fame by acting at the International New Scene for the play Mistero Buffo by Dario Fo. To the larger audiences of television he became known through his role of Sil de strandjutter in 1976 in the equally named TV series. He starred in Academy Award winning movies including Karakter by Mike van Diem and Antonia and the Oscar-nominated social drama Daens. More recently he turned down roles in Stanley Kubrick's Eyes Wide Shut (due to commitments to other projects) and the James Bond film The World Is Not Enough. Decleir was also Belgium's national performer of Sinterklaas from 1993 until 2019.

In 2003 he had the starring role in the critically acclaimed thriller The Memory of a Killer (The Alzheimer Case) of which the leading American critic Roger Ebert wrote in his review: "Jan Decleir never goes for the easy effect, never pushes too hard, is a rock-solid occupant of his character. Everything he has to say is embodied, not expressed. Talks are underway for a Hollywood remake, but this performance will not be easily equaled. Gene Hackman, maybe. Morgan Freeman. Robert Mitchum, if he were alive. Decleir is the real thing."

For several years he also led the Studio Herman Teirlinck where he brought in many new teachers: actors from various theater companies (e.g., de Blauwe Maandag Compagnie, STAN, etc.).

== Personal life ==
Jan Decleir has been married to Brechtje Louwaard since 1 April 2006. He has three children: Sofie, Jenne and Flor. Two of his siblings – sister Reinhilde Decleir (died in 2022) and brother Dirk Decleir (died in 1974) involved in acting, too.

== Honors and awards ==
Over the lifespan of his career, Jan Decleir has received several prizes for his acting. He was awarded the Best Actor Award for his role in Off Screen (directed by Pieter Kuijpers) at the Montreal World Film Festival. In 2003 he received Golden Calf Culture Prize (Dutch: Gouden Kalf) and in 2007 a Golden Calf for Best Supporting Actor for the movie Wolfsbergen at the Netherlands Film Festival. In 2008 he was awarded the best actor prize at the Tiburon International Film Festival for his role in Man zkt vrouw (A Perfect Match). For his role in The Barons, he received the Magritte Award for Best Supporting Actor. In 2013 he also received the Flemish Culture Prize for General Cultural Merit. Decleir is also known as painter. He studied at the Royal Academy of Fine Arts in Antwerp and has regular expositions in De Zwarte Panter gallery.

=== Overview ===
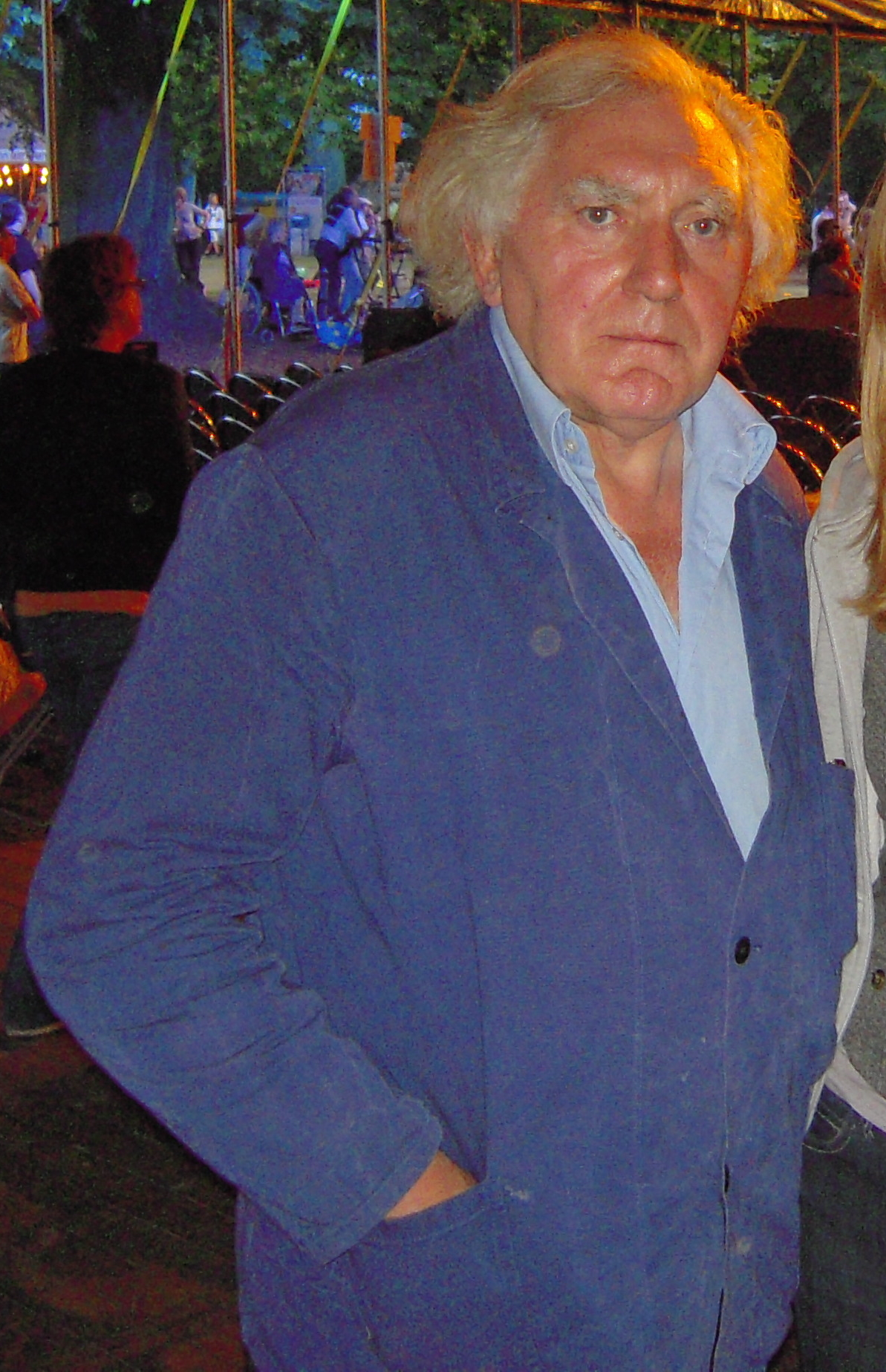
Jan Decleir in 2009

- Shanghai International Film Festival - Golden Goblet: 1993 (Daens)
- Nederlands Film Festival
  - Grolsch Film Award: 1997 (Karakter)
  - Best Actor nomination: 1997 (Karakter)
  - Dutch Culture Award: 2003
  - Best Supporting Actor: 2007 (Wolfsbergen)
  - Best Supporting Actor nomination: 2015 (The Surprise)
- Paris Film Festival - Best Actor: 1998 (Karakter)
- European Film Festival
  - Actor of the Year nomination: 1993 (Daens)
  - Best European Actor nomination: 2003 (Hop)
- Joseph Plateau Award - Best Belgian Actor: 1993 (Daens), 1998 (Karakter), 2004 (The Alzheimer Case)
- Montréal World Film Festival - Best Actor: 2005 (Off Screen)
- Gulden Mira (nl) Career Prize: 2005
- Tiburon International Film Festival - Best Actor: 2008 (A Perfect Match)
- Magritte Awards - Best Supporting Actor: 2010 (The Barons)
- Golden Film Award: 2011 (Nova Zembla)
- Film by the Sea - Grand Acting Award: 2013
- Ostend Film Festival - Best Actor nomination: 2019 (Niet Schieten)

The movie Karakter in which Decleir played the leading role, won the Academy Award for best international feature film in 1997. Prior, Daens was nominated for this Oscar in 1992.

== Filmography ==
Decleir appeared in more than a hundred Belgian, Dutch, French and German movies.

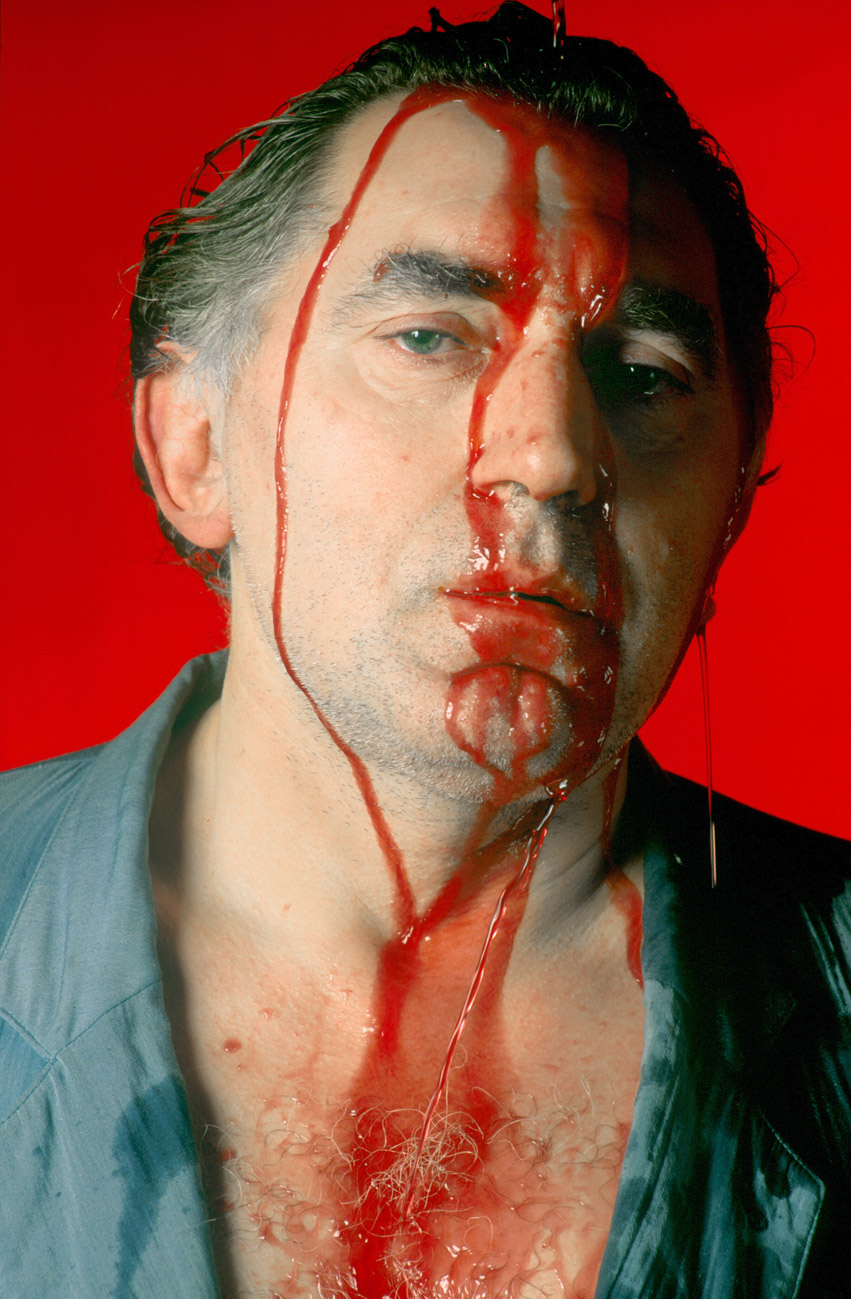
Decleir in "All For Love" (1993)

- Heeft Geleden onder Pontius Pilatus (1966)
- Geboorte en Dood van Dirk Vandersteen jr. (1968)
- Het Huis met de Maskers (1968)
- De Meeuw (1968)
- Klucht van de Brave Moordenaar (1969)
- Koning Lear (1969)
- Het Helleschip (1969)
- Zeven Miljoen Molekulen (1970)
- De Familie Tot (1971)
- Mira, aka Mira of de Teleurgang van de Waterhoek (1971)
- August, August, August (1971)
- Rolande met de Bles (1972)
- The Conscript (1973)
- De Vrek (1974)
- Verloren Maandag (1974)
- Way Out (1974)
- Verbrande Brug (1975)
- Pallieter (1976)
- De Man in de Rok en de Man zonder (1976)
- Niet Alle Dieven Komen Ongelegen (1976)
- Als Schilders Konden Spreken (1976)
- Une Page d'Amour (1978)
- Doodzonde (1978)
- De Proefkonijnen (1979)
- Grueten Broos (1979)
- Le Grand Paysage d'Alexis Droeven (1981)
- Twee Vorstinnen en een Vorst (1981)
- Tijd om Gelukkig te Zijn (1982)
- Het Verleden (1982)
- Toute une nuit (1982)
- Maria Danneels (of het Leven dat We Droomden) (1982)
- Zware Jongens (1984)
- De Loteling (1984)
- John The Fearless (1984)
- De Leeuw van Vlaanderen (1985)
- The van Paemel Family (1986)
- De Tijger (1988)
- Het Eerste Mirakel van Kindeke Jesus (1988)
- Het Sacrament (1990)
- Koko Flanel (1990)
- Dilemma (1990)
- Anchoress (1993)
- Daens (1993)
- Beck – De gesloten kamer (1993)
- Antonia's Line (1995)
- Camping Cosmos (1996)
- Character (1997)
- S. (1998)
- Taming the Floods (1999)
- Retour Den Haag (1999)
- Molokai: The Story of Father Damien (aka Molokai: The Forbidden Island) (1999)
- Shades (1999)
- Kruimeltje (1999)
- Running Free (2000)
- Lijmen/Het Been (2000)
- Mariken (2000)
- De Omweg (2000)
- De Verlossing ( aka The Other Life) (2001)
- Villa des Roses (2002)
- Hop (2002)
- Brush with Fate (2003)
- Rosenstraße (2003)
- SuperTex (= Supertex – Eine Stunde im Paradies) (2003)
- Till Eusterspiegel (=Jester Till) (2003)
- Vlucht der verbeelding (2003)
- De Zaak Alzheimer (2003)
- L'Autre (=The Missing) (2003)
- De Passievrucht (=Father's Affair) (2003)
- Edelweißpiraten (2004)
- De Kus (=The Kiss) (2004)
- Off Screen (2005)
- Een Ander Zijn Geluk (2005)
- Verlengd Weekend (2005)
- Het Paard van Sinterklaas (2005)
- Crusade in Jeans (2006)
- Wolfsbergen (2007) – see Nanouk Leopold
- Firmin (2007)
- Man Zkt Vrouw (A Perfect Match) (2007)
- Blind (2007)
- Waar is het Paard van Sinterklaas (2007)
- Loft (2008)
- The Barons (2009)
- Sœur Sourire (2009)
- Ob Ihr Wollt oder Nicht! (2009)
- Marieke, Marieke (2010)
- Smoorverliefd (2010)
- De schaduw van Bonifatius (2010)
- Nova Zembla (2011)
- The Spring of César (2011)
- De Sint Danst de Tango (2011)
- Finn (2013)
- Flying Home (2014)
- The Surprise (2015)
- Café Derby (2015)
- Ich und Kaminski (2015)
- Ay Ramon! (2015)
- Wat Mannen Willen (2015)
- Szvo (2015)
- Blind Spot (2017)
- This Magnificent Cake! (2018)
- Niet Schieten (2018)
- Sinterklaas en de Wakkere Nachten (2018)
- Een Verkeerde Toekomst (2019)
- The Claus Family (2020)
- The Claus Family 2 (2021)
- The Claus Family 3 (2022)

He is also known from Flemish and Dutch TV series such as:

- Keromar (1971)
- Sil de Strandjutter (1976)
- Adriaen Brouwer (1986)
- Klein Londen, Klein Berlijn (1988)
- Moeder, Waarom Leven Wij? (1993)
- Dag Sinterklaas (1993)
- Ons Geluk (1995)
- Gaston Berghmans Show (1995)
- Kulderzipken (1996)
- Diamant (1997)
- Karakter (1997)
- Retour Den Haag (1999)
- De Grote Boze Wolf Show (2000)
- Stille Waters (2001)
- De 9 Dagen van de Gier (2001)
- Meiden van De Wit (2002)
- W817 (2003)
- Sprookjes (2004-08)
- Koning van de Wereld (2005)
- Als 't Maar Beweegt (2005)
- De Kavijaks (2005)
- Stellenbosch (2007)
- Sinteressante Dingen (2009)
- Met Man en Macht (2013)
- Nieuw Texas (2015)
- Den Elfde van den Elfde (2016)
- Tytgat Chocolat (2017)
- De Bever & Co (2019)

== Theatre ==
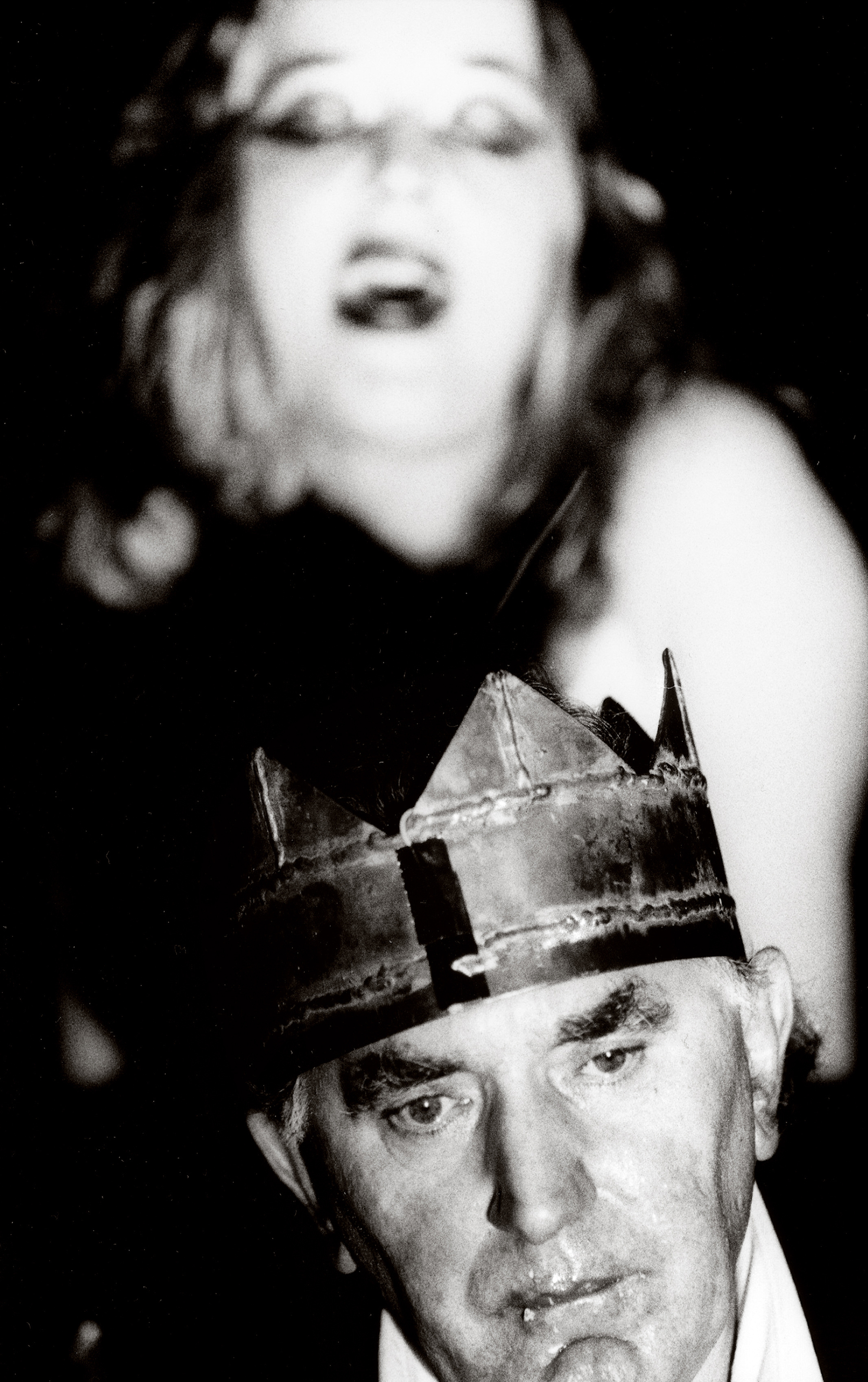
Decleir as "Risjaar modderfokker den Derde" (Richard III) in 1997

- Het Goudland (1966-67)
- De Meeuw (1968)
- Koning Lear (1968-69)
- Koning Jan (1969-70)
- De Familie Tót (1969-70)
- August, August, August (1970-71)
- Een Blijde Gebeurtenis (1970-71)
- Mijnheer Puntila en Zijn Knecht Matti (1971-72)
- De Parochie van Miserie (1972)
- Mistero Buffo (1972-73)
- Ballade voor Grote en Kleine Poppen (1974-75)
- Mezcal (1982-83)
- Obscene Fabels (1984–85)
- Het Offer is te Kort (1985-86)
- Wolfsklem (1986-87)
- DE TIJGER (1986-87)
- Gilles! (1987-88)
- De Meeuw (1988-89)
- Mijn Zoetje Junior (1989-90)
- Dodendans (1989-90)
- Repetitie I (1991-92)
- All for Love (1992-93)
- Vrijen met Dieren (1994-95)
- Meneer Paul (1995-96)
- Edwaar The King (1997-98)
- Richaar Deuzième (1997-98)
- Risjaar Modderfokker den Derde (1997-98)
- Margaretha di Napoli (1997-98)
- En Verlos Ins van het Kwade (1999)
- Lulu (2000-01)
- Bloedarm (2002-03)
- Onder het Melkwoud (2009-10)
- Lucifer (2010-11)
- Bloedarm (2002)
- Onvoltooid Verleden (2012)
- Risjaar Drei (2016-17)
- MARX (2018)
- Landru (2020-21)
