= Bavikhove =

Coordinates: 50°53′N 3°19′E

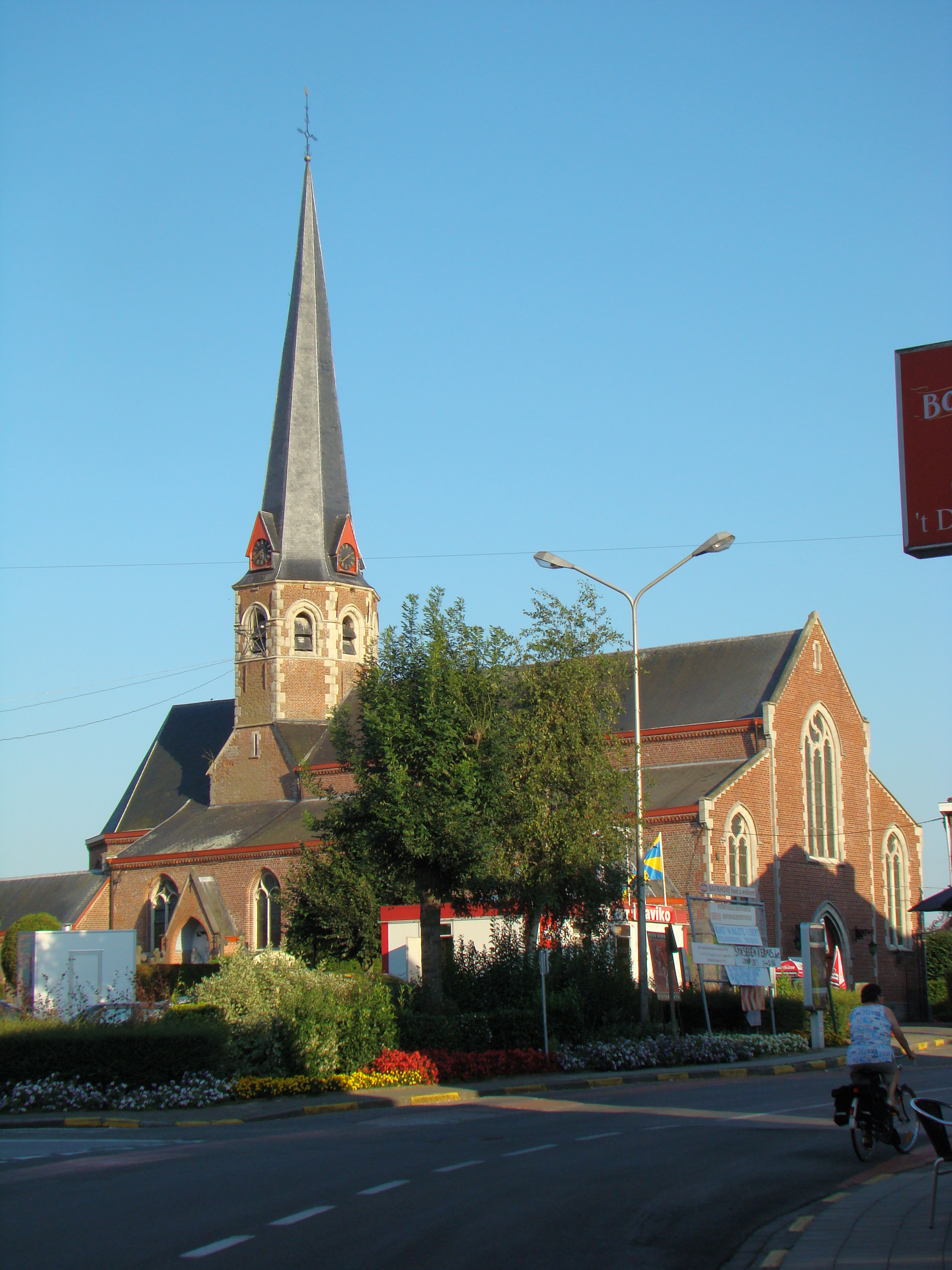
Sint-Amanduskerk (Saint Amand Church)

Bavikhove is a village (deelgemeente) in the Belgian municipality of Harelbeke within the Flemish province of West Flanders. It is located between Harelbeke-centre and Hulste, along the Leie river.

It is known for the Bavik Brewery which brews a pilsner and Wittekerke Beer, among others.

Famous people of Bavikhove include cyclists Stijn Devolder, Leif Hoste, Dirk Demol and Flemish actor and singer Wim Opbrouck. The name of the village was featured in a sketch of In de gloria where Gerrit Callewaert, played by Wim Opbrouck, protested against subtitling West Flemish speakers on Flemish television.
