= Moleneiland =

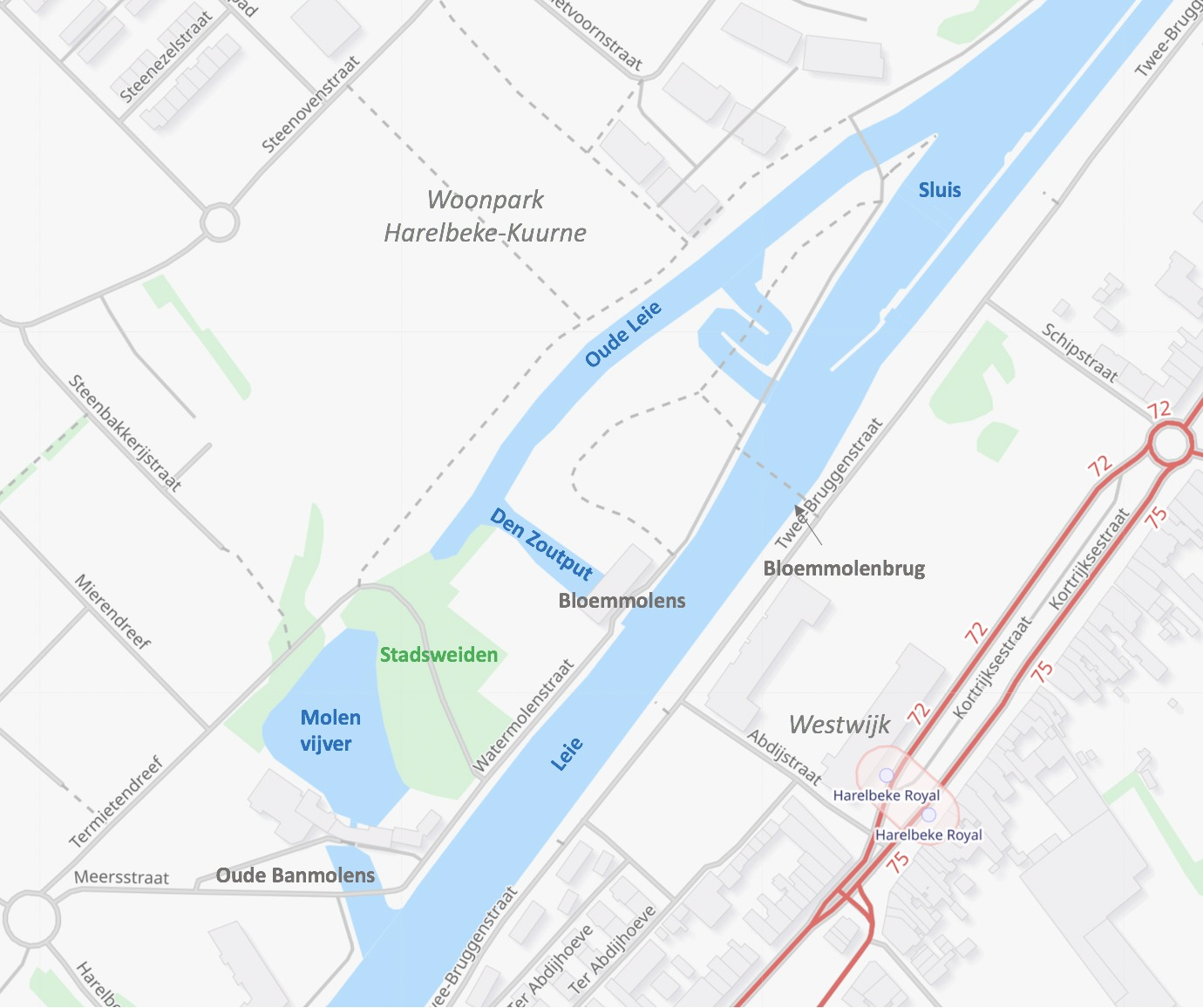
Moleneiland

The Moleneiland is a former island on the Leie where the count's Banmolens in Harelbeke used to be. These water mills have been around since the 11th or 12th century. A lock was subsequently built on the island, where a toll was levied in the name of the Flemish count. Today there are no more working mills. Only the walls of the historic medieval mills remain.
