= Golden Calf Culture Prize =

Dutch film award

The following is a list of winners of the Golden Calf Culture Prize at the NFF.

- 2026 - Halina Reijn
- 2025 - Marina Blok
- 2024 - Felix de Rooy
- 2023 - Digna Sinke
- 2022 - Will Koopman
- 2021 - Mijke de Jong
- 2020 - no award
- 2019 - Jac. Goderie
- 2018 - Monique van de Ven
- 2017 - Gerard Soeteman
- 2016 - Alex van Warmerdam & Marc van Warmerdam
- 2015 - Sandra den Hamer
- 2014 - Burny Bos
- 2013 - Monique van Schendelen
- 2012 - Willeke van Ammelrooy
- 2010 - Rolf Orthel
- 2009 - Doreen Boonekamp
- 2008 - Rutger Hauer
- 2007 - Robby Müller
- 2006 - no award
- 2005 - Hans Kemna
- 2004 - no award
- 2003 - Jan Decleir
- 2002 - Louis van Gasteren
- 2001 - René Scholten
- 1999 - Matthijs van Heijningen
- 1998 - Geoffrey Donaldson
- 1997 - Robbert Wijsmuller
- 1996 - Jeroen Krabbé
- 1995 - Wim Verstappen
- 1994 - Jan de Vaal
- 1993 - Jan Blokker
- 1992 - Paul Verhoeven
- 1991 - Filmkrant
- 1990 - Jos Stelling
- 1989 - Ellen Waller
- 1988 - Johan van der Keuken
- 1987 - Fons Rademakers
- 1986 - Anton Koolhaas
- 1985 - Joris Ivens
- 1984 - J.M.L. Peters
- 1983 - Bert Haanstra
- 1982 - Dan Ireland
- 1981 - J.G.J. Bosman
