= Café Derby =

2015 film

- Theatrical release poster
- Directed by: Lenny Van Wesemael
- Written by: Lenny Van Wesemael; Geert Verbanck
- Produced by: Dirk Impens
- Starring: Wim Opbrouck; Chloë Daxhelet; Monic Hendrickx
- Cinematography: Ruben Impens
- Edited by: Thomas Pooters
- Music by: Lady Linn
- Production company: Menuet
- Release date: 16 September 2015 (Belgium)
- Running time: 93 minutes
- Country: Belgium
- Language: Dutch

Café Derby is a Belgian film directed by Lenny Van Wesemael and released on 11 September 2015 at the Ostend Film Festival. It is based upon the true story of Van Wesemael's father.

== Narrative ==
In 1985, Georges and Renée are forced to close their pub due to what they claim to be "unfair competition" when another pub opens in the neighborhood, selling drinks and food at lower prices. For a source of income, Georges sells washing powders at markets and is a sales representative for very expensive water cleaners.

Without Renée's knowledge, Georges makes an appointment with a real estate agent to visit a pub in a remote neighborhood next to the airport of Sint-Denijs-Westrem. Flanders Expo is also being built in the neighborhood. After Georges learns that Pope John Paul II is to celebrate an open-air mass at the airport, he signs the lease hoping to become rich in a short period of time. There are no competitors nearby and he has been told that the organizing committee for the Pope's visit doesn't intend to sell food or drinks. The only route to the event is via a road which passes the pub. It is estimated that at least 120,000 visitors will attend the event, and Georges is optimistic that at least half of the visitors will consume two drinks at his pub. Moreover, Georges and his pub's regular customers decide to organize a market in the pub's garden with stalls to sell food, drinks, and souvenirs to mark the Pope's visit. With these profits, Georges and Renée would like to retire and secure the future of their five children.

One week before the big event, Georges is informed that the committee will sell drinks and food after all. Although he is a little annoyed, he is still sure that it won’t have a significant impact on his business, as visitors have to pass the pub and the market when they enter and leave the event.

However, on the day of the mass, the lane towards Cafe Derby is closed with safety-barriers so no one can reach the pub or the market. Georges believes that this was done by the committee deliberately for their financial gain. However, they claim that it is the mayor and the city council who made the decision. The gendarmerie does not allow Georges to remove the barriers as they were erected for security reasons. After the fiasco, George is left with a debt of over 500.000 Belgian Francs, is unable to pay the family's rent, and can't afford new stock for resale at the market.

== Cast ==
- Wim Opbrouck as Georges
- Chloë Daxhelet as Sara, Georges' youngest daughter
- Monic Hendrickx as Renée, Georges' second wife
- Charlotte De Wulf as Virginie, Georges' second youngest daughter
- Zinya Van Reeth as Barbara, Georges' eldest daughter
- Robbe Langeraert as Olivier, Georges' youngest son
- Ezra Fieremans as Dimitri, Georges' eldest son
- Andres Doise as Kenneth, classmate of Sara
- Ben Segers as Rob, regular customer
- Geert Van Rampelberg as Frank, regular customer
- Dirk Van Dijck as Jan Van Den Abeele, real estate agent
- Wennie De Ruyck as Kamiel, a drunk
- Günther Lesage as marketer Jo
- Marc Van Eeghem as marketer Steve
- Giskard Van Wesemael as marketer Stef

== Production ==
Filming was carried out between 21 July and 29 August 2014 in a pub in Wondelgem. The original Café Derby was demolished years previously. Since the airport of Sint-Denijs-Westrem is also no longer in existence, these scenes were filmed at the airport in Goetsenhoven.
