= Joachim Bißmeier =

German actor

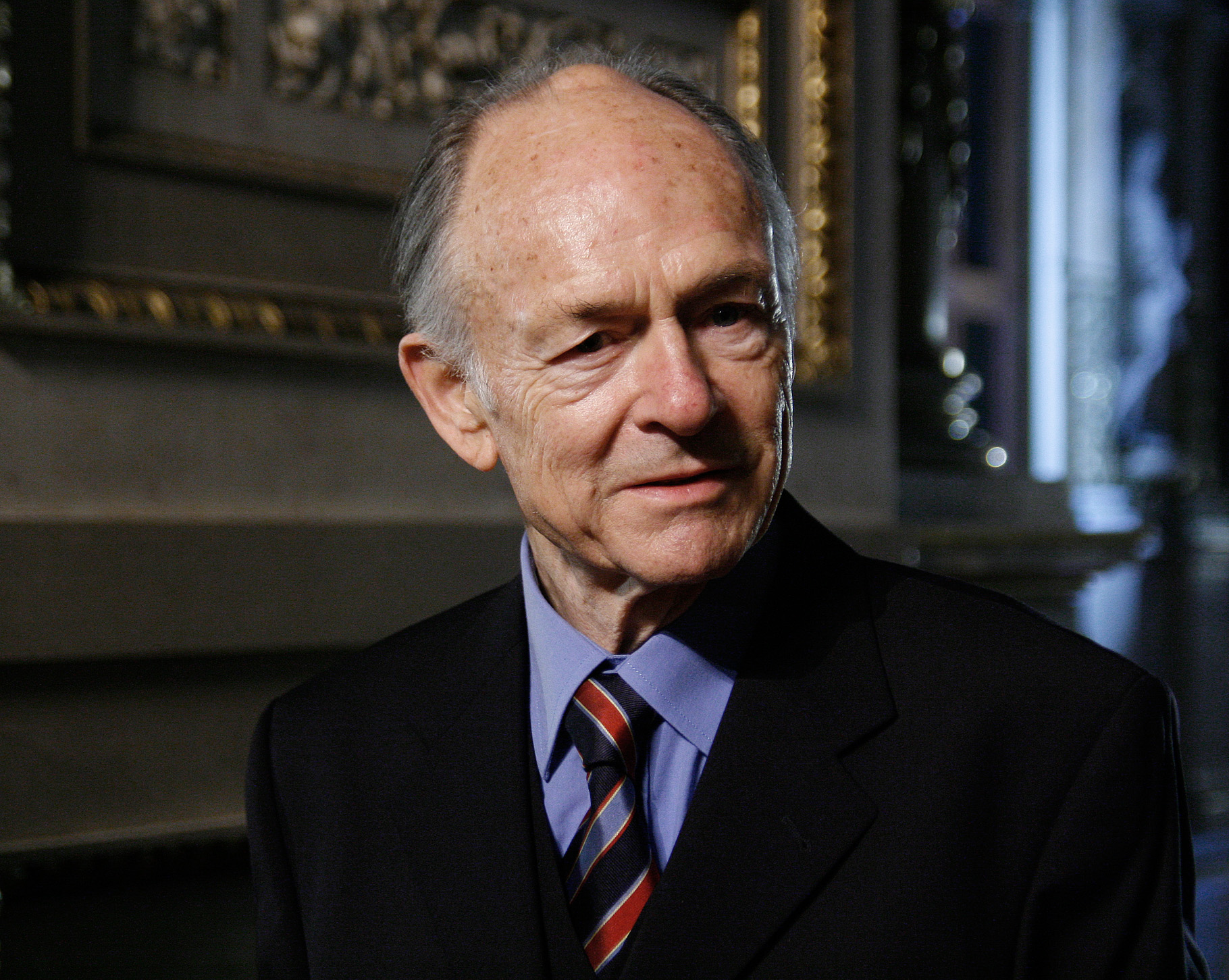
Joachim Bißmeier in 2010

Joachim Bißmeier (born 22 November 1936 in Bonn, Germany) is a German actor in stage, film and television.

== Filmography ==
Year	Title	Role	Notes
1975–1994	Derrick	Mirbach / Johannes Ruland / Dr. Manfred Rieger	3 episodes
1989	Sternberg – Shooting Star	Karl Tedesco	
1991	Saint Peter's Snow		TV film
1999	Sunshine	Dr. Emil Vitak	
2000	Hold-Up	Josef Böckl, Schneider	
2000	De Omweg	Thomas Bernhard	
2003	Anatomy 2	Dr. Schinder	
2004	Before the Fall	Anstaltsleiter	
2004	Stauffenberg	Regens	TV film
2005	Spiele der Macht – 11011 Berlin	Horst Weihmann	TV film
2005	Joyeux Noël	Zimmermann	
2005	A Christmoose Carol	Psychiater	
2006	Klimt	Hugo Moritz	
2009	My Beautiful Neighbor	Karl Seiler	
2011	The Man from Beijing	Professor Lund	TV film
2012	Konrad Adenauer – Stunden der Entscheidung	Konrad Adenauer	TV film
2016	Alone in Berlin	Herr Fromm	
