= Off Screen =

2005 film directed by Pieter Kuijpers

- Theatrical release poster
- Directed by: Pieter Kuijpers
- Written by: Hugo Heinen
- Produced by: Reinier Selen; Edwin van Meurs
- Starring: Jan Decleir; Jeroen Krabbé
- Cinematography: Bert Pot
- Edited by: Job ter Burg
- Music by: Portrait II
- Production companies: Rinkel Film; VPRO
- Distributed by: Independent Films
- Release date: 3 February 2005
- Running time: 94 minutes
- Country: Netherlands
- Language: Dutch
- Box office: $998,041

Off Screen is a 2005 Dutch thriller directed by Pieter Kuijpers.

== Cast ==
- Jan Decleir - John Voerman
- Jeroen Krabbé - Gerard Wesselink
- Astrid Joosten - Herself
- Marjon Brandsma - Elly Voerman
- Chris Comvalius - Heleen Wagemakers

== See also ==
- List of Dutch films of 2005
