= Johanna Bordewijk-Roepman =

Dutch composer (1892–1971)

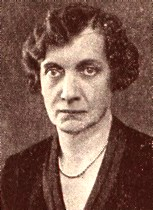
Photograph of Johanne Bordewijk-Roepman

Johanna Bordewijk-Roepman (4 August 1892 – 8 October 1971) was a Dutch composer. She was born in Rotterdam, and began composing in 1917 without formal instruction. In 1937, she studied orchestration with Eduard Flipse and became successful as a composer in the 1940s and 1950s.

In August 1914, she married writer Ferdinand Bordewijk, who contributed lyrics to some of her works. They had a son Robert and daughter Nina. She received an award in 1943 for her Piano Sonata and died in The Hague.

== Works ==
Selected works include:

- Variations II, op. 6 for piano (1919)
- The Garden of Allah for orchestra, after novel by Robert Smythe Hitchens (1936)
- Polish Suite for orchestra (1937)
- Sextet in C major for wind instruments (1938)
- Elog du Vent, text Adolphe Retté, for soprano solo, female choir and orchestra (1939)
- Piano Concerto in A-flat major (1940)
- Les Illuminations, text Arthur Rimbaud, for voice and orchestra (1940)
- Roundabout, opera/operetta in a company, libretto F. Bordewijk (1941)
- Symphony (1942)
- Sonata in E major for piano (1943)
- Epilogue for orchestra (1943)
- Mother of the Fatherland, for the 50-year jubilee of Queen Wilhelmina (1948)
- Plato's death, words F. Bordewijk, symphonic poem for narrator, solo voice, chorus and symphony orchestra (1949)
- Praeludium and Fugue for carillon (1950)
- The sacred circle for four-voice choir (1950)
- Triptych for carillon (1951)
- Roepman, for voice unaccompanied (1953)
- Reconstruction for four- male chorus a cappella (1954)
- The moon, text Emily Dickinson, for chorus a cappella (1961)
