= Suzy Q (film) =

1999 Dutch television film

- Genre: Tragicomedy; Comedy-drama
- Based on: Oh Suzy Q by Frouke Fokkema
- Written by: Frouke Fokkema; Martin Koolhoven
- Directed by: Martin Koolhoven
- Starring: Carice van Houten; Roeland Fernhout; Linda van Dyck; Jack Wouterse; Ricky Koole; Andrew Richard; Miranda Raison
- Music by: Fons Merkies
- Country of origin: Netherlands
- Original languages: Dutch; English

Production
- Executive producer: Emjay Rechsteiner
- Cinematography: Menno Westendorp
- Editor: Job ter Burg
- Running time: 82 minutes
- Production companies: Staccato Films; VPRO

Original release
- Release: May 18, 1999

Suzy Q is a 1999 Dutch tragicomedy television film starring Carice van Houten and directed by Martin Koolhoven. It is based on the childhood memories of Frouke Fokkema, who wrote the script together with Koolhoven. The film featured van Houten in her first leading role; she worked again with Koolhoven on the films AmnesiA and Brimstone.

== Plot ==
The film is set in the sixties and revolves around the teenager Suzy, who is part of an uncaring family: her father is abusive and unemployed, her mother is naive, one brother is the brooding type while the other is habitually stoned.

Suzy surreptitiously manages to gain access to the hotel room of Mick Jagger and Marianne Faithfull during their visit to Amsterdam. Suzy is kissed by her idol, Jagger, and wants to tell the world, but nobody believes her or even wants to hear the story.

== Cast ==
- Carice van Houten as Suzy
- Roeland Fernhout as Zwier
- Linda van Dyck as Ruth (Suzy's mother)
- Jack Wouterse as Ko (Suzy's father)
- Michiel Huisman as Palmer
- Ricky Koole as Betty
- Kim la Croix as Hanna
- Cees Geel as Jimmy
- Andrew Richard as Mick Jagger
- Miranda Raison as Marianne Faithfull
- Hugo Koolschijn as Photographer
- Leonoor Pauw as Receptionist
- Halina Reijn as Prostitute
- Frans de Wit as Bartender
- Joanne Gomperts as Girl outside hotel

== Production ==
Fokkema approached producer Emjay Rechsteiner to turn one of her old plays into a feature film. The play was called Oh Suzy Q, and revolved around a girl and her dysfunctional family in the 1960s who met Mick Jagger. Martin Koolhoven was hired as director, after Rechsteiner was present at screening of Koekoek!, a film Koolhoven made during his film studies in Amsterdam. Koolhoven would rewrite the play into a screenplay, and would turn Suzy into the through line of the story.

On urging by casting director Job Gosschalk, Carice van Houten was cast in the lead role even though she was around 22 years old at the time. They were only looking at 16-years-old actresses previously. The project had difficulties getting of the ground, Netherlands Film Fund refused to provide funding and they ran into legal issues with music licences. The film contained music from The Rolling Stones, Nancy Sinatra and Jimi Hendrix, whose music were prohibitively expensive to license. Any attempts to bring the film to movie theatres proved impossible. In collaboration with VPRO, they turned into television film as part of Telefilm, an initiative to bring Dutch-language films to public television. This made possible for them to bypass their problems with music licensing as the Dutch public broadcasting system had a separate licensing deal with collecting society Buma/Stemra.

The film is a joint production of Staccato Films and VPRO.

The title refers to The Rolling Stones' cover of the Dale Hawkins song Susie Q.

== Release ==
Suzy Q was broadcast on Nederland 3 by VPRO on May 18, 1999. In 2013, the film was rebroadcast again on December 3 as part of European film week by NPO Cultura.

In 2014, to save his project from obscurity, Martin Koolhoven published the film on YouTube. He also asked for the film to be distributed via torrent sites, which promptly happened.

== Reception ==
Suzy Q won various awards, including a Gouden Kalf for van Houten. Despite being a film made for TV, it was the most decorated Dutch film of 1999. Due to the frequent use of music by the likes of The Rolling Stones, The Turtles, Jimi Hendrix, Tee-Set and Booker T & the MG's, the film was never released in cinemas or on DVD.

=== Awards and nominations ===
Year	Association	Category	Recipient(s)	Result	Ref(s).
2000	Festival International de Programmes Audiovisuels	Best Film	Maarten Koolhoven	Won	
2000	Festival International de Programmes Audiovisuels	Best Actor	Jack Wouterse	Won	
2000	Festival International de Programmes Audiovisuels	Best Screenplay	Frouke Fokkema	Won	
