= Our Girls =

2025 Dutch film by Mike van Diem

- English-language release poster
- Dutch: Voor de meisjes
- Directed by: Mike van Diem
- Screenplay by: Mike van Diem
- Based on: We Doen Wat We Kunnen by Lykele Muus
- Produced by: Koji Nelissen; Derk-Jan Warrink; Marijn Wigman
- Starring: Thekla Reuten; Fedja van Huêt; Noortje Herlaar
- Cinematography: Martin Gschlacht
- Edited by: Sander Vos
- Music by: Ruben De Gheselle
- Production companies: Keplerfilm; Nuts & Bolts Film Company; Schubert; A Private View
- Distributed by: Dutch FilmWorks (Netherlands)
- Release date: October 2, 2025 (Netherlands)
- Running time: 103 minutes
- Countries: Netherlands; Austria; Belgium
- Language: Dutch
- Budget: €6.5 million (US$7.4 million)
- Box office: US$3.92 million

Our Girls (Dutch: Voor de meisjes) is a 2025 Dutch thriller drama film, written and directed by Mike van Diem. It is based on the book We Do What We Can by Lykele Muus. It is set during an idyllic holiday in the Austrian Alps, where the long-standing friendship between two couples spins out of control.

The film received theatrical distribution in the Netherlands, Austria, Germany and Belgium. While critical response was mostly positive, it was considered a box-office failure, grossing only US$3.92 million on a US$7.4 million budget.

At the 2025 Golden Calf Awards in Utrecht, the film was nominated in 4 categories, 3 of which were won.

== Premise ==
For years, two couples have shared the perfect holiday home in the Austrian Alps and enjoyed each other's company every summer. But when their teenage daughters are involved in a shocking accident, their long-standing friendship is put to a new, unthinkable test. As each couple works to uncover the truth and save their own daughter, long-buried tensions and uncomfortable truths erupt, forcing them to abandon any pretence of decency and to question all of their certainties as spouses, parents and friends. When it comes to saving your child, is there any line you wouldn't cross, or is it true that anything goes?

== Cast ==
- Thekla Reuten: Anouk
- Fedja van Huêt: Danny
- Noortje Herlaar: Gwen
- Valentijn Dhaenens: Erik
- Karl Markovics: Dr. Maier
- Rosa van Leeuwen: Madelon
- Frédérique van Baarsen: Elise
- Jeremy Miliker: Ralph
- Proschat Madani: The cardiologist
- Tim Seyfi: Ahmed Özdemir
- Corinna Pumm: Nurse Wagner
- Wolfgang Oliver: Gasthof, the waiter
- Inaya Ulgen: Young Madelon
- Charlotte Haager: Young Elise

== Production ==
The film was developed as an adaptation of Lykele Muus’s novel We Do What We Can (We Doen Wat We Kunnen), with a screenplay written by Mike van Diem. The film had support from the Netherlands Film Fund, the Flemish Audiovisual Fund, the Austrian Film Institute, and Eurimages, totalling a budget of €6.5 million.

Principal photography took place between August and October 2024. According to the Austrian Film Institute, the production shot for 32 days, with filming spread across Tyrol, Salzburg, Lower Austria, and Vienna. Although the story is set in the Alps, not every scene was filmed exclusively in mountain locations.

== Release ==
Our Girls opened the 2025 Netherlands Film Festival in Utrecht as the Opening Film NFF 2025, with public screenings on September 26, 2025 at the Utrecht City Theatre and the Louis Hartlooper Complex. Dutch FilmWorks later rolled the film out in 120 cinemas across the Netherlands on October 2, 2025.
