= Character (film) =

- Theatrical release poster
- Directed by: Mike van Diem
- Written by: Mike van Diem; Laurens Geels; Ruud van Megen
- Based on: Karakter by Ferdinand Bordewijk
- Produced by: Laurens Geels
- Starring: Jan Decleir; Fedja van Huêt; Betty Schuurman; Tamar van den Dop; Victor Löw; Hans Kesting
- Cinematography: Rogier Stoffers
- Edited by: Jessica de Koning
- Music by: Het Paleis van Boem
- Production companies: First Floor Features; Almerica Film; NPS
- Distributed by: Buena Vista International
- Release date: 17 April 1997
- Running time: 122 minutes
- Countries: Netherlands; Belgium
- Language: Dutch
- Budget: $4.5 million
- Box office: $713,413

Character (Dutch: Karakter) is a 1997 Dutch-language historical drama film directed by Mike van Diem from a script he co-wrote with Laurens Geels and Ruud van Megen. It is based on the 1938 Dutch best-selling novel by Ferdinand Bordewijk. The film won the Academy Award for Best Foreign Language Film at the 70th Academy Awards. The film stars Fedja van Huêt, Jan Decleir, and Betty Schuurman.

== Plot ==
In 1930's Rotterdam, A. B. Dreverhaven, a dreaded bailiff, is found dead, with a knife stuck in his stomach. The obvious suspect is Jacob Willem Katadreuffe, an ambitious young lawyer who worked his way up from poverty, always managing to overcome Dreverhaven's personal attacks against him. Katadreuffe was seen leaving Dreverhaven's office on the afternoon of the murder. He is arrested and taken to police headquarters, where he reflects back on the story of his long relationship with Dreverhaven, who, police learn, is also Katadreuffe's father.

The story begins when Katadreuffe's taciturn mother, Joba, worked as a housekeeper for Dreverhaven. During that time, they had sex only once (it is implied that the encounter was forced upon Joba). She becomes pregnant and leaves her employer to make a living for herself and her son. Time and again, she rejects Dreverhaven's offers by mail of money and marriage.

Even as a child, Katadreuffe finds that his path crosses with Dreverhaven, often with dire consequences. When he is arrested for becoming involved in a boyish theft and tells the police that Dreverhaven is his father, Dreverhaven refuses to recognize him as his son. When, as a young man, he unwittingly takes a loan from a bank that Dreverhaven owns to purchase a failed cigar store, Dreverhaven sues him to win the money back and force him into bankruptcy. Still, Katadreuffe manages to pay back the debt, finding a clerical position in the law firm retained to pursue him for his cigar-store debt. He manages to secure this job, even though most of his education is derived from reading an incomplete English-language encyclopedia that he found as a boy in his mother's apartment; studying this set, he managed to teach himself English, which turns out to be a valuable talent in the eyes of his employers.

After paying back the cigar-store debt, Katadreuffe immediately seeks a second loan from Dreverhaven, so that he can finance his education and legal studies and, ultimately, take and pass the bar examination. Dreverhaven agrees, on the condition that he can call back the loan at any time. Despite the bailiff's efforts to hinder his son, Katadreuffe passes his bar examination and qualifies as a lawyer. On the afternoon when his firm holds a celebration of his becoming a lawyer (the day with which the film begins, the day of the murder), Katadreuffe storms into Dreverhaven's office to confront his lifelong tormentor, the bailiff. Katadreuffe reacts with rage to Dreverhaven's congratulations, and his offer of a handshake, and, though he at first turns to leave, he runs toward Dreverhaven and attempts to attack him. After a bloody and angry brawl, Katadreuffe is witnessed leaving the bailiff's office.

However, the police discover that Katadreuffe left Dreverhaven at 5:00 p.m., though an examination of the bailiff's body reveals that Dreverhaven died at 11:00 p.m. The police finally reveal to Katadreuffe that Dreverhaven actually committed suicide. After Katadreuffe is cleared, a police official hands him a document, left by Dreverhaven's lawyer, that turns out to be the bailiff's will, which leaves all of his considerable wealth to Katadreuffe. The will is signed "Vader" (Father).

In a side plot, he is close to Lorna, the attractive secretary of the law firm. At a company party, he interrupts the festivities to make an announcement, which turns out to be his determination to study Law. Expecting a different kind of proposal, she leaves the party and the firm. His mother berates him for sacrificing a happy life for his ambition,

== Cast ==
- Jan Decleir as A. B. Dreverhaven
- Fedja van Huêt as Jacob Willem Katadreuffe
  - Jasper Gottlieb and Marius Gottlieb as Jacob (Age 9)
  - Pavlik Jansen op de Haar as Jacob (Age 12)
- Betty Schuurman as Joba
- Tamar van den Dop as Lorna Te George
- Victor Löw as De Gankelaar
- Hans Kesting as Jan Maan
- Lou Landré as Rentenstein
- Bernhard Droog as Stroomkoning
- Frans Vorstman as Inspecteur de Bree
- Fred Goessens as Schuwagt

== Production ==
Principal photography began in Rotterdam on 30 May 1996. Most scenes of the film were shot in Wrocław, Poland.

== Release ==
Sony Pictures Classics acquired the distribution rights of the film for release in the United States.

=== 2020 4K restoration ===
In 2020, Dutch FilmWorks announced they would be releasing a 4K restoration of the film throughout different cinemas. This restoration was performed from the original negative by the Eye Film Institute under the supervision of Mike van Diem. It premiered at the Netherlands Film Festival op 29 September 2020.

== Reception ==
Character has an approval rating of 92% on review aggregator website Rotten Tomatoes, based on 26 reviews, and an average rating of 7.6/10.

The film received mixed reviews during its U.S. release. Janet Maslin of The New York Times praised the film's cinematography and Decleir's performance, but criticises the pacing, writing that "The story is long and episodic, but its larger trajectory is not always evident. Something important seems lost in translation".

== Accolades ==
Accolades received by character
Year	Award	Category	Recipient(s)	Result	Ref.
1997	Netherlands Film Festival	Golden Calf for Best Director	Mike van Diem	Nominated	
1997	Netherlands Film Festival	Golden Calf for Best Feature Film	Laurens Geels	Won	
1997	Netherlands Film Festival	Golden Calf for Best Actor	Jan Decleir	Nominated	
1997	Netherlands Film Festival	Golden Calf for Best Actress	Betty Schuurman	Nominated	
1998	Academy Awards	Best International Feature Film	Mike van Diem	Won	

== See also ==
- List of submissions to the 70th Academy Awards for Best Foreign Language Film
- List of Dutch submissions for the Academy Award for Best Foreign Language Film
