= Luger (1982 film) =

1982 film

- Theatrical release poster
- Directed by: Theo van Gogh
- Written by: Theo van Gogh
- Starring: Thom Hoffman
- Edited by: Theo van Gogh
- Music by: Rainer Hensel
- Release date: 1982
- Running time: 85 minutes
- Country: Netherlands
- Languages: Dutch; German

Luger is a 1982 Dutch film directed by Theo van Gogh. The film was written and directed (his debut) by van Gogh and was filmed in black and white.

== Cast ==
The lead role (Chris Luger) is played by Thom Hoffman who plays a psychopath with fascist tendencies. The other main role is played by Laurien Hildering (her only acting credit).

== Synopsis ==
The film is about the kidnapping of the mentally impaired daughter of a millionaire. The kidnapping is an attempt to get rich quickly by the main character. The father refuses, however, to pay the ransom.

== Controversy ==
The film was controversial as it contained a scene in which two kittens were put in a washing machine.
