= False Light =

1993 film

- Theatrical release poster
- Directed by: Theo van Gogh
- Written by: Theo van Gogh (scenario), Joost Zwagerman (novel)
- Produced by: Matthijs van Heijningen
- Cinematography: Tom Erisman
- Edited by: René Weigmans
- Music by: Rainer Hensel
- Distributed by: Concorde Film
- Release date: 4 February 1993
- Running time: 90 minutes
- Country: Netherlands
- Language: Dutch

False Light or Vals licht is a 1993 Dutch film directed by Theo van Gogh. It was based on the eponymous novel by Joost Zwagerman about a young teenager who is attracted by the life of prostitutes.

== Cast ==
- Amanda Ooms as Lizzie Rosenfeld
- Ellik Bargai as Simon Prins
- Thom Hoffman as Wesley
- Tom Jansen as Philip
- Marijke Veugelers as Simon's mother
- Cas Enklaar as Simon's father
- Dik Boutkan
