= It Will Never Be Spring =

Wildgroei
- Directed by: Frouke Fokkema
- Produced by: Matthijs van Heijningen
- Cinematography: Gerard Vandenberg
- Distributed by: Concorde Film
- Release date: 14 October 1993
- Running time: 94 minutes
- Country: Netherlands
- Language: Dutch

It Will Never Be Spring or Wildgroei is a 1993 Dutch film directed by Frouke Fokkema. The film was screened at the 33rd International Critics' Week of the 1994 Cannes Film Festival.

== Cast ==
- Hilde Van Mieghem as Lin Lemmerse
- Thom Hoffman as Emile Lombardo
- Ellen Ten Damme as Maro
- Julien Schoenaerts as Detief
- Hans Croiset as Duvekot
- Fiet Dekker as Mien
- Pim Lambeau as Johanna
- Ger Thijs as Casanas
- Joop Cramer as Accordeonist op feest
- René Eljon as Ober
- Henk Kemps as Boris, postbode
- Sep Van Kampen as Mooie boerenjongen
