= Mike van Diem =

Dutch film director

- Born: 1959 (age 66–67); Druten, Netherlands
- Occupations: Film director, writer
- Awards: Best Foreign Language Film; 1997 Character

Mike van Diem (born 1959, in Druten, grew up in Sittard) is a Dutch film director.

== Career ==
In 1990, his short film Alaska won a Golden Calf for best short film and the Student Academy Award for best foreign student film in the drama category. In 1998, he received the Academy Award for Best Foreign Language Film for the film Character based on the 1938 novel Karakter by Ferdinand Bordewijk.

He has also directed commercials.

== Selected filmography ==
- Character (1997)
- The Surprise (2015)
- Tulipani, Love, Honour and a Bicycle (2017)
- Our Girls (2025)
