= De Omweg =

2000 film

- Theatrical release poster
- Directed by: Frouke Fokkema
- Written by: Frouke Fokkema
- Based on: De Omweg by Frouke Fokkema
- Produced by: Matthijs van Heijningen; Erich Lackner
- Starring: Tamar van den Dop; Joachim Bißmeier; Willeke van Ammelrooy; Jan Decleir
- Cinematography: Wolfgang Simon
- Edited by: August Verschueren
- Music by: Ton van der Meer; Paul Koek
- Production companies: Sigma Pictures Productions; Lotus Film; Lichtspiel Filmproduktion
- Distributed by: RCV Film Distribution
- Release date: 9 November 2000 (Netherlands)
- Running time: 98 minutes
- Countries: Netherlands; Austria
- Languages: Dutch; German

De Omweg (English: The Detour) is a 2000 Dutch semi-biographical road movie drama film written and directed by Frouke Fokkema and starring Tamar van den Dop, Joachim Bißmeier, Willeke van Ammelrooy, Jan Decleir and Thom Hoffman. Based on Fokkema's play by the same name.

The movie was first shown at 2000's Netherlands Film Festival, where Tamar van den Dop was nominated for best actress. The film later went nationwide on November 9, 2000 to few ticket sales. During filming van den Dop recorded behind the scenes footage and discussed her own experiences on set, this would be turned into a behind the scenes documentary called, "Scheppen gaat van au!"

== Cast ==
- Tamar van den Dop as Joanna
- Joachim Bißmeier as Thomas Bernhard
- Willeke van Ammelrooy as Joanna's Mother
- Jan Decleir as Joanna's Father
- Liz Snoijink as gynecologist
- Thom Hoffman as Camille Kleber
- Peer Mascini as Luc de Koning
- Therese Affolter as Anna
- Inge Rosenberg as Aunt Hedda
- Dimme Treurniet as Willem
- Marlies Heuer as Bobby
- Halina Reijn as Sara

== Production ==
De Omweg is based on Fokkema's debut play that she wrote in 1982, it details her own meeting with her idol, the Austrian playwright Thomas Bernhard. Fokkema had been working for ten years to get the adaptation of the ground, initially she had difficulties securing a subsidy from the Austrian government. The film received around 152.000 euro in funding from Eurimages. In collaboration with the local Rotterdam government in terms of available financial support and willingness to cooperate, some of the filming took place in the city in 1999.

== Release ==
The film had a limited release in Dutch theaters on 9 November 2000.
