= A Perfect Match (film) =

- Theatrical release poster
- Dutch: Man zkt Vrouw
- Directed by: Miel Van Hoogenbemt
- Written by: Pierre De Clercq; Jean-Claude Van Rijckeghem
- Produced by: Jean-Claude Van Rijckeghem; Patrick Quinet
- Starring: Jan Decleir; Maria Popistașu; Wim Opbrouck
- Cinematography: Frank van den Eeden
- Edited by: Ludo Troch
- Music by: Spinvis
- Production companies: A Private View; Artémis Productions; Eyeworks Egmond; Marmont Production
- Distributed by: Kinepolis Film Distribution
- Release date: 8 August 2007 (Belgium)
- Running time: 107 minutes
- Country: Belgium
- Language: Dutch
- Box office: $1 million

A Perfect Match (Dutch: Man zkt Vrouw, lit. 'Man Seeks Woman') is a 2007 Belgian romantic comedy-drama film directed by Miel van Hoogenbemt and written by Pierre De Clercq and Jean-Claude Van Rijckeghem. It stars Jan Decleir, Maria Popistașu and Wim Opbrouck.

== Plot ==
Leopold, a retired school teacher, tries to find a life partner through an online dating service. Julien, Leopold's very faithful friend, helps him in this process. Leopold fills out the form and finds a few matches. After meeting one after another, he realises that none is appropriate for him. On the first day of Leopold's retirement, his housekeeper announces she will be leaving to her native Romania in order to be with her daughter, but she manages to find a replacement named Alina.

Leopold goes to pick her up at the railway station and also meets with one match at a coffee shop, whom he had known from the website. After meeting they come home and Leopold finds that Alina is a disastrous maidservant. Meanwhile, Leopold and Julien continue searching for the right match. A few days later, Alina finds the whole preparation-for-wedding movement. She also joins this adventurous process.

After several attempts, they fail to find the perfect match. Leopold ends up falling in love with Alina, who is 40 years younger than he is, but is hesitant to confess his feelings for her. Leopold makes some funny attempts to woo her. In one of these attempts, he manages to convince Alina to join him on a European countryside tour. Leopold convinces her saying that he goes on trip every summer to draw some mountain pictures. Alina agrees and the much romantic-funny event begins.

As they arrive at their destination, Alina finds it very exciting and livable. She does not let go any opportunity to enjoy the moment. At the same time, Leopold engages himself in drawing and observing Alina's moods. Suddenly at one place, Alina finds the truth and becomes angry with Leopold. Though she disappears from his sight, she appears in full attracted dress at Leopold's hotel room realising that he is one of her perfect matches.

As Alina's boyfriend had rejected her after long-time relationship making her pregnant, she accepts Leopold saying "despite...zero...matching points..." The couple returns home with bountiful of lovely memories and plans their future life. At the same time, Alina's boyfriend appears in the picture wooing her. Though she was not so happy to start a fresh life with him, Leopold explains to her how much her boyfriend is regretful because of his unforgivable mistake. Finally, Alina gives Leopold a leaving kiss and makes her mind up for a new start.

Leopold helps to start her boyfriend's car and looks at Alina's face until it disappears.

== Cast ==
- Jan Decleir as Leopold
- Maria Popistașu as Alina
- Wim Opbrouck as Julien
- Tom Van Bauwel as Bastijns
- Gert Portael as Simone
- Mieke Bouve as Ingrid
