= Overvallers in de Dierentuin =

- Theatrical release poster
- Directed by: Christ Stuur
- Written by: Cindy Peppelenbosch (book), Felix Thijssen (writer)
- Production company: Cine/Vista
- Distributed by: Concorde Film
- Release date: 19 July 1984
- Running time: 92 minutes
- Country: Netherlands
- Language: Dutch

Overvallers in de Dierentuin is a 1984 Dutch film directed by Christ Stuur.

== Cast ==
- Lex de Regt... Ros
- Paul van Soest ... Plumming
- Maurice Schmeink ... Haas
- Miranda Sanders ... Sonja
- Martin Versluys ... Steef
- Cor van Rijn ... Directeur Vereboer
- Marlous Fluitsma ... Vlier
- Marina de Graaf... Secretaresse Wendy
- Bartho Braat ... Tractorman Piet
- Herman Haijemaije ... Bladenman Kees
- Nico Schaap ... Agent Willem
