= Blind (2007 film) =

- Theatrical release poster
- Directed by: Tamar van den Dop
- Written by: Tamar van den Dop
- Produced by: Petra Goedings; Erwin Provoost; Hilde De Laere
- Starring: Halina Reijn; Jan Decleir; Joren Seldeslachts
- Cinematography: Gregor Meerman
- Edited by: Sander Vos
- Music by: Junkie XL
- Production companies: Phanta Vision Film International; MMG Film & TV Production; Klas Film
- Distributed by: Buena Vista International (Netherlands); Kinepolis Film Distribution (Belgium); Big Bang (Bulgaria)
- Release dates: 8 February 2007 (Netherlands); 28 February 2007 (Belgium)
- Running time: 98 minutes
- Countries: Netherlands; Belgium; Bulgaria
- Language: Dutch
- Budget: €3.1 million
- Box office: €107.000

Blind is a 2007 Dutch romantic drama film written and directed by Tamar van den Dop, in her directorial debut, and starring Joren Seldeslachts, Halina Reijn, Katelijne Verbeke and Jan Decleir. The film follows a blossoming romance between a young blind man and an albino woman who is hired by the man's mother to read for him.

== Plot ==
Ruben (Joren Seldeslachts) is a lone and unbalanced young man who lost his sight in childhood. Marie (Halina Reijn) is an albino woman of temperate look and with a lot of insecurities. She has a beautiful voice and along with Ruben shares a mutual love for books and tales. Ruben's mother hires her as a reader to read her son books orally. While they live in a mansion, between these two lonely souls sparks love, but will love still be blind if the man recovers from his blindness?

== Cast ==
- Joren Seldeslachts plays Ruben Rietlander, a main protagonist character who had lost his sight in childhood.
- Halina Reijn plays Marie, a main protagonist character that falls in love with Ruben.
- Katelijne Verbeke plays Catherine Rietlander, Ruben's mother.
- Jan Decleir plays Dr. Victor Verbeecke.
- Annemieke Bakker plays Romy.

== Production ==
Production started in december in Belgium and Bulgary, and the script was written by Tamar van den Dop who also directed the movie. Other companies and people involved in production of this movie include: Cinenumerique - sound re-recording, Film Finances - completion guarantor, Herrie - unit publicity, Kemna Casting - casting, Warnier Studio Amsterdam - dolby mastering, sound post-production, Valkieser Capital Images - special effects.

== Reception ==
Blind was screened at the Toronto International Film Festival and was received positively. Film critics who reviewed other films which had featured on Toronto International Film Festival gave it positive scores. As Radheyan Simonpillai, a film critic from web based version of Now magazine, noted that a scene "where two hands fondle through a milky white veil is about as sensual as they come". Another critic David Nusair of Reel Film Reviews gave it 3 stars out of 4.
