= Wasted! =

1996 film by Aryan Kaganof

Naar de Klote!
- Theatrical release poster
- Directed by: Aryan Kaganof
- Written by: Aryan Kaganof, Ton Van Der Lee
- Distributed by: Concorde Film
- Release date: 14 November 1996
- Running time: 104 minutes
- Country: Netherlands
- Language: Dutch

Wasted! (Dutch: Naar de Klote!) is a 1996 Dutch drama film directed by Aryan Kaganof. It is the first film depicting the Electronic Music Scene in the Netherlands.

The film was made during the time when the Dutch gabber scene was at its highpoint. The same was true for the recreational use of ecstasy by Dutch youngsters at such parties.

== Plot ==
Two teenagers in love go to the big city (Amsterdam) and wind up in the house and trance scene. The boy ends up spending his days smoking marijuana; the girl is introduced to ecstasy and runs into the drug underworld by selling the substance. At some point in the film, they lose contact and seek to be reunited.

== Title ==
The title of the film comes from the hit Alles naar de Klote (Everything Wasted!) of the Rotterdam hardcore band De Euromasters.

The film introduces an electronic music score with tracks by Party Animals, Flamman & Abraxas and Deepzone.

== Cast ==
- Fem van der Elzen as Jacqueline
- Tygo Gernandt as Martijn
- Thom Hoffman as DJ Cowboy
- Hugo Metsers as JP
- Mike Libanon as Winston
