= Ferdinand Bordewijk =

Dutch writer

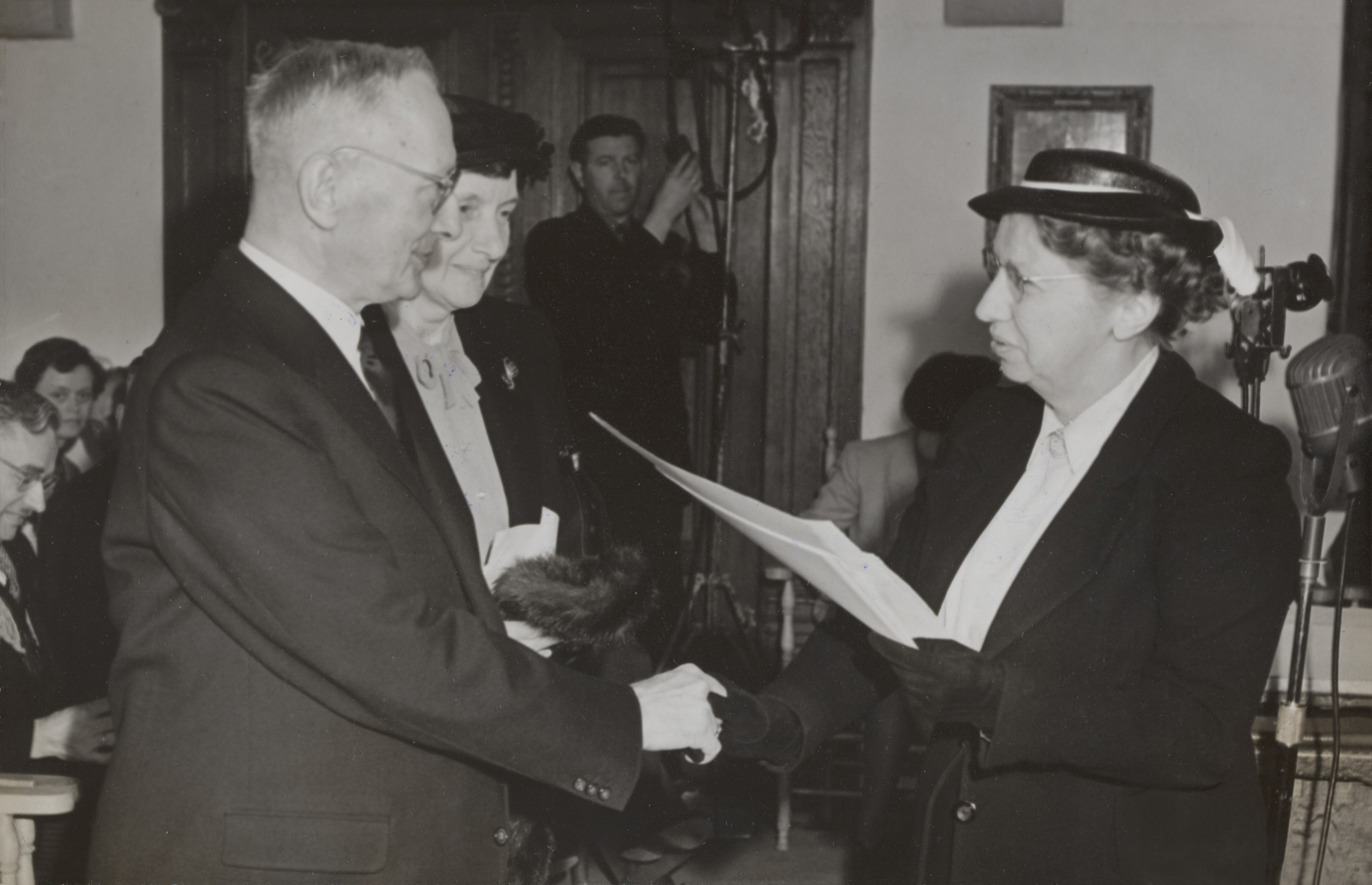
Bordewijk (1954, P.C. Hooft Award)

Ferdinand Bordewijk (10 October 1884 – 28 April 1965) was a Dutch author. His style, which is terse and symbolic, is considered to belong to New Objectivity and magic realism. He was awarded the P. C. Hooft Award in 1953 and the Constantijn Huygens Prize in 1957. He wrote novels and short stories; of his novels, his 1938 Character is canonical in the Netherlands, and was the basis for a 1997 film of the same name.

== Biography ==
Ferdinand Bordewijk was born in Amsterdam, and moved with his family to The Hague when he was ten. He studied law at Leiden University. After graduation, he worked first at a Rotterdam law firm and became an independent lawyer in Schiedam in 1919, remaining an inhabitant of The Hague all of his life. He was married to the composer Johanna Bordewijk-Roepman. He wrote the libretto for her opera Rotonde (1941).

== Works ==
His first published work was a volume of poetry titled Paddestoelen ("Mushrooms") under the pseudonym Ton Ven. It was not particularly well received.

His breakthrough came with the short novels Blokken ("Blocks", 1931), Knorrende Beesten ("Growling Animals", 1933) and Bint (1934), later frequently published together as a set of three, followed by the longer works Rood paleis ("Red Palace", 1936) and Karakter (1938, translated into English as Character in 1966). Blokken was a dystopian work which was perceived as a criticism of communism. It is comparable to Aldous Huxley's Brave New World, which appeared one year later and which Bordewijk deemed to be junk ("een enorme prul").

== Bibliography ==
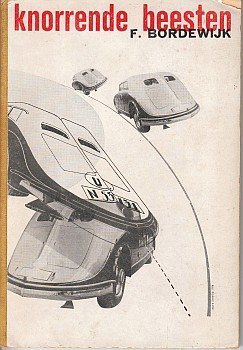
Knorrende Beesten (1934)

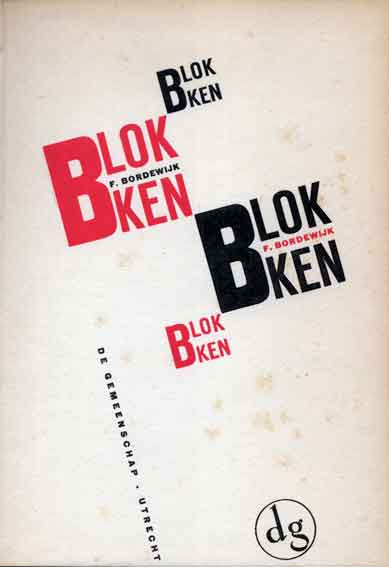
Blokken (1931)

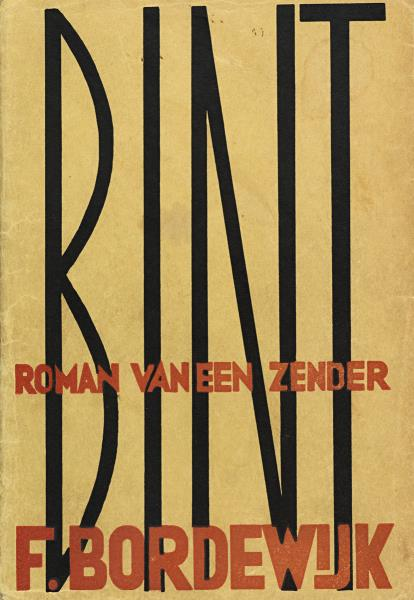
Bint (1934)

- 1916 – Paddestoelen (under the pseudonym Ton Ven)
- 1918 – Een koning van de frase (A king of the phrase) in: Groot Nederland
- 1919 – Fantastische vertellingen, verhalen (Fantastic tales), short stories
- 1923 – Fantastische vertellingen, tweede bundel (Fantastic tales II), short stories
- 1924 – Fantastische vertellingen, derde bundel (Fantastic tales III), short stories
- 1931 – Blokken (Cubes), novel
- 1933 – Knorrende beesten; de roman van een parkeerseizoen (novel)
- 1934 – Bint, de roman van een zender (novel)
- 1935 – De laatste eer, grafrede (The last honor, eulogy)
- 1935 – 't Ongure Huissens
- 1936 – Rood paleis; ondergang van een eeuw (Red palace, downfall of the century)
- 1936 – IJzeren agaven; studie in zwart met kleuren
- 1937 – De wingerdrank (short stories)
- 1938 – Karakter; roman van zoon en vader (novel); English translation: Character, from Dutch by E. M. Prince; London, Peter Owen, 1966, etc. Filmed as 1997 Dutch/Belgian film, directed by Mike van Diem.
- 1940 – De Korenharp
- 1940 – Drie toneelstukken (Three plays)
- 1941 – Apollyon
- 1946 – Eiken van Dodona (Oaks of Dodona)
- 1946 – Veuve Vesuvius
- 1947 – Bij gaslicht (By gaslight)
- 1947 – Vijf fantastische vertellingen (Five fantastic tales)
- 1948 – Noorderlicht
- 1948 – Plato's dood, symfonisch gedicht (Plato's death, symphonic poem)
- 1948 – Rotonde (opera)
- 1949 – Blokken, Knorrende beesten, Bint (Cubes, grunting animals, Bint), compilation
- 1949 – Het eiberschild
- 1949 – Nachtelijk paardengetrappel
- 1949 – Zwanenpolder; twintig verhalen
- 1950 – Vertellingen van generzijds (Tales from the other side)
- 1951 – De korenharp, nieuwe reeks
- 1951 – Studiën in volksstructuur
- 1952 – De doopvont
- 1954 – Haagse mijmeringen
- 1954 – Mevrouw en meneer Richebois; twintig korte verhalen (Misses and mister Richebois; twenty short stories)
- 1955 – Arenlezing uit De korenharp (compendium)
- 1955 – Bloesemtak
- 1955 – Onderweg naar Beacons; twaalf korte verhalen
- 1956 – Geachte confrère; splendeurs en misères van het beroep van advocaat
- 1956 – Halte Noordstad; vermeerderd met drie eenacters en een monoloog (play)
- 1956 – Tien verhalen (Ten stories)
- 1957 – Idem; tien parodieën (Idem; ten parodies)
- 1958 – De aktentas, tien korte verhalen
- 1959 – De zigeuners; twaalf korte verhalen en een schets (The gypsies; twelve short stories and a sketch)
- 1960 – Centrum van stilte; vijf verhalen (Centre of silence; five stories)
- 1961 – Tijding van ver (Faraway tidings)
- 1961 – Paddestoelen (raad in) rijm (under the pseudonym Ton Ven)
- 1964 – Lente; zeven verhalen (Spring, seven stories)
- 1964 – Jade, jaspis en de jitterbug (under the pseudonym Ton Ven)
- 1965 – De Golbertons
- 1981 – Dreverhaven en Katadreuffe
- 1982 – Zeven fantastische vertellingen; nagelaten feuilletons (Seven fantastic tales)
- 1982–1991 – Verzameld werk (Complete works, thirteen parts)
- 1983 – Vijf kleine verhalen (Five little stories)

== See also ==
- Ferdinand Bordewijk Prize
