= Wim Opbrouck =

Flemish actor and singer

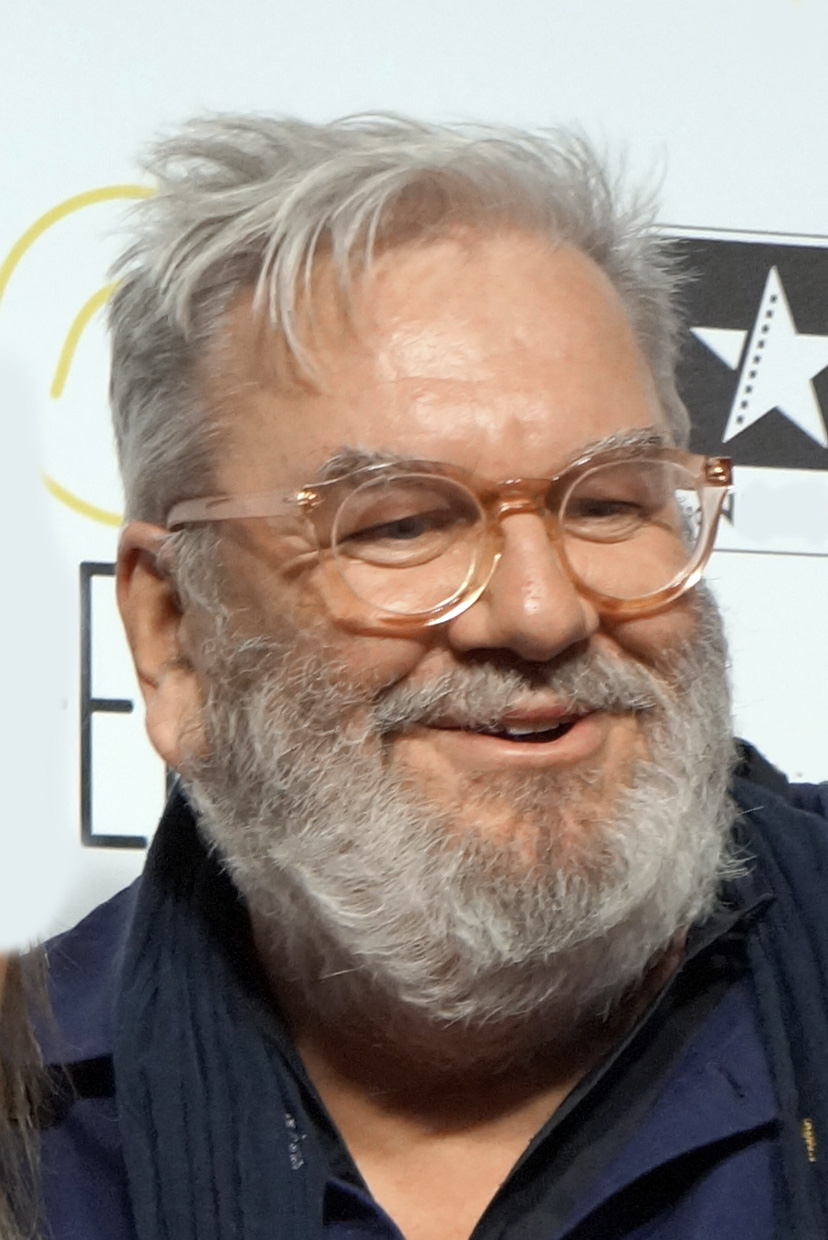
- Wim Opbrouck, 2019
- Born: Bavikhove, Belgium
- Occupations: actor, singer

Wim Opbrouck is a Flemish actor and singer from Belgium who is especially known for his work on stage.

== Early life and education ==
Wim Opbrouck comes from Bavikhove, part of Harelbeke and studied at the Herman Teirlinck Studio.

== Career ==
Opbrouck joined the Blue Monday Company. In 1997, he performed in a 12-hour theatre marathon production of Ten oorlog by Tom Lanoye. Following the merger of this company with KNS (Antwerp), he became an actor at the Drama House. He took on large roles in Aars! Leenane Trilogy, L. King of Pain, and Macbeth.

In 2005, he transferred to NTGent and acted with the company in Ghent.

In 2010, he succeeded Johan Simons as artistic director of NTGent.

== Other activities ==
He gained fame through his appearance in the travel documentary De Bende van Wim, a collaboration with composer and producer Jean Blaute and photographer Michiel Hendryckx, in which he travels through Europe on a motorcycle. He's also well known for appearing in the television shows Windkracht 10 and In De Gloria. He played in the films like Manneken Pis, Meisje, and Everybody's Famous!.

He also sings and plays accordion in the group The Dolfijntjes.

== Selected filmography ==
- Ad Fundum (1993) – Jean-Luc
- Manneken Pis (1995) – Desire
- Misstoestanden (2000) – Frank Verbert
- Everybody's Famous! (2000) – Rik De Visser
- Zoltan (2001) – Trainer
- Sea of Silence (2003) – Badmeester
- A Perfect Match (2007) – Julien
- Frits and Freddy (2010) – Carlo Mus
- Isabelle (2011) - Bernard
- Madonna's Pig (2011) – Mayor
- Salamander (2013)
- Love Revisited (2017)
- Cobain (2018)
- All of Us (2019)
- Annette (2021)
- Chantal (2022, 2024)) – Roland Schiettekatte
- Young Hearts - Uncle Tony
