= Hulste =

Village in West Flanders, Belgium

Coordinates: 50°53′N 3°18′E

Hulste is a village in the Belgian province of West Flanders. Hulste has 3456 inhabitants (2008) and an area of 7.86 km^{2}. It fused in 1977 to become part of the city of Harelbeke.
