= Character (novel) =

1938 novel by Ferdinand Bordewijk

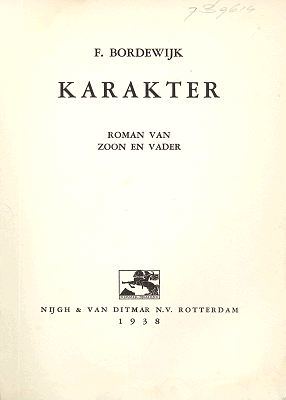
Title page of Karakter (1938 ed.)

Character (original Dutch title Karakter) is a novel by Dutch author Ferdinand Bordewijk published in 1938. Subtitled "Een roman van zoon en vader", "a novel of son and father", it is a Bildungsroman that traces the relationship between a stern father and his son. Character is Bordewijk's best-known novel, and the basis for a 1997 film of the same name.
