= Concorde Entertainment Group =

Defunct Benelux film distributor

- Type: Besloten vennootschap
- Industry: Film distribution
- Founded: 1972; 54 years ago
- Founders: Robbert Wijsmuller
- Defunct: 1998; 28 years ago
- Fate: Bankruptcy
- Area served: Benelux; Netherlands Antilles
- Products: Motion pictures

Concorde Entertainment Group, also known as Concorde Film, was a film distributor active in the Benelux and Netherlands Antilles. In 1998, it filed for bankruptcy following a conflict with Holland Media Groep and Miramax Films.

== History ==
In 1998, Holland Media Groep demanded that Concorde to pay a loan of 3.6 million guilders plus 700,000 in interest. When Concorde refused, HMG seized the company's assets. In turn, Miramax, which licensed 31 titles to Concorde, also demanded payment and canceled their license to distribute The English Patient, instead selling the film to RCV Entertainment.

In April, Miramax, along with several creditors filed a bankruptcy application against Concorde, on 12 May, the Hague court declared Concorde Entertainment Group bankrupt. In July, the bankruptcy was suspended for a month by the Court of Appeal in The Hague. In October however, the court rejected the appeal.

In May 1999, Concorde's assets, along with the rights of 150 film titles were acquired by Indies Film Distribution. On 4 September 2001, founder Robbert Wijsmuller died aged 61.

In 2006, Indies launched a DVD label under the label "Concorde Film Presents", named after the company.

== List of films ==
=== Dutch films ===
Release date	Title	Notes
1970s
23 February 1978	Doctor Vlimmen	
20 April 1978	Pastorale 1943	Produced by Spieghel Filmproductie
19 December 1979	Cha Cha	
1980s
26 February 1981	Charlotte	
31 August 1983	An Bloem	Produced by Frans Rasker Film
29 March 1984	Ciske de Rat	Produced by Sigma Film Productions
19 July 1984	Overvallers in de Dierentuin	Produced by Cine/Vista
27 February 1986	Abel	Produced by First Floor Features
18 September 1986	The Pointsman	Produced by Jos Stelling Filmproducties B.V.
17 December 1986	Flodder	Produced by First Floor Features
11 February 1988	Amsterdamned	Produced by First Floor Features
1989	Wilde Harten	
8 December 1989	Evenings	
1990s
16 February 1990	Han de Wit	
11 October 1991	Sebastian Star Bear: First Mission	
22 May 1992	For a Lost Soldier	
4 February 1993	False Light	
11 March 1993	The Little Blonde Death	
14 October 1993	Belle van Zuylen – Madame de Charrière	Produced by Studio Nieuwe Gronden and De Nieuwe Unie
14 October 1993	It Will Never Be Spring	
8 June 1995	Walhalla	
29 June 1995	Flodder 3	Produced by First Floor Features
15 November 1995	Long Live the Queen	Produced by First Floor Features
9 May 1996	Punk Lawyer	
14 November 1996	Wasted!	
29 January 1998	When the Light Comes	Produced by Favourite Films

=== Non-Dutch films ===
==== 1987 ====
- Act of Vengeance (04/06/87)
- Angelo My Love (21/05/87)
- Another Country (25/06/87)
- Black Moon Rising (21/05/87)
- Blue Velvet (02/07/87)
- Cal (27/08/87)
- Cat's Eye (05/02/87)
- Crimes of the Heart (29/10/87)
- Cross Country (20/08/87)
- The Decline of the American Empire (04/06/87)

==== 1988 ====
- Au revoir les enfants (07/04/88)
- The Bedroom Window (04/08/88)
- Careful, He Might Hear You (11/05/88)
- The Dead (25/02/88)
- Dirty Dancing (03/12/88)
- Evil Dead II (18/08/88)
- Flight of the Navigator (13/10/88)
- Hollywood Air Force (07/12/88)
- Jean de Florette (17/03/88)
- The Last Emperor (10/12/88)
- Man on Fire (23/06/88)
- Maurice (23/06/88)
- Orphans (13/10/88)
- The Running Man (11/05/88)
- SpaceCamp (21/07/88)
- Tai-Pan (20/10/88)

==== 1989 ====
- Camille Claudel (06/10/89)
- Cannonball Fever (10/08/89)
- The Clan of the Cave Bear (22/06/89)
- Cobra Verde (18/05/89)
- Edge of Insanity (18/05/89)
- Farewell to the King (08/06/89)
- From the Hip (01/02/89)
- Illegally Yours (20/07/89)

==== 1990 ====
- Air America (14/12/90)
- All Dogs Go to Heaven (06/07/90)
- Cyrano de Bergerac (01/06/90)
- Driving Miss Daisy (06/04/90)
- The First Power (05/10/90)

==== 1991 ====
- ¡Ay, Carmela! (09/06/91)
- A Rage in Harlem (09/06/91)
- City Slickers (30/08/91)
- The Doors (08/05/91)
- Eve of Destruction (06/12/91)
- Henry V (31/05/91)
- Jacob's Ladder (01/02/91)
- Misery (29/03/91)
- Teenage Mutant Ninja Turtles (08/02/91)
- Terminator 2: Judgment Day (27/09/91)

==== 1992 ====
- 1492: Conquest of Paradise (15/10/92)
- Les Amants du Pont-Neuf (31/01/92)
- Basic Instinct (08/05/92)
- My Mother's Castle (10/07/92)
- Christopher Columbus: The Discovery (03/09/92)
- Fried Green Tomatoes (28/08/92)
- My Father's Glory (05/06/92)

==== 1993 ====
- American Friends (29/07/93)
- Après l'amour (03/06/93)
- Army of Darkness (08/07/93)
- Bad Lieutenant (02/09/93)
- Farewell My Concubine (02/12/93)
- Until the End of the World (17/06/93)
- Black Robe (23/09/93)
- Chaplin (15/04/93)
- City of Joy (11/09/93)
- Clifhanger (24/06/93)
- La Crise (23/06/94)
- Get Back (15/07/93)
- Kafka (22/04/93)
- The Lawnmower Man (19/05/93)
- Malcom X (24/06/93)
- Orlando (28/01/93)
- Reservoir Dogs (05/08/93)
- A River Runs Through It (13/05/93)

==== 1994 ====
- Color of Night (29/09/94)
- Like Water for Chocolate (28/07/94)
- Germinal (03/02/94)
- The Getaway (07/07/94)
- Into the West (20/10/94)
- Pulp Fiction

==== 1995 ====
- All Men Are Mortal (30/11/95)
- Belle Époque (30/11/95)
- Der bewegte Mann (19/10/95)
- A Bronx Tale (03/08/95)
- Bullets Over Broadway (23/03/95)
- Heavenly Creatures (16/02/95)
- Malice (11/05/95)
- The Man Without a Face (09/03/95)
- Mediterraneo (17/08/95)
- Mother's Boys (16/02/95)
- Mrs. Parker and the Vicious Circle (13/07/95)
- Needful Things (06/04/95)
- Only the Strong (30/03/95)
- Le Parfum d'Yvonne (24/05/95)

==== 1996 ====
- Amos & Andrew (27/06/96)
- Beautiful Girls (15/08/96)
- Blue in the Face (22/02/96)
- The Crossing Guard (19/09/96)
- Cutthroat Island (15/05/96)
- Evita (19/12/96)
- Flirting with Disaster (31/10/96)
- From Dusk Till Dawn (04/07/96)
- French Twist (22/08/96)
- Guantanamera (08/08/96)
- Golden Balls (25/07/96)
- Josh and S.A.M. (09/05/96)
- Kids (01/02/96)
- Lie Down With Dogs (27/06/96)
- Mighty Aphrodite (30/05/96)
- Murder in the First (28/03/96)
- Rice People (07/03/96)
- Richard III (20/06/96)
- Rumble in the Bronx (25/07/96)
- Showgirls (15/02/96)
- Things to Do in Denver When You're Dead (09/05/96)
- Unzipped (25/04/96)
- La Vengeance d'une blonde (25/01/96)
- Waterland (05/09/96)

==== 1997 ====
- 2 Days in the Valley (17/07/97)
- Austin Powers: International Man of Mystery (09/10/97)
- Happiness Is in the Field (04/09/97)
- City of Industry (18/09/97)
- Crash (27/03/97)
- For Roseanna (06/11/97)
- Four Rooms (07/08/97)
- The Funeral (03/07/97)
- A Month by the Lake (31/07/97)
- Nelly and Mr. Arnaud (29/05/97)
- Restoration (12/06/97)
- Rude (04/09/97)
- Space Truckers (11/09/97)

==== 1998 ====
- The Tango Lesson (15/01/98)
