= Thom Hoffman =

Dutch actor and photographer

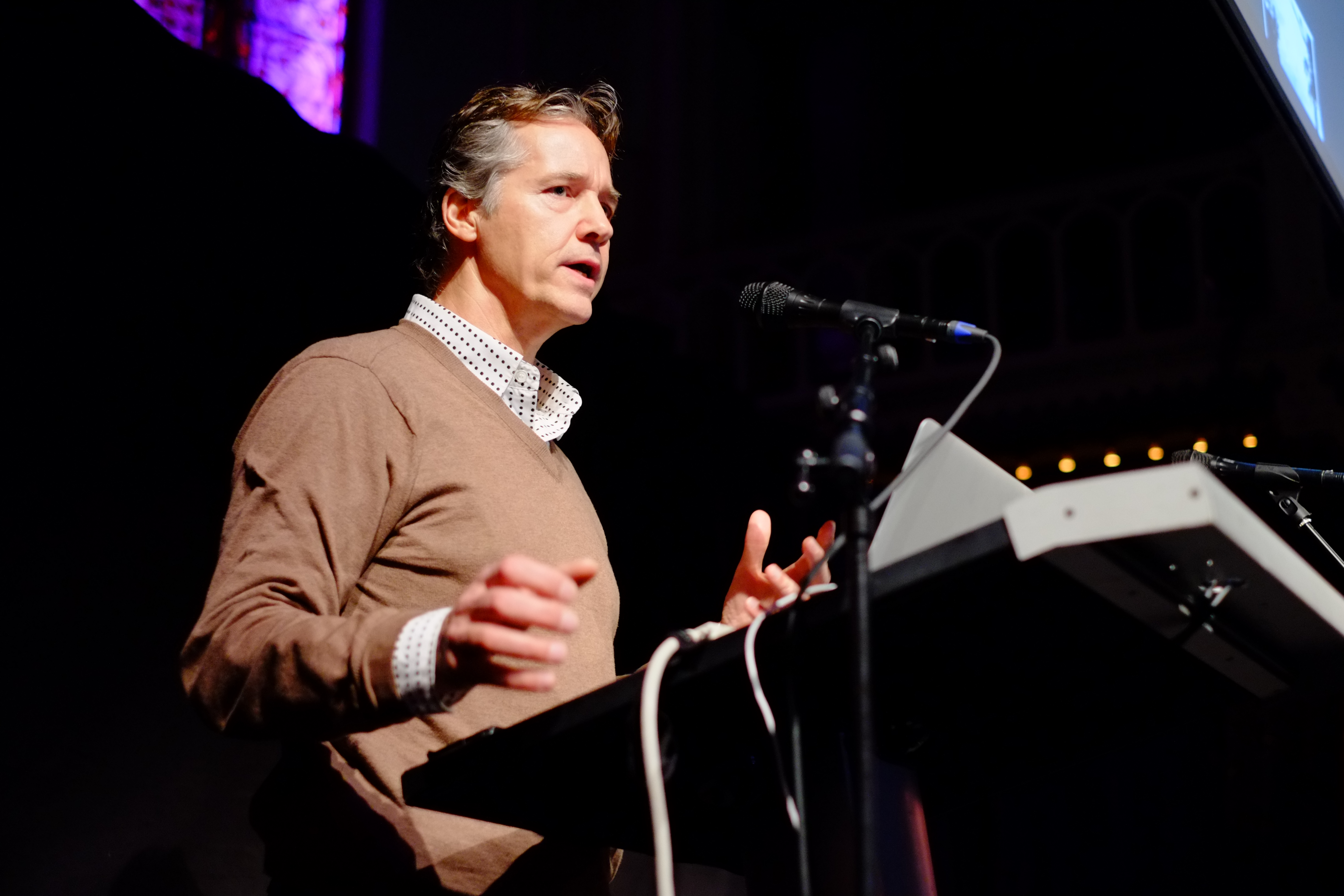
- Born: Thomas Antonius Cornelis Ancion; 3 March 1957 (age 69); Wassenaar, Netherlands
- Occupations: Photographer, actor
- Spouse: Giam Kwee (2005–present)

Thomas Antonius Cornelis Ancion (born 3 March 1957), known by the pseudonym Thom Hoffman, is a Dutch actor and photographer.

== Biography ==
Hoffman acts mainly in serious roles, especially those of complicated characters. His film debut was Luger under director Theo van Gogh in 1982 and since then has played more than twenty roles in films and TV series. He calls himself "more of a hard worker than a good actor"; he never studied formally to become an actor.

Since 1991 he has worked in photography, also without professional training.

Hoffman married actress Giam Kwee on 30 July 2005.

== Partial filmography ==
- 1981 Luger as Chris Luger
- 1982 Sprong naar de liefde as Freddy
- 1983 The Fourth Man as Herman
- 1984 De Witte Waan as Lazlo
- 1985 Tracks in the Snow as Ron
- 1986 Als in een Roes Diederik Van Avezaat
- 1986 45º parallelo as Tom
- 1986 The Washing Water as Gieljan Beijen
- 1987 Odyssée d'amour as Bart Buisman
- 1987 Looking for Eileen as Philip de Wit
- 1988 Shadowman as Fuchs
- 1989 Force majeure as Hans
- 1989 Rituals as Philip Taads
- 1989 De Kassière as Arend
- 1989 Evenings as Frits Van Egters
- 1990 Dilemma as Jef Mees
- 1991 Eline Vere as Vincent Vere
- 1991 De provincie as Frank
- 1991 The Diamond Brothers (TV series) as Eighty-six
- 1992 Orlando as King William of Orange
- 1992 De Bunker as Gerrit Kleinveld
- 1992 Rooksporen
- 1993 False Light as Wesley
- 1993 Hoffman's honger as Sonnema, Secretaris
- 1994 It Will Never Be Spring as Emile Lombardo
- 1996 The Cold Light of Day as Alexi Berka
- 1996 Naar de Klote! as D.J. Cowboy
- 1998 Sentimental Education
- 1998 Regrets
- 1999 Molokai: The Story of Father Damien as Dr. William Saxe
- 1999 Shabondama Elegy as Jack
- 1999 Under the Palms as Thomas
- 2000 De Omweg as Camille Kleber
- 2000 Le birdwatcher as Charles Williamsen
- 2000-2004 Russen (TV Series) as Paul de Vos
- 2001 Soul Assassin as Inspector Willem
- 2002 Bella Bettien as Frans Van Rijn
- 2002 Het Everzwijn (Short) as Jim
- 2003 Dogville as Gangster
- 2003 Klem in de Draaideur as Arthur Docters Van Leeuwen
- 2006 Black Book as Hans Akkermans
- 2009 Carmen van het noorden as Simon
- 2010 Kom niet aan mijn kinderen as Wouter Siemons
- 2010 Sintel (Short) as Shaman (voice)
- 2010 The Dinner Club as Simon Vogel
- 2012 De Overloper (TV Movie) as Mario Keizer
- 2012 Dokter Tinus as Martinus Elsenbosch (hoofdrol Dokter Tinus)
- 2013 La marque des anges - Miserere as Sean Singleton
