= Filmkrant =

Dutch film magazine

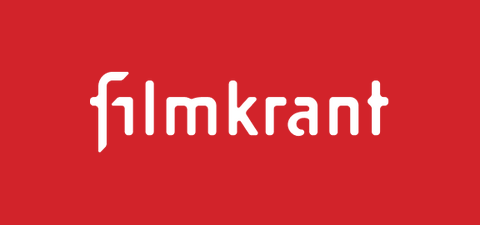
- Editor: Ronald Rovers
- Categories: Film
- Frequency: Monthly
- First issue: March 1981; 45 years ago
- Company: Stichting Fuurland
- Country: Netherlands
- Based in: Amsterdam
- Language: Dutch
- Website: filmkrant.nl
- ISSN: 0169-8109

Filmkrant is a Dutch free independent film magazine and website covering the film industry in the Netherlands. The magazine was founded in 1981 by Jan Heijs and Henk Rabbers. It is distributed for free and is available online and at movie theaters across the Netherlands. Since 2012, coinciding with the Netherlands Film Festival the Filmkrant releases a yearly top 20 list highlighting the most influential people and organizations in the Dutch film industry. Filmkrant remains the only film magazine in the Netherlands to be published regularly.

== History ==
The magazine was originally founded by Jan Heijs and designer Henk Rabbers in 1980 under the original name of Kriterion-Filmkrant, which was an offshoot of Filmtheater Kriterion, under the direction of Huub Bals. In its original incarnation it provided cinema listings for the Kriterion theatre in Amsterdam. In March 1981, they expanded to nationwide while the magazine remained free. In the summer of 1982, they began running into financial difficulties, Heijs realized that Film International was unable to fund the entire thing on its own. With Rabbers and Willem Oosterbeek, they began approaching other film houses asking if they would continue their agreement in exchange for a small fee. This funding proved enough and they would continue as an independent organization under Stichting Fuurland.

Under the name of Filmkrant, their focus would change to journalism including an expanded coverage of cinema releases, providing more background information on the industry, interviews and reviews with the first issue appearing in March. Stichting Fuurland was founded by Jan Heijs, Henk Rabbers and Willem Oosterbeek and still publishes the Filmkrant. Filmkrant circulated around 30.000 copies in 1984 and was one of the most important Dutch film periodicals in the eighties alongside Skoop and Skrien. Heijs remained the editor-in-chief until 1992, he was succeeded by Mark Duursma, who took over from issue #126 onwards. Heijs remained involved with the magazine.

Since 2012, coinciding with the Netherlands Film Festival the Filmkrant releases a yearly top 20 list highlighting the most influential people and organizations in the Dutch film industry, they took it over from the Volkskrant who discontinued the list in 2010 after starting it in 1999. Dana Linssen was the editor-in-chief over 20 years until she stepped down in 2019, she was succeeded by Ronald Rovers.

During the COVID-19 pandemic, the physical version was temporarily suspended while the website remained online.
