= Timeline of Maastricht =

The following is a timeline of the history of the municipality of Maastricht, Netherlands.

== Roman Period ==
- circa 10 BC - Construction of Roman main road from Cologne to the coast (Via Belgica).
- 1st half of 1st century AD - Maastricht Roman bridge built; gradual development of settlement on both sides of the river Meuse.
- ca. 150 - Construction of Roman baths and walled sanctuary (with a 9-meter sculpted Jupiter column).
- ca. 270 - Destruction of Roman Maastricht by invading Germanic tribes.
- 333 - Roman Castellum, Maastricht (fortress) built.
- 384 - Death of Saint Servatius in Maastricht (traditional); establishment of Roman Catholic Diocese of Maastricht (uncertain; this may have happened in the 6th c. only).

== Middle Ages ==
- ca. 570 - Bishop Monulph builds a large stone church on the grave of Saint Servatius.
- ca. 590-670 - At least twelve royal mint masters active in Maastricht.
- 595 - Childebert II in Maastricht.
- 667-670 - Childeric II in Maastricht.
- 690-695 - Clovis IV in Maastricht.
- ca. 700 - Murder of Lambert of Maastricht.
- 720 - Seat of the Maastricht diocese moved to Liège (traditional date; this may have happened later in the 8th/9th c.).
- late 8th/early 9th c. - Alcuin and Einhard (lay) abbots of Saint Servatius.
- 881 - Sack of Maastricht by Vikings.
- 1001 - Reburial of Charles, Duke of Lower Lorraine in the crypt of the church of Saint Servatius.
- 11th/12th c. - Chapter of Saint Servatius at its apogee; at least five successive provosts were chancellors of the Holy Roman Empire; collegiate churches of Saint Servatius and Our Lady renewed.
- 1204 - Siege of Maastricht (1204) by Hugues de Pierrepont, prince-bishop of Liège, and Louis II, Count of Loon; Maastricht condominium established between Liège and Brabant.
- 1229 - Duke of Brabant gives permission to replace the (partly?) earthen defence works by a stone city wall.
- 1230 - Order of St Mary Magdalene ("white nuns") establish monastery in Maastricht (until 1796).
- 1234 - Franciscans establish a monastery in Maastricht (throughout the ages around twenty Franciscan monasteries existed in Maastricht, including Third Order monasteries).
- ca. 1240 - Hospital Brothers of St. Anthony establish monastery ('commandry') in Maastricht (until 1783).
- ca. 1250 - Dominicans and Augustinians establish monasteries in Maastricht (until 1796).
- 1251 - First mention of Nieuwenhof beguinage, later turned into several monasteries of Third Order Franciscan nuns and friars.
- 1275 - Roman bridge collapses during a procession; many drowned.
- 1280-98 - Sint Servaasbrug (bridge) built.
- 1282 - Teutonic Order establish a commandry in Maastricht (until 1796).
- mid-14th century - second medieval city wall built, enlarging the city surface by 400%.
- 1376 - first mention of Saint Andrew Monastery, first a beguinage, later a monastery of Third Order Franciscan nuns.
- 1391 - First recorded instance of the seven-yearly Pilgrimage of the Relics.
- 1407/08 - Siege of Maastricht (1407/08) by Liège rebels.
- 1438 - Crosier Monastery, Maastricht established (until 1796)
- ca. 1470 - Dinghuis courthouse built.
- 1476 - De Beyart established, monastery of Third Order Franciscan nuns.

== 16th–18th century ==
- 1535 - Fifteen anabaptists burned in Vrijthof.
- 1551 - Jacob Bathen starts printing and publishing business.
- 1566 - Beeldenstorm in Maastricht; several churches looted by fanatic Protestants.
- 1570 - Jesuits establish a monastery and a college (1575).
- 1576 - Sack of Maastricht by Spanish troops and German mercenaries.
- 1579 - Siege of Maastricht (1579) by Spanish forces, followed by three-day sack; all Protestants killed or expelled.
- 1632 - Capture of Maastricht by Dutch forces; equal rights for Protestants and Catholics; several churches ceded to Protestants.
- 1638 - Maastricht Treason: 22 traitors accused of helping the Spanish in recapturing the city; nine are executed.
- 1662 - Municipal library founded.
- 1673 - Siege of Maastricht (1673) by French forces.
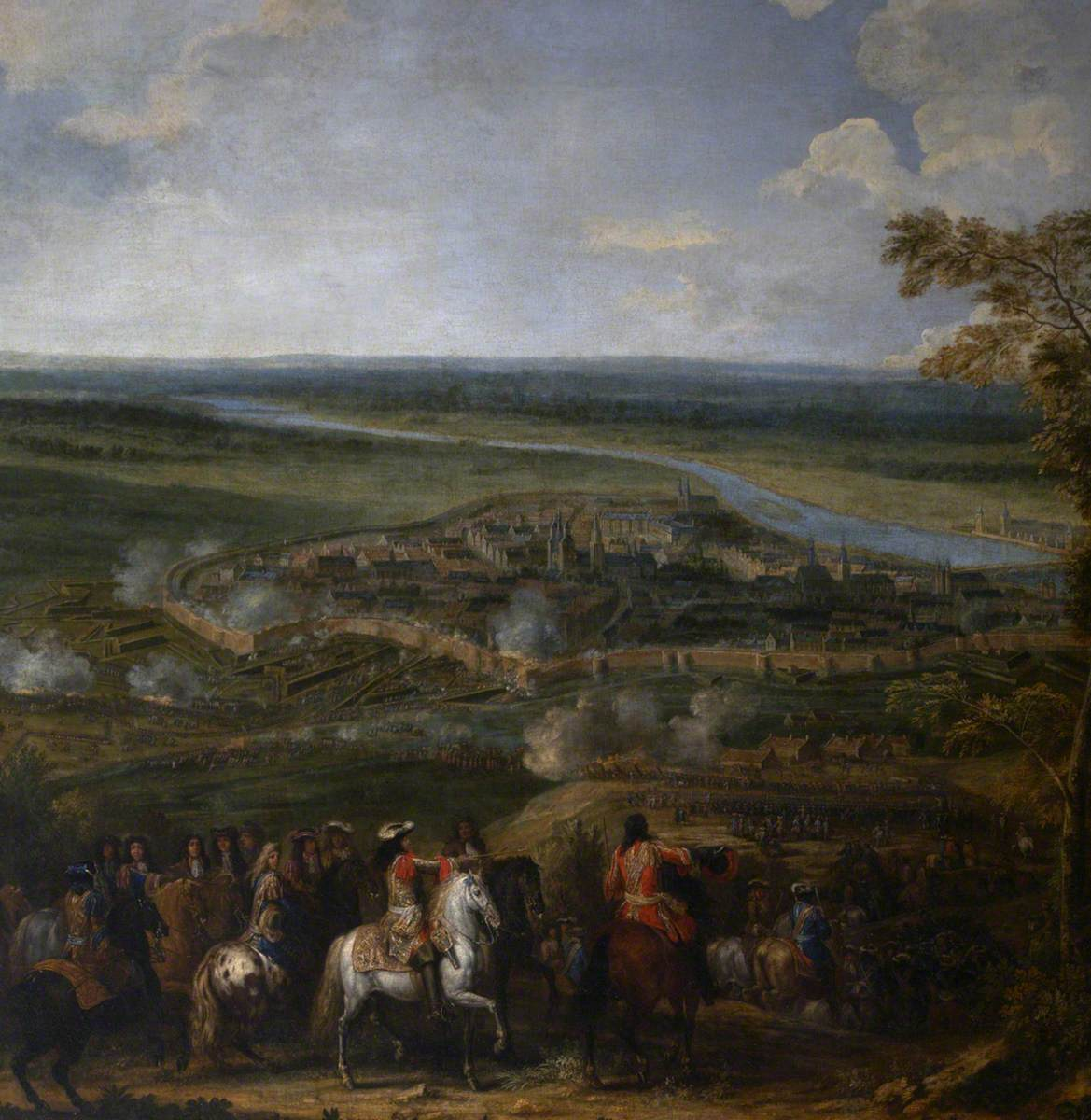
  Louis XIV and his officers observing the Siege of Maastricht, 1673
- 1678 - Peace of Nijmegen: French vacate the city; Dutch in power.
- 1683 - Maastricht City Hall completed, designed by Pieter Post. Sint Servaasbrug (bridge) partly re-built.
- 1748 - Siege of Maastricht (1748) by French forces; occupation lasted only a few months. Large scale model of the city and its fortifications built by the French (now in the Palais des Beaux-Arts de Lille).
- 1789 - Bonbonnière theatre opens.
- 1793 - Siege of Maastricht (1793) by French forces (failed).
- 1794 - Siege of Maastricht (1794).
- 1795 - Maastricht becomes capital of the French Meuse-Inférieure département as part of the French First Republic, later First French Empire (until 1814).
- 1796 - Suppression of the monasteries and religious chapters in Maastricht; parish churches remain open if priests take the Oath of Hatred, which many refuse. Many art treasures, libraries and archives destroyed or looted.

== 19th century ==
- 1805 - Generaalshuis (now a theater) built in Vrijthof.
- 1811 - General Cemetery Tongerseweg established (including Jewish Cemetery, Maastricht).
- 1815 - Maastricht becomes capital of the Province of Limburg, as part of the United Kingdom of the Netherlands.
- 1822 - Société des Amis des Sciences, Lettres et Arts founded (precursor of Limburg Historical and Antiquarian Society; see 1929).
- 1824 - Population: 20,271.
- 1826 - Zuid-Willemsvaart (canal), including Bassin, Maastricht (port) opened.
- 1834 - Petrus Regout manufacturer of glass and pottery in business.
- 1837 - Maastricht City Park in use.
- 1838 - Saint Nicholas Church, Maastricht demolished.
- 1840 - Maastricht Synagogue built.
- 1850 - Liège-Maastricht Canal dug, parallel to Meuse. Many buildings on the riverside demolished, including Antonite Church, Maastricht
- 1851 - Le Courrier de la Meuse French-language newspaper begins publication.
- 1853 - Aachen-Maastricht Railway Company begins operating.
- 1859 - Saint Martin's Church, Maastricht rebuilt.
- 1861 - Liège–Maastricht railway begins operating.
- 1863 - Société Céramique manufactory in business.
- 1865 - Maastricht–Venlo railway begins operating.
- 1866 - Population: 28,495.
- 1867 - Maastricht taken off list of fortified cities. Medieval city wall and ring of outer fortifications largely dismantled between 1867 and circa 1920.
- 1877 - Population: 29,083.
- 1881 - Limburg State Archives headquartered in former First Minorite Church, Maastricht.
- 1884 - Bonnefantenmuseum established (as a museum of archaeology and local history).
- 1886 - Courrier du Limbourg newspaper begins publication.

== 20th century ==
- 1902 - MVV Maastricht football club formed.
- 1904 - Population: 36,146.
- 1912 - Maastricht Natural History Museum founded.
- 1915 - Maastricht railway station opens (current station; it had several predecessors).
- 1916 - Saint Lambert Church built in Neo-Byzantine style.
- 1919 - Population: 41,305.
- 1920 - Annexation of Sint Pieter and Oud-Vroenhoven, as well as parts of Borgharen, Meerssen, Amby, Heer and Gronsveld. The area of the municipality of Maastricht increases from 4.15 km^{2} to 35 km^{2}. Its population increases to 54,268.
- 1926 - Eerste Nederlandse Cement Industrie factory begins operating; large section of Mount Saint Peter becomes limestone quarry.
- 1929 - Limburg Historical and Antiquarian Society established.
- 1932 - Wilhelmina Bridge built.
- 1935 - Juliana Canal opened.

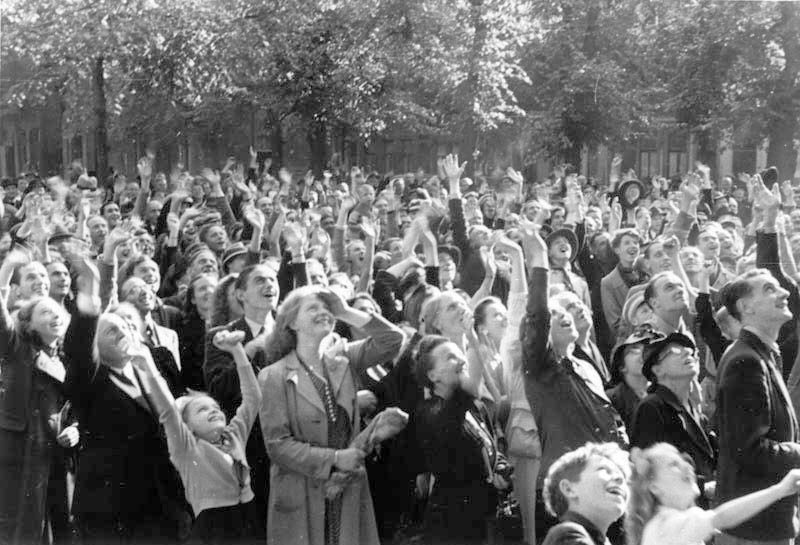
Liberation of Maastricht on 14 September 1944

- 1940, 10 May - Battle of Maastricht; German occupation begins.
- 1942 - Most of Maastricht's more than 500 Jews deported and killed in German concentration and extermination camps.
- 1944, 13/14 September - Liberation of Maastricht: US troops of 30th Infantry Division ("Old Hickory") liberate the city.
- 1944/45 - Maastricht serves as 'rest center' for allied forces. Maastricht Aachen Airport begins operating.
- 1944, 7 December - Maastricht Meeting. Allied commanders Omar Bradley, Arthur Tedder, Dwight Eisenhower, Bernard Montgomery and William Hood Simpson meet in Maastricht to discuss further strategy.
- 1948 - Jan Van Eyck Academie established.
- 1950 - Maastricht Academy of Dramatic Arts established.
- 1959 - Maastricht Institute of Arts active.
- 1960 - Population: 90,202.
- 1961 - De Geusselt stadium built.
- 1962 - Maastricht Academy of Music established.
- 1968 - John F. Kennedy Bridge, Maastricht opens.
- 1970 - Annexation of Borgharen, Itteren, Amby and Heer, as well as parts of Meerssen, Bemelen and Gronsveld. The area of the municipality of Maastricht increases from 35 km^{2} to 59 km^{2} and its population from 93,500 to 112,500.
- 1973 - Museum aan het Vrijthof established.
- 1975 - The European Fine Art Fair (TEFAF) starts as Pictura Fine Art Fair in Eurohal Exhibition Centre.
- 1976 - Maastricht University opens.
- 1981 - First European Council in Maastricht.
- 1987 - Maastricht Randwyck railway station and Lumiere Cinema open.
- 1988 - TEFAF moves to MECC Maastricht; Museumkelder Derlon (Roman excavation site) opens.
- 1990 - Population: 117,008.
- 1991 - Academic Hospital Maastricht opens. 9/10 December: Second European Council in Maastricht.
- 1992 - 7 February: Maastricht Treaty signed in city; Theater aan het Vrijthof opens.
- 1995 - Bonnefantenmuseum moves to new building by Aldo Rossi in Céramique district.
- 1999 - Centre Céramique (library and arts centre) opens.

== 21st century ==
- 2002 - Gerd Leers becomes mayor; Mestreechs Volksleed officially adopted as the city's anthem.
- 2003 - Hoge Brug (pedestrian bridge) opens.
- 2005 - Limburg History Centre (HCL) created through merger of national and city archives.
- 2006 - Entre Deux shopping mall rebuilt; Bookshop in adjacent Dominican Church, Maastricht.
- 2010 - Onno Hoes becomes first openly gay mayor of Maastricht.
- 2013 - Maastricht Noord railway station opens.
- 2014 - Population: 121,906 municipality; 182,721 metro.
- 2015 - Annemarie Penn-te Strake becomes first female mayor of Maastricht.
- 2016 - Koning Willem-Alexandertunnel officially opened.

== See also ==
- Maastricht history
- History of Maastricht
- List of mayors of Maastricht
- List of rijksmonuments in Maastricht
- Other names of Maastricht
- Timelines of other municipalities in the Netherlands: Amsterdam, Breda, Delft, Eindhoven, Groningen, Haarlem, The Hague, 's-Hertogenbosch, Leiden, Nijmegen, Rotterdam, Utrecht

== Bibliography ==
=== in English ===
published in the 18th-19th century

- Thomas Nugent (1749), "Maestricht", The Grand Tour, vol. 1: Netherlands, London: S. Birt, hdl:2027/mdp.39015030762598
- Abraham Rees (1819), "Maestricht, a town in France", The Cyclopaedia, London: Longman, Hurst, Rees, Orme & Brown, hdl:2027/mdp.39015057241120
- "Maestricht". Galignani's Traveller's Guide through Holland and Belgium (4th ed.). Paris: A. and W. Galignani. 1822. hdl:2027/njp.32101073846667.
- William Henry Overall, ed. (1870). "Maestricht". Dictionary of Chronology. London: William Tegg. hdl:2027/uc2.ark:/13960/t9m32q949.
- "Maestricht", Handbook for Travellers in Holland and Belgium (20th ed.), London: John Murray, 1881, hdl:2027/hvd.hn2ha2

published in the 20th century

- "Maestricht". Chambers's Encyclopaedia. London. 1901. hdl:2027/uc2.ark:/13960/t7zk5ms79.
- "Maastricht", Belgium and Holland (15th ed.), Leipzig: Karl Baedeker, 1910, hdl:2027/uc1.b3129294
- "Maastricht" . Encyclopædia Britannica. Vol. 17 (11th ed.). 1910. p. 188.
- Benjamin Vincent (1910), "Maestricht", Haydn's Dictionary of Dates (25th ed.), London: Ward, Lock & Co., hdl:2027/loc.ark:/13960/t89g6g776

published in the 21st century

- Colum Hourihane, ed. (2012). "Maastricht". Grove Encyclopedia of Medieval Art and Architecture. Oxford University Press. ISBN 978-0-19-539536-5.

=== in other languages ===
- Philippe Vandermaelen (1835). "Maestricht". Dictionnaire géographique du Limbourg. Dictionnaires géographiques de la Belgique.4. Anvers (in French). Établissement géographique de Bruxelles. hdl:2027/mdp.39015049024923.
- Abraham Jacob van der Aa (1846). "Maastricht". Aardrijkskundig woordenboek der Nederlanden [Geographical dictionary of the Netherlands] (in Dutch). Vol. 7. Gorinchem: Jacobus Noorduyn. hdl:2027/mdp.39015039364008 – via HathiTrust.
- Auguste Jean Flament, ed. (1888). Catalogus der Stadsbibliotheek van Maastricht (in Dutch). Maastricht: J. Germain & cie.
- Henri Zondervan [in Dutch], ed. (1919), "Maastricht", Winkler Prins' Geillustreerde Encyclopaedie (in Dutch), vol. 11 (4th ed.), Amsterdam: Uitgevers-Maatschappy „Elsevier“, hdl:2027/mdp.39015068347957
- G. van Herwijnen, ed. (1978). "Limburg: Maastricht". Bibliografie van de stedengeschiedenis van Nederland [Bibliography of Urban History in the Netherlands] (in Dutch). Brill. ISBN 90-04-05700-5.
- Marina Kessels-van der Heijde (2002). Maastricht, Maestricht, Mestreech: de taalverhoudingen tussen Nederlands, Frans en Maastrichts in de negentiende eeuw (in Dutch). Hilversum: Uitgeverij Verloren. ISBN 90-6550-713-2.
- P. Ubachs & I. Evers (2005). Historische encyclopedie Maastricht (in Dutch). Zutphen: Walburg Pers. ISBN 90-5730-399-X.
- Caspar Cillekens & Wim Dijkman (2006). 20 eeuwen Maastricht (in Dutch). Nijmegen: BnM.
- P. Ubachs & I. Evers (2006). Tweeduizend jaar Maastricht: een stadsgeschiedenis (in Dutch). Zutphen: Walburg Pers. ISBN 90-5730-441-4.
