= Isa Hoes =

Dutch actress

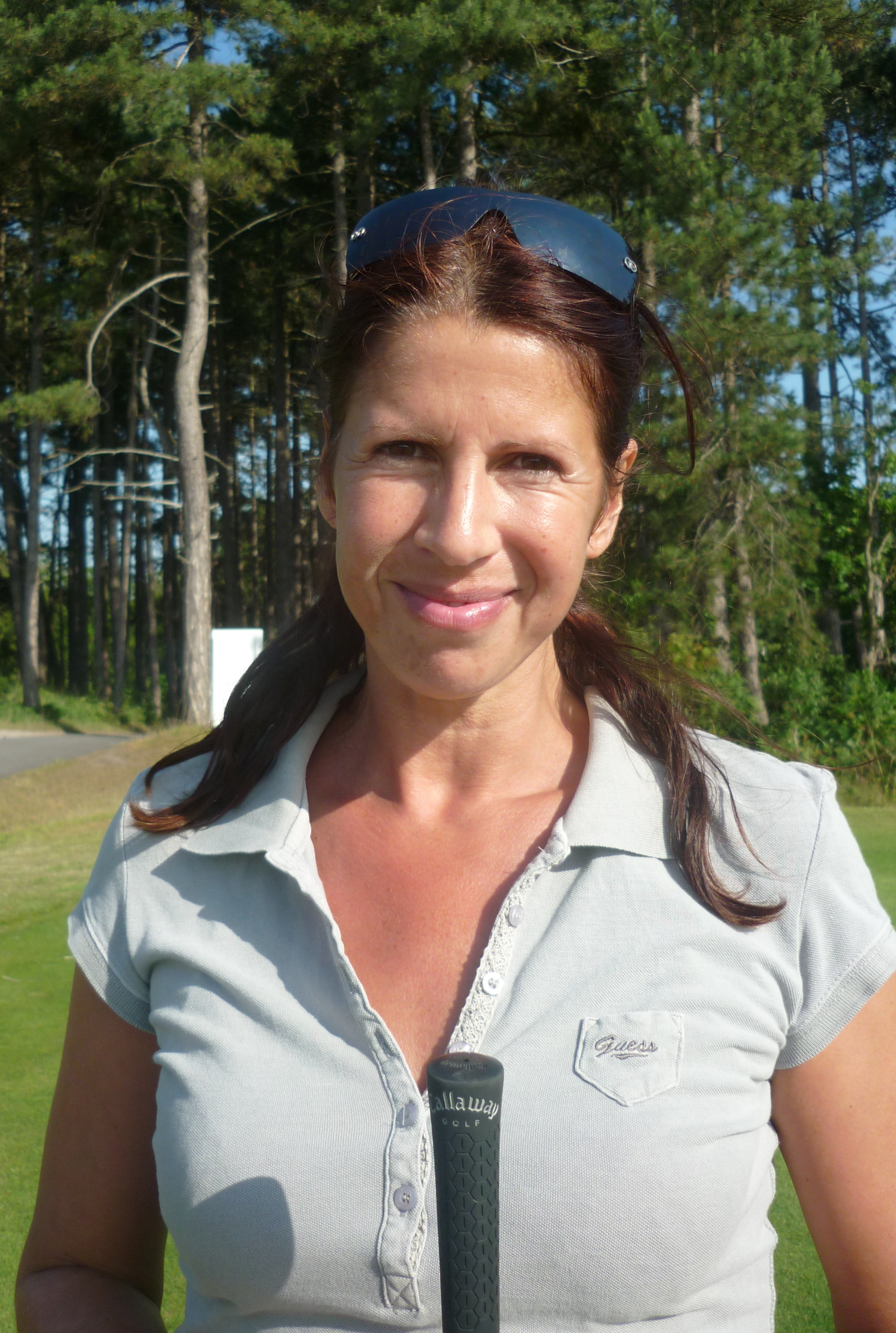
- Born: 13 June 1967 (age 58); Leiden, Netherlands
- Occupation: Actress
- Years active: 1990-present
- Spouse: Antonie Kamerling (m. 1997; died 2010)
- Children: 2
- Relatives: Onno Hoes (brother)

Isa Hoes (Dutch pronunciation: [ˈisaː ˈɦus]; born 13 June 1967) is a Dutch actress. She is best known for her role as Myriam van der Pol in the ongoing Dutch soap opera Goede tijden, slechte tijden.

== Biography ==
Isa Hoes was born on 13 June 1967 in Leiden in the Netherlands. She is also the younger sister of Onno Hoes, who was the mayor of Maastricht as of 1 November 2010 till 30 June 2015. Hoes graduated from the Toneelacademie Maastricht (Academy of Dramatic Arts).

She frequently dubs characters in anime, cartoons, and movies. Recently, she became the voice of Heather from Total Drama in the Dutch version of the series.

=== Personal life ===
Isa Hoes was married to the actor Antonie Kamerling. Hoes and Kamerling met on set of the soap opera Goede tijden, slechte tijden. The couple later got married on 26 June 1997 in Venice, Italy. The couple had two children named Merlijn and Vlinder. On 6 October 2010, Kamerling ended his life. The film Toen ik je zag is based on their relationship and the events and circumstances leading up to Kamerling's suicide.

== Filmography ==
=== Films ===
- Rebecca in Darkling
- Roos in All Stars
- Mother in Five Fingers
- Jeanine in M.A.N.
- Tanja in Alibi
- Wendy Parker in Bonding

=== Television ===
- Myriam van der Pol in Goede tijden, slechte tijden (1990–1993,1994)
- Liesbeth Vrijman in Vrouwenvleugel
- Catharina Donkersloot in Rozengeur & Wodka Lime
- Isabel Zwagers in Medisch Centrum West
- Beatrix Hoogendoorn in Seth & Fiona
- Agent Ineke Slats in Coverstory
- Lydia in Windkracht 10
- Paulien in 12 steden, 13 ongelukken
- Suzanne Kramer Celblok H (Dutch remake of Wentworth)

== Voice-dubbing roles ==
=== Animation ===
- Erika Kawaye, Katrina Villard, Jennifer Rial, Paige DeLisle, Elizabeth Strong, Tara Hendrikse, Marÿke Li and Kirsten Daily in FairlyOdd Xiaolin Crystal
- Heather in Total Drama
- Jez in Jimmy Two-Shoes
- Wendy Darling in Return to Never Land
- Cedric Errol in Little Lord Fauntleroy
- Erika (Gym Leader)/Katrina (EP069)/Jeanette Fisher in Pokémon
- Princess Atta in A Bug's Life
- Erika Kawaye, Katrina Villard, Jennifer Rial, Paige DeLisle, Elizabeth Strong, Tara Hendrikse, Marÿke Li and Kirsten Daily in Demashita! FairlyOdd Xiaolin Z
- Elastigirl/Helen Parr The Incredibles
- Abby Mallard in Chicken Little
- Nakoma in Pocahontas
- Snork Maiden in Moomin
- Erika Kawaye, Katrina Villard, Jennifer Rial, Paige DeLisle, Elizabeth Strong, Tara Hendrikse, Marÿke Li and Kirsten Daily in FairlyOdd Xiaolin

=== Live action ===
- Betty Lou Who in How the Grinch Stole Christmas
- Jackie Framm in Air Bud: Golden Receiver
