= The Little Blonde Death =

- Theatrical release poster
- Directed by: Jean van de Velde
- Written by: Rob Houwer
- Based on: De kleine blonde, dood by Boudewijn Büch
- Produced by: Rob Houwer
- Starring: Antonie Kamerling; Loes Wouterson; Olivier Tuinier
- Cinematography: Jules van den Steenhoven
- Edited by: Victorine Habets
- Music by: Jurre Haanstra
- Distributed by: Concorde Film
- Release date: 11 March 1993
- Running time: 95 minutes
- Country: Netherlands
- Language: Dutch
- Box office: $2.18 million (Netherlands)

The Little Blonde, Dead (Dutch: De kleine blonde, dood) is a 1993 Dutch film directed by Jean van de Velde. It was based on a book of Boudewijn Büch. The film was selected as the Dutch entry for the Best Foreign Language Film at the 66th Academy Awards, but was not accepted as a nominee. It also won the Golden Calf by Best Feature Film.

== Plot ==
Reckless poet Valentijn suddenly becomes a single father after an unexpected pregnancy.

== Cast ==
- Antonie Kamerling as Valentijn Boecke
  - Yoran Hensel as Jonge Valentijn
- Olivier Tuinier as Mickey
- Loes Wouterson as Mieke
- Gees Linnebank as Vader Boecke
- Liz Snoyink as Moeder Boecke
- Reinout Bussemaker as Harold
- Ellen Ten Damme as Dede
- Porgy Franssen as Arts Ziekenhuis
- Helen Kamperveen as Lucy de Jong
- Willemijn van der Ree as Verpleegster
- Ingeborg Elzevier as Gynaecoloog
- Pamela Teves as Juffrouw van Dalen
- Johan Ooms as Uitgever
- Gerard van Lennep as Uitgever

== Reception ==
The film was the highest-grossing Dutch film of the year with a gross of $2.18 million.

== See also ==
- List of submissions to the 66th Academy Awards for Best Foreign Language Film
- List of Dutch submissions for the Academy Award for Best Foreign Language Film
