= For a Lost Soldier =

- Theatrical release poster
- Dutch: Voor een Verloren Soldaat
- Directed by: Roeland Kerbosch
- Screenplay by: Don Bloch; Roeland Kerbosch
- Based on: Rudi van Dantzig
- Produced by: Guurtje Buddenberg; Matthijs van Heijningen
- Starring: Maarten Smit; Jeroen Krabbé; Andrew Kelley; Freark Smink; Elsje de Wijn
- Cinematography: Nils Post
- Edited by: August Verschueren
- Music by: Joop Stokkermans
- Production companies: Sigma Film Productions; AVRO
- Distributed by: Concorde Film
- Release date: 22 May 1992 (Netherlands)
- Running time: 92 minutes
- Country: Netherlands
- Languages: Dutch; West Frisian; English

For a Lost Soldier (Dutch: Voor een Verloren Soldaat) is a 1992 Dutch coming-of-age romantic drama film directed by Roeland Kerbosch, based on the autobiographical novel of the same title by ballet dancer and choreographer Rudi van Dantzig. It is centered around an adult Canadian soldier (Andrew Kelley) who meets a young Dutch kid (Maarten Smit) in rural 1945 Holland. They experience a romantic and sexual relationship during the liberation of the Netherlands from Nazi occupation.

== Plot ==
In the 1980s, middle-aged ballet dancer and choreographer Jeroen feels dissatisfied with his dancers' interpretation of an autobiographical ballet about Canada's liberation of the Netherlands in 1945. In his office, he shows his colleague Laura a photo of himself as a 12-year-old with his foster family during WWII. A document and vintage sunglasses on his desk reveal he is searching for a Canadian soldier named Walt. Jeroen decides to visit the village where he lived with his foster family, bringing the sunglasses and engaging in mental “conversations” with his teenage self. During the first, the story shifts to 1944.

At 11, Jeroen is sent to a foster family in the countryside to escape hunger. Despite a mix-up—they wanted a girl—they treat him kindly. On his first night, he wets the bed while sharing it with Henk, his foster parents' slightly older son, and begins to realize he is gay. When a Canadian warplane crashes near the village beach, Jeroen becomes fascinated. He and his bisexual friend Jan try to explore the wreck but fail.

When Canadian liberators arrive, Jeroen meets Walt, a soldier, and they begin flirting. At a party, they secretly dance, and Jeroen is smitten. Later, they meet again, and Jeroen accompanies Walt to the soldiers' hotel. They join others at the beach, but when the group leaves, Jeroen shows Walt the crashed plane. They return to the hotel to retrieve a jeep, but Walt's comrades have disabled it. Walt sneaks inside to fix it and showers before rejoining Jeroen, who waits outside. Jeroen enters Walt's room, and they have sex.

The next Sunday, Jeroen confidently fends off another assault attempt by Jan. He and Walt meet at a church service, explore the plane wreck, and Walt gives Jeroen a driving lesson. While Walt sleeps after they have sex again, Jeroen takes one of his photos and hides it in his shirt. Later, Walt waits in Jeroen's foster family's garden to take a photo. Disappointed Walt cannot be in it, Jeroen uses a scarecrow as his “double” by placing Walt's identification tag around its neck. Walt's comrades arrive and suggest a group photo with Jeroen's foster family. While developing the photos, Jeroen ruins the negative. He comforts Walt, promising they will always be together, unaware Walt is leaving the next day. That night, Walt tries to ask Jeroen's foster father, Hait, to explain his departure, but Hait does not understand.

The next day, Jeroen overhears his older foster sister discussing the soldiers' departure. Devastated, he pushes his younger foster sister off her bike and searches for Walt. Returning home, he sees his older foster sister hanging laundry, including the shirt with Walt's ruined photo. Heartbroken, Jeroen is woken by a storm and mistakes the scarecrow for wearing Walt's tag. Running outside, he impales his hand on barbed wire. Hait finds him and burns the scarecrow the next morning, discovering Walt's forgotten sunglasses. Later, Jeroen receives a letter from his mother, not Walt, and breaks down by the sea. When his mother comes to take Jeroen back home, Hait comforts him and secretly places Walt's camera films in Jeroen's suitcase, giving the sunglasses to Jeroen's mother to pass on later. As they leave, Hait asks Jeroen to send him a photo of them together. Jeroen recalls his teenage heartbreak and mentally tells his younger self that he does not remember Hait's words, but his teenage self admits he heard them and chose to forget.

Back in the 1980s, a content Jeroen encourages his dancers during their final rehearsal. As he watches them perform, Laura hands him an envelope containing an enlarged photo of himself and his foster family. Beneath it is a zoomed image of Walt's identification tag, revealing his contact information.

== Cast ==
- Maarten Smit as Jeroen Boman (child)
- Jeroen Krabbé as Jeroen Boman (adult)
- Andrew Kelley as Walter Cook
- Freark Smink as Hait
- Elsje de Wijn as Mem
- Derk-Jan Kroon as Jan
- Wiendelt Hooijer as Henk
- Iris Misset as Bonden
- Gineke de Jager as Elly
- Tatum Dagelet as Gertie
- Marie-José Kouwenhoven as Renske
- Valerie Valentine as Laura
- William Sutton as Chuck
- Andrew Butling as Buikspreker
- Andrew Cassani as Winslow

== Reception ==
Despite its controversial themes, Kerbosch said that the film was broadly accepted. "In Holland, audiences just took it as a love story," he said. "And that's also what happened in New York, because it's a love story, a beautiful and romantic one at that."

Psychologist Richard Gartner, cofounder of MaleSurvivor, the national organization against male sexual victimization, says in his journal article "Cinematic Depictions of Boyhood Sexual Victimization":

Like the many coming-of-age films involving boys and older women discussed above, For a Lost Soldier emphasizes the erotic component of the intimacy between the boy and man, as well as the boy's eagerness for the relationship. The nostalgic, romantic mood of Summer of '42 is evident in this movie as well, and in many ways For a Lost Soldier gives the same message to gay boys that Summer of ‘42 gives to heterosexual boys, namely, that he is very lucky to 'come of age' via sexuality with an adult, in this case a man. Yet For a Lost Soldier gives a complex message about Jeroen's "sexual initiation." Though understated, there is more obvious ambivalence here than in Summer of '42 about sexual behavior with the adult object of the boy's adoring desire. There are hints that Jeroen, while lonely and longing for an eroticized relationship with Walt, is mainly looking for an intense bond to a man with whom he can identify and on whom he can depend, rather than for an explicit adult sexual relationship. Walt's warmth and interest in him would be a heady experience for any lonely boy. Yet, at several points Jeroen diverts Walt from overt sexuality; and the look of fear and pain on his face before and during anal intercourse belies the otherwise ecstatic feeling of the scene. His sexual betrayal by Walt is twofold: his implicitly eroticized hero worship is turned into unambiguous adult sexuality, and subsequently Walt's promise of interpersonal intimacy is broken by a heedless and callous desertion. The enigmatic ending suggests that Jeroen has had troubled intimate relationships ever since being seduced and abandoned as a 12-year-old by a man he adored.

Stephen Holden of The New York Times praised the film's "refusal to load the story with contemporary psychological and social baggage" but wrote that the film was unable to achieve a "coherent dramatic frame". He added that the film does not insinuate Walt had harmed or abused Jeroen, and also that within the work "is no mention of homosexuality."

Kevin Thomas of the Los Angeles Times wrote that due to a lack of clarity over the homosexual themes, the film "delves into issues far too serious and controversial for such questions to go unanswered." He also stated that the confusion over language, as the film is partially in English and partially in Dutch, may have caused it to "lack crucial clarity," despite good acting.

While Desmond Ryan of The Philadelphia Inquirer called the film "an acutely observed portrait of adolescent yearning", he criticized the film's opaque ending, saying, "What was evenhanded becomes simply open-ended."
