= Antonie Kamerling =

Dutch actor (1966–2010)

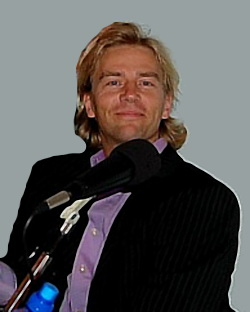
- Kamerling in 2007
- Born: Anthonie Willem Constantijn Gneomar Kamerling; 25 August 1966; Arnhem, Gelderland, Netherlands
- Died: 6 October 2010 (aged 44); Zevenhoven, South Holland, Netherlands
- Occupations: Actor, singer
- Years active: 1989–2010
- Spouse: Isa Hoes (m. 1997)
- Children: 2

Anthonie Willem Constantijn Gneomar "Antonie" Kamerling (Dutch pronunciation: [ˈɑntoːni ˈkaːmərlɪŋ]; 25 August 1966 in Arnhem – 6 October 2010 in Zevenhoven) was a Dutch actor and singer. He was member of the original cast of the Dutch soap opera Goede tijden, slechte tijden. He played in the films The Little Blonde Death (1993), All Stars (1997), and I Love You Too (2001). He also had starring roles in Dutch musical productions. He has become the voice of Geoff from Total Drama in the Dutch version of the series. He took his own life in 2010.

== Early life ==
Anthonie Willem Constantijn Gneomar Kamerling was born on 25 August 1966 in Arnhem in the Netherlands.

== Career ==
Kamerling was still a law student when in 1990 he was cast in the then new Dutch soap opera Goede tijden, slechte tijden. His character, Peter Kelder, quickly became one of the most popular on the program.

In 1993, he got the lead in The Little Blonde Death, directed by Jean van de Velde. At the time, his casting was quite controversial, as soap actors were considered to be inferior to "professional" actors. Kamerling eventually got nominated for a Gouden Kalf for best actor, the most important Dutch film award.

In 1997, he starred in another film by Van de Velde, All Stars. For the film, about an amateur football team, he sang the theme song, "Toen ik je zag" (When I Saw You), written by the popular Dutch singer Guus Meeuwis. The song was released as a single under his character's name, Hero, and soon was a number-one hit on the Dutch charts. From that moment on, Kamerling tried to get a music career, but could never repeat the success of his first single.

After that point, Kamerling played in a couple more films, the most successful being I Love You Too (2001), and in television series such as All Stars – De Serie and Onderweg naar Morgen. Later in his career, he played in a couple of musicals, including starring roles in the musical versions of Turkish Delight and Sunset Boulevard.

== Personal life ==
Antonie Kamerling was married to actress Isa Hoes. They met on the set of Goede tijden, slechte tijden. They had two children together, son Merlijn and daughter Vlinder. The film Toen ik je zag is based on their relationship and the events and circumstances leading up to Kamerling's suicide. His sister Liesbeth is also an actress. Kamerling was a distant relative of the Ghanaian-born British actor Hugh Quarshie.

Kamerling was praised for his charity work with development organization Edukans, helping their efforts to provide basic education to underprivileged children in developing countries.

== Death ==
Kamerling ended his life on 6 October 2010. He was buried at Zorgvlied in Amsterdam on Tuesday 12 October 2010. He was 44 years old.

== Filmography ==
Year	Title	Role	Notes
1993	The Little Blonde Death	Valentijn Boecke	
1994	En route	Hans Kelderman	TV movie
1994	Suite 16	Chris	
1994	Respect	Kristoff	TV movie
1995	KOEKOEK!	Dirk	Short
1995	Darkling	Paul	Short
1996	Lisa	Sam	
1996	Predestined Things	Brother of Henry	Short
1997	All Stars	Hero	
1997	Hot Dogs	Marc	Short
1998	Left Luggage	Peter	
1998	Het 14e kippetje	Daniel Ackerman	
1998	Sentimental Education		
2000	The Runner	The Runner	
2001	I Love You Too	Eric	
2001	Saint Amour	Louis (young)	TV movie
2001	Soul Assassin	Karl Jorgensen Jr.	
2004	Love Trap	Thijs	
2004	Mindhunters	Man in the Bar	
2004	Exorcist: The Beginning	Lieutenant Kessel	
2005	Dominion: Prequel to the Exorcist	Kessel	
2006	Wicked	Policeman	
2006	Horizonica	Sam Russo	
2009	Prima Primavera	Holland férfi	
2009	Budapest	Kaspar	
2009	The Blue Horse	Trevor	
2010	New Kids Turbo	Peter Kelder	
2008	Nefarious	Eric	
