= Beezy =

Beezy may refer to:

- African-American slang for a woman
- Beezy (album), 2023 mixtape by Doe Boy
- Beezy Bailey, South African artist
- Beezy J. Heinous, fictional character in Jimmy Two-Shoes

== See also ==
- Beezy Bear, 1955 Disney animated short film
- Yella Beezy, American rapper
