= Amby =

Amby or AMBY may refer to:

- Amby, Maastricht, a neighbourhood in Maastricht, the Netherlands
- Amby, Queensland, a town in Australia
- A diminutive of Ambrose (given name)
- AMBY, a blog and YouTube channel hosted by Alicia Atout
- A nickname for the Hindustan Ambassador
