= De grens =

1984 film

- Directed by: Leon de Winter
- Written by: Leon de Winter
- Starring: Johan Leysen
- Release date: 20 September 1984
- Running time: 100 minutes
- Country: Netherlands
- Language: Dutch

De grens (English:The border) is a 1984 Dutch thriller film directed by Leon de Winter. It was screened in the Un Certain Regard section at the 1984 Cannes Film Festival.

== Cast ==
- Johan Leysen - Hans Deitz
- Linda van Dyck - Marleen Ruyter
- Angela Winkler - Rosa Clement
- André Dussollier - Marcel Boas
- Héctor Alterio - Andras Menzo
- Mariana Rey Monteiro - Sabino's mother
- Cecília Guimarães - Pensionhoudster
- Paula Guedes - Ondervraagster
- Isabel Ribeiro - Marcel's wife
- José María Blanco
- Rui Cardoso
- Rosa Clement
- Hans Deitz
- Helena Isabel
