= Jean van de Velde =

Jean Van de Velde may refer to:

- Jean van de Velde (director) (born 1957), Dutch film director and screenwriter
- Jean van de Velde (golfer) (born 1966), French professional golfer
