= Gerd Leers =

Dutch politician

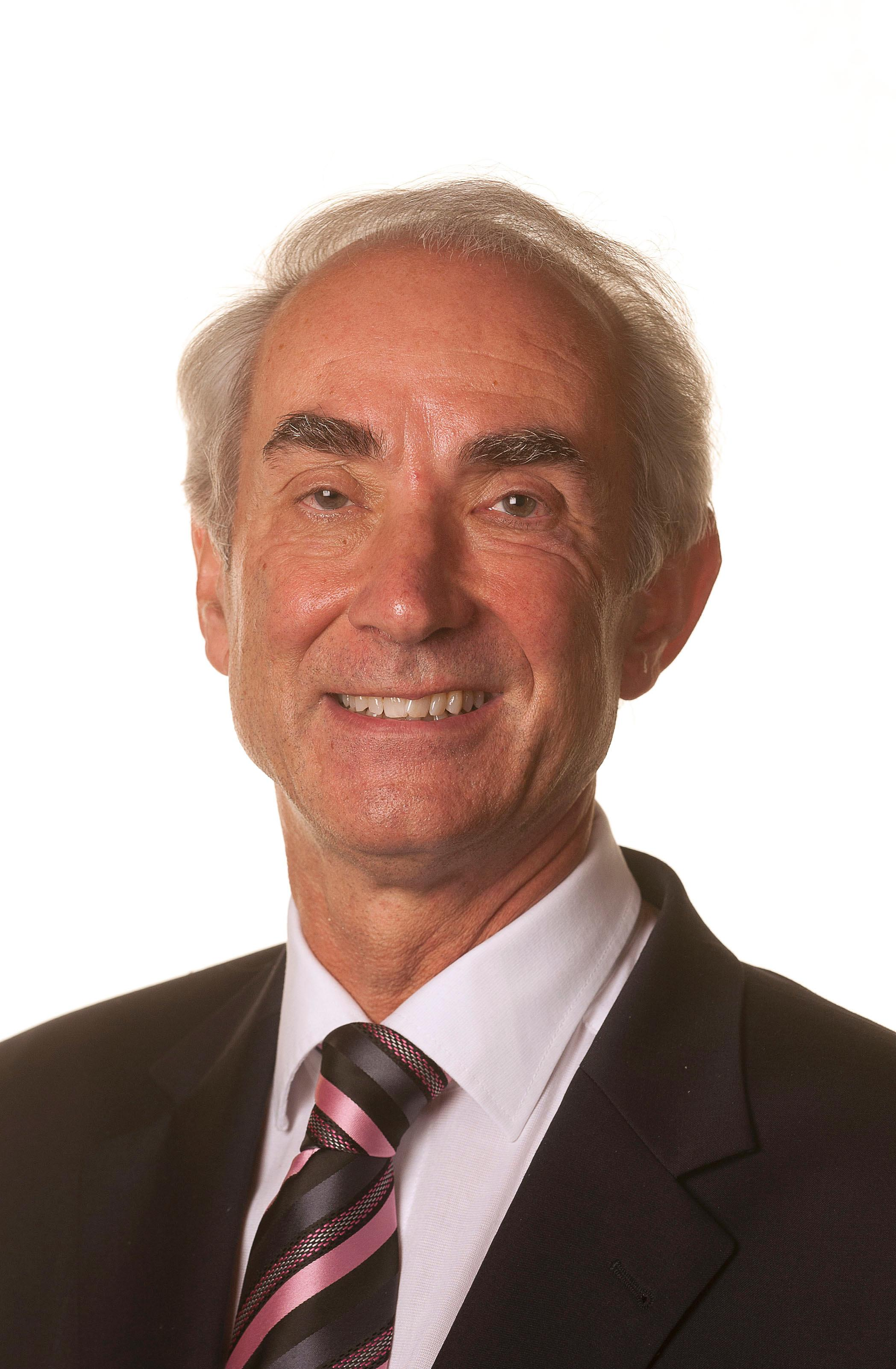
- Leers in 2010

Mayor of Brunssum (interim)
- In office 1 January 2018 – 11 March 2020
- Preceded by: Luc Winants
- Succeeded by: Wilma van der Rijt

Minister for Immigration and Asylum Affairs
- In office 14 October 2010 – 5 November 2012
- Prime Minister: Mark Rutte
- Preceded by: Office established
- Succeeded by: Office discontinued

Mayor of Maastricht
- In office 1 February 2002 – 1 March 2010
- Preceded by: Philip Houben
- Succeeded by: Jan Mans (ad interim)

Member of the House of Representatives
- In office 4 September 1990 – 1 February 2002

Personal details
- Born: Gerardus Bernardus Maria Leers; 12 July 1951 (age 75) Kerkrade, Netherlands
- Party: Christian Democratic Appeal (from 1980)
- Other political affiliations: Catholic People's Party (1976–1980); Labour Party (1975–1976)
- Spouse: Genoveef Poelmans (m. 1977)
- Children: 3 children
- Education: Radboud University Nijmegen (Bachelor of Architecture, Bachelor of Economics, Master of Economics)
- Occupation: Politician · Civil servant · Accountant · Researcher · Management consultant

Gerardus Bernardus Maria "Gerd" Leers (born 12 July 1951) is a Dutch politician of the Christian Democratic Appeal (CDA) party. He has served in a number of posts in local government, the House of Representatives and the Cabinet.

== Biography ==
=== Politics ===
On 4 September 1990 Leers became a Member of the House of Representatives. He was a member of the permanent parliamentary commission for transport and water management. The political peak in his House of Representatives period was the Betuwe route, of which Leers was a strong proponent. However, he was also involved in a construction fraud scandal.

Leers became Mayor of Maastricht on 1 February 2002 after Karl Dittrich withdrew his candidacy. Here, he took strict measures, such as the raid on the travellers camp Vinkenslag and stopping the subsidy to the football club MVV. He was also a proponent for amnesty for declined asylum seekers. In late 2004 Leers was chosen as best mayor of the Netherlands. This choice came after a conflict with the civil service, after heavy criticism from Leers.

While mayor, he also gained attention for his view on the policy on soft drugs. He criticised the tolerance policy that permitted consumption and sale of marihuana and hashish, but prohibited its cultivation. Leers argued for legal production under government supervision, intended to improve quality and therefore public health. Leers also proposed the construction of a "weed boulevard" on the south side of Maastricht, so that drugs tourists would no longer cause trouble in the city centre. However, this proposal was rejected.

In 2008, he failed to become mayor of The Hague and Rotterdam.

In January 2010, he resigned as mayor of Maastricht after an affair concerning a holiday villa project in Byala, Bulgaria. It was alleged that he was involved in shady deals to raise the value of villas he owned.

From October 2010 to November 2012 he served as the Minister for Immigration and Asylum Affairs in the first Rutte cabinet.

He was the acting Mayor of Brunssum from January 2018 to March 2020.

== Decorations ==
Honours
Ribbon bar	Honour	Country	Date	Comment
	Officer of the Order of Orange-Nassau	Netherlands	7 December 2012	Elevated from Knight (2002)

Political offices
Preceded by Philip Houben	Mayor of Maastricht; 2002–2010	Succeeded by Jan Mans; Ad interim
New office	Minister for Immigration and Asylum Affairs; 2010–2012	Office discontinued
Preceded by Luc Winants	Mayor of Brunssum; Ad interim 2018–present	Incumbent
