= List of mayors of Maastricht =

This is a list of mayors of the city of Maastricht, capital of the province of Limburg, Netherlands.

Period	Name of Mayor	Party	Notes
1800 - 1801	Emanuel Joseph Lefebvre		
1801 - 1808	Pierre Etiene Monachon		
1808 - 1815	Christiaan Coenegracht		
1815 - 1818	Jhr. André Charles Membrède		
1818 - 1835	Jhr. Godart van Slijpe		
1835 - 1850	Hendrik Nierstrasz		
1851 - 1855	Jacques Pascal Wijnandts		
1855 - 1860	Hieronymus van Aken		
1861 - 1867	Willem Hubert Pijls		
1867 - 1873	Hendrik Raat		
1873 - 1900	Willem Hubert Pijls		
1900 - 1910	Petrus Bauduin		
1910 - 1937	Leopold van Oppen		
1937 - 1941	Willem Michiels van Kessenich	KVP	
1941 - 1943	Louis Peeters	NSB	
1944 - 1967	Willem Michiels van Kessenich	KVP	
1967 - 1985	Fons Baeten	KVP / CDA	
1985 - 2002	Philip Houben	CDA	
2002 - 2010	Gerd Leers	CDA	
2010 - 2010	Jan Mans	PvdA	acting mayor
2010 - 2015	Onno Hoes	VVD	
2015 -	Annemarie Penn-te Strake	independent	

== See also ==
- Timeline of Maastricht

== Bibliography ==
- Mayors of Maastricht since 1800
