= Digna Sinke =

Dutch film director, producer and screenwriter

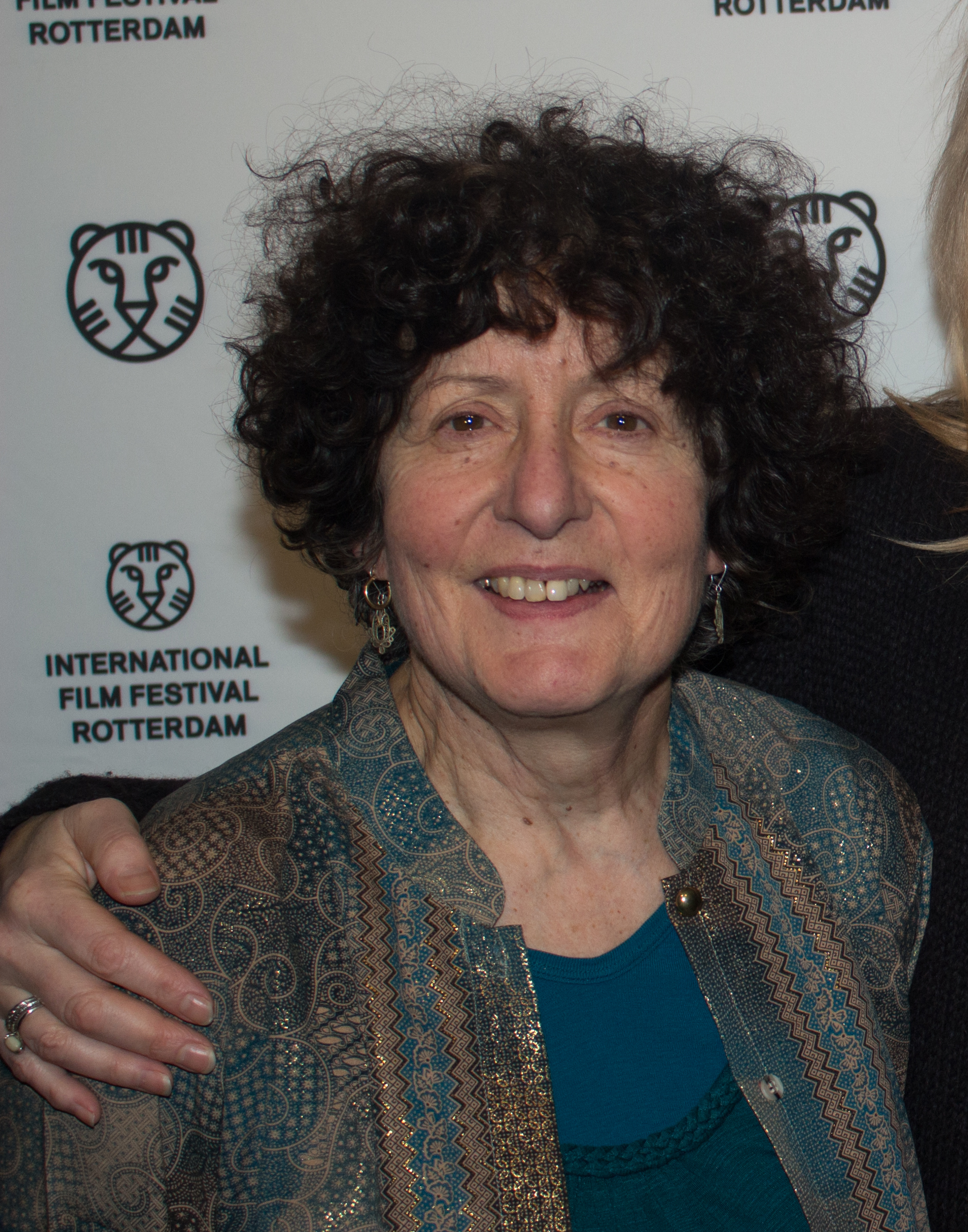
- Digna Sinke at the International Film Festival 2015
- Born: 17 October 1949 (age 76); Zonnemaire, Netherlands
- Occupations: Film director Screenwriter; Film producer
- Years active: 1972-present

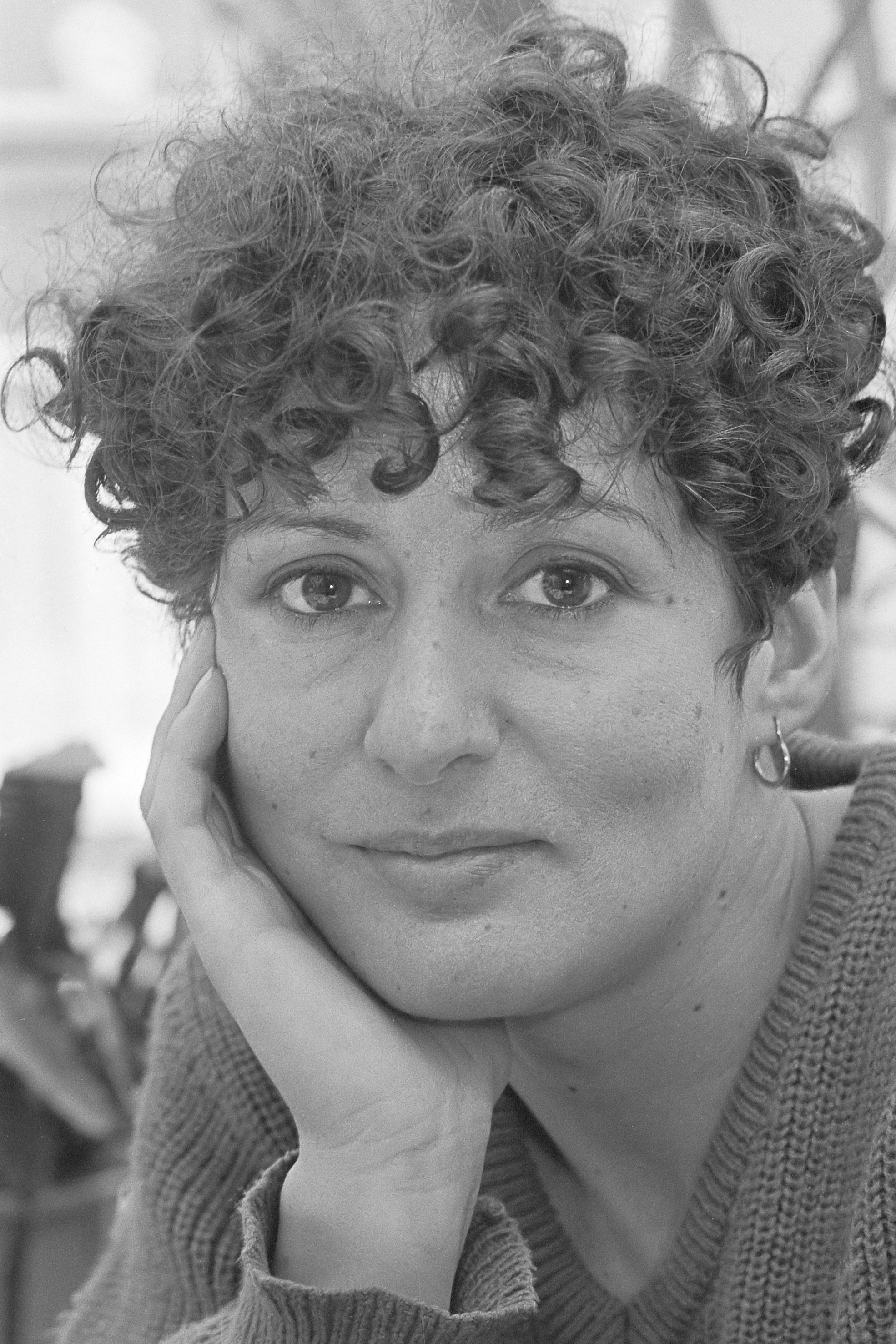
Digna Sinke (1984)

Digna Sinke (born 17 October 1949) is a Dutch film director, producer and screenwriter. She has directed 13 films since 1972. Her 1984 film De stille Oceaan was entered into the 34th Berlin International Film Festival.

== Selected filmography ==
- De stille Oceaan (1984)
- Above the Mountains (1992)
- Belle van Zuylen – Madame de Charrière (1993)
