= Belle van Zuylen – Madame de Charrière =

Belle van Zuylen - Madame de Charrière
- Theatrical release poster
- Directed by: Digna Sinke
- Written by: Digna Sinke
- Produced by: René Scholten; René Goossens
- Starring: Will van Kralingen; Laus Steenbeeke; Kees Hulst; Patty Pontier; Carla Hardy
- Cinematography: Goert Giltaij
- Edited by: Menno Boerema
- Music by: Belle van Zuylen; Corelli; Scarlatti; Händel; Cimarosa
- Production companies: Studio Nieuwe Gronden; De Nieuwe Unie
- Distributed by: Concorde Film
- Release date: 16 September 1993
- Running time: 112 minutes
- Country: Netherlands
- Language: Dutch
- Budget: ƒ 900.000

Belle van Zuylen – Madame de Charrière is a 1993 Dutch historical film, directed by Digna Sinke.

A biography of Isabelle de Charrière and her friendship with Benjamin Constant.

This film got the Main Award of the 43rd International Filmfestival Mannheim-Heidelberg in 1994.

== Cast ==
- Will van Kralingen ... Belle van Zuylen
- Laus Steenbeke ... Benjamin Constant
- Kees Hulst ... Charles Emanuelle de Charrière
- Patty Pontier ... Henriette de Monachon
- Carla Hardy ... Germaine de Stael
- Marieke van Leeuwen... Charlotte (actually sister-in-law Henriette de Charrière)
- Joke van Leeuwen ... Louise de Charrière
- Krijn ter Braak ... Jean Baptiste Suard
- Kitty Courbois ... Mrs. Saurin
- Gijs Scholten van Aschat...Mr Saurin
- Carol van Herwijnen... Benjamin Constant's father
- Truus te Selle ... Augustine-Magdaleine Pourrat
- Arthur Boni ... Vicar Henri-David de Chaillet
- Ed Bauer ... Pierre Alexandre DuPeyrou
- Mirjam de Rooij ... Girl in carriage
- Miryanna Boom ...
- Eric Corton
