= Johan Leysen =

Belgian actor (1950–2023)

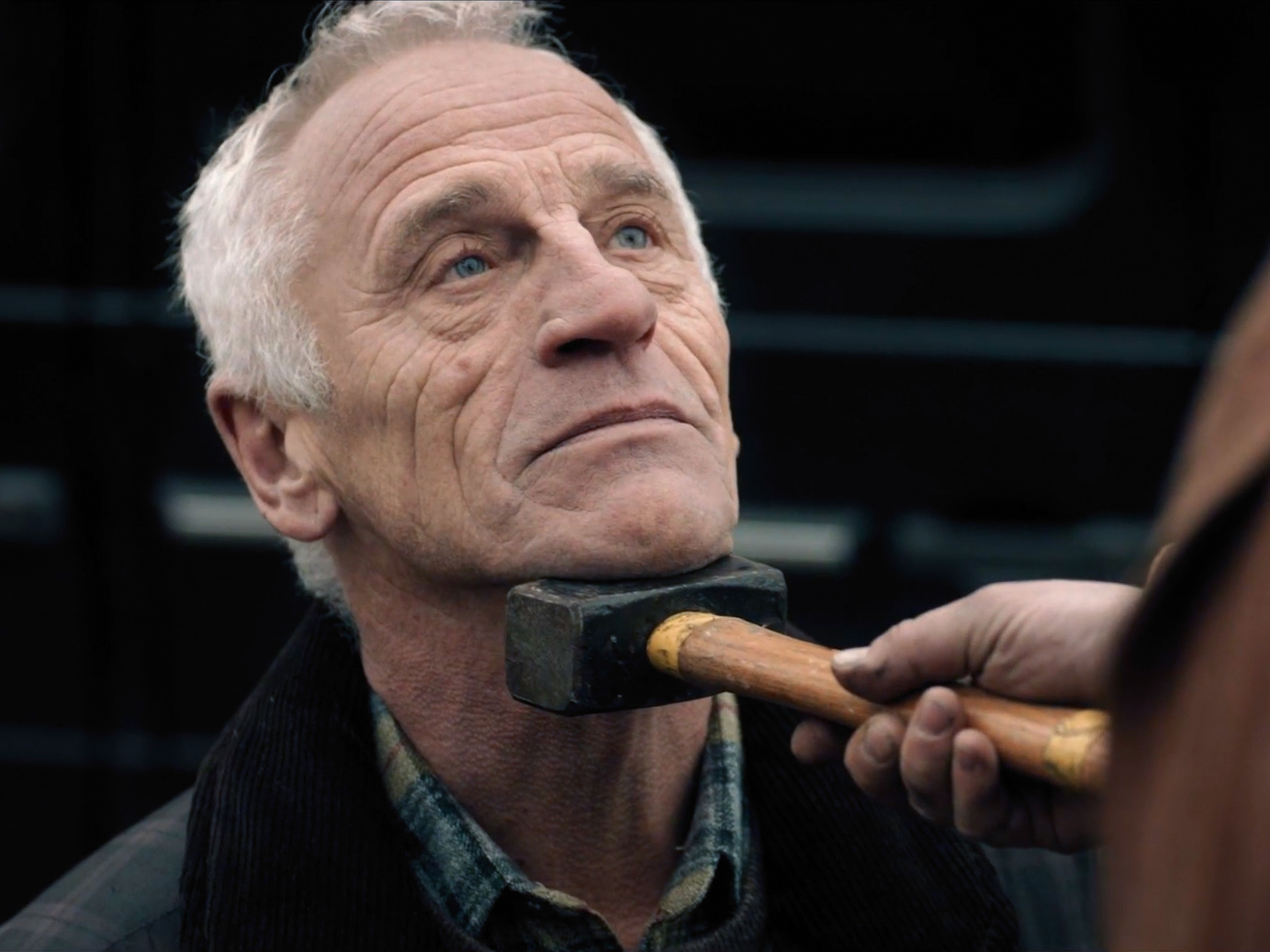
- Leysen in Son of Mine (2015)
- Born: 19 February 1950; Hasselt, Limburg, Belgium
- Died: 30 March 2023 (aged 73)
- Occupation: Actor
- Years active: 1977–2023
- Spouse: Rita Horst (divorced)
- Children: 1

Johan Leysen (19 February 1950 – 30 March 2023) was a Belgian actor. He appeared in more than 130 films and television shows from 1977. He starred in the film De grens, which was screened in the Un Certain Regard section at the 1984 Cannes Film Festival. In 1998, he won the Golden Calf for Best Actor for his role in the movie Felice...Felice.... In the 2010 film The American, he appeared as Pavel, mysterious handler of Jack, the assassin character played by George Clooney.

== Filmography ==
Year	Title	Role	Notes
1977	Rubens	Rubens	
1981	The Girl with the Red Hair	Frans	
1982	Le Lit	Dr. Bruno Nanteuil	
1984	De grens	Hans Deitz	
1984	De stille Oceaan	Jan Verstraete	
1984	Broken Mirrors (Gebroken spiegels)	The Boss	
1985	Hail Mary		
1987	Macbeth	Banco	
1988	The Music Teacher	François Manssaux	
1988	The Abyss	Rombaut	
1990	Alissa in Concert	Ziekenbroeder	
1990	Romeo	Matthijs	
1991	Eline Vere	Henk van Raat	
1991	Revelations of an Insomniac	Visitor	
1992	Daens	Schmitt	
1992	Above the Mountains	Vincent	
1992	Traces of Smoke		
1996	A Saturday on Earth	Franck	
1996	True Blue	Daniel Topolski	
1996	Tykho Moon	Anikst	
1997	De Langste Reis	Mertens	
1998	Felice...Felice...	Felice Beato	
1998	The Commissioner	Horst Kramer	
1999	Mates	Officier Blaak	
2000	Le Roi danse	Robert Cambert	
2000	Faites comme si je n'étais pas là	René	
2001	Brotherhood of the Wolf	Antoine de Beauterne	
2001	Savage Souls	Rampal	
2002	Tattoo	Frank Schoubya	
2002	The Afghan	Father	
2003	Grimm		
2003	Gun-Shy	Romberg	
2005	Someone Else's Happiness	Francis	
2010	The American	Pavel	
2011	The Silence of Joan	Commander of the Guard	
2013	The Verdict	Jan de Cock	
2013	Young & Beautiful	Georges Ferriere	
2014	The Missing	Karl Sieg	Season 1
2014	Cadences obstinées		
2014	2/11, Het spel van de wolf		
2015	The Brand New Testament	Martine's husband	
2015	The Assistant	Éric Lemans	
2015	Despite the Night	Vitali	
2015	Son of Mine	Vester	
2016	Souvenir	Tony	
2017	Above the Law	Jean Lemoine	
2019	A Hidden Life	Ohlendorf	
2023	Time Out	Bonnard's father	
