= Het 14e kippetje =

1998 film

- Theatrical release poster
- Directed by: Hany Abu-Assad
- Written by: Hany Abu-Assad; Paul Ruven
- Produced by: Marc Bary; Ilana Netiv
- Starring: Antonie Kamerling; Thekla Reuten; Dirk Zeelenberg
- Cinematography: Mies Rogmans
- Edited by: Rinze Schuurman
- Music by: Fons Merkies
- Production company: Ijswater Films
- Distributed by: United International Pictures
- Release date: 1 October 1998
- Running time: 88 minutes
- Country: Netherlands
- Language: Dutch

Het 14e kippetje is a 1998 Dutch film directed by Hany Abu-Assad, the script was written by Arnon Grunberg. The leading roles were filled by Antonie Kamerling, Thekla Reuten and Dirk Zeelenberg.

Het 14e kippetje was the opening movie at 1998's Nederlands Film Festival in Utrecht and was not a success in cinemas. 29,631 people went to see the movie.

== Plot ==
The movie is about a young couple who are going to marry. Daniel Ackerman (Antonie Kamerling) and Francesca Moorman (Thekla Reuten) are already late for the party at the start of the movie so they have to call a taxi. They do not know where the agreed restaurant is so they go find someone who knows it.

Meanwhile at the restaurant old friends come back together, Martin Teitel (Dirk Zeelenberg), Harold Cammer (Peter Paul Muller), Philip Berman (Kasper van Kooten) and Alfred Fener (Michael Pas) muse about their memories.

After a while the parents of Francesca (Peer Mascini and Cecile Heuer) and the mother of Daniel (Elsje de Wijn) arrive at the restaurant and a big mess is created when Harold and Mr Moorman start an eating competition.

Around the end of the film Daniel and Francesca successfully arrive at the restaurant "De Tuin van Parijs" (The Garden of Paris) and a showdown happens which will turn the story upside down.

== Cast ==
- Antonie Kamerling ... Daniel Ackerman
- Thekla Reuten ... Francesca Moorman
- Dirk Zeelenberg ... Martin Teitel
- Peter Paul Muller ... Harold Cammer
- Kasper van Kooten ... Philip Berman
- Michael Pas ... Alfred Fener
- Peer Mascini ... Mr. Moorman
- Cecile Heuer ... Mrs. Moorman
- Elsje de Wijn ... Mrs. Ackerman
- Victor Löw ... Jean
- Roos Ouwehand ... Aafje
- Rifka Lodeizen ... Philip Berman's girlfriend
- Fabienne de Vries ... Waitress ('B-Power')
- Frans van Deursen ... Taxi driver
