= Son of Mine =

2015 film

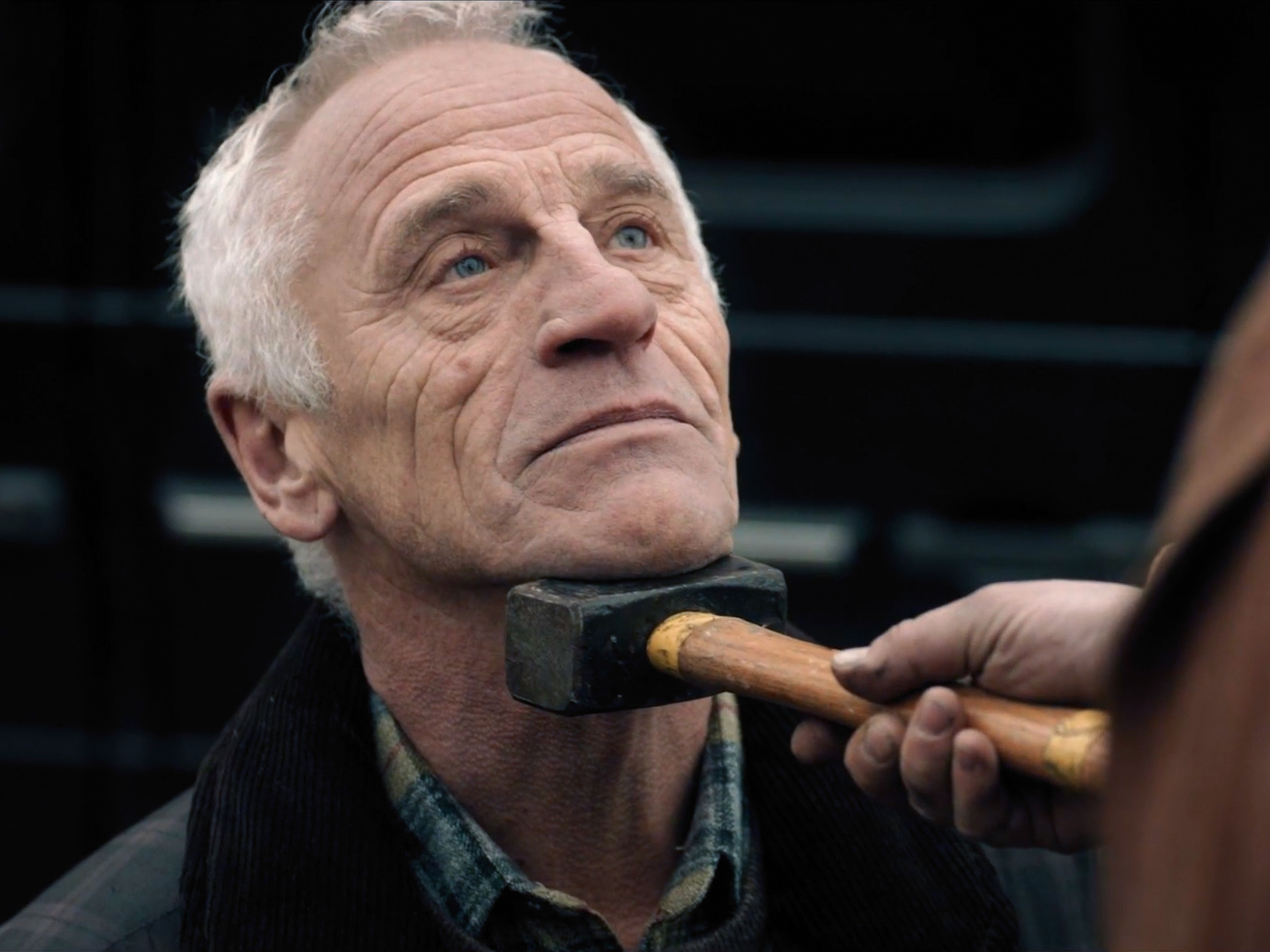
- Johan Leysen in Son of Mine (2015)
- Directed by: Remy van Heugten
- Starring: Johan Leysen; Ali Ben Horsting
- Distributed by: September Film Distribution
- Release dates: 22 January 2015 (IFFR); 29 January 2015 (Netherlands)
- Running time: 1h 42min
- Country: Netherlands
- Language: Limburgish

Son of Mine (Limburgish: Gluckauf) is a 2015 Dutch crime film directed by Remy van Heugten. The film won 4 Golden Calves: Best Feature Film, Best Director, Best Screenplay, and Best Cinematography.

== Cast ==
- Johan Leysen as Vester
- Ali Ben Horsting as Walt
- Vincent van der Valk as Jeffrey Frissen
- Bart Slegers as Lei Frissen
