= Onno Hoes =

Dutch politician (born 1961)

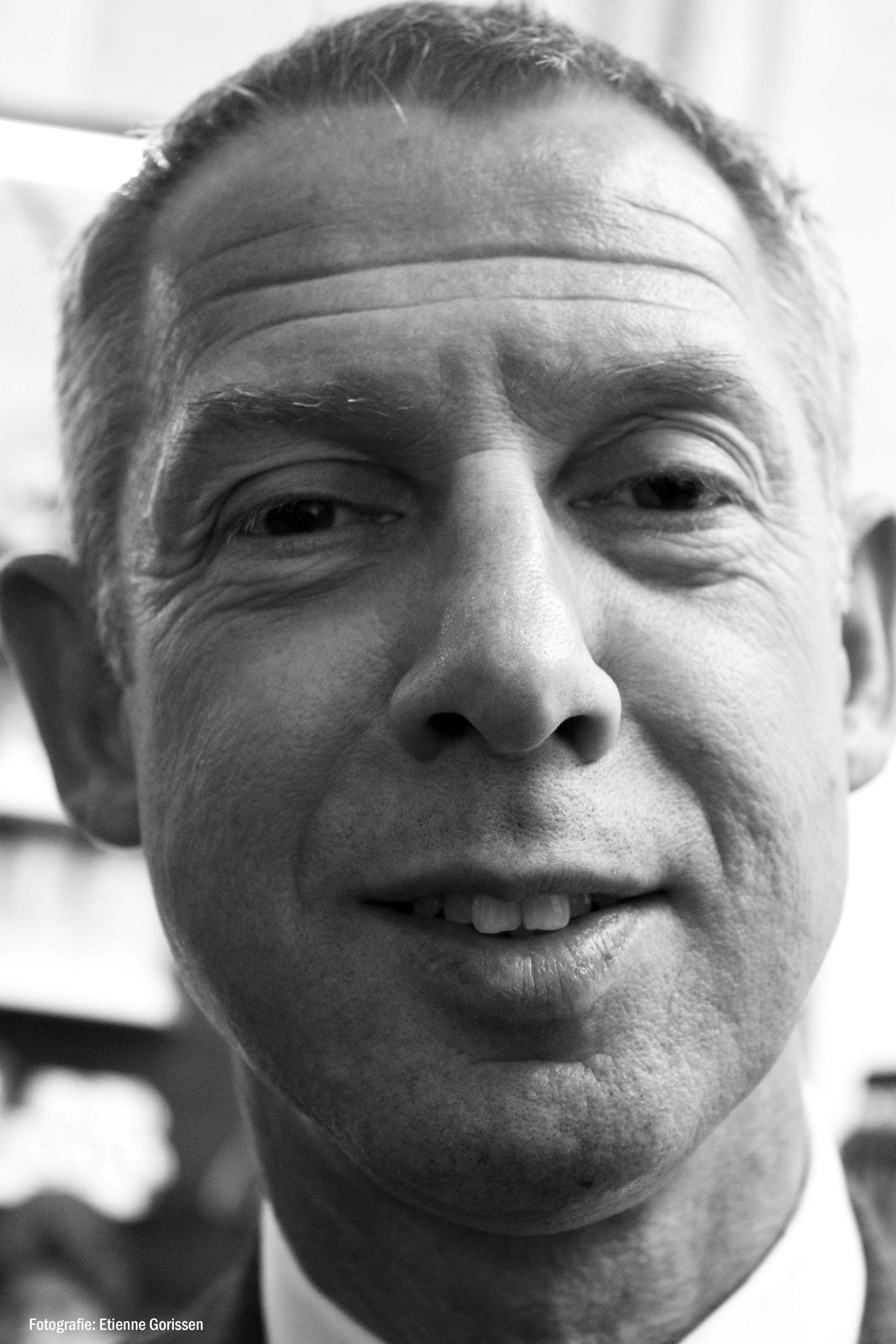
- Onno Hoes in 2011

Mayor of Haarlemmermeer
- In office 28 November 2017 – 2019
- Preceded by: Theo Weterings

Mayor of Maastricht
- In office 1 November 2010 – 30 June 2015
- Preceded by: Jan Mans (Acting)
- Succeeded by: Annemarie Penn-te Strake

Personal details
- Born: 5 June 1961 (age 65) Leiden, Netherlands
- Party: People's Party for Freedom and Democracy (from 1979)
- Spouse: Albert Verlinde (m. 2001; div. 2014)
- Relatives: Isa Hoes (sister)
- Occupation: Politician · Civil servant · Economist · Businessman · Nonprofit director

Onno Hoes (born 5 June 1961) is a Dutch politician of the People's Party for Freedom and Democracy (VVD) and businessman. He was the acting Mayor of Haarlemmermeer from 28 November 2017 till 10 July 2019

He was Mayor of Maastricht from 1 November 2010 till 30 June 2015. From 11 March 2010 till 12 October 2014 he was also Chairman of the Dutch Center Information and Documentation Israel. Before becoming mayor of Maastricht Hoes has held several political positions. From 1992 to 2003 he was a member of the provincial parliament of North Brabant, from 1993 to 1998 he was also a member of the municipal council of 's-Hertogenbosch, and from 2001 to 2010 he was a member of the provincial executive of North Brabant, dealing with different subjects like economic development, international relations and ecology.

Hoes has a partly Jewish background, his mother is Jewish and his father Catholic. He was married to Dutch TV presenter Albert Verlinde. Actress Isa Hoes is his sister. In 2014 Onno Hoes divorced Albert Verlinde.

In 2013 Hoes revealed that he had several extramarital affairs since his election as Mayor of Maastricht. The scandal played out in public leading the Maastricht city council to take a vote of confidence.

Despite surviving the council vote, Onno Hoes announced his resignation as mayor of Maastricht on 10 December. In the announcement, Hoes offered to stay on until a new mayor had been appointed.

Political offices
Preceded by Jan Mans; Acting	Mayor of Maastricht; 2010–2015	Succeeded by Annemarie; Penn-te Strake
Preceded by Theo Weterings	Mayor of Haarlemmermeer; Acting; 2017–present	Incumbent
Non-profit organization positions
Unknown	Chairman of the Center Information and Documentation Israel; 2010–2015	Unknown
