= Revelations of an Insomniac =

Openbaringen van een Slapeloze
- Theatrical release poster
- Directed by: Pim de la Parra
- Written by: Paul Ruven, J.P. Vernu
- Produced by: Sierk Vojackek
- Cinematography: Jan Wich
- Edited by: Marc Nolens
- Distributed by: Cor Koppies Filmdistribution
- Release date: 1991
- Country: Netherlands
- Language: Dutch

Revelations of an Insomniac or Openbaringen van een Slapeloze is a 1991 Dutch drama film directed by Pim de la Parra.

== Cast ==
- Miguel Stigter ... Prof. Mr. Dr. Drs. J.A. Wierook
- Marian Mudder ... Anna Wierook (as Marian Morée)
- Liz Snoyink ... Lydia
- Bart Oomen ... 1st Research assistant
- Bodil de la Parra ... 2nd Research assistant
- Joanna Swaan ... 3rd Research assistant
- Johan Leysen ... Visitor
- Camilla Braaksma ... Visitor
- Jacob Smolders ... Truck driver
