= Tykho Moon =

1996 film

- Directed by: Enki Bilal
- Starring: Julie Delpy; Johan Leysen
- Distributed by: Steward
- Release dates: 28 November 1996 (Germany); 5 March 1997 (France)
- Running time: 1h 42min
- Countries: France; Germany
- Language: French

Tykho Moon is a 1996 French-German science fiction film directed by Enki Bilal.

== Plot ==
Somewhere on the Moon stands a dusty colony, a crude replica of a decaying Paris, chaotic and divided by a wall reminiscent of the Berlin Wall. The Dictator Mac Bee rules the city with an iron fist, but a strange illness is eating away at him, as well as at his sons, condemning them to certain death. Their only hope lies in finding Tykho Moon, the mysterious potential donor, presumed dead twenty years earlier but rumored to still be alive.

Their quest, however, is obstructed by the presence of a killer who targets any member of the McBee family daring to venture into the city. This threat, combined with the disease, gradually drives the old, decadent dictator and his clan into madness.

== Cast ==
- Julie Delpy - Lena
- Johan Leysen - Anikst
- Michel Piccoli - McBee
- Marie Laforêt - Eva
- Richard Bohringer - Glenbaar
- Yann Collette - Alvin / Edward

== Reception ==
The film opened in France on 9 screens and grossed $35,790 for the week finishing 15th at the box office.
