= Elsje de Wijn =

Dutch actress (1944–2026)

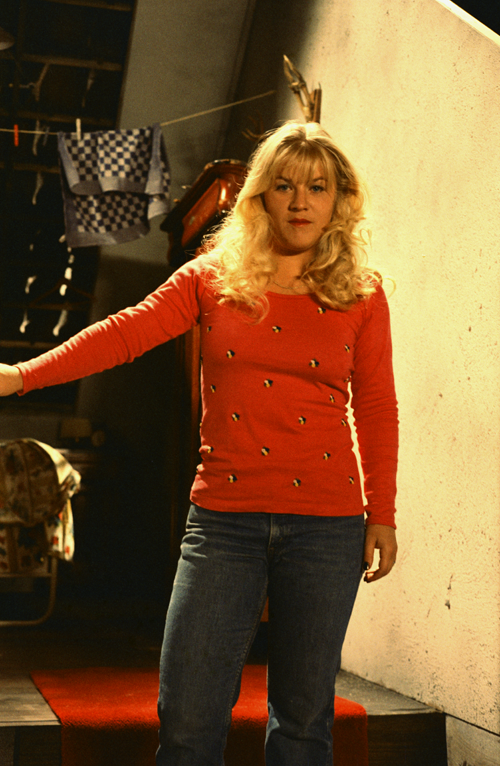
- de Wijn in Citroentje met suiker (1973)
- Born: Elsje Agatha Francisca de Wijn; 3 January 1944; Amsterdam, German-occupied Netherlands
- Died: 5 January 2026 (aged 82); Amsterdam, Netherlands
- Education: Amsterdamse Toneelschool
- Occupation: Actress

Elsje Agatha Francisca de Wijn (3 January 1944 – 5 January 2026) was a Dutch actress.

De Wijn attended the Amsterdamse Toneelschool before joining Toneelgroep Amsterdam. She also appeared in several films.

De Wijn died from Alzheimer's disease in Amsterdam, on 5 January 2026, at the age of 82.

== Filmography ==
- Frank en Eva (1973)
- De stille Oceaan (1984)
- For a Lost Soldier (1992)
- Seth & Fiona (1994)
- Baantjer (1997–1999)
- Het 14e kippetje (1998)
