= Celblok H =

Dutch television series

Celblok H (working title Wentworth) is the Dutch adaptation of Wentworth, the Australian drama series about a women's prison divided in two camps. The series starred Isa Hoes. Produced by Willem Zijlstra, the series was broadcast at SBS6 between March 3, 2014, and March 27, 2017. The last twenty episodes are original scripts.

== Story ==
Suzanne Kramer (Suus for intimacy) is a hairdresser sent to prison for her failed attempt to kill her abusive husband. Lex Holt and Freddie Hendriks are fighting for leadership of the prisoners, and choosing middle-ground is no option. Suus struggles to make the right decision; she murders Holt and gets isolated for three months.

Freddie becomes the new topdog while the new directress, Agnes Binkhorst, appears to have a hidden agenda; ending the drug-schemes by any means necessary. Suus has her revenge on Lex's son Dylan, who killed her daughter; she gets life but also the respect of the other inmates. Freddie steps down to train as a lawyer, leaving Suus in charge.

The novelty of being top dog eventually wears off; Suus realises she is in deep trouble. Binkhorst wants to get rid of her because she has been used. An attempt to burn down the place leads to Binkhorst being imprisoned herself.

Binkhorst joins forces with Caat Bergsma, an angry feminist who succeeded in murdering Suus's husband. Meanwhile, her trial is suspended because none of the testifiers chose to appear in court. Suus manages to get Binkhorst framed after all, but gives her own life in the process.
