= Above the Mountains =

1992 film

Boven de Bergen
- Film poster
- Directed by: Digna Sinke
- Release date: 1992
- Country: Netherlands
- Language: Dutch

Above the Mountains or Boven de Bergen is a 1992 Dutch film directed by Digna Sinke.

== Cast ==
- Rosmarie Blaauboer ... Neeltje
- Catherine ten Bruggencate ... Rina
- Eric Corton ... Jean Paul
- Renée Fokker ... Hélène
- Esgo Heil ... Stefan
- Johan Leysen ... Vincent
- Sacco van der Made ... Veerman
- Kees Hulst ... Vader Jean Paul
- Maartje Molenaar ... Kleine Rita
- Stan Diepenmaat ... Igor
- Rian Schepens ... Campingbeheerster
- Anne van Dijk ... Vader
- Marietje Noordkamp ... Moeder
- Gerard Dunhof ... Oom Piet
- Patricia Timmerman ... Chips-meisje en Badminton speelster
- Hennie Kok
