= De stille Oceaan =

1984 film

- Theatrical release poster
- Directed by: Digna Sinke
- Written by: Annemarie Van de Putte
- Produced by: Hans Klap
- Starring: Josée Ruiter
- Cinematography: Albert van der Wildt
- Edited by: Jan Wouter van Reijen
- Music by: Peter Vermeersch
- Distributed by: Euro-Centrafilm BV
- Release date: 15 March 1984
- Running time: 105 minutes
- Countries: Belgium; Netherlands
- Language: Dutch

De stille Oceaan is a 1984 Belgian-Dutch drama film directed by Digna Sinke. It was entered into the 34th Berlin International Film Festival.

== Cast ==
- Josée Ruiter as Marian Winters
- Andrea Domburg as Emilia Winters
- Josse De Pauw as Emil Winters
- Monique Kramer as Rita Winters
- Julien Schoenaerts as Frits Rosmeyer
- Rafi Nahual as Enrique
- Luis Granados as Miguel
- Cor Witschge as Portier
- Jan Moonen as Hotelreceptionist
- Johan Leysen as Jan Verstraete
- Pim Lambeau as Hospita
- Peter Tuinman as Agent
- Jaap van Donselaar as T.V.-redacteur
- Reinout Bussemaker as Begeleider Tehuis
- Elsje de Wijn as Receptioniste
- Gerrard Verhage as Journalist
