= All Stars (1997 film) =

1997 Dutch comedy drama film

- Theatrical release poster
- Directed by: Jean van de Velde
- Written by: Mischa Alexander; Jean van de Velde
- Produced by: Rolf Koot
- Starring: Danny de Munk; Daniël Boissevain; Peter Paul Muller; Antonie Kamerling; Isa Hoes; Daphne Deckers; Frits Lambrechts
- Cinematography: Jules van den Steenhoven
- Edited by: Sander Vos
- Music by: Fons Merkies
- Distributed by: PolyGram Filmed Entertainment Distribution
- Release date: 1 May 1997
- Running time: 115 minutes
- Country: Netherlands
- Language: Dutch

All Stars is a 1997 Dutch sports comedy film, which was the base for the Emmy Award-winning television show of the same name. Directed by Jean van de Velde. Together with Mischa Alexander he was also responsible for the script. The film premièred on 2 May 1997. The sequel All Stars 2: Old Stars was released in 2011. In 2004, the film was remade in Britain as Things to Do Before You're 30.

== Plot ==
Seven friends (Bram, Mark, Johnny, Peter, Paul, Willem, and Hero) have been playing football every weekend for their club, Swift Boys, since they were young. They hardly ever win, but that's not what matters to them. Captain Bram discovers that they'll be playing their 500th match this coming weekend. He enthusiastically introduces the group and suggests throwing a big party, but his teammates aren't interested in arranging it. They also feel that after all these years, it's slowly time to stop because they want to do other things with their lives. Bram encourages them, and the team eventually decides to continue playing football. Outside of football, many problems and dilemmas arise. For example, Hero falls madly in love with the beautiful Claire, who works for his father. He doesn't know how to explain this to her and decides to perform for her in a venue. Roos and Mark are having relationship problems because Mark repeatedly cheats on the pregnant Roos. Johnny's father, the team's former coach, is seriously ill but longs to see his team play one more time before he dies. And Bram has been gay for years, unbeknownst to his friends. He finds it difficult to come out in the macho world of football.

== Cast ==
- Antonie Kamerling as Hero
- Danny de Munk as Bram
- Daniël Boissevain as Johnny
- Thomas Acda as Willem
- Peter Paul Muller as Mark
- Plien van Bennekom as Sas
- Raymi Sambo as Paual
- Nora Mullens as Taxi chauffeur
- Kasper van Kooten as Peter
- Alfred van den Heuvel as Scheids #1
- Isa Hoes as Roos
- Joan Royé as Joan
