= Cecília Guimarães =

Portuguese actress (1927–2021)

Cecilia Guimarães (28 May 1927 – 2 February 2021) was a Portuguese actress.

== Early life ==
Cecília Guimarães was born in Lisbon on 28 May 1927.

== Career ==
After the course at the National Conservatory, she debuted with A Qualquer Hora o Diabo Vem de Pedro Bom, at the Rua da Fé Theater (1951), Passes by Companhia Alves da Cunha and Teatro do Gerifalto. At the Teatro Experimental do Porto, where, under the direction of António Pedro, she performed O Crime da Aldeia Velha by Bernardo Santareno. Still in the 50s, she went to work for the Diogo d'Avila Electrical Conductor Factory (Cables Avila) office. She was then invited by António Lopes Ribeiro to participate in the film O Primo Basílio, where she was distinguished with the SNI "Best Actress" award.

She was one of the pioneering actresses on television, playing several pieces of teleteatro. She belonged to the cast of Companhia Rey Colaço-Robles Monteiro for several years (Teatro Nacional D. Maria II). She also worked at the Teatro Experimental de Cascais, Companhia de Teatro de Almada, Companhia de Teatro de Braga, and United Artists.

Guimarães participated in several films, such as: "As Horas de Maria" (1979); "Francisca" (1981); "O Lugar do Morto" (1984); "The Daughter" (2003); "Armpits" (2016); "A Canção de Lisboa" (2016); "Olga Drummond" (2018).

On television she made some soap operas, telefilms and several series, such as: "A Mala de Cartão" (1988); "A Morgadinha dos Canaviais" (1990); "Cluedo" (1995); "Filhos do Vento" (1997); "Casa da Saudade" (2000); "Estação da Minha Vida" (2001) and "Hotel Cinco Estrelas" (2013).

== Death ==
Guimarães died from complications related to COVID-19 at the Hospital Santa Maria in Lisbon on 2 February 2021, aged 93, during the COVID-19 pandemic in Portugal.
