= Boudewijn Büch =

Dutch writer and television presenter

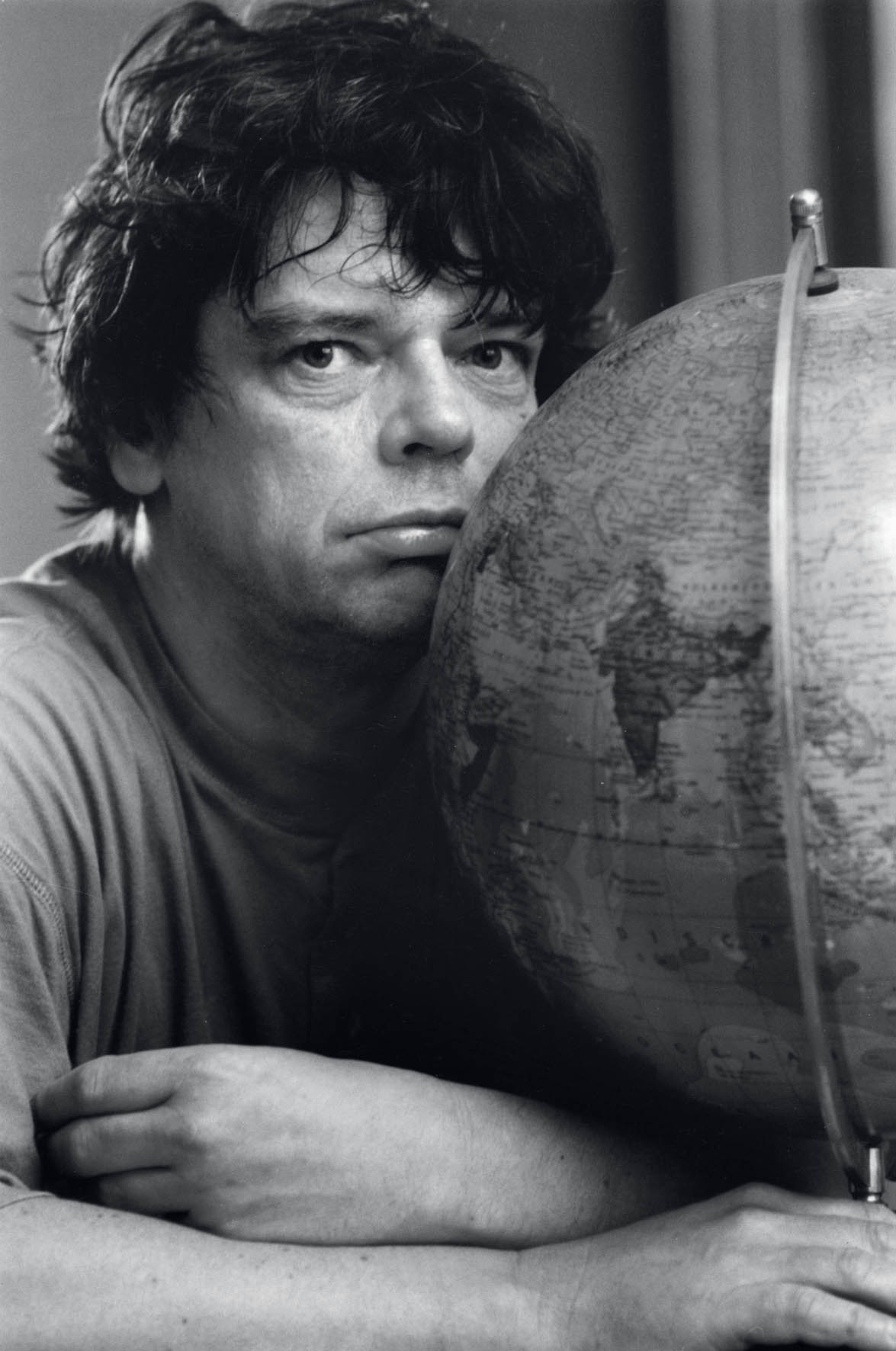
- Boudewijn Büch, 1994
- Born: Boudewijn Maria Ignatius Büch; 14 December 1948; The Hague
- Died: 23 November 2002 (aged 53); Amsterdam
- Occupations: author, poet, presenter
- Relatives: five brothers, including Menno Buch (presenter)

Boudewijn Maria Ignatius Büch (14 December 1948 – 23 November 2002) was a Dutch writer, poet and television presenter.

== Early life ==
Büch was born in a Catholic family. He was born in a hospital in The Hague and spent his childhood in Wassenaar. His father was a civil servant. He and Boudewijn's mother divorced in 1963. Boudewijn had five brothers, one of them the TV-presenter Menno Buch.

== Controversy ==
Büch exhibited pseudologia fantastica, uttering various falsehoods about his life. Tellingly, a 2004 biography has the subtitle (translated) "Report on a mystification".

One of these lies was that he was the father of a child that had died at the age of around six. The boy he referred to did exist, but the child was not his and it did not die. This lie formed the basis of his successful novel De kleine blonde dood ("The small blond death").

== Television ==
One of Büch's most successful television programmes was De wereld van Boudewijn Büch (VARA, summer 1988 – autumn 2001), in which he travelled all around the world to show and give his views on various places, people and phenomena.

== Bibliophilia ==
Büch was a bibliophile, specializing in various subjects, including biology, Goethe and explorers. At his death, he possessed approximately 100,000 books. Furthermore he was very interested in islands, specifically islands that were hard to visit, like Bouvet Island near Antarctica. He wrote five non-fiction books on the subject of islands, commonly known in Dutch as the 'Islands series'.

== Death ==
Büch was found dead in his house on Amsterdam's Keizersgracht on 23 November 2002 and is believed to have died that day at circa 2pm of a cardiac arrest. Büch was survived by his mother, five brothers and twelve nieces and nephews.
