= Richard Gartner =

American psychologist

Richard B. Gartner (born in New York City ca. 1947) is a clinical psychologist who was trained both as a family therapist and an interpersonal psychoanalyst. One of the founders of MaleSurvivor: the National Organization on Male Sexual Victimization, he is a Past President of the organization and now chairs its advisory board. He is known for his research and clinical work in the area of child sexual abuse against boys and its aftermath for them as men.

== Career ==
Gartner is a graduate of the William Alanson White Institute for Psychiatry, Psychoanalysis, and Psychiatry (wawhite.org) in New York City, founded its Sexual Abuse Service, and served as the Service's director from 1994 to 2005.

He has authored numerous books about boyhood sexual abuse between 1999 and 2017. In particular, Betrayed as Boys: Psychodynamic Treatment of Sexually Abused Men was Runner-up for the 2001 Gradiva Award for Best Book on a Clinical Subject given by the National Association for the Advancement of Psychoanalysis (NAAP) and was translated into Japanese language in 2005.

He's a regular speaker on the topic of male sexual victimization, and has sometimes been sought for his expertise in newspapers; in 2002 after the Catholic sex abuse cases were revealed, USA Today sought him to comment about sexual abuse against males.

== Education ==
Gartner is a graduate of Haverford College and Columbia. He completed his Ph.D. in clinical psychology in 1972.

== Works ==
BOOKS

- Understanding the Sexual Betrayal of Boys and Men: The Trauma of Sexual Abuse (2018). ISBN 978-1-138-94221-9, ISBN 978-1-138-94222-6, ISBN 978-1-315-67324-0
- Healing Sexually Abused Men and Boys: Treatment for Sexual Abuse, Assault, and Trauma (2018). ISBN 978-1-138-94224-0, ISBN 978-1-138-94225-7, ISBN 978-1-315-67322-6
- Trauma and Countertrauma, Resilience and Counterresilience: Insights from Psychoanalysts and Trauma Experts (2017). ISBN 978-1138860919, ISBN 1138860913
- Beyond Betrayal: Taking Charge of Your Life after Boyhood Sexual Abuse (2005) ISBN 978-0-471-61910-9
- Betrayed as Boys: Psychodynamic Treatment of Sexually Abused Men (1999, 2001) ISBN 1-57230-644-0
- Memories of Sexual Betrayal: Truth, Fantasy, Repression, and Dissociation (1997) ISBN 1-56821-704-8

ARTICLES

- Dissociation and Counterdissociation: Nuanced and Binary Perceptions of Good and Evil (2018). Contemporary Psychoanalysis
- Altered (Self) States: A Meditation on “Exploring Dissociation and Dissociative Identity Disorder” (2015). Psychoanalytic Perspectives, 12:1, 84-86
- Trauma and countertrauma, resilience and counterresilience (2014). Contemporary Psychoanalysis, 50:609–626
- Failed "Fathers," boys betrayed' (2007). Chapter in Predatory Priests, Silenced Victims, M.G. Frawley-O’Dea and V. Goldner, Eds. ISBN 0-8265-1547-9
- The Jewish men dancing inside me' (2007). Chapter in The Still Small Voice, M Holzman, Ed. ISBN 0-8074-1057-8
- Predatory priests: Sexually abusing Fathers (2004). Studies in Gender and Sexuality, 5:31-56
- Coming to terms with sexual abuse (2002). Psychologist-Psychoanalyst, 22:18.
- Effects on boys of priest abuse (2002). Psychologist-Psychoanalyst, 22:15-17
- Relational aftereffects in manhood of boyhood sexual abuse (1999). Journal of Contemporary Psychotherapy, 29:319-353.
- On masculine strength, emotional detachment, and the praise of incest (1999). Gender and Psychoanalysis, 4: 307–316.
- Cinematic depictions of boyhood sexual victimization (1999). Gender and Psychoanalysis, 4:253-289.
- Sexual victimization of boys by men: Meanings and consequences (1999). Journal of Gay and Lesbian Psychotherapy, 3:1-33.
- Memories of sexual betrayal: Psychoanalytic perspectives on the debate (1997). Round Robin, Winter, 1997: 4–5, 16.
- Considerations in the psychoanalytic treatment of men who were sexually abused as children (1997). Psychoanalytic Psychology, 14:13-41. Originally presented at April, 1993, meeting of Division 39 (Psychoanalysis) of the American Psychological Association, New York, and the July, 1993, International Conference of the Sandor Ferencz Society, Budapest
- Managing chronic loss and grief: Contrapuntal needs of an AIDS patient and his therapist (1997). Chapter in Hope and Mortality: Psychodynamic Approaches to AIDS and HIV, M. Blechner, Ed. ISBN 0-88163-223-6
- An analytic group for sexually abused men (1997), International Journal of Group Psychotherapy, 47:373-383. Originally presented as 'Identifications and transferences in analytic group therapy for sexually abused men' at April, 1995 meeting of Division 39 (Psychoanalysis) of the American Psychological Association, Santa Monica
- Incestuous boundary violations in families of borderline patients (1996). Contemporary Psychoanalysis, 32:73-80. Originally presented at April, 1992, meeting of Division 39 (Psychoanalysis) of the American Psychological Association, Philadelphia
- The relationship between Interpersonal Psychoanalysis and Family Therapy (1995). Chapter in Handbook of Interpersonal Psychoanalysis, M. Lionells, J. Fiscalini, C. Mann, and D. Stern, Eds. ISBN 0-88163-120-5
- (with Bass, A., and Wolbert, S.) 'The use of the one-way mirror in restructuring family boundaries (1979), Family Therapy, 6:27-37
- (with Fulmer, R.H., Weinshel, M., and Goldklank, S.) The family life cycle: Developmental crises and their structural impact on families in a community mental health center (1978), Family Process, 17:47-58
