= Annemarie Penn-te Strake =

Dutch lawyer and politician

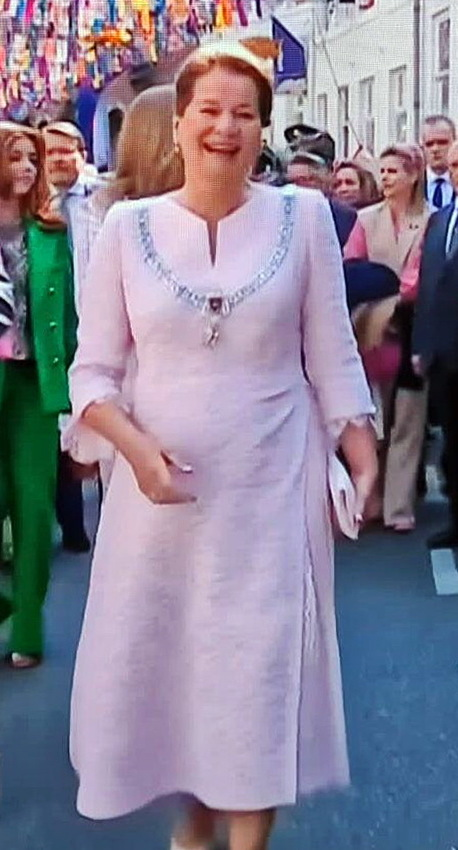
- Mayor Penn-te Strake during Koningsdag 2022 in Maastricht

Mayor of Maastricht
- Incumbent
- Assumed office 1 July 2015
- Preceded by: Onno Hoes

Personal details
- Born: Johanna Maria Penn-te Strake; 31 July 1953 (age 73) Helmond, Netherlands
- Occupation: Politician · prosecutor · judge
- Website: www.gemeentemaastricht.nl/bestuur/het-college/annemarie-penn-te-strake

Johanna Maria "Annemarie" Penn-te Strake (born 31 July 1953) is a Dutch jurist and politician. She was mayor of Maastricht from 1 July 2015 until 1 July 2023.

== Education and career ==
Penn-te Strake grew up in Deurne and studied law at the Radboud University Nijmegen. She worked as a judge and as a public prosecutor in the Court of Maastricht. Until being elected as a mayor she was working as an Attorney General for the Public Prosecution Service in The Hague. She does not have any political party affiliation.

== Personal life ==
Penn-te Strake is married to Olaf Penn who is a retired surgeon. He resigned from his position as a chairman of the Senior Party Maastricht in 2015.

Political offices
Preceded by Onno Hoes	Mayor of Maastricht; 2015–present	Succeeded by Wim Hillenaar
