= Amby, Maastricht =

Coordinates: 50°52′N 5°44′E

Amby
- neighbourhood & former municipality
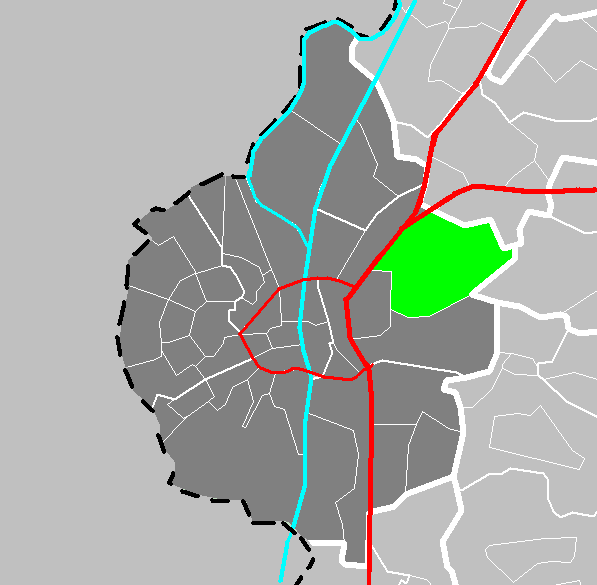
- Location of Amby in Maastricht
- Municipality: Maastricht
- Province: Limburg
- Country: Netherlands

Area
  - Total: 447 ha (1,100 acres)

Population
  - Total: 6,565
  - Density: 1,470/km^{2} (3,800/sq mi)

A former village, Amby is now a neighborhood (part 25) of Maastricht, in the Netherlands, located about 4 km northeast of the center of the city.

From January 2, 1839, to July 1, 1970, Amby existed as a separate municipality. As of 2017, it had a total population of 6,565.

In November 2008, an amateur archaeologist discovered in a field 2 meters out of Amby the largest ever found Celtic gold and silver treasure in the Netherlands. Archaeologists from Maastricht and the VU University Amsterdam recovered 70 silver and 39 golden coins which dates back to the 1st century before Christ.

== Images ==
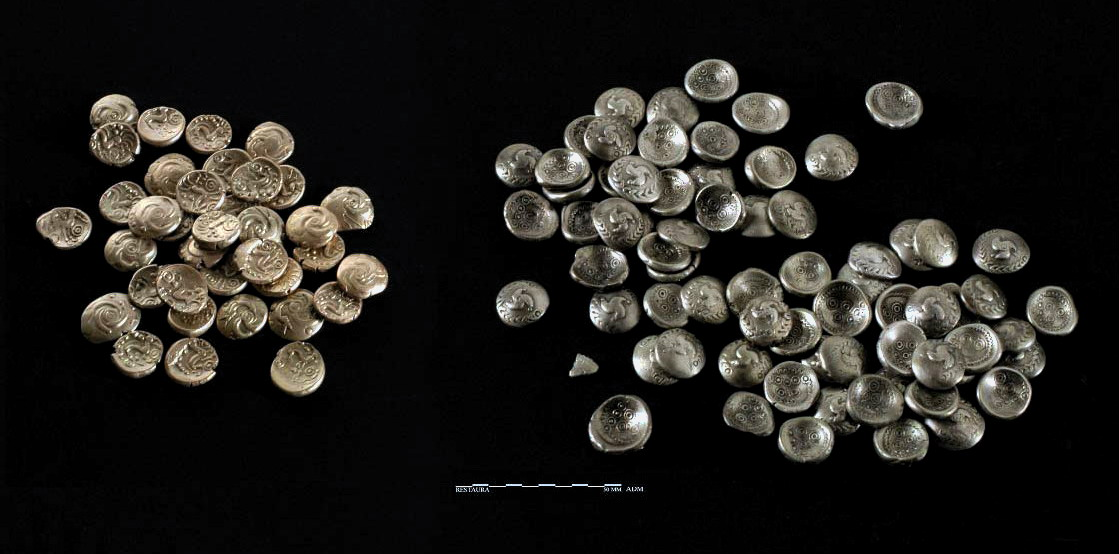
Celtic treasure of Amby. 1st BC silver and gold coins, found in the Maastricht neighbourhood of Amby in 2008. Perhaps hidden in the ground by Eburones fleeing for Roman invaders.

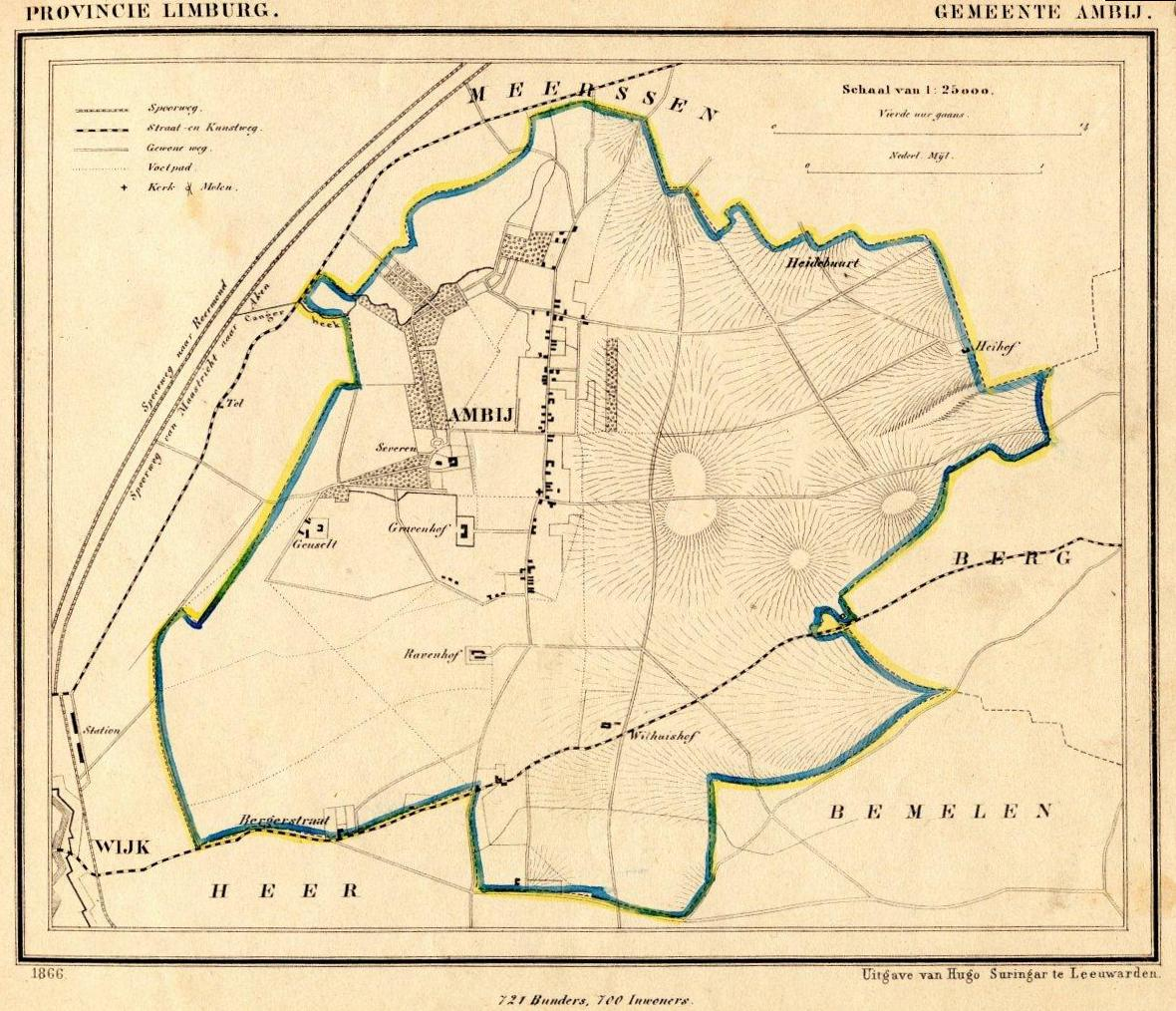
The former municipality of "Ambij" on an 1866 map.
