= Jean van de Velde (director) =

Dutch film director (born 1957)

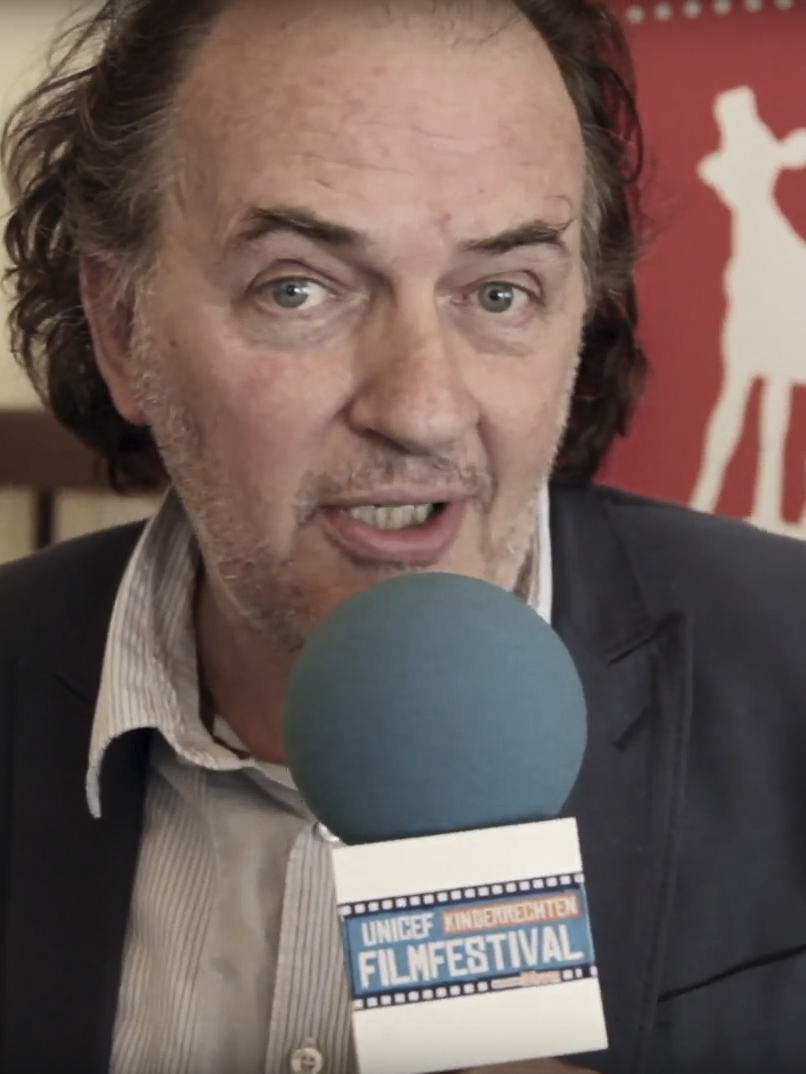
- Van de Velde in 2013
- Born: 14 March 1957 (age 68); Bukavu, DR Congo
- Occupations: Film director Screenwriter
- Years active: 1979–present
- Relatives: Yannick van de Velde (son)

Jean van de Velde (born 14 March 1957) is a Dutch film director and screenwriter. He has directed twelve films since 1979. His film The Silent Army competed in the Un Certain Regard section at the 2009 Cannes Film Festival. He is the father of actor Yannick van de Velde.

== Selected filmography ==
- The Little Blonde Death (1993)
- De Flat (writer, 1994)
- All Stars (1997)
- Leak (2000)
- Floris (2004)
- Wild Romance (2006)
- The Silent Army (Original title: Wit Licht) (2008)
- All Stars 2: Old Stars (2011)
- The Price of Sugar (2013)
- Bram Fischer (2017)
