= List of Jimmy Two-Shoes characters =

The main protagonists of the show from left to right: Beezy, Heloise and Jimmy

This is a character list of the Canadian animated series Jimmy Two-Shoes. The series focused on adventure and comedy, and was created by Edward Kay and Sean Scott.

== Main characters ==
=== Jimmy Two-Shoes ===
James "Jimmy" Two-Shoes (voiced by Cory Doran) is the titular eponymous main protagonist of the cartoon, a perpetually optimistic, thrill-seeking and effeminate 14-year-old boy. Jimmy is tall, has blonde hair and a gap in his teeth. He has a mission to spread happiness to Miseryville, which makes him a perpetual source of irritation to Lucius Heinous VII, whom Jimmy nicknames "Luci". He is often seen doing extreme activities despite Heloise's warnings, is distracted very easily, and gullible. In "Catalogue of Misery", it is shown he may have financial problems. Jimmy is altruistic and will quickly step into situations, even life-threatening ones, to aid others. Jimmy is oblivious to the fact that Heloise has a crush on him, even when she tries to make it obvious, somewhat because whenever she tries to do something nice, it always backfires.

=== Beezy JoJo Heinous ===
Beezy JoJo Heinous (voiced by Brian Froud) is the slow-witted, lazy, egocentric, hedonistic, yet loyal teenage son of Lucius Heinous VII. He resembles his father, but is much larger and has a tail. To the eternal dismay and embarrassment of his father, he would rather hang out with Jimmy and Heloise than spread misery or learn to govern Misery Inc. He is frequently seen lazing on a couch, even outdoors, and constantly uses the phrase "No you are!" as a comeback or "Burn!" to punctuate an insult. Beezy has a mutually strained relationship with Heloise and has a girlfriend named Saffi who Jimmy set him up in "Jimmy Matchmaker". They remain together until "She Loves Me".

=== Heloise ===
Heloise (voiced by Tabitha St. Germain) is a super-intelligent and tomboyish yet sadistic, short-tempered, and psychotic small girl, Heloise is Jimmy's second best friend. She is a depraved, evil genius/mad scientist who enjoys spreading chaos and works for Lucius as the head-of-research and development at Misery, Inc, producing despair-inducing products for the corporation. Whenever she tries to scientifically explain her inventions/plans to Jimmy and Beezy, she usually has to give a simplified version of the idea so they can understand. She has an intense, unrequited crush on Jimmy.

=== Lucius Heinous VII ===
Lucius Heinous VII (voiced by Seán Cullen) is the devil-like ruler of Miseryville. He harbors great contempt for Jimmy, because of his happy-go-lucky attitude continuously foiling his plots to make the town even more miserable. It is stated that Heinous is several centuries old and has cryogenically frozen his father and his ancestors, dating back to Lucius I. He had a miserable childhood and sometimes has painful flashbacks of how his father was abusive to him.

=== Samy Garvin ===
Samuel "Samy" Garvin (voiced by Dwayne Hill) is Lucius' goblin assistant with dreams of stardom and fame and a lateral lisp. He is rather timid, sensitive, and weak, and is often abused by his boss. In the episode "Pop-Sicles", it is revealed that he previously worked for Lucius' father, Lucius Heinous VI for at least 87 years. He is usually assigned to do the most disgusting or dangerous jobs Misery Inc. has to offer.

=== Cerbee ===
Cerbee (voiced by Seán Cullen) - Jimmy's loyal but gluttonous and rambunctious pet. He is a green, dog-like monster with horns and one eye. Cerbee seems to dislike Samy and Beezy, but he seems to like Heloise and Lucius. Cerbee loves his owner Jimmy because he likes to licking faces, digging holes, eating things, and playing fetch.

== Recurring characters ==
- Jez (voiced by Valerie Buhagiar) is Lucius's gold digger girlfriend who resembles a tall, blue anthropomorphic cat-like creature who has interchangeable noses. She is very selfish and spoiled, and often breaks up or threatens to break up with Lucius if he is unable to please her. She has a dog named Jasmeen, who once fell in love with Cerbee.
- Lucius Heinous VI (voiced by Seán Cullen) is Lucius Heinous VII's father and Beezy's grandfather, whom he has kept frozen in the factory for twenty years due to being even more tyrannical and abusive than the current Lucius. The specific details of Heinous' freezing vary between episodes.
- Dr. Ludwig Von Scientist (voiced by Dwayne Hill) is a mad scientist who lives in Miseryville. He resembles an egg-like creature with a pointy nose, a mustache, glasses, and a lab coat. He has appeared in many episodes and has helped out Jimmy and Beezy in crises. It has been said that along with Heloise, he is one of the most brilliant minds in all of Miseryville, although Heloise is shown to be far more intelligent than him.
- Saffi (voiced by Sunday Muse) is Beezy's ex-girlfriend, an orange, one-eyed, monster-like creature with a simple-minded and feral personality. Saffi is usually capable of little speech, not saying much outside of "crush", "yogurt", "smoothy-smooth", and "scratchy-scratchy", but can communicate in full sentences.
- Dorkus (voiced by Dwayne Hill) is a small pale creature with brown hair and is Heloise's assistant. He wears a one-lens eyeglass (he only has one eye) and a suit. He seems to be an inventor, though his products are not as practical as Heloise's.
- General Molotov (voiced by Dwayne Hill) is a tan troll monster with pointy ears and a strong build. He works for Lucius and has a young son, a baby daughter, and a wife that intimidates him. He refers to those of smaller stature than him as maggots and speaks with a Russian dialect. His name is probably derived from Moloch or Vyacheslav Molotov.
  - Molotov's Wife (voiced by Valerie Buhagiar) is the wife of General Molotov, and a yellow, four-armed-and-legged monster who seems to be quite bossy and strict. She, like her husband, speaks in a Russian accent.
  - Tori is the son of General Molotov. He gets great enjoyment out of making his little sister vomit and only seemed to be jealous of the attention she gets from others.
  - Blamo - General Molotov's baby daughter. She is a very cute and small baby who vomits constantly.
- Rudolfo (voiced by Juan Chioran) is a greedy, sly traveling salesman who attempts to sell things that do not actually work and will do anything to make a quick buck. He speaks with a British accent and travels around in a mobile shop on wheels.
  - Peep (voiced by Christian Potenza) is Rudolfo's son and is also a salesman like his father, speaking with a Cockney accent and dressing as a stereotypical street urchin, with tattered, patched-up clothes and hat. He has an unrequited infatuation with Heloise. In his second appearance, his real name is revealed to be Jamie Two Squirrels.
- Reggie Weavil (voiced by Dwayne Hill) is the chief of the Weavils, who live on Mt. Misery. He and Lucius despise each other because of a so-called "harmless" camp joke where he took Lucius' coveted stuffed bunny Coochie Long-Ears and dropped a bear on him in an outhouse, officially beginning the Heinous/Weavil feud.

== Minor characters ==
- Lucius' Ancestors are the former rulers of Miseryville before they were frozen by their sons. Lucius the First is seen to be the most feared by the whole Heinous family because he is seen as the most dangerous, violent, and evil than the rest of the family.
- Runny and the Nosebleeds are a punk rock band which is popular in Miseryville. Jimmy, Beezy, and Heloise are fans of their music.
- The Rodeo Clowns (voiced by Ron Pardo) are evil clowns that hate pretty much everyone who isn't in possession of the same occupation as them. They operate as a ruthless gang in Clownburg, a clown-populated section of Miseryville, and are very territorial. The clown leader is particularly serious about being a clown and enforcing "clown power".
- The Weavils are weasel-like creatures who like to con and make a fool out of Lucius, Beezy, and Jimmy with horrible pranks. The Weavils have a rivalry with Lucius because they played a prank on him at camp.
- Humphrey von Sidekick is Samy's puppet. He is occasionally shown to have a mind of his own.
- Mrs. Cheese-Breath was Lucius's third-grade teacher. She gets her name from her intensively horrible breath.
- The Aaa Guy is a small purple man who can emit the sounds of an entire church choir by himself. He is commonly used to implicate things as heavenly or great.
- Jacomo (voiced by Seán Cullen) is a barber who owns and operates a barbershop in Miseryville. He wears a red-striped barber shirt with a bow-tie and stereotypical Italian barber mustache.
- Chuck the Bus-Driver is a corpse with a pink nose and grey skin. He had developed a very odd friendship with Jimmy. He used to be friends with Beezy and Heloise, but they found him irritating and left him.
- Mrs. Gherkin (voiced by Dwayne Hill) is an evil old lady in the shape of a pickle who is determined to have pickles rule over Miseryville.
- Luigi Pallo is a two-headed Italian gentleman seen in many episodes. Both heads usually argue with each other. They both have black hair, a long nose, and bushy mustache.
- Wreckum is a popular soccer player who Jimmy, Beezy, and Heloise highly admire. He resembles a bull/minotaur and speaks in a Scottish accent. His name is a play on footballer David Beckham.
- Shwartzentiger (voiced by Seán Cullen) is a ferocious, yet talkative tiger-like creature who loves to socialize with his victims. If they get bored from his endless chattering or try to escape, his normal response is to eat them.
- Apple is a pink monster with brown hair and wears a purple dress. She seems to work as a reporter.
- Aunt Pomegranate is Heloise's aunt. Her personality and charm can make Heloise behave nice. Pomegranate is revealed to be just as evil and reckless as Heloise.
- Jasmeen (voiced by Tabitha St. Germain) is Jez's dog. She is a small purple dog called a Boohuahua. She once fell in love with Cerbee. At the end of "Cerbee in Love", it is shown that she is capable of speech.
- Lava Worms are thick pink worm-like creatures with jagged teeth. An individual lava worm (voiced by Cory Doran) lives on the beaches of Miseryville and eats everything in sight. Another lava worm, named Mort, lives under Cerbee's dog house.
- Herman is Heloise's temperamental cousin who appears in "Something About Herman". He looks exactly like Heloise, but with a cap and mustache. When enraged, he becomes an enormous green monster who resembles the Hulk.
- Mean Jean is a ruthless, wealthy girl who tries to take Heloise's title as "queen of mean" in the episode "Heloise's Rival". She has red poofy hair, one eye, and wears a pink dress with a bow.
- Jimmy One-Shoe is a monster with one leg who dresses like Jimmy.
- Mr. Ten makes an appearance in "The Mysterious Mr. Ten". He would not laugh at anything Jimmy tried because he believes Heloise had put a curse on him a long time back because she thought his laugh was annoying.
