= Jan Mans =

Dutch politician (1940–2021)

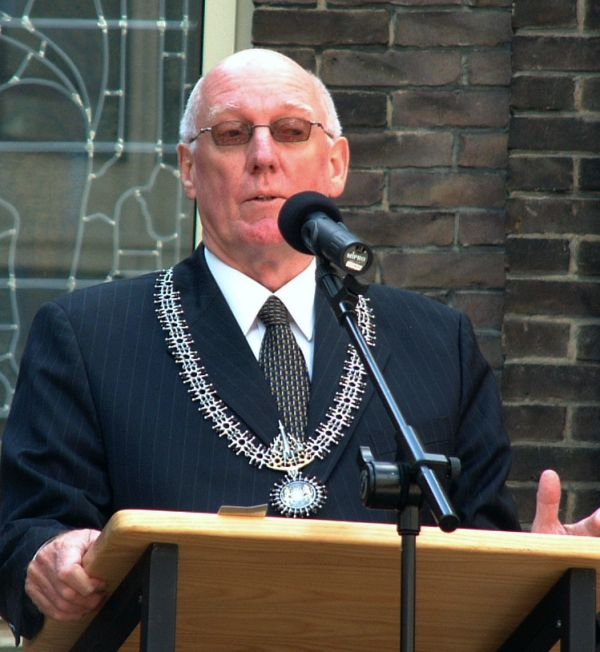
Jan Mans in front of the Enschede synagogue in 2004

Johannes Henricus Hubertus Mans (9 April 1940, Heerlen – 18 February 2021, Meerssen) was a Dutch politician of the Labour Party (PvdA).

== History ==
Mans studied sociology at Radboud University Nijmegen. In 1982, he was named mayor of Meerssen. Six years later, in 1988 he became mayor in Kerkrade.

From 1994 until 2005 he was mayor of Enschede, where he was confronted with the Enschede fireworks disaster of 13 May 2000, which killed 23 people and left hundreds homeless. A report by the commission Oosting found the city government lacking in its inspections of the site before the accident. The mayor's actions during the disaster found general support and he remained in office for another five years.

In May 2005 he left Enschede and was asked to be acting mayor of Venlo. In October 2005 he became acting mayor of Zaanstad until April 2006. From 1 December 2006 he was chairman of the Chamber of commerce of Northern and Southern Limburg. On 14 January 2010, he became acting mayor of Maastricht, and on 1 February 2011 he became acting mayor of Moerdijk, replacing Wim Denie who retired early after a fire at Chemie-Pack. In 2012 Mans was acting mayor of Gouda succeeding Wim Cornelis, who retired early.

In April 2013, he led the talks to form a new coalition in the city council of Meerssen, after the fall of the local coalition.

Mans died on 18 February 2021. He was 80 years of age.

== See also ==
- List of mayors of Kerkrade
