= Celebrity comics =

Comics based on famous people

Celebrity comics are comics based on the fame and popularity of a celebrity. They are a byproduct of merchandising around a certain media star or franchise and have existed since the mass media and comics came into existence in the 19th century. Celebrity comics are usually not held in high esteem by critics, because of their purely commercial nature. They are solely created to capitalize on media trends and therefore published so quickly and cheaply that drawings and narratives tend to be of very low quality.

== Definition ==
Celebrity comics are usually written and drawn for commercial purposes. Publishers try to cash in on the fame of a well known radio, TV, film star or series by launching a comic book or an entire comic book series about these media stars. Comics about sports champions or theatrical actors fall in the same category. The line of thought behind these works is that the audience will be more likely to buy something they already recognize from theatre, film, radio or TV than a brand new series about an original creation.

Despite the commercial potential few of these celebrity comics last long. Their sales are usually based on the amount of attention a certain celebrity receives during a certain period. If the media craze or fad dies down the comic version usually fizzles out as well. Another reason why many of these comics fail in the long run has to do with the fact that companies usually pass both the writing and drawing to less skilled artists, many of which don't have much experience in their profession. Apart from that the artists in question are put under pressure of a TV channel, company or the media star himself to follow their own demands and expectations as much as possible.

Celebrity comics should not be confused with satirical comics or political comics, which lampoon celebrities. While these can sometimes be made to play-off the fame of a celebrity, they usually tend to be less respectful towards the media stars in question and are seldom made with their own participation.

Despite the fact that celebrity comics are considered pure pulp some people have interest in these titles as a mere nostalgic or historical curiosity, of which they enjoy the campiness.

== History ==
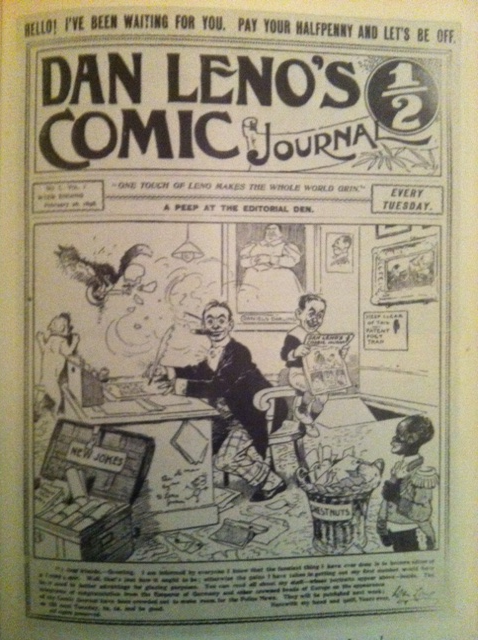
Dan Leno's Comic Journal, Issue No. 1, February 26, 1898

Celebrity comics have existed since the late 19th century. The earliest example was the magazine Dan Leno's Comic Journal (1898), based on the popularity of British music hall comedian Dan Leno. The paper was primarily aimed at young adults and featured a fictional version of Leno. He personally wrote most of the gags and stories, while Tom Browne contributed many of the illustrations. The comedian retained editorial control of the paper, deciding which items to omit. After a run of nearly two years the novelty wore off, and Leno lost interest. The paper shut down on December 2, 1899. Another early example was a comic strip drawn between 1909 and 1913 about the local village eccentric Robert W. Patten by John Hager, which was published in the Seattle Daily Times. When Hollywood started making slapstick films many comics series were made about popular film comedians. E.C. Segar's Charlie Chaplin's Comic Capers is perhaps the most famous example and ran for a solid two years, between 1916 and 1918. Between the 1920s and early 1960s the British magazines Radio Fun and Film Fun were even completely based around comics about radio and film celebrities. In the mid-1930s American artists like Alfred Buescher, Clifton H. Crittenden, Roland Jack Scott, and Arthur J. Palmer also made text comics based on the lives of celebrities who made headlines at the time. When television became popular in the 1950s and 1960s it opened the door for a whole stream of comics based on popular TV shows and stars. In every country with a comics industry examples of celebrity comics can be found.

The longest-running celebrity comic in the world made by the same two creators is the Belgian series Urbanus by Urbanus and Willy Linthout. It was in constant production from 1982 up until 2022.

== Celebrity animated cartoons ==
A subgenre is celebrity animated cartoon series, based on the popularity of a well known musical artist (Hammerman), band (The Beatles, The Jackson 5ive, The Osmonds, New Kids on the Block), film stars (The Abbott and Costello Cartoon Show, Jackie Chan Adventures, Amigo and Friends, Laurel and Hardy, Mary-Kate and Ashley in Action, Chuck Norris: Karate Kommandos, The New Three Stooges,...), TV star (The Gary Coleman Show, Partridge Family 2200 A.D., Mr. T, Laverne & Shirley in the Army, The Fonz and the Happy Days Gang) and/or sports champion (Harlem Globetrotters, I Am the Greatest: The Adventures of Muhammad Ali, Mike Tyson Mysteries, Ronaldinho Gaucho's Team,...).

== List of celebrity comics by country ==
=== Argentina ===
- Chifladuras de Carlitos Balá, based on TV host Carlitos Balá, drawn by Felix Saborido.
- El Oso Arturo, based on a character from the TV show VideoMatch, drawn by Walter Carzon.
- Juan Manuel Fangio, based on auto racing champion Juan Manuel Fangio, drawn by Carlos Freixas.
- Pipito, based on singer Pipo Pescador, drawn by Walter Carzon.
- La Sole, based on the Argentine singer Soledad Pastorutti, drawn by Walter Carzon.
- La Voz del Rioba con los reportajes de Minguito, based on the TV series La Voz del Rioba and character played by Juan Carlos Altavista. It was drawn by Felix Saborido.
- El Gordo Porcel, based on TV and movie star Jorge Porcel. It was drawn by Francisco Mazza.
- El Capitán Piluso, based on the character played by Alberto Olmedo. It was drawn by Francisco Mazza.

=== Belgium ===
- Albert en Co (since 2013 Filip van België), based on the Belgian royal family, written and drawn by Charel Cambré. The series has a mild satirical tone.
- Baba Yega, a children's comic based on the Belgian dance group Baba Yega, written by Leon and drawn by Steve Van Bael.
- Les Diables Rouges, a humoristic sports comic (2013–2014) about the Belgian national association football team by André Lebrun (writing) and Philippe Bercovici (drawings).
- En Daarmee Basta!, a humor comic (2006–2009), based on the children's TV series En Daarmee Basta!, written by Tom Bouden and drawn by Wim Swerts and Luc Van Asten. and Vanas.
- Les Fabuleux Exploits d'Eddy Merckx, a sports comic (1973) about cyclist Eddy Merckx, written by Yves Duval and Christian Lippens.
- Familie Backeljau, a humor comic based on the popular TV sitcom De Familie Backeljau, drawn by Luc Morjaeu.
- F.C. De Kampioenen, a humor comic (1996) based on the popular TV sitcom FC De Kampioenen, written and drawn by Hector Leemans. It's currently one of the most successful Flemish comics series, still selling strong even though the TV series itself came to an end in 2011.
- Flikken, an action comic (2010) based on the TV police series Flikken, written by Zaki Dewaele and drawn by Michaël Vincent.
- Gaston en Leo, a humor comic (1985) based on the comedy duo Gaston en Leo, written and drawn by Jeff Broeckx.
- Geschipper Naast Mathilde, a humor comic (1955) based on the TV sitcom Schipper naast Mathilde, written and drawn by Willy Vandersteen.
- De Geverniste Vernepelingskes, a satirical gag-a-day comic (1997) in which the main characters are comedian Urbanus and comics artist Jan Bosschaert, who consequently also write and draw the gags. The series also features numerous cameos of Flemish celebrities.
- Get Ready!, a humor adventure comic based on the popular boys band Get Ready!, written by Danny Roelens, drawn by Patriek Roelens.
- Le Grand Jojo, a humor comic (2014) based on the Brussels singer and comedian Le Grand Jojo by André Lebrun (writing) and Philippe Bercovici (drawings).
- Jacques Vermeire, a humor adventure comic based on the popular comedian Jacques Vermeire, written and drawn by Geert Kinnaert.
- Jean-Marie Pfaff, a humorous biographical comic about association football player Jean-Marie Pfaff. A first version was drawn by cartoonist Hugo Leyers in 1983, followed by second version from 1984 by K. Luyckx and F. Defossez.
- John Massis, a humor comic about acrobat John Massis, written and drawn by Pirana, who was a close friend of his.
- Jommeke in Bobbejaanland, a 1979 one-shot comic book featuring a cross-over between the comics character Jommeke and popular singer and theme park owner Bobbejaan Schoepen.
- Justine Henin, a 2007 sports comic by Yves Duval and Edouard Aidans about tennis champion Justine Henin.
- De avonturen van K3, a humor adventure comic (2000–...) based on the popular girls group K3, written by Jan Ruysbergh, drawn by Patriek Roelens and later Charel Cambré.
- Kabouter Plop, a humor comic based on the popular children's TV show Kabouter Plop, written and drawn by Jean-Pol, Wim Swerts and Luc Van Asten
- Kamiel in Vuur en Vlam, a one-shot comic book about fire prevention by Marc Daniels and Rik De Wulf, starring Kamiel Spiessens, a comedic character created by Flemish comedian Chris Van den Durpel.
- Katastroof, a humor comic about the local Antwerp band Katastroof written by Tom Metdepenningen, a member of the group.
- Kim, a humor adventure comic (2004) about tennis player Kim Clijsters, written by Hector Leemans and drawn by Wim Swerts and Vanas.
- #Like Me, a humorous comic based on the children's TV show of the same name, written by Tom Bouden, Joyce Beullens and drawn by Michaël Vincent.
- Marc Coucke, a humorous adventure comic based on business man and sports chairman Marc Coucke, written by Leon and drawn by Steve Van Bael.
- Het Manneke, a gag-a-day comic (1962) about the popular TV sketch show Het Manneke, written by the actor himself, Jef Cassiers, and drawn by PIL and later Marc Payot.
- Margriet Hermans, a humor comic (1993) about singer and TV presenter Margriet Hermans, written by Peter Verbelen and drawn by Erik Vancoillie.
- Mega Mindy, a humor adventure comic (2007–2009) based on the popular children's TV show Mega Mindy, drawn by Charel Cambré.
- Merlina, an adventure comic (1986) based on the popular children's TV show Merlina, written by Dick Durver (pseudonym for singer and Vlaams Belang politician Jef Elbers, who was also the TV series' script writer) and drawn by Danny De Haes.
- M-Kids, a humor adventure comic (2002–2004) based on the girl group M-Kids, written by Jan Ruysbergh, drawn by Luc Morjaeu.
- Nachtwacht, a fantasy comic by Peter van Gucht and Steve Van Bael, based on the eponymous children's TV series.
- Papa Chico, a children's comic about TV clown Papa Chico, written by Tony and drawn by Tody.
- De Pfaffs, a humor adventure comic (2003–2004) based on the reality TV series De Pfaffs, written by Ronald Grossey and drawn by Charel Cambré.
- Piet Piraat, a children's comic (2002–2012), based on the TV series Piet Piraat, written and drawn by Wim Swerts and Luc Van Asten.
- De Planckaerts, a humor comic (2003) based on the reality TV series De Planckaerts about former cyclist Eddy Planckaert and his family.
- Samson en Gert, a humor adventure comic (1993–2005) based on the children's TV show Samson en Gert, drawn and written by Wim Swerts and Jean-Pol. Wim Swerts and Luc Van Asten
- Slache, a humor adventure comic (1939–1941) based on the vaudeville and radio sketch comedy character Slache, developed by comedian Marcel Antoine.
- Spring!, a humor adventure comic (2004–2007) based on the children's TV show Spring, written by Luc Morjaeu and drawn by Charel Cambré.
- De Strangers, a humor comic (1984) about the Flemish comedic band De Strangers, written by Patrick Vermeir, drawn by Dirk Stallaert.
- De avonturen van Tommeke, a humor comic (2007–2008) based on the cyclist Tom Boonen, written by Ivan Claeys and drawn by Patrick Van Oppen.
- Urbanus, a humor comic (1982) based on the popular comedian Urbanus, written by himself and drawn by Willy Linthout. It has been in continuous syndication since 1982, making it the longest-running and best-selling celebrity comic of Flanders and in the world.
- Van Rossem, a semi-satirical comic (1991–1992) based on the politician and economist Jean-Pierre Van Rossem who also wrote the scripts. The drawings were made by Erik Meynen.
- Vertongen & Co, a humor comic (2011), based on the children's TV show Vertongen & Co, written by Hec Leemans, drawn by Luc Van Asten and Wim Swerts.
- W817, a humor comic (2003–2011) based on the children's TV show W817, written by Hec Leemans and Tom Bouden and drawn by Luc Van Asten and Wim Swerts.
- Wendy Van Wanten, a humor comic about the pin-up model Wendy Van Wanten (1992), written by Tony Beirens and drawn by Yurg.
- X!NK, an adventure comic (2004–2006) based on the music band X!nk, written and drawn by Mario Boon.
- Zappy Max, a humor comic (1959–1960), based on the popular radio presenter Zappy Max, written and drawn by Maurice Tillieux.
- Zornik, a humor comic (2005) about the Belgian rock band Zornik, written by Mario Boon and drawn by Freek van Haagen.

=== Brazil ===
- Beto Carrero, a comic based on cowboy and theme park owner Beto Carrero, drawn by Eugênio Colonnese.
- Fuzarca e Torresmo, a comic based on the popular clowns duo of the same name, drawn by Eduardo Barbosa.
- Gugu Liberato, a comic based on actor, singer and TV presenter Gugu Liberato, drawn by Watson Portela.
- Ronaldinho Gaucho, a sports comic (2006) based on association football player Ronaldinho Gaucho, drawn by Mauricio de Sousa (of Monica's Gang fame). The comic also inspired an animated TV series, Ronaldinho Gaucho's Team (2011).
- Rocky Lane, a comics series based on U.S. western actor Rocky Lane, drawn by Primaggio Mantovi.
- Sergio Mallandro, a humor comic based on the popularity of the Brazilian TV host Sergio Mallandro, drawn by Paulo Borges.
- Mestre Kim, a comic based on taekwondo expert Mestre Kim, drawn by Eugênio Colonnese.
- Senninha, a motorsports comics by Rogério Martins and Ridaut Dias Jr., based on legendary Brazilian motor racer Ayrton Senna. It was first published before his tragic death and kept being published for several years afterwards.
- Os Trapalhões, a humor comic based on the popularity of the Brazilian comedy team Os Trapalhões, drawn by Paulo Borges and Watson Portela.
- Turma do Lambe-Lambe, a comics series based on the eponymous children's TV show, made by the show's creator, Daniel Azulay, himself.

=== Canada ===
- Fous Comme Brac, a 1950s humor comic based on the radio show Fous Comme Brac, drawn by Galiana.
- Juliette Béliveau, a 1950-1954 gag comic starring actress Juliette Béliveau, drawn by Dick Lucas.
- Penny's Diary by Doris Slater, based on the radio show of the same name.
- Sergeant Renfrew by Dave Broadfoot and Olga Urbansky, a humor comic based on the eponymous comedy character by Dave Broadfoot.
- Willie Lamothe, a comic strip based on country singer Willie Lamothe, drawn by Charles Brunet.
- Zézette, a comic based on a popular radio show of the same name, drawn by Paul St-Jean.

=== Costa Rica ===
- Las Figonas de Paso Ancho, humor comics series based on the play and TV series by Samuel Rovinski, drawn by Hugo Díaz Jiménez.

=== Croatia ===
- Mendo Mendović, based on the popular children's puppet TV series, drawn by Bordo.

=== Finland ===
- Lordi, based on the rock band Lordi. The stories are written by their frontman Tomi Putaansuu, while Sami Kivelä provided artwork.

=== France ===
- Les Bario, based on the clown ensemble Les Bario, by Jean Ache.
- Les Cinq Sous de Lavarède, a 1939 text comic based on the film Les Cinq Sous de Lavarède (1938) starring Fernandel. The comic was written and drawn by Pellos.
- Fais Pas Ci, Fais Pas Ça, a 2012 humor comic based on the TV show Fais pas ci, fais pas ça, drawn by Philippe Bercovici and written by Dal.
- Ploum, a 1925-1927 adventure comic, based on Italian-American comedian Monty Banks, drawn by Louis Forton.
- Signé Furax, based on the popular radio play Signé Furax, drawn by Henry Blanc.
- Les Aventures d'Ulysse, a comic strip based on the 1977 children's TV show Le Club d'Ulysse, drawn by Pierre-Yves Gabrion.
- Les Aventures de Zaza, a comic based on Zaza, the real-life dog of actress Dany Saval and her husband (and TV host) Michel Drucker, scripted by Saval herself and drawn by Jean-Pierre Gibrat.
- Zinedine Zidane, a 2005 comic about football player Zinedine Zidane by Alexis Nolent, Marco Venanzi and Michel Pierret.

=== Germany ===
- Die Geschichte vom General Hindenburg (1915), a propaganda comic about Paul von Hindenburg, drawn by Arpad Schmidhammer.

=== Italy ===
- Abbott & Costello, 1940s comics based on the Hollywood comedy duo Abbott & Costello, drawn by Dino Attanasio, among others.
- Cico e Pallina, a late 1930s, early 1940s gag comic, based on two characters from the radio show Terziglio. The series is notable for having been drawn by Federico Fellini, long before he became a famous film director.
- La Cicciolina, a 1980s erotic comics series by Giovanni Romanini and Lucio Filippucci, based on Hungarian-Italian porn actress and politician La Cicciolina.
- Criche e Croc, 1940s comics based on the Hollywood comedy duo Laurel & Hardy, drawn by Dino Attanasio and Andrea Da Passano, among others.
- La Genesi di Freak, a 2008-2009 comics series by Roberto Antoni, Stefano Ianne and Marcello Albano based on Roberto "Freak" Antoni himself, lead singer of the comedy punk band Skiantos.
- Roberto & C., a 1981 comic by Enrico Borgatti and Sergio Corteggi about actor and comedian Roberto Benigni.

=== Mexico ===
- Cantinflas, a photo comic (1939) about the iconic Mexican comedian Cantinflas, made by Héctor Daniel Falcón.
- Santo, el Enmascarado de Plata, a superhero comic (1952) based on the legendary Mexican wrestler El Santo, written by José Guadalupe Cruz.

=== The Netherlands ===
- AbsolutLee, based on the popular singer Lee Towers, written and drawn by Rob Derks. It was eventually cancelled because Towers had not given any permission for the work.
- André van Duin, a gag-a-day comic (1975) about the famous comedian André van Duin, scripted by himself and drawn by Fred Julsing. In the 1980s a similar humor comic was made, but with a different artist: Toon van Driel.
- Bakken aan de bar, a gag-a-day comic strip (1971) based on the popularity of the Dutch satirical shows De Fred Haché Show and Barend is weer bezig. It was drawn by the main actors themselves: Harry Touw and IJf Blokker.
- Bart de Graaff, a humor comic based on Dutch TV presenter Bart de Graaff, written and drawn by Rudi Jonker.
- Bassie en Adriaan, a children's humor-and-adventure comic (1983–1985) based on the popular children's duo Bassie en Adriaan, written by Aad van Toor (who plays Adriaan) and drawn by Frans Verschoor.
- Billie Ritchie en Zijn Ezel, a humor comic book by David Bueno de Mesquita about Scottish film comedian Billie Ritchie, which was the first Dutch celebrity comic ever.
- Coentje, a comic strip about the mascot of association football club Feyenoord, written by Martin Lodewijk, Jan Booister and drawn by Minck Oosterveer.
- Floris, a newspaper comic strip based on the TV series Floris, written by Gerard Soeteman and drawn by Gerrit Stapel.
- Jan Cremer Superstar, a 1967 comic strip about novelist Jan Cremer, drawn by Theo van den Boogaard for an edition of the Jan Cremer Krant.
- Jenny van As, a comic strip about tour guide Jenny van As, written and drawn by Richard Bijloo.
- Juul Deeldert, a comic strip based on jazz poet Jules Deelder, illustrated by Vick Debergh.
- Hermanus, a celebrity comic based on comedian and musician Herman van Veen, portrayed as his clown character. The series was drawn by Jan Bart Dieperink.
- Made in Dollland, a 2010 humor comic based on Dutch transvestite Dolly Bellefleur. It is drawn by Wilbert van der Steen and written by Bellefleur.
- Meneer Bres, a 1998 humor comic based on panelist Henk Bres in the talk show Het Lagerhuis, made by Richard and Aad Bijloo.
- Meneer Van Looij, a humor comic based on an advertising character for insurance company Reaal. It was written by Hanco Kolk and drawn by Eric Heuvel.
- Nick & Simon, a humor comic based on the singing duo Nick & Simon, drawn by Comicup Studio and written by Jos Beekman, Frank Jonker, Thom Roep, Bas Schuddeboom and Ruud Straatman.
- Ome Henk, based on the comedy records by Frank van der Plas, drawn by Leo de Veld.
- Ome Keesje, a humor comic based on the radio character Kees Mulder from the popular radio play De Familie Mulder, written by the actor himself, Willem van Cappellen, and drawn by Henk Zwart.
- Oppassen!!!, a humor comic (1997) based on the popular Dutch comedy series Oppassen!, written and drawn by Bert Witte. A notable aspect about this comic was that all the characters were anthropomorphized as animals.
- Piet Paulusma, based on the popular TV weather man, written and drawn by Piet Voordes.
- Pipo de Clown, based on the popular TV children's show Pipo de Clown, written by Wim Meuldijk and drawn by Jan van der Voo.
- Purno de Purno, based on the cult children's TV series, scripted by Mischa Oudwater and drawn by Leo de Veld.
- Radio Bergeijk, based on the popular radio show Radio Bergeijk, written and drawn by Jeroen de Leijer.
- Rockin' Belly, based on the lead singer of the Dutch punk band De Rockin' Belly Bende, by René Windig and Eddie de Jong. Incidentally, Windig was also the harmonica player in this band.
- Royaal Modaal, a 2003 web comic about the Dutch royal family, drawn by Ruud Straatman.
- Sjef van Oekel, a humor comic based on the comedic character played by Dolf Brouwers, written by his script writer Wim T. Schippers and drawn by Theo van den Boogaard. The comic was notable for running more than two decades, long after the character had disappeared from television, and was even popular in English and French translations, despite the fact that the character was unknown there. But in the early 1990s Brouwers sued, causing the series to tone down its vulgar comedy and give him part of its financial share.
- Swiebertje, based on the popular children's TV series Swiebertje, drawn by Gerrit Stapel.
- Tita Tovenaar, based on the popular children's TV series Tita Tovenaar, written and drawn by Frans Piët, who is most famous as the creator of Sjors en Sjimmie.
- Toen Was Geluk Nog Heel Gewoon, based on the popular TV sitcom of the same name, written by Hanco Kolk and drawn by Eric Heuvel.
- De Wadders by Henk Tol, based on a radio play of the same name.

=== Portugal ===
- Laurel & Hardy, a local comic strip about the U.S. comedy duo Laurel & Hardy by Óskar Pinto Lobo created in the 1930s. American publishers eventually forced him to discontinue it.

=== Spain ===
- Una aventura con Félix, el amigo de los animales by Carlos Guirado, an educational comics series based on the popularity of wildlife presenter Félix Rodríguez de la Fuente.
- Charlot, a comic about Hollywood comedian Charlie Chaplin, drawn by C. Rojo for the magazine Charlot.
- La Família Sistacs, a comic strip based on the radio show La Família Sistacs, written and drawn by the show's host Valentí Castanys Borràs.
- Gaby, Fofó, Miliki y Milikito, a children's comic (1971) based on the Spanish comedy troupe Los Payasos de la Tele, drawn by Argentinean comics artist Felix Saborido.

=== Sweden ===
- Live englit Rosa, a 2003-2008 comic series, scripted by Måns Gahrton and Johan Unenge, based on the Swedish drama series of the same name .
- Osynliga Klubben, a 1959 comic book series by Torvald Sundbaum based on the Swedish radio series of the same name.

=== United Kingdom ===
- Abbott & Costello, comics about the Hollywood comedy duo Abbott & Costello, written and drawn by Walter Bell, George William Wakefield and Norman Yendell Ward.
- The Big Yin, a gag-a-day comic (1973–1977) starring comedian Billy Connolly and the cartoonist who drew it, Malky McCormick.
- Bootsie and Snudge, a humor comic based on the TV sitcom Bootsie and Snudge, drawn by Bill Titcombe.
- Britain's Brightest Boy (1955–1961), a gag-a-day comic about comedian Benny Hill, drawn and written by Reg Parlett.
- Charlie Chaplin, a humor comic (1914), based on film comedian Charlie Chaplin, drawn by Bertie Brown. and later Freddie Adkins. Other artists who have drawn similar gag-a-day comics about Chaplin are Freddie Crompton in 1916 (who also made one about Chaplin's brother Syd Chaplin), Wally Robertson and Reg Parlett in 1932.
- Chester Conklin, The Cheerful Chappie, a humor comic (1932) based on film comedian Chester Conklin, drawn by Harry Parlett.
- The Comical Capers of Billie Reeves, the Scream of the Screen (1916), a humor comic about musical hall star and film comedian Billie Reeves, written and drawn by Louis Briault.
- Crossroads, a daily drama comic (1972–1973), based on the soap opera Crossroads, written and drawn by Alfred Mazure.
- Dad's Army, a 1973 humor comic based on the TV sitcom Dad's Army, drawn by Bill Titcombe.
- Dan Leno's Journal, a magazine (1898–1899) based on the popularity of music hall comedian Dan Leno, who also wrote the gags. The drawings were made by Tom Browne. Frank Holland also made The Leno Kids for the same magazine, which is the first juvenile version of a celebrity comic in history.
- The Dickie Henderson Family, a humor comic based on the popular TV comedian Dickie Henderson, drawn by Bill Titcombe.
- Film Fun, an entire magazine (1920–1962) featuring comics about film actors and comedians.
- Gary Glitter, a humor comic about pop singer Gary Glitter, drawn by Adam Weller.
- Harry Hill's Real Life Adventures in TV Land, a humor comic (2010–2011) about comedian Harry Hill, written by Sean Baldwin, Duncan Scott and drawn by Nigel Parkinson
- The Larkins, a gag-a-day comic (1960) based on the popular sitcom The Larkins, written and drawn by Alfred Mazure.
- Laurel & Hardy, comics about the Hollywood comedy duo Laurel & Hardy, written and drawn by John McClusky, George William Wakefield and Terence Wakefield, among others.
- Little Tich, a humor comic (1916) based on vaudeville star Little Tich, drawn by Alex Akerbladh.
- Lloyd Hamilton, a humor comic (1920) about film star Lloyd Hamilton, drawn by Herbert Sydney Foxwell.
- The Magic Roundabout, a comic based on The Magic Roundabout (the English translation of the French TV show Le Manège Enchanté), drawn by Gordon Hutchings.
- Ovaltiney's Own Comic, a comics series and entire magazine, based on the radio show Ovaltiney's Concert Party, drawn by artists like Harry Banger, Bert Hill, S.K. Perkins, G. Larkman and Harry Hemsley.
- Radio Fun, an entire magazine (1938–1961) featuring comics about radio actors and comedians.
- Robbie Rebel, a humor comic (2002–2008) based on pop singer Robbie Williams, drawn by Ken H. Harrison.
- Rolf Harris and Coojibear, a children's comic based on The Rolf Harris Show, drawn by Philip Mendoza.
- Sooty, based on the TV puppet show Sooty, drawn by Tony Hart and later Gordon Hutchings.
- The Telegoons, a humor comic (1963–1964) based on the TV puppet series The Telegoons, drawn by Bill Titcombe.
- The British girls' magazine Valentine featured several comics based on pop musicians. One of the artists who drew them was Carlos Freixas.
- Watch Out Beagle's About, a humor comic (1991), based on the TV show Beadle's About starring an anthropomorphic version of host Jeremy Beadle. It was drawn by Anthony Hutchings.

=== United States ===
- Abbott and Costello, a comics franchise based on comedy duo formed by radio and movie stars Bud Abbott and Lou Costello. Stories were written and drawn by, among others, Mort Drucker, Eric Peters (Erich Gold), Lily Renée and Charles W. Winter.
- The Adventures of Bob Hope, a humor comic (1950–1968) about comedian Bob Hope, written by Arnold Drake, drawn by Neal Adams, Owen Fitzgerald and Bob Oksner.
- Bettie Page Comics, a 1996 one-shot comic published by Dark Horse Comics and illustrated by Cary Grazzini, Dave Stevens and Jamie S. Rich, starring pin-up model Bettie Page. In 2017 a new Bettie Page comic was created by David Avallone and Colton Worely.
- Broncho Billy, a humor comic based on Hollywood western star Broncho Billy Anderson, drawn by Albert Levering.
- Bruce Lee, an action comic (1994) based on kung fu star Bruce Lee, written by Mike Baron and drawn by Val Mayerik.
- Charlie Chaplin's Comic Capers, a gag-a-day comic (1915–1917), based on film comedian Charlie Chaplin, drawn by Stuart Carothers and later Elzie C. Segar.
- The Adventures of Dean Martin and Jerry Lewis, a humor comic (1952–1957) about the comedy duo Martin & Lewis, drawn by Neal Adams and Bob Oksner.
- Dick Clark's Rock, Roll and Remember, a 1995 Sunday comic based on the radio show Dick Clark's Rock, Roll & Remember starring Dick Clark, drawn by Don Sherwood and written by Fred Bronson.
- Francis, a comic about Pope Francis, drawn by Patrick Marrin. Later followed by The Leo Chronicles, a comic about Pope Leo XIV, also by Marrin.
- Gen^{13}, issue #13C (October 1996; written by Brandon Choi, J. Scott Campbell and Jim Lee; drawn by J. Scott Campbell) features a cameo guest appearance by Anthony Robbins.
- Gene Autry, a 1952 comic strip based on country singer and western star Gene Autry, written by Gerald Geraghty, Bob Stevens and drawn by Pete Alvarado., Bert Laws, Tom Cooke, Carl Buettner, Jesse Marsh, Nick Firfires, Mo Gollub, Tillman Goodan, Mel Keefer, Tom Massey, Tony Sgroi and Hi Mankin
- Hee Haw, a humor comic based on the popular hillbilly comedy show Hee Haw, drawn by Frank Roberge.
- Inside Woody Allen, a gag-a-day comic (1976–1984) about comedian and film director Woody Allen, written by David Weinberger (among others) and drawn by Stuart Hample.
- Jackie Robinson, a 1950 comic book starring baseball player champion Jackie Robinson, written by sportswriter Charles Dexter, inked by John Jordan.
- Jay Leno Meets Spider-Man, a 2002 one-shot comic book featuring a cross-over between comedian Jay Leno and the comic book character Spider-Man, written by David Michelinie, drawn by Erik Larsen and Mike Machlan.
- Joe Martin, a newspaper comic about Joe Martin, an orang-utan featured in Hollywood films, drawn in 1920–1921 by Forest A. McGinn.
- John Wayne Comics, a comic book series based on Hollywood actor John Wayne, illustrated by artists like Al Williamson, Ben Brown and Art Helfant
- Larry, a newspaper comic about comedian Larry Semon, drawn by the artist himself.
- Late Night of the Superstars, a 1983 one-shot cross-over between TV presenter David Letterman and The Avengers, written by Roger Stern, drawn by Al Milgrom and Joe Sinnott.
- Laugh-In, a newspaper gag-a-day comic by Roy Doty, based on the TV show Rowan & Martin's Laugh-In.
- Live From New-York, it's Saturday Night!, a 1978 cross-over between the cast of the TV show Saturday Night Live and comic book character Spider-Man, written by Bob Hall, drawn by Chris Claremont.
- Mr. T, an action comic about the famous TV actor Mr. T, drawn by Neal Adams (See main article Mr. T).
- New Kids On The Block, a comic about the boyband New Kids On The Block, drawn by Ernie Colón.
- Outsiders: Wanted, a 2004 one-shot comic book featuring a cross-over between TV actor John Walsh and the comics characters The Outsiders., written by Judd Winick, drawn by Dan Jurgens, Carlos D'Anda, Karl Kerschl and Shawn Moll.
- Personality Classics (Personality Comics, 1991) – limited series of profiles of John Wayne, Marilyn Monroe, Elvis Presley, and James Dean.
- Personality Comics Presents (Personality Comics, 1991 – 1992) – comic book series of profiles of celebrities like Paulina Porizkova, Traci Lords, and Cassandra Peterson.
- Public Enemy, a comic book about the rap group Public Enemy, by Adam Wallenta.
- Roy Rogers, a 1948-1957 comic strip based on western film star Roy Rogers, drawn by Pete Alvarado, Erwin Hess and Hi Mankin.
- Savage Dragon Vol.2 #41 (September 1997) features a cameo by Elton John.
- Secret Agents (Personality Comics, 1991 – 1992) — comic limited series of profiles of James Bond actors Sean Connery, Roger Moore, and Timothy Dalton.
- Spidey Meets the President!, a 2009 Marvel Comics special written by Zeb Wells and drawn by Todd Nauck and Frank D'Armata, for the occasion of Barack Obama's inauguration as the President of the United States.
- Superman vs. Muhammad Ali, a 1978 comic book where Superman has a cross-over with boxing champion Muhammad Ali, written by Dennis O'Neil and drawn by Neal Adams.
- Teen Comics (Personality Comics, Sept. 1992 – Mar. 1993) — comic book limited series of profiles of teen idols like Shannen Doherty, Luke Perry, the cast of Melrose Place, Mark Wahlberg, Madonna, and Prince.
- The Three Stooges, a comics franchise based on comedy team formed by Moe Howard, Larry Fine, Curly Howard, Shemp Howard and Joe De Rita.
- TMNT Amazing Adventures: Carmelo Anthony Special (2016), a celebrity special story for the Amazing Adventures comic books to the 2012 Teenage Mutant Ninja Turtles TV series, featuring basketball player Carmelo Anthony.
- Tom Mix, a western comic based on cowboy actor Tom Mix, drawn by Carl Pfeufer.
- Undertaker, a comic book (1999–2000) based on professional wrestler The Undertaker, written by Beau Smith, drawn by Manny Clark.
- W.C. Fields, a 1982-1983 newspaper comic by Frank Smith and Jim Smart, based on comedian W.C. Fields. Later Fields' grandson Ronald Fields took over the script, while Fred Fredericks provided the drawings.
- The Weather, a humor/weather forecast comic (1909–1913) starring local Seattleite Robert W. Patten, drawn by John Hager.
- Weiss Cracks, a humor comic starring comedian Richard Weiss, drawn by Bart Slyp.
- Wild Man Fischer, a humor comic (1993) about folk singer Wild Man Fischer, drawn and written by J.R. Williams in the Real Stuff series.
- WWE Heroes, a comics franchise based on professional wrestling stars.
