= IJf Blokker =

Dutch musician, actor and presenter (1930–2026)

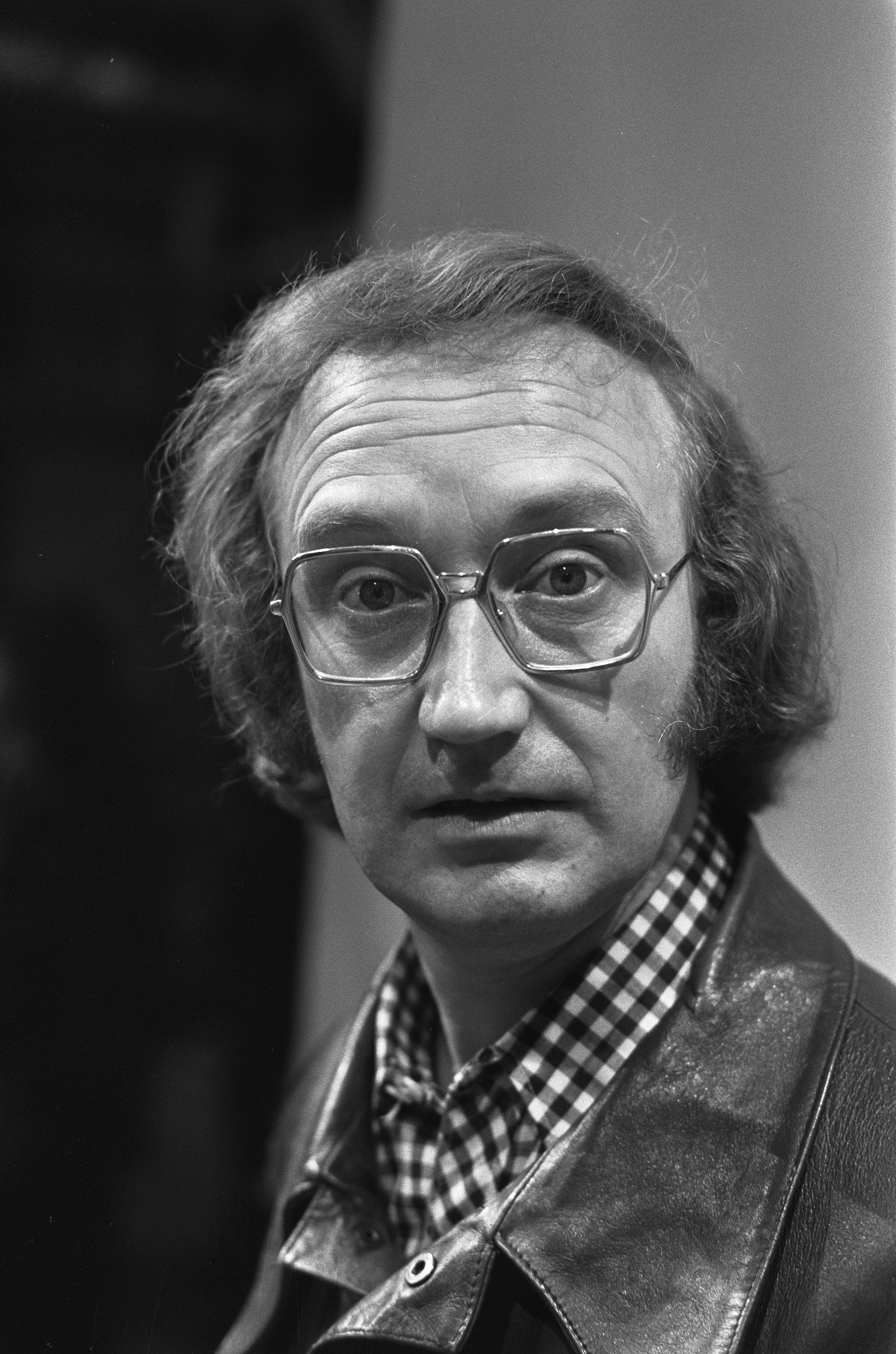
- Blokker in 1973
- Born: 2 September 1930; Den Helder, Netherlands
- Died: 10 March 2026 (aged 95); Den Helder, Netherlands
- Occupations: Actor; comic artist
- Years active: 1971–1996

IJf Blokker (2 September 1930 – 10 March 2026) was a Dutch musician, television actor and presenter. After a professional career as a drummer, he became a well-known television actor in the 1970s playing the character Barend Servet in the Wim T. Schippers-directed shows on VPRO television.

== Life and career ==
Blokker was born in Den Helder on 2 September 1930. He studied drums at the Amsterdamse Muziekschool, and worked in a number of orchestras in the Netherlands and Germany, including the Snip en Snap Revue. He was drum teacher as well; one of his students was Jan Keizer, who gained fame with BZN. Blokker became widely known in the 1970s playing the character of Barend Servet in a series of television shows: De Fred Hachéshow (1971), Barend is weer bezig (1972–1973), and Van Oekel's Discohoek (1974). These shows, conceived, written, and directed by Wim van der Linden, Wim T. Schippers, Gied Jaspars, and Ruud van Hemert and aired on VPRO, caused consternation by having naked dancers and extras, cursing actors, and absurdist humor. After the controversial scene in which Barend Servet interviewed Juliana of the Netherlands, Blokker received angry letters and phone calls, even a bomb threat. The Barend Servet character had a hit song in 1973 with the song "Waar moet dat heen, hoe zal dat gaan?" and made public appearances as late as 1981.

He had minor roles in the television shows Zeg 'ns Aaa, SamSam, Pompy de Robodoll, Seth & Fiona, and Filmpje!, and in the 1990 television production of the Herman Heijermans play Eva Bonheur. In the 1980s he presented the VPRO nature program Puur natuur (with Adeline van Lier) and was a commentator for an AVRO program, Prijs je rijk.

Blokker died on 10 March 2026, at the age of 95.
