= De Fred Haché Show =

1971 Dutch television show

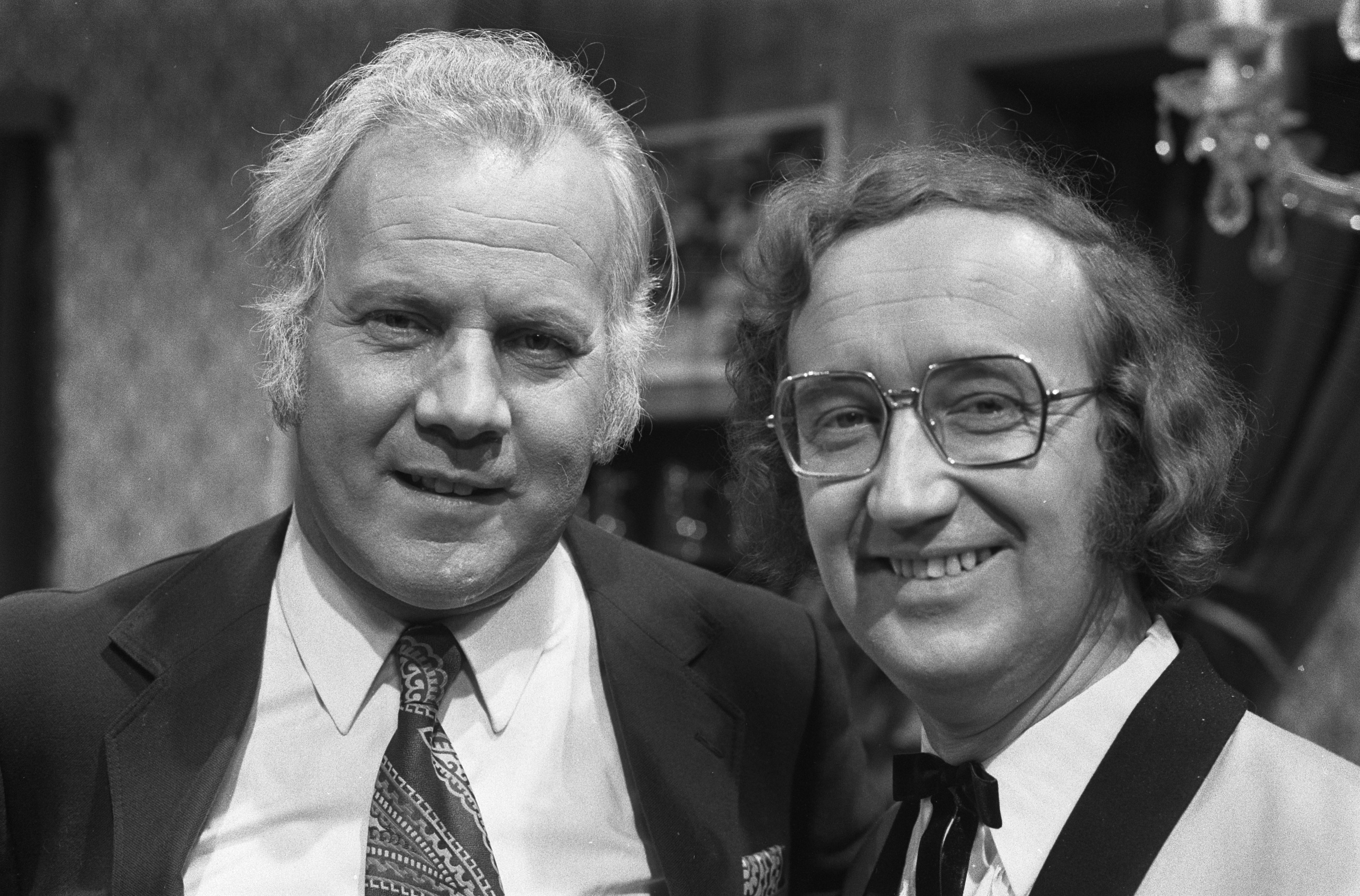
- De Fred Haché Show, 1972
- Country of origin: Netherlands
- Original language: Dutch

Original release
- Network: VPRO

De Fred Haché Show is a 1971 Dutch television show written and directed for the VPRO by Wim T. Schippers, Ruud van Hemert, Wim van der Linden, and Gied Jaspars. The show marked the return to television for Schippers, van der Linden, and Jaspars, who had been on the team that was responsible for the controversial 1967 show Hoepla, canceled after three episodes. Like its "sister show" Barend is weer bezig (1972–1973) and Van Oekel's Discohoek, it was an absurdist show with much nudity, linguistic humor, satirical skits, and illogical plot lines.

== Content ==
The show was built around two main characters, Fred Haché (Harry Touw) and his assistant Barend Servet (IJf Blokker), with cameos by Kees van Kooten, Wim de Bie, poet Simon Vinkenoog, and Dolf Brouwers, who would return as the regular Sjef van Oekel character in Barend is weer bezig and Van Oekel's Discohoek. Schippers tendency to treat serious matters in irreverent fashion is exemplified in the interview with God, which Jan Blokker, then director of VPRO television, had cut from the show: apparently the show had at some point been unable to get more guests, and Schippers thought God would make a good guest for an interview with Fred Haché, who asked him if He didn't think it unreasonable that people who lived their life carelessly "could get into heaven by converting just before death comma God?" ("Comma" was one of Haché's catchwords.) God promised to consider it. The fragment is lost, though the audio was saved.

== In other media ==
Touw and Blokker personally adapted the TV show into a gag-a-day comic strip called "Bakken aan de bar" ("Jokes at the counter").

== DVD release and controversy ==
The series was released on DVD in November 2007, with the four Sad Movies by Schippers, Wim van der Linden, and Willem de Ridder as a bonus. One of the show's scenes, though, was removed after protests by Willeke van Ammelrooy, who had (against her will) acquired a reputation as a "sex kitten" because she had appeared nude on screen (in Mira by Fons Rademakers and in movies by Wim Verstappen and Pim de la Parra). In the De Fred Haché Show she played a scene in which Fred Haché and Barend Servet crash through a ceiling and land in the bathtub of the floor below, where van Ammelrooy's character is taking a bath. Van Ammelrooy, who had been trying to shed her image and hated having to do the scene, fought for ten years to have the scene removed from the collection, even a pixelated version.
