= Het laatste nippertje =

Het laatste nippertje ("Just in time") is a 2011 play by Dutch writer, artist, and television director Wim T. Schippers. It premiered in the Stadsschouwburg in Amsterdam, and was a co-production with Titus Tiel Groenestege, Titus Muizelaar, and Kees Hulst. The play received less favorable reviews than earlier plays by Schippers; Martijn Kardol, writing for CultuurBewust, commented that it lacked the progressive and groundbreaking qualities of Schippers' 1986 production Going to the Dogs, not rising above flat and repetitive humor, and that the actors lacked the impeccable timing necessary for such a production.
