= Dolf Brouwers =

Dutch comedian and singer (1912–1997)

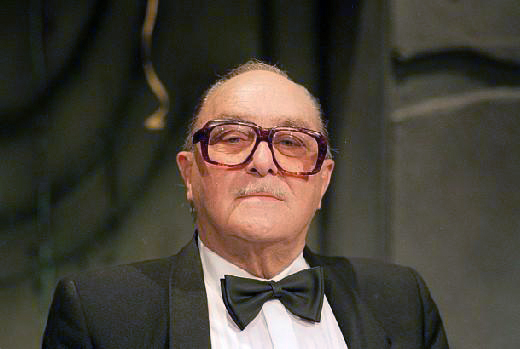
Dolf Brouwers as Sjef van Oekel

Dolf Brouwers (31 August 1912 – 23 September 1997) was a Dutch comedian, singer, and television actor who rose to fame late in life playing the character Sjef van Oekel in the 1970s satirical television shows aired on VPRO, written and directed by Wim T. Schippers, Ruud van Hemert, Gied Jaspars, and Wim van der Linden.

== Biography ==
Born in Utrecht in 1912, Brouwers grew up in The Hague and held various jobs including hairdresser, travel guide, and vacuum cleaner salesman. He loved operetta and tried without success for a career as a singer, having only one minor hit. In 1972 he was discovered when he auditioned as an extra for the Wim T. Schippers television show De Fred Hachéshow (he was friends with the show's lead actor, Harry Touw), and quickly rose to prominence. Schippers created the character Sjef van Oekel for Brouwers, who returned in two later Schippers shows, Barend is weer bezig (1972–1973) and Van Oekel's Discohoek (1974).

The van Oekel character was ancillary in De Fred Hachéshow and Barend is weer bezig, both of which had Barend Servet as the lead, but central in Van Oekel's Discohoek, where he played the host of a music show on television that parodied popular music programs of the era. In Het is weer zo laat! (1974) Brouwers, who was 67 at the time, plays Waldo van Dungen, a bumbling and chaotic nightclub owner. Formerly a waiter at the club, van Dungen had married a rich admirer, Gé Braadslee, who buys it for him; he renames it Waldolala.

As van Oekel and van Dungen, Brouwers was a striking character with a large television presence, and equipped with large glasses, a tuxedo, and a pencil moustache. His sense of humor corresponded with Schippers'; both were extraordinarily fond of and gifted in creating puns and using unorthodox and humorous syntax and diction.

Brouwers recorded many Schippers-penned and other songs, most of which comic and dramatic. With Manke Nelis he recorded "Vis wordt duur betaald" (#46 in the Dutch charts in 1988), but his best known song is probably "Vette jus" ("[Sauerkraut with] greasy gravy"), a dish still associated with him in a song that is little more than a list of Dutch dishes. The song was first performed on the 1974 Christmas special for Barend is weer bezig; it was written by Schippers, Gied Jaspars, and Clous van Mechelen.

Whether van Oekel was just used or also abused by Schippers and others was the topic of a 2004 theater production. According to Hein Janssen, writing in de Volkskrant, it is certainly true that Brouwers jumped at the opportunity to become a celebrity, but the extent to which Schippers and the other writers and directors pushed Brouwers (he balked, for instance, at having to simulate sex with an inflatable doll) is questionable.

== Discography ==
=== Charting singles ===
["Oei, oei" credited as "Sjef van Oekel", all others as "Dolf Brouwers"]

- "Oei, oei, dat was lekker!" (1980, peaked at #23, 5 weeks in the charts)
- "Oh wat is het toch fijn om gelukkig te zijn" (1985, #46, 2 weeks)
- "Al die rotzooi in de Rijn" (1988, #27, 7 weeks)
- "De vis wordt duur betaald" (with Manke Nelis) (1988, #46, 8 weeks)
