= Watch Out Beagle's About =

British celebrity comics comic strip

Watch Out Beagle's About was a British celebrity comics comic strip which appeared in the British comic book magazine Buster from 14 September 1991 until 28 December 1991. It was drawn by Anthony Hutchings.

The strip was basically a parody of the British TV show Beadle's About which was popular at the time. The main difference being that the strip was hosted by a beagle. Sometimes the pranks would back-fire.
