= Sjef van Oekel =

Dutch comedic television character

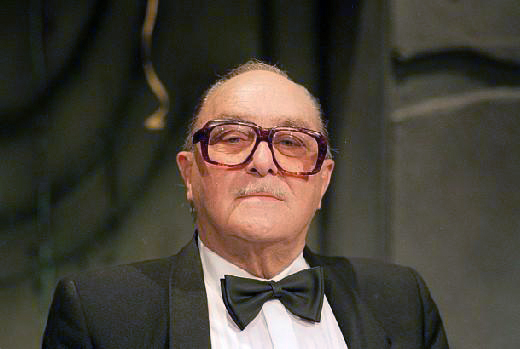
Dolf Brouwers as Sjef van Oekel.

Sjef van Oekel was a TV comedy character created by Dutch artist Wim T. Schippers and played by Dutch comedian, singer and actor Dolf Brouwers (1912–1997). Van Oekel started as a side character in De Fred Hachéshow in 1972 but became such a cult figure that he gained his own television show, Van Oekel's Discohoek, songs and even a comics series, all written by Schippers.

== Character ==
Wim T. Schippers created Sjef van Oekel in 1972 as a Belgian french fries salesman from the village Reet. Schippers had never visited Reet, but had seen the name on a company manufacturing car accessories and enjoyed the double entendre of the name ("Reet" means "crack" or "buttcrack" in Dutch). In line with his character's origin Van Oekel originally used a Flemish accent, but quickly dropped this in favor for his own Dutch accent.

Van Oekel is typically dressed in a fine black tuxedo and always talks and behaves in a refined manner, complete with archaisms. However something always went wrong during his presentations, either on the set or he himself tripped or went nauseous. Situations like these always lead to his well-known catch phrase: "Ik word niet goed!" ("I'm starting to feel not well!"). Whenever Van Oekel said this he usually used a handkerchief to clean off the sweat on his forehead. In one controversial episode he threw up in the bicycle bag of his sidekick Evert van de Pik (played by Jaap Bar), which outraged Dutch journalist Henk van der Meijden so much that he started an unsuccessful campaign to get the program banned. Other well-known catch phrases of Van Oekel were "Als het ware..." ("As it were...") and "Pardon...reeds" ("Pardon... already").

== History ==
The character made his debut in 1972, in De Fred Hachéshow, a controversial television show created by Wim T. Schippers. He later returned in two later Schippers shows, Barend is weer bezig (1972–1973) and Van Oekel's Discohoek (1974).

The van Oekel character was ancillary in De Fred Hachéshow and Barend is weer bezig, both of which had Barend Servet as the lead, but central in Van Oekel's Discohoek, where he played the host of a music show on television that parodied popular music programs of the era.

Van Oekel quickly became a cult figure with viewers. Brouwers recorded many Schippers-penned and other songs, most of which comic and dramatic. With Manke Nelis he recorded "Vis wordt duur betaald" (#46 in the Dutch charts in 1988), but his best known song is probably "Vette jus" ("[Sauerkraut with] greasy gravy"), a dish still associated with him in a song that is little more than a list of Dutch dishes. The song was first performed on the 1973 Christmas special for Barend is weer bezig; it was written by Schippers, Gied Jaspars, and Clous van Mechelen.

== Comics series ==
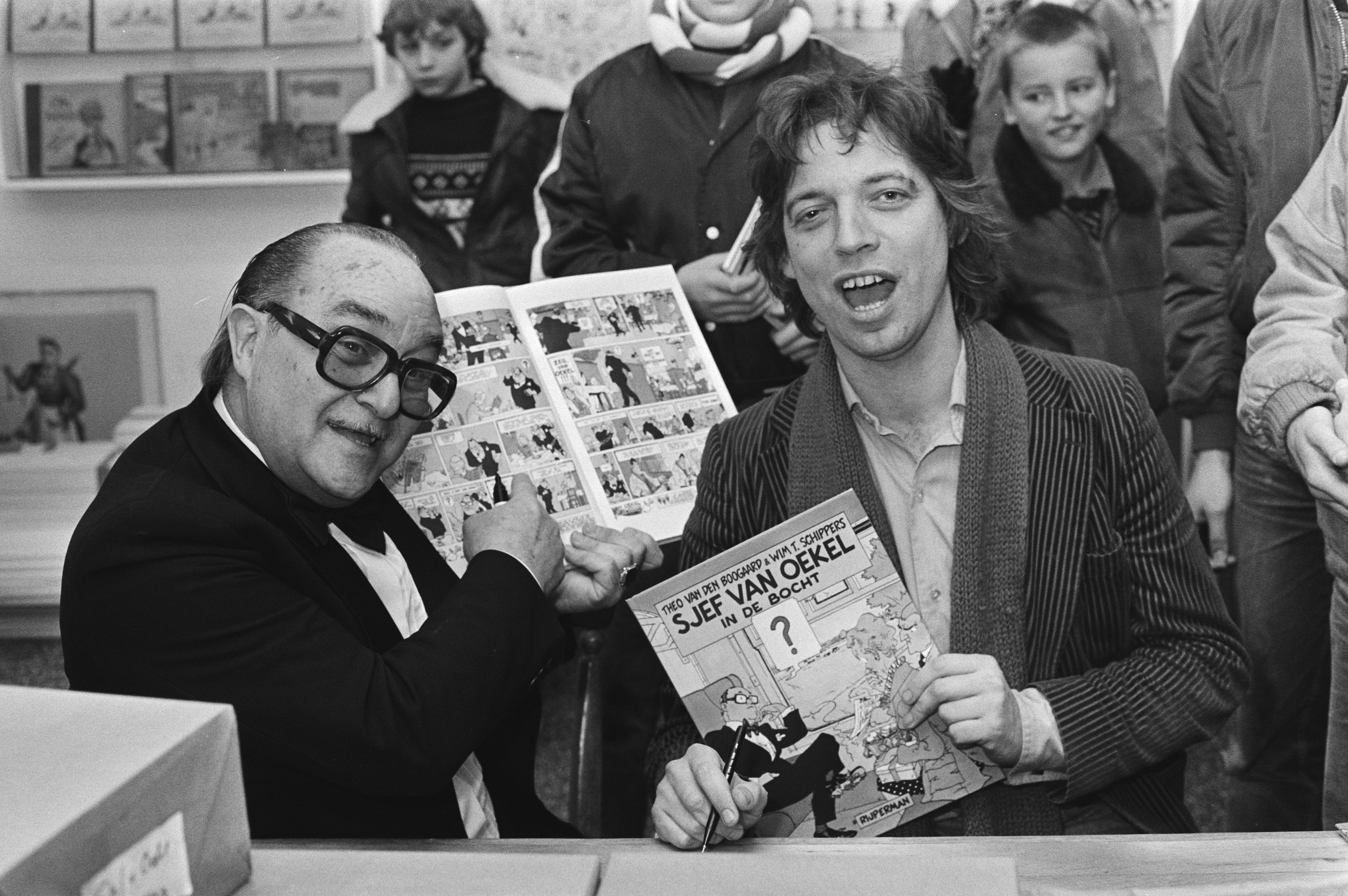
Van de Boogaard with "Sjef van Oekel" (l) at a comic album signing at the Amsterdam comic bookstore Lambiek in December 1980

In 1976 Wim T. Schippers and Theo van den Boogaard drew a celebrity comic series based on the character. Many stories and gags feature Van Oekel embarrassing other people or meeting rather eccentric and exhibitionistic people himself. Sjef van Oekel quickly became notorious for featuring very risqué subject matter, including religion, pornography, pedophilia, prostitution, vulgar language, and so on. The stories were published in De Nieuwe Revu and sold well enough to be translated in French ("Léon Van Oukel", later "Léon La Terreur"), German ("Julius Patzenhofer", later "Leo, der Terrorist"), Danish and Spanish.

== Brouwers' personal backlash ==
Van Oekel made a few media appearances in the late 1970s and early 1980s, but by 1984 this came to a halt too. Brouwers felt increasingly exploited by Schippers, especially regarding the comics series. In 1989 he dragged Schippers and Van den Boogaard to court because the comics frequently portrayed him in vulgar situations without him earning a penny from it. The judge ruled in favor of Brouwers and decided that the series could continue, but the character was no longer allowed to be portrayed in "obscene or pornographic situations". A financial settlement was also agreed on.

Whether van Oekel was just used or also abused by Schippers and others was the topic of a 2004 theater production. According to Hein Janssen, writing in de Volkskrant, it is certainly true that Brouwers jumped at the opportunity to become a celebrity, but the extent to which Schippers and the other writers and directors pushed Brouwers (he balked, for instance, at having to simulate sex with an inflatable doll) is questionable.
