= Van Lier =

Van Lier is a surname first found in the Netherlands. Spelling variations of this family name include: Leer, Lier, Liere, Lierr, Lierre, Liers, Lieres, Lierrs, Lierres, de Lier, van Lier and many more.

Some of the first settlers in the New World of this family name or some of its variants were:

- Jan Evertsz van Lier, who arrived in New Netherland in 1664;

Notable people with the surname include:

- Adeline van Lier (born 1956), Dutch television and radio presenter
- Anita van Lier (born 1954), Dutch cricketer
- Coenraad van Lier (1836–1903), Suriname physician and politician
- Josephine van Lier (born 1968), Dutch cellist
- Norm Van Lier (1947–2009), American basketball player and broadcaster
