= Lambiek =

Comic book store and art gallery in Amsterdam, Netherlands

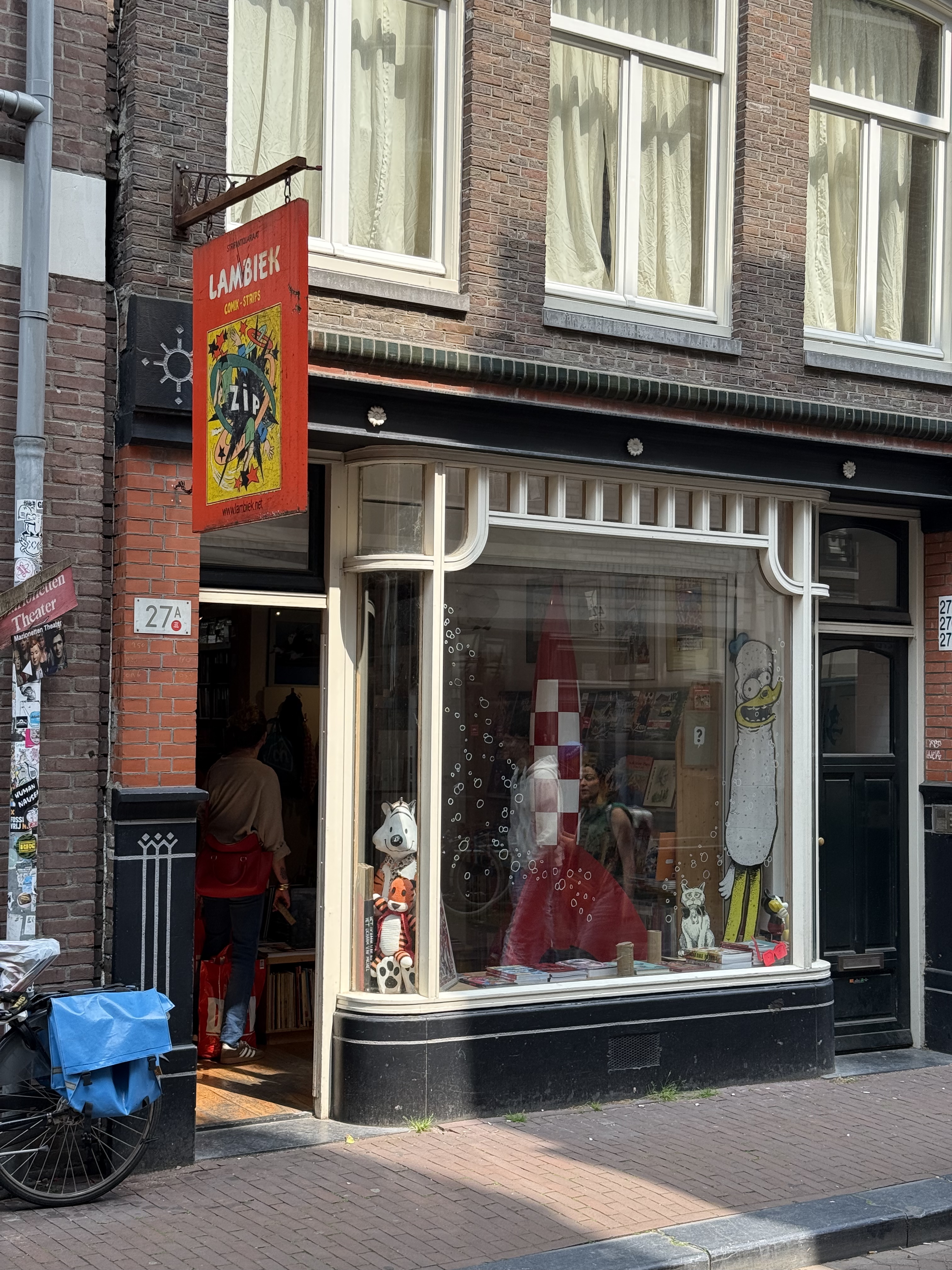
- Type: Comic book store, art gallery
- Industry: Comic books, art
- Founded: November 8, 1968; 57 years ago
- Founder: Kees Kousemaker
- Headquarters: Amsterdam, Netherlands
- Key people: Kees Kousemaker and Evelien Willems; Klaas Knol; Bas Van der Zee; Boris Kousemaker
- Products: Comic books
- Website: lambiek.net

Galerie Lambiek is a Dutch comic book store and art gallery in Amsterdam, founded on November 8, 1968 by Kees Kousemaker (Steenbergen, January 25, 1942 – Bussum, April 27, 2010 (aged 68)). His son Boris Kousemaker has been the owner since 2007. From 1968 to 2015, it was located in the Kerkstraat, but in November 2015, the store moved to Koningsstraat 27. As of 2018, Lambiek is the oldest comics store in Europe, and the oldest worldwide still in existence.

The name "Lambiek" originated as a misspelling of the name of the comics' character Lambik, from the popular Suske & Wiske comic book series created by Belgian artist Willy Vandersteen. The logo of the shop is an image from the Suske en Wiske album Prinses Zagemeel (Princess Sawdust).

== History ==
Only two earlier comic bookstores are known to have opened their doors on the North-American continent (or anywhere else on the world for that matter) prior to the one founded by Kousemaker; George Henderson's Canadian, Toronto-based Memory Lane Books opened in May 1967, (itself a continuation of the Viking Bookshop he had already opened on another city location in the spring of 1966), followed by Gary Arlington's San Francisco Comic Book Company, which was established in April 1968 in the US namesake city, Making Lambiek the worldwide third-oldest comic book store in history. What the three stores had in common was that they all started out with a strong focus on underground comics. Memory Lane Books closed in the 1980s, however, whereas Arlington's store went defunct in 2002, leaving Lambiek as of 2023 the worldwide oldest surviving comic book store.

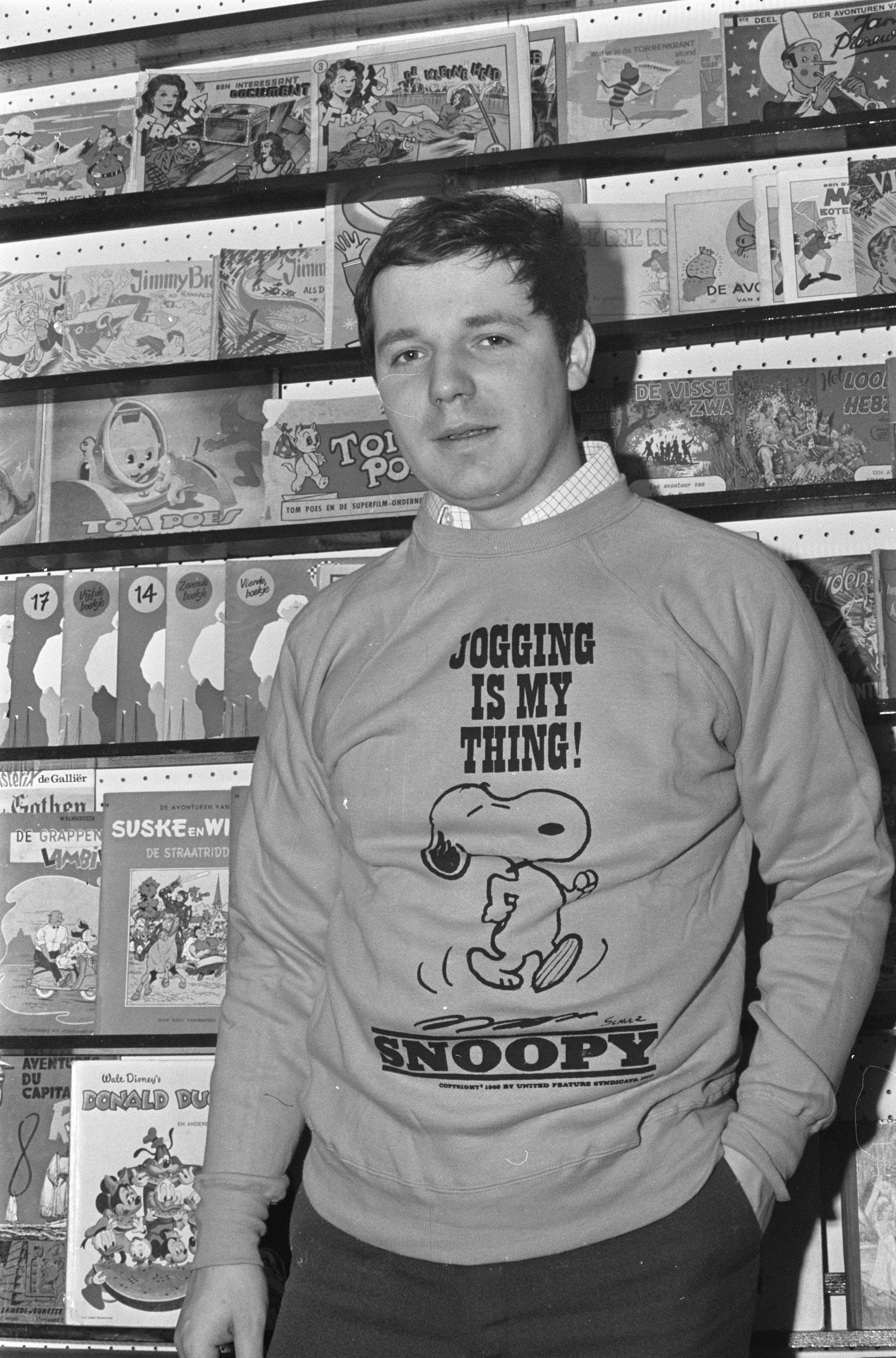
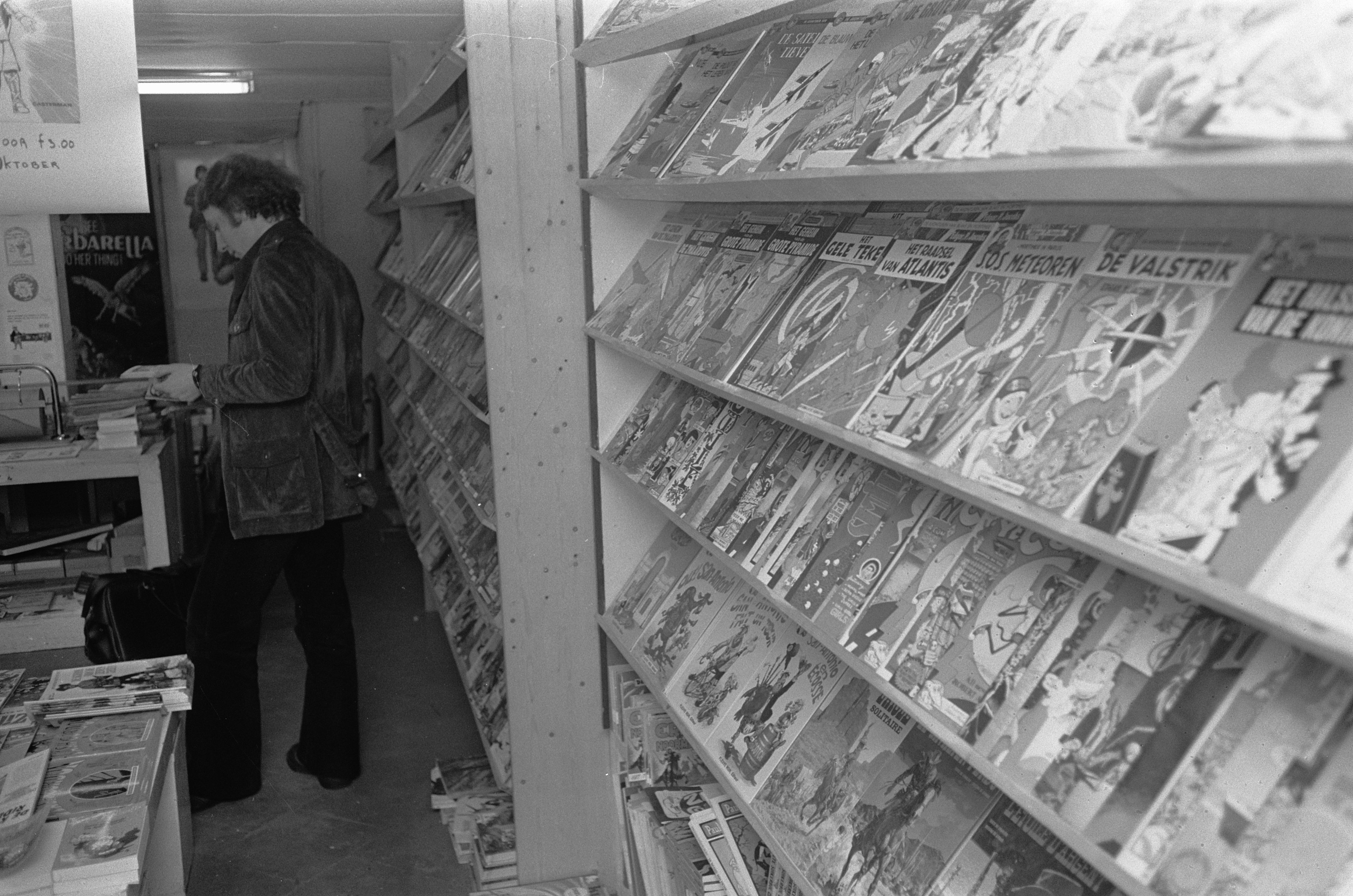
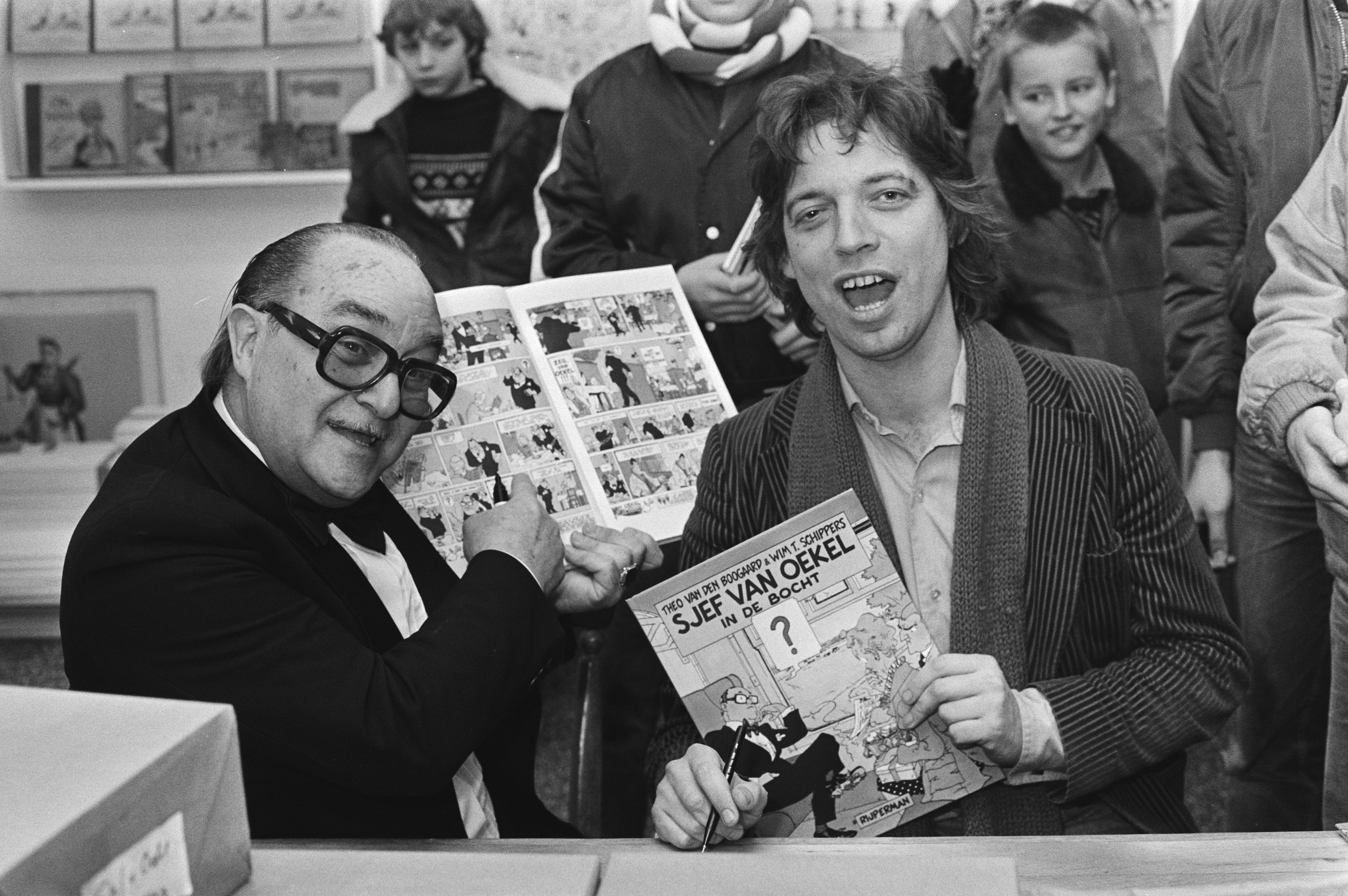
Founding owner Kousemaker in January 1968, his gallery/store in September 1973, and a December 1980 album signing by Sjef van Oekel and Theo van den Boogaard on the right.

Kees Kousemaker and his wife Evelien also published two encyclopedic books about comics, titled Strip voor Strip (1970) and Wordt Vervolgd (1979). He and Margreet de Heer also wrote the book De Nederlandse Stripgeschiedenis (2001) and De Wereld van de Nederlandse Strip (2005) about Dutch comics and their history. From 1986 on, the store gained fame by holding art exhibitions and book signings by numerous comic authors, including Robert Crumb, Will Eisner, André Franquin, Joost Swarte, Charles Burns, Chris Ware, Daniel Clowes, François Avril and Art Spiegelman.

In 2010, Lambiek's founder, Kees Kousemaker, died.

== Comiclopedia ==
Since 1 November 1999, Lambiek has also hosted the Comiclopedia, a digital encyclopaedia featuring biographies of more than 14,000 international comics authors.

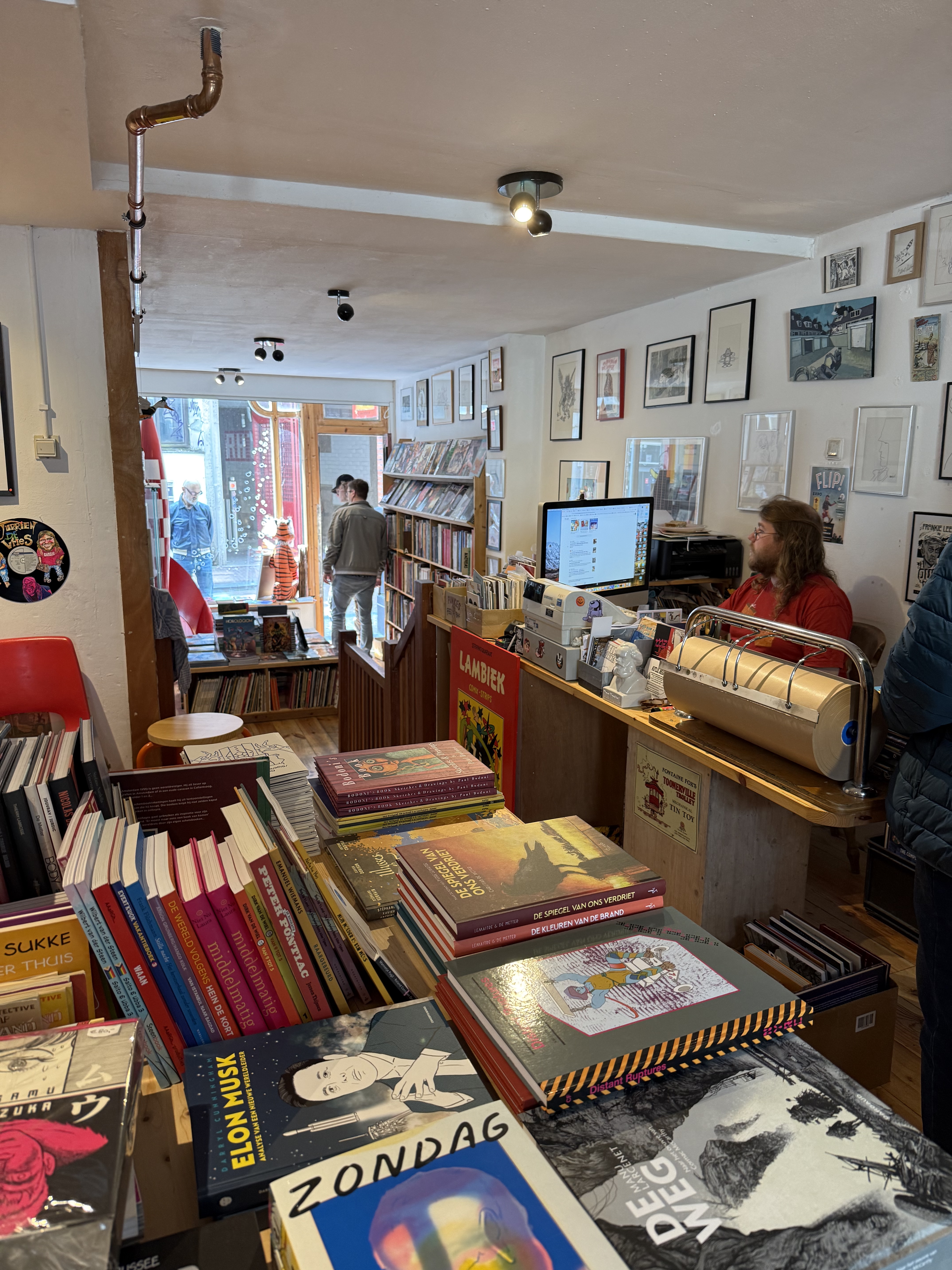
The interior of Galerie Lambiek in June 2025

== Awards ==
- In 1979, Kees Kousemaker won the Zilveren Dolfijn Award.
- Kousemaker received the Will Eisner Spirit of Comics Retailer Award in 1995.
- On 9–10 October 1999, Kousemaker won the annual P. Hans Frankfurther Prize.
- In 2006, Kousemaker was the recipient of the Order of Orange-Nassau medal from the Netherlands for his special dedication to the history of comic books.
- In 2010, Lambiek employee Klaas Knol won the Hal Foster Award for his client friendly and knowledgeable presence.
- On 8 February 2020, Bas Schuddeboom and Kjell Knudde, editors of the comics encyclopaedia website Comiclopedia, connected to Lambiek, won the annual P. Hans Frankfurther Prize, which they received on 13 November of that year.

== See also ==
- List of online encyclopedias
