= Barend is weer bezig =

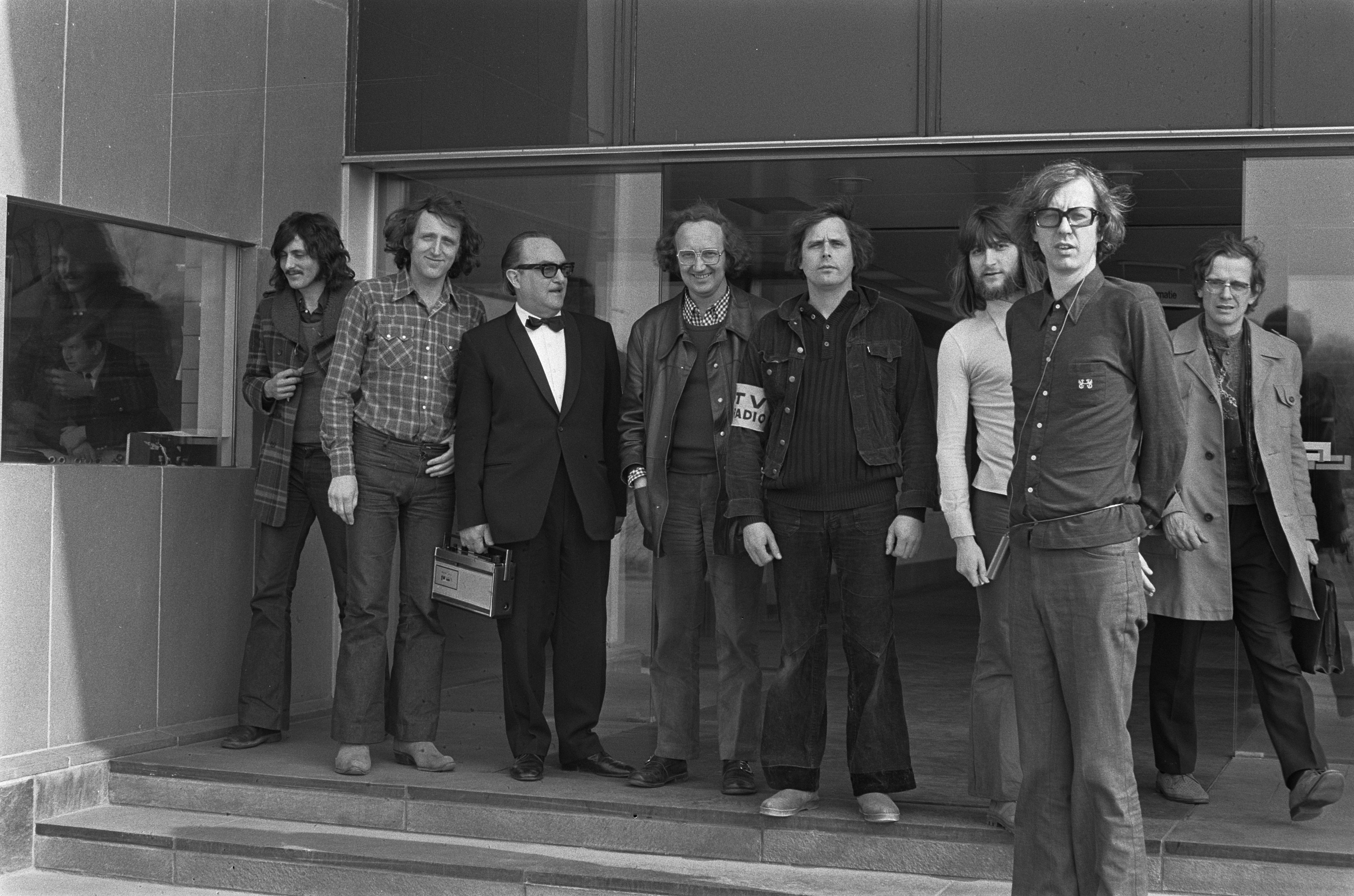
- Actors of Barend Is Weer Bezig!, 1973
- Country of origin: Netherlands
- Original language: Dutch

Original release
- Network: VPRO

Barend is weer bezig (lit. transl. Barend Does it Again) is a Dutch television show written and directed by Wim T. Schippers with Wim van der Linden, Gied Jaspars, and Ruud van Hemert and broadcast by the VPRO in 1972-1973. The show was produced by Ellen Jens. Four regular episodes and a Christmas special were made. The series caused considerable controversy, particularly because of a scene in which the then-reigning Queen Juliana of the Netherlands was mocked.

== Genesis and content ==
The show was built around the character of Barend Servet, a clumsy journalist played by IJf Blokker, who had first appeared in the 1971 TV show De Fred Haché Show. Other characters who returned from the Hachéshow were Sjef van Oekel (played by Dolf Brouwers) and Fred Haché (played by Harry Touw). In typical Wim T. Schippers fashion the show, like its predecessor, derived its comedy from low-brow humor involving silly costumes, dog turds, nudity, and chaos; it combined the trivial and banal with controversial content. To some the show appeared to be 'anti-television' (a hidden protest against TV productions being too polished and error free.) There were four episodes plus a Christmas special, Waar heb dat nou voor nodig. ("What Does It Need to be Like That Anyway?") The Christmas special was notable, especially for two songs written by Schippers and Van Mechelen for Dolf Brouwers, "Vette jus" ("Fat Gravy") and "Juliana onze vorstin" ("Juliana Our Monarch").

== Controversy and praise ==
The show provoked national controversy with a skit in which Barend Servet interviewed Juliana of the Netherlands (played by "Ria", one "RiMiCo ladies"); the queen drank sherry, and cleaned Brussels sprouts in order to pretend to feel close to the Dutch people, before throwing them in the trash or donating them to a children's home. The show rose quite a few questions in Dutch parliament about the depiction of Her Majesty the Queen. VPRO was reprimanded by the minister of culture, narrowly escaping having its broadcasting hours cut.

While there were plenty of negative reviews, one notable supporter of De Fred Haché Show and Barend is weer bezig was Frans Haks, an art historian and critic who in 1978 became the director of the Groninger Museum (where he became known and controversial for his appreciation of avant-garde art). In the Museumjournaal, a well-established magazine for art and art history, he praised the show and said that its apparent clumsiness and triviality in "een geprofileerd and consistent kunstbegrip", "a well-shaped and consistent conception of art". His article also provoked strong reactions: the issue sold out quickly, at the same time that some readers canceled their subscriptions.

== Main cast ==
- IJf Blokker - Barend Servet
- Harry Touw - Otto Kolkvet
- Dolf Brouwers - Sjef van Oekel
- Cor Brak - Gerrit Dekzeil
- Elisabeth Roelink, Mieke van de Sande, and Bertina Maas - the RiMiCo ladies

== DVD release ==
The four episodes and the Christmas special were released on DVD as part 3 of Wim T. Schippers' Televisiepraktijken - sinds 1962; bonus material includes and the television plays De ondergang van de Onan (April 1976) and Echo's uit het Alpendal (August 1976).

== Comic strip ==
In 1971 the TV show was adapted into a celebrity comic, Bakken aan de bar, drawn by the main actors themselves: Harry Touw and IJf Blokker.
