= Army Brats =

1984 film

- Theatrical release poster
- Directed by: Ruud van Hemert
- Written by: Thys Ockersen; Ruud van Hemert
- Produced by: Haig Balian; Chris Brouwer
- Starring: Peter Faber; Geert de Jong; Akkemay Elderenbos; Erik Koningsberger
- Cinematography: Theo van de Sande
- Edited by: Ton de Graaff
- Music by: Ruud van Hemert
- Production company: Movies Filmproductions
- Distributed by: Meteor Film / The Movies (Netherlands); Warner Bros. (International)
- Release date: 8 February 1984
- Running time: 101 minutes
- Country: Netherlands
- Language: Dutch
- Box office: 1 million admissions (Netherlands)

Army Brats (Dutch: Schatjes), also known as Darlings, is a 1984 Dutch comedy film directed by Ruud van Hemert. The film is a dark comedy, featuring guerrilla warfare between disturbed parents (Peter Faber and Geert de Jong) and their disruptive children. This only leads to chaos and mayhem. The film drew 1 million visitors, making it one of the most successful Dutch films ever. The film was selected as the Dutch entry for the Best Foreign Language Film at the 57th Academy Awards, but was not accepted as a nominee. A sequel, Mama is Boos!, was released in 1986.

== Cast ==
- Peter Faber as John Gisberts
- Geert de Jong as Danny Gisberts
- Akkemay Elderenbos as Madelon Gisberts
- Frank Schaafsma as Thijs Gisberts
- Pepijn Somer as Jan–Julius Gisberts
- Olivier Somer as Valentijn Gisberts
- Rijk de Gooijer as Pete Stewart
- Erik Koningsberger as Dennis
- Arie van Riet as John Wyatt

== Production ==
In 2022, Erik Koningsberger, the actor who stars with Akkemay Elderenbos in the controversial shower scene, said he didn't know at the time that the actress was only 14.

== See also ==
- List of Dutch submissions for the Academy Award for Best Foreign Language Film
- List of submissions to the 57th Academy Awards for Best Foreign Language Film
