= Going to the Dogs =

1986 play by Wim T. Schippers

Going to the Dogs is a 1986 play by Dutch writer, artist, and television director Wim T. Schippers. It premiered on 19 September to a sell-out audience in the Stadsschouwburg in Amsterdam, with six German Shepherds, allegedly trained as actors by the Amsterdam police, as the performers. The play provoked national and international attention, and even drew protest from an animal rights group.

== Background ==
Schippers, who had gained a reputation as an artist creating unusual works of visual art in the 1960s (for instance, his Pindakaasvloer consisted of a floor covered in peanut butter), conceived of the idea for the play in the early 1970s, and explained that the six dogs had been acquired as puppies and had received acting lessons from the Amsterdam police. The real spectacle, he said, was "the curious fact that people will actually come to the theatre to watch dogs eating, barking, urinating, fighting, sleeping and playing".

== Plot and acting ==
The plot was called "familiar" in one review, and was described as "a Byzantine love story set in a rambling country manor": a young girl introduces her boyfriend to her parents, and plays up emotions like "love, jealousy, curiosity, and parental worries". The actors were prompted by "pieces of meat and cookies thrown into [sic] the appropriate direction". About the meaning of the dogs' acting, Schippers said that humans act on stage but "dogs remain normal. Thinking about that gives you a new perspective on the theater".

== Reception ==
The play attracted national and international attention both before and after its sold-out 19 September 1986 premiere and provoked much controversy; questions were asked in Dutch parliament about why such an absurdist play received government subsidies. Not all were positive: reportedly some people (including the theater manager) left the performance early in dismay, and an action group, "The Underdog", protested against what they saw as animal abuse.

A performance of the play was released in 2008 on the two DVD set of Schippers' television drama series Op zoek naar Yolanda (1984), along with the television productions Sans rancune (1987) and De bruine jurk (1988). In 2011, lead actress Ilja van Vinkeloord (1981–1996) was honored with a portrait in the Stadschouwburg's gallery, hung among portraits of such veteran Dutch actors as Kitty Courbois, Joop Admiraal, and Mary Dresselhuys.
