= Pindakaasvloer =

Artwork by Wim T. Schippers

Peanut-Butter Platform (Dutch: Pindakaasvloer, pronounced [ˈpɪndaːkaːsˌfluːr]) is an artwork by Dutch artist Wim T. Schippers. It consists of a floor covered with peanut butter and nothing else.

== Background ==
The idea for Peanut-Butter Platform evolved from some of Schippers' earlier work. He installed two floor sculptures in a 1962 exhibit at Museum Fodor; he covered the entire floor of one gallery with salt, and another with shards of broken sheet glass. The concept for Peanut-Butter Platform dates from 1962, a time when he began his association with the Fluxus movement; during the 1960s, he gained a reputation for absurdist and controversial works of art. He worked on short films as well, with Wim van der Linden and others. However, his relations with the established art world were troubled. By the early 1970s, he was working almost exclusively on writing and making television shows for the VPRO. Schippers referred to television as "the greatest gallery in the world".

== Execution ==
Peanut-Butter Platform was first executed in 1969 in the Mickery gallery in Loenersloot. The work was redone in 1997 in conjunction with a Schippers retrospective at the Centraal Museum in Utrecht, and again in a gallery in 2010. Museum Boijmans Van Beuningen in Rotterdam bought the concept in 2010 and installed it in 2011. Museum director Sjarel Ex stated that it was "one of the most important acquisitions made in 2010". The purchase price was not officially disclosed, but it was reportedly over €100,000. The artwork has flexible specifications, and may be installed in various ways. While previous installations were square, the piece constructed in the Rotterdam museum had dimensions of 4 by 12 metres (13 ft × 39 ft), and consisted of 700 litres (150 imp gal; 180 US gal) of peanut butter. According to a museum newsletter, "Schippers' works are known for their beauty and their senselessness."

At least three visitors accidentally walked onto the floor, and were held responsible for the damage. Schippers fielded more than 500 questions asked via video on the blog Pindakaaspost.

On the occasion of Schippers' seventieth birthday, a replica/duplicate of the artwork was installed in the Willy Dobbeplantsoen in Olst.
