= John Massis =

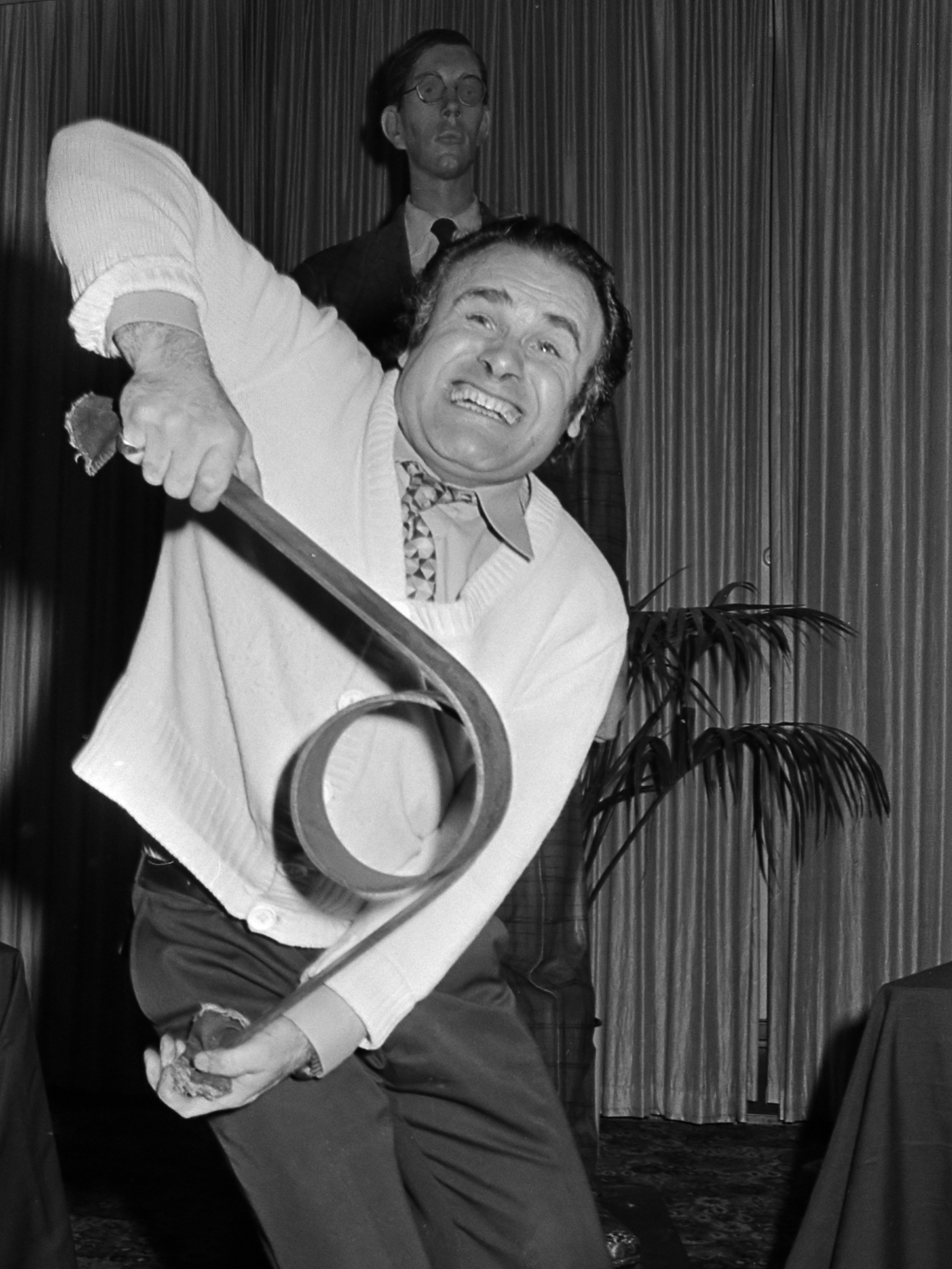
- John Massis (1977)
- Born: Wilfried Morbée; June 4, 1940; Bruges, Belgium
- Died: July 12, 1988 (aged 48); Ghent, Belgium
- Occupations: Strongman, Teeth-acrobat

John Massis (4 June 1940 – 12 July 1988) was a Flemish strongman and teeth-acrobat. His real name was Wilfried Morbée.

Massis specialized in bending iron with his teeth. He also performed stunts where he lifted cars, pulled trains and stopped motorbikes and even helicopters and hot air balloons with his teeth. This resulted in several entries in the Guinness World Records book. He even stopped 4 small sport planes of lifting off in 4 different directions.

== Career ==
Massis was pretty strong even as a young man, as he started performing these feats regularly at the age of 17, under the pseudonym “Mocules the strongman”. Only 3 years later, he managed to pull a car with four passengers for 100 yards. In 1963 John Massis became a professional circus artist and spent the next years performing around Europe until 1972. Around 1963, Wilfried Morbée took the name John Massis to reflect the name of the American boxer John Cosmeyer and popular Italian movie character Maciste who depicted as a Hercules-like figure.

In 1967, John Massis set the first Guinness record when he pulled a 15-ton train 50 feet long using his teeth. Two years later he broke another record in a similar manner, when he kept a 36-ton airplane with 200 horsepower off the ground. In 1969, he held a 200-horsepower plane at 2100 revs in Tokyo and a 700-horsepower plane at 1800 revs in 1972 at Grimbergen. Massis decided to quit his job at the circus to find a better paying job. He then worked as a bouncer in a Ghent club at night and as a gas boiler inspector during the day.

The man continued to tour solo during the rest of the decade, performing formidable stunts worldwide. In Ghent he was the first man to move a 121-ton locomotive, in Paris he lifted 233 kg 15 cm off the ground with his teeth, and in Hollywood he kept a helicopter on the ground with his teeth.

In the United States, Massis was guest in the David Frost Show (1974) and the Joe Franklin Show (1978).

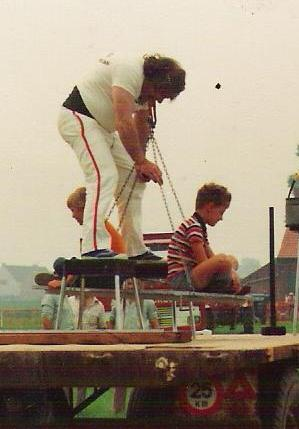
Massis during the lifting of several children with his teeth in 1978.

"Massis wasn't really a weightlifter, but he did have huge neck and shoulder muscles. For the stunts with his teeth he used an unusual technique, he could click his jaws together. Those stunts were very well calculated, he knew perfectly how much power e.g. a twinjet generated and whether he could handle it or not. An attempt to keep a hot-air balloon on the ground in 1982 failed, precisely because the exact force could not be calculated."

— Johan Heldenbergh on Massis

In 1980, he started pirate radio "Radio Superstar" and also recorded the song John Massis de krachtpatser. In 1987 he recorded Zet er je tanden in, with Willy Sommers.

In 1983 he also funded a political party called Positief Radicalen in Dutch or Positive Radicals.

He had a few roles too, in the Flemish film The Leeuw Van Vlaanderen (1984) and in the TV series De Opkopers, Hotel Américain and Merlina.

But during the 1980s, Massis' popularity in general began to wane. In his home country Belgium, his predictable stunts no longer received the attention as before, although they remained impressive. He struggled with personal problems and -in retrospect- he also suffered from diabetes, which severely reduced his condition. After he was called during a live talk show on national TV in response to an anonymous advertisement in the newspaper in which he was looking for a female partner, he fell into a depression.

== Death ==
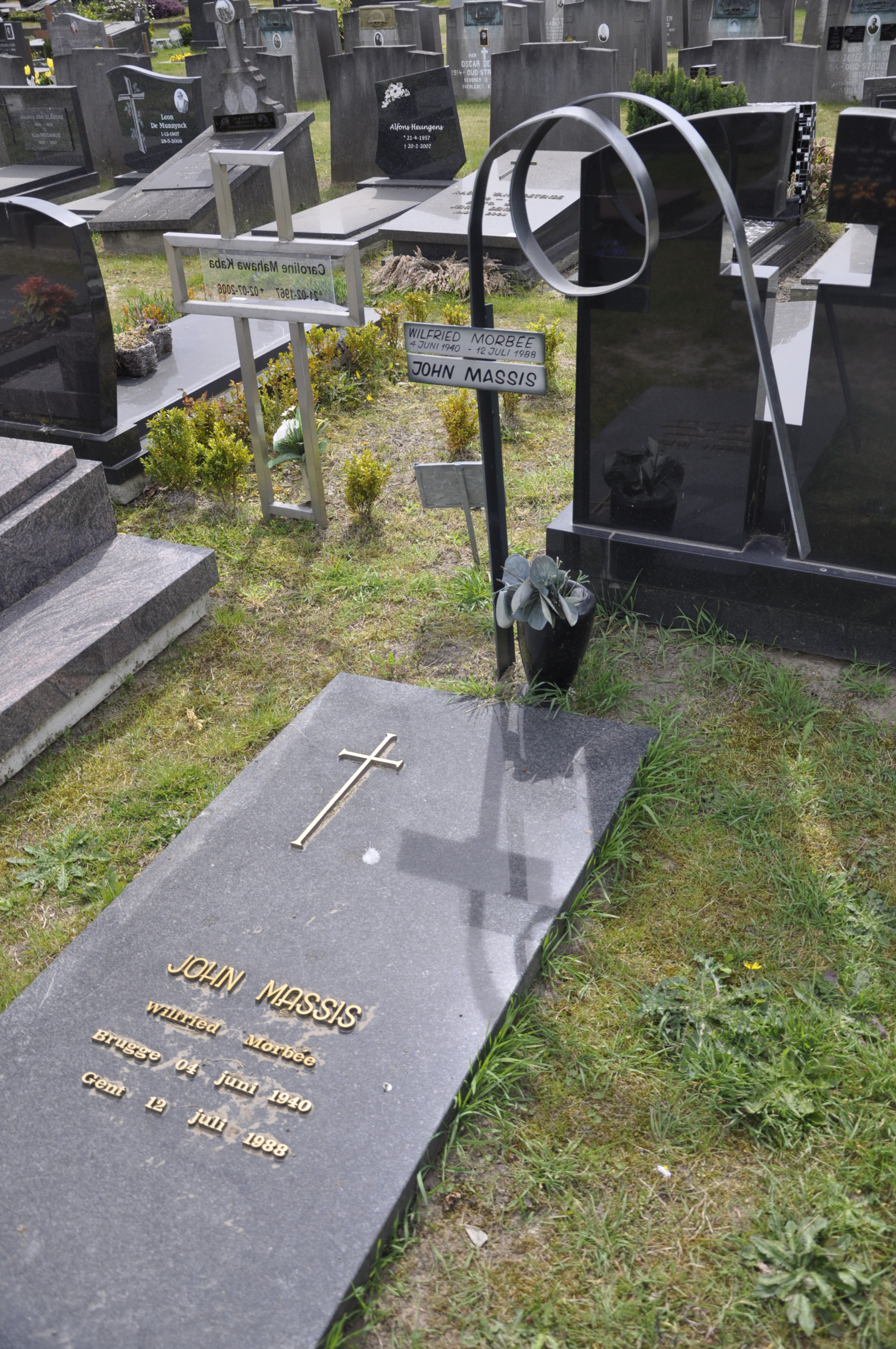
Grave of Massis in Gentbrugge

Because of his unknown and therefore untreated diabetes condition, Massis was found by the local police in a delirium. He was admitted to a psychiatric hospital. With waning media interest and diabetes undermining his condition, he committed suicide at the age of 48 officially on the 12th of July 1988. To make a statement he actually committed suicide on 11 July which is the day of the Flemish Community. He was found only the day after by his sisters Godelieve and Erna Morbée.

== Honours ==
He was an inspiration for the cartoonist Pirana in the 80's to draw the celebrity comic "Het Land Zonder Tanden" (1986). They were also close personal friends. He also made an appearance in the Kiekeboe-album De spray-historie (1988) with the cartoon character "John Massif", and he had also a cameo in the comic book series De Rode Ridder.

In 1999, the band Noordkaap referred to John Massis by naming their album Massis.

In 2004, Johan Heldenbergh performed in a play based on Massis' life: Massis, the Musical.

In 2005, Massis became number 172 on the list of the most famous Belgian ever in history.

A biography, Stalen Kaken (Steel Jaws) by Bavo Dhooge was published in 2005.

A tournament, the John Massis Cup, was organized for the first time in Gentbrugge, Belgium in 2023.

== See also ==
- List of strongmen
