= Love Trap (2004 film) =

- Theatrical release poster
- Directed by: Ruud van Hemert
- Screenplay by: Mischa Alexander
- Produced by: Paul Voorthuysen
- Starring: Antonie Kamerling; Daphne Bunskoek; Beau van Erven Dorens; Chantal Janzen
- Cinematography: Han Wennink
- Edited by: Michiel Reichwein
- Music by: Tjeerd P. Oosterhuis
- Production companies: PVPictures; TROS
- Distributed by: Universal Pictures (through United International Pictures)
- Release date: 12 February 2004
- Running time: 95 minutes
- Country: Netherlands
- Language: Dutch
- Box office: $647,110

Love Trap (Dutch: Feestje!) is a 2004 Dutch romantic comedy film directed by Ruud van Hemert. It stars Antonie Kamerling, Daphne Bunskoek, Beau van Erven Dorens and Chantal Janzen. It was released in the Netherlands on 12 February 2004.

== Cast ==
- Antonie Kamerling as Thijs
- Beau van Erven Dorens as Ben
- Chantal Janzen as Talita
- Daphne Bunskoek as Susan
- Roeland Fernhout as Sigmund
- Tara Elders as Maartje
- Trudy Labij as Anneth
