= Adeline van Lier =

Dutch television and radio presenter

Adeline van Lier (born 19 November 1956, at The Hague) is a Dutch television and radio presenter, currently working for the KRO. She studied graphic design and typography in The Hague, and then began working in theater. Her television debut was alongside IJf Blokker, for the VPRO program Puur natuur. Since 2006 she presents Nacht van het Goede Leven on Radio 1.

Her father Theo van Lier (1916–1992), was a member of the Dutch resistance during World War II. After the war he was politician of the Labour Party (PvdA).
