= Theo van den Boogaard =

Dutch cartoonist

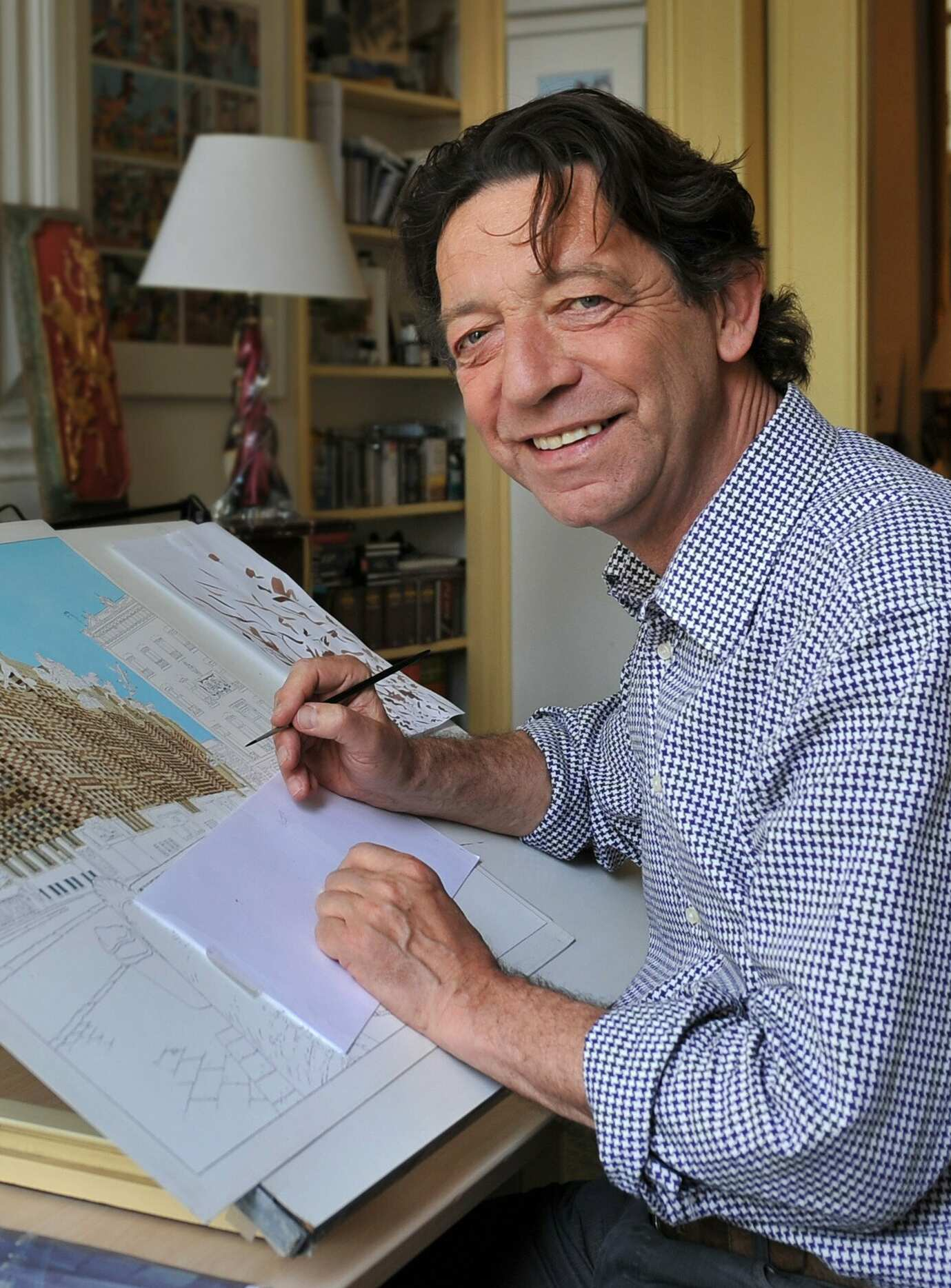
- Theo van den Boogaard, 2011
- Born: March 25, 1948 (age 77); Castricum, Netherlands
- Other names: Theo Bogart
- Occupation: cartoonist
- Notable work: Sjef van Oekel comic strip

Theo van den Boogaard (born 25 March 1948, Castricum, Netherlands) – also known as Theo Bogart – is a Dutch cartoonist. He first came to attention as an underground cartoonist in the early 1970s for the sexually explicit comics series Ans en Hans krijgen de kans (Ans and Hans Get the Chance). He is best known for co-creating Sjef van Oekel, a long-running comic strip based on the TV character, written by Wim T. Schippers. He received the 1989 Stripschapprijs for his body of work.

== Biography ==
=== Early life ===
Theo van den Boogaard was born in 1948 in Castricum, in the Netherlands province of North Holland. As a child, he was interested in drawing and singing. At the age of 15, he published his first comic Mark, Boter bij de Vis (Mark, Butter with the Fish) At the age of 17, he began drawing for Hitweek magazine and moved to Amsterdam after graduation to begin his career. Amsterdam would later have great influence on his work, with the city being known for its "free-spirited" feel and openness to sexuality and culture.

=== Career ===
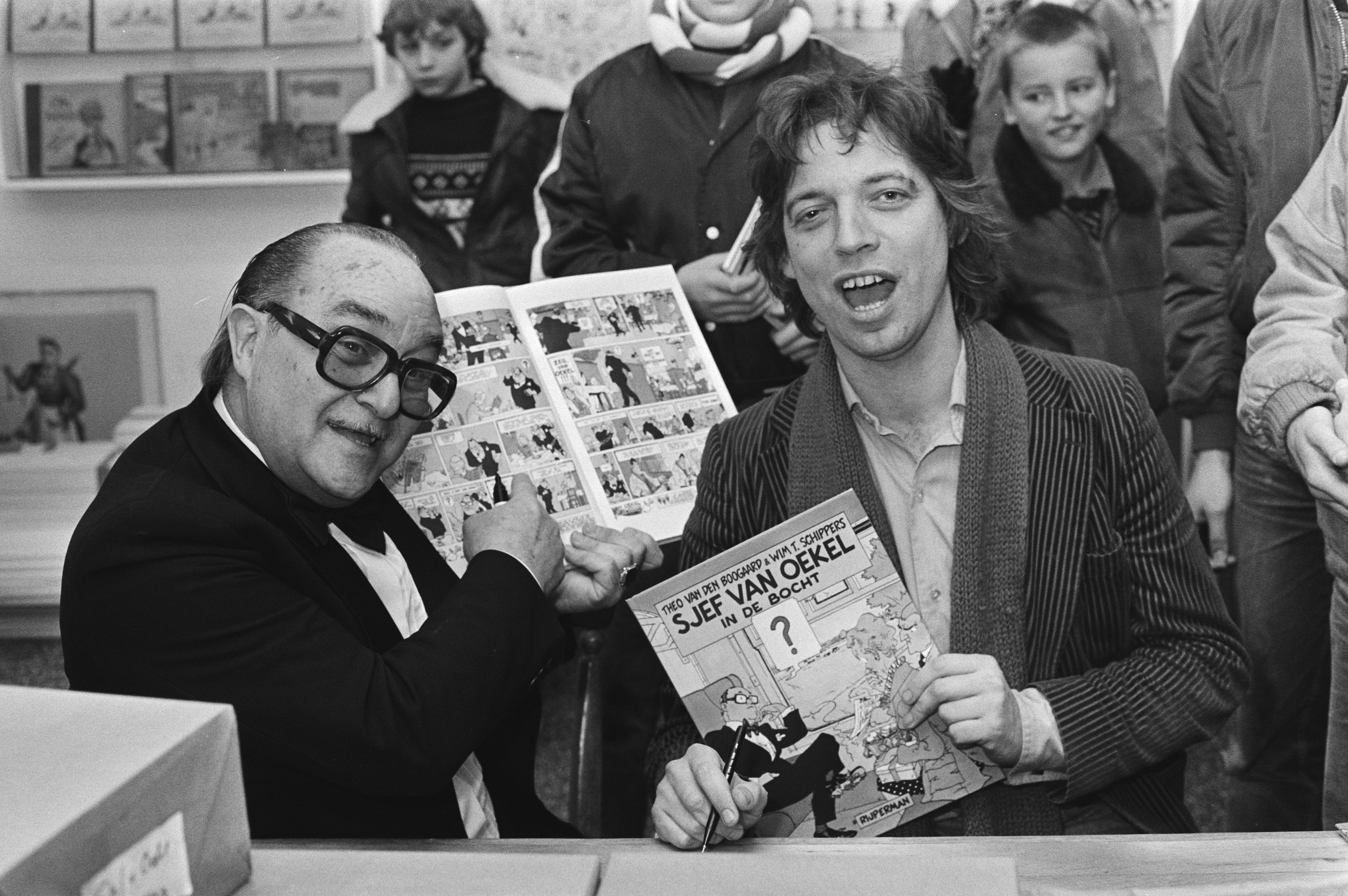
Van de Boogaard with "Sjef van Oekel" at an album signing at the Amsterdam comic bookstore Lambiek in December 1980

In 1967 he made the underground comix series Witje and Gertje for Hitweek, which was continued from 1968 to 1969 in Aloha. This work has been recognized as the first Dutch underground comic, but it faced criticism due to featuring a naked woman. For Studio, he drew the Pinocchio strip (1968). In 1969 he started in Aloha (and soon after in Chick) the series Ans en Hans krijgen de kans (Ans and Hans Get the Chance), which was noteworthy for its liberal treatment of sexuality, and gave him recognition by Andreas Knigger, a comics critic who described Boogaard as "the greatest European underground comics artist". The comic was published in 1972 as an album by De Bezige Bij.

For Voetbal International he drew the comic Abe, een hotshot van een voetballerina (Abe, a Hotshot of a Footballer) (1972), written by journalist Nico Scheepmaker.

Beginning in 1976, van den Boogaard drew Sjef van Oekel, a comic about the experiences of the well-known and controversial television character. The series was popular, and Dolf Brouwers, who played the character on TV, came to object to the fact that he received no compensation for his likeness being used, and for the sexual content of the series, and in 1989 he sued. In 1991 a judge ruled the character should not be portrayed in "obscene or pornographic scenes". Schippers and Bouwers eventually settled on the financial compensation.

Van den Boogaard made the album Joost mag het weten (Joost May Know), a collection with short humorous erotically-tinted stories about homosexuality, bestiality, and pedophilia.

Between 1980 and 1984, Boogaard was published in the American comics series Gay Comix. He drew an untitled comic in issue #1, "My Most Embarrassing Childhood Experience" in issue #3, and the back cover of issue #5.

In 2003, he published Theo van den Boogaard signs death. In 2005 he created Iron Lines, followed by The art of following, about receiving guidance. In 2013, he began to focus on his childhood dream of singing and drawing, and created a Bob Dylan piece that he plays on a screen while he performs Bob Dylan hits on stage. In 2016, he published Four Winters In a Row, a set of illustrations paired with a song of his, about a man struggling to find happiness.

=== Personal life ===
Van den Boogaard is openly gay, and has incorporated related themes into his work.

As of 2016, he has undergone chemotherapy treatment, but the type of cancer has not been disclosed. He has spoken of his struggles to keep drawing while undergoing chemotherapy, and discussed his fight for happiness in his Four Winters In a Row.

== Published works ==
- 1964 Mark, butter with the fish
- 1967–68 Witje and Gertje
- 1968 Pinocchio Comic Series
- 1969 Ans and Hans K Get De Kans
- 1970 Book issue Ans and Hans get the chance.
- 1972 Jan Alleman can do something about it
- 1973 Abe, hot story of a football player
- 1976 Van Oekel in the bend.
- 1979 The Ideograaf
- 1980 Ans and Hans get the chance
- 1980 Untitled Comic in Gay Comix #1
- 1982 Sjef van Oekel comic continues
- 1982 My Most Embarrassing Childhood Experience in Gay Comix #3
- 1983 Sjef van Oekel is looking for something higher
- 1985 Sjef van Oekel is drifting
- 1987 Sjef van Oekel bites himself
- 1989 Bird's eye view of Theo van den Boogaard.
- 1990 Joost Knows It
- 1990 Sjef van Oekel breaks through
- 1992 Language and Sign by Theo van den Boogaard
- 1992 Theo van den Boogaard, the 60s / 70s
- 1994 Sjef van Oekel hits back
- 1999 Sjef van Oekel unveils
- 2003 Theo van den Boogaard signs death
- 2005 Iron Lines by Theo van den Boogaard
- 2005 The art of following, about receiving guidance
- 2006 Series "Kenschetsen"
- 2010 I'm not getting well: A Sjef van Oekel omnibus
- 2010 Strokes of a serial draftsman
- 2011 Will it still be fun ...: A Sjef van Oekel omnibus
- 2011 Het Amsterdam van Theo van den Boogaard
- 2013 Bob Dylan Illustrated
- 2016 Four Winters In a Row

== Honors and awards ==
In 1989 Boogaard received the Nederlandse Stripschapprijs for his works.

== See also ==
- Gay Comix
- List of Comics Creators
- Underground Comix
- Sjef Van Oekel
- Wim T Schippers
