= Wim T. Schippers =

Dutch artist, comedian and television director (1942–2026)

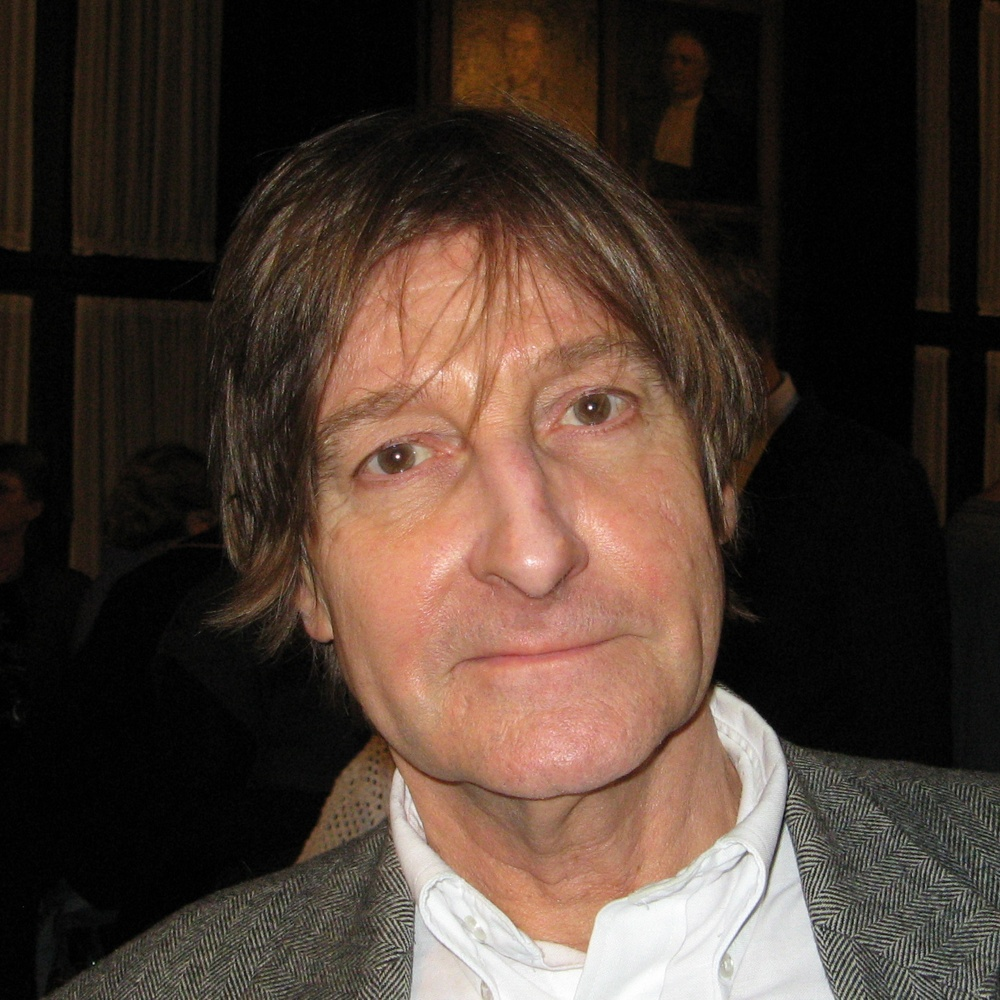
- Schippers in 2009
- Born: Willem Theodoor Schippers; 1 July 1942; Groningen, German-occupied Netherlands
- Died: 10 June 2026 (aged 83); Amsterdam, Netherlands
- Occupations: Artist, comedian, television director, and voice actor

Willem Theodoor Schippers (Dutch: [ʋɪm teː ˈsxɪpərs]; 1 July 1942 – 10 June 2026) was a Dutch artist, comedian, television director and voice actor. During the 1960s, he worked mostly as a visual artist, associated with the international Fluxus-movement. As a television writer, director, and actor he was responsible for some of the most notable and controversial shows on Dutch televisions from the 1960s to the 1990s, creating a number of lasting characters and creating terms and expressions which entered wide usage. In addition, he voiced the characters of Ernie and Kermit the Frog on Sesamstraat, the Dutch version of Sesame Street. For his shows, he wrote over three hundred songs, and his reputation changed from being Dutch television's "enfant terrible" to an acknowledged master in a variety of genres.

== Life and career ==
=== Early career: visual arts ===
Schippers, born in Groningen, grew up in Bussum and studied at the Kunstnijverheidsschool (later the Gerrit Rietveld Academie) in Amsterdam but did not graduate. He began a career as a visual artist in the early 1960s, influenced by dada and artists as Marcel Duchamp and Kurt Schwitters, participating in a number of Fluxus events, such as a section for the television program Signalement in 1963, in which he poured a bottle of lemonade in the North Sea. Willem Sandberg invited him and Ger van Elk to exhibit in Museum Fodor; among other things, they covered one floor with broken glass and one with kitchen salt. With Willem de Ridder and others he manufactured paper installations on the VARA television show Signalement that was ridiculed in the press in December 1963, and published a full-page enumeration of types of meat balls in 1965 in Vrij Nederland, already displaying his love for absurdist humor and language games that marked his later career. His first stint in television gained him notoriety along with the rest of the crew of the VPRO television show Hoepla (1967) when actress Phil Bloom became the first woman to appear nude on television. That show was quickly canceled, and Schippers returned to visual arts.

Throughout the 1960s Schippers' work was popular with the director of the Stedelijk Museum in Amsterdam, Willem Sandberg, who bought many of his drawings and collages. Sandberg's successor, Edy de Wilde, did invite Schippers for a solo show, but did not consider him a serious enough artist. A notable work was the Pindakaasvloer ("Peanut butter platform"), a floor covered with peanut butter. The concept dated from 1962, but it was first realized in 1969 in Loenersloot. The work was redone in 1997 in the Centraal Museum in Utrecht, and again in a gallery in 2010. Museum Boijmans Van Beuningen in Rotterdam bought the concept in 2010 and installed it in 2011; at least three visitors accidentally walked onto the 4 by 12-meter floor, and Schippers fielded more than 500 video questions on the blog Pindakaaspost. In July 2026, the Boijmans used over 800 pounds of peanut butter to re-create the installation over 25 square meters on the floor of the museum's Depot, in a tribute to the artist.

=== Radio and television ===
Schippers returned to VPRO television in 1971, writing De Fred Haché Show, with The Hague comedian Harry Touw as the character Fred Haché, directed by Schippers and Ruud van Hemert, Gied Jaspars, and Wim van der Linden. His girlfriend Ellen Jens produced the show, and worked with Schippers throughout his television career. Subsequently, he wrote Barend is weer bezig (which ran for five episodes) for the Hachéshow's character Barend Servet (played by IJf Blokker). The two shows were closely related (Schippers also designed the sets for both), and featured absurdist comedy which included the kinds of low-brow content not allowed to be seen or heard on Dutch television— dog poop, nudity, profanity. Controversy arose over a skit in which Barend Servet interviewed Juliana of the Netherlands (played by "Ria"); the queen drank sherry and cleaned Brussels sprouts to pretend to feel close to the Dutch people, before throwing them in the trash or donating them to a children's home. The show led to questions being asked in parliament about the depiction of her majesty, and the VPRO was censured by the minister of culture, narrowly escaping having its broadcasting hours cut.

For another character from the two shows, Sjef van Oekel (played by Dolf Brouwers), Schippers wrote Van Oekel's Discohoek (1974). It was a breakthrough for Brouwers (already 61 at the time), a former tour guide and hairdresser who had always aspired to becoming a star. Brouwers scored a few minor hits with songs from the show, and later became the main character in a series of comics by Theo van den Boogaard. Brouwers was also the lead in the 1978 television show Het is weer zo laat!, in which he played Waldo van Dungen, a part-time waiter in a night club who becomes its owner after a rich woman (Gé Braadslee, played by Mimi Kok) falls in love with him and buys the club for him. The show also included characters that would return in later shows, such as Boy Bensdorp (Rob van Houten) and Jan Vos (Clous van Mechelen). The night club, "Waldolala", provided Schippers the opportunity for more chaotic scenes, controversial nudity, and double entendres.

In the 1980s, Schippers wrote, directed, and acted in the VPRO shows De lachende scheerkwast, Opzoek naar Yolanda, and We zijn weer thuis. From 1984 to 1991 he had a radio show, Ronflonflon met Jacques Plafond. By the 1990s his early shows were collected by museums as video art, he had been awarded many times, winning the Lira award for television drama, and had graduated from being the "enfant terrible" of Dutch television to "an appreciated master in various genres". Many of the word jokes and catch phrases from his television and radio shows have found their way into the Dutch language—examples cited are "Jammer maar helaas" ("Pity, but unfortunate", Jacques Plafond), "Reeds!" ("Already!", Sjef van Oekel), "Pollens!" (untranslatable, Plafond), "Peu nerveu" (verbatim from French, "a bit nervous", Plafond), "Verdomd interessant, maar gaat u verder" ("that's damn interesting, but please continue", Plafond). Of all Dutch artists, in terms of contributions to the language he is only preceded by Marten Toonder, Kees van Kooten, and Wim de Bie, according to the book Verdomd Interessant, Maar Gaat U Verder: De Taal van Wim T. Schippers (2000). In addition, he estimated having written over three hundred songs for his television shows.

=== Plays ===
Schippers made three television plays for the VPRO, Ondergang van de Onan (1976), Sans rancune (1987), and De bruine jurk (1988). In 1986 he drew international attention as theater director with Going to the Dogs, a 46-minute play that premiered in the Stadsschouwburg in Amsterdam and featured six Alsatian dogs reading newspapers, watching TV, barking at the screen when they saw another dog on it, and occasionally relieving themselves. The drama on stage continued the absurdity of his television work, but the real play, according to Schippers, was the audience watching dogs on a stage. Since Going to the Dogs he has periodically returned to the stage, with Wuivend graan (2007) (nominated for the Toneel Publieksprijs, an audience award), Wat nu weer (2009), and most recently Het laatste nippertje (2011).

=== Voice work ===
Schippers voice-acted Ernie, Kermit the Frog, Guy Smiley, and Count von Count on Sesamstraat, the Dutch co-production of Sesame Street, ever since its first season in 1976. With Paul Haenen, who does the voice of Bert, he wrote and recorded a slew of Bert and Ernie albums.

He was also the voice of Happy in Disney's Snow White and the Seven Dwarfs in the Dutch dub from 1984.

== Visual arts ==
After de Wilde, director of the Stedelijk Museum, turned Schippers down, he returned only intermittently to the visual arts. He had an exposition of prints in the Stedelijk in 1970, accompanied by a rather puzzling text in the program, after which the relationship between him and the museum remained strained. Notable (and monumental) art projects of his include Torentje van Drienerlo (1979), in which the top of a tower rises above an artificial lake, suggesting the rest is underwater, and the "marriage room" in the Amsterdam Stopera (1988). Schippers' art work is praised for its sense of humor; when a dozen journalists stood pensively around the peanut butter platform, Schippers cried out, "Isn't this fantastic! We're all watching peanut butter!"

For his combined achievements in painting and writing, he was awarded the Jacobus van Looy prize in 2005.

== Death ==
Schippers died in Amsterdam on 10 June 2026, at the age of 83. His death was announced five days later, on 15 June.

== Works ==
=== Film ===
- Miss Minoes (2001)

=== Television ===
- Hoepla (VPRO, four episodes, 1967)
- De Fred Haché Show (VPRO, 1971)
- Barend is weer bezig (VPRO, 1972–1973)
- Van Oekel's Discohoek (VPRO, 12 episodes, 1974)
- Het is weer zo laat! (VPRO, 10 episodes, 1978)
- De lachende scheerkwast (VPRO, 12 episodes, 1981–1982)
- Opzoek naar Yolanda (VPRO, 6 episodes, 1984)
- Plafond over de vloer (VPRO, 9 episodes, 1986)
- We zijn weer thuis (VPRO, 47 episodes, 1989–1994)

=== Drama ===
- Going to the Dogs (1986)
- Wuivend graan (2007)
- Wat nu weer (2009)
- Het laatste nippertje (2011)

=== Television plays ===
- Ondergang van de Onan (VPRO, 1976)
- Sans rancune (VPRO, 1987)
- De bruine jurk (VPRO, 1988)

=== Albums ===
- Hark! 1980, Jacques Plafond & his Plafonnières
- Geen Touw (1990, compilation of Ronflonflon songs)
- Schippers in Plafondvaart (1992, compilation of Ronflonflon songs)
