= Harry Touw =

Dutch comedian and actor (1924–1994)

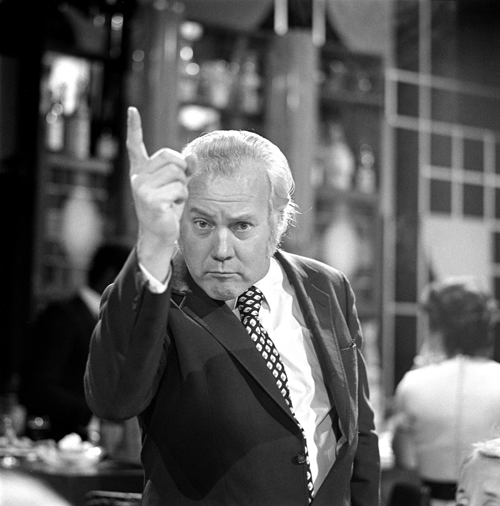
Harry Touw as Fred Haché in 1973

Harry Touw (7 April 1924 – 14 April 1994) was a Dutch comedian and television actor from The Hague, who rose to national prominence playing the characters Otto Kolkvet and Fred Haché in the satirical comedy shows written and directed by Wim T. Schippers, Ruud van Hemert, Gied Jaspars, and Wim van der Linden. He also sang, and made a number of records (including Bakken aan de Bar).
