= Ruud van Hemert =

Dutch film director

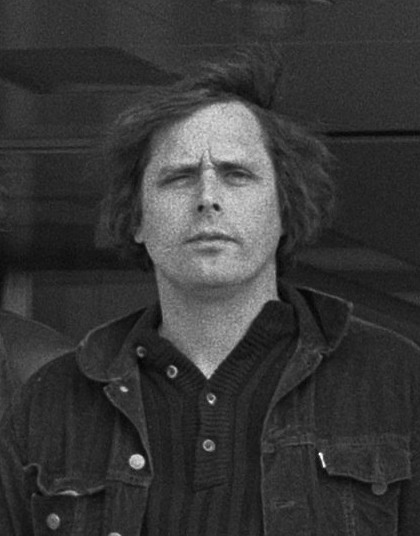
- Ruud van Hemert in 1973
- Born: 29 October 1938; Amsterdam, Netherlands
- Died: 5 July 2012 (aged 73); Wapserveen, Netherlands
- Occupations: Film and television director
- Years active: 1971–2004

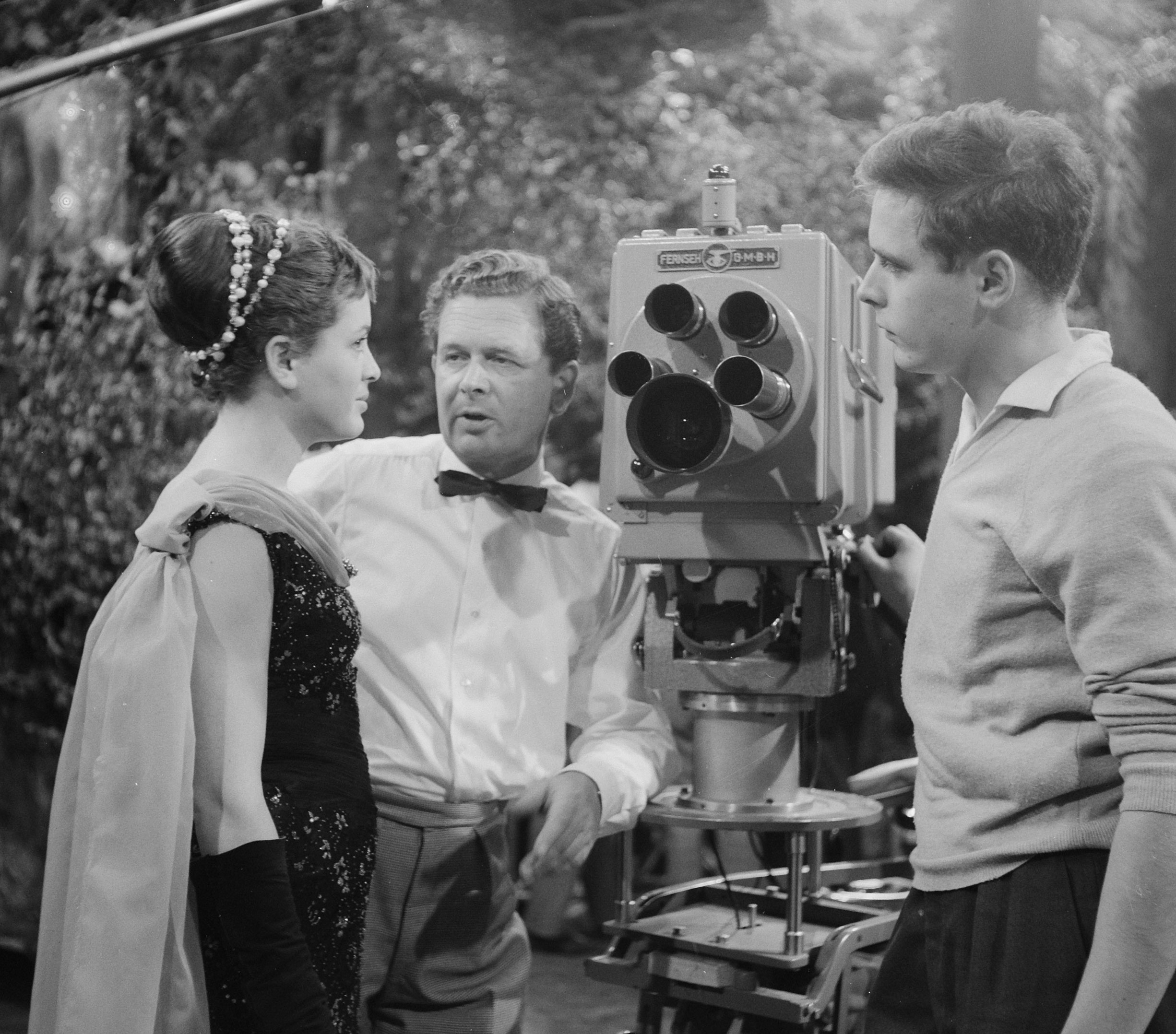
Ruud van Hemert with sister Ellen and father Willy in 1960

Ruud van Hemert (29 October 1938 – 5 July 2012) was a Dutch film director known especially for (dark) comedy. In the 1970s he helped produce and direct TV shows on VPRO before starting a career as a film director.

== Biography ==
Ruud van Hemert was the son of television producer Willy van Hemert, and followed in his father's footsteps, making two television films for the VPRO, TV-Eiland (1965), and Pepijn op wieletjes ("a children's film for and about naughty children" conceived by Hans Andreus, followed by a few other children's shows, with Harrie Geelen. A breakthrough was the (stylistically experimental) documentary Oranje Vrijstaat, which had controversial politician Roel van Duijn as a central figure. His career took off when he cooperated with Wim T. Schippers, Gied Jaspars, and Wim van der Linden on such shows as De Fred Hachéshow (1971), Barend is weer bezig (1972–1973), and Van Oekel's Discohoek (1974), a series of TV shows that are credited with changing Dutch television forever by destroying it as a medium for serious and proper programming.

Van Hemert was already 46 when he made his debut as a film director in 1984 with the film Schatjes! ("Darlings"), one of the biggest box-office hits in Dutch cinema. In Schatjes!, a dark family comedy, guerrilla warfare between disturbed parents (Peter Faber and Geert de Jong) and their disruptive children leads to chaos and mayhem (at the end of the film, the parents are buried, in their car, under a layer of asphalt); the film drew 1.5 million visitors (some 10% of the Dutch population), making it one of the most successful Dutch films ever. Van Hemert followed up with a sequel in 1986, Mama is boos! ("Momma is angry"), another commercial success with 2 million tickets sold. Variety noted that while the anti-bourgeois mentality of the TV shows he did for the VPRO was maintained in the films, van Hemert himself said he was influenced more strongly by Hollywood cinema. Dutch films of the period were generally influenced by Hollywood; other "Hollands Hollywood" productions were Dick Maas's De Lift (1983) and Flodder (1986).

1988's Honneponnetje, a follow-up to Schatjes! and Mama is boos, was not well received by critics—it was "no more than a thousandfold-retold wet dream from a frustrated teenager". His career did not fare well during the 1990s, when he was unable to get financing for his scripts. He built a house in Spain and taught acting. He returned, with some success, in 2001 with I Love You Too, based on a novel by Ronald Giphart (141,257 visitors), and in 2004 his last film, Feestje! (77,399 visitors). His career, however, went downhill. He wrote about his frustrations with the film industry in a book called Bruut, and retired to Spain. In 2008 he survived prostate cancer, but in 2011 he was diagnosed with an aggressive form of throat cancer and he died the year after, at the house of friends in Wapserveen.

== Selected filmography ==
- Schatjes! (1984)
- Mama is boos! (1986)
- Honneponnetje (1988)
- I Love You Too (2001)
- Love Trap (2004)
