= Tony Hutchings =

Welsh cyclist

Personal information
- Nationality: British (Welsh)

Sport
- Sport: Cycling
- Events: Track and Road
- Club: Cardiff Ajax

Anthony Peter Hutchings is a former racing cyclist from Wales, who represented Wales at the British Empire Games (now Commonwealth Games).

== Biography ==
Hutchings was a member of the Cardiff Ajax cycling team and finished runner-up in the 50-mile Cardiff Ajax championship in May 1961. His good form continued as he finished runner-up in the 45 mile Coventry Evening Telegraph annual road race event.

At the 1962 British Empire and Commonwealth Games in Perth, Australia, he represented the 1962 Welsh team and participated in the pursuit, scratch and road race events.
