= Van Oekel's Discohoek =

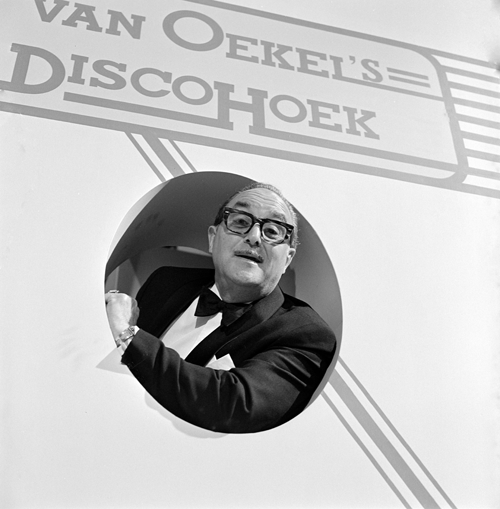
- Country of origin: Netherlands
- Original language: Dutch

Original release
- Network: VPRO

Van Oekel's Discohoek is a Dutch television show, aired on VPRO in 1974–1975. The show, written by Wim T. Schippers and produced by Ellen Jens, starred Dolf Brouwers as the comedic character Sjef van Oekel, and parodied music television programs of the era. Artists gave obviously lip-synched performances of their songs and were frequently interrupted and insulted by van Oekel. Captain Beefheart's appearance became one of the show's most famous moments. The show also featured one of the first TV appearances of Donna Summer, who later claimed that her breakthrough began with her performance of her song "The Hostage", in which she gracefully went along with the scripted absurdity and chaos. The show inspired a similarly absurd show Plattenküche on the German WDR.

Due to the popularity of Sjef van Oekel a comic strip series was created around his character, written by Wim T. Schippers with art by Theo van den Boogaard.

== See also ==
- Sjef van Oekel
