= Wim van der Linden =

Dutch film director and photographer (1941–2001)

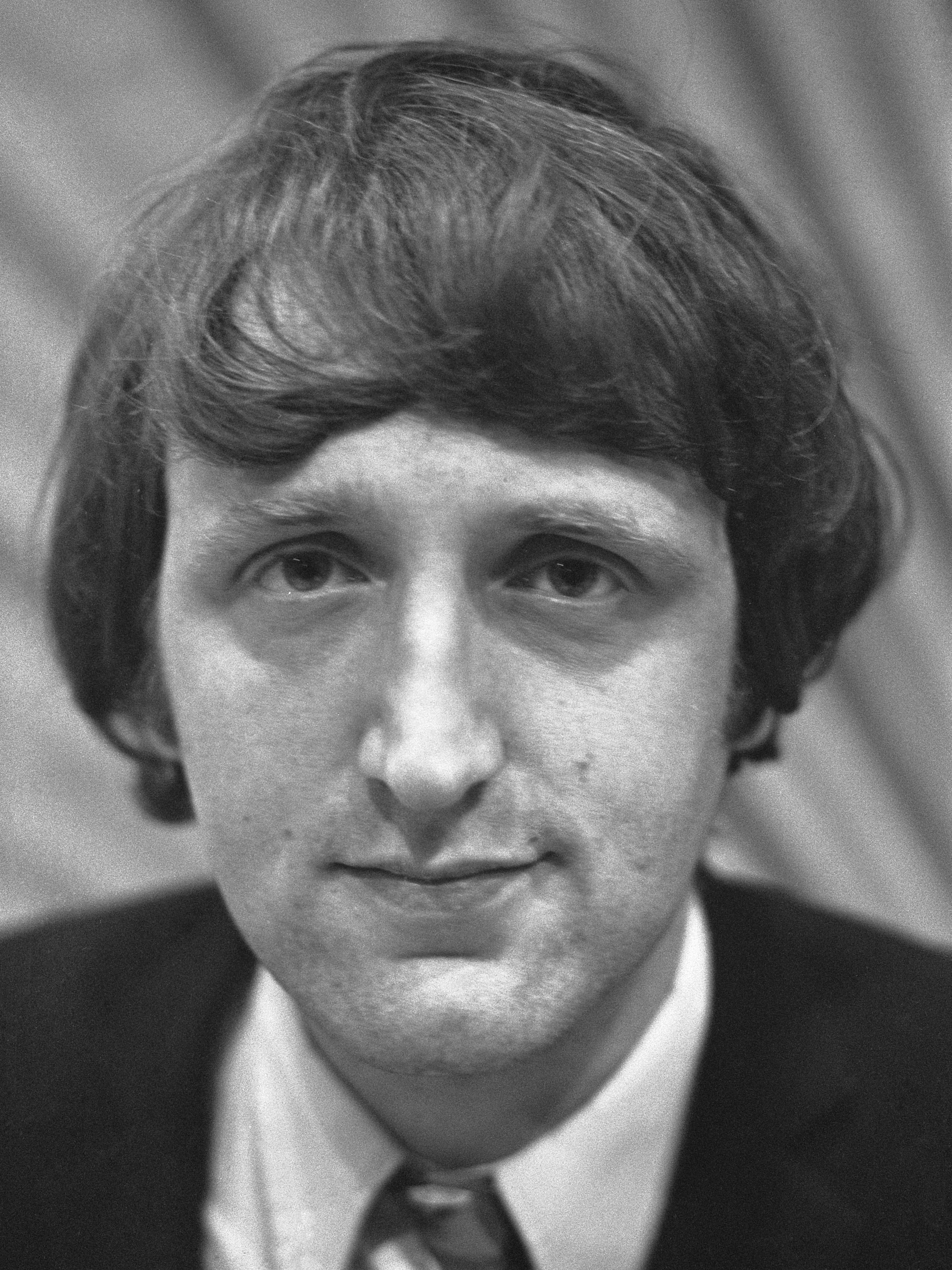
Wim van der Linden, 1968

Wim van der Linden (1 January 1941, Amsterdam – 4 April 2001, Miami) was a Dutch photographer and film and television director. As a photographer he documented slums and subcultures in Amsterdam in the 1960s. His "Tulips", one of four experimental and satirical Sad Movies (1966-1967), is praised as one of the dramatic high points of Dutch film history, and with Wim T. Schippers and others he made groundbreaking and controversial television shows for the VPRO in the 1960s to the 1970s.

== Biography ==
Van der Linden studied at the Netherlands Film and Television Academy, and gained prominence as a photographer in the early 1960s, taking pictures of nozems, teenagers who made up the first Dutch counterculture of the post-World War II period. His 1962 exposition Het andere Mokum ("The other Amsterdam"), a collection of photos of the city's slums and the people who lived in it was the basis for a photo album he made by hand and delivered to the city's mayor, van Hall. To open the exposition, the city's spokesperson, Jan Mastenbroek, delivered a passionate lecture in which he used his photos as evidence to emphasize the urgency of developing the Bijlmermeer as a space to build large, clean homes. As a "photographer of Amsterdam", he is said to be on a par with his more famous colleague Ed van der Elsken Van der Linden's negatives are archived in the Maria Austria Institute in Amsterdam.

The films he made in the early 1960s show his affinity with the Fluxus movement. The Sad Movies, a series of short, satirical movies shot on 16 and 35 mm, were a cooperation with fellow Fluxus artist Willem de Ridder, with whom he found the "Dodgers Syndicate", which another Fluxus artist, Wim T. Schippers, joined in 1966. In all four Sad Movies were made: "Rape", "Tulips", "Summer in the fields", and "Bon appetit". "Tulips", a favorite among critics, consisted of a two and a half-minute film of a credenza with a vase of tulips on it; the camera is motionless and the film consists of one single long take, with tension provided courtesy of one single leaf that falls as the camera slowly zooms in and a dramatic soundtrack. The Sad Movies were released as a bonus on the DVD edition of De Fred Haché Show. Van der Linden worked as a camera man as well, for instance on the first full-length movie by Wim Verstappen, De minder gelukkige terugkeer van Joszef Kàtus naar het land van Rembrandt (1966).

As a television maker, he is best known as the colleague of Schippers, Gied Jaspars, and Ruud van Hemert, the team that made groundbreaking and controversial shows such as Hoepla (1967), the first show in which a naked woman (model Phil Bloom) appeared, and absurdist comedy shows such as De Fred Haché Show (1971) and Barend is weer bezig. He made a few shows for German television, then moved to Los Angeles where he invented the ScriptBoy, an electronic clapperboard. He died in Miami of a heart attack.

== Select filmography ==
- Hoepla (1967)
- De Fred Haché Show (1971)
- Barend is weer bezig (1972–1973)
- Van Oekel's Discohoek (1975)
- Het is weer zo laat (1978)
