= List of Dutch films of the 1970s =

This is a list of films produced in the Netherlands during the 1970s. The films are produced in the Dutch language.

Title	Year	Director	Cast	Genre	Notes
1970
Allemaal naar Bed	1970	Dick Visser		Documentaire	
De Worstelaar		Paul Verhoeven	Wim Zomer o.a	korte film	
Rubia's Jungle		Pim de la Parra	Quinn O'Hara, Adrian Brine	Drama	
Daniel		Erik Terpstra	Peter Schaapman, André van den Heuvel	Komedie	
De Val		Adriaan Ditvoorst			
1971
Mira	1971	Fons Rademakers	Willeke van Ammelrooy, Jan Decleir	Drama	Entered into the 1971 Cannes Film Festival
Wat Zien Ik!?		Paul Verhoeven	Ronnie Bierman, Sylvia de Leur	Komedie	

Title	Year	Director	Cast	Genre	Notes
1972
De Inbreker	1972	Frans Weisz	Rijk de Gooyer, Jon Bluming	Thriller; Misdaad	
Bij de beesten af		Bert Haanstra		Documentaire	
1973
Turks Fruit		Paul Verhoeven	Rutger Hauer, Monique van de Ven	Drama	
Love Comes Quietly		Nikolai van der Heyde			Entered into the 23rd Berlin International Film Festival
Naakt over de Schutting		Frans Weisz	Rijk de Gooyer, Jon Bluming		
Niet Voor De Poesen		Fons Rademakers	Bryan Marshall, Alexandra Stewart	Drama; Misdaad	
Het Dwaallicht					Belgische co-productie
Frank en Eva		Pim de la Parra	Hugo Metsers, Willeke van Ammelrooy	Erotiek; Drama	
Op de Hollandse Toer		Harry Booth	Wim Sonneveld	Komedie	
Vaarwel		Guido Pieters	Pieke Dassen, Iwan Ruycken	Drama	
De Blinde Fotograaf		Adriaan Ditvoort			
Van Doorn		Wim Verstappen	Kees Brusse, Andrea Domburg	Drama	
Geen paniek		Ko Koedijk	Johnny Kraaykamp, Rijk de Gooyer	Komedie	
1974
Dakota	1974		Wim Verstappen	Kees Brusse	
Mariken van Nieumeghen		Jos Stelling	Ronnie Montagne, Sander Pais	Historisch Drama	Entered into the 1975 Cannes Film Festival
Alicia		Pim de la Parra	Willeke van Ammelrooy, Hugo Metsers	Erotiek, Drama	
De vijf van de vierdaagse		René van Nie	Johnny Kraaykamp, Jan Blaaser	Komedie	
Help! De Dokter Verzuipt		Nikolai van der Heyden	Piet Bambergen, Jules Croiset	Komedie	
Oom Ferdinand en de Toverdrank					
Verloren Maandag					
1975
Zwaarmoedige Verhalen voor bij de Centrale Verwarming	1975				
Mijn nachten met Susan, Olga, Julie, Piet en Sandra		Pim de La Parra	Willeke van Ammelrooy, Hans van der Gragt		
Rooie Sien		Frans Weisz	Willeke Alberti, Jules Hamel	Drama	Entered into the 9th Moscow International Film Festival
Keetje Tippel		Paul Verhoeven	Rutger Hauer; Monique van de Ven		
Het Jaar van de Kreeft		Herbert Curiel	Rutger Hauer, Willeke van Ammelrooy		
De Laatste Trein		Erik van Zuylen	Han Bentz van den Berg, Monique van de Ven	Drama	
Flanagan		Adriaan Ditvoorst	Guido de Moor, Eric Schneider		
Heb Medelij Jet		Frans Weisz	John Kraaykamp, Piet Romer	Komedie	
Dokter Pulder zaait papavers		Bert Haanstra	Kees Brusse, Ton Lensink	Drama	Entered into the 26th Berlin International Film Festival
Kind van de zon		René van Nie	Josee Ruiter, Ramses Shaffy	Drama	
Mens Erger je Niet		Wim Verstappen	Willeke van Ammelrooy, Hugo Metsers	Komedie; Drama	
De Heilige Familie					
Rufus		Samuel Meyering	Rijk de Gooyer, Cox Habbema	Komedie; Drama	
Pim Pandoer in het Nauw					
Pipo de Clown en de Piraten van Toen			Cor Witschge	Jeugd	eerste film gebaseerd op de jeugdserie Pipo de Clown
De dwaze lotgevallen van Sherlock Jones		Nikolai van der Heyde	Piet Bambergen	Komedie	
1976
De Komst van Joachim Stiller	1976				
Alle dagen feest		Ate de Jong, Otto Jongerius o.a	Peter Faber, Hans man in't veld		
Max Havelaar		Fons Rademakers	Peter Faber, Sacha Bulthuis	Drama, Historie	
Wan Pipel		Pim de la Parra	Borger Breeveld, Willeke van Ammelrooy		
Dood van een Non					
Vandaag of morgen		Roeland Kerbosch	Ton van Duinhoven, Wim de Haas		
Peter en de vliegende autobus		Kars van der Meulen	Henny Alma	Jeugd	
Toestanden		Thijs Chanowski	Helmert Woudenberg, Joop Admiraal		
1977
Een Stille Liefde	1977	René van Nie	Cor van Rijn, Sem de Jong		Entered into the 10th Moscow International Film Festival
Blindgangers		Ate de Jong	Ansje Beentjes, Derek de Lint	Drama	
Bloedverwanten		Wim Lindwer	Maxim Hamel, Sophie Deschamps		
Het Debuut		Nouchka van Brakel	Marina de Graaf, Gerard Cox	Drama	
De Peetmoeder		Tom Manders jr.	Teddy Schaank, Bert Dijkstra	Drama, Thriller	
Rembrandt fecit 1669		Jos Stelling	Frans Stelling, Ton de Koff	Historie	
Soldaat van Oranje		Paul Verhoeven	Rutger Hauer, Jeroen Krabbe		
1978
Pastorale 1943	1978	Wim Verstappen	Renée Soutendijk, Frederik de Groot		
Dokter Vlimmen		Guido Pieters	Peter Faber		
Mysteries		Paul de Lussanet	Sylvia Kristel, Rutger Hauer		
Pinkeltje		Harrie Geelen	Aart Staartjes; Wieteke van Dort	Jeugd	
Doodzonde		René van Nie	Cor van Rijn, Chris Lomme		
Dag Dokter!		Ate de Jong	André van den Heuvel, Astrid Wijn		
Camping		Thijs Chanowski	Peter Faber, Shireen Strooker	Komedie	
De Mantel der Liefde		Adriaan Ditvoorst	Joost Prinsen, Hans Boskamp		
Nacht zonder zegen		Jan Dorresteijn	Geert Tijssens, Ingrid de Vos		
Meneer Klomp		Otto Jongerius	Leo de Hartogh, Mirjam van Loon	Drama	
1979
Martijn en de Magiër	1979	Karst van der Meulen	Lex Goudsmit; Joost Prinsen	Jeugd	
Mijn Vriend		Fons Rademakers	Peter Fber	Misdaad; Drama	
Duel in de diepte			Rutger Hauer		mini-serie
Grijpstra en de Gier		Wim Verstappen	Rijk de Gooyer, Rutger Hauer	Misdaad; Drama	
Kort Amerikaans		Guido Pieters	Derek de Lint, Tingue Dongelmans	Thriller; Drama	
Een Vrouw als Eva		Nouchka van Brakel	Monique van de Ven, Maria Schneider	Drama	
Een Pak Slaag		Bert Haanstra	Kees Brusse, Paul Steenbergen	Drama	
Opname		Marja Kok, Erik van Zuylen	Helmert Woudenberg, Frank Groothof	Drama	
Twee Vrouwen		George Sluizer	Bibi Andersson, Anthony Perkins	Drama	
Cha Cha		Herbert Curiel	Herman Brood, Nina Hagen	Documentaire	
Uit Elkaar		Herman van Veen	Herman van Veen, Monique van de Ven	Drama	
De Verwording van Herman Dürer					
