= Rutger Hauer filmography =

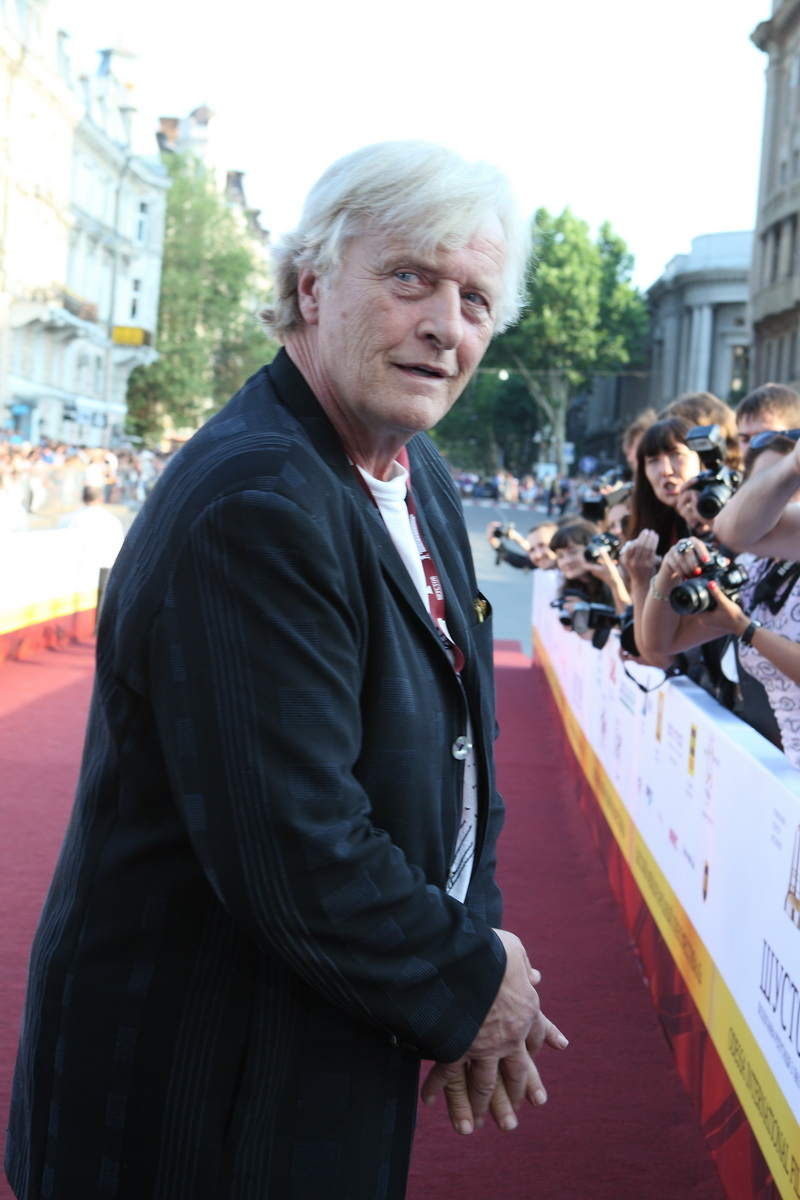
Rutger Hauer at the Odesa International Film Festival, 2010

The filmography of Rutger Hauer lists all his performances as an actor in films, television films and television series, from 1969 to his death, and in posthumous films.

Hauer said in the documentary film Blond, Blue Eyes (2006) that, from the beginning of his acting career, he turned down most of the roles which held little interest for him. He rarely accepted a role for the money. Hauer also said he might have been brilliant in only two or three films. He considered his performance in The Legend of the Holy Drinker (1988) to have been one of these instances of brilliance.

== Filmography ==
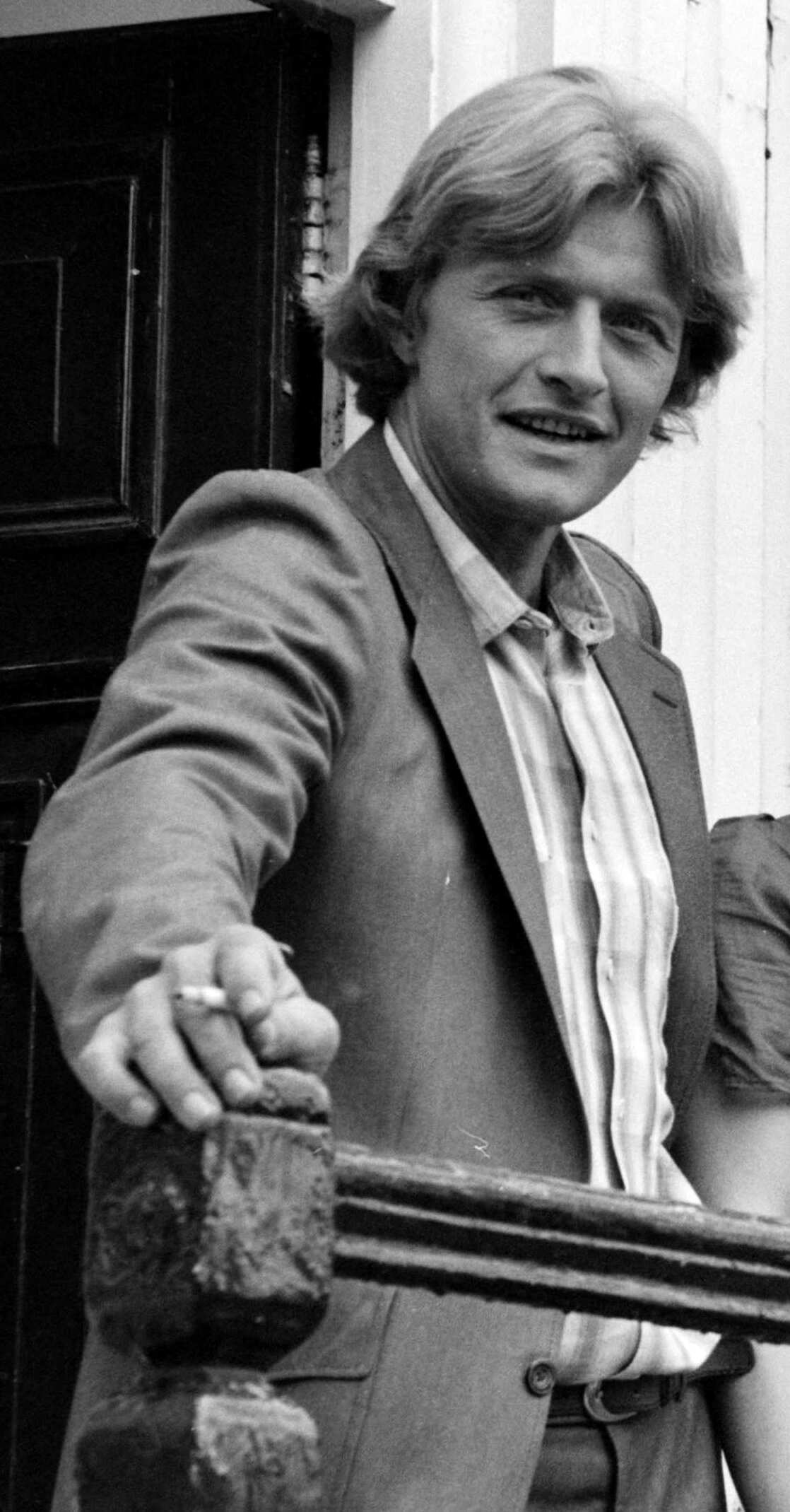
Rutger Hauer filming Grijpstra & De Gier, 1979

=== Film ===
Year	Title	Role	Notes
1969	Monsieur Hawarden	Unknown	Deleted scenes
1973	Rumplestiltskin	The King	Original title: Repelsteeltje
1973	Turkish Delight	Eric Vonk	Original title: Turks Fruit
1974	Cold Blood	Chris	Original title: Das Amulett des Todes
1974	Dandelions	Rick	Original title: Pusteblume
1974	The Wilby Conspiracy	Blane Van Niekerk	
1975	Katie Tippel	Hugo	Original title: Keetje Tippel
1975	The Year of the Cancer	Pierre	Original title: Het jaar van de kreeft
1976	Max Havelaar	Duclari	
1977	Soldier of Orange	Erik Lanshof	Original title: Soldaat van Oranje
1978	Pastorale 1943	August Schultz	
1978	Woman Between Wolf and Dog	Adriaan	Original title: Femme entre chien et loup
1978	Mysteries	Johan Nagel	Alternate title: Evil Mysteries
1979	The Bank Robbery	Ryder	Original title: Es begann bei Tiffany
1979	Grijpstra & De Gier	Rinus de Gier	
1980	Spetters	Gerrit Witkamp	
1981	Nighthawks	Heymar "Wulfgar" Reinhardt / Eric	Hollywood debut film
1981	Chanel Solitaire	Étienne Balsan	
1982	Blade Runner	Roy Batty	Nominated—Saturn Award for Best Supporting Actor
1983	The Osterman Weekend	John Tanner	
1983	Eureka	Claude Maillot Van Horn	
1984	A Breed Apart	Jim Malden	
1984	Terror in the Aisles	Heymar "Wulfgar" Reinhardt / Eric	Archival footage
1985	Ladyhawke	Captain Etienne Navarre	
1985	Flesh & Blood	Martin	
1986	The Hitcher	John Ryder	
1986	Wanted: Dead or Alive	Nick Randall	
1988	The Legend of the Holy Drinker	Andreas Kartak	Original title: La leggenda del santo bevitore Golden Space Needle Award for Best Actor; Nominated—Sant Jordi Award for Best Foreign Actor
1989	Desert Law	Tom Burton	
1989	Blind Fury	Nick Parker	
1989	As Long as It's Love	John Knott	Original title: In una notte di chiaro di luna
1989	The Salute of the Jugger	Sallow	released in the US as: Blood of Heroes
1989	Bloodhounds of Broadway	"The Brain"	
1991	Wedlock	Frank Warren	
1991	Past Midnight	Ben Jordan	
1992	Beyond Justice	Tom Burton	
1992	Split Second	Harley Stone	
1992	Buffy the Vampire Slayer	Lothos	
1993	Voyage	Morgan Novell	
1993	Arctic Blue	Ben Corbett	
1994	Surviving the Game	Thomas Burns	
1994	Nostradamus	The Mystic Monk	
1994	The Beans of Egypt, Maine	Reuben Bean	
1994	Blood of the Innocent	Dr. Lem	
1995	Mr. Stitch	Dr. Rue Wakeman	
1996	Crossworlds	Alex "A.T."	Direct-to-video
1996	Mariette in Ecstasy	Chaplain	Unreleased
1996	Precious Find	Armond Crille	
1996	Omega Doom	Omega Doom	
1997	Knockin' on Heaven's Door	Curtiz	
1997	Blast	Leo	
1997	The Call of the Wild: Dog of the Yukon	John Thornton	
1997	Bleeders	Dr. Marlowe	
1997	Deathline	John Anderson Wade	
1998	Bone Daddy	William H. Palmer	
1998	Tactical Assault	Captain John "Doc" Holiday	Direct-to-video
1999	Simon Magus	Count Albrecht, The Squire	
1999	New World Disorder	Detective David Marx	
2000	Lying in Wait	Keith Miller	
2000	Partners in Crime	Gene Reardon	
2000	Wilder	Dr. Sam Dennis Charney	
2001	Jungle Juice	Jean-Luc	
2001	The Room	Harry	Short film; also co-director
2001	The Last Words of Dutch Schultz	Arthur "Dutch Schultz" Flegenheimer	Voice; Short film
2001	Turbulence 3: Heavy Metal	MacIntosh, Co-Pilot	Direct-to-DVD
2001	Flying Virus	Colonel Ezekial	
2002	The Bankers of God: The Calvi Affair	Cardinale Marcinkus	Original title: I banchieri di Dio
2002	Scorcher	President Nelson	
2002	Warrior Angels	Grekkor	
2002	Confessions of a Dangerous Mind	Keeler	
2004	In the Shadow of the Cobra	Gallo	
2004	Tempesta	Van Beuningen	
2004	Never Enough	Sebastian	Original title: Camera ascunsa
2005	Sin City	Cardinal Patrick Henry Roark	
2005	Batman Begins	William Earle	
2005	Dracula III: Legacy	Count Dracula	Direct-to-DVD
2005	Mirror Wars	Mysterious Man	Original title: Zerkalnie voyni: Otrazhenie pervoye
2006	The Hunt for Eagle One	General Frank Lewis	Direct-to-DVD
2006	Minotaur	Cyrnan	
2006	Mentor	Sanford Pollard	
2006	The Hunt for Eagle One: Crash Point	General Frank Lewis	
2007	Goal II: Living the Dream	Rudi Van Der Merwe	
2007	Moving McAllister	Maxwell McAllister	
2007	Dead Tone	Detective John Criton	
2008	Spoon	Victor Spoon	
2008	Magic Flute Diaries	Dr. Richard Nagel	
2008	Bride Flight	Old Frank de Rooy	
2009	Barbarossa	Frederick Barbarossa	
2009	Tonight at Noon	Diego Van Der Haagen	
2010	Happiness Runs	Insley	
2011	Hobo with a Shotgun	Hobo	
2011	The Mill and the Cross	Peter Bruegel	
2011	The Rite	Istvan Kovak	
2011	Black Butterflies	Abraham Jonker	
2011	Alle for én	Mr. Niemeyer	
2011	The Heineken Kidnapping	Alfred Heineken	Original title: De Heineken Ontvoering
2011	The Cardboard Village	The Sacristan	Original title: Il Villaggio di Cartone
2011	The Reverend	Withstander	Direct-to-DVD
2012	Dracula 3D	Abraham Van Helsing	
2012	Agent Ranjid rettet die Welt	Freek Van Dyk	
2012	Life's a Beach	Jean-Luc	
2013	Real Playing Game	Steve Battier	
2013	Il Futuro ("The Future")	Maciste	
2014	Unity	Narrator	Voice; documentary
2014	2047 - Sights of Death	Colonel Asimov	
2015	Clones	Dr Richards	Short film 15 min
2015	The Scorpion King 4: Quest for Power	King Zakour	Direct-to-DVD
2015	Michiel de Ruyter	Maarten Tromp	
2015	The Letters	Father Benjamin Praggh	
2015	WAX: We Are the X	Aron Mulder	
2016	Beyond Valkyrie: Dawn of the 4th Reich	Oskar Halminski	
2017	Drawing Home	Carl Rungius	
2017	Gangsterdam	Dolph Van Tannen	
2017	Valerian and the City of a Thousand Planets	The President of The World State Federation	
2017	The Broken Key	Professor Adrian Moonlight	
2017	24 Hours to Live	Frank	
2018	Corbin Nash	Stranger	
2018	Samson	Manoah	
2018	The Sisters Brothers	The Commodore	
2018	The Sonata	Richard Marlowe	
2019	Viy 2: Journey to China	The Ambassador	Posthumous release
2020	Break	Ray	Posthumous release
TBA	Tonight at Noon	Diego	Completed, Posthumous release
TBA	Emperor	John, The Constant	Post-production, posthumous release

=== Television ===
Year	Title	Role	Notes
1969	Floris	Floris Van Rosemond	
1969	Pathfinders	Pieter Van Paarsen	Episode: "Sitting Ducks"
1973	Waaldrecht	Rogier de Jonge	Episode: "Taxi, Meneer ?"
1975	Cyrano de Bergerac	De Valvert	Television recording
1975	Floris von Rosemund	Floris	
1978	Heilige Jeanne	Dunois	Television recording of Saint Joan
1979	Duel in de diepte	John Van Der Velde	4 episodes
1982	Inside the Third Reich	Albert Speer	Television film
1987	Escape from Sobibor	Lieutenant Aleksandr 'Sasha' Pechersky	Television film Golden Globe Award for Best Supporting Actor – Series, Miniseries or Television Film
1989	The Edge	Sheriff Abel	Television film
1990	Late Night with David Letterman	Himself	1 episode
1990	The Tonight Show starring Johnny Carson	Himself	1 episode
1991	The Law of the Desert	Tom Burton	3 episodes
1993	Blind Side	Jake Shell	Television film
1993	Voyage	Morgan Norvell	Television film
1994	Amelia Earhart: The Final Flight	Fred Noonan	Television film
1994	Fatherland	SS-Sturmbannführer Xavier March	Television film Nominated—Golden Globe Award for Best Actor – Miniseries or Television Film
1997	Lexx	Bog	Episode: "Eating Pattern"
1997	Hostile Waters	Captain Igor Britanov	Television film
1997	The Ruby Ring	Patrick Collins	Television film
1998	Merlin	King Vortigern	2 episodes
2000	The 10th Kingdom	Huntsman	4 episodes
2003	Alias	Anthony Geiger	Episode: "Phase One"
2003	Smallville	Morgan Edge	2 episodes
2004	Salem's Lot	Kurt Barlow	2 episodes
2005	The Poseidon Adventure	Bishop August Schmidt	Television film
2007	Starting Over	Peter Rossen	Television film
2008	The Prince of Motor City	William Hamilton	Pilot
2012	Métal Hurlant Chronicles	Kern	Episode: "Pledge of Anya"
2012	Michelangelo - Il cuore e la pietra	Michelangelo	Television film
2013	Flight of the Storks	Sanderson	Episode: "Part Two: Fall in Hell"
2013–2014	True Blood	Niall Brigant	6 episodes
2014	Wilfred	Dr. Grummons	Episode: "Answers"
2014	Francesco	Padre di Francesco	Television film
2015	Galavant	Kingsley	3 episodes
2015	The Last Kingdom	Ravn	Episode: #1.1
2017	Mata Hari	Stolbakken	3 episodes
2017–2019	Porters	Tillman	7 episodes
2018	Channel Zero: Butcher's Block	Joseph Peach	6 episodes

=== Video games ===
Year	Title	Voice role	Notes
2017	Observer	Detective Daniel Lazarski	
2019	Kingdom Hearts III	Master Xehanort	
2020	Observer: System Redux	Detective Daniel Lazarski	Remaster of Observer; Posthumous

=== Commercials ===
Year	Title	Notes
1987–1994	Guinness Pure Genius	Series of surrealist and humorous commercials.

=== Documentaries ===
Year	Title
2006	Blond, Blue Eyes
2024	Like Tears in Rain
