= Bezeten, Het Gat in de Muur =

- Directed by: Pim de la Parra
- Written by: Wim Verstappen; Pim de la Parra; Martin Scorsese
- Produced by: Dieter Geissler
- Starring: Alexandra Stewart; Dieter Geissler; Tom van Beek; Donald Jones
- Music by: Bernard Herrmann
- Distributed by: Scorpio Films-producties
- Release dates: 15 August 1969 (West Germany); 9 October 1969 (Netherlands)
- Running time: 91 minutes
- Countries: Netherlands; West Germany
- Language: English

Bezeten, Het Gat in de Muur is a 1969 Dutch film directed by Pim de la Parra and starring Alexandra Stewart and Dieter Geissler.

It was the first post-war collaboration with Germany, which financed most of the film. In contrast to Germany, the film was moderately visited in the Netherlands. As a screenwriter, then-unknown Martin Scorsese contributed to the film's script.

== Plot ==
A medical student in Amsterdam, when hanging a painting, drills too deep. This creates a hole through which he can see inside the neighbor's apartment. What goes on there makes him curious, especially when many young women come over and he sees a few things passing by on drugs. He gets help from his girlfriend, a journalist.

== Cast ==
- Dieter Geissler as Nils Janssen
- Tom van Beek as De Amerikaan (Petrucci)
- Alexandra Stewart as Marina
- Donald Jones as Otto Gabian
