= Mijn nachten met Susan, Olga, Julie, Piet en Sandra =

Mijn nachten met Susan, Olga, Albert, Julie, Piet & Sandra
- Film poster
- Directed by: Pim de la Parra
- Written by: Carel Donck; Charles Gormley; David Kaufman; Harry Kümel; Pim de la Parra
- Produced by: Wim Verstappen
- Starring: Willeke van Ammelrooy; Hans van der Gragt; Nelly Frijda; Jerry Brouer; Franulka Heyermans
- Cinematography: Marc Felperlaan
- Edited by: Jutta Brandstaedter
- Music by: Elisabeth Lutyens
- Production company: Scorpio Film Productions
- Distributed by: Actueel Film; Marron Films
- Release date: January 30, 1975 (Netherlands)
- Running time: 85 minutes
- Country: Netherlands
- Language: Dutch

Mijn nachten met Susan, Olga, Albert, Julie, Piet & Sandra is a 1975 Dutch erotic thriller film produced by Wim Verstappen, directed by Pim de la Parra and starring Willeke van Ammelrooy.

== Plot ==
Susan is a woman who lives on an idyllic farm, along with the sex-crazed young women Sandra, Olga, and Julie, and the unstable voyeur Albert. The film opens with two of Susan’s housemates, who are offered a ride by an older American man. While Sandra has sex with him in the car, Olga beats him to death with an empty bottle. The strange and underdeveloped neighbor Piet witnesses the two women dumping the body in a river. Meanwhile, Susan receives a visit from Anton, a man who has been instructed to take her to another address. However, Susan isn’t entirely sure she wants to go and offers Anton a place to stay at the farm until she has made her decision.

On his very first night, he is seduced by Sandra and Olga. Just as before, Olga wants to strike him with a blunt object while he is having sex with Sandra, but she manages to control herself. The next day, Anton grows closer to Susan. She tells him that she has been living on the farm for three years and that she took in the young girls out of loneliness. She also explains that Piet regularly walks through their garden, but that he wouldn’t hurt a fly. Susan is therefore surprised when Piet suddenly throws an empty liquor bottle through the window. Olga and Sandra recognize the bottle, along with the sunglasses Piet is wearing, as belonging to the man they recently murdered. To make matters worse, it turns out Albert is also aware of the murder, and he threatens to tell Susan the truth if they don’t put an end to the endless harassment directed at him. Albert was Susan’s lover for a year, but these days he regularly meets up with Julie in secret.

In the meantime, Susan and Anton become lovers. Susan shares her deepest secrets with him, but the next day she keeps him at a distance, feeling guilty toward Albert. Confused, Anton leaves, after which he notices that Piet is hiding a body in her garden. This turns out to be Olga and Sandra's victim, whom Piet pulled from the water to tend to. After yet another round of harassment by Olga and Sandra, Piet vandalizes Susan’s farm. Anton links this act to the body and also suspects that this is the reason the farm has been visited by police officers on more than one occasion. He tries to find evidence and convince Susan of the crime, but she refuses to believe that Piet would blame the murder on her.

At the farm, Olga and Sandra discover that Albert has been spying on them for quite some time. Instead of getting angry, they get turned on, and they seduce him. Julie catches them and flies into a rage, after which she leaves the farm. Susan blames Olga and Sandra and kicks them out of the house. Not long after, she finds Albert’s body. She tries to find Anton to warn him and finds him in the barn, where he is attacked by Olga and Sandra after he confronted them about the murder of the American man. Anton and Susan manage to escape from the girls and decide the time is right to leave the farm for good. Piet takes care of Albert’s body and sets fire to the barn where Olga and Sandra are locked up.

== Cast ==
- Willeke van Ammelrooy as Susan
- Hans van der Gragt as Anton
- Nelly Frijda as Piet
- Marieke van Leeuwen as Julie
- Franulka Heyermans as Olga
