= Skoop =

Film magazine in the Netherland (1963–1993)

- Categories: Film magazine
- Publisher: Stichting Skoop
- Founded: 1963
- First issue: February 1963
- Final issue: 1993
- Country: Netherlands
- Based in: Amsterdam
- Language: Dutch
- ISSN: 0166-1736
- OCLC: 638828420

Skoop (English: Scope) was a film magazine which was published from 1963 to 1993 in Amsterdam, the Netherlands. It was one of the earliest publications on cinema and related topics in the country. The magazine contributed to the Dutch film industry in the 1960s and 1970s.

== History and profile ==
Skoop was established in 1963, and its first issue appeared in February of that year. Its founders were the students of the Netherlands Film Academy. Its editorial board members were Pim de la Parra, Wim Verstappen, Gied Jaspars and Nikolai van der Heyde. The magazine was published by Stichting Skoop based in Amsterdam.

Skoop targeted film experts, but had a critical approach towards the established film directors such as Bert Haanstra and film reviewers such as Janus van Domburg. From its first issue the magazine supported the non-traditional film criticism.

Skoop became one of the influential film magazines in the Netherlands in the 1980s and had a circulation of 12,500 copies. Another film magazine entitled Critisch Filmforum was merged with Skoop in 1969.

In addition to film reviews and other related material, Skoop conducted surveys one of which was about the choices of people who went to cinemas. The results of the survey were published in the February–March 1984 issue of the magazine.

Skoop folded in 1993.
