= Borger Breeveld =

Surinamese actor and television director (1944–2026)

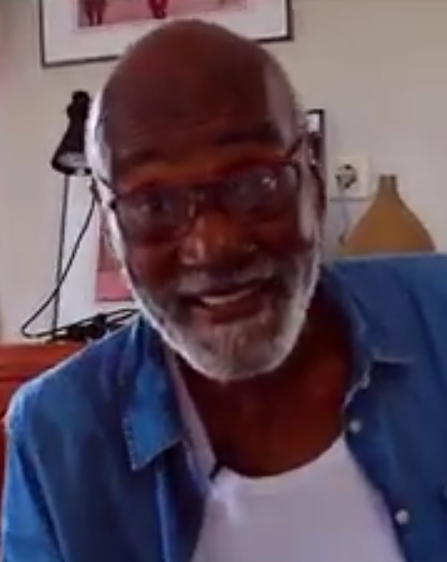
- Breeveld in 2021
- Born: 20 July 1944; Paramaribo, Surinam
- Died: 10 August 2026 (aged 82); Amsterdam, Netherlands
- Occupations: Actor, television director

Borger Breeveld (20 July 1944 – 10 August 2026) was a Surinamese actor and television director. He was the media manager at the Surinamese Television Foundation (STVS) and founder of Film Institute Paramaribo.

== Life and career ==
In the Surinamese-Dutch film Wan Pipel (1976), Breeveld starred as Roy Ferrol. In the 1980s, Breeveld was spokesman of Dési Bouterse. Together with Arie Verkuijl and Pim de la Parra, Breeveld established the Film Institute Paramaribo (FIP). He was the secretary of the foundation Surinamese Film Academy. At STVS, Breeveld operated as a television director which included current affairs program Mmanten Taki.

In December 2012, he starred, like his brothers Carl, Hans and Clarence and his sister Lucia, in the documentary Wan Famiri of the Dutch documentarian Geertjan Lassche. The family, however, distanced itself from the result. The focus would be on the December murders and Breeveld's friendly relations with main suspect Desi Bouterse, instead of the Breeveld family.

Breeveld died on 10 August 2026, at the age of 82.
