= Wilde Harten =

- Directed by: Jindra Markus
- Written by: Jindra Markus
- Produced by: Paul Voorthuysen, Rob Schreiner
- Cinematography: Peter de Bont
- Edited by: Henk Van Eeghen
- Music by: Michiel Jansen
- Distributed by: Concorde Film
- Release date: 1989
- Running time: 85 minutes
- Country: Netherlands
- Language: Dutch

Wilde Harten is a 1989 Dutch film directed by Jindra Markus. It was based on his own story. The film was distributed internationally under the title Wild Hearts.

== Cast ==
- Alexandra van Marken ... Alison
- Han Oldigs ... Quinten
- Herbert Flack ... Martin
- Wim van Rooij ... Primo
- Frank Schaafsma ... Tommie
- Joop Doderer ... Ormas
- Andrea Domburg ... Dora
- Tom de Ket ... Accomplice
- Yorick van Wageningen ... Accomplice
- Dries Smits ... Cabaret Singer
- René van Asten ... Cabaret Singer
- Fred Florusse ... Cabaret Singer
- Hein Boele ... Choreographer
- Tingue Dongelmans ... Nurse
- Ronald Beer ... Arts
