= De Dans van de Reiger =

1966 film

- Directed by: Fons Rademakers
- Written by: Hugo Claus (play and screenplay)
- Release date: 1966
- Running time: 92 minutes
- Country: Netherlands
- Language: Dutch

De Dans van de Reiger is a 1966 Dutch film directed by Fons Rademakers. It was adapted by Hugo Claus from his play of the same name.

== Plot ==
The rich and conservative Edward can not forgive his younger wife who had been unfaithful. She's trying to get his attention by flirting with a Dutch tourist.

== Cast ==
Gunnel Lindblom as Elena

Jean Desailly as Edouard

Van Doude as Paul, Nederlandse tourist

Mien Duymaer Van Twist as Moeder van Edouard

Jan Teulings as Vader van Edouard

Kitty Janssen as Moeder van Edouard (jong)

Manfred de Graaf as Manfred de Graaf
