= Clarence Breeveld =

Surinamese-born Dutch musician and educator

- Born: 11 September 1948; Nieuw-Nickerie, Suriname
- Died: 6 April 2017 (aged 68) Houten, Netherlands
- Genres: Kaseko; Gospel; Country

Clarence Breeveld (11 September 1948 – 6 April 2017) was a Surinamese-born Dutch singer, guitarist and educator.

== Biography ==
Breeveld was born on 11 September 1948 in Nieuw-Nickerie, Suriname. His parents were ministers of the Moravian Church. He started to work for Suralco (the Surinamese joint venture of Alcoa). He started performing music at the age of 13, and performed Kaseko, Gospel and Country music. In the mid 1960s, he won the Surinam Songfestival.

In 1970, Breeveld left for the Netherlands for his teaching degree, and started to work as a physics and chemistry teacher on vocational schools. Breeveld married Hannah Belliot with whom he had previously performed as Hannah en Clarence. In 1998, Belliot would become chairperson of the Amsterdam-Zuidoost borough. They would remain married for twenty years. He would also perform for The Spotlight and the Clarence Breeveld Formation.

In 2003, Breeveld and Frank Zichem made the documentary Katibo Ye Ye (the ghost of slavery) where he tried to find his roots by travelling to Ghana, and discover more about the African part of the Atlantic slave trade. On 12 February 2017, Breeveld performed his last concert, because he had been diagnosed terminally ill. At the concert, he was decorated Commander of the Honorary Order of the Yellow Star.

Breeveld died on 6 April 2017 in Houten, at the age of 68.

== Family ==
Clarence Breeveld is the brother of Hans, Carl and Borger Breeveld. On 13 December 2012, Wan Famiri, a television documentary about how the family managed to stay close despite significant political differences, was aired on Dutch television. After the broadcast, the family distanced themselves, because the documentary was mainly about the December murders and contained very little about the Breeveld family.
