= Rubia's Jungle =

- Directed by: Pim de la Parra
- Written by: Charles Gormley, Pim de la Parra
- Produced by: Wim Verstappen
- Release date: 1970
- Running time: minutes
- Country: Netherlands
- Language: Dutch

Rubia's Jungle is a 1970 Dutch film directed by Pim de la Parra.
