= The Knife (1961 film) =

1961 film

- Directed by: Fons Rademakers
- Written by: Hugo Claus
- Based on: "The Knife"; by Hugo Claus
- Produced by: Joop Landré; Karel Logher
- Starring: Ellen Vogel; Reitze van der Linden; Marie-Louise Videc; Paul Cammermans
- Cinematography: Eduard van der Enden
- Edited by: Henri Rust
- Music by: Pim Jacobs
- Production company: Nederlandse Filmproductie Maatschappij
- Release date: 2 March 1961
- Running time: 89 minutes
- Country: Netherlands
- Language: Dutch

The Knife (Dutch: Het Mes) is a 1961 Dutch drama film directed by Fons Rademakers. It is based on the short story of the same name by Hugo Claus from his collection The Black Emperor. Claus also wrote the screenplay for the film. The Knife is a coming-of-age story about Thomas, a thirteen-year-old boy who has a contentious relationship with his mother and starts to have conflicting feelings about his female friend, Toni.

The film was entered into the 1961 Cannes Film Festival where it competed for the Palme d'Or.

== Plot ==
Thomas is a 13-year-old boy in Limburg who lives with his mother. Since his father's death, his mother has begun a relationship with Oscar, his dad's best friend. This drives a wedge between mother and son, who thinks his mother is trying to replace his dad with Oscar. At an exhibition at a monastery, Thomas steals an antique knife. He shows it to Toni, his female friend, to impress her. Thomas uses the knife to intimidate Oscar, which ends up landing Thomas into trouble and results in Oscar confiscating the weapon.

After this incident, the mother tells Thomas he will be sent to boarding school at the end of the summer. Thomas spends the remainder of his summer days with Toni, visiting the fair and a territory owned by young people called De Valken. On their first visit to De Valken, Thomas is publicly humiliated by other boys. Thomas vows to get revenge with his knife, which he sneaks back into his possession. Meanwhile, Oscar's relationship with the mother has become strained, and Oscar's many evenings spent at the local pub starts to give the couple a bad reputation.

On the second visit to De Valken, Thomas and Toni witness a sexual assault. Toni is repulsed by what she saw, but Thomas is fascinated by it. When Toni confronts Thomas about it, he playfully threatens her with his knife. One evening, Thomas witnesses an argument between his mother and Oscar. No longer wanting to live in the house, Thomas runs away and spends the night in a barn. He has a dream where his father shoots him. The next day, Thomas is reluctantly brought back home by a villager.

Back at home, the mother apologizes to Thomas for abandoning him. She reasons he is too young to understand why he is being sent away, but suggests it has to do with Oscar. A few days later, Thomas leaves for boarding school. On the road, he says in a voice-over that he is ready for the next phase of his life and that he has outgrown Toni and the knife.

== Cast ==
- Reitze van der Linden as Thomas
- Marie-Louise Videc as Toni
- Ellen Vogel as Thomas' mother
- Paul Cammermans as Oscar
- Guus Hermus as Thomas' father
- Cor Witschge as Ratte, the soldier
- Hetty Beck as Marie
- Mia Goossen as Toni's mother

== Production ==
Fons Rademakers commissioned producer Joop Landré to make an adaptation of Hugo Claus's novella, thinking "it was very poetic". Rademakers ended up contacting the writer himself, who was residing in New Orleans at the time. Claus immediately set to work on the screenplay, which he completed in two weeks.

== Reception ==
The film was well received by the Dutch press. A reviewer from Het Vrije Volk wrote, "The Knife is without a doubt the best film that has ever left our studios". The film also received acclaim at the 1961 Cannes Film Festival. At Film Week Arnhem, The Knife was proclaimed the best Dutch feature film since World War II by the Dutch Cinema Association and was awarded the Silver Rose. The film was not a commercial success, which film historians attribute to its "poetic [subject] matter".
