= All Things Pass =

- Written by: Gerard Soeteman
- Directed by: Paul Verhoeven
- Country of origin: Netherlands
- Original language: Dutch

Production
- Producer: Joop van den Ende
- Running time: 65 minutes

Original release
- Release: 3 May 1981

All Things Pass (Dutch: Voorbij, voorbij; literally "Gone, gone") is a 1981 television film directed by Paul Verhoeven. In Douglas Keesey's book on Verhoeven, he writes that the film is a coda to Verhoeven's previous film Soldier of Orange (1977).

== Plot ==
It concerns several Dutch resistance fighters 35 years after World War II who have sworn revenge on a Dutch SS officer who shot their friend during the Netherlands' resistance to Nazi occupation. Upon finding the man, they discover that he is now paralysed and would suffer more to stay alive than be killed.

== Cast ==
- André van den Heuvel-Ab
- Piet Römer-Gerben
- Hidde Maas-Arie
- Guus Oster-Ben
- Jan Retèl-Cees
- Jan Staal-Niels
- Leontien Ceulemans-Tine
- Andrea Domburg-Dorien
- Lous Hensen-Lenie
- Simone Kleinsma-Tourguide
- Diane Lensink-Carrie
- Riek Schagen- The wife of Niels
- Maarten Spanjer-Jogger

== Release ==
Although the film was shot in 1979, the first broadcast took place 2 years later. The KRO aired the film on May 3, 1981. According to screenwriter Gerard Soeteman, the reason for this was that it was decided to give priority to the feature film Spetters first. As a result, this film remained unedited for 2 years.
