= Spy in the Sky! =

1958 film by W. Lee Wilder

- Directed by: W. Lee Wilder
- Written by: Myles Wilder
- Based on: Counterspy Express by Albert Sidney Fleischman
- Produced by: W. Lee Wilder
- Starring: Steve Brodie; Andrea Domburg; George Coulouris
- Cinematography: Walter J. Harvey
- Edited by: Lien d' Oliveyra; Loet Roozekrans
- Music by: Hugo de Groot
- Production company: W. Lee Wilder Productions
- Distributed by: Associated British-Pathé (UK); Allied Artists Pictures (US)
- Release date: 20 July 1958
- Running time: 75 minutes
- Countries: United Kingdom; United States
- Language: English

Spy in the Sky! is a 1958 American-British spy thriller film directed by W. Lee Wilder and starring Steve Brodie, Andrea Domburg and George Coulouris. It was written by Myles Wilder based on the 1954 novel Counterspy Express by Albert Sidney Fleischman.

== Plot ==
A German scientist who knows the secrets of the Sputnik rocket programme goes on the run from the Soviets.

== Cast ==
- Steve Brodie as Vic Cabot
- Sandra Francis as Eve Brandisi
- Andrea Domburg as Alexandrine Duvivier
- George Coulouris as Col. Benedict
- Bob De Lange as Sidney Jardine
- Hans Tiemeijer as Dr. Fritz Keller, alias Hans Krauss
- Herbert Curiel as Pepi Vidor
- Dity Oorthuis as Fritzi
- Albert E. Gollin as Martin, consul's representative
- Leon Dorian as Agent Max Maxwell
- Roland Wagter as soldier
- Monica Witkowna as gypsy singer
- Harold Horsten as pawnbroker

== Production ==
The film was shot at the Cinetone Studios in Amsterdam and on location in Vienna.

== Reception ==
The Monthly Film Bulletin wrote: "This story is full of complications which scarcely compensate for the lengths to which the basically simple plot is stretched. A weak script gives the cast very little opportunity for performances, and in the circumstances they make their parts as credible as could be expected."

Variety wrote: "It is a routine spy story of poor quality that will be adequate in U.S. only for lower case double-bill bookings. ...The cast performs adequately under Wiider's direction, but not to any advantage, their own or the picture's. The continuity is confusing and finally annoying. The photography, by Jim Harvey, is often interesting, but it has a curious composition. It consists almost entirely of medium close-ups, two or three-shots, and closeups, indicating it was shot with television, not feature picture release in mind. Very little advantage is taken of the foreign location."
