= Frank en Eva =

1973 film

- Film poster
- Directed by: Pim de la Parra
- Produced by: Pim de la Parra; Wim Verstappen
- Starring: Willeke van Ammelrooy; Hugo Metsers; Lex Goudsmit
- Music by: Antoine Duhamel
- Production company: Scorpio Film Productions
- Distributed by: Actueel Film
- Release dates: 23 August 1973 (Netherlands); 1 March 1973 (US)
- Running time: 105 minutes
- Country: Netherlands
- Language: Dutch

Frank en Eva (English release title: Living Apart Together) is a 1973 Dutch film which features the debut performance of Sylvia Kristel.

It was released in France in 1977 and recorded admissions of 193,473.
