= Jan Teulings =

Dutch actor (1905–1989)

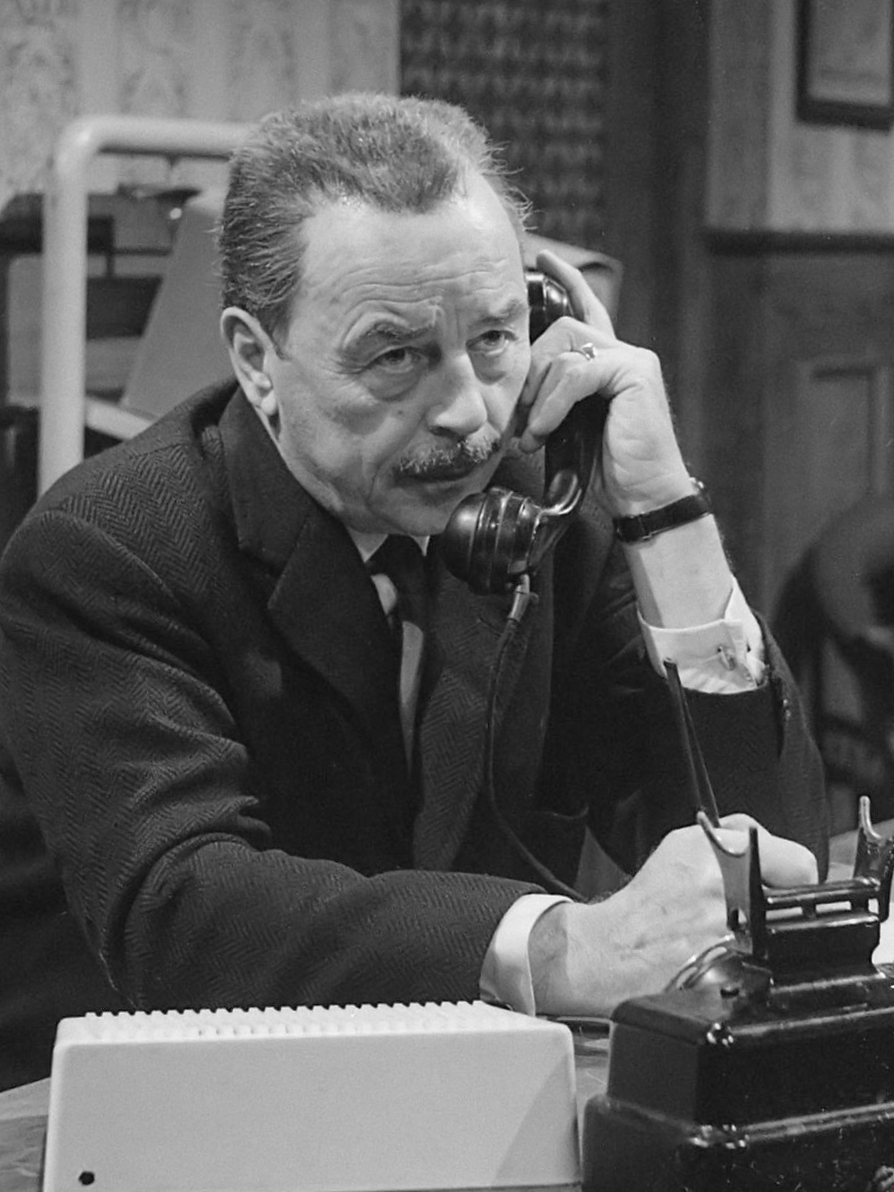
- Portaying Inspector Maigret
- Born: 29 May 1905; Hilversum, Netherlands
- Died: 22 September 1989 (aged 84); Rotterdam
- Occupation: Actor
- Years active: 1936–1987

Johannes Marinus Antonius (Jan) Teulings (29 May 1905 – 22 September 1989) was a Dutch actor. He appeared in more than thirty films from 1936 to 1987.

== Filmography ==
Year	Title	Role	Notes
1936	Lentelied	Frans Vermeer	
1936	Klokslag twaalf		
1937	The Three Wishes	Tino Murante, Maria's Vriend	
1950	De Dijk is Dicht	Simon	
1955	Ciske de Rat	Henri - vriendje van Moeder	
1958	The Village on the River	Burgemeester	
1960	Makkers Staakt uw Wild Geraas	De heer Keizer	
1964	Les plus belles escroqueries du monde	Dutch man	
1966	De Dans van de Reiger	Vader van Edouard	
1967-69	Maigret	Jules Maigret	12 episodes
1972	Jonny en Jessy	Jonny's oom	
1975	Heb medelij, Jet!	Oom	
