= Ellen Vogel =

Dutch actress (1922–2015)

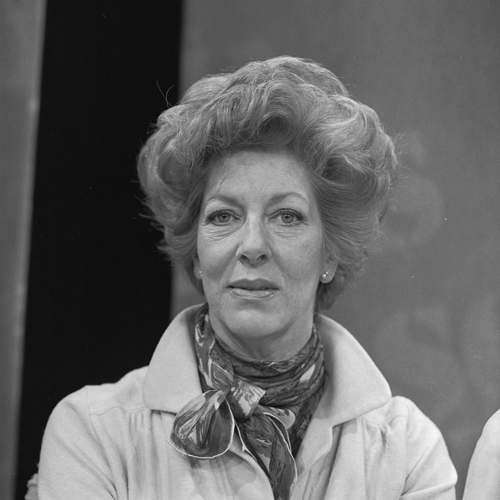
- Ellen Vogel in 1976
- Born: Ellen Marie Elze Vogel; 26 January 1922; The Hague, Netherlands
- Died: 5 August 2015 (aged 93); Amsterdam, Netherlands
- Occupation: Actress
- Years active: 1945–2013
- Spouses: Hans Jürgen Tobi (m. 1942; div. 1949) Fons Rademakers (m. 1953; div. 1957) Joan James Charles Maria Joseph Münninghoff (m. 1976; died 2012)
- Children: Peter Paul Tobi (born 1946)
- Parent(s): Albert Vogel Sr. (father); Ellen Buwalda (mother)
- Relatives: Tanja Vogel (sister); Albert Vogel Jr. (brother)

Ellen Marie Elze Anthing Vogel (Dutch pronunciation: [ˈɛlə(m) maːˈri ˈɛlzə ˈʔɑntɪŋ ˈvoːɣəl]; 26 January 1922 – 5 August 2015) was a Dutch film, stage and television actress.

== Personal ==
Born on 26 January 1922 in The Hague, Netherlands as the second child of publicist Louis Albert Anthing Vogel (1874–1933) and Ellen Buwalda (1890-1985), Her older sister Pauline Berthe Theodore "Tanja" Anthing Vogel (1919–1997) was the owner of a ballet studio in Wassenaar, and her younger brother, Albert Theodore Leonard Carel Anthing Vogel Jr. (1924-1982), was an actor.

In 1942, aged 20, Vogel married Hans Jürgen Tobi (born 16 April 1916 in Dortmund, German Empire) they had one son Peter Paul Tobi (born 2 October 1946). The couple divorced in October 1949, Hans Jürgen Tobi died on 18 April 2000 in Gorssel, Netherlands, aged 84. Vogel later remarried to Dutch filmmaker and actor Fons Rademakers from 1953 to 1957. In 1976, she married, thirdly, to Jimmy Münninghoff (25 September 1925, Riga – 7 June 2012, Amsterdam).

Ellen Vogel died on 5 August 2015 in Amsterdam at the age of 93.

== Filmography ==
| Year | Title | Role | Notes |
|---|---|---|---|
| 1960 | Makkers Staakt uw Wild Geraas | Norah Leegher-Buwalda | |
| 1961 | The Knife | Thomas' Moeder | |
| 1969 | Monsieur Hawarden | Monsieur Hawarden / Meriora Gillibrand | |
| 1975-1976 | Van oude mensen, de dingen die voorbijgaan | Ina | 7 episodes |
| 1983 | Brandende liefde | Jannie Bonnema-French teacher | |
| 1983-1984 | Herenstraat 10 | Emmy van Laar | 7 episodes |
| 1984 | Willem van Oranje | Juliana van Stolberg | 7 episodes |
| 1985 | Paul Chevrolet en de ultieme hallucinatie | Elizabeth | |
| 1986 | Als in een Roes | Agatha van Avezaat | |
| 1992-1998 | Zonder Ernst | Frederique Asselberg | 6 episodes |
| 2001 | The Discovery of Heaven | Max's Mother | |
| 2002 | De Tweeling | Lotte senior | |
| 2005 | Masterclass | | |
| 2010 | Bernhard, schavuit van Oranje | Juliana | 4 episodes |
| 2012 | Beatrix, Oranje onder vuur | Juliana | 3 episodes |

== Awards and honours ==
- Knight of the Order of the Crown (Belgium, 1959)
- Knight of the Order of the Netherlands Lion (Netherlands, 1995)
