= Gied Jaspars =

Dutch television producer (1939–1996)

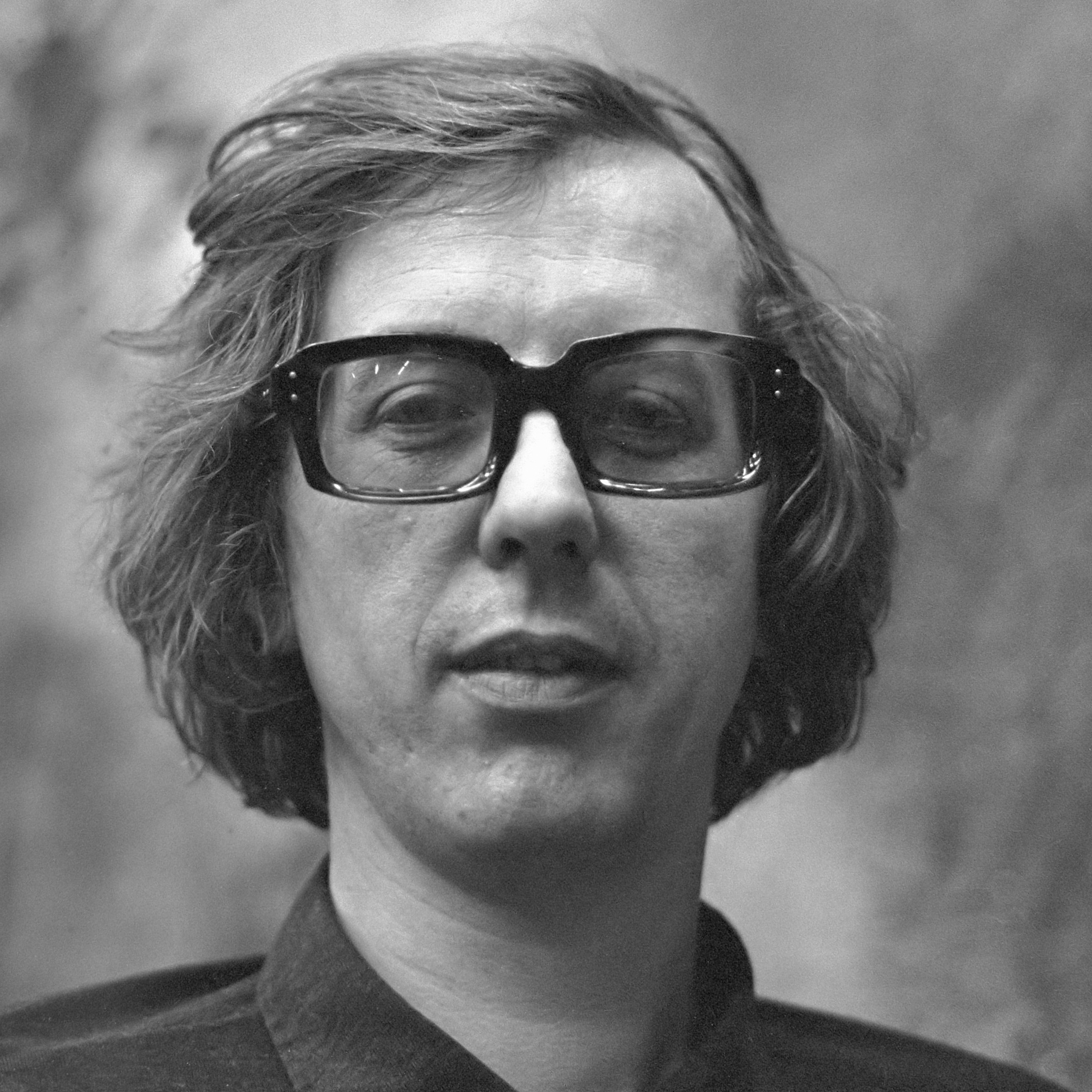
- Gied Jaspars in 1973
- Born: July 6, 1939; Gronsveld, Netherlands
- Died: February 14, 1996 (aged 56)

Gied Jaspars (6 July 1939 – 14 February 1996) was a Dutch television maker who gained prominence in the 1960s and 1970s making progressive and controversial TV shows for the VPRO; he is well known for his collaboration with writer and director Wim T. Schippers. After he left the television and film industry he started a career as a business man; throughout his career he had a great interest in nature, expressed in narrative, meditative reflections in television and radio series which were later bundled as a single collection.

== Biography ==
=== Television ===
Jaspars was born in Gronsveld, and studied at the Filmacademie in Amsterdam. In 1963 he was the founder, with Nikolai van der Heyde and Pim de la Parra, of the movie magazine Skoop. His career as a television producer took off in 1967 when he was part of the team (with Wim T. Schippers) that made the groundbreaking show Hoepla for the VPRO, possibly the most controversial TV program of the 1960s and the first program to have a completely naked woman (Phil Bloom) on television, even leading to questions being asked in parliament. Jaspars went on to collaborate with Schippers (who referred to Jaspars as his "soundboard"), Wim van der Linden, and Ruud van Hemert on other shows, including De Fred Hachéshow (1972), Barend is weer bezig (1972–1973), and Het is weer zo laat! (1978), and he produced the Schippers play Going to the Dogs (1986). He also produced popular programs such as the BB-kwis (with Berend Boudewijn), Sonja's goed nieuwsshow (with Sonja Barend), and Waar gebeurd (in which people were allowed to tell the craziest stores, made with Paul Haenen). For VPRO radio he directed, in 1981, a show dedicated to a "shameful night of love", in which radio hosts talked to listeners about their love lives; in between, Jaspars read passages from Goethe's The Sorrows of Young Werther. In 1981-1982 he produced and narrated a series of segments that closed the day's shows, in collaboration with the nature preservation society Natuurmonumenten. In 1984 he produced Een dagje naar het strand, directed by Theo van Gogh.

=== Inventions ===
After his television career he was active as a business man selling inventions, developing a storage system (with Samuel Meyering), the Rolykit, which made him almost a millionaire. Working with a collective of inventors they had made a revolutionary caster, but he was unable to bring it to market since he didn't succeed in getting it patented.

=== Nature and radio ===
As he got older, he became more and more interested in making nature his profession. A lifelong lover of nature and an avid walker, at age 50 he turned himself into a storyteller, making radio shows for the VPRO about his fascination with nature and his youth in Limburg; he is praised for his narrative talent and poetic style, displayed also in the 1992-1993 eight-part series Ontmoetingen in de natuur in which Jaspars recounted episodes from his childhood, followed by an eight-part series in 1994, Gied Jaspars vertelt. At around the same time Frans Bromet (a friend with whom he had studied at the Filmacademie) worked on a television series on Jaspars, Het leven van Gied Jaspars, as an homage; Jaspars, diagnosed with bowel cancer, and spent two years undergoing surgery and chemotherapy (which he discussed in Vinger aan de pols, a medical television show), but had learned recently that the end was near. He spoke at length on his passion for the outdoors and his love of Dutch landscape in an interview with Frank Flippo in the walkers magazine Te Voet six months before he died. The collection Mijmeringen anthologizes some of his best radio narrations done for the VPRO and the VARA.

Jaspars died of bowel cancer, at age 56.
