= Jenny (1958 film) =

- Directed by: Willy van Hemert
- Written by: Erich Waschneck (screenplay) & Hanns H. Fischer (writer)
- Release date: 21 February 1958
- Running time: 98 minutes
- Country: Netherlands
- Language: Dutch

Jenny is a 1958 Dutch film directed by Willy van Hemert. It is a remake of the 1932 German film Eight Girls in a Boat. The movie is known as the first Dutch film in color.

The film is about Jenny, a happy 18-year-old girl who loves rowing. She gets unexpectedly pregnant by her boyfriend Ed, who then leaves her. She must make a difficult decision, but everything comes to good ends.

== Cast ==
- Ellen van Hemert ... Jenny Roders
- Maxim Hamel ... Ed van Rijn
- Andrea Domburg ... Greet
- Kees Brusse ... Dr. Henk Ebeling
- Ko van Dijk ... Meneer Roders (as Ko van Dijk jr.)
- Teddy Schaank ... Mevrouw Gonzales
- Bert van der Linden ... Kees
- Nell Knoop
