= Makkers Staakt uw Wild Geraas =

1960 film

- Directed by: Fons Rademakers
- Written by: Fons Rademakers; Jan Blokker; Lili Rademakers
- Produced by: Joop Landre
- Starring: Ellen Vogel
- Cinematography: Eduard van der Enden
- Edited by: Henri Rust
- Release date: 28 October 1960
- Running time: 97 minutes
- Country: Netherlands
- Language: Dutch

Makkers Staakt uw Wild Geraas is a 1960 Dutch drama film directed by Fons Rademakers. It was entered into the 11th Berlin International Film Festival, where it won the Silver Bear Award.

== Plot ==
The film centers around three families celebrating Sinterklaas in Amsterdam. The first one is a couple who just divorced. The second family has a teenage son going through puberty who badly reacts to everything. The third family has problems celebrating the feast inside their own home.

== Cast ==
- Ellen Vogel as Norah Leegher-Buwalda
- Guus Hermus as De heer Leegher
- Ank van der Moer as Mevrouw Keizer
- Jan Teulings as De heer Keizer
- Yoka Berretty as Mevrouw Lomijn
- Guus Oster as De heer Lomijn
- Mieke Verstraete as Emma
- Ina van Faassen
- Manfred de Graaf
- Ton van Duinhoven
- Leontine Van Strein
