= Simon Hammelburg =

Dutch journalist, composer and author

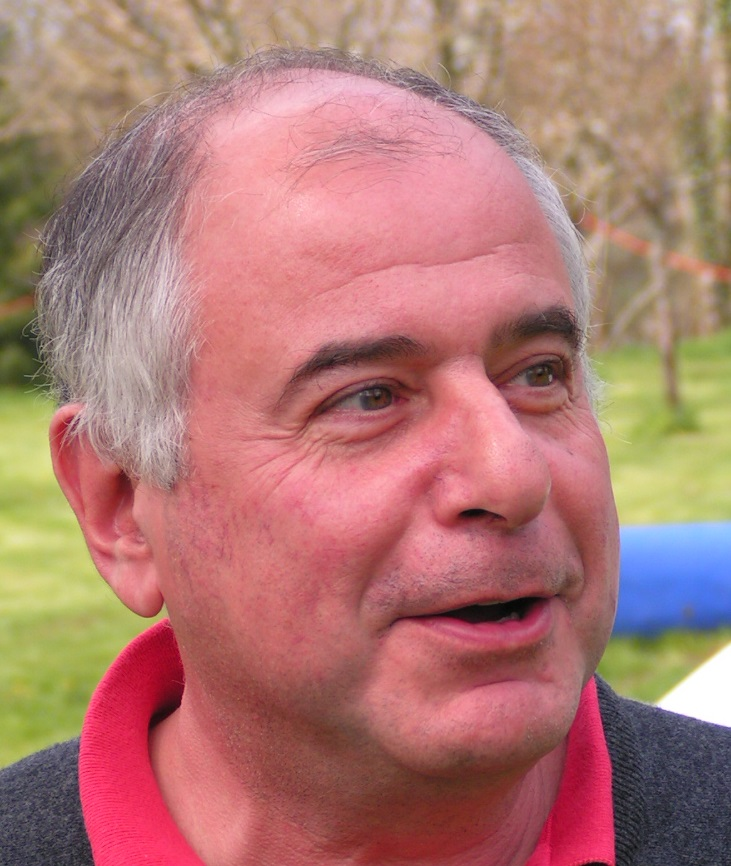
- Simon Hammelburg

Background information
- Born: 28 February 1952 (age 73)
- Origin: Amsterdam, Netherlands
- Occupations: Journalist, author, songwriter, entertainer
- Website: simonhammelburg.com

Simon Hammelburg (Amsterdam, February 28, 1952 – Marbella, June 15, 2022) was a Dutch entertainer, songwriter, journalist, and Holocaust educator. He died in Marbella 15 June 2022.

Prior to the first Gulf War (1991) Hammelburg produced the video Shalom from Holland with director Ralph Inbar and film maker Floris Sijbesma, as a token of solidarity to the Israeli people who were threatened by missiles fired from Iraq. Among the performing singers and musicians were George Baker, Joe Bourne, Adèle Bloemendaal, Ruud Bos, Marco Borsato, Ted de Braak, Jaap Dekker, Lex Goudsmit, Donald Jones, Caroline Kaart, Ben Cramer, Lenny Kuhr, Thijs van Leer, Donna Lynton, Maggie MacNeal, Harry Sacksioni and Daniël Wayenberg. Hammelburg co-wrote the song with Ron Klipstein. With Inbar and Sijbesma, he received an award by the Knesset.

Hammelburg co-authored Mijn Jodendom (‘My Judaism’) and wrote Kaddisj voor Daisy (1996) and Broken on the inside - The war never ended (Aerial Media 2014), based on 1200 interviews with Holocaust survivors and their children, providing insights into the traumas of the first and post-war generations of Holocaust victims. The interviews were made during a campaign to help American Jews and other individuals file claims for property they lost during the Nazi era in what was to become East Germany.

== Bibliography ==
- Mijn Jodendom (co-author), J.N. Voorhoeve, The Hague, 1980
- Kaddisj voor Daisy: Herinneringen van holocaust-overlevenden en hun kinderen, Kok, Kampen, 1996
- The War never Ended, Amsterdam Publishers, 2014
- Broken on the inside - The war never ended, Aerial Media Company, 2014 (reprint: Aspekt, Soesterberg, 2018)
- Van binnen is alles stuk: Herinneringen van vernielde generaties, (Dutch adaptation of Broken on the inside), Aerial Media Company, 2014 (reprint: Aspekt, Soesterberg, 2018)
- Het voorgesprek, Aspekt, Soesterberg, 2017
- Ons Jodendom (co-author), Uitgeverij Ipenburg, Elburg, 2017
