= Een dagje naar het strand =

1984 Dutch film

- Directed by: Theo van Gogh
- Written by: Theo van Gogh, Heere Heeresma (novel)
- Produced by: Gied Jaspars
- Starring: Cas Enklaar; Tara Fallaux
- Music by: Willem van Ekeren
- Production companies: Cooperatieve Vereniging Rust & Vreugd
- Release date: 27 September 1984
- Running time: 85 minutes
- Country: Netherlands
- Language: Dutch

Een dagje naar het strand (Dutch pronunciation: [ən ˈdɑxjə naːr ət ˈstrɑnt]; A Little Day at the Beach) is a 1984 Dutch film directed by Theo van Gogh, based on a 1962 book by Dutch author Heere Heeresma. The soundtrack was made by Willem van Ekeren. The 1970 film A Day at the Beach is also based on the book by Heeresma, in cooperation with Roman Polanski.

== Plot ==
The plot is about Bernard and his daughter Walijne. Bernard takes her for a day at the beach in Scheveningen, but his drinking problem eventually turns out to be the factor that doesn't make the day as fun as it was supposed to be.

== Cast ==
- Cas Enklaar as Bernard
- Tara Fallaux as Walijne
- Helen Hedy as Medusa
- Emile Fallaux as Carl
- Jojet Mulder as the Lady in the elevator
- Henk Laan as Louis
- Bill Wiggers as Lelieveld
- Hans Franzen as Fisherman
- Iet van Ringen as Lady
- Heere Heeresma Narrator (voice)
