= Ik zou je het liefste in een doosje willen doen =

Song performed by Donald Jones

"Ik zou je het liefste in een doosje willen doen" (Dutch pronunciation: [ɪk ˈsʌu jə ɦət ˈlifstə ʔɪn ən ˈdoːɕə ˌʋɪlə(n) ˈdun]; "I'd like to put you in a box") is a 1959 Dutch song written by Annie M.G. Schmidt (lyrics) and Cor Lemaire (music) for the 1950s television show Pension Hommeles. The song describes a man who loves his partner so much that he would like to keep her in a little box. Sung by Donald Jones, it was a hit and helped propel Jones to stardom. The song remains a standard in Dutch cabaret and musical comedy.

The song is one of Annie M.G. Schmidt's most popular tunes, and provided the title for a theater show about Schmidt (who died in 1995) that celebrates her 100th anniversary and contain 26 of her most beloved songs. Ostensibly, the title is based on a phrase that Schmidt's mother used to say to her daughter.
