= Willeke van Ammelrooy =

Dutch actress (born 1944)

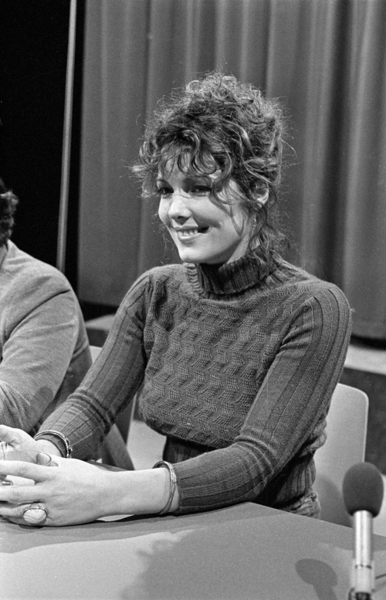
- Willeke van Ammelrooy in 1973
- Born: Willy Geertje van Ammelrooij; 5 April 1944 (age 82); Amsterdam, Netherlands
- Occupations: Actress, Director
- Years active: 1966–present
- Website: Official website

Willy Geertje van Ammelrooij (born 5 April 1944), known as Willeke van Ammelrooy, is a Dutch actress.

== Life and career ==
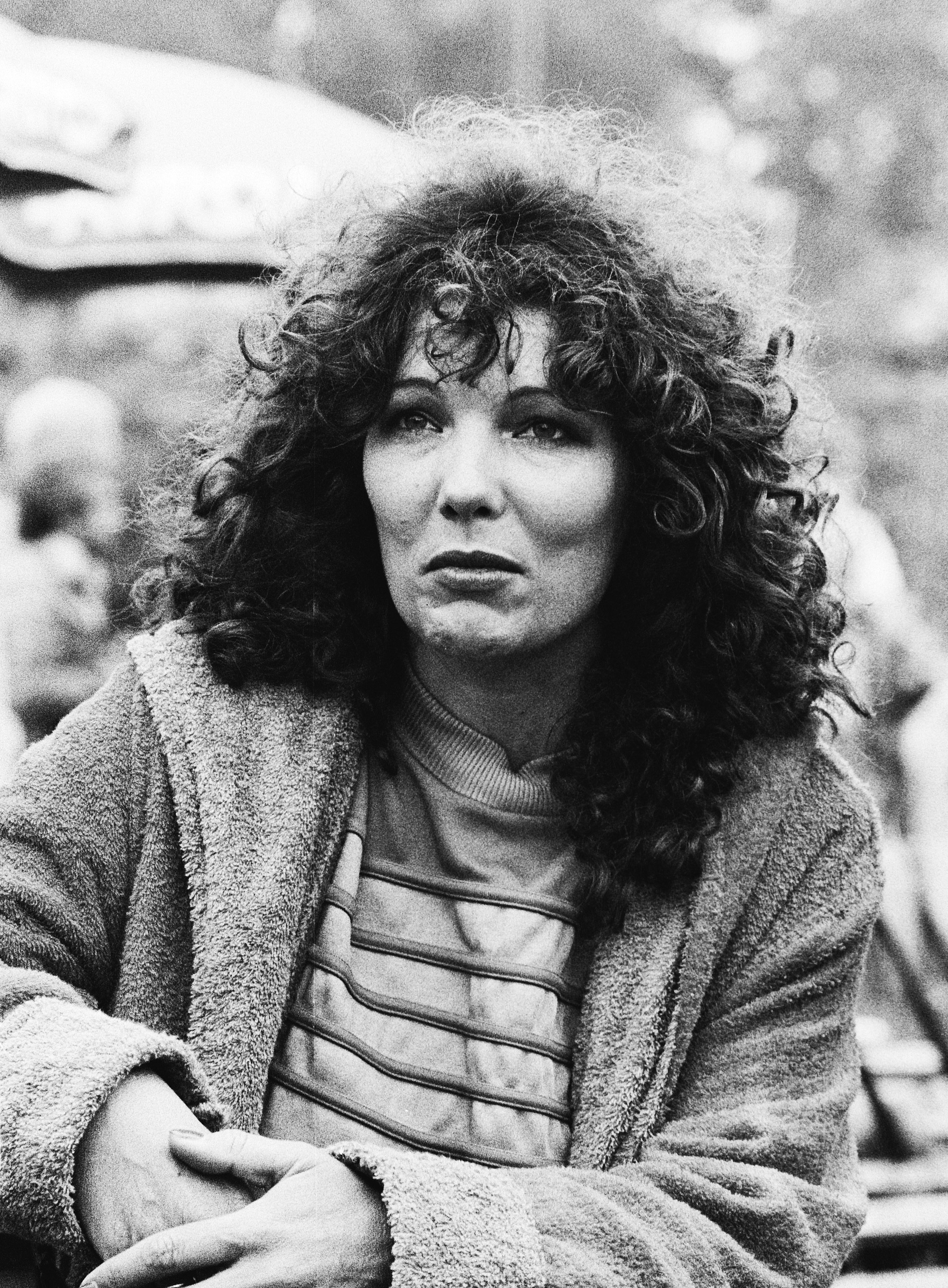
Willeke van Ammelrooy in 1980

Willeke van Ammelrooy was born in Amsterdam, where she also attended drama school. She has acted on stage as well as in films. She participated in 27 movies. Her first film was Mira in 1971.

=== Success with Antonia's Line ===
She later starred in the award-winning feminist film Antonia's Line, which tells the story of an independent woman who, after returning to the anonymous Dutch village of her birth, establishes and nurtures a close-knit matriarchal community.

She received positive reviews and the Golden Calf for Best Actress for her performance and the film enjoyed critical success, including the Academy Award for Best Foreign Language Film at the 68th Academy Awards. Emanuel Levy, writing for The Advocate, wrote "It's easy to see why" the film was winning awards in festivals, calling it "an enchanting fairy tale that maintains a consistently warm, lighthearted feel," and Willeke van Ammelrooy wonderful. Janet Maslin of The New York Times called it "a work of magical feminism." The film also screened at the Toronto International Film Festival, where it won the People's Choice Award.

According to Box Office Mojo, the film completed its run grossing $4,228,275 in North America, 1,660,901 admissions in the European Union, and $21,046 in South Korea.

=== Other work ===
In 2017, van Ammelrooy was announced as a member of the film jury for ShortCutz Amsterdam, an annual film festival promoting short films in Amsterdam.

== Personal life ==
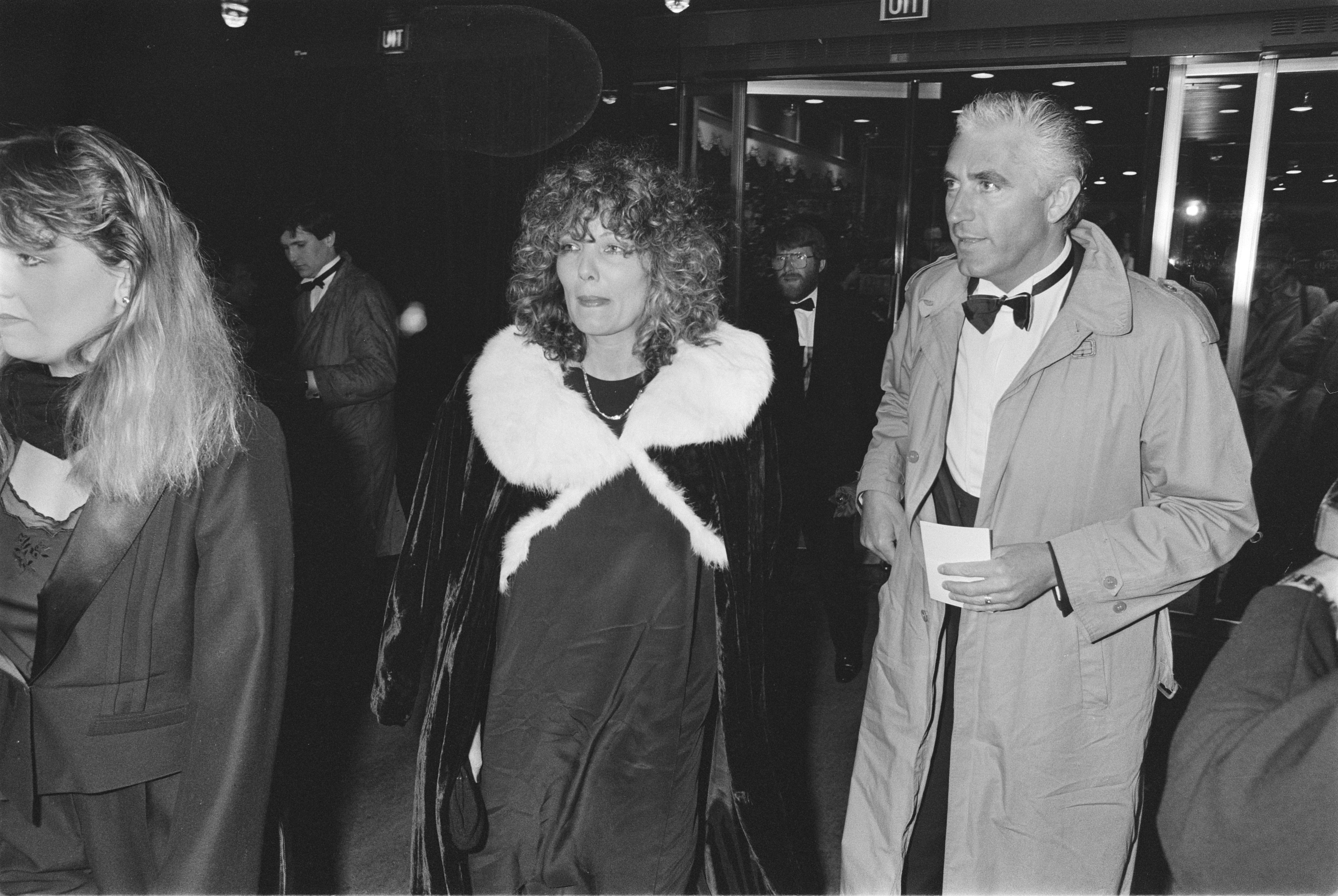
Willeke van Ammelrooy with her husband Marco Bakker in 1984

Van Ammelrooy is married to the Dutch opera singer Marco Bakker.

== Filmography ==
=== Film ===
- Mira (1971) – Mira
- Louisa, een woord van liefde (1972) – Louisa
- The Burglar (1972) – Fanny
- The Killer Is on the Phone (1972) – Dorothy
- Frank en Eva (1973) – Eva
- Dakota (1974) – Laura
- Help! The Doctor Is Drowning (1974) – Katja
- Alicia (1974) – Alicia
- Mijn nachten met Susan, Olga, Julie, Piet en Sandra (1975) – Susan
- L'amour aux trousses (1975) – Laurence
- Het Jaar van de Kreeft (1975) – Toni
- Wan Pipel (1976) – Karina
- De Mantel der Liefde (1978) – Maria
- Grijpstra & De Gier (1979) – Constanze
- Een vlucht regenwulpen (1981) – Martha
- On Top of the Whale (1982) – Eva
- De Lift (1983) – Mieke
- Herenstraat 10 (1983) – Leonie
- Ciske de Rat (1984) – Marie
- Andre Handles Them All (1985) – Charlie
- Op hoop van zegen (1986) – Mathilde
- Koko Flanel (1990) – Germaine
- Antonia's Line (1995) – Antonia
- Lijmen/Het Been (2001) – Mrs. Lauwereyssen
- De Schippers van de Kameleon (2003) – Mevrouw
- De duistere diamant (2004) – Clara
- The Lake House (2006) – Mrs. Forster
- Bride Flight (2008) – Old Esther Cahn
- The Hell of '63 (2009) – Moeder Will
- Life Is Wonderful (2018) – Rosa

=== Television ===
- Het Glazen Huis (2004–2005)
