= Lentelied =

1936 film

- Directed by: Simon Koster
- Written by: Simon Koster
- Release date: March 5, 1936
- Running time: 75 minutes
- Country: Netherlands
- Language: Dutch

Lentelied is a 1936 Dutch film directed by Simon Koster.

== Cast ==
- Jan Teulings... Frans Vermeer
- Lau Ezerman ... Van Buren
- Ank van der Moer ... Charlotte van Buren
- Dick Swidde ... Bobby Bevering
- Jules Verstraete ... Willems
- Joke Bosch ... Marietje
- Julia Cuypers ... Waardin van Hotel 'De Zon'
- John Schilthuizen ... Jef
- Nell Knoop ... Juffrouw van der Linden
- Cor Hermus ... Matthijsen
