= Markenplein =

Square in Amsterdam, Netherlands

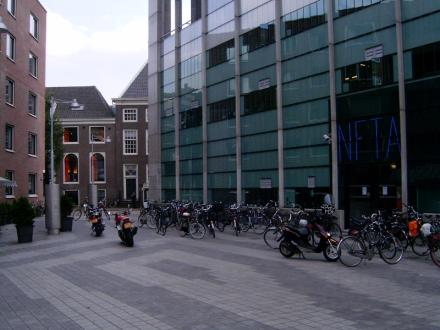
- Markenplein in 2006

- Location within Amsterdam
- Namesake: Marken
- Location: Centrum, Amsterdam, Netherlands
- Nearest metro station: Waterlooplein
- Coordinates: 52.3686°N 4.9053°E

Markenplein (Marken Square) is the name of a square in the centre of Amsterdam. Until 1970, it was called het oude Markenpleintje and before World War II it used to be a part of the Jewish district of Amsterdam. The name Markenplein symbolizes the bond between the new neighborhood and the old Jewish neighborhood.

The pavement pattern was designed by the American artist Sol LeWitt. The square houses the entrance of the Netherlands Film and Television Academy, the parking garage Markenhoven and the Grand Cafe Allure.
