= Woman Between Wolf and Dog =

1979 film

- Theatrical release poster
- Directed by: André Delvaux
- Written by: André Delvaux; Ivo Michiels
- Produced by: Nicolas Seydoux; Daniel Toscan du Plantier; Alain Poiré; Jean-Claude Batz; Danièle Delorme; Yves Robert
- Starring: Marie-Christine Barrault
- Cinematography: Charles Van Damme
- Edited by: Etienne Verschueren
- Distributed by: Gaumont Distribution
- Release date: 16 May 1979
- Running time: 111 minutes
- Countries: Belgium; France
- Language: Dutch

Woman Between Wolf and Dog (Dutch: Een vrouw tussen hond en wolf, French: Femme entre chien et loup), also known as Woman in a Twilight Garden, is a 1979 Belgian-French drama film directed by André Delvaux. It was entered into the 1979 Cannes Film Festival and received the André Cavens Award for Best Film by the Belgian Film Critics Association (UCC). The film was also selected as the Belgian entry for the Best Foreign Language Film at the 52nd Academy Awards, but was not accepted as a nominee.

== Cast ==
- Marie-Christine Barrault as Lieve
- Rutger Hauer as Adriaan
- Roger van Hool as François
- Senne Rouffaer as The Priest
- Bert André as Slager
- Raf Reymen as Oom Georges
- Hector Camerlynck as Uncle Odilon
- Mathieu Carrière as Soldier from Germany
- Yves Robert as Werkman
- Tine Balder as Tante Mélanie
- Jenny Tanghe as Tante Anna
- Greta van Langhendonck as Susanne
- Janine Bischops as Tante Leontien
- Johny Voners as Uncle Nand
- Marc Bober as Postbode
- Jean-Claude Van Damme as Movie Goer / Man In Garden (uncredited)

== See also ==
- Rutger Hauer filmography
- List of submissions to the 52nd Academy Awards for Best Foreign Language Film
- List of Belgian submissions for the Academy Award for Best Foreign Language Film
