= Myles Wilder =

American writer (1933–2010)

- Born: January 28, 1933; New York City
- Died: April 20, 2010 (aged 77); Temecula
- Occupations: television writer and producer
- Spouse: Bobbe Wilder (survives him)
- Father: W. Lee Wilder
- Relatives: Billy Wilder (uncle)

Myles Wilder (January 28, 1933 – April 20, 2010) was an American movie and television comedy writer and producer.

Wilder attended and graduated from UCLA's Theater Arts Department. During his senior year, he and two of his friends, Mitch Rose and Wayne Thoms, produced a documentary entitled "The Sports Car" that depicted the history of and interest in sports cars. He started writing in Hollywood in 1952 with Rebound. He wrote seven screenplays for film, with six of them being directed by his father W. Lee Wilder (1904–1982), the older brother of famous director Billy Wilder. Myles would write for a variety of shows over the next two decades, such as McHale's Navy, Korg: 70,000 B.C., and The Dukes of Hazzard. He also served as a script consultant on the television series Karen, producer of Hazzard and McDuff, the Talking Dog, and executive story consultant on programs like Hazzard, Hong Kong Phooey, and Devlin

== Filmography ==
Films written

- Phantom from Space (1953)
- Killers from Space (1954)
- The Snow Creature (1954)
- Fright (1956)
- Manfish (1956)
- Seven Guns to Mesa (1958)
- Spy in the Sky! (1958)

Television written

- Rebound (1952)
- Wagon Train (1960, 1961, 1963)
- Bluebeard's Ten Honeymoons (1960)
- Bonanza (1960)
- My Three Sons (1961, 1967)
- Bachelor Father (1961-1962)
- The Aquanauts (1961)
- The Real McCoys (1961)
- McHale's Navy (1963-1966)
- I'm Dickens, He's Fenster (1963)
- Karen (1964-1965)
- Broadside (1964-1965)
- Hank (1965)
- The Patty Duke Show (1965-1966)
- Tammy (1965)
- Vacation Playhouse (1965)
- Laredo (1966)
- Mona McCluskey (1966)
- Run, Buddy, Run (1966)
- The 38th Annual Academy Awards (1966)
- Gomer Pyle, U.S.M.C. (1967-1968)
- Get Smart (1967-1968)
- Mr. Terrific (1967)
- My Dog, the Thief (1969)
- The Doris Day Show (1969, 1972-1973)
- The Flying Nun (1969)
- The Ghost & Mrs. Muir (1969)
- The Tim Conway Comedy Hour (1970)
- The Brady Bunch (1970, 1972-1973)
- Here's Lucy (1970)
- The Tim Conway Show (1970)
- The Good Life (1971)
- The Paul Lynde Show (1972-1973)
- The Roman Holidays (1972)
- Wait Till Your Father Gets Home (1972)
- Butch Cassidy (1973)
- Inch High, Private Eye (1973)
- The Addams Family (1973)
- Temperatures Rising (1973)
- Korg: 70,000 B.C. (1974; creative consultant)
- Hong Kong Phooey (1974)
- Devlin (1974)
- Welcome Back, Kotter (1975, 1977)
- When Things Were Rotten (1975)
- McDuff, the Talking Dog (1976, also creator)
- Good Heavens (1976)
- The San Pedro Beach Bums (1977)
- C.P.O. Sharkey (1978)
- Diff'rent Strokes (1978)
- The Dukes of Hazzard (1979-1985)
