= André van den Heuvel =

Dutch actor (1927–2016)

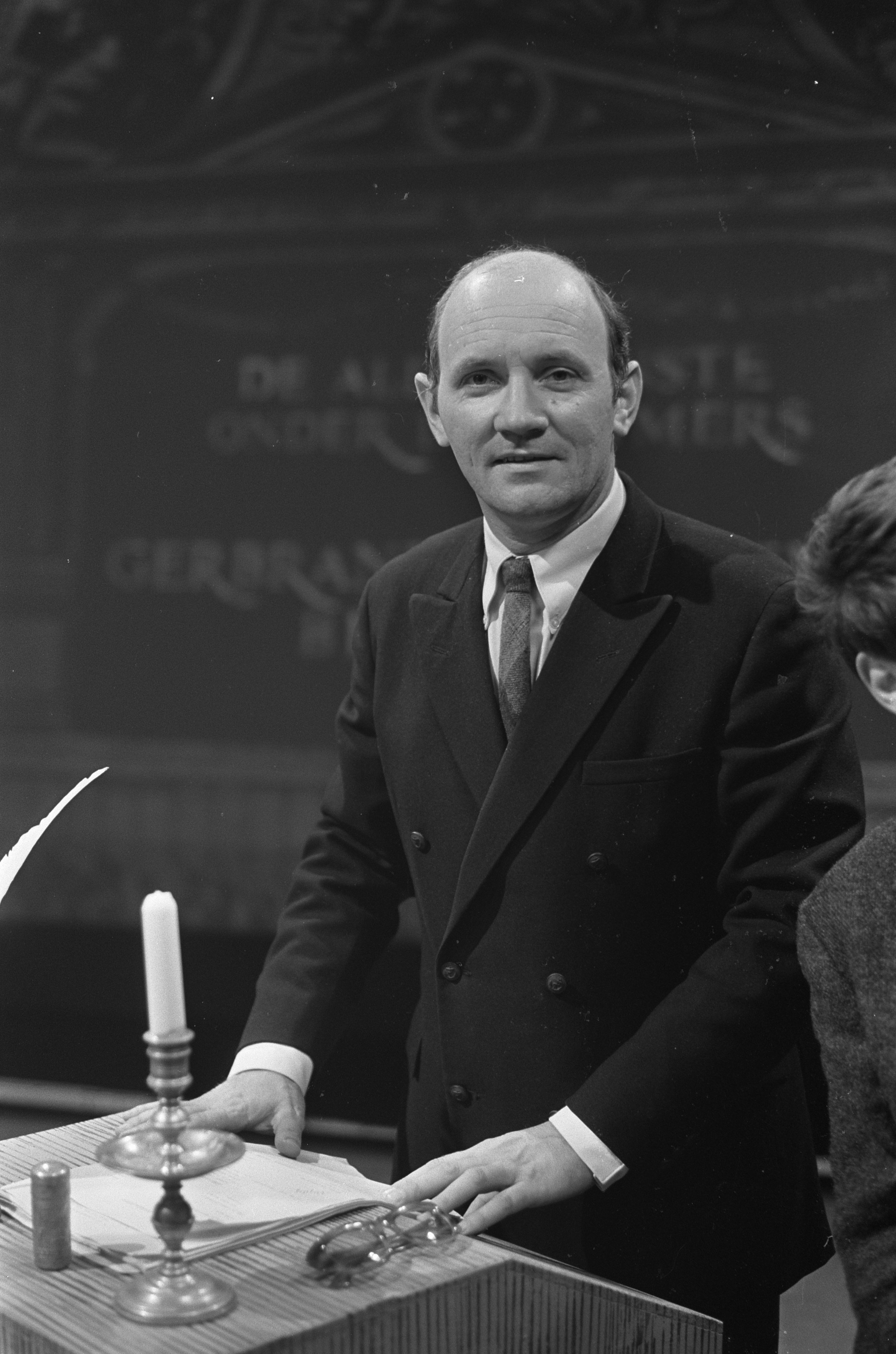
- André van den Heuvel in 1968
- Born: 4 June 1927; Tegelen, Netherlands
- Died: 9 February 2016 (aged 88); Amsterdam, Netherlands
- Occupation: Actor
- Years active: 1957–2008

André van den Heuvel (4 June 1927 – 9 February 2016) was a Dutch actor. He appeared in more than 55 films and television shows between 1957 and 2008.

== Filmography ==
Year	Title	Role	Notes
1958	Dorp aan de rivier		
1962	Kermis in de Regen	Willy van Os	
1962	The Silent Raid	Agent Teunisse	
1963	Like Two Drops of Water	Tonino	
1968	Amsterdam Affair	Professor Comerius	
1971	Mira		
1971	Business Is Business	Stamgast bij Leo	
1971	Daniel	Max van Kampen	
1972	Louisa, een woord van liefde	Pierre	
1972	Kapsalon		
1975	Lifespan	Felix Dolda	
1977	Rubens	Caravaggio	
1978	Dag Dokter!	Bernard Delfman	
1979	Mijn vriend	John Jensens	
1980	De bende van Hiernaast	vader van Marije	
1981	Ik ben Joep Meloen	Willie	
1981	All Things Pass	Ab	
1983	The Dragon That Wasn't (Or Was He?)	Bul Super	Voice
1989	Kunst en Vliegwerk	Buurman Veldhuis	
1999	De rode zwaan	Opa	
