= Wan Pipel =

- English-language poster
- Directed by: Pim de la Parra
- Written by: Rudi Kross; Lou Lichtveld
- Produced by: Wim Verstappen
- Starring: Borger Breeveld; Diana Gangaram Panday; Willeke van Ammelrooy
- Cinematography: Marc Felperlaan
- Edited by: Jutta Brandstaedter
- Music by: Hugo van Ams
- Distributed by: Scorpio Films
- Release date: 19 August 1976
- Running time: 111 minutes
- Country: Suriname
- Languages: Dutch; Sarnami Hindustani; Sranan Tongo

Wan Pipel (English: One People) is a 1976 Surinamese-Dutch drama film directed by Pim de la Parra. The screenplay was written by Rudi Kross and Lou Lichtveld. The leading roles are played by Borger Breeveld, Diana Gangaram Panday, and Willeke van Ammelrooy.

The film, produced by Wim Verstappen, was the first Surinamese film after independence. The budget was significantly exceeded, and projected visitor numbers fell far short of expectations. As a result, the dispute between 'Pim and Wim' was seen as the final blow for "Scorpio Films."

== Plot ==
Roy (Borger Breeveld) is an Afro-Surinamese man who studies in the Netherlands. He is recalled by telegram to Suriname because his mother is dying. His Dutch girlfriend Karina (Willeke van Ammelrooy) lends him money for a plane ticket. Back in his homeland, Roy quickly becomes obsessed with his own country and its culture. When he falls for an Indo-Surinamese Hindu nurse, Rubia (Diana Gangaram Panday), the conservative Hindu and Black communities are in revolt. Roy refuses to return to the Netherlands to finish his studies, even if Karina comes to bring him back. He insists that his duty lies in Suriname.

== Cast ==
- Borger Breeveld - Roy
- Diana Gangaram Panday - Rubia
- Willeke van Ammelrooy - Karina
- Emanuel van Gonter - Roy's father
- Ro Jackson-Breeveld - Roy's mother
- Sieuwpal Soekhlall - Rubia's father
- Bhagwandei Mokkumsingh - Rubia's mother
- Djardj Soekhlall - Rubia's brother
- Paragh Chotkan - Rubia's grandfather
- Etwarie Ramdin-Jhawnie - Rubia's grandmother
- Asha Bharosa - Rooshni
- Ruben Jitan - Rooshni's bridegroom
- Henk Gopali - Rubia's cousin
- J. Madho - Pandit
- Joyce Mungroo-Ooft - Henna
- Ruud Mungroo - Norman
- Grace Calor-Ooft - Carla
- Otto Sterman - Mr. Frenkel
