= Als in een Roes =

1986 film by Pim de la Parra

- Theatrical release poster
- Directed by: Pim de la Parra
- Cinematography: Frans Broment
- Release date: 1986
- Running time: 86 min, UK:145 min (extended cut)
- Country: Netherlands
- Language: Dutch

Als in een Roes is a 1986 Dutch film directed by Pim de la Parra.

== Plot ==
The story revolves around a theater group that is looking for a drama to play. The director is thinking to bring his private life on stage. He sees his wife to play the role of prostitute, and sends her to the whores to make the role more into its own again. Finally gets the couple arguing about the classifications, like the other amateurs, who needs to get to stick with their partners. The premiere seems to be in danger.

== Cast ==
- Herbert Flack: Nils Wine
- Liz Snoyink: Tessa Mahon
- Thom Hoffman: Diederik van Avezaat
- Devika Strooker: Esmée
- Leonoor Peacock: Sara Severijn
- Frances Sanders: Sweet
- Eva van Heijningen: Eva Adama
- Miguel Stigter Hero Winter
- Ellen Vogel: Agatha of Avezaat
- Nelly Frijda: Whore
- José Lea: Pianist
- Guikje Roethof: Girl on canal
- Judy Doorman: Fairy with pigeon
- Frans Weisz: Photographer
- Geert Essink: Toneelmeester
