= Andrea Domburg =

Dutch actress (1923–1997)

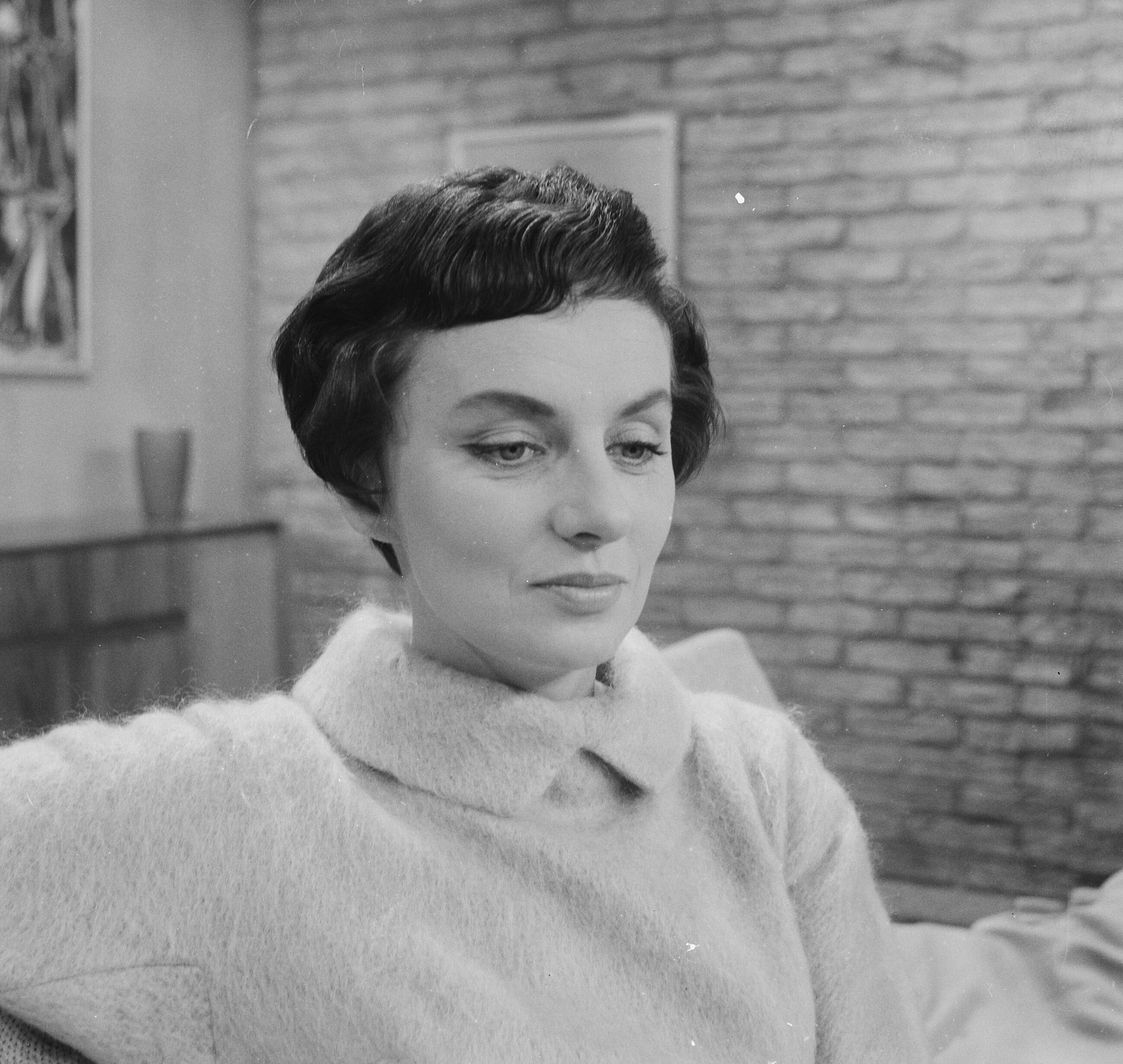
- Domburg in 1959
- Born: 21 April 1923; Amsterdam, Netherlands
- Died: 23 July 1997 (aged 74); Amsterdam, Netherlands
- Occupation: Actress
- Years active: 1957-1995 (film & TV)

Andrea Domburg (21 April 1923 – 23 July 1997) was a Dutch film, stage and television actress. She was awarded the Theo d'Or in 1968 for her stage work. Her screen appearances were mostly in Dutch film and television, although she appeared in the 1958 American thriller Spy in the Sky! which was shot partly in the Netherlands. She played Queen Wilhelmina in the 1977 film Soldier of Orange.

== Filmography ==
| Year | Title | Role | Notes |
|---|---|---|---|
| 1957 | Kleren Maken de Man | Voormalige vriendin Peter | |
| 1958 | Jenny | Greet | |
| 1958 | Spy in the Sky! | Alexandrine Duvivier | |
| 1958 | Fanfare | Lies | |
| 1962 | Kermis in de Regen | Annie Holst | |
| 1963 | Like Two Drops of Water | Marianne | Narrator, Uncredited |
| 1969 | De blanke slavin | Loudy, rijke Nederlandse vrouw | |
| 1975 | Keetje Tippel | Keetje's moeder | |
| 1975 | Mens erger je niet | | |
| 1977 | Soldier of Orange | Queen Wilhelmina | |
| 1979 | Kort Amerikaans | Moeder van Erik | |
| 1981 | All Things Pass | Dorien | TV movie |
| 1984 | De stille Oceaan | Emilia Winters | |
| 1986 | The van Paemel Family | Barones de Wilde | |
| 1989 | Wilde Harten | Dora | |

== Bibliography ==
- Bas Agterberg, George Sluizer & Daniel Biltereyst. The Cinema of the Low Countries. Wallflower Press, 2004.
