= Allemaal naar Bed =

1970 film

- Directed by: Dick Visser
- Release date: 1970
- Running time: 102 minutes
- Country: Netherlands
- Language: Dutch

Allemaal naar Bed is a 1970 Dutch film directed by Dick Visser.

The movie was intended to be erotic: a group of women are filmed while doing auditions for a porn move. The women are of various backgrounds; one writes children's books. The director guides them through a collective striptease and gets them ready for a bedroom scene. Supposedly it is based on actual auditions for a Dutch sex comedy. It was advertised as a sex comedy but, according to Eye Film, it is really an uninteresting type of documentary film investigating how and whether people are prepared to act out sex scenes in front of the camera. Much of the film is conversational, about prejudices, politics, personal problems. Fred van Doorn, writing for Het Parool, called it "the most cheerless a-sexual nudity in the history of film". Its producer, Cor Koppies, called it the worst movie ever made. VPRO Cinema gave it one star out of five.

== Cast ==
- Nathalie Boyer
- Pamela Rothschild
- Jane Carr
- Rinie Slings
