= Mira (1971 film) =

1971 film

- Theatrical release poster
- Directed by: Fons Rademakers
- Written by: Hugo Claus; Magda Reypens; Stijn Streuvels
- Produced by: Jan van Raemdonck; Gérard Vercruysse
- Starring: Willeke van Ammelrooy
- Cinematography: Eduard van der Enden
- Edited by: Jan Dop
- Music by: Hans Dekens
- Release date: 4 March 1971
- Running time: 95 minutes
- Countries: Netherlands; Belgium
- Language: Dutch
- Box office: $1.3 million (Netherlands and Belgium)

Mira is a 1971 Dutch-Belgian drama film directed by Fons Rademakers, based on the novel De Teleurgang van den Waterhoek by Stijn Streuvels. It was entered into the 1971 Cannes Film Festival. The film was selected as the Dutch entry for the Best Foreign Language Film at the 44th Academy Awards, but was not accepted as a nominee. The film was one of the highest-grossing Dutch films of 1971 with a gross of $1.3 million from Belgium and the Netherlands.

== Cast ==
- Willeke van Ammelrooy as Mira
- Jan Decleir as Lander
- Carlos van Lanckere as deken Broeke
- Luc Ponette as Maurice Rondeau
- Roger Bolders as Sieper
- Mart Gevers as Manse
- Freek de Jonge as Treute
- Charles Janssens as Snoek
- Josephine van Gasteren as Moeder van Maurice
- Fons Rademakers as Notaris
- Romain DeConinck as Landmeter
- Ann Petersen as Hospita
- Ward de Ravet as Rijkswachter
- Jo Gevers
- Bert André (as Marc André)
- André van den Heuvel

== See also ==
- List of submissions to the 44th Academy Awards for Best Foreign Language Film
- List of Dutch submissions for the Academy Award for Best Foreign Language Film
