= Frederik de Groot =

Dutch actor (born 1946)

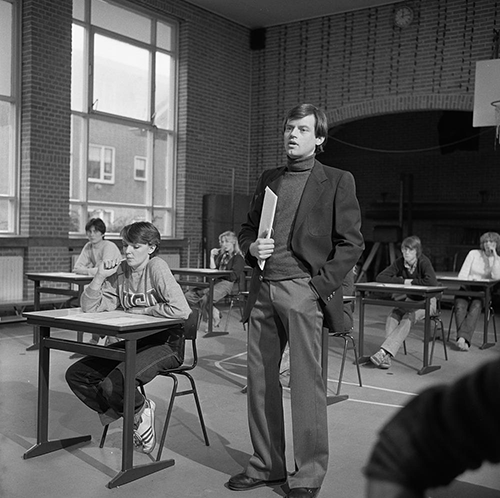
- Frederik de Groot in 1980
- Born: 23 May 1946 (age 78); Bilthoven, Netherlands
- Years active: 1973–present

Frederik Percy de Groot (born 23 May 1946) is a Dutch actor.

== Career ==
In the Netherlands he appeared in the detective series Bureau Kruislaan and its spin-off Unit 13.

He is known in Canada where he was the television spokesman for ING Direct for many years. The marketing campaign was developed by GWP Brand Engineering. They picked an actor with a foreign accent so that customers would not be surprised to learn the bank was also foreign. De Groot also speaks French, and is unusual among Canadian spokespeople for also appearing in the company's French Canadian language spots.

== Personal life ==
He has been married since 1997 to Marja Bakker, with whom he has three children. He had a relationship with actress Fiona Gaunt, with whom he had a daughter, Genevieve Gaunt, who is also an actress, and portrayed Pansy Parkinson in Harry Potter and the Prisoner of Azkaban.

Frederik and his wife Marja own theatre company Living Productions – Hoorn.

== Filmography ==
- Pastorale 1943 (1978)
- The Little Riders (1996) .... Father Hugo
- Sinterklaas en het uur van de waarheid (2006) .... Inspecteur Jankers
- Sinterklaas en het geheim van het grote boek (2008) .... Inspecteur Jankers
- Verloren Jaren (2010) .... Studieleider regie
- Bernhard, schavuit van Oranje (2010) .... Willem Drees
