= Lex Goudsmit =

Dutch actor (1913–1999)

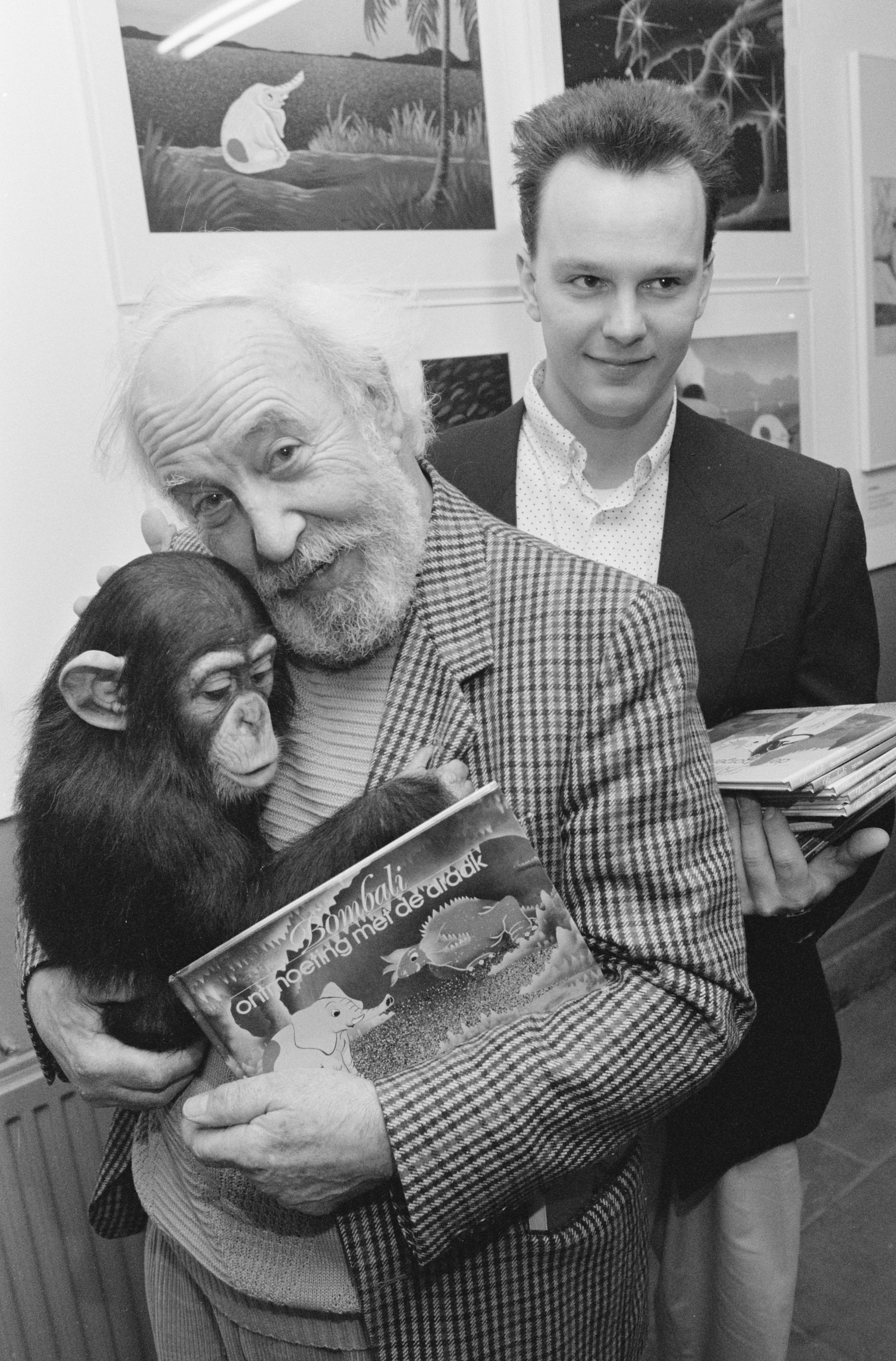
- Lex Goudsmit presents his children book Bombali illustrated by his son Rick (1989)
- Born: Alexandre Joseph Goudsmit; 15 March 1913; Brussels, Belgium
- Died: 10 December 1999 (aged 86); Amsterdam, Netherlands
- Occupation: Actor

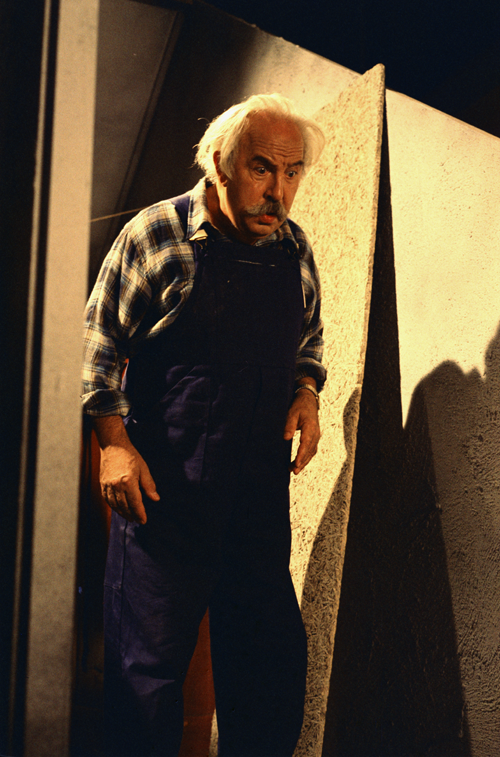
Lex Goudsmit in Citroentje met suiker (1973)

Alexandre Joseph "Lex" Goudsmit (Dutch: [ˈlɛks ˈxʌutsmɪt]; (Note: Goudsmit in isolation: [ˈɣʌutsmɪt].) 15 March 1913 – 10 December 1999) was a Dutch-Belgian actor.

Goudsmit's father, a diamond worker, was Jewish and his mother Roman Catholic. He became famous in 1966 for playing Tevye in Fiddler on the Roof, which role he performed some 1100 times in the Netherlands and in London. He played many characters on Dutch television, among others in the popular youth series Q en Q (1974) and Thomas en Senior (1985–88). From 1984 to 1999 he played Grandpa Lex on Sesamstraat, the Dutch version of Sesame Street. Goudsmit was one of the artists who recorded the song Shalom from Holland (written by Simon Hammelburg and Ron Klipstein) as a token of solidarity to the Israeli people, threatened by missiles from Iraq, during the first Gulf War in 1991.

When Goudsmit died as the consequences of a stroke, instead of doing an episode dealing with his death, along the lines of Mr. Hooper's death, the producers addressed the issue on the program following Sesamstraat, called Jeugdjournaal (Youth News). The program aired a compilation of his best appearances on the show and commented on his death. Goudsmit had told producers that he wanted to stay on Sesamstraat even after his death, so the latest scenes he taped were still used on the next season. During this season, he was slowly phased out of the show and Aart Staartjes, who played the grumpy neighbor "Meneer Aart", became the grandfather figure.
