= Donald Jones (actor) =

American-born Dutch actor (1932–2004)

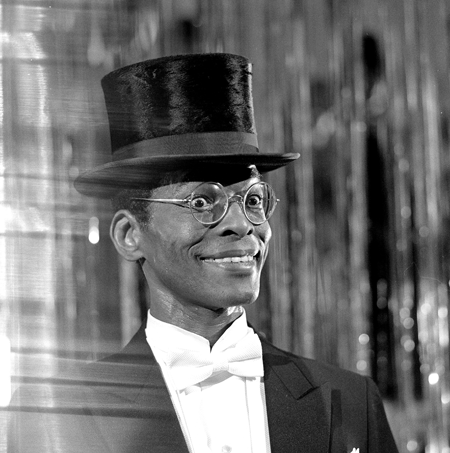
- Jones in 1963
- Born: Donald Towe Jones; January 24, 1932; Harlem, New York City
- Died: November 5, 2004 (aged 72); Amsterdam, Netherlands
- Occupations: Actor; dancer; singer
- Years active: 1954–2004
- Spouse: Adèle Bloemendaal (m. 1963)
- Children: John Jones

Donald Towe Jones (January 24, 1932 – November 5, 2004) was an American-Dutch actor, singer and dancer; born in Harlem, he went to the Netherlands in his early twenties and became one of the first Dutch black stars.

== Biography ==
Born in Harlem, New York Jones originally trained to be an advertising designer. He moved to the Netherlands in 1954 with a dance troupe. He was hired by a cabaret company and began a career singing, acting, and dancing. He was hired for the very first Dutch television show, the 1950s television hit Pension Hommeles (written by Annie M.G. Schmidt), in which he played Dinky Henderson, who sings the Cor Lemaire song "Ik zou je het liefste in een doosje willen doen," a Dutch hit and now one of the standards in the musical comedy genre. This made Jones the first black star in the Netherlands.

Jones played in many Dutch shows, movies (Grijpstra & De Gier, 1979), and theatrical productions, and in television shows such as Mik & Mak and Pipo de Clown. Jones was one of the artists who recorded the song Shalom from Holland (written by Simon Hammelburg and Ron Klipstein) as a token of solidarity to the Israeli people, threatened by missiles from Iraq, during the first Gulf War in 1991.

=== Personal life ===
He married Dutch actress Adèle Bloemendaal; they were the first well-known mixed couple in the country. Their son, John Jones (born 1963), went on to become an actor and comedian.

== Death ==
Donald Jones died in Amsterdam of a heart attack on November 5, 2004, at the age of 72. He was cremated and the ashes were placed at the Westgaarde Cemetery.
