= Hein Boele =

Dutch voice actor (1939–2025)

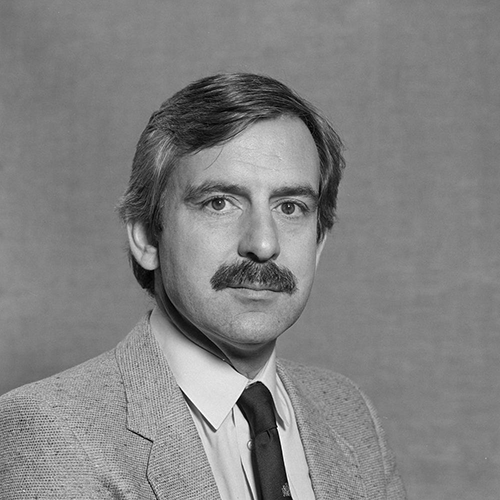
- Boele in 1981
- Born: Hendrik Evert Wigand Boele; 24 November 1939; Zwolle, Netherlands
- Died: 28 July 2025 (aged 85); Almere, Netherlands
- Occupation: Voice actor
- Years active: 1966–2025

Hendrik Evert "Hein" Wigand Boele (24 November 1939 – 28 July 2025) was a Dutch voice actor.

== Life and career ==
Boele is best known for dubbing the voice of Elmo on Sesamstraat, the Dutch co-production of Sesame Street. Boele also dubbed Gobo Fraggle's voice for Fraggle Rock.

== Death ==
Boele died after a short illness in Almere, on 28 July 2025, at the age of 85.

== Selected filmography ==
- Pastorale 1943 (1978)
