= De Mantel der Liefde =

1978 film

- Directed by: Adriaan Ditvoorst
- Written by: Adriaan Ditvoorst; Pieter Goedings
- Produced by: Luc Bijkerk; Pieter Goedings
- Starring: Willeke van Ammelrooy; Tim Beekman; Marjan Berk
- Cinematography: Mat van Hensbergen
- Edited by: August Verschueren
- Music by: Vangelis (from the album Heaven and Hell)
- Distributed by: Luton Films
- Release date: 1978
- Running time: 110 minutes
- Country: Netherlands
- Language: Dutch
- Budget: ƒ 450,000

De Mantel der Liefde is a 1978 Dutch satirical anthology film, directed by Adriaan Ditvoorst. It is a black comedy based on the Ten Commandments and mankind's failure to live up to them.

== Plot ==
The film starts off with Jesus Christ and Moses, who are sent from Antiquity to the present to see if mankind followed up the Ten Commandments? The film is divided in ten self-contained sketches, named after one of the Commandments each. Every sketch shows people sinning against the Commandments. Near the end the director and his producer (Hans Boskamp) watch their own film reach its conclusion. The producer feels the movie "sucks" and is "too vulgar", whereupon the director defends it by saying it's actually "art". The producer then replies that "art doesn't sell" and "stupid entertainment is what the public wants."

== Cast ==
- Willeke van Ammelrooy: Maria
- Tim Beekman: Bakker
- Marjan Berk: Annie
- Ronnie Bierman: Gerda
- Anne Wil Blankers: Anne
- Hans Boskamp: Moses / producer
- Bertus Botterman: Vader
- Adrian Brine: Abortionist
- Hans Cornelissen: Jongen
- Hans Croiset: Minister
- Jules Croiset: Pastor
- Rijk de Gooyer: Cor
- Wim van der Grijn: Cyclist
- Liëla Koguchi: Ms. Split
- Mimi Kok: Baker's wife
- Joost Prinsen: Jesus / director
