= Grijpstra & De Gier =

- Directed by: Wim Verstappen
- Written by: Wim Verstappen; Janwillem van de Wetering
- Produced by: Rob Houwer
- Cinematography: Marc Felperlaan
- Edited by: Jutta Brandstaedter
- Music by: Rogier van Otterloo
- Distributed by: Tuschinski Film Distribution
- Release date: 1979
- Running time: 86 minutes
- Country: Netherlands
- Language: Dutch

Grijpstra & De Gier is a 1979 Dutch crime film directed by Wim Verstappen. It is based on the eponymous novel series by Jan Willem van de Wetering (although his name is usually styled Janwillem van de Wetering), specifically Het lijk in de Haarlemmer Houttuinen (translation: The Body in the Haarlemmer Houttuinen, a former neighbourhood in Amsterdam).

The film has also been released as Fatal Error and Outsider in Amsterdam. Although the film was not received to critical acclaim, it managed reasonable box-office success.

== Cast ==
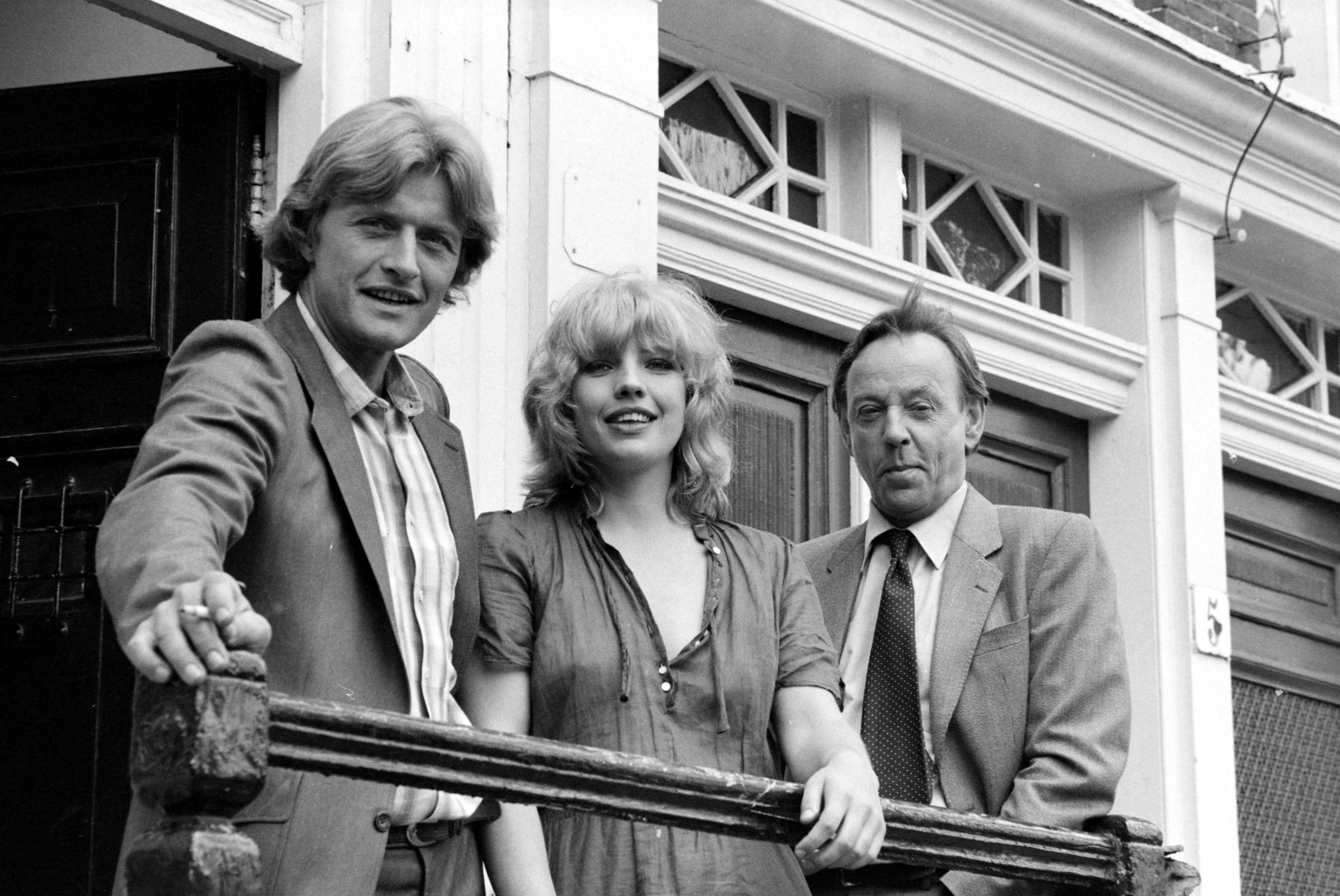
Cast Grijpstra en de Gier in Amsterdam, 1979

- Rijk de Gooyer as Henk Grijpstra
- Rutger Hauer as Rinus de Gier
- Willeke van Ammelrooy as Constanze Verboom
- Donald Jones as Habberdoedas Van Meteren
- Marina de Graaf as Helen
- Frederik de Groot as Simon Cardozo
- Jan Retèl as Commissaris
- Hans Croiset as De Kater
- Marjan Berk as Mevrouw Grijpstra
- Hilly Ruardy as Treesje
- Jaap Stobbe as Beuzekom
- Tom van Beek as Hoofdinspecteur
- Olaf Wijnants as Ringetje
- Joekie Broedelet as Miesje Verboom
- Eyk Backer

== Synopsis ==
Grijpstra is a man who easily gets frustrated and acts out his anger by hitting people. De Gier is a womanizer. Chief suspect in this case is a former police officer. The case is originally about a man who seems to have hanged himself but which turns out to be a murder involving the drug trade.

== Sequel ==
A sequel was made: De Ratelrat, in which Rutger Hauer was replaced by Peter Faber.

== Spin-Off ==
The novels were also made into a spin-off television series which ran from 2004 to 2007, with Jack Wouterse as Grijpstra and Roef Ragas as de Gier.
