= Dag Dokter! =

1978 film

- Directed by: Ate de Jong
- Produced by: Fons Rademakers
- Distributed by: Tuschinski Film Distribution
- Release date: 1978
- Running time: 94 minutes
- Country: Netherlands
- Language: Dutch

Dag Dokter! is a 1978 Dutch drama film directed by Ate de Jong.

== Cast ==
- Matthijs van Heijningen ... Fat man
- Kitty Janssen ... Elizabeth Delfman
- Derek de Lint ... Theo van Delft
- Dick Swidde ... Mr. Koppers
- André van den Heuvel ... Bernard Delfman
- Huub van der Lubbe ... Maxim
- Monique van de Ven ... Ingrid Sanders
- Bill Ward ... Jimmy Sanders
- Astrid Wijn ... Marjan van Dijk
