= Fons Rademakers =

Dutch actor (1920–2007)

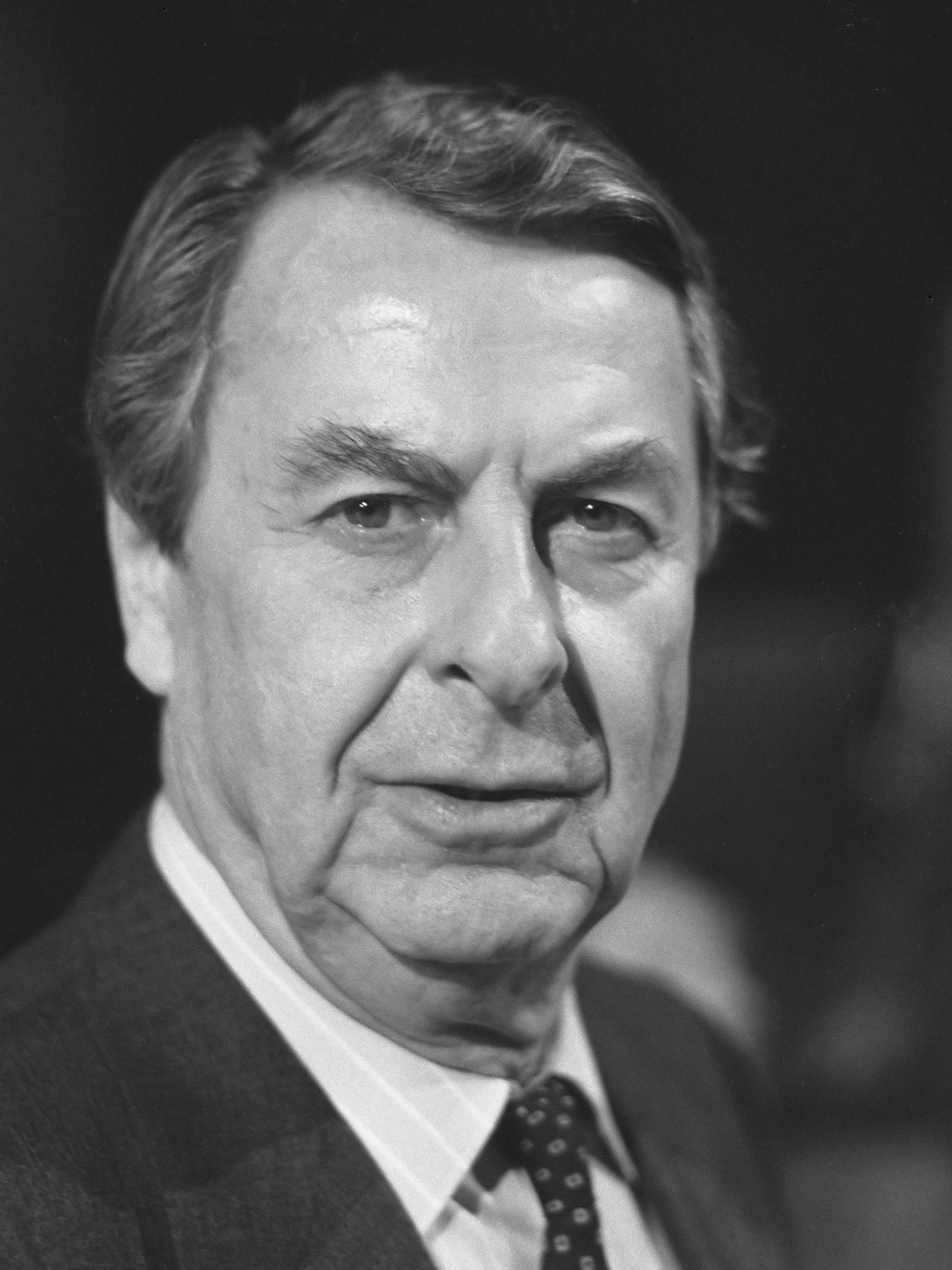
- Fons Rademakers in 1986
- Born: Alphonse Marie Rademakers; 5 September 1920; Roosendaal, Netherlands
- Died: 22 February 2007 (aged 86); Geneva, Switzerland
- Occupations: Actor; Film director Film producer Screenwriter
- Years active: 1950–2007
- Notable work: The Village on the River; The Assault
- Spouses: Josephine van Gasteren (m. 1942; div. 1945) Ellen Vogel (m. 1953; div. 1957) Lili Rademakers (m. 1960)
- Children: 2
- Awards: Academy Award for Best Foreign Language Film (1986); Golden Globe Award for Best Foreign Language Film (1986)

Alphonse Marie "Fons" Rademakers (5 September 1920 – 22 February 2007) was a Dutch actor, film director, film producer and screenwriter.

== Career ==
His 1960 film Makkers Staakt uw Wild Geraas was entered into the 11th Berlin International Film Festival, where it won the Silver Bear Award.

During a career spanning several decades he directed 11 films, including The Assault, which won the Academy Award for Best Foreign Language Film in 1986, and The Village on the River, nominated for the same award in 1959. Making him both the first Dutch director to be nominated and win this award.

He granted a wide-ranging interview to Radio Netherlands in 1987.

He died in 2007 in a Geneva hospital of emphysema, after the life-support machines were switched off at his request.

== Filmography ==
- The Village on the River (Dorp aan de rivier) (1958)
- Makkers Staakt uw Wild Geraas (1960)
- The Knife (Het Mes) (1961)
- Like Two Drops of Water (Als twee druppels water) (1963)
- The Dance of the Heron (De dans van de reiger) (1966)
- Daughters of Darkness (1970)
- Mira (1971)
- Because of the Cats (1973)
- Max Havelaar (Max Havelaar of de koffieveilingen der Nederlandsche handelsmaatschappij) (1976)
- Lifespan (1976)
- The Judge's Friend (Mijn vriend) (1979)
- Vrijdag (1981)
- The Assault (1986)
- The Rose Garden (1989)
