= Pastorale 1943 =

1978 film

- Theatrical release poster
- Directed by: Wim Verstappen
- Written by: Wim Verstappen
- Based on: Pastorale 1943 by Simon Vestdijk
- Produced by: Frans Rasker
- Starring: Frederik de Groot; Renée Soutendijk; Hein Boele; Bernard Droog; Geert de Jong; Leen Jongewaard; Pieter Lutz; Sacco van der Made; Coen Flink; Sylvia Kristel; Rutger Hauer
- Cinematography: Marc Felperlaan
- Music by: Robert Heppener
- Distributed by: Concorde Film
- Release date: 20 April 1978
- Running time: 125 minutes
- Country: Netherlands
- Language: Dutch

Pastorale 1943 is a 1978 Dutch drama film directed by Wim Verstappen and starring Frederik de Groot. The film was selected as the Dutch entry for the Best Foreign Language Film at the 51st Academy Awards, but was not accepted as a nominee.

== Cast ==
- Frederik de Groot as Johan Schults
- Leen Jongewaard as Eskens
- Coen Flink as Hammer
- Sacco van der Made as Ballegooyen
- Hein Boele as Cohen
- Geert de Jong as Mies Evertse
- Liane Saalborn as Juffrouw Schölvink
- Bram van der Vlugt as Van Dale
- Bernard Droog as Poerstamper
- Femke Boersma as Moeder Poerstamper
- Dick van den Toorn as Piet Poerstamper
- Peter Römer as Kees Poerstamper
- Rutger Hauer as August Schultz

== See also ==
- List of submissions to the 51st Academy Awards for Best Foreign Language Film
- List of Dutch submissions for the Academy Award for Best Foreign Language Film
