= Het Jaar van de Kreeft =

- Directed by: Herbert Curiel
- Written by: Hugo Claus
- Cinematography: Frans Bromet
- Music by: Marian de Garriga
- Release date: 18 September 1975 (Netherlands)
- Running time: 91 minutes
- Country: Netherlands
- Language: Dutch

Het Jaar van de Kreeft (The Year of the Cancer) is a 1975 Dutch film directed by Herbert Curiel.

== Cast ==
- Willeke van Ammelrooy as Toni
- Rutger Hauer as Pierre
- Piet Romer as Daan
- Sascha Hoffs as Muisje
- Bart Hammink as Karel
- Jennifer Willems as Pietje

== Story ==
A movie about a short but intense relationship between a man (Rutger Hauer) and a woman (Willeke van Ammelrooy). The two are very different. She doesn't want to give up her independence. Also titled "Cancer Rising".
