= Netherlands Film Academy =

Coordinates: 52°22′06″N 4°54′17″E

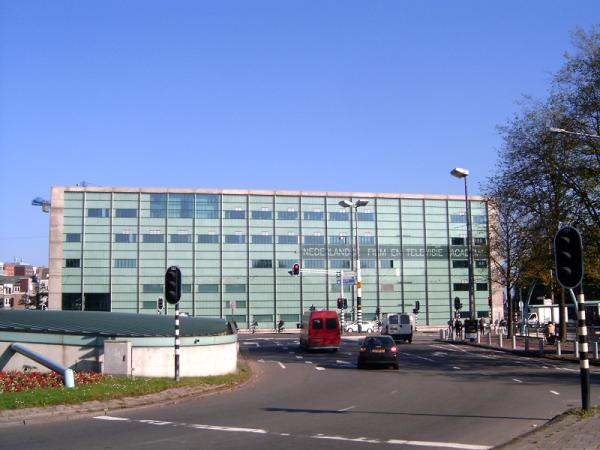
- Netherlands Film Academy
- Type: Film school
- Established: 1958
- Affiliations: Amsterdam University of the Arts
- Location: Netherlands
- Campus: Urban
- Website: filmacademie.nl

The Netherlands Film Academy (Dutch: Nederlandse Filmacademie) (NFA) was founded in 1958.

The academy is the only recognised institute in the Netherlands that offers training to prepare for the work in the various crew disciplines. Specialisation is possible in fiction directing, documentary directing, screenwriting, editing, producing, sounddesign, cinematography, production design, and interactive multimedia/visual effects.

The Netherlands Film Academy is situated at Markenplein 1 in Amsterdam. It is a division of the Amsterdam University of the Arts.

== Alumni ==
- Jan de Bont, cinematographer of Die Hard and director of Twister and Speed
- Stephan Brenninkmeijer, director and film producer
- Pieter Jan Brugge, producer of Heat and Defiance
- Danniel Danniel, director and editor of Ei 1987.
- Mike van Diem, director of Character
- Gied Jaspars, television and radio director
- Frank Ketelaar, screenwriter, film and television director
- Martin Koolhoven, director
- Nanouk Leopold, director
- Dick Maas, director
- Pim de la Parra, director
- Diederik van Rooijen, director
- Theo van de Sande, cinematographer of Blade and Grown Ups
- Carel Struycken, actor in The Addams Family and Twin Peaks
- Paul Verhoeven, director of Total Recall and Basic Instinct
- Leon de Winter, writer and film producer
- Winston Julian van Graafeiland, CGI artist and YouTuber
