= Pim de la Parra =

Surinamese-Dutch film director (1940–2024)

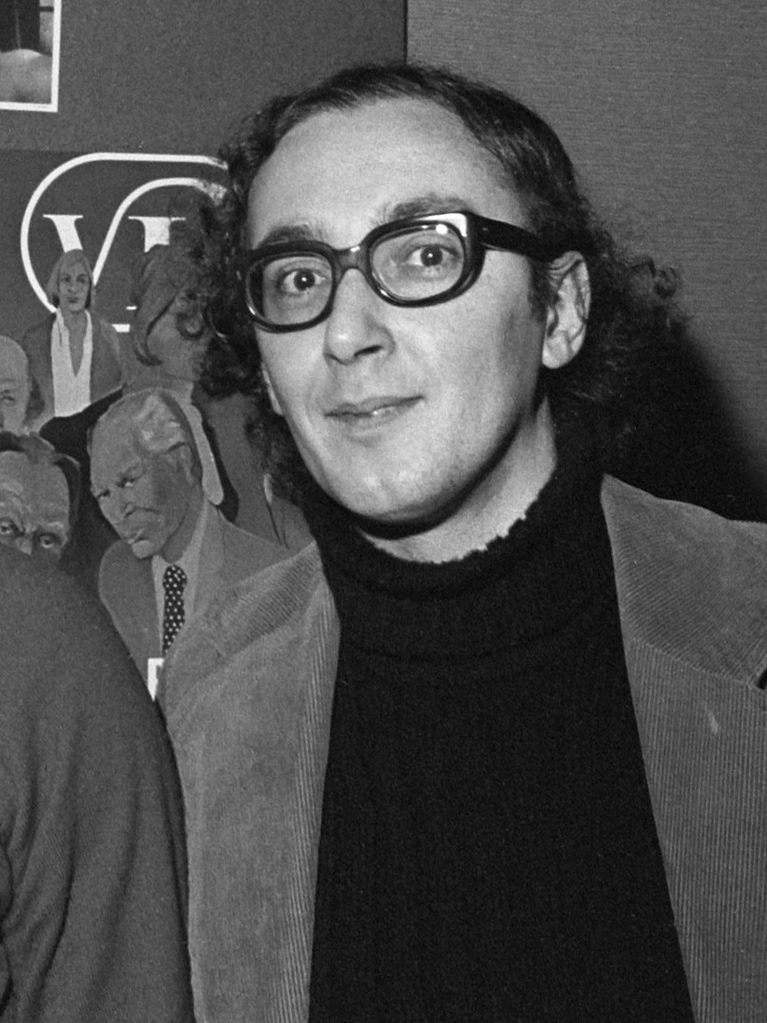
- De la Parra in 1972
- Born: 5 January 1940; Paramaribo, Suriname
- Died: 6 September 2024 (aged 84); Paramaribo, Suriname
- Occupation: Film director
- Years active: 1965–2010

Pim de la Parra (5 January 1940 – 6 September 2024) was a Surinamese-Dutch film director.

== Biography ==
De la Parra was born in Paramaribo and is partly of Portuguese-Jewish descent. He was educated at the Netherlands Film Academy. He became an editorial board member of the film magazine Skoop from 1963 which had been established by other students of the Academy. Between 1967 and 1976, he directed films under the independent production company Scorpio Films with Dutch film director Wim Verstappen, who managed all of its achievements.

After a few short films, he began his career as an international director with Obsessions (1969), co-written by Martin Scorsese. He co-produced Blue Movie (1971) by Wim Verstappen, which was one of the most erotic movies of its time, showing nudity with a realism that confounded critics and censorship authorities. It was followed by Frank en Eva (1973), Alicia (1974), Dakota (1975) and Mijn Nachten met Susan, Olga, Albert, Julie, Piet & Sandra (1975), these four films forming an erotic tetralogy written with Charles Gormley. In 1976, he directed Wan Pipel, the first film shot entirely with actors from Suriname.

De la Parra had two daughters: the actress Bodil (born 1963) and the comedian Nina (born 1987). His son, Pimm Jal (born 1966) died in 2002.

De la Parra died in Paramaribo on 6 September 2024, at the age of 84.

== Select filmography ==
- Jongens, jongens wat een meid (1965)
- Joszef Katùs (1966)
- Obsessions a.k.a. Bezeten, Het Gat in de Muur (1969; scenario Pim de la Parra, Wim Verstappen and Martin Scorsese)
- Rubia's Jungle (1970)
- Blue Movie (1971)
- The Burglar (1972)
- Frank en Eva (1973)
- Mijn Nachten met Susan, Olga, Albert, Julie, Piet & Sandra (1975)
- Wan Pipel (1976)
- Paul Chevrolet en de ultieme hallucinatie (1985)
- Als in een Roes... (1986)
- Odyssée d'Amour (1987)
- Lost in Amsterdam (1989)
- De nacht van de wilde ezels (1990)
- Let the Music Dance (1990)
- Dagboek van een zwakke yogi (1993; as Ronald da Silva)
- Dream of a Shadow (1996)
- Ala di (2006)
- Het geheim van de Saramacca rivier (2007; first film of the Surinamese Film Academy)
