= Wim Verstappen =

Dutch film director (1937-2004)

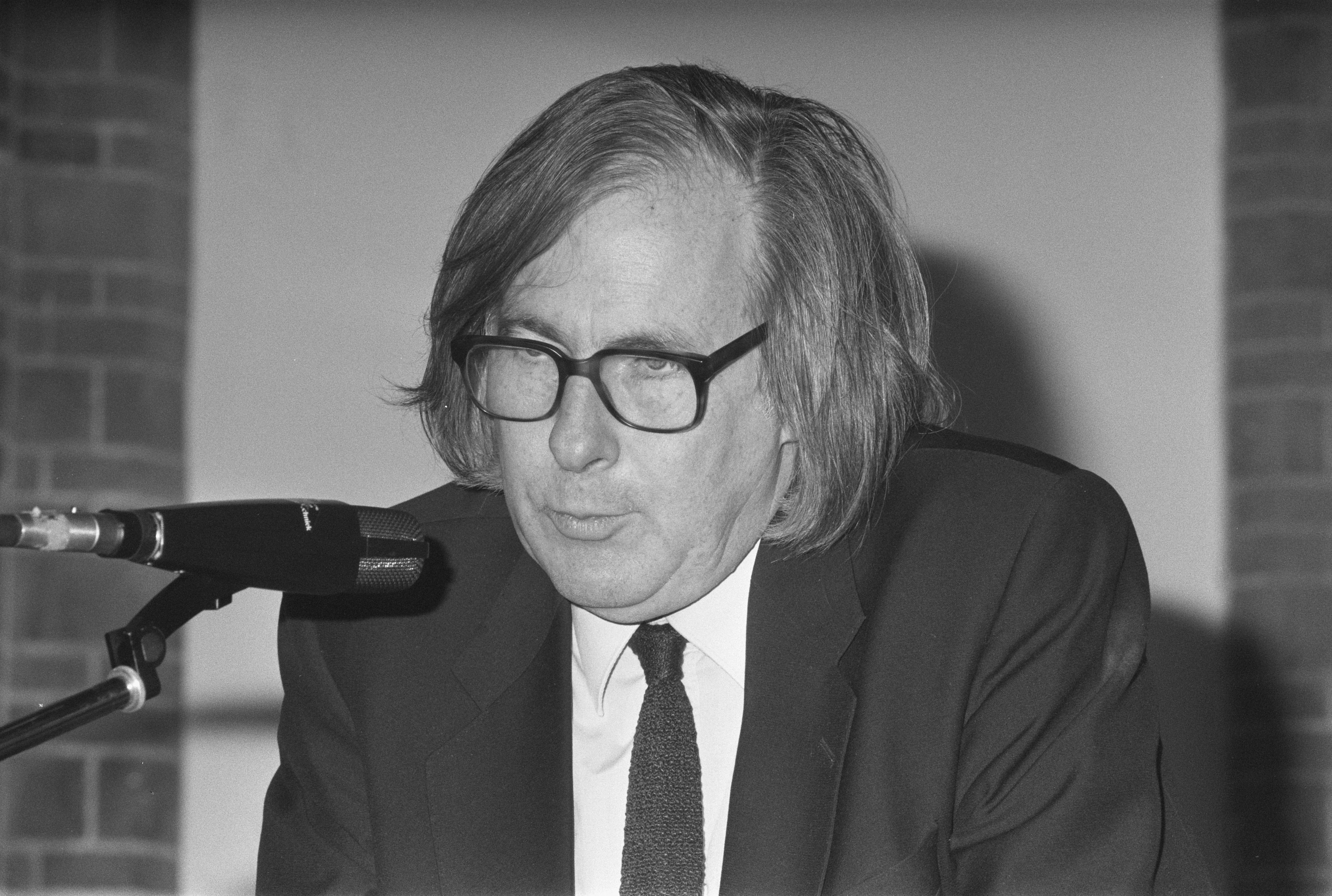
- Verstappen in 1987
- Born: 4 May 1937; Gemert, Netherlands
- Died: 24 July 2004 (aged 67); Amsterdam, Netherlands
- Occupations: Film director, screenwriter
- Years active: 1965–2004

Wim Verstappen (4 May 1937 – 24 July 2004) was a Dutch film director and producer, television director, and screenwriter.

Verstappen grew up in Curaçao. He began studies at the Netherlands Film and Television Academy in 1961, and released his first movie in 1966, De minder gelukkige terugkeer van Joszef Katus naar het land van Rembrandt. He joined the editorial staff of the film magazine Skoop in 1963, working alongside Nikolai van der Heyde, Gied Jaspars, and Pim de la Parra. From 1966 on he directed and produced films with De la Parra, and in 1967 they founded a production company, Scorpio Films, becoming known as 'Pim & Wim'. Among their productions was the 1971 explicit film Blue Movie, which led to the abolition of the Dutch film rating system for adults.

After the demise of Scorpio Films, Verstappen directed two films based on novels by Simon Vestdijk, Pastorale 1943 (1978) and Het verboden bacchanaal (1981). While the first was a commercial success, drawing an audience of over a million, the second film flopped, as did two later films, De Zwarte Ruiter (1983) and De Ratelrat (1987).

Verstappen stopped directing films and focused on film rights, founding an organization to secure authors' copyrights. In 1992 he was awarded the Dutch Filmmuseum Award for his contributions to the Dutch film industry, and in 1995 he received a Golden Calf for his body of work. He died of cancer in 2004, aged 67, in Amsterdam.

== Selected filmography ==
- IJdijk (1965; an experimental movie about pedophilia, with Verstappen playing the pedophile)
- De minder gelukkige terugkeer van Joszef Katus naar het land van Rembrandt (1966)
- Liefdesbekentenissen (1967; with Ramses Shaffy)
- Drop Out (1969)
- Blue Movie (1971; with Carry Tefsen and Hugo Metsers)
- VD (1972)
- Frank en Eva (1973)
- Alicia (1974)
- Dakota (1974)
- Leren van Las Vegas (1974; 8 mm documentary, commentary by Kees Brusse)
- Mens Erger Je Niet (1975; with Rijk de Gooyer)
- Pastorale 1943 (1978; based on the novel by Simon Vestdijk); adapted for television)
- Grijpstra & De Gier (1979; based on Het lijk in de Haarlemmerhouttuinen by Janwillem van de Wetering)
- Het verboden bacchanaal (1981; based on the novel by Simon Vestdijk)
- De Zwarte Ruiter (1983; adapted for television in 1986 as De Smokkelaar)
- Leren van Las Vegas (1985; re-edited version of the 1974 original)
- Grijpstra en de Gier 2: De Ratelrat (1987; based on the novel by Janwillem van de Wetering); adapted for television as Het Lijk In Friesland)
