= Lia Dorana =

Dutch comedian and actress

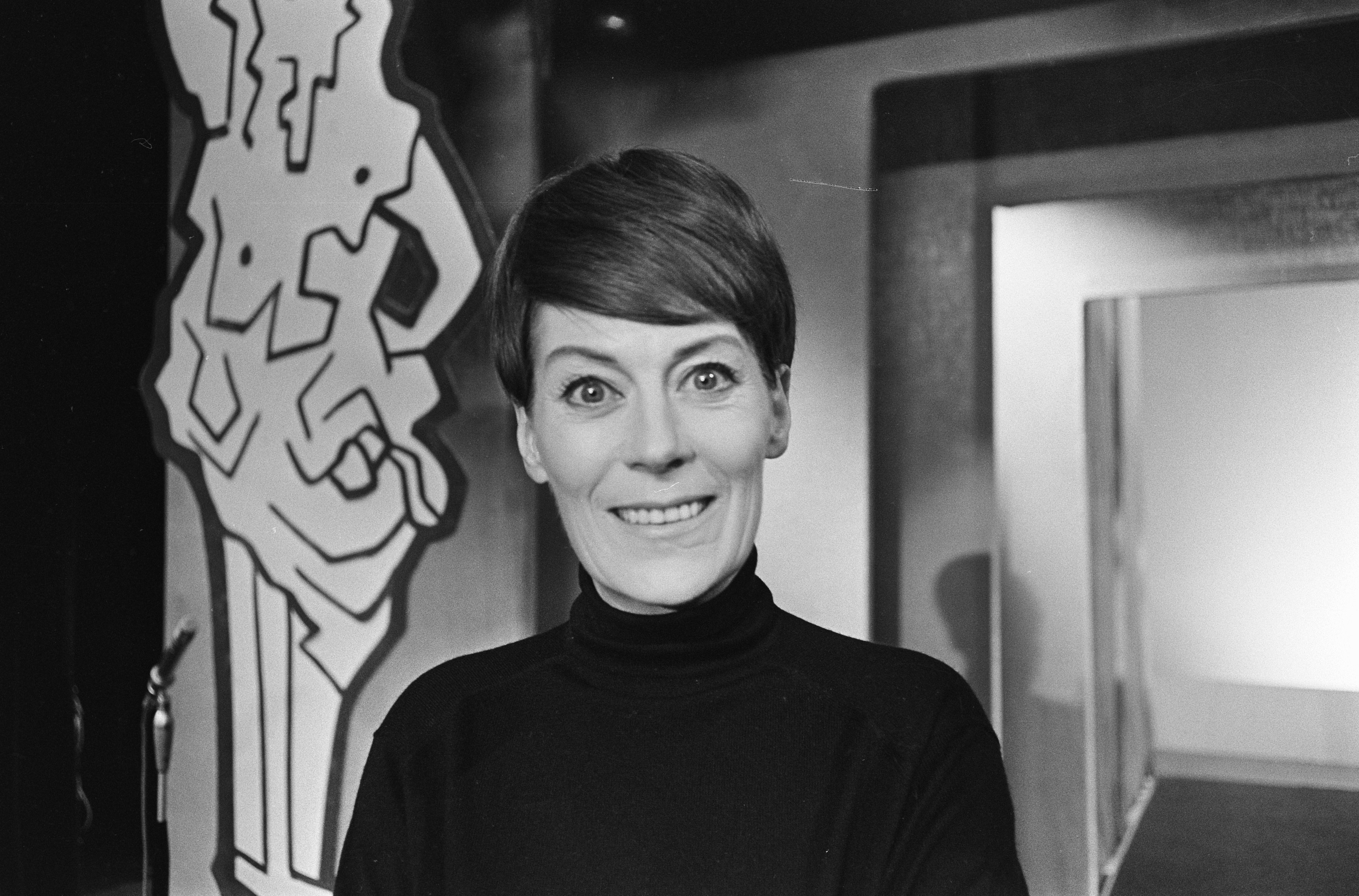
- Lia Dorana in 1966
- Born: Beppy van Werven; 18 July 1918; The Hague, Netherlands
- Died: 4 December 2010 (aged 92); Lage Vuursche, Netherlands

Lia Dorana (18 July 1918 – 4 December 2010) was a Dutch comedian and actress. Dorana was born Beppy van Werven in The Hague on 18 July 1918. She was discovered by Dutch singer and cabaret singer Wim Sonneveld, with whom she launched her early career. She also worked with Hetty Blok and Conny Stuart.

Lia Dorana died in her hometown of Lage Vuursche, in the Dutch province of Utrecht, on 4 December 2010, at the age of 92.
