= Wim Sonneveld =

Dutch cabaret artist and singer (1917–1974)

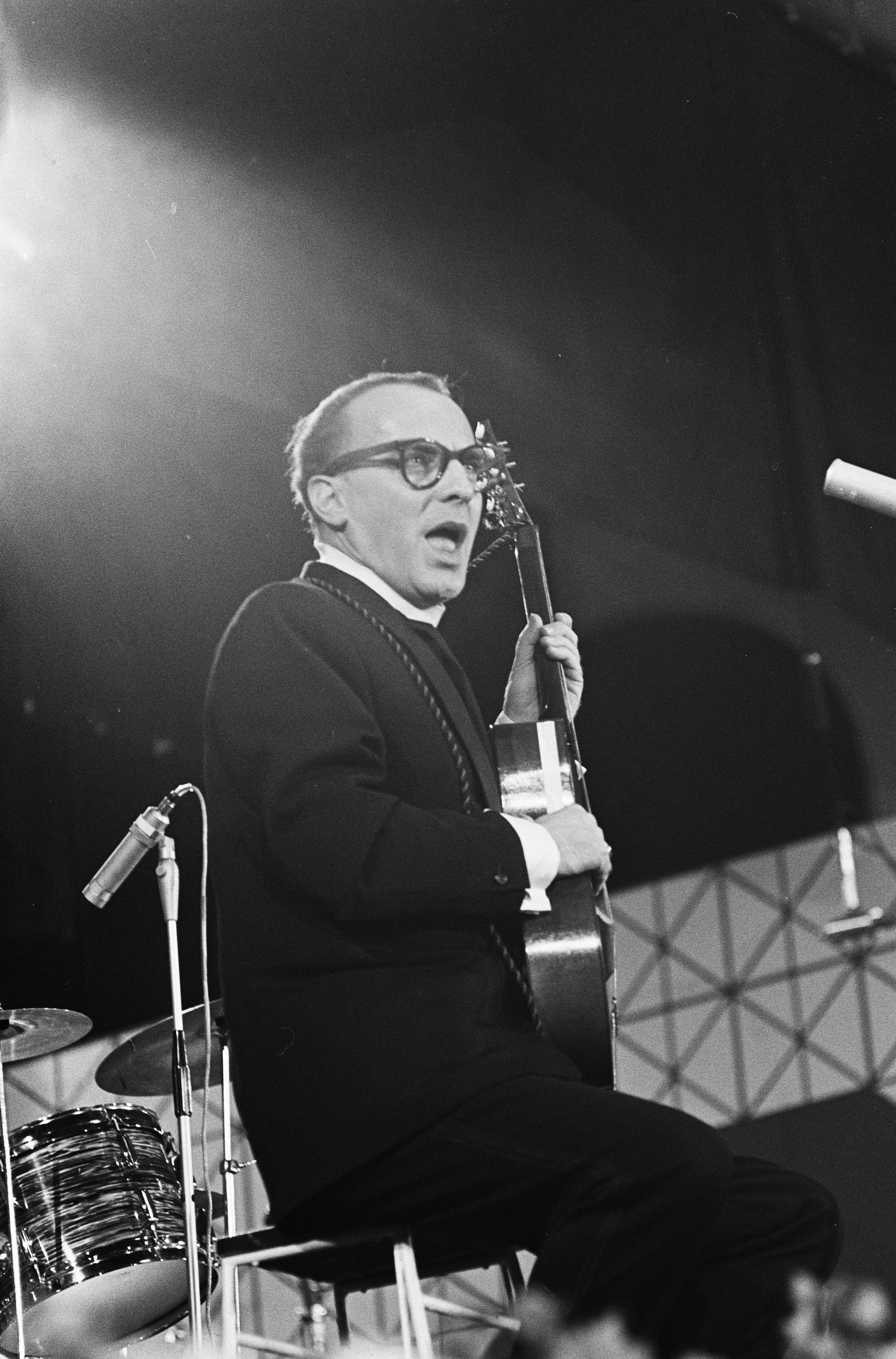
- Sonneveld as Friar Venantius in 1963
- Born: 28 June 1917; Utrecht, Netherlands
- Died: 8 March 1974 (aged 56); Amsterdam, Netherlands

Comedy career
- Years active: 1932–1974
- Medium: Stand-up, television, film

Willem "Wim" Sonneveld (Dutch pronunciation: [ˌʋɪləm ʋɪm ˈsɔnəvɛlt]; 28 June 1917 – 8 March 1974) was a Dutch cabaret artist and singer. Together with Toon Hermans and Wim Kan, he is considered to be one of the "Great Three" of Dutch cabaret. Sonneveld is generally viewed as a Dutch cultural icon for his work and legacy in theatre, musicals and music.

== Biography ==
Wim Sonneveld was born on 28 June 1917 in Utrecht, Netherlands, to Gerrit Sonneveld and Geertruida van den Berg. In 1922, at a very young age, he lost his mother. After his time at school, where he was the class clown, he had a few unsuccessful jobs.

In 1932, he started singing in an amateur choir, the Keep Smiling Singers, after which he teamed up with Fons Goossens in 1934 to form a duo and perform at anniversaries of associations and institutions. Later that year, he met reviewer Huub Janssen and after a journey through France in 1936 they started living together in Amsterdam, at first on the Westermarkt, later on the Prinsengracht. In that same year, he worked for Louis Davids. During the day he worked as an administrator and in evening he played small roles and sang chansons. In that same period, he performed with his partner Huub in his own club, De Rarekiek. In 1937, he sang in "cabarets" (floor shows in nightclubs) with Suzy Solidor and Agnes Capri in France.

After the declaration of war of 1940, Sonneveld returned to the Netherlands, where he acted in plays and in the revue of Loekie Bouwmeester. In 1940, he performed in the Theater der Prominenten and at Abraham van der Vies' De Sprookjesspelers. Here he met Conny Stuart. In 1943, he formed his own association, consisting among others of Conny Stuart, Lia Dorana, Albert Mol, Joop Doderer, Hetty Blok and Emmy Arbous.

Sonneveld was gay, though not openly, as it would have been unacceptable during that era.

== Death ==
On 20 February 1974, Sonneveld suffered a heart attack while driving on the highway from Amsterdam to Rotterdam. He had just picked up two hitchhikers and asked one of them to take the wheel. The hitchhiker did so, and drove at full speed back to the VU Hospital in Amsterdam.

Initially, Sonneveld began to recover, but on Friday 8 March, a second heart attack proved fatal.

He was buried on Monday 11 March at the Roman Catholic Cemetery Buitenveldert.

== Rim Ram ==
Between 1943 and 1959, he staged with his own cabaret association Rim Ram a great number of shows:

- 1943: Alleen voor dames (text by Hella Haasse)
- 1944: Sprookjes
- 1944: Opus drie
- 1945: De bloemetjes buiten
- 1945: Tingeltangel
- 1946: Verre reizen
- 1946: Tutti frutti
- 1946: Leidscheplein
- 1947: Vanavond om acht uur
- 1947: 't Is maar comedie
- 1948: 't Is historisch
- 1949: We spelen pantomime
- 1949: Iene-miene-mutten
- 1950: 't Is mij een raadsel
- 1951: Herhalingsoefeningen
- 1951: Artiestenpension
- 1952: Boekenfeest
- 1952: Gastenboek
- 1952: Het meisje met de grote voeten
- 1953: Bloemlezing (compilation show)
- 1953: In de winckel van Sinckel
- 1954: Waar de blanke top der duinen
- 1955: Huis tuin en keuken
- 1957: À la carte
- 1959: Rim Ram

== Willem Parel ==
A famous creation of Wim Sonneveld was Willem Parel, son and grandson of a Dutch street organ grinder as well as chairman of the En-pé-gé, the Dutch Pearl Association (Nederlands ParelGenootschap). This brought him great success on the VARA-radio in the early 1950s. Parel would expose movingly about "organ grinding in general and the psychology of the penny cup in particular". Over time Wim Sonneveld came to hate his creation, but he knew that Willem Parel drew a large audience and he couldn't live from just singing chansons. In 1955, a movie was shot called The Wondrous life of Willem Parel.

== Film, musical, solo ==
Wim Sonneveld has played in some movies: the aforementioned The Wondrous life of Willem Parel as well as the Hollywood thriller The Pink Hippopotamus (1956) and a later the films Silk stockings (1957) and Wasp End (1957).

After 702 performances of the musical My Fair Lady, since 1960, after his own club went bankrupt in 1959, with which he "wore out" three Eliza Doolittles (Margriet de Groot, Dorien Mijksenaar and Jasperina de Jong) in his role as dr. Higgins, he went solo with television shows such as Doe es wat, meneer Sonneveld (1962) and Blijf in Holland (1963). In 1964, he again took the stage with Een avond met Wim Sonneveld.

Remarkable was his threefold guest role in episode 16 of the television series Ja zuster, nee zuster by Annie M.G. Schmidt and Harry Bannink in 1967, as himself, Arie Pruijselaar junior and Arie Pruijselaar senior. In 1967 he performed alongside Ina van Faassen in a theater show and in 1971 with Willem Nijholt and Corrie van Gorp. His last film was Op de Hollandse toer (1973).

He would have liked to end his career singing French chansons, because his heart lay in France, where he had a house in Roquefort-les-Pins.

On 8 March 1974, Wim Sonneveld died at the age of 56 in the VU hospital in Amsterdam from his second heart attack.

Even though Wim Sonneveld never publicly stated that he was homosexual, he shared his life only with men, first with Hubert Janssen, later with prop designer, text writer and painter Friso Wiegersma (1925–2006) whom he met in 1947 and who created the character Nikkelen Nelis (Nickle Nelis) for him, a character, made from the well-known street singer from Rotterdam, named Koperen Ko (Copper Ko).

== Famous characters ==
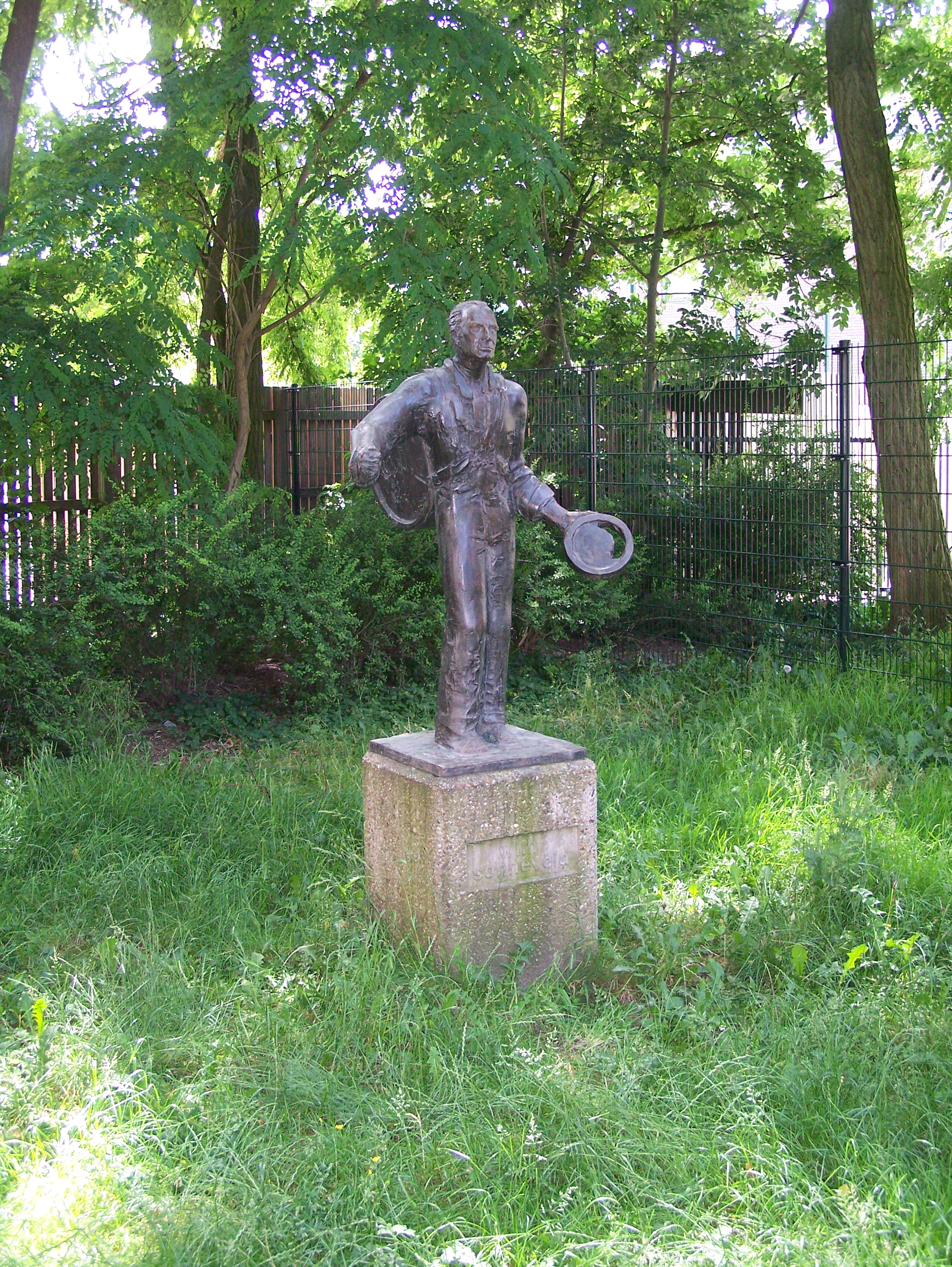
Statue of the fictional character "Nikkelen Nelis", a street singer character invented by Wim Sonneveld

- Willem Parel
- Nikkelen Nelis the street singer
- Friar Venantius
- The Stable Master

== Famous conferences ==
- Artificial insemination
- Hello, man behind the counter
- Croquettes
- Grandfather
- The Boys (about the father-problems with the love-life of his just-married 'daughter')

== Famous songs ==
- "Aan de Amsterdamse grachten2
- "Het dorp" (La montagne)
- "Katootje"
- "Margootje"
- "Tearoom Tango"
- "Zo heerlijk rustig"
- "Daar is de orgelman"
- "In een rijtuigie"
- "Doe het doek maar dicht"

== Discography ==
=== Albums noted in the Dutch Album Top 20/50/100 ===
Title	Release date	Entrance date	Highest position	Weeks	Comments
Wim Sonneveld, Willem Nijholt & Corrie van Gorp		16 October 1971	9	7	with Willem Nijholt and Corrie van Gorp
Muziek mozaïek, 10 maart 1974 (Recording of Duys' radio show)		30 March 1974	1	11	with Willem Duys
Complete discografie		5 October 1974	24	16	
De beste van Wim Sonneveld		9 November 1974	7	11	
Het beste van Wim Sonneveld		24 February 1979	24	21	
Een herinnering aan Wim Sonneveld		2 November 1985	50	13	
Haal het doek maar op		21 May 1994	39	5	
Voor altijd		10 April 1999	32	9	
Op de plaat – De complete reeks		31 October 2015	46		

=== Singles noted in the Dutch Top 40 ===
Title	Release date	Entrance date	Highest position	Weeks	Comments
Frater Venantius		16 January 1965	10	15	
Tearoom tango		26 March 1966	11	12	
De kat van Ome Willem		2 March 1968	2	10	
Mooi Amsterdam		23 March 1968	tip		with Willy Alberti
In een rijtuigje		23 March 1968	12	6	with Leen Jongewaard
Het dorp		18 May 1974	27	5	

== Wim Sonneveld Award ==
Every year since 1988, the Wim Sonneveld Award has been awarded to the most talented performer in cabaret and related arts on the Amsterdams kleinkunstfestival.
