= Velsen =

Municipality in North Holland, Netherlands

- Municipality
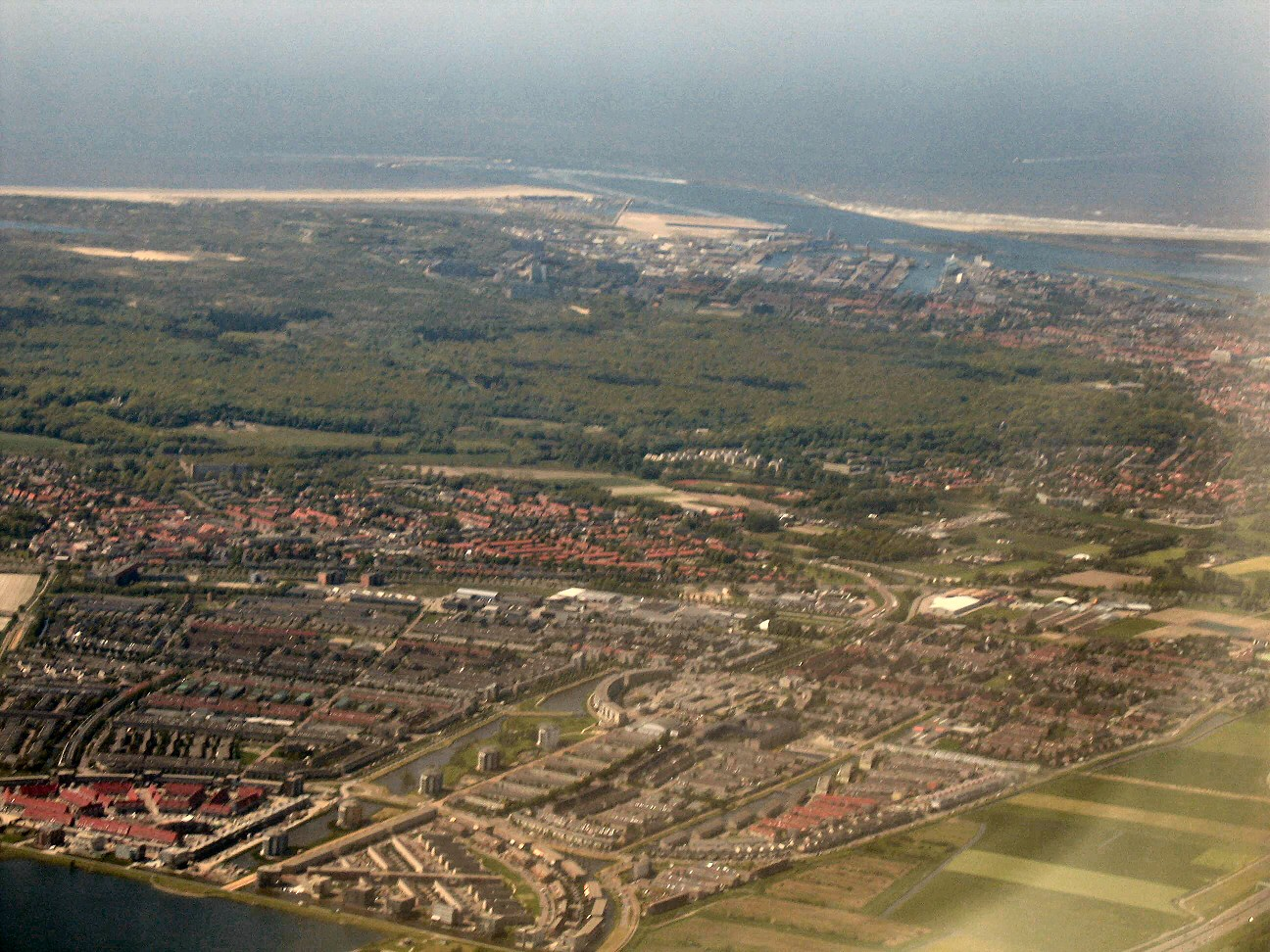
- Aerial view of Velsen

- Flag Coat of arms

- Location in North Holland
- Coordinates: 52°28′N 4°37′E
- Country: Netherlands
- Province: North Holland
- Region: Amsterdam metropolitan area

Government
  - Body: Municipal council
  - Mayor: Frank Dales (D66)

Area
  - Total: 63.17 km^{2} (24.39 sq mi)
  - Land: 45.20 km^{2} (17.45 sq mi)
  - Water: 17.97 km^{2} (6.94 sq mi)
- Elevation: 6 m (20 ft)

Population (January 2021)
  - Total: 68,617
  - Density: 1,518/km^{2} (3,930/sq mi)
- Demonym: Velsenaar
- Time zone: UTC+1 (CET)
  - Summer (DST): UTC+2 (CEST)
- Postcode: 1950–1951, 1970–1992, 2070–2082
- Area code: 023, 0251, 0255
- Website: www.velsen.nl

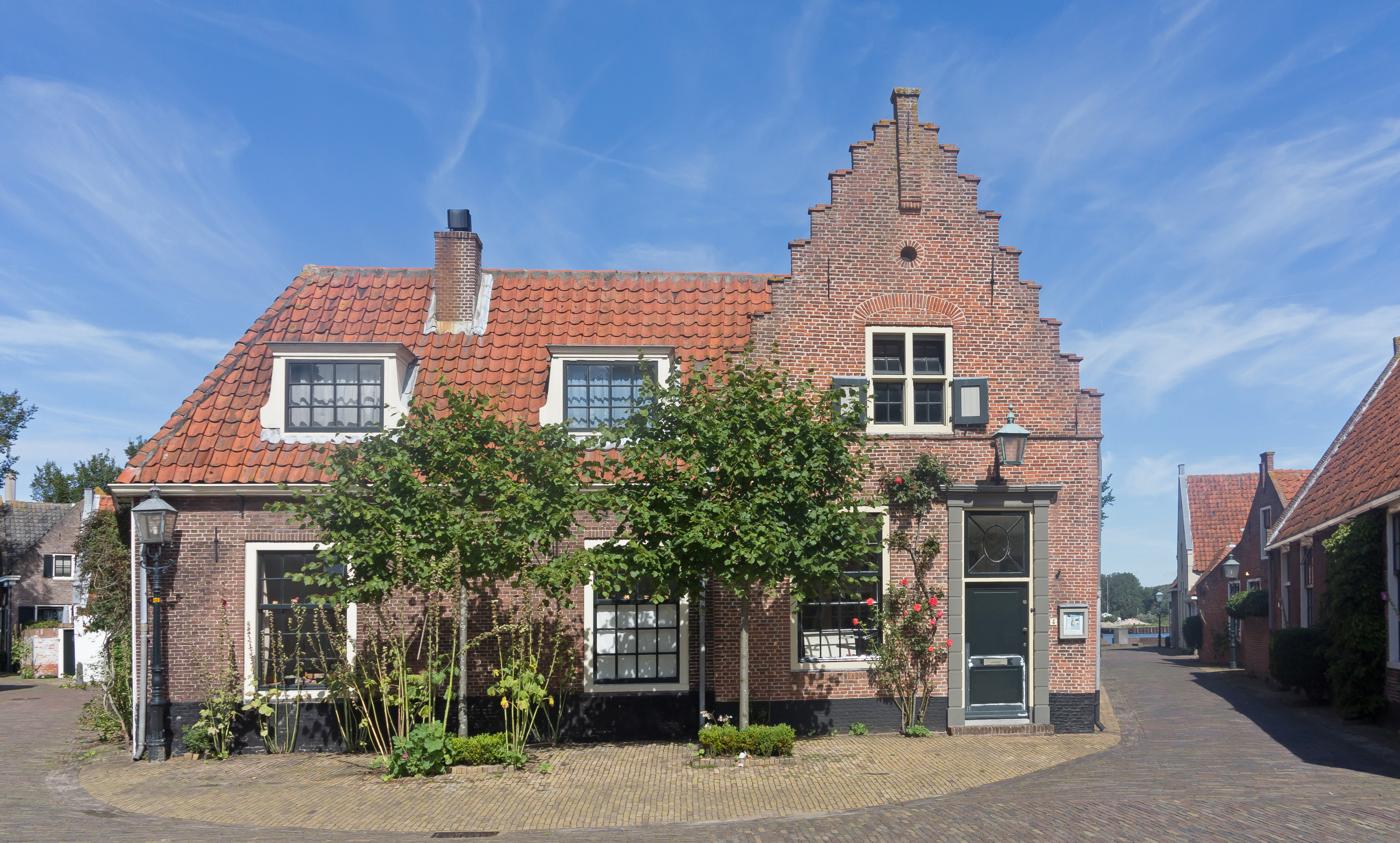
Velsen, monumental house

Velsen (Dutch pronunciation: [ˈvɛlzə(n)]) is a municipality in the Netherlands, in the province of North Holland. It is located on both sides of the North Sea Canal.

On the north side of the North Sea Canal there is a major steel plant, Tata Steel IJmuiden, formerly known as Koninklijke Hoogovens (the town of IJmuiden is actually located south of the canal). The headquarters of the Koninklijke Nederlandse Redding Maatschappij is located in IJmuiden.

The Kennemerstrand beach on the south side of the canal is at the end of the Kennemerboulevard, which runs south of the Seaport Marina.

To the south is the beach of Bloemendaal aan Zee. In between is a nude beach.

== Population centres ==
The municipality of Velsen consists of the following towns and villages:

- on the north of the North Sea Canal:
  - Velsen-Noord
- on the south of the North Sea Canal:
  - Velsen-Zuid, Driehuis, IJmuiden, Santpoort-Noord, Santpoort-Zuid and Velserbroek, and the parts Oosterbroek and Buitenhuizen of the recreation area Spaarnwoude.

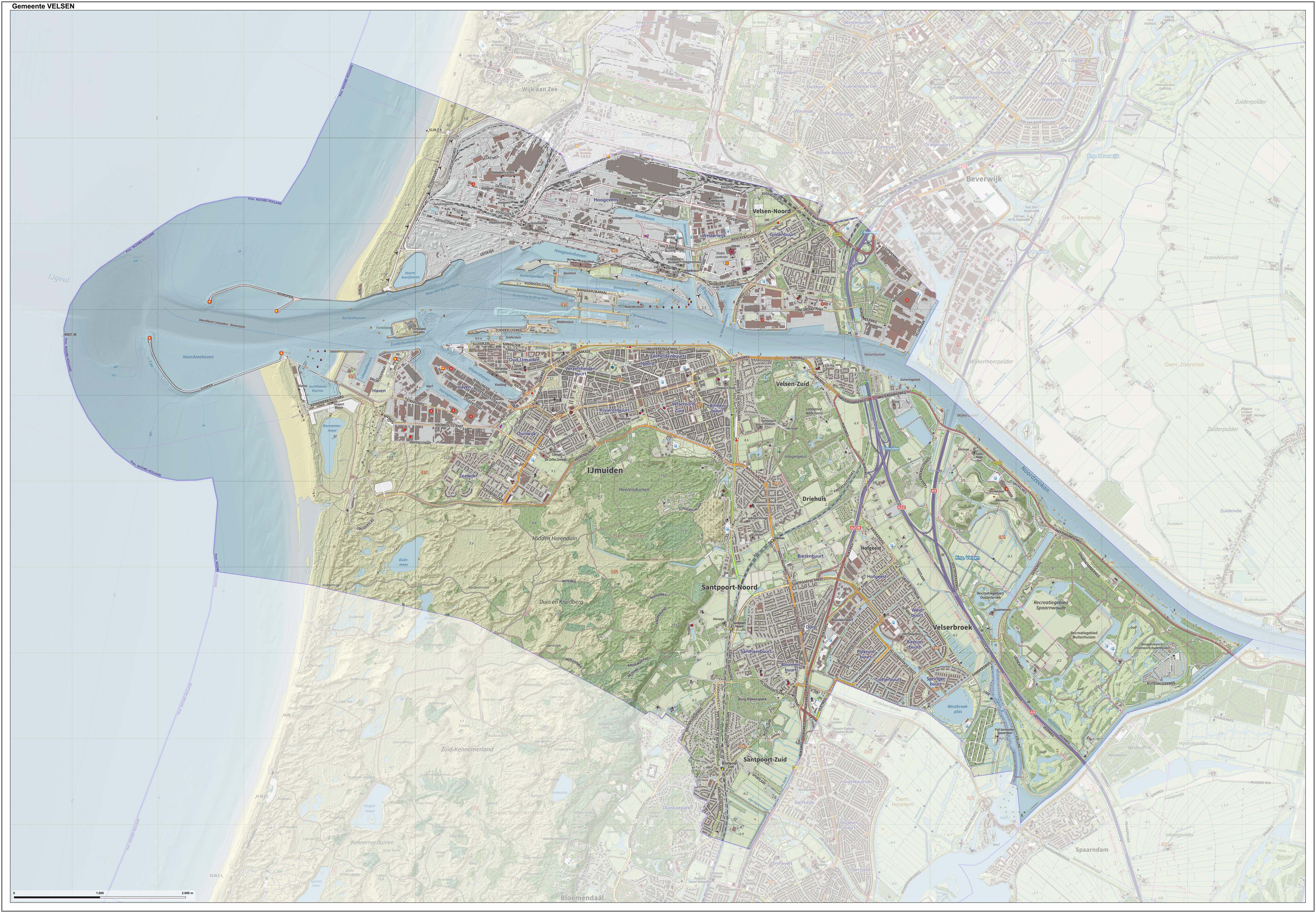
Map of municipality of Velsen, June 2015

== Transport ==
In Velsen, there are the following connections across the North Sea Canal:

- A railway tunnel between the stations of Driehuis and Beverwijk.
- Road tunnels, from north to south:
  - Wijker Tunnel (A9)
  - Velser Tunnel next to the railway tunnel. (A22)
- A ferry
- A road across the lock complex
- Railway stations: Driehuis, Santpoort Noord, Santpoort Zuid

Also, there used to be the Fast Flying Ferry to Amsterdam.
There was railway link between IJmuiden and Amsterdam, the IJmondlijn, that closed in 1999.

== Local government ==
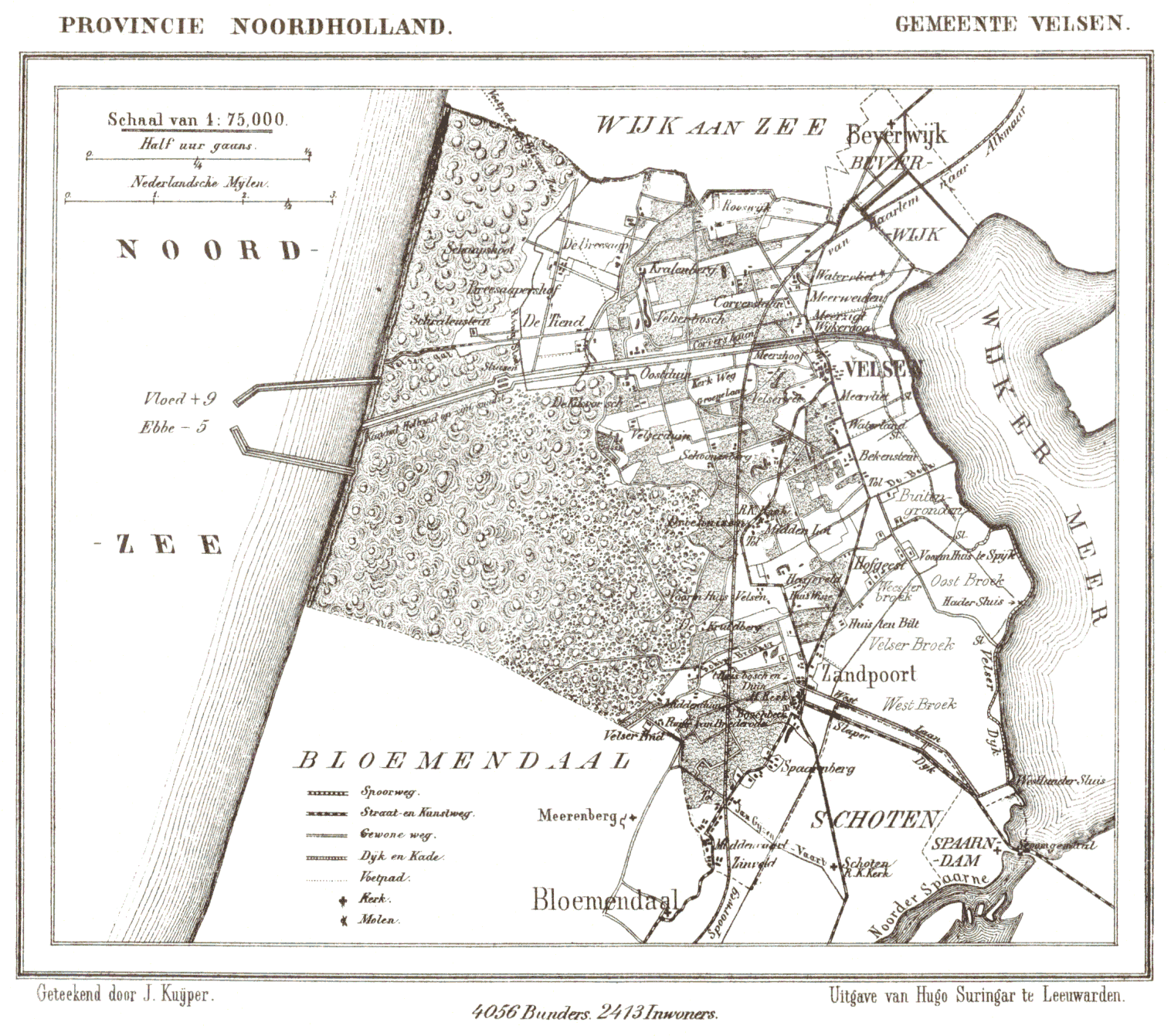
Velsen in 1867. The North Sea Canal is shown as planned and partially under construction.

The municipal council of Velsen consists of 33 seats, which divided at the 2026 local elections as follows:

- Forum for Democracy - 8 seats
- D66 - 6 seats
- Velsen Lokaal - 5 seats
- VVD - 4 seats
- Sterk Velsen- 3 seats
- GL - 3 seats
- PvdA - 2 seats
- CDA - 2 seats
- Liberaal Blauw - 1 seat
- CU - 1 seat

== History ==
The ruins of a Roman naval base at Velsen discovered starting in 1945 are believed to be ancient Flevum, which is listed as Phleoum, Romanized to Phleum, in Ptolemy (2.10).

== Twin towns ==
Velsen is twinned with

- Bergisch Gladbach, a city in North Rhine-Westphalia, Germany and
- Galle, a port city on the southwestern tip of Sri Lanka

== Notable people ==
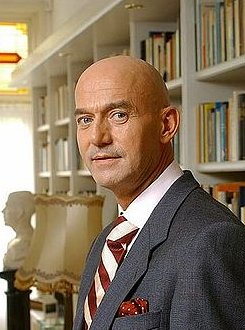
Pim Fortuyn, 2002

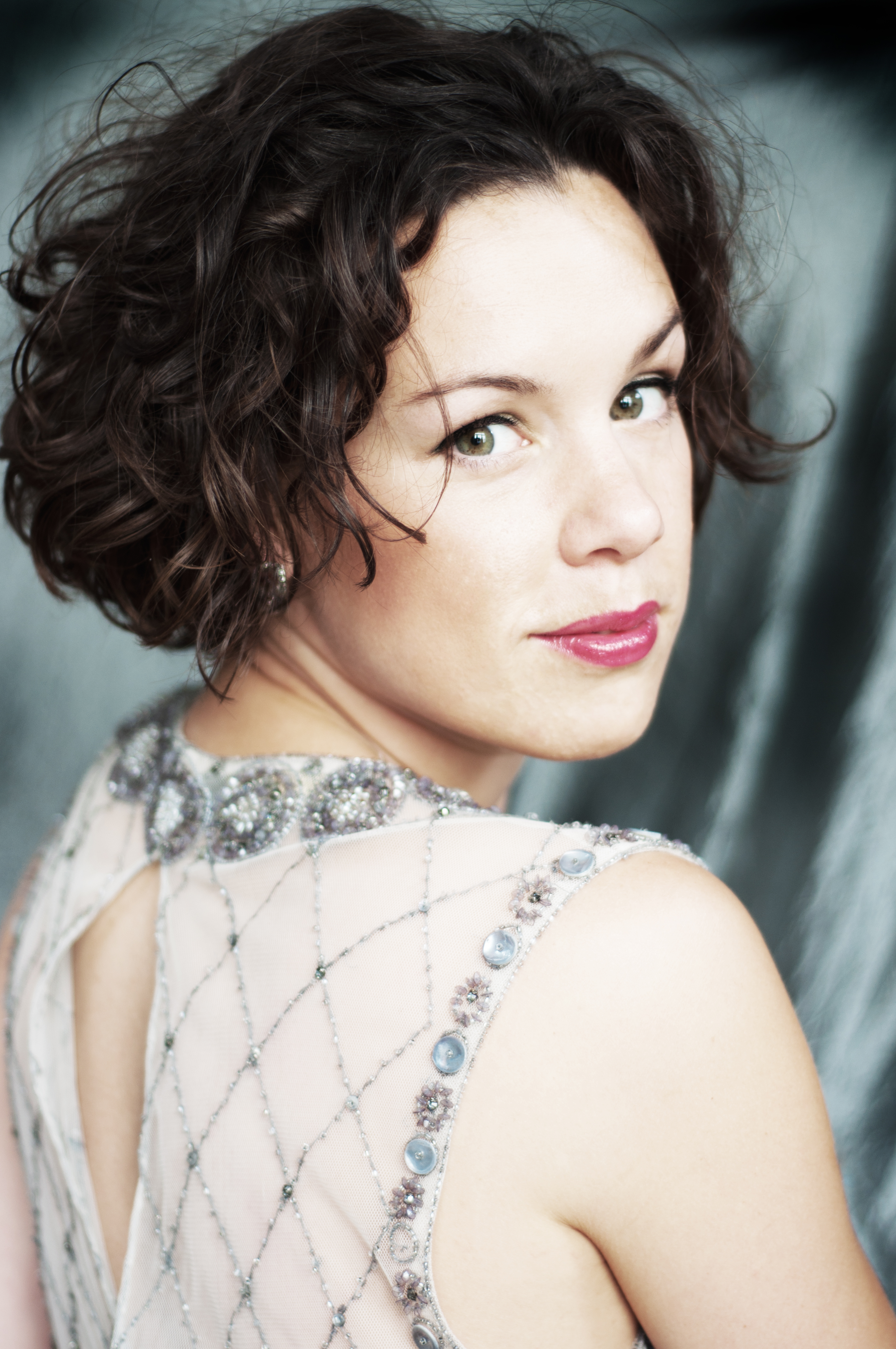
Lenneke Ruiten, 2015

- Saint Engelmund of Velsen (died ca.739) an English-born missionary to Frisia
- Lieutenant Colonel Thomas Colclough Watson VC (1867 in Velsen – 1917) a recipient of the Victoria Cross
- Jan van der Hoeve (1878 in Santpoort – 1952) a ophthalmologist who described Waardenburg syndrome in 1916
- Karel Niessen (1895 in Velsen – 1967) a theoretical physicist, studied quantum mechanics
- Joop Doderer (1921 in Velsen – 2005) an actor who played Swiebertje
- Annie Palmen (1926 in IJmuiden – 2000) a singer, participated in the 1963 Eurovision Song Contest
- Hans de Boer (born 1937 in Velsen) a retired politician and former minister
- Cornelis Vreeswijk (1937 in IJmuiden – 1987) a Swedish singer-songwriter, poet and actor
- Pim Fortuyn (1948 in Driehuis – 2002) a controversial politician who was assassinated
- Jan Luiten van Zanden (born 1955 in IJmuiden) an economic historian and academic
- Peter Klashorst (1957 in Santpoort– 2024) a painter, sculptor and photographer
- Hans van de Ven (born 1958 in Velsen) an academic authority on the recent history of China
- Bernard Berkhout (born 1961 in Santpoort) a family doctor and a jazz clarinetist
- Franc Weerwind (born 1964) a politician, Mayor of Velsen 2009 to 2015
- Cees Krijnen (born 1969 in Velsen) an artist and a theatre actor
- Marie-José van der Kolk (born 1974 in IJmuiden), stage name Loona, a singer, songwriter and dancer
- Lenneke Ruiten (born 1977 in Velsen) a soprano

=== Sport ===
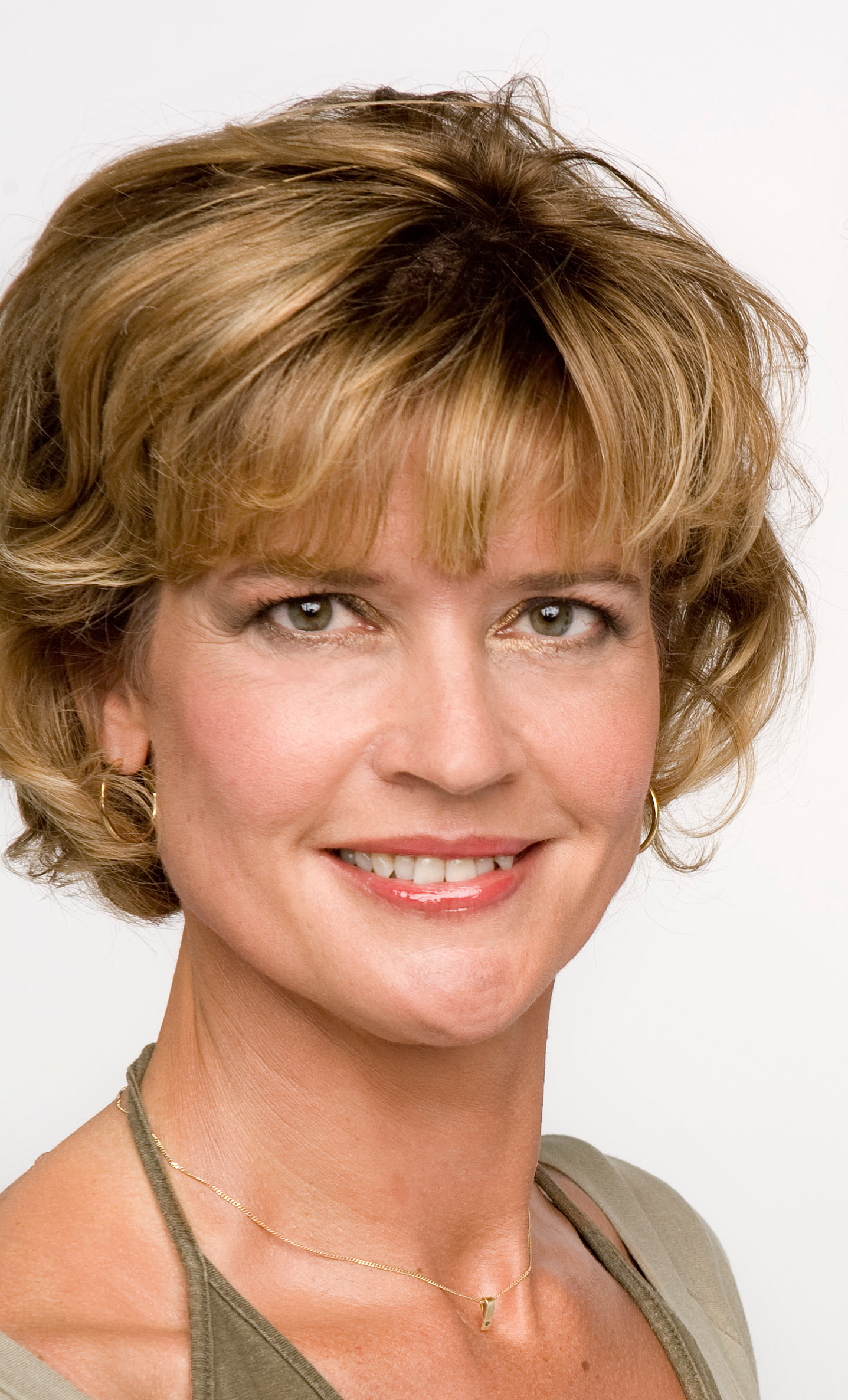
Olga Commandeur, 2008

- Adriaan de Groot (1914 in Santpoort – 2006) a chess master and psychologist
- Gerrit Voorting (1923 in Velsen – 2015) a Dutch road cyclist, silver medallist at the 1948 Summer Olympics
- Ilja Keizer (born 1944 in IJmuiden) a retired middle-distance runner, competed at the 1968 and 1972 Summer Olympics
- Piet Huyg (1951–2019) a footballer, 349 club caps with HFC Haarlem
- Eltjo Schutter (born 1953 in Driehuis) a retired Dutch decathlete and gynaecologist, competed at the 1976 Summer Olympics
- Olga Commandeur (born 1958 in Velsen) track and field athlete, competed in the 1984 Summer Olympics
- Ingrid Haringa (born 1964 in Velsen) a police officer, former speed skater and racing cyclist
- Stella de Heij (born 1968 in Driehuis) a former field hockey goalkeeper, team bronze medallist at the 1996 Summer Olympics
- René Bot (born 1978 in Velsen) a retired footballer with 262 club caps with De Graafschap
- Ronny van Es (born 1978 in Velsen) a retired footballer with 380 club caps
- Linda Bolder (born 1988 in Velserbroek) a Dutch-born Israeli Olympic judoka
- Joël Veltman (born 1992 in IJmuiden) a professional footballer with 160 caps with AFC Ajax

and

- the Lords of Van Brederode, from the 12thC. to the 17thC., a noble family from Brederode Castle near Santpoort

== Gallery ==
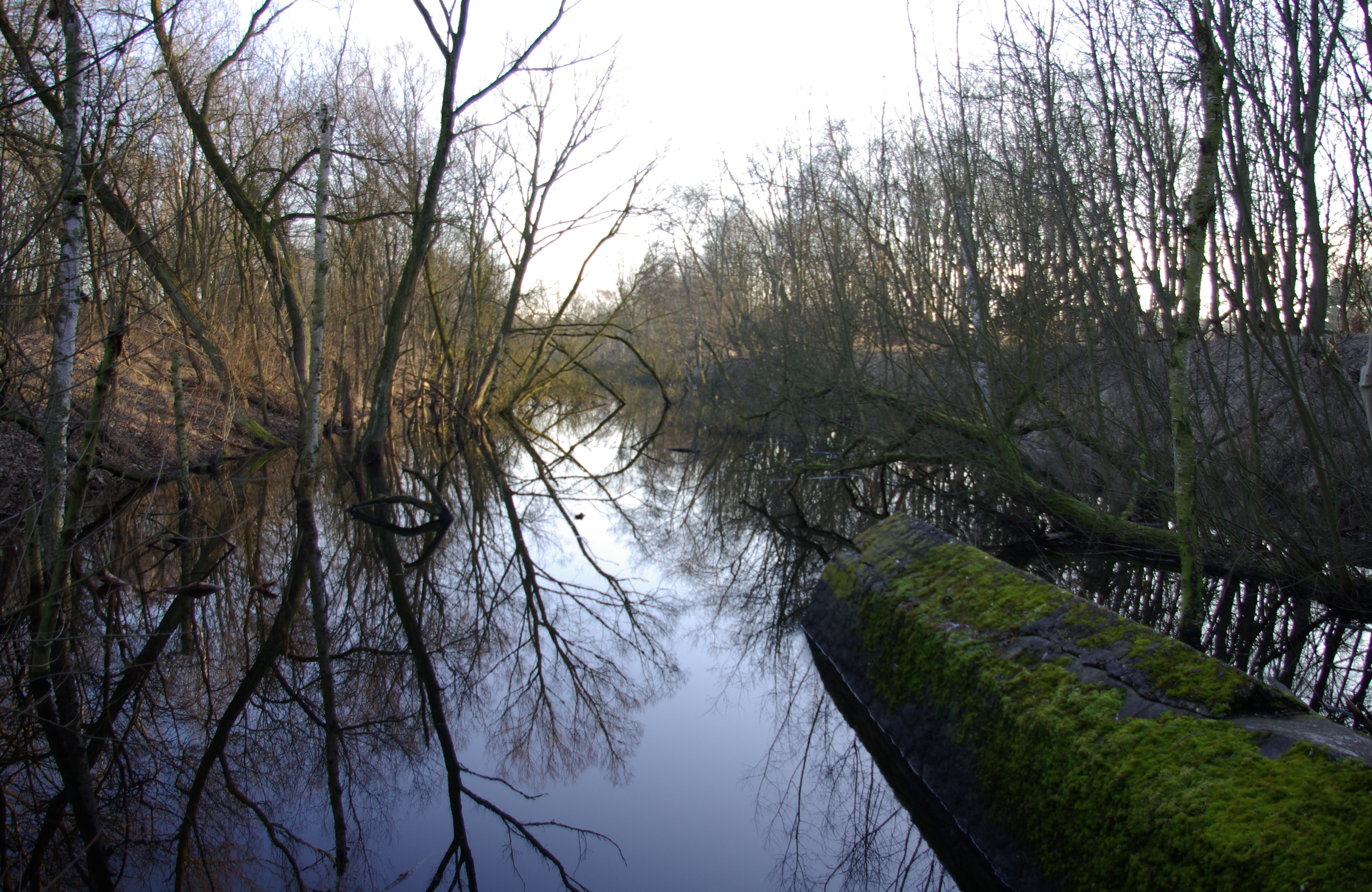
Landfront IJmuiden

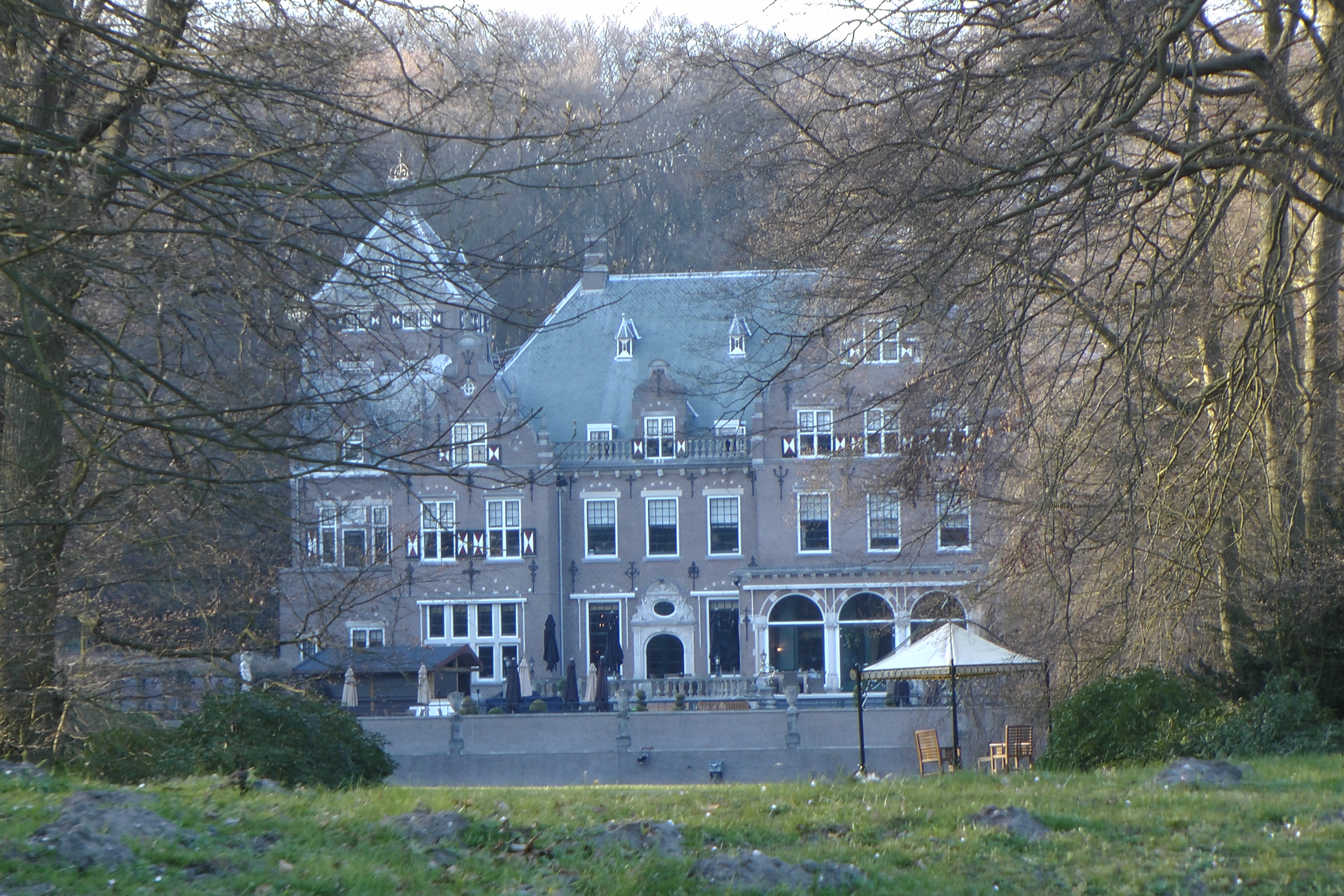
Santpoort - panoramio

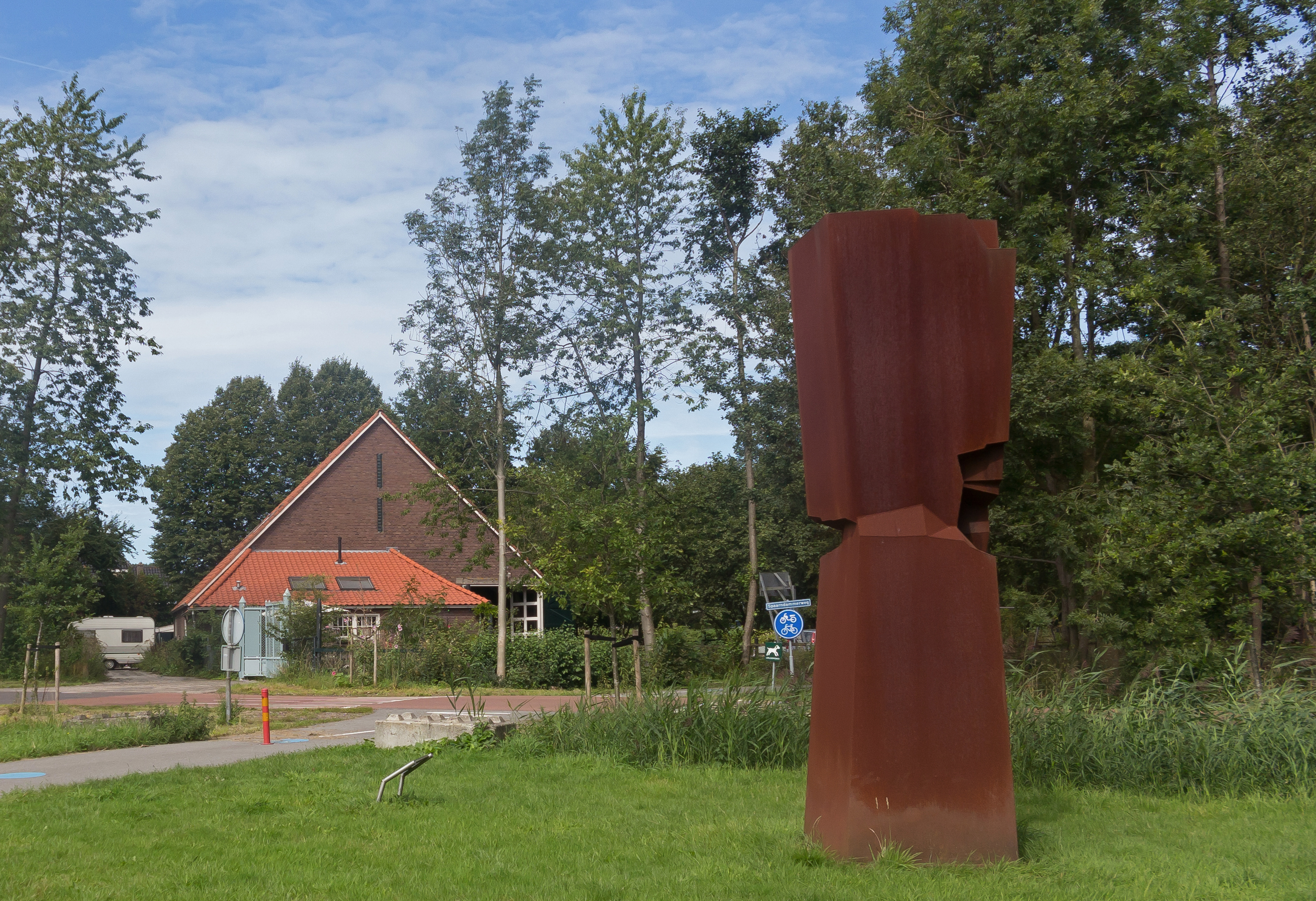
Recreatiegebied Spaarnwoude

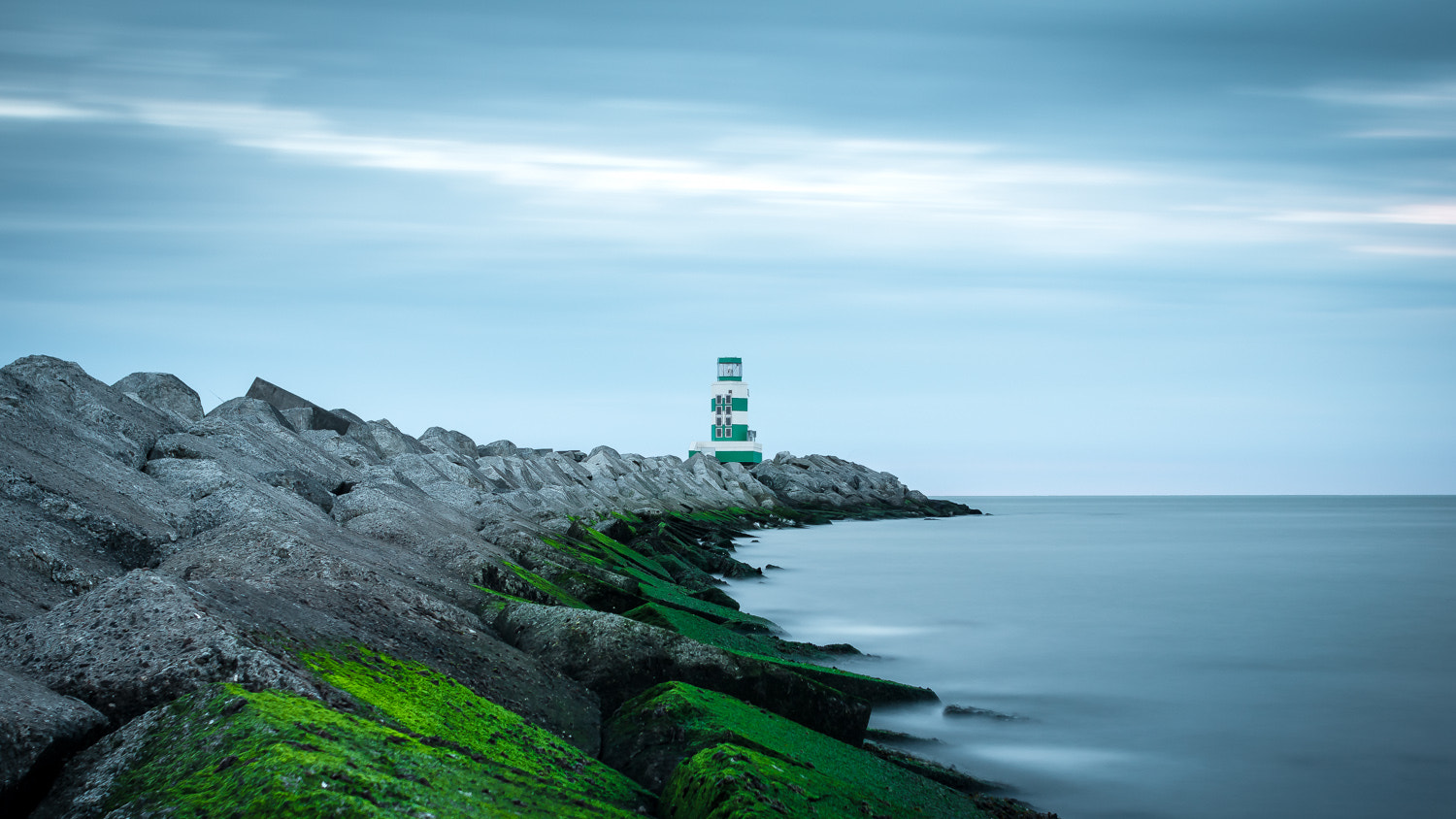
Zakkenroller
