= Brandende liefde =

1983 film

- Theatrical release poster
- Directed by: Ate de Jong
- Written by: Ate de Jong; Rob Houwer
- Based on: Brandende liefde by Jan Wolkers
- Produced by: Rob Houwer
- Starring: Monique van de Ven; Peter Jan Rens; Huub van der Lubbe; Berend Boudewijn; Siem Vroom
- Cinematography: Paul van den Bos
- Edited by: Edgar Burcksen
- Music by: Laurens van Rooyen
- Production company: Verenigde Nederlandsche Filmcompagnie
- Distributed by: Tuschinski Film Distribution
- Release date: 15 September 1983
- Running time: 96 minutes
- Country: Netherlands
- Language: Dutch

Brandende liefde (Dutch for Burning Love) is a 1983 Dutch drama film directed by Ate de Jong.

== Cast ==
- Monique van de Ven as Anna
- Peter Jan Rens as Jan Bosman
- Ellen Vogel as Mademoiselle Bonnema
- Huub van der Lubbe as Kees van de Plasse
- Siem Vroom as Vader Bonnema
- Berend Boudewijn as Louis Laman
- Hetty Blok as Executrice Testamentaire
- Bernard Mesguich as Cultureel Attaché (as Bernard Mesquish)
- Eliza Naber as Parisienne
- Maya van den Broecke as Sonja
- Marc Klein Essinkas Eric
- Swaantje Rutten as Louise
- Jitske Dijkstra as Lida
- Johan Mittertreiner as Dansleraar
- Robert de Jonker as Knul
