= International Vocal Competition 's-Hertogenbosch =

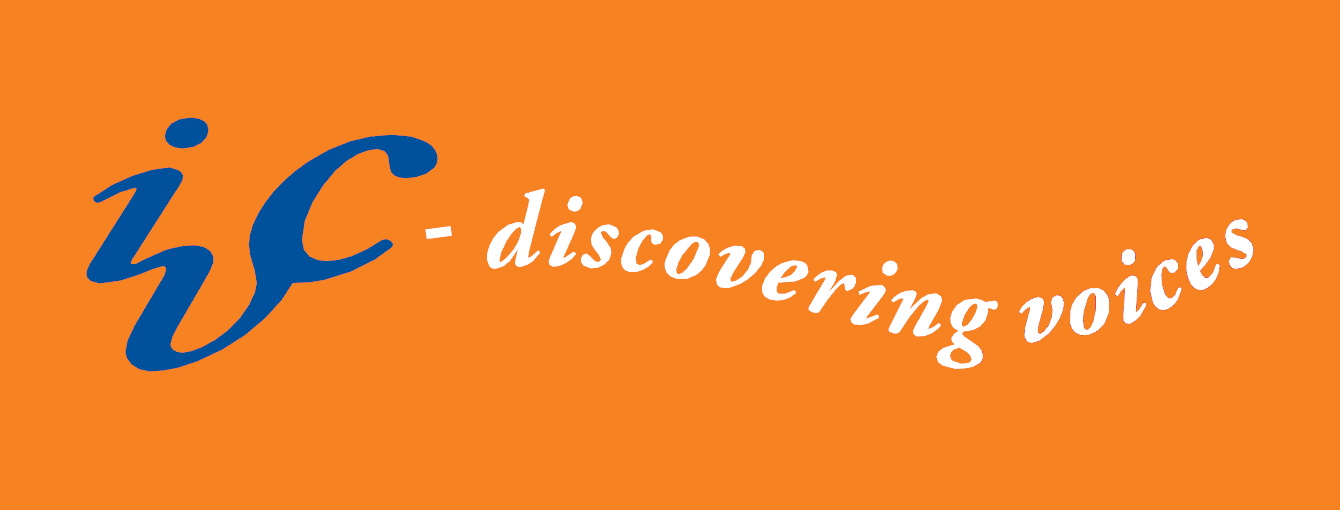
Logo

The International Vocal Competition 's-Hertogenbosch (IVC); is a music competition for classical singing founded in 1954. It is the only classical vocal competition in the Netherlands that also focuses on opera, oratorio and Lied.

This yearly event is organized by the International Vocal Competition 's-Hertogenbosch (IVC). The IVC is a member of the World Federation of International Music Competitions since 1959. The IVC offers singers the chance to perform for casting directors, concert managements, impresarios, the media and a concert and theatergoing audience.

Alongside its competition, the IVC also presents master classes, workshops, summer schools and concerts. Concerts are organized in collaboration with various organizations. The IVC also provides advice on repertoire, career possibilities, media management and auditioning.

The IVC has helped launch the careers of many internationally renowned singers (see List of notable IVC alumni). Annett Andriesen, herself an opera singer and a prizewinner of the IVC in 1975, was head of the IVC from 2008 until 2018. She has since been replaced by Ivan van Kalmthout. From 1 September 2023, British countertenor Andrew Watts has been appointed General and artistic director of the IVC.

The IVC is open to singers of all nationalities who have had conservatory training or have reached an equivalent level. The competition has two categories: Opera/oratorio and Lied Duo.

== List of notable IVC alumni ==
Year	Edition	1st Prize	2nd Prize
1954	1	Annette de la Bije, Aukje Karsemeyer, Hans Wilbrink, Frans Meulemans	Henriëtte Willems, Tim Jacobs
1955	2	Eva Bornemann, Jean Capiaux	Arjan Blanken, Willem van der Sluys, Haasteren van Albert
1956	3	Elly Ameling, Adna Graham, Halina Lukomska, Ladeslav Mraz	George David Galliver, Günther Wilhelms
1957	4	Maria van Dongen	Valerie Cardnell, Ranken Bushby, Derek Stroud
1958	5	Elisabeth Simon, Ranken Bushby	Halina Slonicka, Maria Antonietta Sighele, Aurelio Estanisko, Bernard Kruysen
1959	6	Arthur Loosli, Zofia Janukowicz, Mariëtte Dierckx	Maya Breier, Lia Rottier, Juliana Falk, Djurdjevka Cakarevic, Harold Gray
1960	7	Karoly Schmidt, Lisé Arséquet, Irene Mierzwiak, John Wakefield	Sigurdur Björnsson, Bert Olsson
1961	8	Thomas Carey, Yvonne Minton, Alfons Bartha	Olga Maddalena, Karin Oster, Margaret Duckworth, Kenneth John Bowen, Hendrik Smit, John Wiles
1962	9	Jules Bastin, Zofia Anna Wilma	Julijana Anastasijevic, Frederick Gersten, Richard Novák
1963	10	Dan Iordachescu, Margaret Duckworth	Rina Cornelissens, Eva Debrowska, Lucienne van Deyck, Jean Jacques Schreurs, Antoni Dutkiewicz, Peter Leeming
1964	11	Janka Békas, Borena Kinas-Mikolajczak	Marie Hayward, Anne Malewicz-Madey, Geoffrey Shovelton, Patrick Costeloe
1965	12	Viorica Cortez, Ileana Cotrubaș, Siegmund Nimsgern	Faith Pulston Jones, Pompeiu Harasteanu
1966	13	Marina Krilovici, Ludovic Spiess	Ana Maria Miranda, Norma Lerer, Marco Bakker
1967	14	Louis Williams, Stefanka Popangelova	Sally Le Sage, Heljä Angervo, Nigel Wickens, Josef Loibl
1968	15	Hans-George Dahmen, Csilla Zentai	Angela Beale, Wendy Eathorne, Ria Bollen, Oriel Sutherland, Ilie Baciu
1969	16	Maria Slatinaru, Else Paaske, Walker Wyatt	Leslie Johnson, Karl Markus, Hubert Waber, Maurice Brown

- Elly Ameling
- Jules Bastin
- Measha Brueggergosman
- Ileana Cotrubaș
- Viorica Cortez
- Veronica Amarres
- Peter Gijsbertsen
- Robert Holl
- Thomas Hampson
- Howard Haskin
- Nadine Koutcher
- Petra Lang
- Yvonne Minton
- Nelly Miricioiu
- Jard van Nes
- Yevgeny Nesterenko
- Vladimir Pankratov
- Lenneke Ruiten
- Wolfgang Schöne
- Elżbieta Szmytka
- Thomas Thomaschke
- Stefania Toczyska
- Pretty Yende
- Ruth Ziesak
- 2008 Hansung Yoo
- 2026 Lea Shaw

== 58th International Vocal Competition 's-Hertogenbosch 2025 – Theatre in Song ==
The 58th International Vocal Competition Theater in Song will be held from 25 – 28 September at Theater aan de Parade in 's-Hertogenbosch, Netherlands.

The IVC offers young and talented singers the chance to perform for an international jury, casting directors, concert managements, impresarios, the media and public. The total prize money of the Theatre in Song competition amounts to €32.500. For more information about criteria, applications and Preliminary Rounds see www.ivc.nu

The International Jury of 2025 includes Iain Burnside Jury President, BBC Radio 3 programme maker, soprano Yvonne Kenny, bass Robert Holl, conductor, musicologist and artistic director of Musica Viva Australia Paul Kildea, Anita Crowe, programming Royal Concertgebouw, director Simon Burney and Andrew Comben, chief executive officer at Britten Pears Arts.
