= Joop Doderer =

Dutch actor (1921–2005)

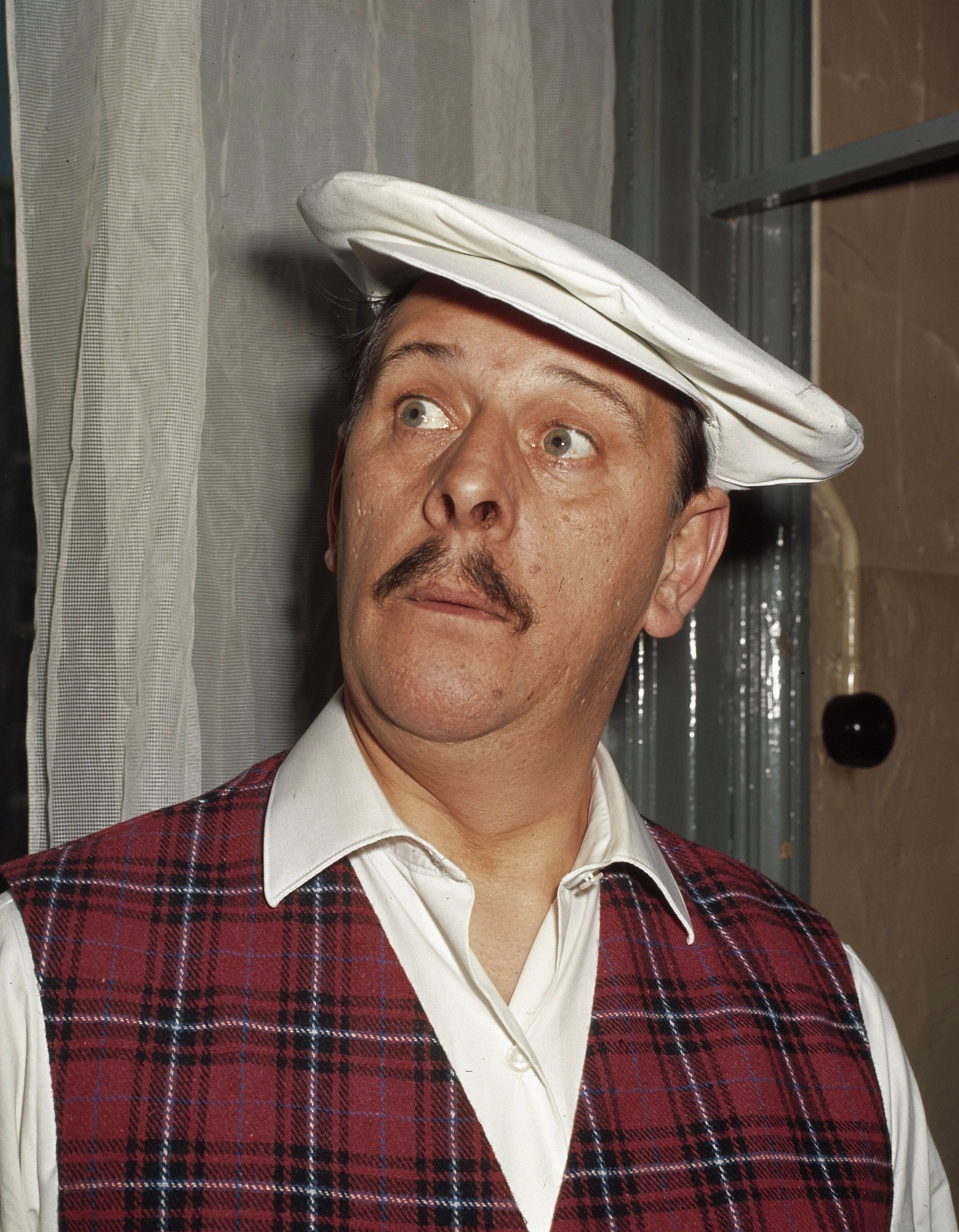
- Joop Doderer in No no Nanette
- Born: Johan Heinrich Doderer; 28 August 1921; Velsen, Netherlands
- Died: 22 September 2005 (aged 84); Roelofarendsveen, Netherlands
- Resting place: Zorgvlied cemetery
- Occupation: Actor
- Known for: Swiebertje

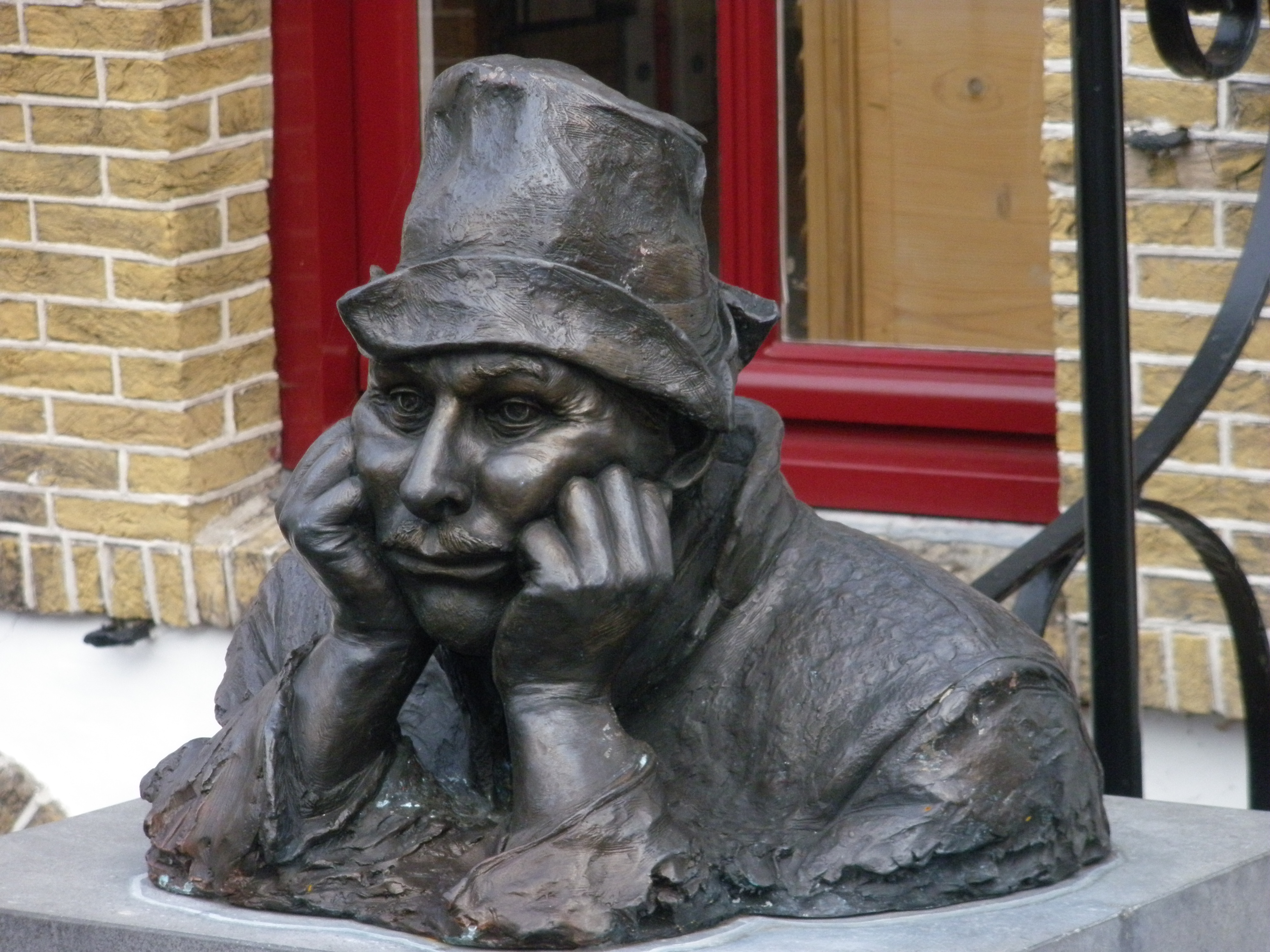
Bust of Joop Doderer as Swiebertje in Oudewater, Netherlands

Johan Heinrich (Joop) Doderer (28 August 1921 – 22 September 2005) was a Dutch actor, well known for his role as the tramp Swiebertje in the eponymous television series. The series ran for 17 seasons between 1955 and 1975, and was broadcast by the NCRV. Besides the role of Swiebertje, Doderer played in dozens of radio and television programs, played the role of Alfred Doolittle in My Fair Lady, acted in Dutch and English movies, and appeared on stage in comedies, musicals, cabaret and dramas.

== Biography ==
Doderer was born in Velsen, but brought up in Amsterdam. After finishing the Hogereburgerschool, he persuaded his parents to let him take acting lessons. In 1939, aged 18, he was rejected by the Amsterdam acting school for "lack of talent". Instead, he started his acting career as an extra at the Nederlandsch Toneel, which enabled him to study actors like Cor van der Lugt Melsert.

After World War II, he played in many comedies and musicals. For seven years he was part of the ensemble of Wim Sonneveld, where he met his first wife Conny Stuart. He also acted in some movies (Het Wonderlijke leven van Willem Parel, 1959) and featured on the radio (De bonte dinsdagavondtrein and Koek en ei). From the 1950s onward, Doderer was a star. He often ad-libbed on stage, to the amusement of the audience, but not of his co-players. At the age of 52, he married 21-year-old Ester. Together they had two children.

Between 1955 and 1975 he played Swiebertje on television. In 2001, the series was given the one-time-only Signaal award for the best television show in the past 50 years as voted by Dutch television viewers. Doderer was quite proud of his fame as Swiebertje, although it took him many years after the end of the series to look back positively (see below). In 2003, a bust of Swiebertje was placed in the town of Oudewater, where many of the outdoor scenes of the series were shot.

Doderer was a Ridder in de Orde van Oranje-Nassau (Knight of the Order of Orange-Nassau).

Doderer died in a nursing home in Roelofarendsveen and is buried at Zorgvlied cemetery.

== Swiebertje-effect ==
Being identified with Swiebertje hampered Doderer when playing serious roles after 1975, to the point where on one occasion the audience started singing the theme of Swiebertje when he got on stage. In the Netherlands, this effect of typecasting became known as the "Swiebertje-effect". Doderer even moved to England and there obtained guest roles in television dramas. In 1979, he played a South African agent in The Human Factor, directed by Otto Preminger, alongside Richard Attenborough, Derek Jacobi and John Gielgud.

In the 1990s Doderer finally succeeded in shedding his comedian image, and played serious roles in Dutch theatres under the direction of Ivo van Hove and Ger Thijs.

== Filmography ==
| Year | Title | Role | Notes |
|---|---|---|---|
| 1955 | Het Wonderlijke leven van Willem Parel | De Groninger | |
| 1973 | Op de Hollandse toer | Jan de Buschauffeur | |
| 1979 | Uit elkaar | Businessman | |
| 1979 | The Human Factor | Cornelius Muller | |
| 1980 | Let the Doctor Shove | Pastoor | |
| 1984 | Moord in Extase | De Cock | |
| 1985 | De prooi | Wim Gerritsen | |
| 1989 | Wilde Harten | Ormas | |
| 1995 | Hoogste tijd | Pierre de Vries | |
| 1999 | Little Crumb | Koster | |
| 2001 | De Vriendschap | Prof. Rijckevorsel | |
| 2002 | Pietje Bell | Oude Man #1 | |
| 2013 | A Perfect Man | Hendrik | (final film role) |
