= Het Wonderlijke leven van Willem Parel =

- Directed by: Gerard Rutten
- Written by: Joop Geesink & Gerard Rutten
- Release date: 11 February 1955
- Running time: 91 minutes
- Country: Netherlands
- Language: Dutch

Het Wonderlijke leven van Willem Parel is a 1955 Dutch comedy film directed by Gerard Rutten. It revolves around Wim Sonneveld's comedy character Willem Parel.

== Cast ==
- Wim Sonneveld ... Wim Sonneveld / Willem Parel
- Peronne Hosang ... Hermine Toets van Slinderen
- Femke Boersma ... Angèle (as Femke Talma)
- Hans Kaart ... Huipie
- Herbert Joeks ... Directeur van Radio Omroep 'De Windwijzer'
- Bert van der Linden
- Joop Doderer ... De Groninger
- Rijk de Gooyer ... Pianist
- Thom Kelling ... De Hagenaar
- Ben Aerden
- Jan Apon ... Rechercheur
- Philippe La Chapelle
- Dina Diependaal
- J. Ellerbrak
- Frits Engels
- Will Hollenga barman
