= Julius von Zech-Burkersroda =

German diplomat (1885–1946)

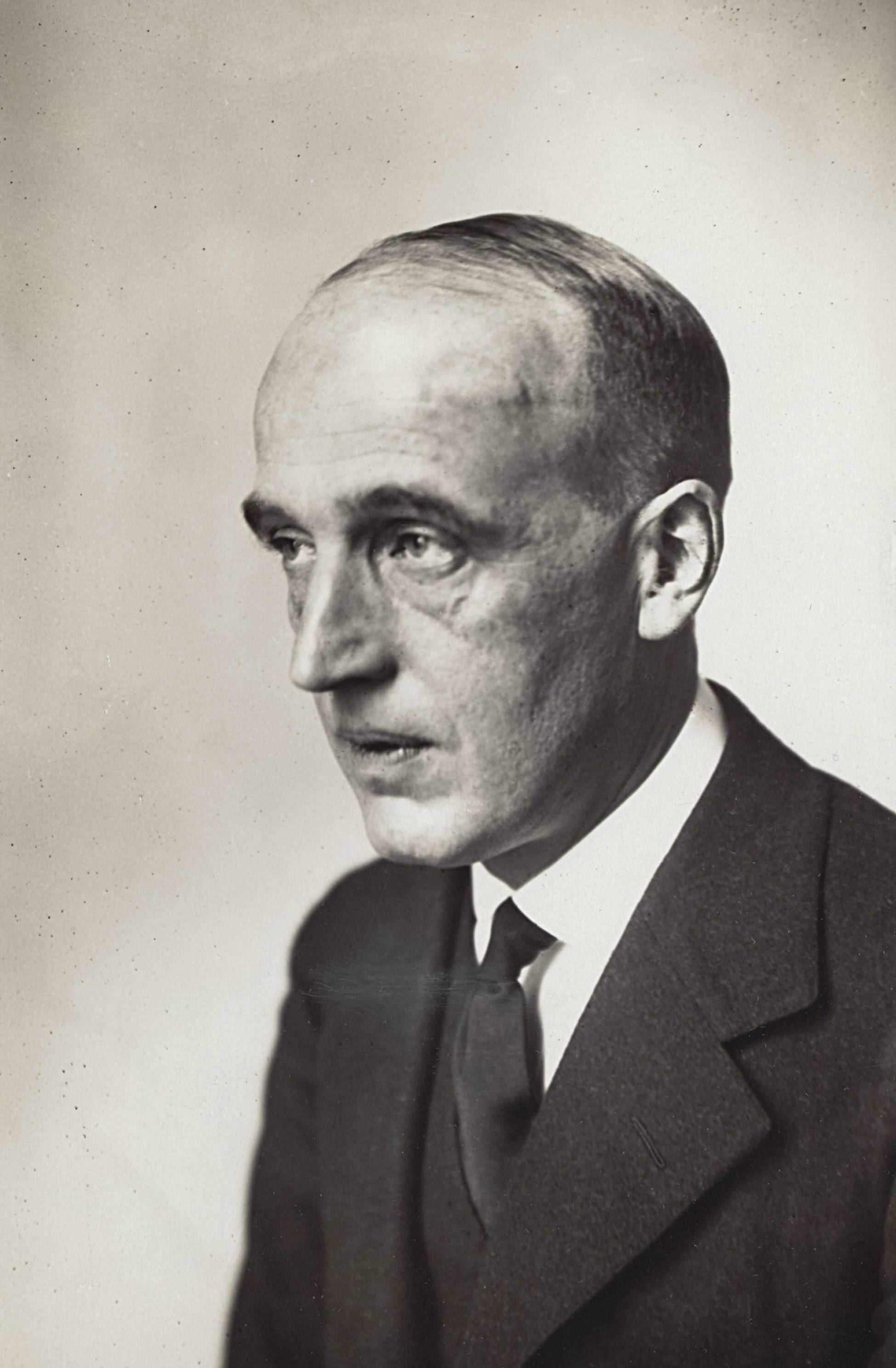
Julius von Zech-Burkersroda

Julius von Zech-Burkersroda (German: Dr Julius Graf von Zech-Burkersroda; 1885–1946) was the German ambassador to The Hague at the start of World War II. He was the son in law of Theobald Bethman-Hollweg who died in 1921.

Zech-Burkersroda studied law at universities in Germany, and was commissioned as an officer in the cavalry. After twenty years' service in the diplomatic corps, he was appointed minister to The Hague in 1928 during the Weimar Republic. He remained at The Hague for the next decade, during which Adolf Hitler gained power in Germany.

In February 1940, Zech-Burkersroda claimed that the Duke of Windsor had leaked the Allied war plans for the defence of Belgium, which the Duke later denied.

In May 1940, Zech-Burkersroda was given the responsibility of passing the German declaration of war against the Netherlands to Dutch foreign minister Eelco van Kleffens. According to Van Kleffens, Zech-Burkersroda was stunned speechless by the actions of the Nazis. On 7 June 1940, he retired from the diplomatic service, shortly after the Netherlands fell to the Nazis. Five years later, after the defeat of Nazi Germany, he was arrested by the Soviet occupation forces, and died shortly thereafter in Bautzen.
