= René Bot =

Dutch footballer

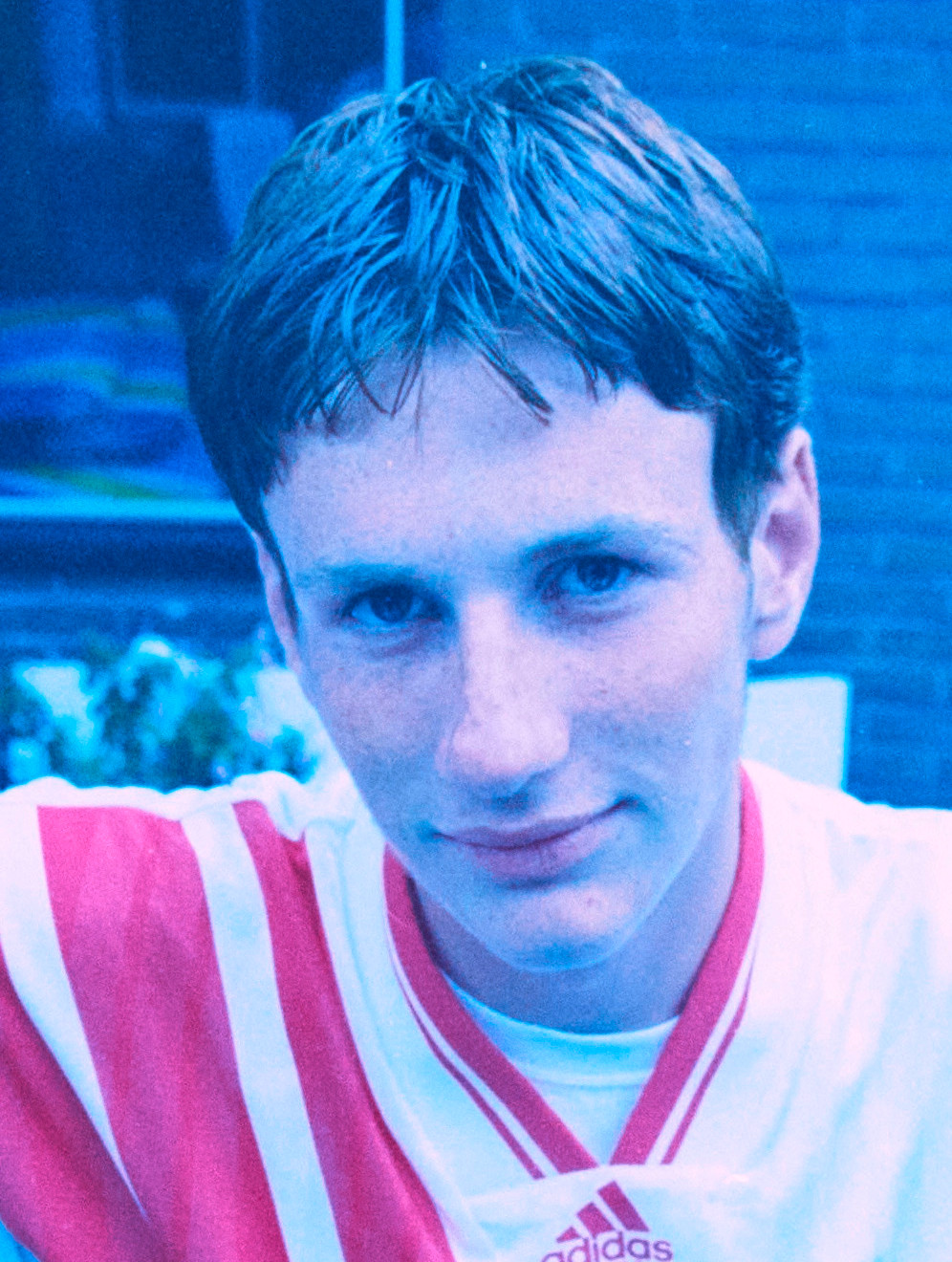
- Rene Bot in 1995

Personal information
- Full name: René Bot
- Date of birth: 6 November 1978 (age 47)
- Place of birth: Velsen, Netherlands
- Height: 1.78 m (5 ft 10 in)
- Position: Right back

Youth career
- Stormvogels Telstar
- Haarlem

Senior career*
Years	Team	Apps	(Gls)
1997–1999	Feyenoord	6	(0)
1999–2009	De Graafschap	261	(5)
2009–2011	AGOVV	12	(1)
Total		279	(6)

International career
1996-1997	Netherlands U-19	5	(0)
- * Club domestic league appearances and goals as of 19 August 2010 (UTC)

René Bot (born 6 November 1978 in Velsen) is a Dutch retired footballer. He normally played as a defender in a right back position, but could also play as a centre back.

== Club career ==
He started his career with Feyenoord but only played six matches in the first team. After a loan period at the club, Bot joined De Graafschap definitively in 1999 and was part of their first team for over ten years. An unyielding defender, Bot became a cult hero at the club due to his tough style and loyalty.

He ended his professional career with Eerste Divisie side AGOVV Apeldoorn. Due to a long period of injuries he only played eleven matches in two years. He later played for amateur side FC Presikhaaf.

== International career ==
Bot played 5 games for the Netherlands national under-19 football team

== Personal life ==
Bot is married to a Dutch woman

As of 2016, Bot works for Doetinchem municipality.
