= Geen paniek =

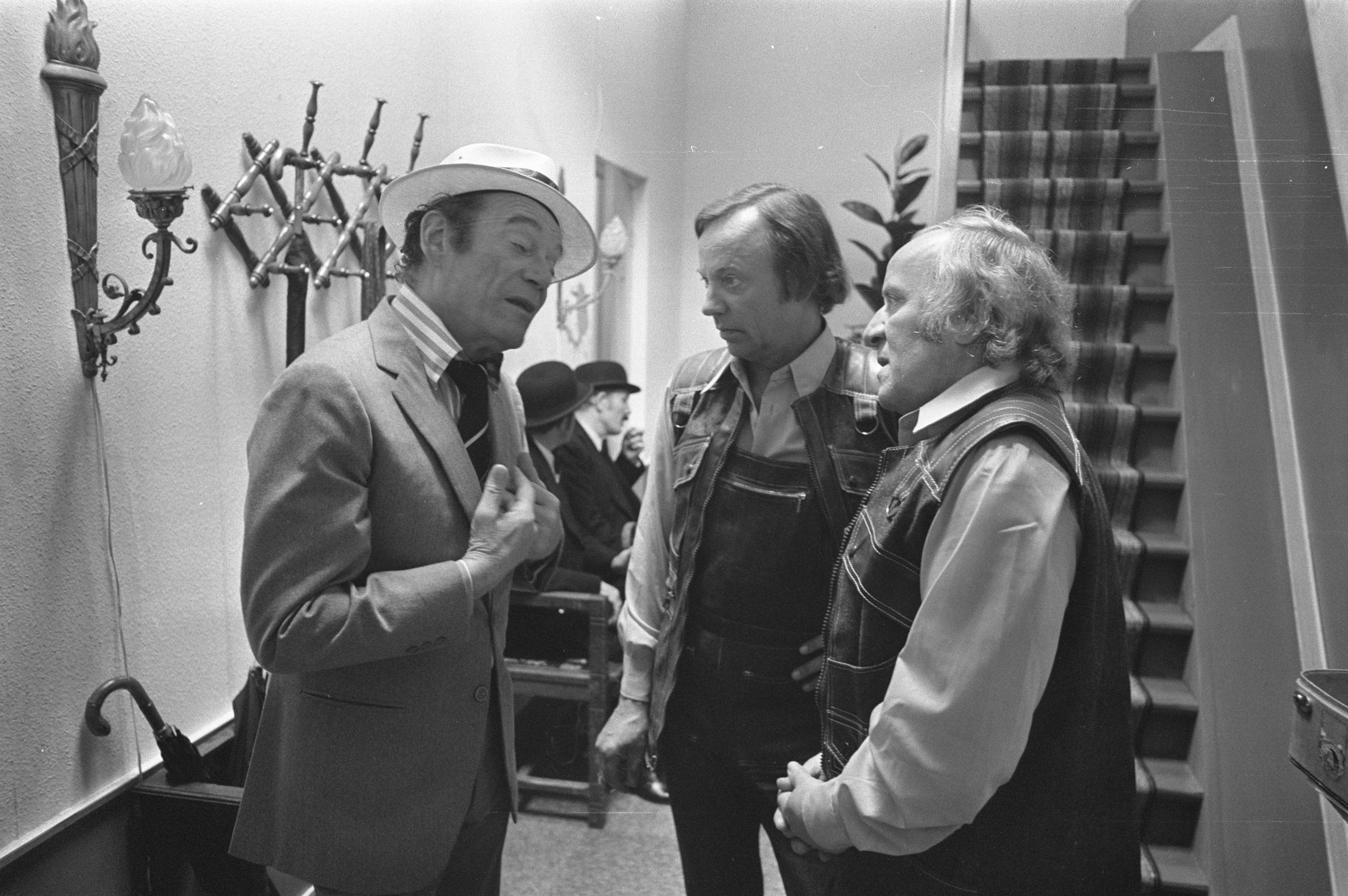
- Still with Eddie Constantine, Rijk de Gooyer, and John Kraaykamp
- Directed by: Ko Koedijk
- Written by: Kees van Kooten; Gijs Versluys
- Cinematography: Ray Parslow
- Music by: Rinus van Galen; Jan Stoeckart
- Production company: Cinécentrum N.V.
- Distributed by: City Film
- Release date: 1973
- Running time: 85 minutes
- Country: Netherlands
- Language: Dutch

Geen paniek is a 1973 Dutch film directed by Ko Koedijk.

== Cast ==
- Rijk de Gooyer as Rijk
- John Kraaykamp as Johnny
- Hetty Blok as Tante Toetje Kluif
- Trudy Labij as Hoertje Kitty
- Marielle Fiolet as Hoertje Roosje
- Hans Boskamp as Henkie Blaffert
- Frans Kokshoorn as Koster
- Niek Engelschman as Pen
- Ton Vos as Rudolf
- Eddie Constantine as Bill Silkstocking, Amerikaans zakenman
- Jon Bluming
- Maya Bouma
- Rita Corita as Tante Ali
