= Lenneke Ruiten =

Dutch soprano (born 1977)

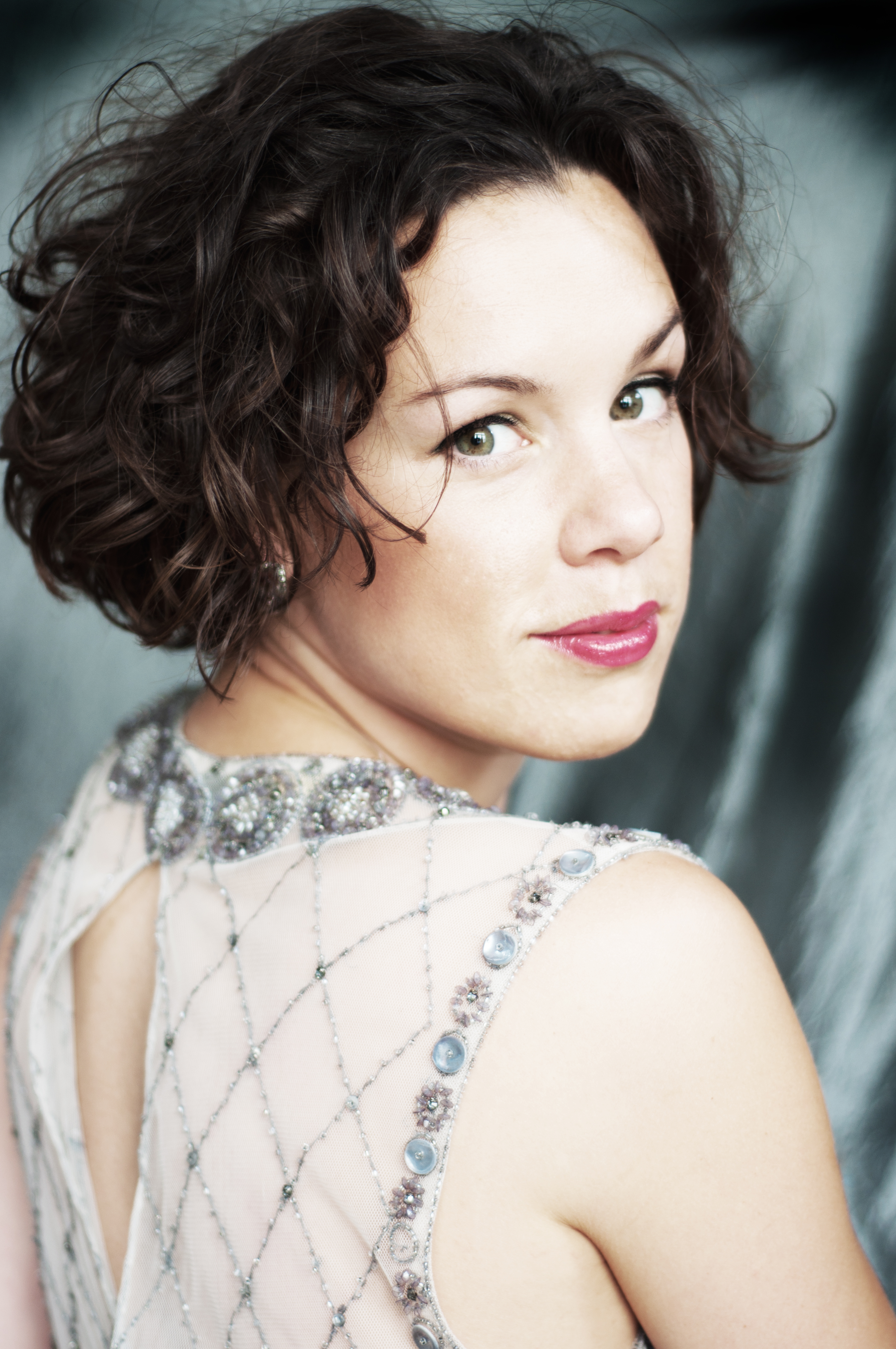
- Born: 1977 (age 48–49); Velsen, Netherlands
- Occupation: Classical soprano
- Website: www.lennekeruiten.com

Lenneke Ruiten (born 1977 in Velsen) is a Dutch soprano. Ruiten studied at the Music Conservatory in Alkmaar and the Conservatorium van Amsterdam, the Royal Conservatory of The Hague, Hochschule für Musik und Theater München, and at the Franz Schubert Institut in Baden bei Wien near Vienna.

She has performed with a wide range of international orchestras and opera companies including the Vienna Philharmonic, the Dutch National Opera and the Monteverdi Choir. Ruiten has recorded works by Bach, Mozart, Brahms and others.

Ruiten had been performing with leading orchestras and conductors on the concert stage for years, when in 2013, at short notice, she stepped into the role of Ophélie in Hamlet at La Monnaie to great acclaim. Ruiten returned to La Monnaie to sing Aspasia in Mitridate, re di Ponto, Giunia in Lucio Silla and as Foxie in The Cunning Little Vixen. Other big debuts followed. In 2014 she made her debut at the Salzburg Festival as Donna Anna in Don Giovanni.

In 2015 Ruiten made her La Scala debut as Giunia in Lucio Silla, and she returned to La Scala as Konstanze in Die Entführung aus dem Serail. Her Dutch National Opera debut came in 2015 as well, as Gretel in Hänsel und Gretel, and she returned as Konstanze (Die Entführung) and La Mort in Henze's Das Floss der Medusa.

In 2016 she sang Fiordiligi in a dark production of Così fan tutte, marking her debut both at the Aix-en-Provence Festival and the Edinburgh International Festival. In 2017, Ruiten made her debut as Lucia in Lucia di Lammermoor at the Lausanne Opera.

Ruiten is a regular guest at the Staatsoper Stuttgart, where she sang roles such as Zerbinetta (Ariadne auf Naxos); Sophie (Der Rosenkavalier); Gilda (Rigoletto) and Pamina (Die Zauberflöte).

== Awards ==
Ruiten won first prize in at the Erna Spoorenberg Oratorio Competition in Netherlands, as well as the International Vocal Competition 's-Hertogenbosch.
