= Agaath Witteman =

Dutch politician (1942–2026)

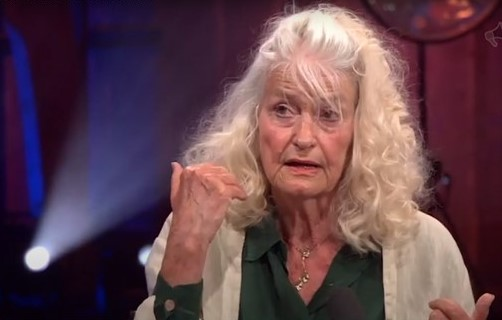
- Witteman in 2020

Member of the Senate of the Netherlands
- In office 10 June 2003 – 12 June 2007

Personal details
- Born: Agatha Catharina Cornelia Witteman Croiset; 5 April 1942 Oegstgeest, German-occupied Netherlands
- Died: 5 June 2026 (aged 84) Breukelen, Netherlands
- Party: PvdA
- Spouse: Hans Croiset (m. 1962–2026)
- Children: Three
- Education: Rijksuniversiteit Leiden; Catholic University of Nijmegen; University of Amsterdam
- Occupation: Writer

Agatha Catharina Cornelia "Agaath" Witteman Croiset (5 April 1942 – 5 June 2026) was a Dutch politician and theatre director. A member of the Labour Party, she served in the Senate from 2003 to 2007.

In 1980, Witteman co-founded the Theater 80 together with actress Femke Boersma and Marcelle Meuleman, among others, which became Theater Persona in 1984.

Witteman died in Breukelen on 5 June 2026, at the age of 84.
