= Engelmund of Velsen =

Saint Engelmond
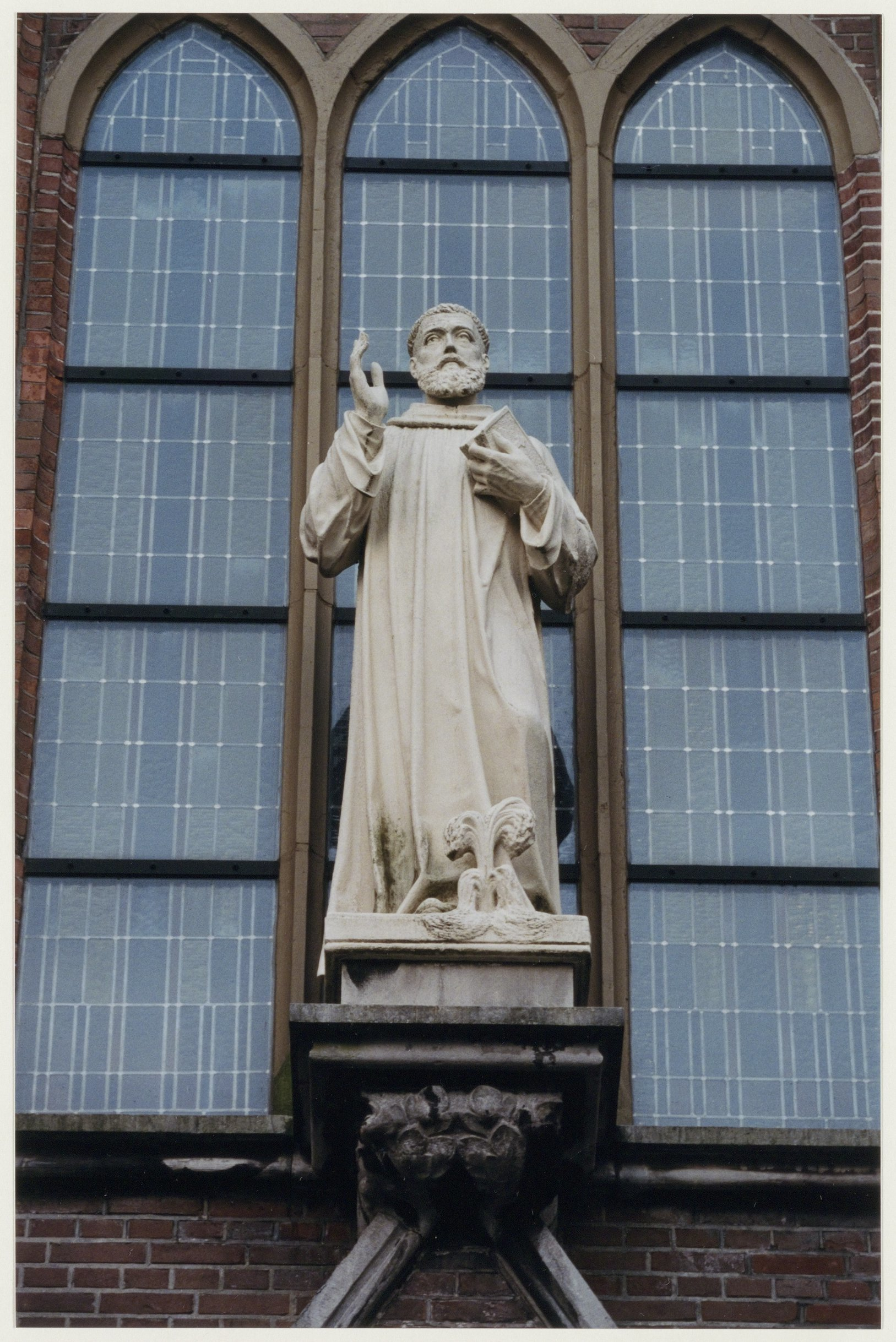
- Sculpture of Engelmund in Velsen
- Died: c. 739 AD
- Venerated in: Roman Catholic Church, Orthodox Church
- Feast: 21 June
- Attributes: depicted as a pilgrim abbot with a fountain springing under his staff
- Patronage: invoked against toothache

Saint Engelmund (Engelmond, Ingelmund) of Velsen (died 14 May c. 739) was an English-born missionary to Frisia. He was educated in his native country and entered the Benedictine Order. He was ordained a priest and later became an abbot.

== Life ==
Although born in England, he had lived in Friesland with his parents and so knew the language. He traveled to Frisia to join Saint Willibrord in evangelizing the region. Engelmund was based at Velsen near Haarlem, where he later died at an advanced age, of fever.

== Iconography ==
Saint Engelmund is depicted as a pilgrim abbot with a fountain springing under his staff.
