= Femke Boersma =

Dutch actress (1935–2026)

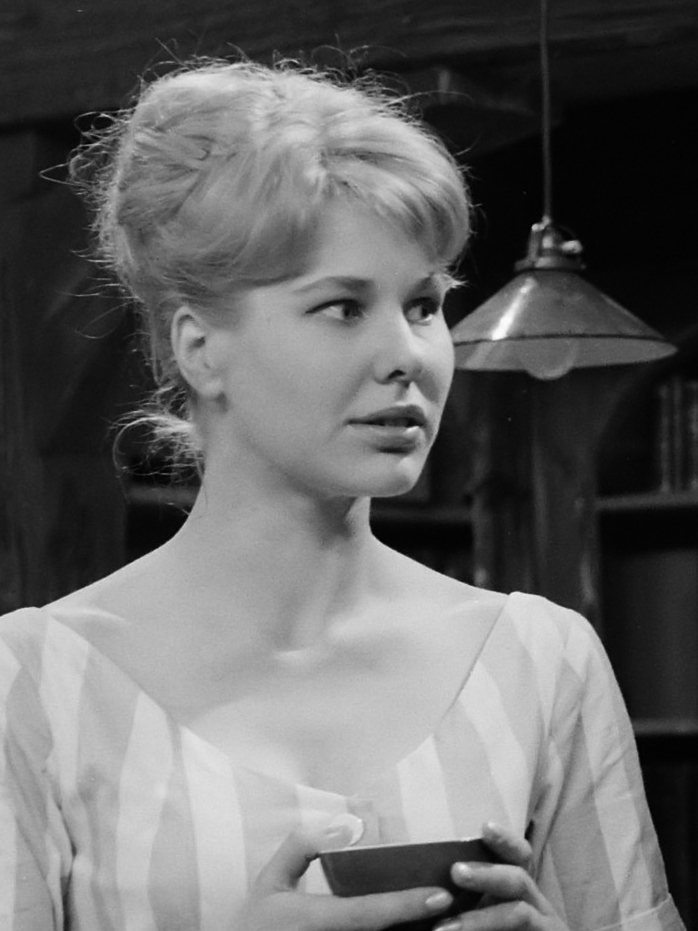
- Boersma in 1960
- Born: 11 December 1935; Amsterdam, Netherlands
- Died: 10 February 2026 (aged 90); Laren, Netherlands
- Years active: 1959–1990

Femke Boersma (11 December 1935 – 10 February 2026) was a Dutch actress.

== Life and career ==
Boersma was born in Amsterdam on 11 December 1935. She became known with a role in Het Wonderlijke leven van Willem Parel. In 1959 she had a leading role in the Holland Festival production Troilus and Cressida.

From 1958 to 1968 she was associated with the Nederlandse Comedie, where she played Honey in Wie is er bang voor Virginia Woolf, a production that sold out to hundreds of venues from 1964 to 1967. In 1968 she switched to Zuidelijk Toneel Globe, where she remained until 1980. In 1980 she founded Theater 80 together with Agaath Witteman and Marcelle Meuleman, among others, which became Theater Persona in 1984.

She was married to Dutch politician Frits Bolkestein from 1988 until his death in February 2025.

Boersma died in Laren on 10 February 2026, at the age of 90.
