= Tjeerd Bottema =

Dutch painter, illustrator, and book cover designer

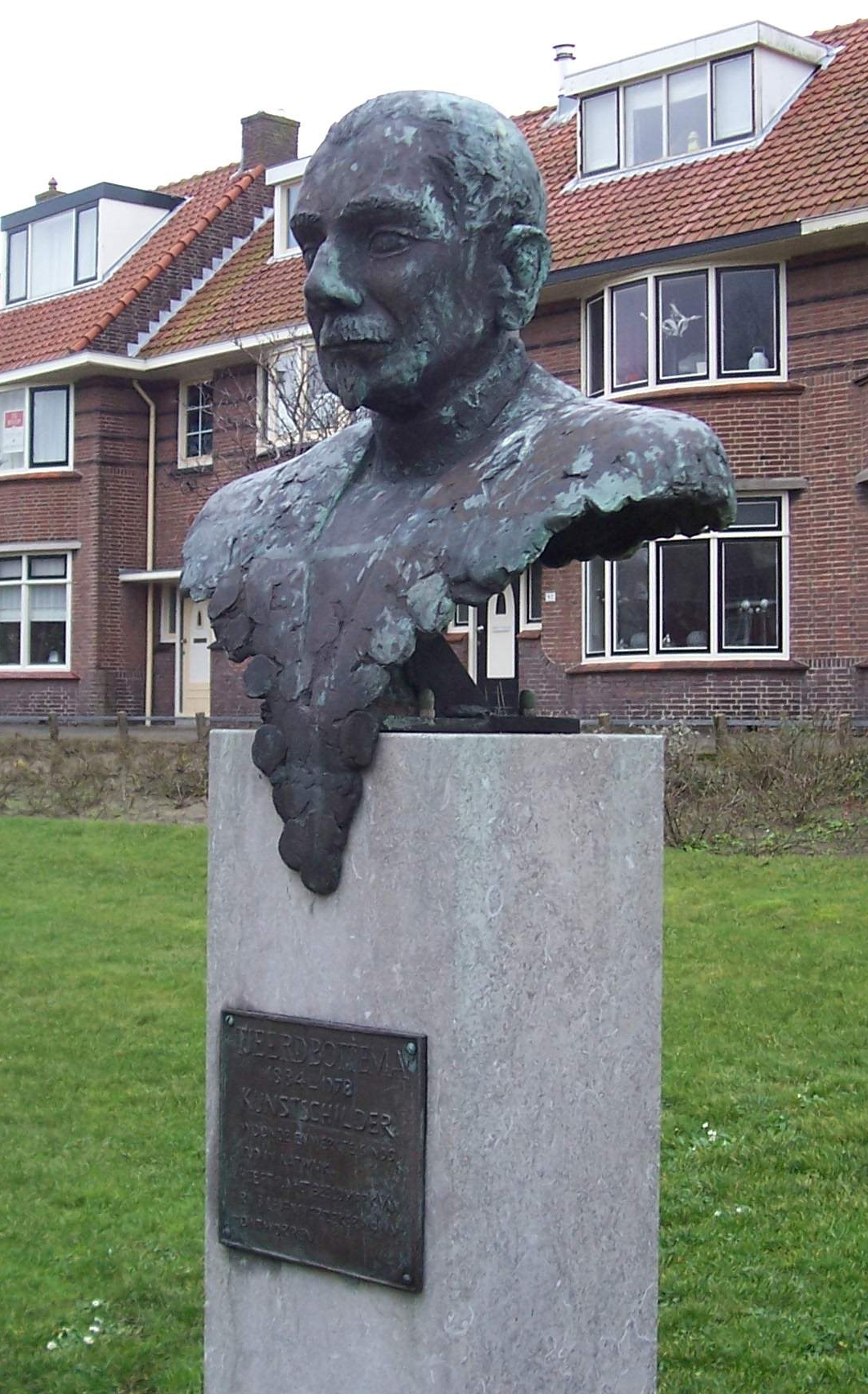
- Born: 6 February 1984
- Occupation: painter

Tjeerd (Tsjeard) Bottema (6 February 1884 in Langezwaag – 8 March 1978 in Katwijk) was a Dutch painter, illustrator and book cover designer.

== Biography ==
Bottema was a student at Kunstnijverheidsschool Quellinus and the Rijksakademie van beeldende kunsten in Amsterdam. He was a student of August Allebé, Antoon Derkinderen, George Sturm and Nicolaas van der Waay.

Winning the Dutch Prix de Rome in 1907 allowed him to make several trips to art including Italy, Spain, Morocco, France England and Belgium. After graduation he worked from 1911 to 1919 in Laren. Then he settled in Katwijk aan Zee, where he lived until his death in 1978.

Bottema was also a commercial artist and illustrator. As an illustrator he made the drawings for the novels of the Dutch Protestant writers Anne de Vries and W.G. van der Hulst, but he also made drawings for the socialist satiric magazine De Ware Jacob. A drawing made by him of a tramp inspired the Dutch writer John Henri uit den Bogaard to create the character Swiebertje.

Bottema illustrated the Dutch translation of The Wind in the Willows (De Avonturen van Mr. Mol)

== See also ==
- Tjerk Bottema
