= De Toverspiegel =

- Directed by: Willy van Hemert
- Written by: Willy van Hemert
- Release date: 2 October 1951
- Country: Netherlands
- Language: Dutch

De Toverspiegel is a 1951 Dutch film directed by Willy van Hemert.

== Cast ==
- Albert van Dalsum ... Professor Video
- Louis Bouwmeester ... Leerling
- Hetty Blok
- Johan De Meester
- Ad Hooykaas
- Ank van der Moer
