= Hetty Blok =

Dutch actress (1920–2012)

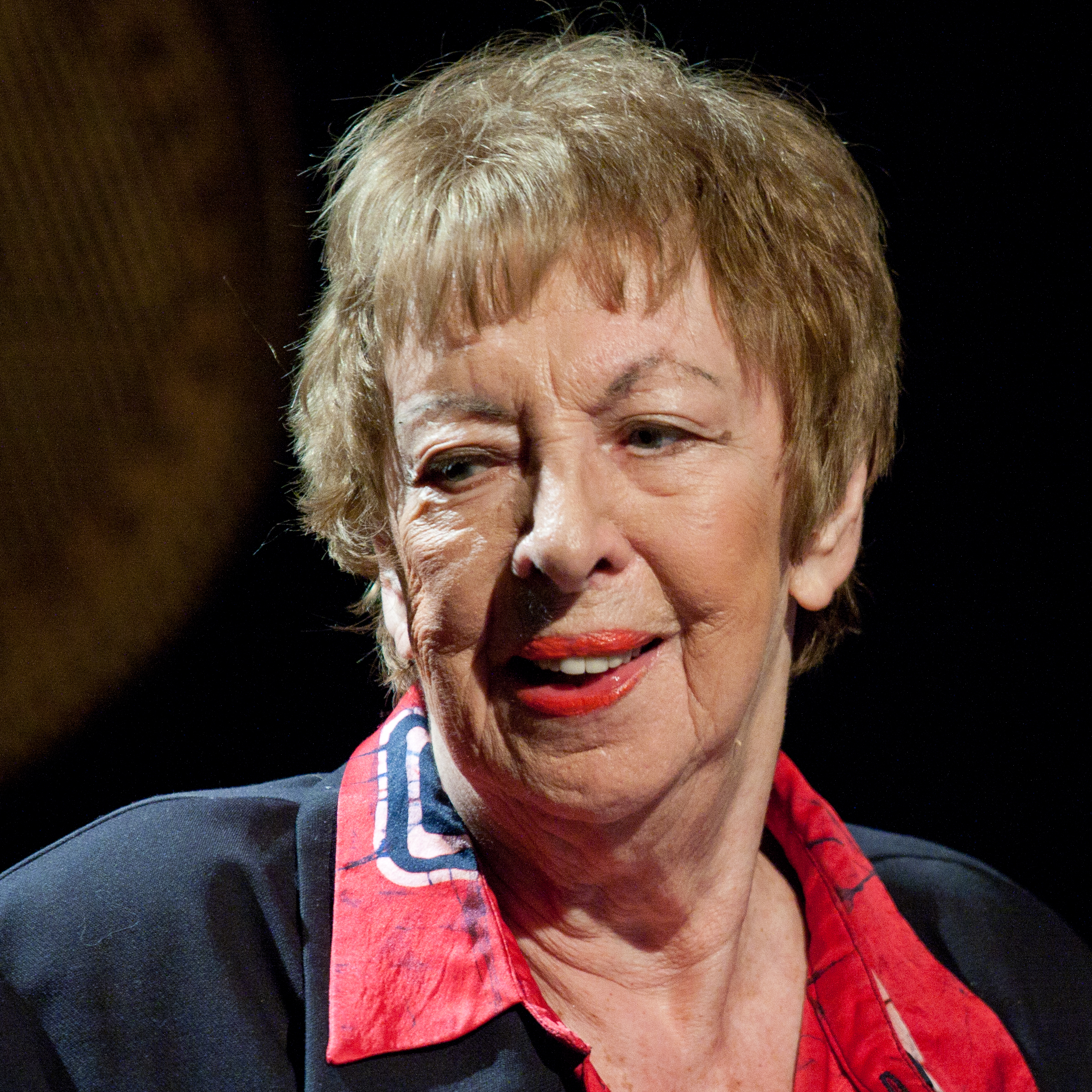
- Hetty Blok in 2011
- Born: Henriëtte Adriana Blok; 6 January 1920; Arnhem, Netherlands
- Died: 6 November 2012 (aged 92); Amsterdam, Netherlands
- Occupations: Actress comedian singer theatre director
- Years active: 1943–2011
- Notable work: Ja zuster, nee zuster

Henriëtte Adriana "Hetty" Blok (6 January 1920 – 6 November 2012) was a Dutch cabaret artist, singer, and actress who performed on the stage, on radio, and on television for more than five decades. Her best-known role is Nurse Klivia, one of the lead roles in the iconic television series Ja zuster, nee zuster, a role with which she was identified the rest of her life. She was known also as a friend of Annie M. G. Schmidt and a singer of her songs.

== Biography ==
Blok was born in Arnhem and made her stage début in 1943. Her career started shortly after World War II in cabaret, performing with established singers and musicians including Wim Sonneveld, Fien de la Mar, and Harry Bannink. She met Annie M. G. Schmidt during this time period and developed an intimate friendship with her. She sang and played in Sonneveld's 't is Historisch (1948), Wij spelen pantomime (1949), Iene miene mutte (1949), 't Is mij een raadsel (1950) and the Boekenbal program Een bloemlezing in prachtband (23 February 1951). On 2 October 1951, she was among the cast of Willy van Hemert's De toverspiegel, the first live program on Dutch television. She also did radio: from 1952 to 1958, she was the voice of the housemaid Sjaantje in Annie M. G. Schmidt's radio play In Holland staat een huis.

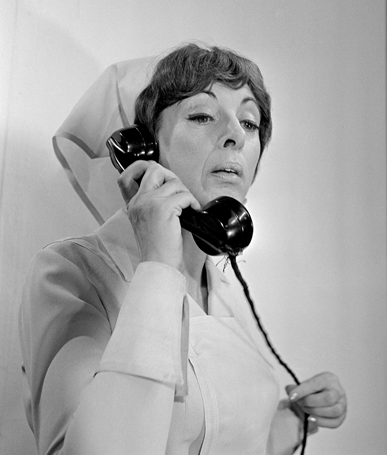
Nurse Klivia on set, 1966. Photograph by A. Vente.

Her most important role, with which she was identified her entire life, was as Nurse Klivia in Ja zuster, nee zuster, the television show by Annie M. G. Schmidt which ran from 1966 to 1968 and remains one of the most popular Dutch television shows ever. Besides acting in movies and television series, she spent a lot of time on stage, singing popular music accompanied by musicians such as Cor Lemaire, Harry Bannink, Ruud Bos, and Bas Odijk.

Blok remained active even in her old age; until 1998 she toured (accompanied by Bas Odijk) with a solo show, Ziezo, containing songs by Annie M. G. Schmidt. She had a cameo in the 2002 movie based on the original Ja zuster nee zuster. After retirement she appeared on radio shows and taught a generation of cabaret performers and singers, and made a guest appearance in January 2010 on De Wereld Draait Door, where she sang the theme song from Ja zuster, nee zuster, oft repeated afterward on Dutch television. In 2008 she performed during the Annie M. G. Schmidt week in the Openbare Bibliotheek Amsterdam, the same library where she celebrated her ninetieth birthday in 2010. She died, aged 92, in Amsterdam, after a brief illness.

== Filmography ==
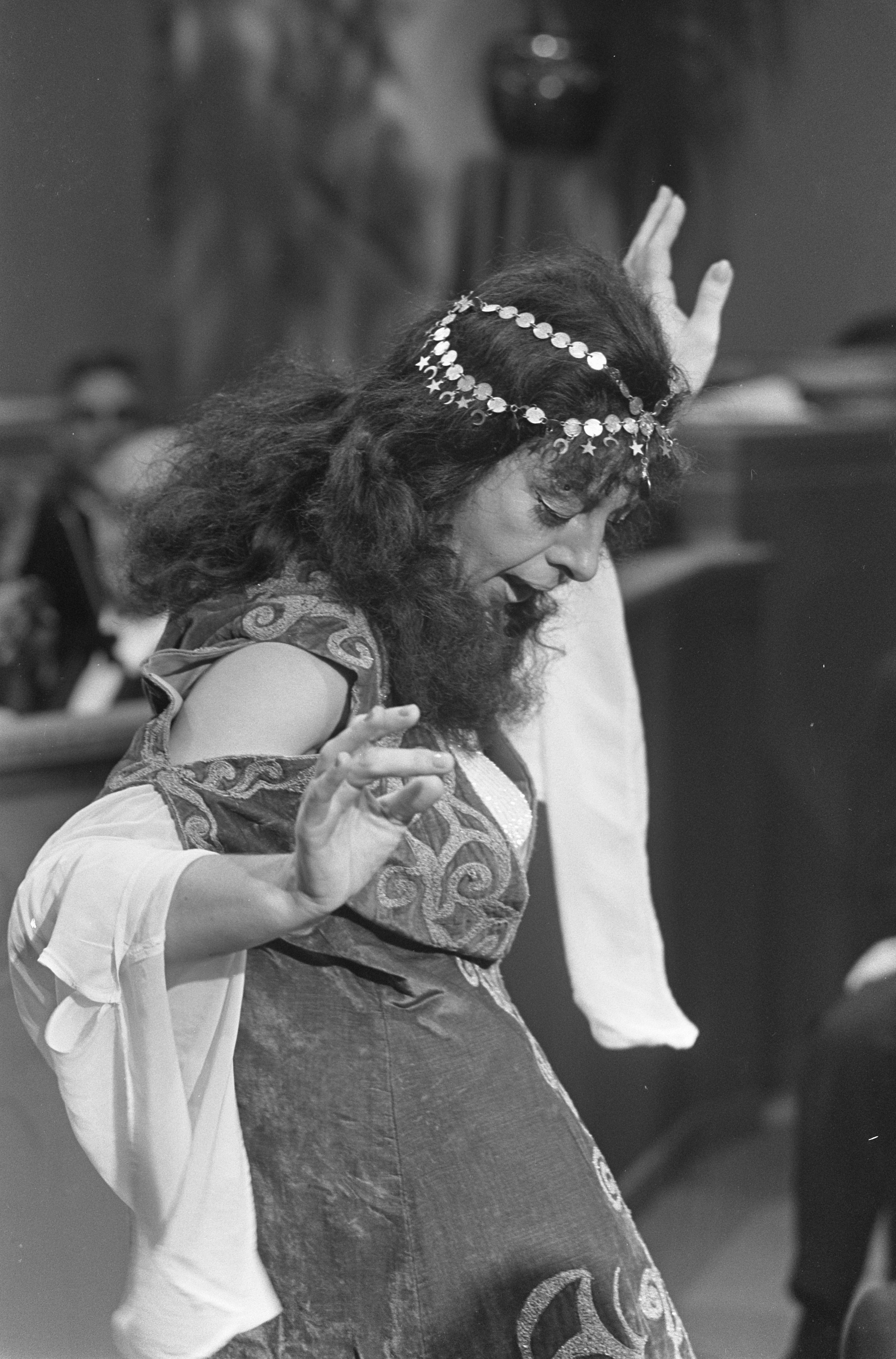
Blok playing a Turkish immigrant (1968)

- De Toverspiegel (1951, television)
- Sterren Stralen Overal (1953, movie)
- Kermis in de Regen (1962, movie)
- Ja zuster, nee zuster (1966–1968, television series) – nurse Klivia
- Kunt u mij de weg naar Hamelen vertellen, mijnheer? (1972, television series) – witch Eefje Eenoog
- Geen paniek (1973, movie) – aunt Toetje Kluif
- De nieuwe koning (1977, television movie) – queen
- Brandende liefde (1983, movie)
- Selma Vrooland (1993, television series)
- Zaanse nachten (1999, television show)
- Oppassen!!! (1999, television series) – oma van Piet van Vliet
- Ja Zuster, Nee Zuster (2002, movie) – cameo
