= Swiebertje =

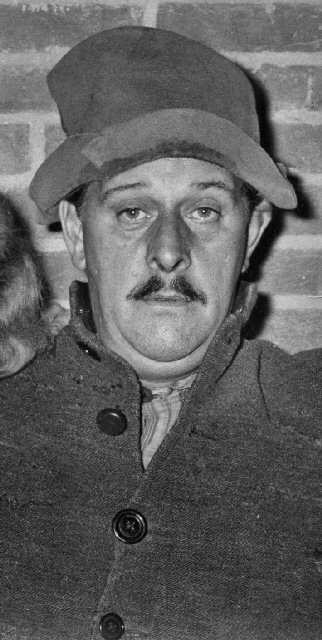
- First appearance: 1936
- Created by: John Henri uit den Bogaard
- Portrayed by: Joop Doderer

In-universe information
- Gender: Male
- Nationality: Dutch

Swiebertje is a character from the books of Dutch author John Henri uit den Bogaard, who wrote a series of children's books based on the character from 1936 to 1974. The books were adapted for television (Joop Doderer playing the title role), in a series of shows which aired on NCRV in the 1960s and 1970s, one of the longest-running and most popular shows in Dutch TV history.

== Character and adventures ==
The character Swiebertje is a tramp, and is supposed to be inspired by a drawing by Tjeerd Bottema. He is a "lovable vagabond", and his character as well as the TV show "present a comforting image of a simple rural past". His wanderings, during which he typically got in trouble but always found a happy ending, evoked romanticism and adventure. The "innocent" show was the second-most popular show among Dutch children in 1966; the most popular was the more adult program Bonanza.

Regular characters included, besides Swiebertje, the police officer Bromsnor (Lou Geels), housekeeper Saartje (Riek Schagen), and shopkeeper Malle Pietje (Piet Ekel). The vagabond 'Swiebertje' as well as the old-fashioned constable 'Bromsnor' and rag-and-bone man 'Malle Pietje' have grown to become household eponyms in the Dutch language.

== Joop Doderer ==
On TV, he was played by Joop Doderer, who became so identified with the part that the Dutch expression for the most extreme form of typecasting, where an actor is identified with just one single character, is called the Swiebertje-effect. Oudewater has a Swiebertje statue. Doderer played Swiebertje for seventeen years and grew to dislike the character. After the show had run its course, in 1975, he was unable to find serious roles because he was so much identified with Swiebertje; he left for England, where playing roles in high-quality television drama proved a relief. He returned to the Netherlands, and to the stage, and later made peace with the character, saying that Swiebertje derived its popularity from his everyman-qualities.

=== Adaptations ===
The TV series was adapted into a comic strip by Gerrit Stapel.
