= Conny Stuart =

Dutch actress and singer (1913–2010)

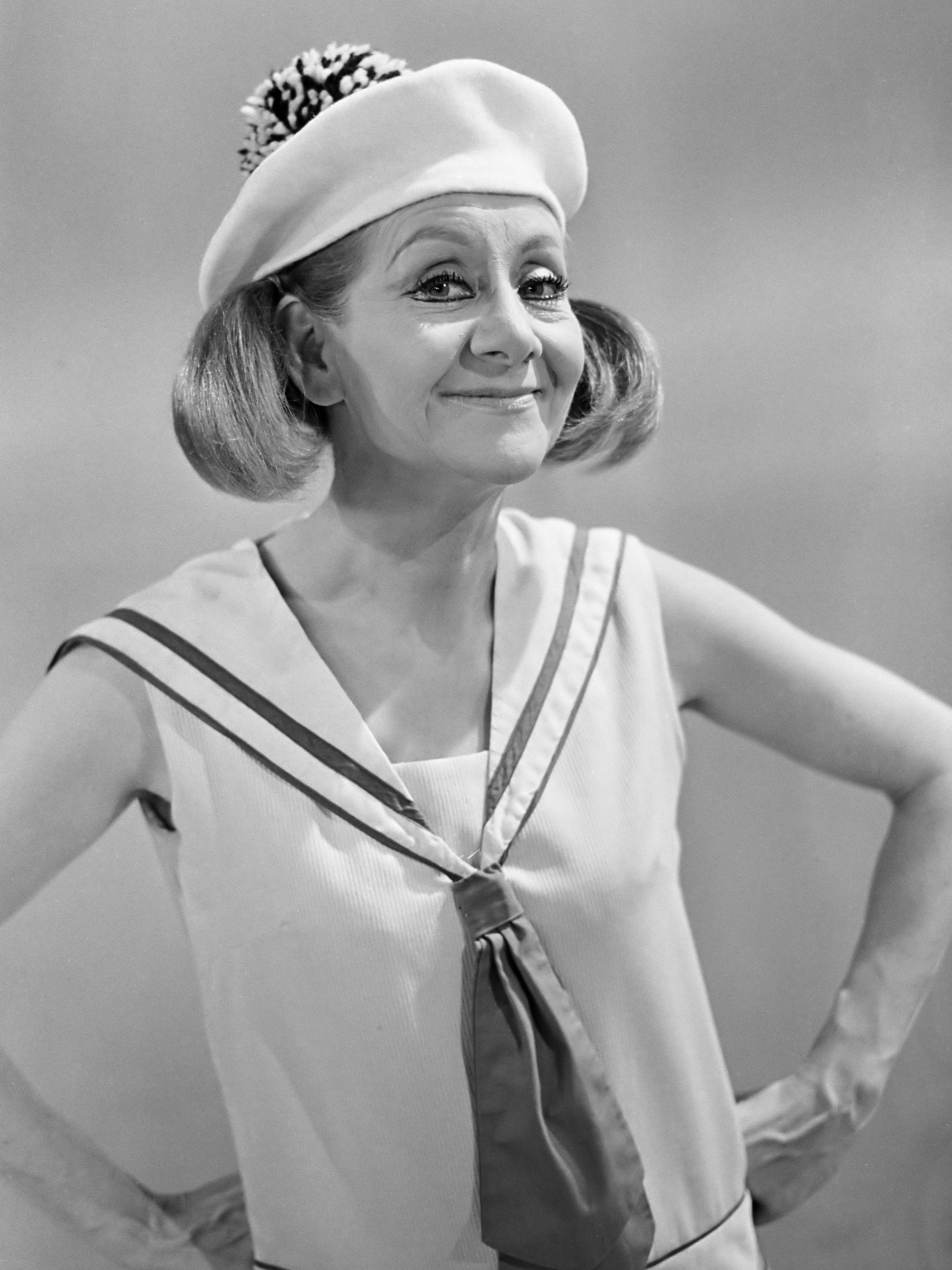
- Stuart in 1966
- Born: Cornelia van Meijgaard; Wijhe, Overijssel, Netherlands
- Occupations: Actress; singer; cabaretière
- Years active: 1930s–1985
- Spouses: Henri Hofman (div. 1957) Joop Doderer (m. 1957; div. 1960)
- Children: 2

Cornelia van Meijgaard (5 September 1913 – 22 August 2010), known professionally as Conny Stuart, was a Dutch actress, singer and cabaretière.

== Biography ==
Stuart was born in Wijhe and grew up in The Hague, near the Peace Palace. Her father, Pieter Hendrik van Meijgaard, was the administrator for the baron and senator Willem Lodewijk de Vos van Steenwijk.

During her education at the Hogere Burgerschool Bleyenburg, she took on the name "Stuart" and began piano lessons. In this period, she got the nickname "Puck". She started her career as a chansonnière and performed with the band of Freddy Johnson. On 25 July 1939, she made her radio debut.

Stuart at the Grand Gala du Disque, 1962

During World War II, Stuart met Wim Sonneveld and began to perform in his ensemble. Sonneveld stimulated her comic qualities, for instance by letting his stage writer, Hella Haasse, write a farcical song like "Yvonne de spionne" for her. In the 1950s, she became the leading lady of the show. Annie M.G. Schmidt, who wrote for such shows in those days, made sure Stuart had at least had one solo per show. She also could be heard in popular comical radio shows such as Mimosa and Koek en ei.

During this period, she was married to Henri Hofman and had two sons. But in 1957, she divorced and married fellow actor Joop Doderer; the two later divorced in 1960.

Starting in the 1960s, she became one of The Netherlands' greatest musical stars. From 1965, she mainly acted in the musicals of Annie M.G. Schmidt and Harry Bannink, including their first: Heerlijk duurt het langst. The show was an incredible success, and Schmidt and Bannink wrote four more musicals for her. She ended her career in 1985 with her stage show De Stuart Story, accompanied by Louis van Dijk, where she performed old success songs and new songs written for her by Schmidt.
