= German declaration of war on the Netherlands =

At 6:00 am (Amsterdam Time) on 10 May 1940, during the Battle of the Netherlands, the German envoy Count von Zech-Burkersroda gave the Dutch Minister of Foreign Affairs Van Kleffens a message. It was not an actual declaration of war. The message was later interpreted by the Dutch as a declaration of war; however from the German side it was at the time seen as a mere warning, hopefully intimidating the Dutch enough to accept German military protection. At the time of delivery, the German troops had already transgressed the Dutch border.

== The delivery ==
In the early hours of 10 May the German minister of foreign affairs Joachim von Ribbentrop ordered the German envoy in the Netherlands, Count Julius von Zech-Burkersroda, who had been living in the Netherlands for many years representing the German government, to deliver a message to the Dutch government. Around 04:00 local time the Dutch minister of foreign affairs Eelco van Kleffens was recalled from the Dutch war council to his department in order to receive the message. It was not easy for Van Kleffens to reach the building as The Hague was already under attack by German paratroopers and nervous Dutch soldiers manning checkpoints suspected anyone to be a fifth columnist. He was even arrested and released only on orders of the General Headquarters.

On arrival Van Kleffens received the envoy around 6:00 in his office, who entered, guarded by two Dutch officers, in tears. He had with him a transcription in German of the telegram. He should have reformulated it, but had been unable to, apparently having been overcome by his emotions, feeling deeply ashamed of the actions by his fellow countrymen. When facing Van Kleffens he was unable to speak but merely cried; after a while Van Kleffens asked him to hand over the paper so that he could read it himself.

It was directly apparent to Van Kleffens that the message entailed an offer to become a German protectorate (like Denmark had done a month earlier) under threat of complete annihilation of the Dutch state if the Dutch would refuse to comply. It would have to be made clear immediately that the Netherlands intended to continue the fight together with their allies; however, by the Dutch Constitution for a Dutch declaration of war, consent was needed of the States-General of the Netherlands. Therefore, he chose to answer that the Dutch government considered the Kingdom of the Netherlands to be already in a state of war with Germany as a result of the German military action. He answered by writing a reply with a blue aniline pencil on a small paper.

Many Dutch sources treat the telegram text as if it were a German declaration of war and change the typical style into standard sentences.

== In English ==
=== The telegram ===
Announcement of deployment of enormous German military force.

Any resistance completely futile

Germany guarantees European and extra-European possessions and the dynasty, if any resistance remains absent. Else danger of complete annihilation of the country and the form of government.

Therefore demand urgently appeal people and forces and demand establish contact with German military commanders

Motivation: we have irrefutable proof of an imminent threat of invasion by France and England in Belgium, the Netherlands, Luxembourg, which has long been prepared with the joint knowledge of the Netherlands and Belgium. Purpose: advance to Ruhr area

=== Telegram changed into a German declaration ===
We announce to you the deployment of an enormous German military force. Any resistance is perfectly futile. Germany guarantees the territorial integrity in Europe and Overseas, as well as the dynasty, if any resistance remains absent. If not, then a danger exists of complete annihilation of the country and its form of government. Therefore we admonish you urgently to make an appeal to the people and the military forces and furthermore to establish a line of communication with the German military commanders. Motivation: We have irrefutable proof of an imminent threat of invasion by France and England in Belgium, the Netherlands and Luxembourg, which had long been prepared with the joint knowledge of the Netherlands and Belgium, with the purpose of attacking the Ruhr area.

=== Dutch reply ===
With indignation Her Majesty's Government rejects the allegation by the German Government, that it, in any way, or with any other Power, has made secret agreements directed against Germany. In view of the outrageous German attack on the Netherlands, an attack initiated without any prior warning, it is the judgement of the Dutch Government that presently a state of war has come to exist between the Kingdom and Germany.

== In Dutch ==
=== Telegram ===
Mededeling doen van inzetten van geweldige Duitse troepenmacht.

Elk verzet volledig zinloos

Duitsland garandeert Europese en buiten-Europese bezittingen en de dynastie, indien elk verzet achterwege blijft. Anders gevaar van volledige vernietiging van het land en het staatsbestel

Daarom dringend eisen oproep volk en strijdkrachten en eisen opnemen contact met Duitse militaire commandanten.

Motivering: wij hebben onweerlegbare bewijzen van een onmiddellijk dreigende inval van Frankrijk en Engeland in België, Nederland, Luxemburg, die met medeweten van Nederland en België sinds lang is voorbereid. Doel: oprukken naar Roergebied.

=== Rewrite as declaration (in Dutch) ===
Wij kondigen U den inzet van een geweldige Duitsche troepenmacht aan. Elke tegenstand is volmaakt doelloos. Duitschland garandeert den staat van bezit in Europa en overzee, zoowel als de dynastie, indien elke tegenstand uitblijft. Zoo niet, dan bestaat er gevaar voor een volledige vernietiging van het land en zijn staatsbestel. Daarom manen wij U dringend aan, tot het volk en de weermacht een oproep te richten en voorts in verbinding te treden met Duitsche militaire commando's. Motiveering: wij hebben onweerlegbare bewijzen voor een onmiddellijk dreigenden inval van Frankrijk en Engeland in België, Nederland en Luxemburg, die met medeweten van Nederland en België sinds lang was voorbereid, met het doel op het Roergebied een aanval te doen.

=== Dutch reply ===
Met verontwaardiging wijst Harer Majesteits Regeering de aantijging der Duitsche Regeering van de hand, dat zij, op eenige wijze, of met eenige mogendheid, geheime en tegen Duitschland gerichte afspraken heeft gemaakt. Gezien den ongehoorden Duitschen aanval op Nederland, een aanval begonnen zonder eenige voorafgaande waarschuwing, is de Nederlandsche Regeering van oordeel, dat thans een staat van oorlog is ontstaan tusschen het Koninkrijk en Duitschland.
