= List of Dutch films of the 1950s =

This is a list of films produced in the Netherlands during the 1950s. The films are produced in the Dutch language.

Title	Year	Director	Cast	Genre	Notes
1950
De Dijk is Dicht	1950	Anton Koolhaas	Kees Brusse, Henny Alma	Drama	
Myrte of the Demons		Paul Bruno Schreiber - Camera Bert Haanstra	Ludzer Eringa - Jan Musch - Theo Van Vliet - Marie Jeanne van der Veen - Paulida Weggelaar-Schreiber	Fantasy	YouTube. please search for it with the Dutch title: Myrte en de demonen. Note: first Dutch fantasy movie after WWII.
Mirror of Holland		Bert Haanstra		Short documentary	Won the Short Film Palme d'Or at the 1951 Cannes Film Festival
1951
De Toverspiegel	1951	Willy van Hemert			
Kees, de zoon van de Stroper		Ernst Winar	Sjoerd van Driel		
1952
Kampeeravonturen	1952	Henk van der Linden			

Title	Year	Director	Cast	Genre	Notes
1953
Rechter Thomas	1953	Walter Smith	Piet Bron, Ton van Duinhoven	Drama	
Sterren Stralen Overal		Gerard Rutten	Johan Kaart, Kitty Janssen	Drama	
Houen zo!				Documentaire	
1955
Ciske de Rat	1955	Wolfgang Staudte	Kees Brusse	Jeugd; Drama	
Het Wonderlijke leven van Willem Parel		Gerard Rutten	Wim Sonneveld	Komedie	
Sjors van de Rebellenclub		Henk van der Linden			
Vier Jongens en een Jeep		Ernst Winar	Silvain Poons	Jeugdfilm; Avontuur	
1957
Kleren Maken de Man	1957		Kees Brusse		
Trouwe Kameraden					
De Vliegende Hollander			Ton Kuyl; Coen Flink	Biografische film	
1958
Fanfare	1958	Bert Haanstra	Johan Kaart		Entered into the 1959 Cannes Film Festival and the 1st Moscow International Film Festival
The Village on the River		Fons Rademakers	Max Croiset		Nominated for an Academy Award and entered into the Berlin Film Festival
Glass		Bert Haanstra		Documentaire	
Jenny		Willy van Hemert	Ellen van Hemert	Drama	First Dutch color film
1959
Het Geheim van de Oude Molen	1959				
Moutarde van Sonansee		Toon Hermans	Toon Hermans	Komedie	
