= List of Dutch films of the 1960s =

This is a list of films produced in the Netherlands during the 1960s. The films are produced in the Dutch language.

Title	Year	Director	Cast	Genre	Notes
1960
Faja Lobbi	1960	Herman van der Horst		Documentaire	
De Nieuwe Avonturen van Dik Trom		Henk van der Linden	Sjefke Nievelstein; Rinus Bonekamp	Jeugdfilm	Langstlopende film ooit in Nederland (1958–1987)
Avonturen van een Zigeunerjongen		Henk van der Linden	Louk Perry; Cor van der Linden	Jeugdfilm	
Stranding		Louis van Gasteren	Josephine van Gasteren; Lex Goudsmit	Drama; Misdaad	
Makkers Staakt uw Wild Geraas		Fons Rademakers	Ellen Vogel; Guus Oster	Drama	Won the Silver Bear at Berlin
De Zaak M.P.		Bert Haansta	Albert Mol	Komedie	

Title	Year	Director	Cast	Genre	Notes
1961
De Laatste Passagier	1961	Jef van der Heyden	Rob de Vries; Edwin de Vries	Jeugdfilm	
Pygmalion					
Het Mes		Fons Rademakers	Ellen Vogel; Guus Hermus	Jeugddrama	Entered into the 1961 Cannes Film Festival
Het Verraad van de Zwarte Roofridder		Henk van der Linden	Louk Perry; Cor van der Linden	Jeugdfilm	
1962
Rififi in Amsterdam	1962	Giovanni Korporaal	Maxim Hamel; Johan Kaart	Komedie; Misdaad	
Kermis in de Regen		Kees Brusse	Kees Brusse; Mieke Verstraete	Misdaad; Drama	
De Overval		Paul Rotha	Kees Brusse; Rob de Vries	Oorlog; Misdaad	Entered into the 3rd Moscow International Film Festival
Pan				Documentaire	
Het Wonder van Licht				Documentaire	
1963
Alleman	1963	Bert Haanstra		Documentaire	
Fietsen naar de Maan		Jef van der Heyden	Ton Lensink; Bernard Droog	Komedie	
Als twee druppels water		Fons Rademakers	Lex Schoorel; Mia Goossen	Oorlog; Drama	Entered into the 1963 Cannes Film Festival
De Vergeten Medeminnaar		Giovanni Korporaal	Henk Ulsen; Hetty Verhoogt	Drama	
1964
De Avonturen van Pietje Bell	1964	Henk van der Linden	Jeu Consten; Cor van der Linden	Jeugdfilm	
Plantage Tamarinde		Michael Forlong	Albert van Dalsum; Jack Monkau	Drama	De film is opgenomen op Curaçao
Mensen van Morgen		Kees Brusse		Docufilm	
Blind kind		Johan van der Keuken		Documentaire	
1965
Op de Bodem van de Hemel	1965	Jan Vrijman		Documentaire	
Vrijbuiters van het Woud		Henk van der Linden		Jeugdfilm	
1966
10:32	1966	Arthur Dreifuss	Linda Christian; Bob de Lange	Drama; Misdaad	
Sjors en Sjimmie en de Gorilla		Henk van der Linden	Jeu Consten; Jos van der Linden	Jeugdfilm	
De Dans van de Reiger		Fons Rademakers	Gunnel Lindblom; Jean Dessaily	Drama	Opgenomen in Joegoslavië
De minder gelukkige terugkeer van Jozef Katus naar het land van Rembrandt		Wim Verstappen	Rudolf Lucieer	Drama	
Het Gangstermeisje		Frans Weisz	Paolo Grazioso; Kitty Courbois	Drama	Entered into the 17th Berlin International Film Festival
Een Ochtend van Zes Weken		Nikolai van der Heyden	Hans Culeman; Anne Colette	Drama	
Het Afscheid		Roland Verhavert	Petra Lasseur; Julien Schoenearts	Drama	
Een ochtend van zes weken					
1967
Liefdes Bekentenissen	1967	Wim Verstappen	Ramses Shaffy; Kitty Courbois	Drama; Romantiek	
ik kom wat later naar Madra		Adriaan Ditvoorst	Hans Oosterhuis	Drama	
De Verloedering van de Swieps		Erik Terpstra	Wies Andersen; Ramses Shaffy	Komedie	
Een Vreemde Vogel		Lennart Nijgh	Thijs Volkert; Ramses Shaffy	Drama	
Ongewijde Aarde		Jef van der Heyden	Ton Lensink; Shireen Strooker	Drama	
Paranoia		Adriaan Ditvoorst			Entered into the 17th Berlin International Film Festival
1968
To Grab the Ring		Nikolai van der Heyde			Entered into the 18th Berlin International Film Festival
Del Negro; Fons Rademakers	Oorlog; Drama				
Professor Columbus		Rainer Erler	Rudolf Platte; Jeroen Krabbe	Komedie	West German-Dutch co-production
The Compromise (Het Compromis)		Philo Bregstein	Gerben Hellinga; Marline Fritzius	Drama	
Rondom het Oudekerksplein		Roeland Kerbosch		Documentaire	
1969
Bezeten, Het Gat in de Muur	1969	Pim de la Parra	Alexandra Stewart, Dieter Geissler; Tom van Beek; Donald Jones	Drama	Dutch-West German co-production
De Blanke Slavin		Rene Daalder	Gunther Ungeheuer; Andrea Domburg	Drama	
Antenna		Adrian Ditvoorst		Komedie; Drama	
Drop-out		Wim Verstappen		Drama; Jeugd	
Twee Jongens en een Oude Auto		Henk van der Linden	Jeu Consten; Cor van der Linden	Jeugdfilm	
Toccata					
Monsieur Hawarden		Harry Kümel			
