= Truus Dekker =

Dutch actress (1922–2022)

- Born: Geertruida Anna Dekker; 13 May 1922; Wormerveer, Netherlands
- Died: 8 January 2022 (aged 99); Amsterdam, Netherlands
- Occupation: Actress

Geertruida Anna "Truus" Dekker (13 May 1922 – 8 January 2022) was a Dutch actress.

== Biography ==
She died in Amsterdam on 8 January 2022, at the age of 99. Dekkers graduated from the Academy of Theatre and Dance in 1946, and first became known for her acting in television series by Wim T. Schippers. She acted in Dutch films like Turkish Delight, Soldier of Orange and Spetters. Her last performance was in Dokter Tinus in 2013.

== Filmography ==
Year	Title	Role	Notes
1963	Memorandum van een dokter	Lizzy Malcolm	Episode: "Medische ethiek"
1964	Rats en Repel en Lollipop!	juffrouw Lila	12 episodes
1971	Business Is Business	Lady in Lunchroom	
1972	The Little Ark	Mother Grijpma	
1973	Turkish Delight	Serveerster	
1975	Keetje Tippel		Uncredited
1976	Barocco	L'employée	
1977	Doctor Vlimmen	Moeder Overste	
1977	Soldier of Orange	Mrs. Lanshof	
1978	De Mantel der Liefde	Vrouw in kroeg	
1978	Pastorale 1943	Dame bij drogist	Uncredited
1978	Het is weer zo laat!	Nieuwe huiseigenaar - Verdwaalde vrouw	2 episodes
1979	A Woman Like Eve	Mom	
1979	Andy, bloed en blond haar	Ella's mother	
1980	Spetters		
1981	The Girl with the Red Hair	Grijze Muis	
1984	Gebroken spiegels	Buurvrouw uit raam	
1984	Opzoek naar Yolanda	Loes de Wilde	5 episodes
1986	Plafond over de vloer	Loes de Wilde	25 episodes
1987	Bygones	Moeder overste	
1989-1994	We zijn weer thuis	Nel van der Hoed-Smulders	47 episodes
1995	Toen Was Geluk Heel Gewoon	Moeder Kooijman	Episode: "Ha die ma"
1995	Baantjer	Mevrouw Wientjes	Episode: "De Cock en de moord op de oude dame"
1996	Het sluitend bewijs		
2004	In Orange	Mevrouw Swinkels	
2007	Wolfsbergen	Winkeldame	
2010	Flikken Maastricht	Kaartende vrouw	
