= Ellen Jens =

Dutch television director and producer (1940–2023)

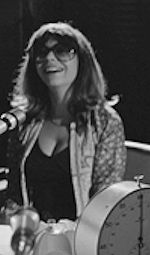
Jens in 1974

Ellen Jens (6 October 1940 – 17 November 2023) was a Dutch television director and producer, best known for her collaboration with Wim T. Schippers on VPRO television. She produced and directed a large number of other television shows, especially on literature and art, and was referred to as a "television legend".

== Early life and career ==
Ellen Jens was born in Wassenaar on 6 October 1940. In the early 1970s Jens was a "scriptgirl" working for the VPRO. Starting in 1972 she began working with Wim T. Schippers, producing his shows from 1972 (De Fred Hachéshow) to 1994 (We zijn weer thuis); on many of the shows she is credited as a director and writer as well.

Jens produced and directed Hier is Adriaan van Dis, the talk show hosted by Adriaan van Dis (which ran from 1983 to 1992), and was the producer of the long-running VPRO TV show Jiskefet and the Schippers series on popular science Flogiston. For presenter Hanneke Groenteman, she produced the talk show on art De Plantage, from 1994 to 2001. From 2005 onwards she produced the TV show VPRO Boeken, a program on literature hosted by Wim Brands, for which she also designed the set (modeled on the set for De Plantage, taped in the Studio Plantage in Artis, in turn modeled on her own house); she was picked (as a "television legend") for her experience with literature, based in part on her work with Adriaan van Dis.

== Personal life ==
In the early 1970s she dated Hugo Claus, at the time when he promoted his novel Het jaar van de kreeft; Claus and Jens were photographed together as part of a campaign to promote the book, which had Claus's love life as its main topic. She lived with Wim T. Schippers in the 1970s and 1980s and later married him.

Jens died in Amsterdam on 17 November 2023, at the age of 83.

== Select filmography ==
Entries marked with an asterisk are with Wim T. Schippers

- Zomergasten
- Flogiston*
- We zijn weer thuis* (47 episodes, 1989–1994)
- De bruine jurk* (TV play, 1988)
- Sans Rancune* (TV play, 1987)
- Going to the Dogs* (TV production, 1986)
- Plafond over de vloer* (9 episodes, 1986)
- Opzoek naar Yolanda* (6 episodes, 1984)
- De lachende scheerkwast* (12 episodes, 1981–1982)
- Ramp Ahead* (TV movie, 1980)
- De dans der vierkanten waarin opgenomen Elly, of het beroemde stuk* (TV production of Holland Festival opening, 1980)
- VerhagenCadabra (5 episodes, 1979)
- Het is weer zo laat!* (10 episodes, 1978)
- Cross Now* (1977)
- Ninette de Valois (mag ik mijn grijze mapje terug)* (1976)
- Grote Genade* (1976)
- Echo's uit het alpendal* (1976)
- De ondergang van de Onan* (1976)
- Volk en vaderliefde* (1975)
- Het grote gebeuren (1975)
- Van Oekel's Discohoek* (1974)
- Barend is weer bezig* (5 episodes, 1972–1973)
- De Fred Haché Show* (1972)
