= De lachende scheerkwast =

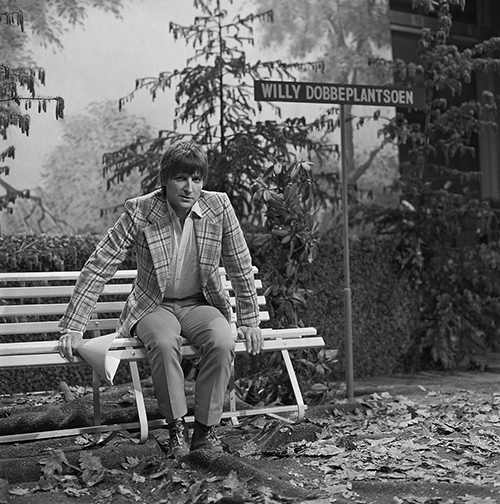
- Jacques Plafond in the Willy Dobbeplantsoen
- Country of origin: Netherlands
- Original language: Dutch
- No. of seasons: 1
- No. of episodes: 6

Original release
- Network: VPRO

De lachende scheerkwast ("The laughing shave brush") is a Dutch television show written and directed by Wim T. Schippers, who also plays one of the lead characters, Jacques Plafond. It ran on VPRO television for six episodes in 1981 before being canceled, and then returned for another six episodes.

== Content ==
The show's plot was intentionally unclear, though one plot line involved the head of a "school with the bible", Rein Schaambergen, whose marriage is threatened when he meets singer Ingrid Gortebroek in the bar "The Old Dick" and decides to produce a record for her. De lachende scheerkwast turned out to be a play written by writer Jacques Plafond (played by Schippers), and the show itself was a chaotic affair ("anarchist...always derailing") with more emphasis on absurdist, comical scenes and linguistic jokery than on story development. It was a prequel of sorts to Schippers' later radio show Ronflonflon (1984-1991) and his television shows Opzoek naar Yolanda (1984), Plafond over de vloer (1986), and We zijn weer thuis (1989-1994).

The cast likewise returned in many Schippers productions, and included jazz musician Clous van Mechelen (as Jan Vos).

== Cast ==
- Lex de Regt - Rein Schaambergen
- Mies de Heer - Ria Schaambergen-Rotsak
- Zillah Emanuels - Ingrid Gortebroek
- Dolf Brouwers - Sjef van Oekel
- Mimi Kok - Gé Braadslee
- Clous van Mechelen - Jan Vos
- Rob van Houten - Boy Bensdorp
- Wim T. Schippers -Jacques Plafond
- Dick van den Toorn - Otto Drissen
- Janine van Elzakker - Elsje de Wit

== Legacy ==
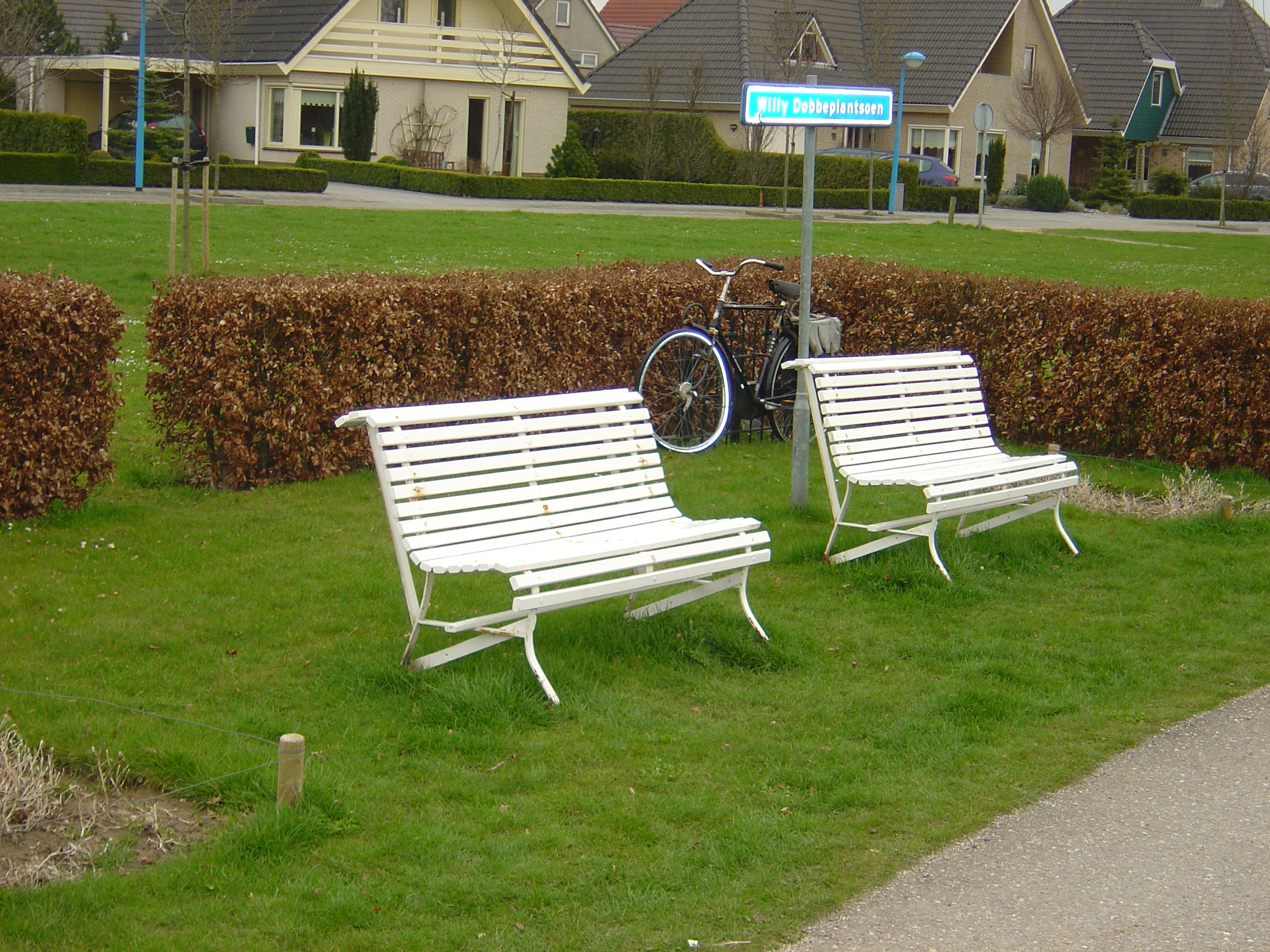
Willy Dobbeplantsoen, Olst

The show is praised for its influence on Dutch language and culture; many of its catchphrases and buzzwords found their way into the language and some of its fictional locations became real. The Dutch village Olst, for instance, named one of its parks for the show's Willy Dobbeplantsoen; Willy Dobbe, a Dutch TV announcer for the TROS broadcaster, stood for the petty bourgeois mentality the show made fun of. Dobbe herself was the guest of honor at the park's ten-year anniversary, which was attended by Schippers alumni such as Dolf Brouwers (Sjef van Oekel), Clous van Mechelen (Jan Vos), and Rob van Houten (Boy Bensdorp). At the occasion, Olst's mayor, Tom Strien, indicated how controversial the show was since he was forbidden by his parents to watch it.

== DVD release ==
The series was released on DVD in 2008 as volume 8 of Wim T. Schippers' Televisiepraktijken - sinds 1962.
