= Clous van Mechelen =

Dutch musician, arranger, and actor

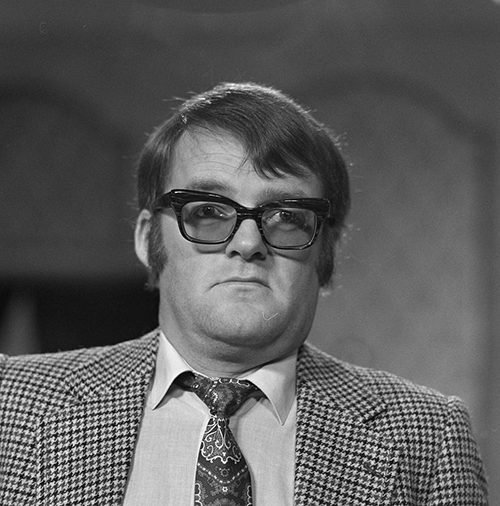
Clous van Mechelen as Jan Vos in De lachende scheerkwast (1981)

Clous van Mechelen (born Jacob Philip (Jack) van Mechelen; 12 March 1941 in Amsterdam) is a Dutch musician, arranger, and actor. Van Mechelen scored a minor hit in 1969 with his band The Butlers, and became widely known through the radio and television shows written and directed by Wim T. Schippers (he is referred to as his "house composer"), in which he played the character Jan Vos and wrote songs for the various characters (including Barend Servet and Sjef van Oekel).

== Biography ==
Van Mechelen has been playing jazz since the 1950s; Hans Dulfer played in his band. He collaborated with a number of writers and artists associated with the Amsterdam daily newspaper Het Parool in the cabaret show De Inktvis, including Annie M. G. Schmidt. He had considerable success writing music for commercials, notably for the Grolsch Brewery (the "baroque music" for the "Vakmanschap is Meesterschap" commercials), for Nationale Nederlanden, and for chicken.

He wrote for the film (with Theo van Gogh), and recorded with Tol Hansse, for whom he wrote the music for his greatest hit, "Big City" (earlier, Hansse and van Mechelen were members of a rock band, The Sharks). With his band, Het Nieuwe Trio, he plays 1950s/1960s style music.

With Schippers (Ernie) and Paul Haenen (Bert) he recorded music for a number of Bert and Ernie albums, and for Haenen's character Margreet Dolman. In Opzoek naar Yolanda (1984) he is the musician and producer for the (fictional) hit song "Smoke, Gammon and Spinach", and "Ik ben Jan Vos" ("I am Jan Vos") is a song penned by (fictional) Jacques Plafond-penned in his honor.

Van Mechelen's first on-screen performance in a Schippers show was in Barend is weer bezig, in the 1974 Christmas special Waar heb dat nou weer voor nodig. He also appeared in De lachende scheerkwast (1981–1982), Opzoek naar Yolanda (1984), Plafond over de vloer (1986), and We zijn weer thuis (1989–1994), shows for which he also was the composer and musical director. He appeared on stage in 1992 in a musical comedy, Tataboulou/In volle vaart, with Neel van der Elst, who played Etna Vesuvia in the Schippers radio show Ronflonflon, and in 1995 in Alleen (met z'n vieren).
