= Mimi Kok =

Dutch actress (1934–2014)

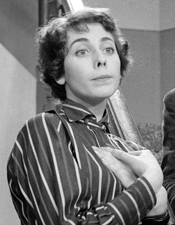
- Mimi Kok in Pension Hommeles (1958)
- Born: Maria Christina Mimi Kok; 25 January 1934; Amsterdam, Netherlands
- Died: 19 April 2014 (aged 80)
- Occupation: Actress

Maria Christina "Mimi" Kok (25 January 1934 – 19 April 2014) was a Dutch film and television actress.

== Biography ==
Kok was discovered by Toon Hermans after winning a beauty pageant in Zandvoort in 1951. He hired her to perform with his theater show. At the end of the 1950s she tried her luck in the United States in the musical business, but her attempt was unsuccessful and returned to the Netherlands in a state of depression.

She returned to work with Toon Hermans again, after which her career on stage and in film and television took off. She played both comic and more serious roles in more than 30 productions. She was a regular on the television shows of Wim T. Schippers, playing the "full-breasted" character Gé Braadslee on Het is weer zo laat!, probably her best-known role.

In 2012 she appeared in a reality TV show, Krasse Knarren, with four other elderly famous people. Later in life she suffered from loneliness and depression, volunteering at a telephone helpline to combat her own loneliness and to help others.

Her last role was on a boat during the Amsterdam Gay Pride boat parade in 2013. In January 2014 she was hospitalized with pneumonia.

Mimi Kok died on 19 April 2014 from lung disease.

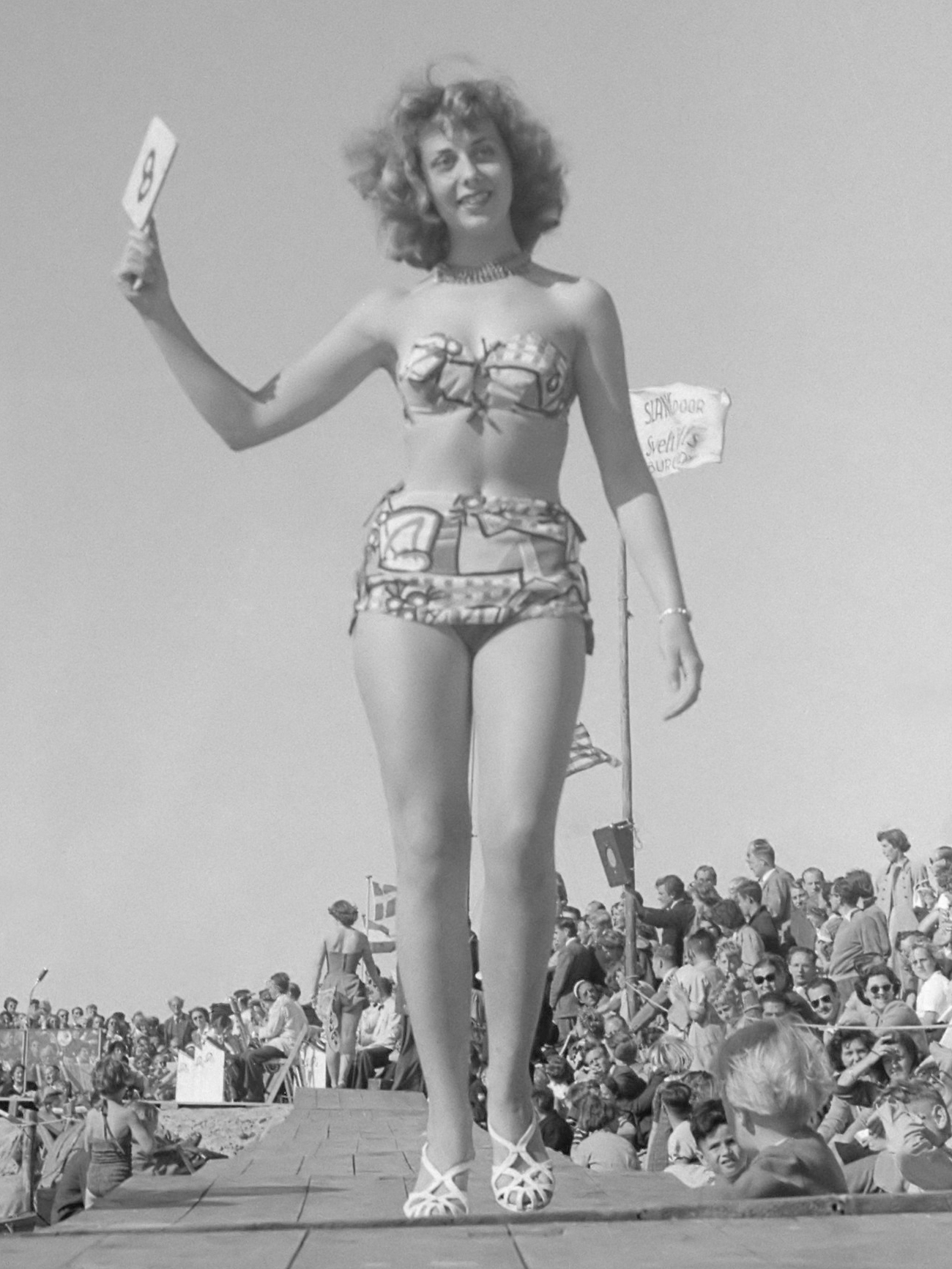
Mimi Kok in 1951, at the Miss Zandvoort pageant

== Filmography ==
=== Film ===
- Paranoia (1967)
- Blue Movie (1971)
- Frank en Eva (1973)
- Red Sien (1975)
- Han de Wit (1990)
- Filmpje! (1995)
- Schoon Goed (1999)
- Terrorama (2001)
- Van Speijk (2007)

=== Television ===
- Pension Hommeles (1957-1959)
- Kunt u mij de weg naar Hamelen vertellen mijnheer (4th season, 1975)
- Het is weer zo laat! (1978)
- De Fabriek (1981)
- De lachende scheerkwast (1981-1982, as Gé Braadslee)
- Opzoek naar Yolanda (1984, as Gé Braadslee)
- Plafond over de vloer (1986, as Myra Swift-Balkema)
- We zijn weer thuis (1993, as Mathilde van Setten-van der Kaap)

== Theatre ==
- En toen kwam dokter Frost (1957-1958)
