= Dik Trom en zijn dorpsgenoten =

1947 film

- Directed by: Ernst Winar
- Written by: Ernst Winar
- Cinematography: Emiel van Moerkerken
- Release date: 9 December 1947
- Running time: 60 minutes
- Country: Netherlands
- Language: Dutch

Dik Trom en zijn dorpsgenoten ("Rascal Dik Trom gathers money for a poor and sick acquaintance") is a 1947 Dutch film directed by Ernst Winar. The film was based on the popular children's book series Dik Trom by Cornelis Johannes Kieviet.

== Plot ==
In a small grocery shop, Kee tries to buy beans, but the shopkeeper (Mrs. Boon) refuses to sell them to her because Kee owes her money. Kee mentions that her husband is sick and is not able to make a living, but the shopkeeper still refuses. At home, Dik asks his mother for food to give to Kee and her husband. His mother agrees and prepares a basket with some food. Willem, Kee's husband, is ill and lying in bed. Right after Kee gave Willem some water and bread, Dik arrives with the basket, containing eggs, coffee and meat, which Kee gratefully accepts.

After that, Dik goes to a dovecote with his two friends, Jan and Pieter. After Dik performs a magic trick, one of his friends tells the others that Mrs. Smul and a few other women are planning to gather at Mr. Mulder's house that night and to expel Kee, the so-called witch, from town. Dik proposes to gather behind Mr. Mulder's house that night to scare the women off. That night, Dik and his friends put on the white sheets and, dressed up as ghosts, scare the superstitious women out of Mr. Mulder's house, while Mr. Mulder himself hides under a bed. Dik and his friends find him and force the scared and superstitious Mr. Mulder to promise to never call Kee a witch again.

The following day, Dik meets a girl named Nellie. He tells her that he is trying to figure out how Kee and Willem can potentially earn a living. Nellie thinks it could be possible with a barrel organ, which the local blacksmith (Mr. Van Driel) in town happens to be selling. Dik goes to Mr. Van Driel, Pieter's father, and asks him for the price. The smith says he wants 25 guilders for it, and after hearing that Dik wants to give the barrel organ to Kee and Willem, offers to donate 5 guilders. Dik visits the town's mayor to get a permission to collect the money. The mayor gives him permission, and donates 5 guilders as well. After suspecting they raised enough money, Dik, Pieter and Jan find out they have an excess of 19 guilders, and deliver it to Willem and Kee together with the barrel organ.

Shortly after, Kee's cousin Bastiaan visits Kee and Willem. After hearing about the barrel organ and money, he tries to extort the 19 guilders from Kee. Kee refuses, but after Bastiaan threatens to hit Willem, Kee gives him the money. Before leaving, Bastiaan damages the barrel organ after Willem told him he was an evil man. When Dik visits Willen and Kee again, he hears about Bastiaan's visit and gathers a group of friends to find Bastiaan. Dik splits up the group, and gives each subgroup a homing pigeon to inform Jan about Bastiaan's location if someone happens to find him. After going their way, Dik and Pieter suspect Bastiaan is in an old warehouse and sneak in the building.

But as they enter the building, they hear footsteps of Bastiaan and his friend called Voddeman, and decide to hide. While Bastiaan and Voddeman are drinking jenever, they suddenly hear the noises of the pigeon and find Pieter in a cupboard. Dik en Pieter manage to escape, and lock themselves up in a small room. They have just enough time to send the homing pigeon to Jan before they are forced to open the door. In his dovecote, Jan receives their message and gathers his friends using his trumpet. He informs them of Bastiaan's location and they set out to the old warehouse. Meanwhile in the old warehouse, a comical fight ensues between Dirk and Pieter, and Bastiaan and Voddeman. Just when Dik and Pieter are overpowered, Jan and his friend enter the room and start attacking Bastiaan and Voddeman. After Bastiaan and his friend are overpowered, Dik forces them to give back the stolen money.

After that, Willem and Kee are seen playing on their repaired barrel organ in front of Dik and his parents, before complimenting Dik's parents on their son's behaviour and courage.

== Cast ==
- Theo Frenkel as the mayor
- Douwe Koridon as Dik Trom
- Ben Kolman as Jan Vos
- Elsje Niestadt
- Jules Verstraete as patrolman Flipse
- Alex de Meester as The Scrooge
- Jo Vischer
- Clara Vischer-Blaaser
- Coby Ridder
- N.R. Josso
- Henny Schouten
