= Myrthe =

Dutch feminine given name

- Pronunciation: Dutch: [ˈmɪrtə]
- Gender: Feminine
- Language: Dutch

Origin
- Language: Greek
- Meaning: myrtle

Other names
- Alternative spelling: Myrte

Myrthe or Myrte (Dutch pronunciation: [ˈmɪrtə]) is a Dutch feminine given name, after the evergreen mirte (myrtle) plant. Myrtis was already a common ancient Greek name.

== People named Myrthe or Myrte ==
People with the given name Myrthe or Myrte include:

- Myrthe Bolt (born 1999), Dutch model
- Myrthe Hilkens (born 1979), Dutch journalist
- Myrthe Moorrees (born 1994), Dutch footballer
- Myrthe Schoenaker (born 1992), Dutch handball player
- Myrte van der Schoot (born 2004), Dutch track and field athlete
- Myrthe Schoot (born 1988), Dutch volleyball player

Fictional characters with the name Myrte include:

- Myrte, title character of the film Myrte of the Demons (1950)
