= Bernhard Droog =

Dutch actor (1921–2009)

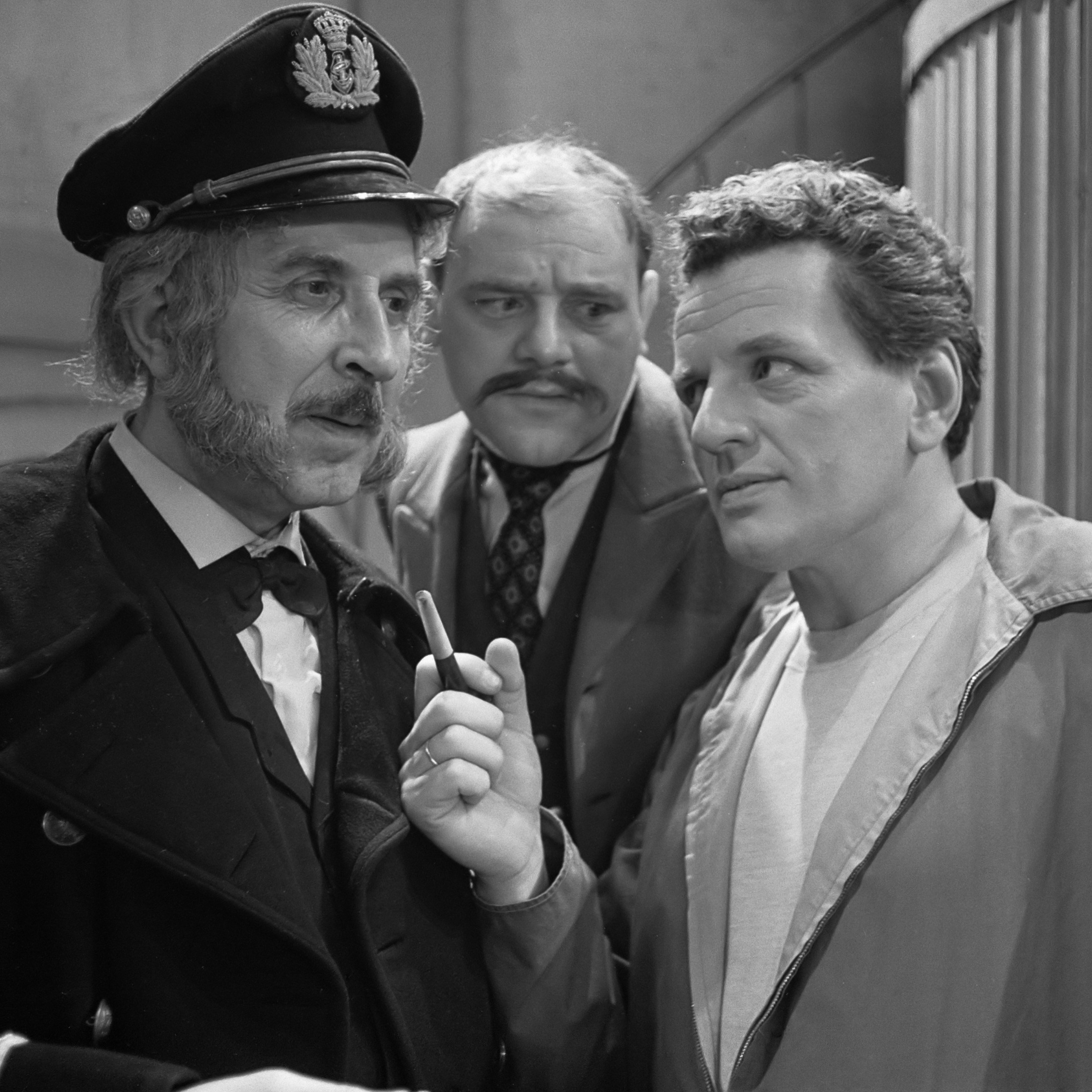
Hans Tiemeyer, Droog and Rob de Vries in 1962

Bernhard Droog (5 January 1921 in Cologne, Germany – 22 December 2009 in Ede, Netherlands) was a Dutch actor who appeared in 17 films, including the 1997 Academy Award-winning Character, and numerous television and theatre roles. Droog was a recipient of the Order of Orange-Nassau in 1970.

== Early life ==
Droog was born to Dutch parents living in Germany. He lived there until 1936, when the family decided to return to the Netherlands and moved to the city of Haarlem. Droog took up employment in a chemist's laboratory, and continued this work after another move to The Hague. He initially studied singing, with a view to joining an opera company (his parents had worked as semi-professional opera singers) but in 1945 he became a member of a theatre group run by Pierre Balledux, for whom he would make over 300 appearances.

== Film career ==
Droog's film debut came in 1955 in the role of Leraar in Ciske de Rat, based on a famous children's novel by author Piet Bakker, which in terms of cinema admissions remains one of the most popular films in Dutch history. He would appear in two comedy films, Kleren Maken de Man and Fanfare, followed by a leading role in the 1958 Academy Award-nominated Dorp aan de rivier. He also appeared in 1962 World War II drama De Overval.

After the early 1960s, Droog's film appearances became sporadic as he worked mainly in theatre and television. However he made notable appearances in Wat zien ik, a 1971 comedy centred on the lives of two Amsterdam prostitutes (and the first feature film directed by Paul Verhoeven), and another World War II feature, 1978's Pastorale 1943. Droog's final screen appearance came in 1997 in Character, which went on to win that year's Academy Award for Best Foreign Language Film.

== Death ==
The last decade of Droog's life was spent out of the public eye. He died of pneumonia on 22 December 2009, aged 88.

== Filmography ==
- 1953: Rechter Thomas (dir. Walter Smith)
- 1955: Ciske de Rat (dir. Wolfgang Staudte) - Leraar
- 1957: De vliegende Hollander (dir. Gerard Rutten)
- 1957: Kleren Maken de Man (dir. Georg Jacoby)
- 1958: Dorp aan de rivier (dir. Fons Rademakers) - Cis den Dove
- 1958: Fanfare (dir. Bert Haanstra) - Krijns
- 1960: De zaak M.P. (dir. Bert Haanstra) - Jef
- 1961: De Laatste Passagier (dir. Jef van der Heyden) - Maartjes vader
- 1962: Kermis in de Regen (dir. Kees Brusse) - Eigenaar gestolen auto (uncredited)
- 1962: De Overval (dir. Paul Rotha) - Jellema
- 1963: Fietsen naar de Maan (dir. Jef van der Heyden) - Politieagent Henk Egmond
- 1964: Spuit elf (dir. Paul Cammermans) - Pastoor
- 1971: Wat zien ik (dir. Paul Verhoeven) - Bob de Vries
- 1978: Pastorale 1943 (dir. Wim Verstappen) - Poerstamper
- 1979: Kort Amerikaans (dir. Guido Pieters) - Van Grouw
- 1979: Erik of het klein insectenboek (TV Series, dir. Hank Onrust) - Bij
- 1979: Een pak slaag (dir. Bert Haanstra) - Vrijst
- 1980: De Verjaring (TV Movie, dir. Kees Brusse) - Guus
- 1987: De ratelrat (dir. Wim Verstappen) - Commissaris
- 1997: Character (dir. Mike van Diem) - Stroomkoning (final film role)
