= Tol Hansse =

Dutch singer, composer, painter, trumpeter and cabaret artist (1940–2002)

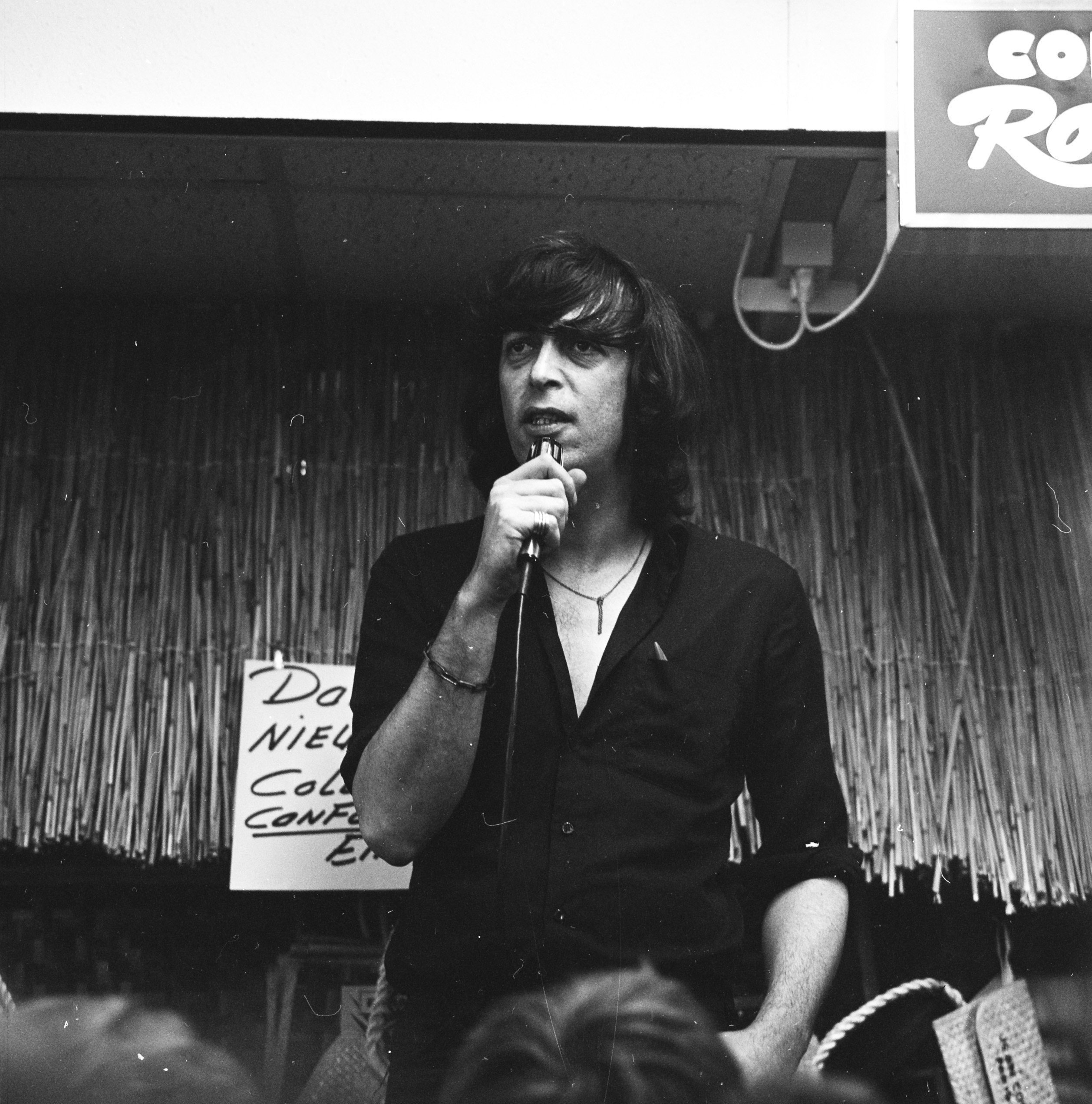
Tol Hansse

Tol Hansse (born Johannes Adrianus "Hans" van Tol, 3 April 1940, Laren - 29 April 2002) was a Dutch singer and musician. He was the son of cabaret artist Jacques van Tol. Because of his father's history of collaboration during World War II he changed his name. Hansse played trumpet accompanying Tom Manders, and was in the rock band The Sharks with Clous van Mechelen. He had a modestly successful career as a singer-songwriter in the 1970s. Van Mechelen wrote the music for his biggest hit, "Big City" (1978), still considered a classic song about Amsterdam. He never rivaled the success of that song again, and died of lung cancer in Heerhugowaard in 2002.
