= The Spectacular =

Dutch crime miniseries

- Genre: Crime thriller, drama
- Written by: Pieter Kuijpers Willem Bosch
- Directed by: Pieter Kuijpers Willem Bosch
- Starring: Hadewych Minis, Jacob Derwig
- Music by: Arno Krabman
- Country of origin: The Netherlands
- Original languages: Dutch, English, Irish Gaelic
- No. of seasons: 1
- No. of episodes: 4

Production
- Executive producer: Alexander Blaauw
- Producer: Pieter Kuijpers Sander van Meurs Iris Otten
- Production locations: The Netherlands, Germany, Belgium
- Cinematography: Bert Pot
- Editor: Herman P. Koerts
- Running time: 52-56 minutes
- Production companies: Pupkin; VPRO

Original release
- Network: NPO 3
- Release: 2 January – 23 January 2022

The Spectacular is a 2021 Dutch-Irish crime television series directed and written by Willem Bosch together with Pieter Kuijpers and produced by Kuijpers's production company Pupkin. The series is set in the Dutch province of Limburg in the late 1980's when a series of attacks were carried out by the Provisional Irish Republican Army.

== Dramatization ==
The character Fiona Hughes is based on Donna Maguire, who, like brother Malachy Maguire, was a member of the Provisional IRA. Hughes left husband and children in the series to fight for the IRA, but in reality she didn't have children until later, with Leonard Hardy, another IRA activist. She was arrested a number of times and eventually convicted in Germany but was released by the court due to a lengthy preliminary imprisonment.

The role of Jeanine Maes is based on Cees Verhaeren, who in reality led the investigation team. In addition to explosives scout, this police officer was also a negotiator-coordinator for hostage situations and specialized in intelligence work. He worked as Chief of the Regional Intelligence Service Limburg. The cooperation he manages to establish between neighboring countries and the Northern Ireland police has been faithfully portrayed.

== Production ==
- Due to the COVID-19 pandemic, production company Pupkin could not film in multiple countries as intended, so the decision was made to recreate all foreign sets in the Netherlands.

== Episodes ==
No. overall	No. in season	Title	Directed by	Written by	Original release date
1	1	"Tribal struggle" (Dutch: Stammenstrijd)	Willem Bosch; Pieter Kuijpers	Willem Bosch; Pieter Kuijpers	January 2, 2022
The Dutch-Belgian-German border region is shaken by a series of IRA attacks on British soldiers stationed in West Germany. An investigation team is being formed, led by detective Jeanine Maes. The investigation is difficult because the police services of the different countries do not work together. It seems that the authorities are training the investigative activities. After an arrest, the case seems solved, but a mysterious female member of the IRA cell, Fiona Hughes, is still missing.
2	2	"Political bodies" (Dutch: Politieke lichamen)	Willem Bosch; Pieter Kuijpers	Willem Bosch; Pieter Kuijpers	January 9, 2022
In Germany another attack is perpetrated by the IRA cell, this time involving Fiona Hughes. Jeanine knows that it is only a matter of time before the members will also commit another attack in the Netherlands. She makes a plan to be one step ahead of the IRA members, but miscalculates.
3	3	"The devil himself" (Dutch: De duivel zelf)	Willem Bosch; Pieter Kuijpers	Willem Bosch; Pieter Kuijpers	January 16, 2022
A violent attack in Roermond became world news and led to widespread indignation. A major criminal investigation follows and Janine is seeking international support. Meanwhile, the IRA leadership suspects that there is treason and therefore sends a confidant to the Netherlands to put things in order. This leads to the members of the cell coming under heavy pressure.
4	4	"The Irish cause"	Willem Bosch; Pieter Kuijpers	Willem Bosch; Pieter Kuijpers	January 23, 2022
By chance, Fiona and the other members of the cell are arrested. Only their leader Declan manages to stay out of harm's way. Despite the fact that the evidence is piling up, it is proving difficult to get the suspects convicted. Because the Netherlands has no anti-terrorism laws, prosecutor De Rondt has to prove the personal part of the suspects in the murders committed. Jeanine plays a crucial role in this, but she will have to give up her secret to do so. When interests at a higher level appear to play a role, Jeanine is faced with the choice of whether she will speak the truth.

== Awards ==
Award	Date of ceremony	Category	Recipient(s)	Result	Ref(s)
Gouden Kalf	October 1, 2021	Best Supporting Actor Drama Series (2021)	Michel Sluysmans	Won	

== Cast ==
- David Eeles - George, MI5
- Hadewych Minis - Jeanine Maes
- Aoibhínn McGinnity - Fiona Hughes
- Carina de Vroome - Leonie van Hartog
- Jacob Derwig - Frank Maes
- Michel Sluysmans - Martin de Waard
- Jochum ten Haaf - Joris
- Porgy Franssen - Sjuul Livestro
- Kenneth Herdigein - Boudewijn de Rondt
- Ian Beattie - Corey O'Keefe
- Kerr Logan - Patrick Lynch
- Cillian Lenaghan - Paul O'Keeffe
- Declan Conlon - Declan Moore
- Michael Patrick - Robin
- Gary Crossan - Michael Handler
- Torsten Colijn - Andrew Garrison
- Fred Goessens - Joep Henriks
- Karen Sibbing - Hedwig
- Nevajo Rezai - Danny Maes
- Mitchell Havelaar - John Habets

== Reception ==
Walter van der Kooi, writing for De Groene Amsterdammer, said the show lived up to its name. He praised every aspect of the show, including its scope, its international cast, its production, and its ambition.
