= Richard knapt het op =

- Directed by: Henk van der Linden
- Written by: Henk van der Linden
- Release date: 1943
- Country: Netherlands
- Language: Dutch

Richard knapt het op is a 1943 Dutch film directed by Henk van der Linden.

== Cast ==
- Werner Tiemans ... The cross-eyed
- Rinus Bonekamp ... Rudolf Roodhaar
- Martin Vermegen ... Landlord
- Dirk Capel ... Dirk
- Henk van der Linden
