= Kenneth Herdigein =

Dutch actor (born 1959)

- Born: 12 June 1959 (age 66); Paramaribo, Suriname
- Occupation: Actor
- Years active: 1983–present

Kenneth Herdigein (born June 12, 1959, in Paramaribo) is a Dutch actor of Surinamese descent, best known as a television actor in popular Dutch comedy-dramas.

== Career ==
Herdigein first gained popularity as a television actor in the 1980s, in such shows as Opzoek naar Yolanda (1984), We zijn weer thuis (1989-1994), and Zeg 'ns Aaa (1988-1993).

Herdigein has also performed in musicals, such as Amandla! Mandela, 2009 in which he played Nelson Mandela, and has directed for the stage, such as Adio...mijn liefste (1995), in which he also performed, and Ons Kent Ons (2011), a cabaret-musical dealing with the Dutch history of slavery performed in the Tropenmuseum. He was supposed to play Mufasa in the first Dutch production of The Lion King, but was forced to resign due to vocal issues. He was replaced by Edwin Jonker.

In 2005, he was given the Cosmic Award (by Job Cohen) at the annual Hollandse Nieuwe theater festival in Amsterdam; the award is given to the best Dutch artist of non-Dutch descent.

== Selected filmography ==
=== Television ===
- Opzoek naar Yolanda (1984)
- We zijn weer thuis (1989-1994)
- Zeg 'ns Aaa (1988-1993)
- 12 steden, 13 ongelukken (1997)
- Baantjer (1998-1999)
- Flikken Maastricht (2007)
- Keyzer & De Boer Advocaten (2005-2008)
- Spangas (2008-2011)
- Goede tijden, slechte tijden (2006-2018)
- The Spectacular (2021)

=== Musicals ===
- Amandla! Mandela (2009)
- Ons kent ons (2011)

=== Stage ===
- Adio...mijn liefste (1995)
