= Kerr Logan =

Stage and screen actor from Northern Ireland

Kerr Logan is a stage and screen actor, best known as Matthew, Robin Ellacott's fiancé, in Strike, and Matthos in Game of Thrones. He was born in Bangor, County Down, and grew up in Lancashire. His television credits include:

Year	Title	Role	Notes
2012	Game of Thrones	Matthos Seaworth	Season 2 episode 9.
2013	London Irish	Conor Lynch	
2013	Good Vibrations	Feargal Sharkey	
2016	My Mother and Other Strangers	Failey	
2017	Genius	Georges Braque	Season 1 "Picasso"
2017	Alias Grace	James McDermott	
2019	Victoria	Patrick Fitzgerald	Series 3
2020–present	Strike	Matthew Cunliffe	
2020	Dead Still	Conall Molloy	
2021	The Spectacular	Patrick Lynch	
2021	Showtrial	James Thornley	Series 1 episode 4.
2022	North Sea Connection	Aidan Kenny	Logan nominated for 2023; IFTA Award for Best Lead Actor – TV Drama
2023	The Killing Kind	DS Luke Nash	
2024	The Boy That Never Was	Ollie	

Stage appearances include Kilian in Fiona Doyle's Coolatully at London's Finborough Theatre in 2014.

== Personal life ==
Kerr is married to actress Sara Vickers. They met while both studying at RADA. They have two children.
