= Ronny Bierman =

Dutch actress (1938–1984)

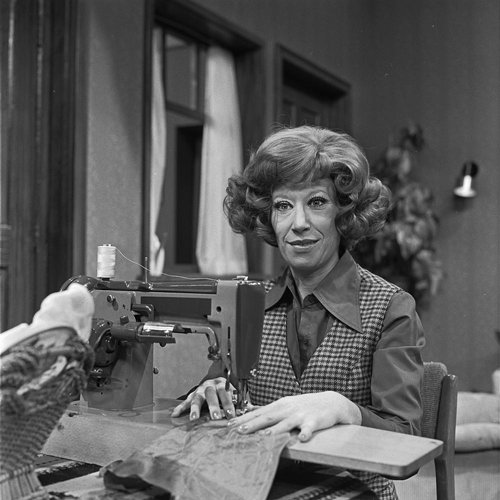
Bierman in Hotel de Botel (1976)

Ronny Greetje Bierman (12 July 1938, Amsterdam – Amsterdam, 3 February 1984) was a Dutch film and television actress.

She is known for her role in Business Is Business (1971).

== Partial filmography ==
- Business Is Business (1971)
- Kapsalon (1972)
- The Burglar (1972)
- Living Apart Together (1973)
- Happy Days Are Here Again (1975)
- Blood Relations (1977)
- Quitte of Dubbel (1977) (TV film)
- De Mantel der Liefde (1978)
