= De Witte Waan =

1984 film

- Theatrical release poster
- Directed by: Adriaan Ditvoorst
- Written by: Adriaan Ditvoorst
- Starring: Thom Hoffman; Pim Lambeau; Louise Ruys
- Release date: 1984
- Running time: 96 minutes
- Country: Netherlands
- Language: Dutch

De Witte Waan is a 1984 Dutch film directed by Adriaan Ditvoorst. Its USA title is White Madness.

== Cast ==
- Thom Hoffman ... Lazlo
- Pim Lambeau ... Moeder
- Louise Ruys ... Tante
- Guusje van Tilborgh ... Jasja
- Hans Croiset ... Portier / Man ongeluk
- Jules Croiset ... Vader
- Pamela Koevoets ... Dokter
- Hilde Van Mieghem ... Lili
- Joe Hennes ... Fuji
- Luk van Mello ... Dealer
- Theo van Gogh ... Junk
