= De Nieuwe Avonturen van Dik Trom =

1958 film

- Directed by: Henk van der Linden
- Release date: 1958
- Running time: 88 minutes
- Country: Netherlands
- Language: Dutch

De Nieuwe Avonturen van Dik Trom is a 1958 Dutch film directed by Henk van der Linden. The film was based on the popular children's book series Dik Trom by Cornelis Johannes Kieviet.

== Cast ==
- Sjefke Nievelstein as Dik Trom
- Rinus Bonekamp as patrolman Flipse
- Minnie Mennens as Blind Nelly
- Michel Odekerken as Dik Trom's father
- Mia Maessen as Dik Trom's mother
- Thea Eyssen as Blind Nelly's mother
