= Cosmic Award =

Dutch theater award

The Cosmic Award is given annually at the Hollandse Nieuwe theater festival in Amsterdam to the best Dutch artist of non-Dutch descent.

== Winners ==
- Najib Amhali
- Jörgen Raymann
- Jetty Mathurin
- Kenneth Herdigein (2005)
