= Business Is Business (1971 film) =

- Theatrical release poster
- Directed by: Paul Verhoeven
- Written by: Albert Mol; Gerard Soeteman
- Produced by: Rob Houwer
- Starring: Ronnie Bierman; Sylvia de Leur; Piet Römer; Jules Hamel
- Cinematography: Jan de Bont
- Edited by: Jan Bosdriesz
- Music by: Jan Stoeckart
- Production company: Rob Houwer Film Holland N.V.
- Release date: 10 September 1971 (Netherlands)
- Running time: 90 minutes
- Country: Netherlands
- Language: Dutch
- Budget: US$116,421
- Box office: US$1.3 million (Netherland rentals)

Business Is Business (Dutch title: Wat zien ik, translated: What Do I See) is a 1971 Dutch comedy film directed by Paul Verhoeven in his feature-length directorial debut. Based on two books by Albert Mol, the film, starring Ronnie Bierman, Sylvia de Leur, Piet Römer and Jules Hamel, follows the lives of two prostitutes in Amsterdam.

== Premise ==
The film is about the customers and personal lives of Greet (Ronnie Bierman) and Nel (Sylvia de Leur), two female prostitutes in Amsterdam. Greet and Nel are friends and live on different floors of the same canal house at the Prinsengracht. In this house they also receive customers.

=== Sexual fantasies ===
Greet roleplays the customers' sexual fantasies. These incidents are recounted in the form of anecdotes throughout the film. The roleplaying involves Greet being a wicked witch, a schoolteacher, a feathered chicken, a corpse, a woman commanding her cleaner, and a surgeon. Sometimes Nel assists her by playing a part in the roleplaying.

=== Nel and Sjaak ===
Nel lives with Sjaak (Jules Hamel), a guy who likes fishing and who lives on Nel's money. Nel and Sjaak are continuously fighting. Greet convinces Nel to respond to a personal ad. The following blind date in a restaurant ends up in throwing cakes. Nel wants to clean her dress and then she meets Bob (Bernhard Droog) and they fall in love. In another fight Sjaak almost kills Nel with a knife, and Nel decides to move in with Bob in Eindhoven. Bob turns out to be boring, and Nel visits Greet in Amsterdam. Nel no longer wishes to work as a prostitute, and she turns out to be pregnant. Nel and Bob marry in Amsterdam, and all of Nel's former colleagues pretend that she worked as a seamstress.

=== Greet and Piet ===
Greet meets a married man, Piet (Piet Römer), in the bar where she hangs out. He takes her to a striptease club, and afterward they have sex at her house. Unlike the other men, he doesn't have to pay. Piet brings Greet a bouquet of red roses. The next time they meet, they create a romantic atmosphere and he stays overnight with her. Later, he takes her to a classical concert. She dislikes it and makes a scene in the concert hall. When Piet finds out his wife is pregnant he stops seeing Greet. At the end of the film they meet again, and Greet says he should name his child "Greet" if it is a girl.

The film ends when Greet makes the customer that plays the cleaner clean up Nel's marriage party.

== Cast ==
- Ronnie Bierman as Blonde Greet
- Sylvia de Leur as Neeltje "Nel" Muller
- Piet Römer as Piet
- Jules Hamel as Sjaak
- Bernhard Droog as Bob de Vries
- Albert Mol as Mr. Van Schaveren, Nel's date

== Production ==
Business Is Business was director Paul Verhoeven's first feature film.

Gerard Soeteman wrote the film scenario, which was his first feature film script. He based the story on the two books Wat zien ik!? and Haar van Boven written by Albert Mol. Mol also has a small role in the film as Mr. Van Schaveren.

The opening scene is shot at Schiphol Airport. Many scenes in the film are shot in the city of Amsterdam, most in the canal house, in the red-light district, and at the canals.

== Reception ==
The film had 2,358,946 admissions in the Netherlands and was one of the most popular Dutch films in 1971 and one of the most popular films of all time, surpassing Gone With the Wind and The Sound of Music, and returning the distributor $1.3 million.
