= Kees, de zoon van de Stroper =

- Directed by: Ernst Winar
- Written by: Inge van Eyck
- Release date: 20 December 1950
- Running time: 70 minutes
- Country: Netherlands
- Language: Dutch

Kees, de zoon van de Stroper is a 1951 Dutch film directed by Ernst Winar.

== Cast ==
- Sjoerd van Driel as Kees Schippers
- Jaap Kallenborn
- Ankie de Meyer as Joke van Dalen
- Dick Visser as Arie
- Paul Kallenborn as Jaap van Dalen
- Aleid van Rhein as Father van Dalen
- Lex de Koning as Piet
- Wim Rhemrev as Henk
- Hylke van der Zee as Jan
- Bart van Mourik as Wim
- Frans Merkelij as Wim
