= Avonturen van een Zigeunerjongen =

1960 film

- Directed by: Henk van der Linden
- Release date: 23 December 1960
- Running time: 80 minutes
- Country: Netherlands
- Language: English

Avonturen van een Zigeunerjongen is a 1960 Dutch film directed by Henk van der Linden.

== Cast ==
- Louk Perry ... Roberto
- Cor van der Linden ... Cor
- No Bours ... Tuinman
- Thea Eyssen ... Baronesse de Haghe
- Frits van Wenkop ... Lajos
- Lies Bours ... Lajos' vrouw
- Michel Odekerken... Huisknecht
- Wim van der Weide ... Zigeunerhoofdman
- Hub Consten ... Advocaat
- Diny Cuypers ... Mevrouw Blank
