= The Village on the River =

Dorp aan de Rivier
- Directed by: Fons Rademakers
- Written by: Hugo Claus (writer & dialogue), Antoon Coolen (novel)
- Release date: 19 August 1958
- Running time: 92 minutes
- Country: Netherlands
- Language: Dutch

Village by the River (Dutch: Dorp aan de rivier) is a 1958 Dutch film directed by Fons Rademakers. The film was nominated for the Best Foreign Language Film at the 32nd Academy Awards.

== Plot ==
In the early 20th century, in the Dutch province of Brabant, Dr. Tjerk van Taeke, the village doctor, has his own unique approach to medicine. Despite opposition, his methods bring significant success. However, his unconventional behavior, including befriending a local poacher, leads to conflict with village authorities, especially the mayor who wants him gone.

When one of his patients, the miller's assistant, commits suicide after seeing him, the villagers, urged by their leaders, turn against him. Despite a drunken "vigil" by some, the situation turns into a farce. Then, when Dr. van Taeke's wife unexpectedly dies, he sees no reason to stay in the village.

== Cast ==
- Max Croiset as Dr. Van Taeke
- Mary Dresselhuys as Mrs. Van Taeke
- Bernhard Droog as Cis den Dove
- Jan Retèl as Thijs van Erpen
- Jan Teulings as Burgemeester
- Jan Lemaire Sr. as Willem
- Hans Kaart as Sjef
- Herman Bouber as Nardje
- Tamara Garcia as Zigeunerin
- Huib Orizand as Pie
- Louis van Gasteren Sr. as Oom Jan
- Lou Geels as Veldwachter
- Frans 't Hoen as Dirk Jan

== Awards ==
Nominated

- Academy Award: Best Foreign Language Film
- Berlin Film Festival: Golden Bear

== See also ==
- List of submissions to the 32nd Academy Awards for Best Foreign Language Film
- List of Dutch submissions for the Academy Award for Best Foreign Language Film
