= The Silent Raid =

1962 film by Paul Rotha

- Directed by: Paul Rotha
- Written by: Dr. L. de Jong
- Produced by: Rudolf Meyer
- Starring: Rob de Vries, Kees Brusse, Piet Römer, Bernard Droog
- Distributed by: Omrop Fryslȃn
- Release date: 21 December 1962
- Running time: 98 minutes
- Country: Netherlands
- Language: Dutch

The Silent Raid (Dutch: De Overval) is a 1962 Dutch war film directed by Paul Rotha. It is based on a true story from World War II: the raid on Leeuwarden prison of 8 December 1944. Without firing a shot, Dutch resistance members disguised as German SD and their prisoners entered the prison, freed 51 prisoners and vanished into the city. The Germans were unable to find any of the organizers or escapees.

The film was entered into the 3rd Moscow International Film Festival, and was one of the most successful in the Netherlands (1,474,000 tickets sold). The screenplay was written by Loe de Jong.

== Cast ==
- Ab Abspoel as PTT-monteur Jan
- Henk Admiraal as Hein de Zwijger
- Chris Baay as Vos
- Hetty Beck as Eppie's mother
- Yoka Berretty as Mies
- Kees Brusse
- Bernard Droog
- Piet Römer
- Rob de Vries
