= Albert Mol =

Dutch actor (1917–2004)

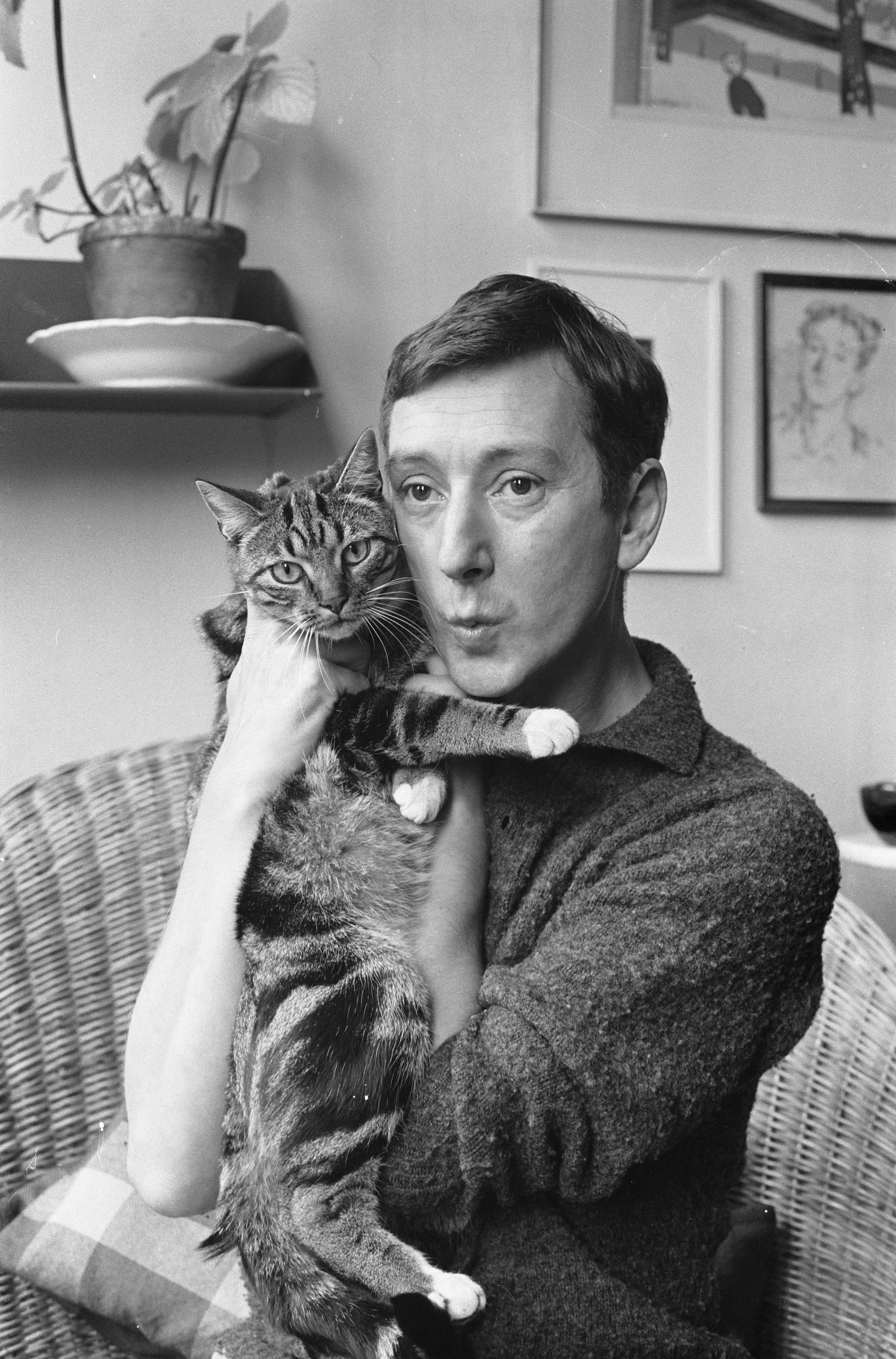
- Albert Mol in 1962
- Born: 3 January 1917; Amsterdam, Netherlands
- Died: 9 March 2004 (aged 87); Laren, Gelderland, Netherlands
- Resting place: Dieren Imboslaan Cemetery, Dieren, Rheden Municipality, Gelderland, Netherlands
- Occupations: author; actor; television personality

Albert Mol (3 January 1917 – 9 March 2004) was a Dutch author, actor and television personality.

== Life and career ==
Mol was born in Amsterdam, and was one of the first openly gay actors in the Netherlands. He married Lucy Bor in 1948. The couple had a child the following year, actress Kika Mol, but divorced in 1955.

On 16 March 1998, Mol registered his relationship with his partner Guerdon Bill. Their relationship lasted until Guerdon's death on 17 August 2003. Mol died in Laren on 9 March 2004 from an aneurysm, aged 87.

== Books ==
- Breek me de bek niet open (with Frans Mulder)
- Het doek viel te vroeg
- Wat Zien Ik!?
- Haar van Boven
- Blonde Greet
- Dag dag welterusten
- Mengele broek en pintje billen (autobiographical)

== Books on Albert Mol ==
- Albert Mol (by Tony van Verre)
