= Trouwe Kameraden =

- Directed by: Henk van der Linden
- Written by: Henk van der Linden
- Release date: 9 August 1957
- Running time: 81 minutes
- Country: Netherlands
- Language: Dutch

Trouwe Kameraden is a 1957 Dutch film directed by Henk van der Linden.

== Cast ==
- Martin Heijnekamp ... Jan
- Thea Eyssen ... Tante
- Buck Stevens ... Molenaar
- Frits van Wenkop ... Crimineel
- Giel Backbier ... Oom
- Dirk Capel ... Crimineel
- Frans Franssen ... Neefje Klaas
- Nico Kwerreveld ... Kampeerder
- Willem Marwa ... Kampeerder
- Leo Mullers ... Kampeerder
- Jos van der Linden ... Joske
