= Ronflonflon =

Dutch radio show (1984–1991)

Ronflonflon, or Ronflonflon avec Jacques Plafond ("Ronflonflon with Jacques Plafond"), was a radio show on the Dutch broadcaster VPRO. It was produced and directed by Wim T. Schippers who also played the principal character and radio host, Jacques Plafond. Between 10 October 1984 and 30 January 1991, 328 episodes were produced, and it became the VPRO's best-listened radio program.

The show was characterized by chaos. Plafond frequently interrupted his guests and the obligatory news readers, and cut off records if he didn't like them. The regular cast included characters such as Jan Vos (Clous van Mechelen) and Wilhelmina Kuttje Jr. (Janine van Elzakker). It was notable also for the plethora of jingles; some a minute long, some jingles for jingles, and some self-referential, such as the well-known "Oh what a nice jingle this is". There were more than 100 jingles written by Schippers and van Mechelen, all archived by Nienke Feis. The show was notable also for its many puns and linguistic jokes, some of which have crept into the Dutch language. For example, Plafond invented and consistently used his own second person singular pronoun "joe", an in-between version of the two possible pronouns in Dutch, "je" (informal) and "u" (formal).

Memorable moments from the show include an aborted interview with Gerard Reve on 14 December 1988 (Reve's birthday). For an entire day jingles had been hyping up the big Plafond - Reve conversation; promising sharp questions and discussions on the meaning of life; in the end, Plafond's first question was whether Reve really believed in God, to which Reve responded by saying that he didn't wish to answer a question posed that way, and hung up.

A selection from Ronflonflon and other radio shows done by Schippers was released on CD in 2009, De radiopraktijken van Wim T. Schippers.

== Jacques Plafond ==
Jacques Plafond, besides being the show's host, was featured in many of Schippers' television shows and other productions, such as Opzoek naar Yolanda (1984, scheduled to run concurrently with Ronflonflon) and Plafond over de vloer (1986, a television show based on the radio show).

As a singer, a notable performance by Plafond was opening the Holland Festival in 1980, in the Schippers production De dans der vierkanten waarin opgenomen Elly, of het beroemde stuk (released on DVD by the VPRO).

With his band "Jacques Plafond & his Plafonnières" he released an album in 1980, Hark!, which was remade in 2008 by the experimental arts organisation Worm as an homage to Schippers. The original has been described as "an almost successful pop record, with Zappa-esque excurses and a fair bit of doowop-like insanity." Compilation albums with songs from the Ronflonflon shows include Geen Touw (1990) and Schippers in Plafondvaart (1992).
