= Wim Brands =

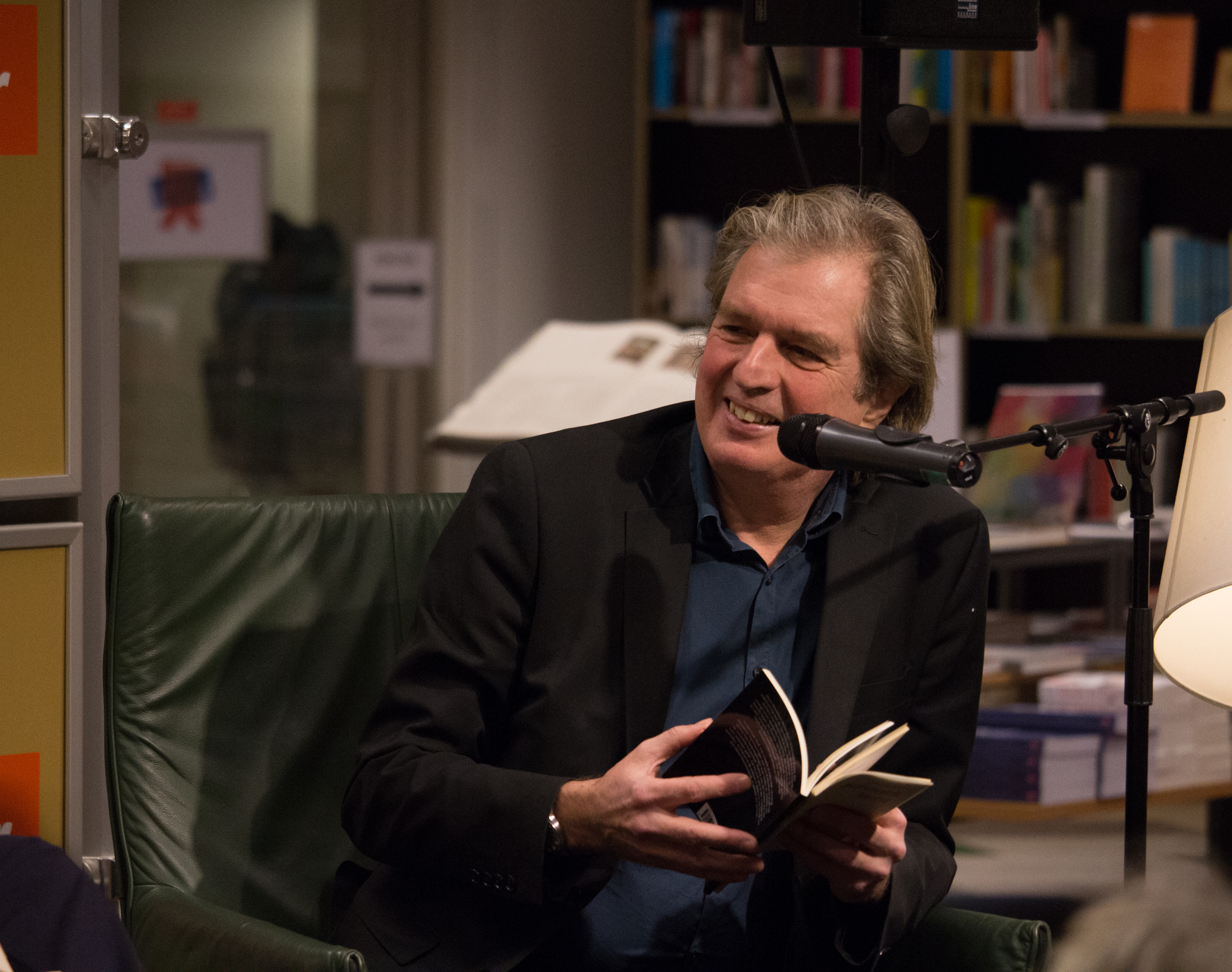
- Wim Brands in 2015
- Born: 29 March 1959; Brummen
- Died: 4 April 2016 (aged 57); Amsterdam
- Occupations: poet, TV presenter
- Years active: 1978–2016

Wim Brands (Brummen, 29 March 1959 – Amsterdam, 4 April 2016) was a Dutch poet, journalist and TV presenter.

== Biography ==
Brands in 2012 on the radio broadcast, Het Filosofisch Kwintet

In 1978, the then 19-year-old Brands made his debut as a poet in Hollands Maandblad. His work appeared in literary magazines and he published several books, some of which involved poetry: Inslag (1985), Koningen, de gehavende (1990), Zwemmen in de nacht (1995), In de metro (1997), De schoenen van de buurman (1999), Ruimtevaart (2005), Neem me mee, zei de hond (2010), Serendipiteit: over ontdekkingslust en wetenschap (2014), Sterven is doodeenvoudig: iedereen kan het (2014) and finally ’s Middags zwem ik in de Noordzee (2014). He was also a member of the jury of ECI Literatuurprijs.

On 26 January 2012, Compaan Uitgevers published his anthology De vijftig beste gedichten van Wim Brands (50 of the best Poems by Wim Brands).

Brands began his career working as a journalist at Leidsch Dagblad and Vrij Nederland. Since 1987, Brands has worked for the Dutch broadcaster VPRO. He was one of the producers and presenters of the radioshow De Avonden. Brands was most recognised as a presenter of the television show Boeken on contemporary literature. In 2009, he received a medal of honor from the writer's association Vereniging van Letterkundigen (VvL).

In 2013/2014 he was Writer in Residence at University College London.

== Late life and death ==
Wim Brands was last seen as presenter on the television show Boeken on 20 March 2016. He had been presenting this program for the last 11 years of his life. The program was then taken over a week later by Jeroen van Kan, who later reported that Brands medical condition prevented him from presenting the show. On 4 April 2016 Brands died aged 57. The broadcaster VPRO later reported that Brands suffered from depression and that it eventually resulted into him taking his own life.

== Philosophy ==
Next to literature, philosophy played an important role in his life. He worked for Human (Dutch humanistic broadcast company) and interviewed multiple Dutch philosophers for his radio program.

== Programs ==
- Boeken
- De Avonden
- Boeken op reis
- Brands met denkers: Grote Woorden
- Marathoninterviews
- Brands met boeken
- Boeken op bezoek
