= Dik Trom =

Dutch series of children's books

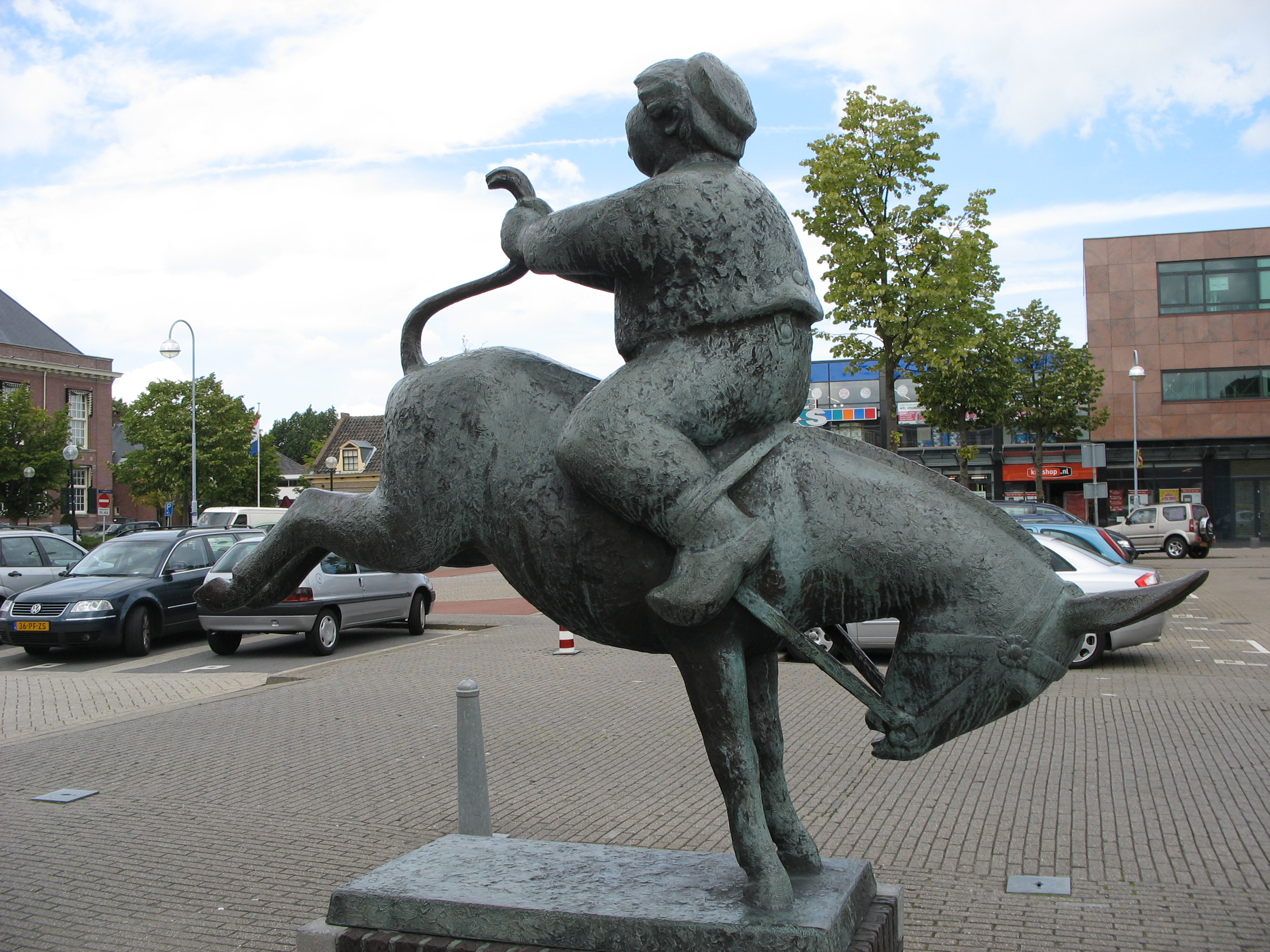
- Statue of Dik Trom, riding a donkey backwards, a classic depiction of Dik Trom (artist: Nico Onkenhout)
- Author: Cornelis Johannes Kieviet
- Country: Netherlands
- Genre: Children's literature
- Media type: Print, audiobook

Dik Trom is a series of Dutch children's books by Cornelis Johannes Kieviet, centered on the character Dik Trom (a mischievous oversized Dutch boy). The series is well regarded as a classic in its home country.

== Books ==
- 1891 Uit het leven van Dik Trom. Valkhoff & Co.
- 1907 De zoon van Dik Trom. Valkhoff & Co.
- 1912 Toen Dik Trom een jongen was. Kluitman.
- 1920 Dik Trom en zijn dorpsgenoten . Kluitman.
- 1923 Het tweede boek van Dik Trom en zijn dorpsgenoten. Kluitman.
- 1931 De avonturen van Dik Trom. Kluitman.
- 2016 The Wild Adventures of Dik Trom.

== Film adaptations ==
Several Dutch movies were made based on the books:

- 1937 Uit het leven van Dik Trom
- 1947 Dik Trom en zijn dorpsgenoten
- 1958 De Nieuwe Avonturen van Dik Trom
- 1960 Dik Trom en het circus
- 1973 Dik Trom en zijn dorpsgenoten
- 1974 Dik Trom knapt het op
- 1976 Dik Trom weet raad
- 2010 Dik Trom

== Comic book adaptation ==
Dick Matena also adapted the novel into a comic book album.
