= Henk van der Linden (filmmaker) =

Dutch film producer (1925–2021)

- Henk van der Linden
- Born: 3 May 1925; Hoensbroek, Limburg, Netherlands
- Died: 18 December 2021 (aged 96); Tüddern, Heinsberg, North Rhine-Westphalia, Germany
- Occupations: Film director; film producer; screenwriter; cinematographer; production designer; film editor; actor
- Years active: 1944–1985

Henk van der Linden (3 May 1925 – 18 December 2021) was a Dutch film director.

== Early life and career ==
His father was a cinema operator and ran a film rental office in Hoensbroek. Van der Linden made his first film in 1944 at the age of eighteen. In 1952 he made his first real feature film. This film (titled Three Boys and a Dog, Dutch: Drie jongens en een hond) was shot by Van der Linden on 16mm film, without sound. He just made the sound live when showing it in community centers. This film was such a big success that Van der Linden decided to start filming on 35mm.

Van der Linden wrote his stories himself and often based them on heroes from literary youth literature: Dik Trom, Sjors & Sjimmie, Pietje Bell and Billy Bunter. Most of Henk van der Linden's films were shot in the Limburg hills and near his former hometown of Thull in the municipality of Schinnen.

Since the 2010s Van der Linden lived in the German town of Tüddern, directly across the border near Sittard. He died there at the age of 96.

== Records ==
Henk van der Linden has several records to his name. He is the most productive filmmaker in the Netherlands. No other Dutch filmmaker has produced as many feature films as Van der Linden. His film De Nieuwe Avonturen van Dik Trom is in the Guinness Book of Records as the longest running Dutch feature film ever: it was shown continuously in one or more cinemas for 28 years.

== Filmography ==
- Richard knapt het op (1943)
- Sjors van de Rebellenclub (1955)
- Trouwe Kameraden (1957)
- De Nieuwe Avonturen van Dik Trom (1958)
- Het Geheim van de Oude Molen (1959)
- Avonturen van een Zigeunerjongen (1960)
- De Avonturen van Pietje Bell (1964)
- Billy Turf het dikste studentje ter wereld (1978)
- Billy Turf Haantje de voorste (1981)
- Billy Turf contra Kwel (1982)
