= Paranoia (1967 film) =

1967 film

- Directed by: Adriaan Ditvoorst
- Written by: Adriaan Ditvoorst; Willem Frederik Hermans
- Produced by: Gijs Versluys
- Starring: Kees van Eyck
- Cinematography: Jan de Bont
- Edited by: Jan Bosdriesz
- Release date: 20 April 1967
- Running time: 102 minutes
- Country: Netherlands
- Language: Dutch

Paranoia is a 1967 Dutch drama film directed by Adriaan Ditvoorst. It was entered into the 17th Berlin International Film Festival.

== Cast ==
- Kees van Eyck - Arnold Cleever
- Pamela Koevoets - Anna (as Pamela Rose)
- Rudolf Lucieer - Reclametekenaar
- Paul Murk - Cleevers oom
- Mimi Kok - Zijn maîtresse
- Ab van Ieperen
- Ton Vos - Anna's vader
- Rob du Mee - Priester
- Max Kok
- Helene Kamphuis
- Ko Roblin
- Jan ter Oever
