= Opzoek naar Yolanda =

- Country of origin: Netherlands
- Original language: Dutch

Original release
- Network: VPRO

Opzoek naar Yolanda (Note: Schippers combined two words ("op zoek") into one; it's a regular running linguistic joke in the show, with more than half a dozen other examples noted.) is a Dutch dramady television show by Wim T. Schippers, consisting of six episodes aired by the VPRO from October to December 1984. The show (a parody of sitcoms and soap operas, like most of Schippers' shows) was a continuation of sorts of Schippers' De lachende scheerkwast (1981-1982) and featured some of the same characters. In turn, it was a kind of prequel to We zijn weer thuis, which ran from 1989 to 1994.

Story and script were written by Schippers, who directed the show with his longtime associate Ellen Jens. Schippers himself portrays Jacques Plafond.

== Plot ==
Photographer Rik Rollinga (Kenneth Herdigein), on his way to take a formal portrait of the Dutch queen (the invitation turns out to be a practical joke), catches a glimpse of a beautiful young woman, Yolanda, on the Baarn train station. He snaps a quick photograph of her and falls in love. For the rest of the series he tries his best to find her again. Along the way, he falls into one comical situation after another. He hires alcoholic private investigator Rein Schaambergen to help him, but Schaambergen is too drunk to be of any help. In desperation he turns to Jacques Plafond and plans to make a hit record (arranged by Jan Vos) to make her fall in love with him, but sings so poorly that he is replaced by a better singer—his neighbor Victor van Vliet records the song, "Smoke, Gammon and Spinach", which becomes a hit, and Rik is kicked out of the studio. He flees to the Bahamas but is tracked down by Schaambergen and returned to the Netherlands, with the promise that Yolanda is found. Unfortunately, Schaambergen has failed and presents the wrong Yolanda (the ugly daughter of the baker, Ruud van Hemert). In the end it turns out that Yolanda lives upstairs from him and is Victor's girlfriend. The basic storyline is larded with skits involving many of Schippers' characters from previous shows.

== Cast ==
- Kenneth Herdigein as Rik Rollinga
- Adriaan van Dis as himself
- Wim T. Schippers as Jacques Plafond
- Ruud van Hemert as the baker
- Lex de Regt as Hein Schaambergen
- Clous van Mechelen as Jan Vos
- Dolf Brouwers as Sjef van Oekel/himself
- Herr Seele as Rodolfo Smit

== DVD release ==
The six episodes were released in 2008 on two DVDs, which also included the Schippers plays Going to the Dogs (1986), Sans rancune (1987), and De bruine jurk (1988).
