= Adriaan Ditvoorst =

Dutch film director

- Born: 23 January 1940; Bergen op Zoom, Netherlands
- Died: 18 October 1987 (aged 47); Bergen op Zoom, Netherlands
- Occupations: Film director Screenwriter
- Years active: 1965–1984

Adriaan Ditvoorst (23 January 1940 – 18 October 1987) was a Dutch film director and screenwriter. He directed nine films between 1965 and 1984. His 1967 film Paranoia was entered into the 17th Berlin International Film Festival.

== Selected filmography ==
- Paranoia (1967)
- Antenna (1969)
- De Mantel der Liefde (1978), a religious satire.
- De Witte Waan (1984)
