= Het is weer zo laat! =

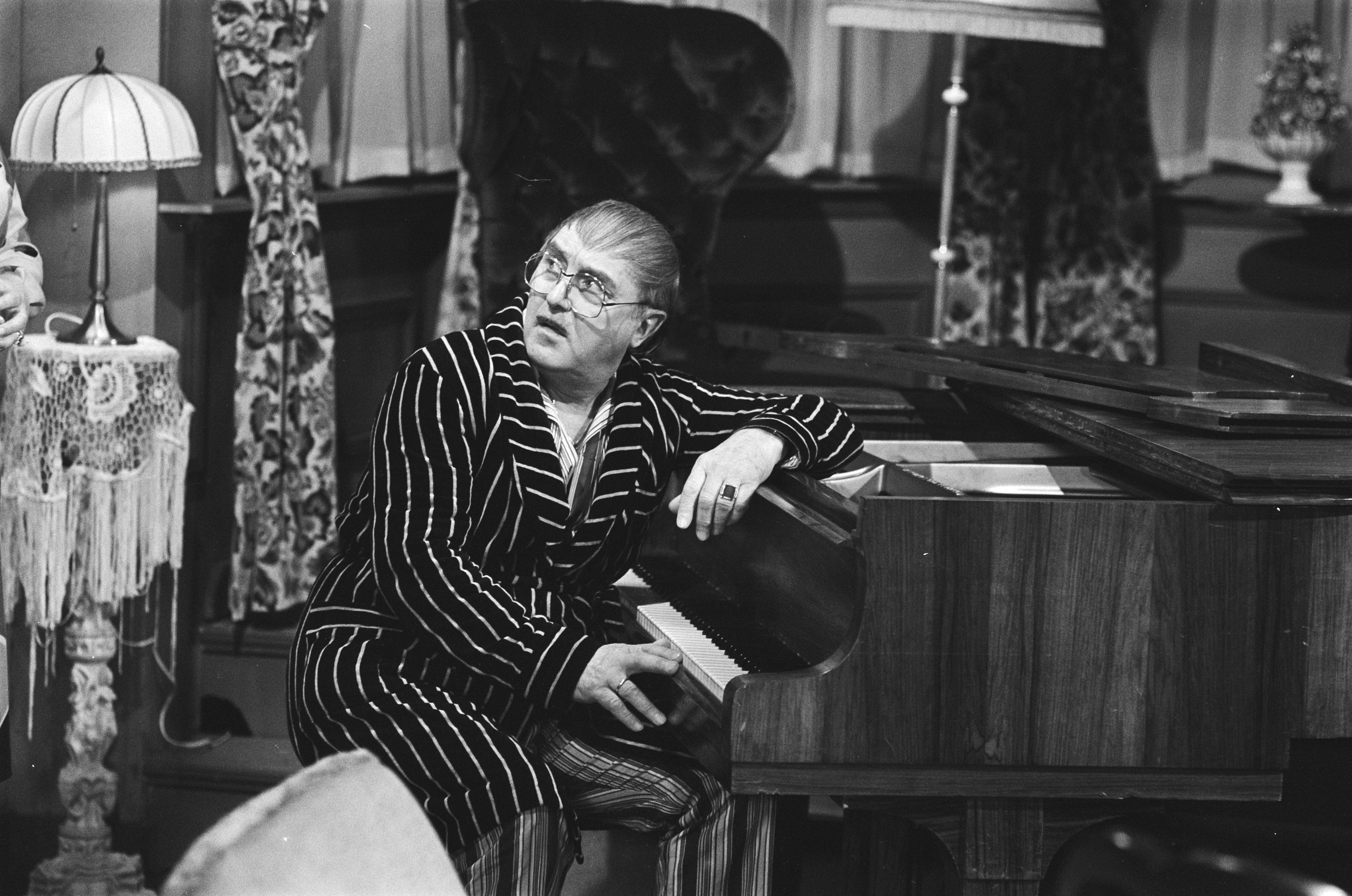
- Dolf Brouwers on the set
- Country of origin: Netherlands
- Original language: Dutch

Original release
- Network: VPRO

Het is weer zo laat! ("It's that time again!"), also known as Waldolala, is a Dutch television show from 1978, written and directed by Wim T. Schippers and co-produced by Schippers, Gied Jaspars, Wim van der Linden en Ellen Jens. It was the last TV show written for Dolf Brouwers, who had played the character Sjef van Oekel in previous shows (De Fred Hachéshow, Barend is weer bezig, and Van Oekel's Discohoek).

The show ran for ten episodes, and featured Brouwers as Waldo van Dungen, formerly a waiter at the night club Waldolala, who had acquired the club after a rich woman (Gé Braadslee, played by Mimi Kok) fell in love with him and bought the place for him. The show featured other characters from the previous shows Schippers had done for the VPRO, and shared many other characteristics—nudity, vulgarity, linguistic games (including many double entendres). The plot line and individual scenes were typically chaotic; in the end, van Dungen dies and it is revealed that the entire series of events was a kind of flashback told by van Dungen's psychiatrist.

The show's alternate name, Waldolala, was explained by Waldo van Dungen as a combination between his first name and the phrase "Oh-la-la". It was also part of the title of the theme song, a "megahit" for the girl group Luv' formed by producer Hans van Hemert, who had been commissioned to write the show's theme song. Luv' previously had two modestly successful singles with ABBA-esque songs, but Van Hemert wanted to try a different style of music. Schippers and Jaspars convinced him. Luv' performed "U.O.Me (Theme from Waldolala)" on the show, and the song became an instant hit in the Netherlands and the Flanders region of Belgium.

The show was released on DVD in 2008 as the fifth volume in the series Wim T. Schippers' Televisiepraktijken - sinds 1962; the DVD includes a clip from the NOS Journaal, 24 September 1979, on the death of Dolf Brouwers, and "Flagula" (1966), one of the Sad Movies Schippers and Van der Linden made in the 1960s.
