= Vier Jongens en een Jeep =

- Directed by: Ernst Winar
- Release date: 21 February 1955
- Running time: 70 minutes
- Country: Netherlands
- Language: Dutch

Vier Jongens en een Jeep is a 1955 Dutch film directed by Ernst Winar.

== Cast ==
- Karel Gortmaker
- Jan Kreuger
- Sylvain Poons ... Canadian uncle John
- Nico van der Put
- Dick Visser
- Ernst Winar
