= De Avonturen van Pietje Bell =

1964 film

- Directed by: Henk van der Linden
- Written by: Henk van der Linden
- Based on: Pietje Bell by Chris van Abkoude
- Produced by: Henk van der Linden
- Distributed by: Van der Linden Filmproducties
- Release date: 26 March 1964
- Running time: 85 minutes
- Country: Netherlands
- Language: Dutch

De Avonturen van Pietje Bell is a 1964 Dutch film directed by Henk van der Linden, based on the Pietje Bell books by Chris van Abkoude.

== Plot ==
Pietje Bell, the son of shoemaker Bell, is a real rascal, though he means no harm. However, his good intentions often cause a lot of trouble and provoke the anger of the neighbors and the police. Together with his best friends Peentje and Engeltje, Pietje regularly finds himself caught up in all sorts of adventures.

When Pietje and his friends go on a chicken hunt, they are caught by a police officer and taken to the police station. Fortunately, Pietje manages to talk himself and his friends out of trouble. Once back on the street, Pietje decides to start a circus, where he will shine as a great magician. Unfortunately, Pietje’s training in magic consists solely of observing a real magician, and the trick not only fails but also causes a fire. Together with Engeltje and Peentje, Pietje manages to put out the fire, but they dare not go home now. While trying to hide, they end up in an old barge. There they find all sorts of stolen goods, which belong to the burglar duo Klok and Teun. Pietje and his friends manage to overpower the two and hand them over to the police. No one mentions the fire anymore, and the three friends return home tired but satisfied.

== Cast ==
- Jeu Consten as Pietje Bell
- Cor van der Linden as Engeltje
- Hans Bost as Peentje
- No Bours as Pietje's father
- Lies Bours as Pietje's mother
- Hub Consten as policeofficer
- Frits Wenkop as Klok
- Herman Lutgerink as Teun
- Thea Eyssen as aunt Cato
- Toon van Loon as barber Wip

== Home media ==
The film was included on a bonus DVD in Tussen de filmrollen, a 2020 biographical book about director Henk van der Linden.
