= Antenna (film) =

- Directed by: Adriaan Ditvoorst
- Written by: Adriaan Ditvoorst
- Produced by: Adriaan Ditvoorst
- Starring: Pierre Clémenti
- Release date: 1969
- Running time: 40 mins
- Country: Netherlands
- Language: Dutch

Antenna is a 1970 Dutch short film, directed by Adriaan Ditvoorst and starring Pierre Clémenti.

== Plot ==
Aquarius, an eccentric and lonely artist who builds a raft, navigates it down the Scheldt River. Along the way, he discovers a Catholic monastery run by strict, conservative nuns. Due to the rigidity within the convent, sex education does not exist and individuals are oppressed by the rules of the nuns' unwavering faith and religious practices.

One of the residents is 18-year-old Antenna, who dreams of a better life of freedom outside the monastery. Together with her boyfriend, Aquarius, she decides to leave on his raft during an early-morning escape. The raft then disappears in the fog. Later, they meet a lonely hippie (resembling Jesus Christ) who lives on a farm and wants to spread love and peace to all by handing out free cannabis. The film ends in Amsterdam at the music venue Paradiso.

== Themes ==
Antenna contains many themes typical to Ditvoorst's work from the 1970s: freedom of the individual; longing for a false utopia; the lonely and misunderstood artist; aversion to state control, bureaucracy and religious authorities; and absurd characters. The film has little dialogue and is largely told through the images of cameraman Jan de Bont.

== Cast ==
- Pierre Clémenti

== Trivia ==
Ditvoorst funded the film through a grant offered by the Ministry of Culture, Recreation, and Social Work (now the Ministry of Education, Culture and Science). The film was originally supposed to be a documentary about Carnival.
