= Fietsen naar de Maan =

1963 film

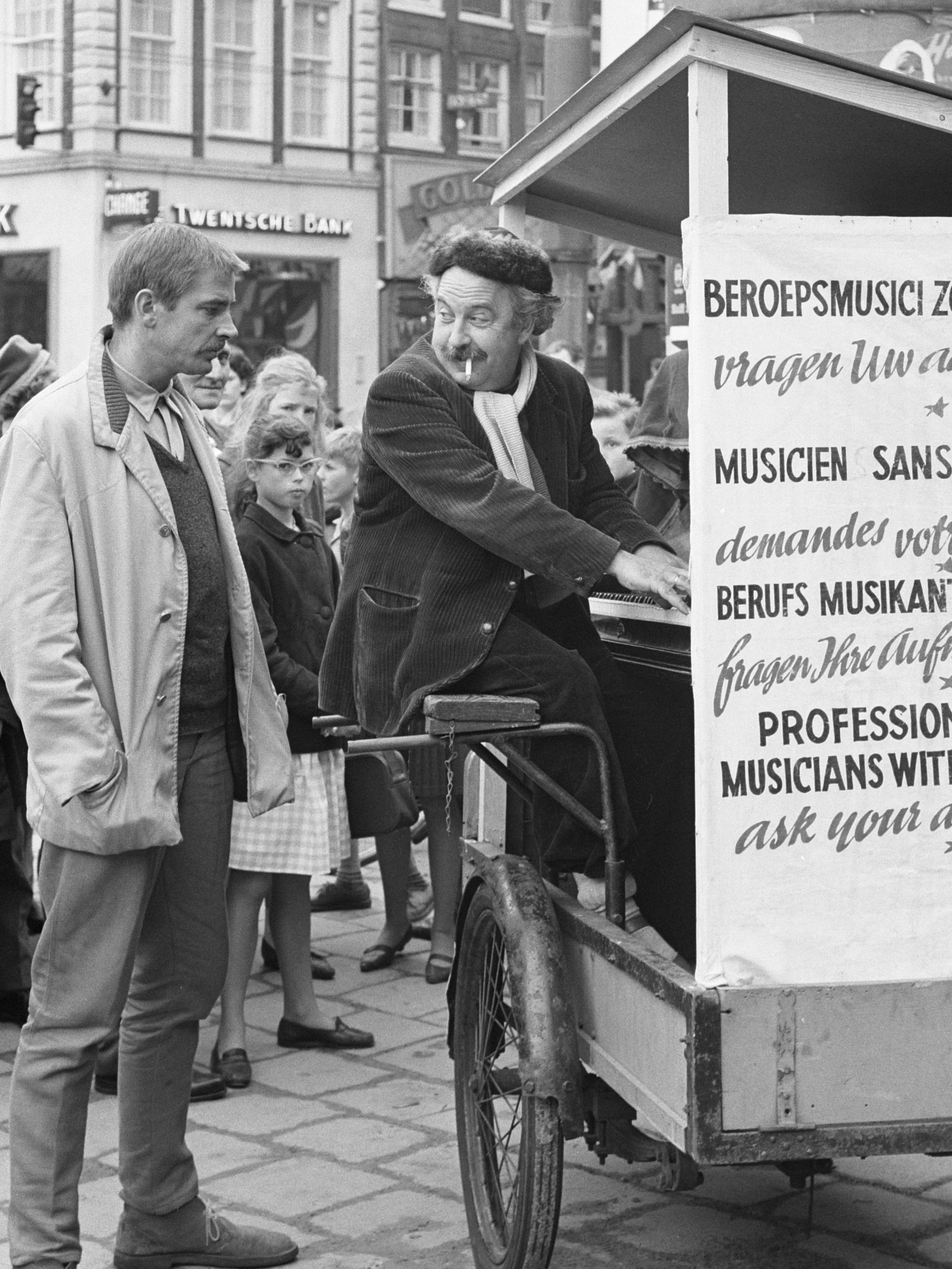
- Ton Lensink (as Evert Egmond), Lex Goudsmit (r.) as pianist
- Written by: Jef van der Heyden
- Release date: 1963
- Running time: 97 minutes
- Country: Netherlands
- Language: Dutch

Fietsen naar de Maan is a 1963 Dutch film directed by Jef van der Heyden.

It was the first movie to star Jeroen Krabbé.

The storyline concerns three brothers who have problems dealing with their father's heritage.

== Cast ==
- Johan Walhain - Dick Egmond
- Ton Lensink - Evert Egmond
- Bernhard Droog - Henk Egmond
- Michiel Kerbosch - Joost
- Ingeborg Elzevier - Wilma
