= Sjors van de Rebellenclub =

1955 film

- Directed by: Henk van der Linden
- Release date: 25 July 1955
- Running time: 90 minutes
- Country: Netherlands
- Language: Dutch

Sjors van de Rebellenclub is a 1955 Dutch adventure film directed by Henk van der Linden. It was based on the popular Dutch comic strip Sjors en Sjimmie.

== Cast ==
- Theo Niesten as Sjors
- Rinus van Loon as Sjuul
- Tonny Hassing as Wimpie
- Arno Feite as Lid
- Willem Marwa as Sjimmie
- Willie Veerwindt as Lid
- Victor Servais as De kolonel
- Dirk Capel as Pedro
- Jan Wassenaar as Boris
