= Het Geheim van de Oude Molen =

- Directed by: Henk van der Linden
- Release date: December 24, 1959
- Running time: 120 minutes
- Country: Netherlands
- Language: Dutch

Het Geheim van de Oude Molen is a 1959 Dutch film directed by Henk van der Linden.

== Cast ==
- Jos van der Linden ... Joske
- Nico Kwerreveld ... Nico
- Tonny van Schendel ... De Dikke
- Sjaak Franken ... Sjaakie
- Thea Eyssen ... Tante Marie
- Michel Odekerken ... Oom Joris
- Frits van Wenkop ... Zigeuner
- Miep Biessen ... Truus
- Hub Consten ... Makelaar Bol
- Victor Kicken ... Huurbaas
- Jessy Schmeits ... Jessy
- Jos Pyls ... Jos (as Jos Pijls)
- Wim van der Weide ... Wim
- Johnnie Custers ... Johnnie
