= Kleren Maken de Man =

- Directed by: Georg Jacoby
- Written by: Hans Gustl Kernmayr (idea), Alexander Pola (dialogue)
- Release date: 11 October 1957
- Running time: 93 minutes
- Country: Netherlands
- Language: Dutch

Kleren Maken de Man is a 1957 Dutch comedy film directed by Georg Jacoby.

== Cast ==
- Kees Brusse ... Verzekeringsagent Hans
- Annet Nieuwenhuyzen ... Ellen
- Mimi Boesnach ... Burgerjuffrouw
- Andrea Domburg ... Voormalige vriendin Peter
- Johan Kaart ... Speurder
- Rijk de Gooyer ... Peter
- Guus Oster
- Jan Retèl
- Cees Laseur
- Cruys Voorbergh
- Hans Tiemeyer
- Leo de Hartogh
