= Cornelis Johannes Kieviet =

Dutch writer

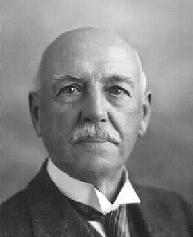
- Born: 8 March 1858; Hoofddorp, Netherlands
- Died: 12 August 1931 (aged 73); Wassenaar, Netherlands
- Occupations: Writer, illustrator
- Writing career
- Genre: Children's picture books
- Notable work: Dik Trom

Cornelis Johannes Kieviet (8 March 1858 – 12 August 1931) was a Dutch teacher and writer of children's literature. He was born in Hoofddorp and is best known for his stories about a boy named Dik Trom. A statue of Dik Trom sitting backwards on a donkey can be found in the main square in Hoofddorp.
