= Myrte of the Demons =

Myrte en de Demonen
- Directed by: Paulbruno Schreiber
- Written by: Paul Bruno Schreiber
- Produced by: Bert Haanstra
- Cinematography: Bert Haanstra
- Music by: Marinus Adam
- Release date: 17 May 1950
- Running time: 88 minutes
- Country: Netherlands
- Language: Dutch

Myrte of the Demons or Myrte en de Demonen is a 1950 Dutch film directed by Paul Bruno Schreiber.

Myrte en de demonen is the first Dutch fairy tale film after the Second World War, produced between 1946 and 1950 by the European Art Union of the German director Paul Bruno Schreiber. The camera work is by Bert Haanstra and Dirk de Herder

== Story ==
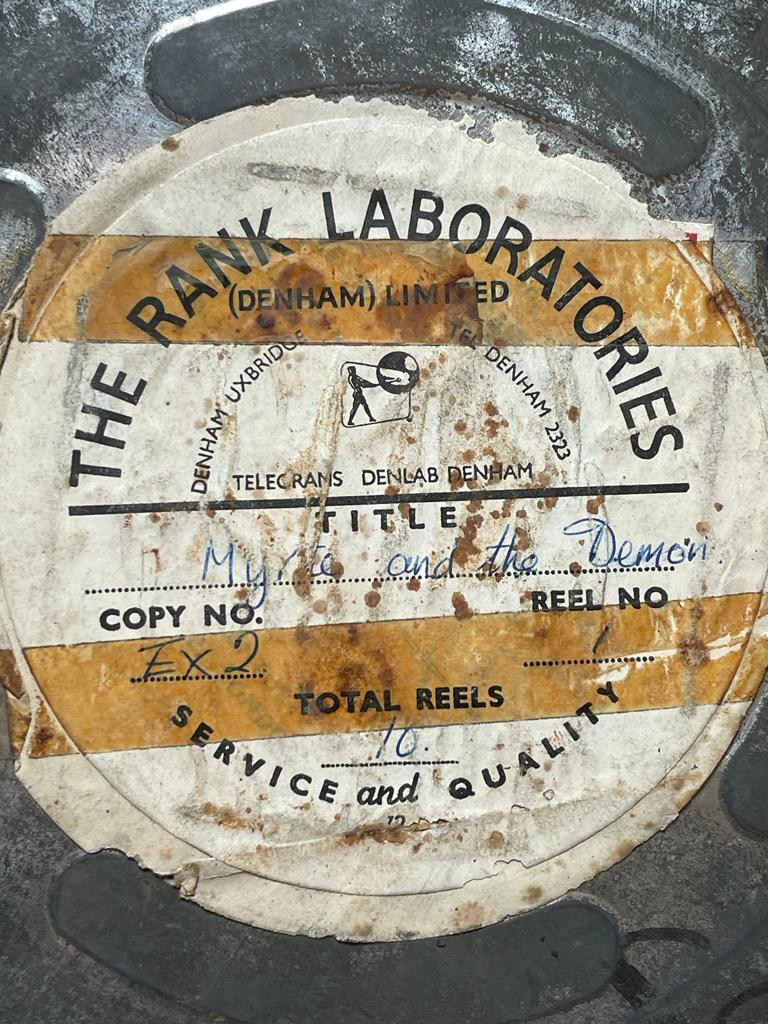

The story is mythological and based on the battle between good and evil. The film symbolically expresses the struggle between light and darkness, good and evil. Myrte is played by Paulida Weggelaar.

The demons are jealous of the cheerful Myrte. Horribos, the wizard turns her dolls and animals into stones. The demons take on human forms from midnight to dawn. At that time they try to get Myrte under their control by extinguishing the candle, which was given to her by a good meadow spirit for protection. Two dwarfs (Bokkel and Nokkel) and also the moon come to her aid.

Through her innocence she finally overcomes the evil intentions of the demons, so that they even come to her aid when the witch is after Myrte. Myrte makes friends with the princess, who wanted to kill her rabbit out of jealousy and is injured herself as a result, after which the princess (Tuuk) can die in peace.

Dawn breaks, the moon leaves for the sky, and the demons must also disappear.

The spell is broken.

== Background ==
The film is based on the book of the same name Myrte en de demonen, written by Paul Schreiber. For Bert Haanstra it was his first assignment as a cameraman for a feature film.[4] Dirk de Herder was his assistant. The recordings were made at the estate Huis te Manpad in Heemstede. The film has been dubbed into Dutch (Voice: Doreen Buckner) in Great Britain and was originally spoken in English. Marinus Adam (conductor-composer of the North Holland Philharmonic Orchestra) was responsible for the music performed by the London Philharmonic Orchestra, Helene Ludolph and The Wardour Singers. The musical theme recurs throughout the film. D.A. Boer was the recording director and Studio Manpad was responsible for the set design. Miss Alpha. Bigot fabricated the puppets and masks. The fa. Michels (Karel Bronkhorst) took care of the grimace. On May 14, 1948, a silent working copy was previewed in the Building for Arts and Sciences (The Hague). The preview was musically illustrated by the Haarlemse Orkest Vereniging (H.O.V.) (later Noordhollands Philharmonisch Orkest) conducted by the composer with the participation of Helene Ludolph and the boys' choir "De Liduina Boys". The Dutch premiere took place on March 17, 1950, in the Cultura theater (now: Cinetol) in Amsterdam. The film was taken out of circulation after a week in Cultura and a week in theater De Uitkijk (Amsterdam). For Bert Haanstra it was his first assignment as a cameraman for a feature film. Dirk de Herder was his assistant. The recordings were made at the estate Huis te Manpad in Heemstede. The film has been dubbed into Dutch (Voice: Doreen Buckner) in Great Britain and was originally spoken in English. Marinus Adam (conductor-composer of the North Holland Philharmonic Orchestra) was responsible for the music performed by the London Philharmonic Orchestra, Helene Ludolph and The Wardour Singers. The musical theme recurs throughout the film. D.A. Boer was the recording director and Studio Manpad was responsible for the set design. Miss Alpha. Bigot fabricated the puppets and masks. The fa. Michels (Karel Bronkhorst) took care of the grimace. On May 14, 1948, a silent working copy was previewed in the Building for Arts and Sciences (The Hague). The preview was musically illustrated by the Haarlemse Orkest Vereniging (H.O.V.) (later Noordhollands Philharmonisch Orkest) conducted by the composer with the participation of Helene Ludolph and the boys' choir "De Liduina Boys". The Dutch premiere took place on March 17, 1950, in the Cultura theater (now: Cinetol) in Amsterdam. The film was taken out of circulation after a week in Cultura and a week in theater De Uitkijk (Amsterdam).

== Cast ==
- Paulida Weggelaar Schreiber - Myrte
- Harry Berg - Menelak
- Ludzer Eringa ... The Moon
- Sonia Gables - pinces Tuuk
- Kees Kick - Nokkel
- Dick Versluis - Bokkel
- Johan Mittertreiner - Kromlak
- Jan Musch - Paperlak
- Mascha ter Weeme - Witch
- Sonja Mabel Jap Tjong - Princess Tuuk
- Marie Jeanne van der Veen - Ballerina
- Theo van Vliet - Horribos

== Trivia ==
- The entire film was shot outdoors, mainly in the early evening and night.
- The book edition of the same name was published in 1948, with illustrations by Rie Reinderhoff.
- The film was shown for a week in June 2017 at Filmtheater Kriterion in Amsterdam
- Originally the film was black and white, part of the film was later converted to color. Spirit color (S.C.O.R.P. = Spirit Color Optical Reduction Process) Spirit color.
- The film was shot in 35mm and later digitized (YouTube).
- Post-syncing and dubbing: Denham Film Studios Denham-Pinewood Studios). J.A. Rank, England English dialogue: Gyles Adams. English Speakers: Richard Walter, John Bailey, Alec Finter, Richard George, Hugh Buckner, David Page, and Doreen Buckner (Myrte)
- Both the original "Dreh-Buch" Musik (German) and the screenplay are owned by the Schreiber heirs and are archived in Schloss Möhren, Bavaria, Germany.
- Confusion: Both the book and the movie Myrtle and the Demons are often thought to be for children. This is a misconception. Myrtle and the Demons is a fairy tale for adults.

== Reviews ==
- Dr. Roger Mavell (Sight and Sound, zomer 1949 - director of the British Film Academy) "There are few enough films with the atmospheric qualities of MYRTE AND THE DEMONS, and Paulbruno Schreiber might well make a number of subjects of this kind on a modest budget which would bring back fantasy to a medium that in recent years has almost forgotten it." - Sight and Sound - Summer 1949 Vol. 18 No. 70 - published by the British Film institute - Roger Manvell
- LJ Jordaan (Vrij Nederland, March 1950) "..surprisingly beautiful photography, a sample of good taste and craftsmanship, which is not inferior to the best foreign performances and the entire mise-en-scene, including the suggestive demon masks, bears witness to a skill and insight that one would not easily expect in an occasional production such as the Dutch. In short: the film thus became a feast for the eyes."
- Hans Alma (Zwolse Courant, March 1956) „..in my opinion this is the best feature film that has been made so far within our borders - the first half hour is downright masterful: Myrte's play in the sun with her dog, goat and rabbits watched by demons in the forest edge. The demons are fascinating creepy puppets that only make a few movements, but which, partly due to the catchy music, emanate an enormous suggestion... It is difficult to put into words, but this first phase of the film is very, very beautiful, moving and above all cinematic through and through. – Schreiber's direction and editing, his daughter's delicate acting, Haanstra's camera work, and last but not least, the music by Marinus Adam (conductor of the H.o.V.), all of that is admirable.”
- Hans-Günther Staudenmayer: Quote from correspondence, Weissenburg, 14.09.1965. (hage-Filmkunst Television-Filmproduktion) ".....Die Musik ist so bezauberend, dass man das Ganze als künstlerisch ungemein feinfühlige Interpretation eines musikalischen Märchenoratoriums auffassen könnte. Sebst beim ersten Anhören entgehen dem aufmerksam Lauschenden nicht die subtilen Feinheiten der Instrumentation wie sie bisher keine uns bekannte Filmmusik aufwies...". English: The music is so enchanting that one could see the whole thing as an artistically extremely sensitive interpretation of a musical fairy tale oratorio. Even when listening for the first time, the attentive listener will not miss the subtleties of the instrumentation, which no film music known to us has shown before...".
