= We zijn weer thuis =

Dutch television series

- Country of origin: Netherlands
- Original language: Dutch

Original release
- Network: VPRO

We zijn weer thuis (Back home again) is a Dutch dramady-series broadcast by VPRO from 1989 to 1994. It was written by Wim T. Schippers and co-directed with Ellen Jens as his swansong-series for VPRO. The series was released on dvd in October 2007; nostalgia-channel Best 24 first started reruns in 2010.

== Content ==
Central characters in the show are Nel van der Hoed-Smulders, a wealthy widow who lives in a villa in the Gooi, and her three sons. Simon Raaspit, Govert Zwanenpark and Thijs van der Hoed are fathered by three different men; Thijs is the only legitimate son and therefore unconditionally entitled to his share of the 4 million heritage (one million each). Simon and Govert only get theirs if they continue to live at home or marry an approved girl.

- Simon, a journalist in his thirties, is fond of wordplays and chasing after women; a pastime shared with notary Henk van der Born who keeps an eye on the family fortune in a most peculiar way. Simon first meets his father Jacob Raaspit when he is in the hospital after a suicide attempt. Soon afterwards Simon appears to have a teenage son.
- Govert tries to set up a computer-business but seems to be surrounded by the wrong people. According to legend, Govert's Aruban father Edu Zwanenpark drowned shortly after making Nel pregnant; he returns as a businessman taking with him his second-born son Lesley.
- Thijs, twelve years Simon's junior, was eight when his father Karel van der Hoed dropped dead in front of the birthday-cake. Thijs was made the owner of the house to prevent eviction. He could've moved out, but chose not to because of his immaturity. Thijs spends his time eating, falling victim to older men fancying young boys and pursuing passing interests. For instance, he joins Jehova's Witnesses which helps him bedding a female convert.

Usually Schippers' characters lose their faith, and like all his shows We zijn weer thuis pokes fun at all-too serious attitudes and relishes wordplay. Wordplay often consists in taking metaphorical expressions literally, and the linguistic jokery often placed high demand on the actors. Walter Crommelin, for instance, who played Uncle Gerard, complained that text such as "Tegen de tijd dat Tineke terug is van haar Tibetaanse tarbeinenjacht en thallofytentoernee door de Transhimalajaanse hoogvlakte, om hier met die halfgare hageprekende holistische haaibaai hier weer de boel onveilig te komen maken..." seriously interfered with acting naturally.

== Cast and production ==
- Truus Dekker - Nel van der Hoed-Smulders
- Wim T. Schippers - Simon Raaspit
- Kenneth Herdigein - Govert Zwanenpark
- Dick van den Toorn - Thijs van der Hoed
- Walter Crommelin - Gerard Smulders
- Mimi Kok - Mathilde van Setten-van der Kaap
- Ellen Ten Damme - Bente Jaarsveld
- Wim T. Schippers - writer, director
- Ellen Jens - director

Posters were designed by Piet Schreuders, and financial support for the show came from the Mediafonds.

== DVD release ==
The series was released in 2008 as volume 2 (an 8-DVD box) of Wim T. Schippers' Televisiepraktijken - sinds 1962.
