= Plafond over de vloer =

- Country of origin: Netherlands
- Original language: Dutch

Original release
- Network: VPRO

Plafond over de vloer is a Dutch television show in nine episodes, aired in 1986 by the VPRO and written and directed by Wim T. Schippers. It derives from the radio show Ronflonflon, and its main character is that show's host, Jacques Plafond.

== DVD release ==
The show was released on DVD as the sixth volume of the series Wim T. Schippers' Televisiepraktijken - sinds 1962, the second disc of a box also containing Hoepla (1967), the first television by Wim T. Schippers, with Wim van der Linden, Willem de Ridder, and Hans Verhagen.
