= List of people from Lviv =

The following is a list of notable people from the city of Lviv (Polish: Lwów; German: Lemberg).

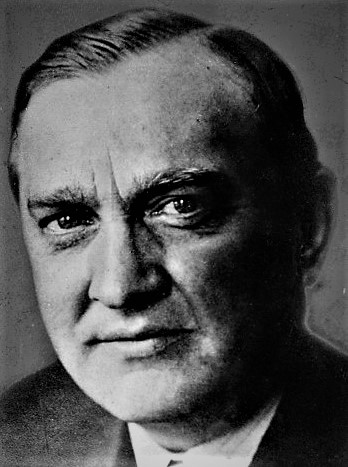
Stefan Banach

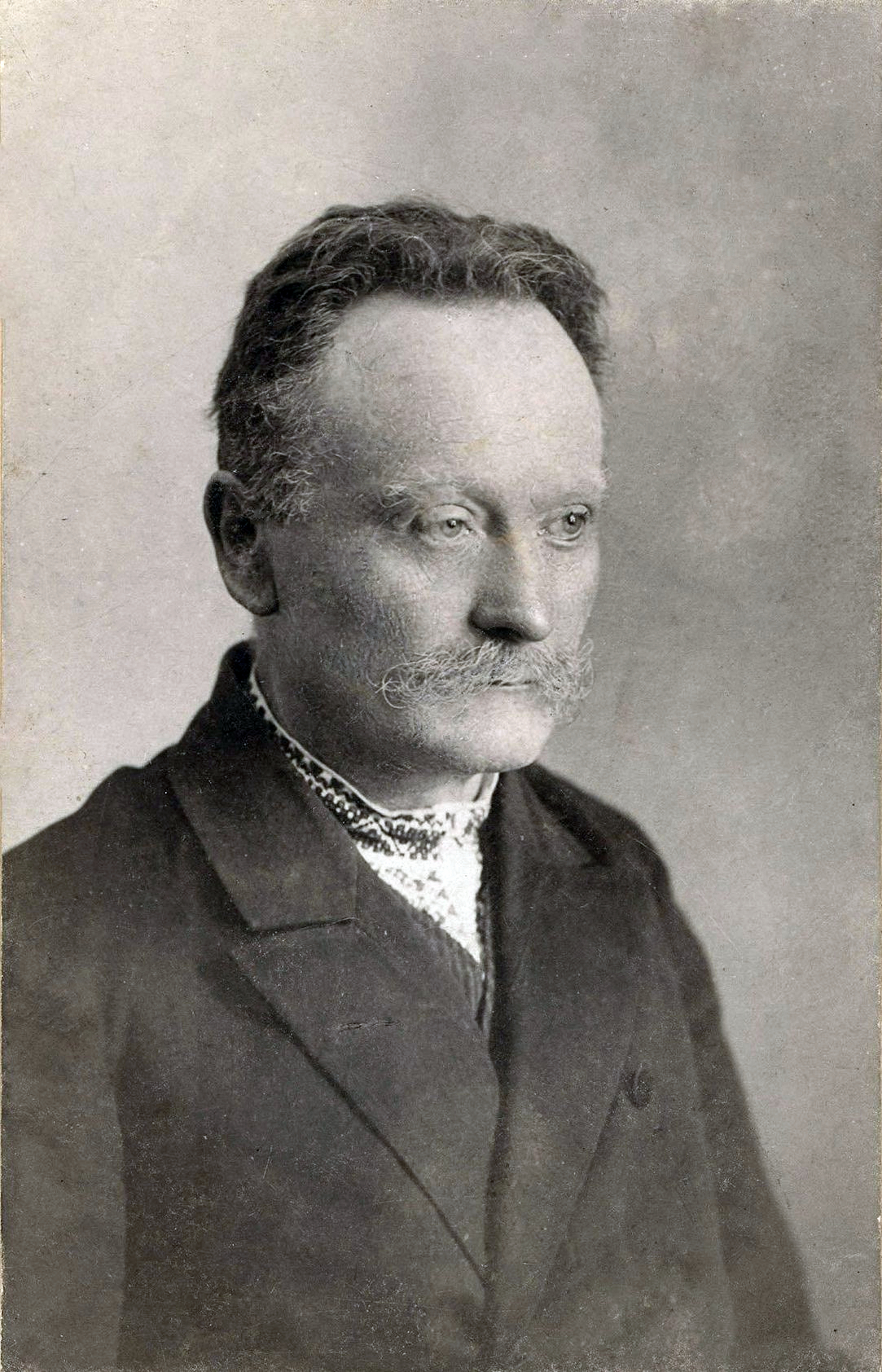
Ivan Franko

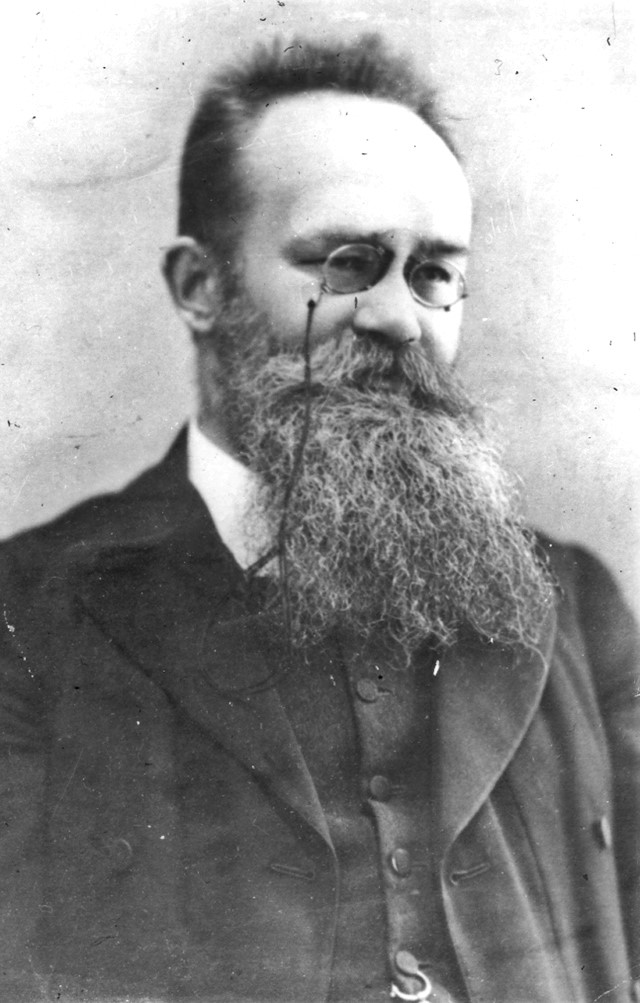
Mykhailo Hrushevsky

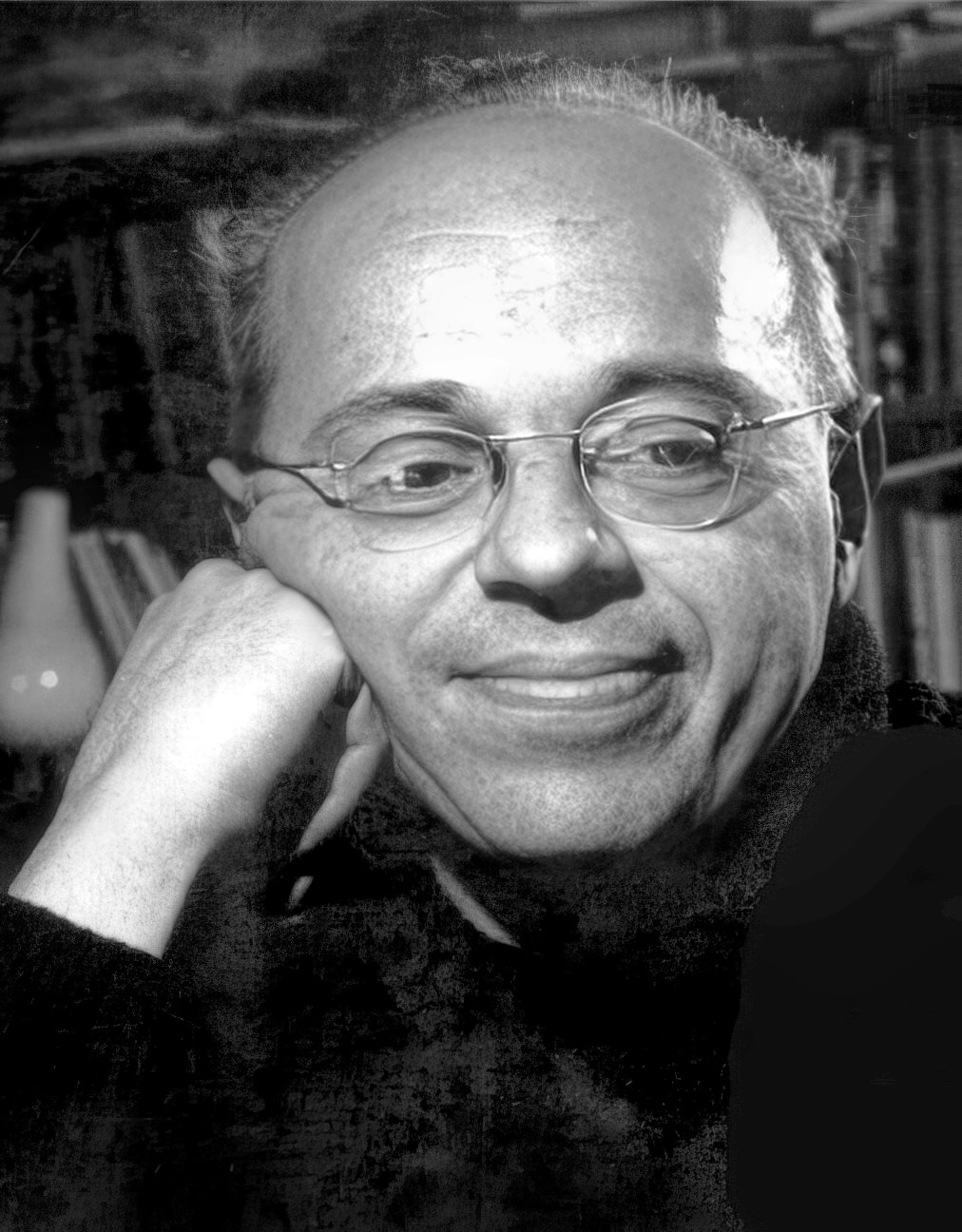
Stanisław Lem

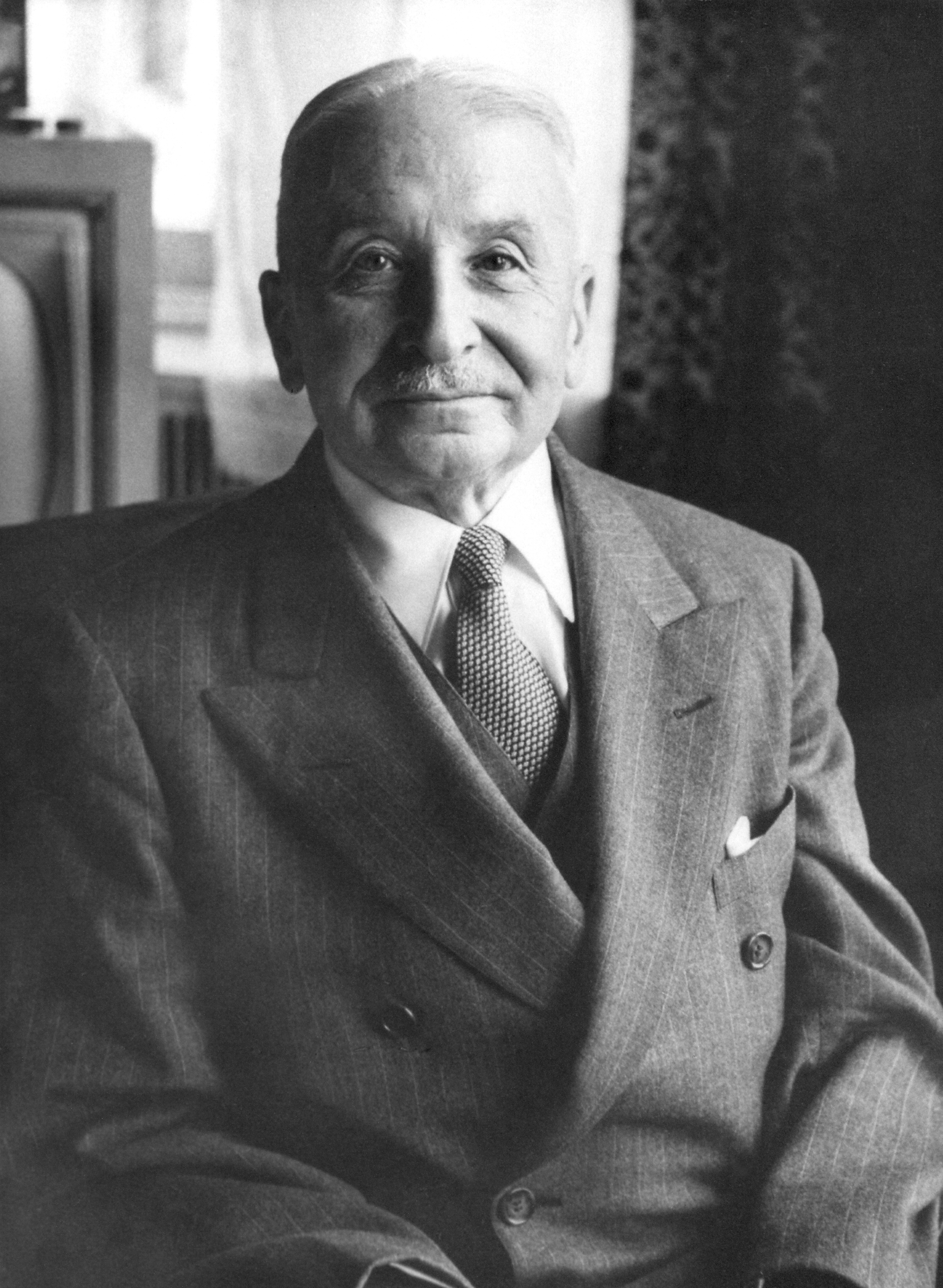
Ludwig von Mises

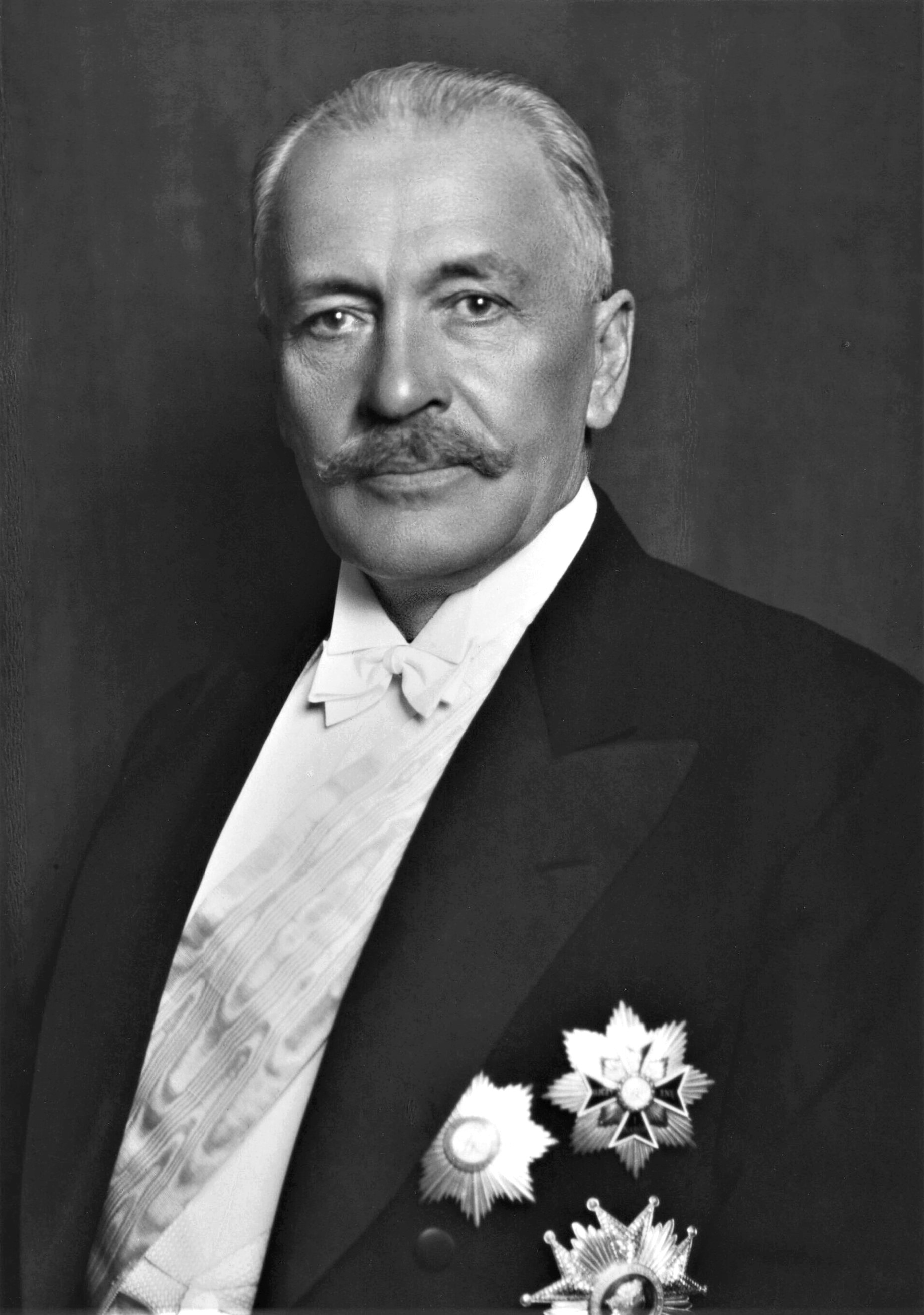
Ignacy Mościcki

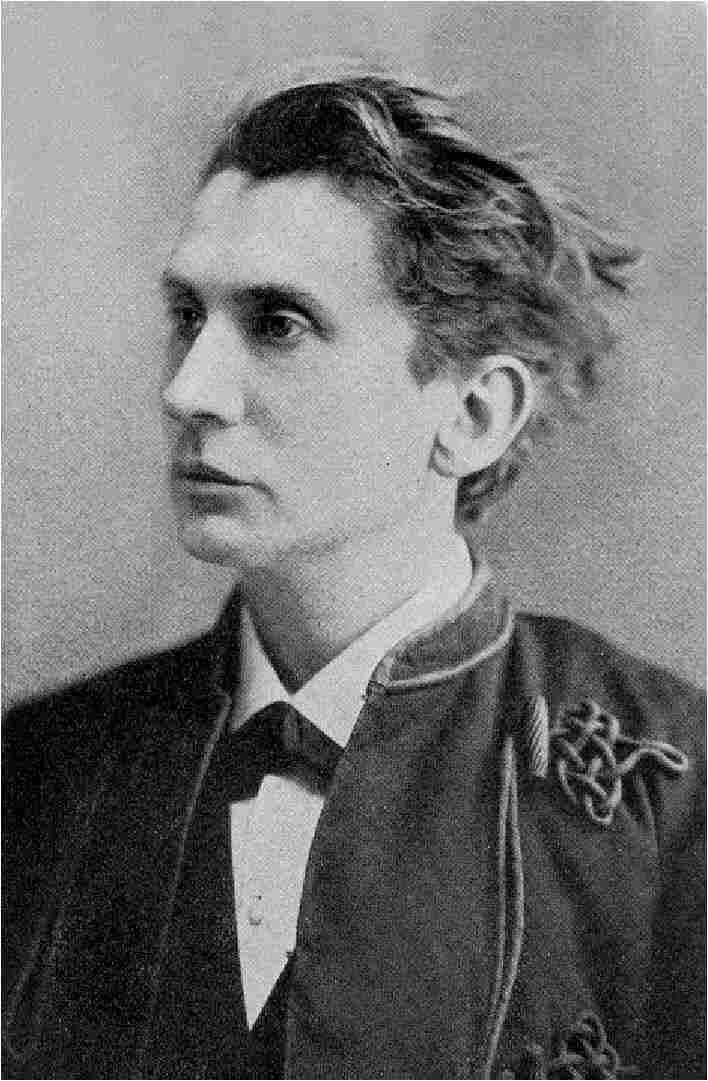
Leopold von Sacher-Masoch

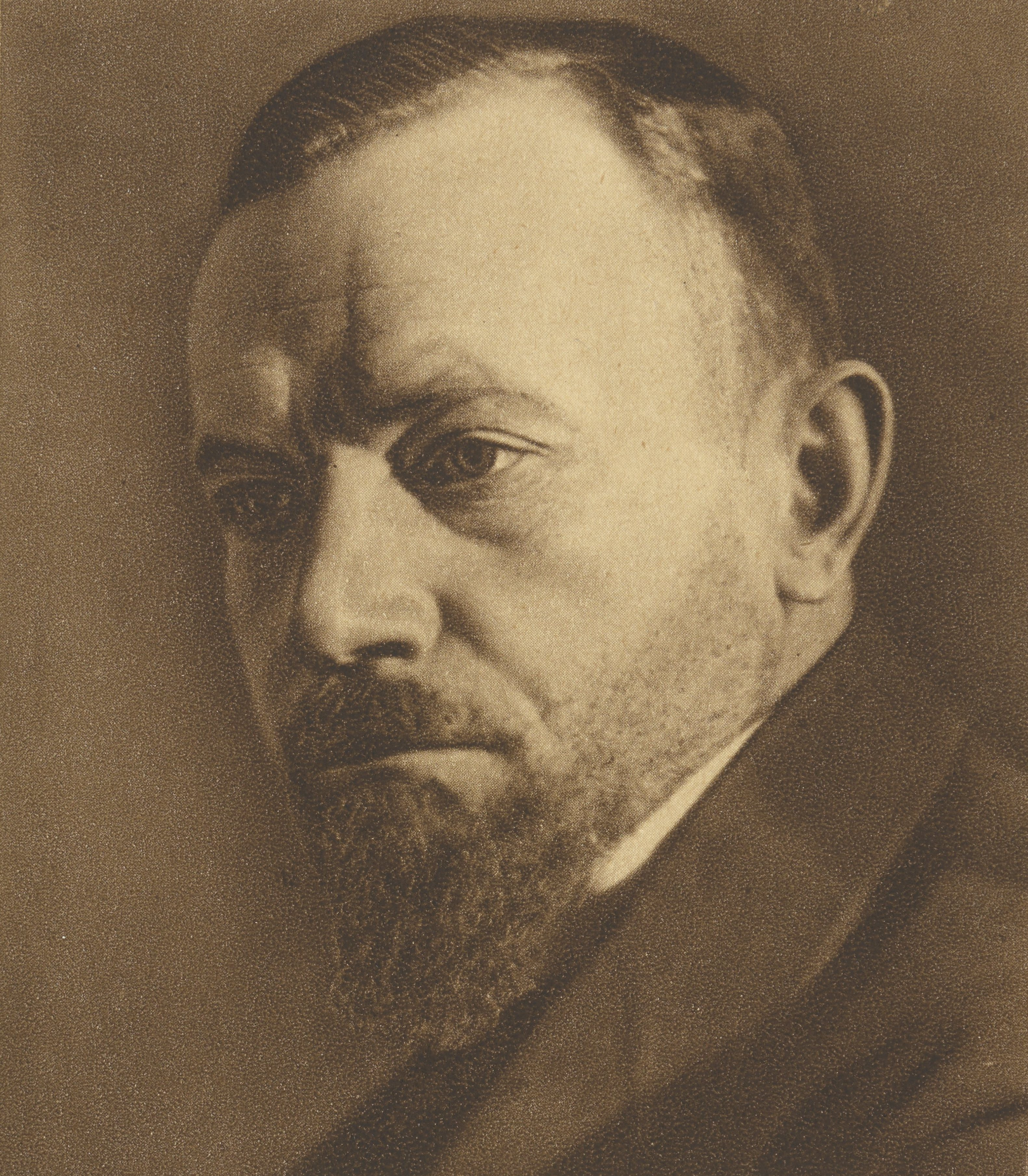
Leopold Staff

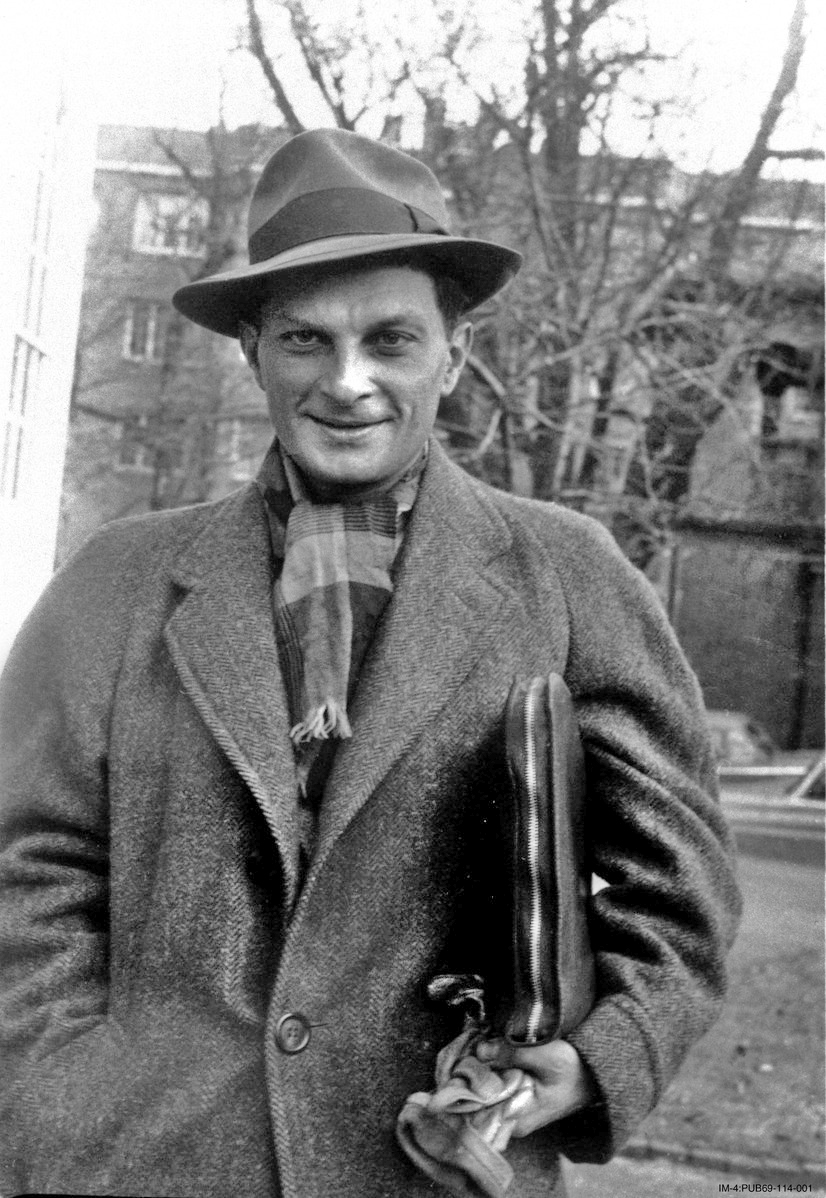
Stanisław Ulam

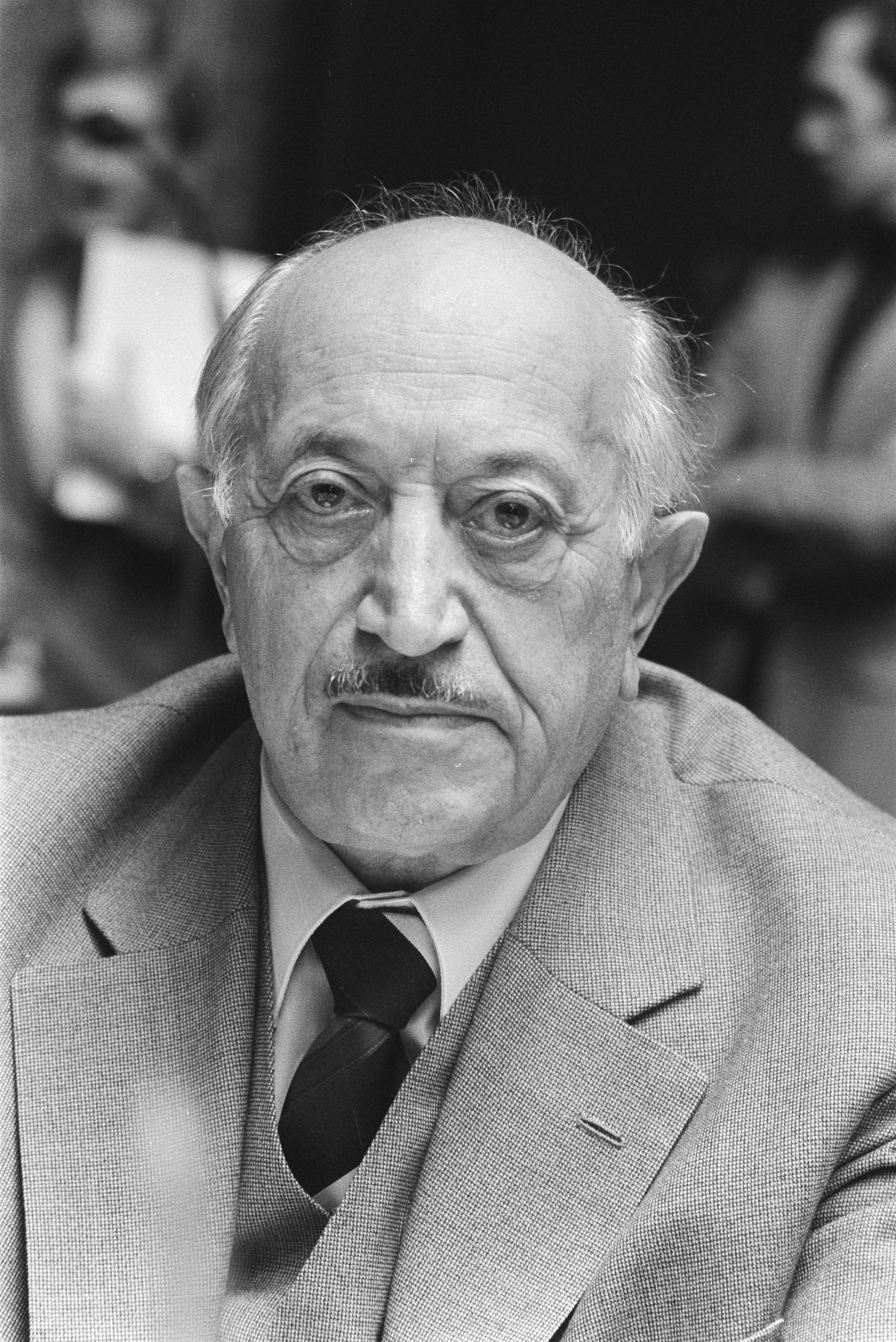
Simon Wiesenthal

== A ==
- Maria Abashova (born 1983), Russian ballet dancer
- Roman Abraham (1891–1976), general of the Polish army
- Kazimierz Ajdukiewicz (1890–1963), Polish logician and philosopher
- Spirydion Albański (1907–1992), Polish football goalkeeper of the Poland National Team
- Zofia Albinowska-Minkiewiczowa (1886–1971), Polish painter
- Stanislaw Albinowski (1923–2005), Polish economist, columnist and journalist
- Bohdan Ihor Antonych (1909–1937), Ukrainian poet
- Pavlo Arie (born 1977), Ukrainian screenwriter and playwright
- Muhammad Asad (1900–1992), Austro-Hungarian Pakistani translator of Quran into English (born in Lemberg as Leopold Weiss)
- Stefan Askenase (1896–1985), Polish-Belgian pianist
- Szymon Askenazy (1865–1935), Polish-Jewish historian and politician, founder of the Lwów-Warsaw historical school
- Herman Auerbach (1901–1942), Polish mathematician
- Emanuel Ax (born 1949), Polish-American pianist
- Teodor Axentowicz (1859–1938), Polish-Armenian painter
- Erwin Axer (1917–2012), Polish actor and theatre professor

== B ==
- Oswald Balzer (1858–1933), law historian, rector of the Lwów University (1895–1896), founder of the Society for Support of Polish Science in Lwów (Tow. dla Popierania Nauki Pol. we Lwowie), the first scientific organisation in the city
- Stefan Banach (1892–1945), mathematician
- Yuri Bashmet (born 1953), viola soloist
- Kazimierz Bartel (1882–1941), mathematician and politician, prime minister of Poland (1926–1930)
- Adolf Beck (1863–1942), physiologist
- Joseph Beer (1908–1987), composer
- Alexander Beliavsky (born 1953), chess grandmaster
- Józef Bem (1794–1850), Polish and Hungarian national hero
- Saint Józef Bilczewski (1860–1923), Archbishop of Lviv and a Catholic saint
- Szymon Okolski (1580–1653), a historian, specialist in heraldry, provincial of the Dominican Order
- Fabian Birkowski (1566–1636), writer, preacher
- Wojciech Bobowski (1610–1675), dragoman and musician in the Ottoman Empire, translated the Bible into Ottoman Turkish
- Wojciech Bogusławski (1757–1829), composer
- Tadeusz Bór-Komorowski (1895–1966), general of the Polish army, commander-in-chief of the Home Army
- Mieczysław Boruta-Spiechowicz (1894–1985), general of the Polish army
- Naftali Botwin (1905–1925), political militant and labor activist
- Michał Boym (ca. 1612–1659), Jesuit missionary in China, known for his travels and writings
- Heinrich Gottfried von Bretschneider (1739–1810), German satirical writer
- Julia Brystiger (1902–1975), political militant, member of the security apparatus of the Polish People's Republic
- Jan Brzoza (1900–1971), writer, publicist
- Martin Buber (1878–1965), philosopher
- Sofiia Burak (1961–2016), artist of artistic textiles, graphic artist
- Solomon Buber (1827–1906), banker and philosopher

== C ==
- Leopold Caro (1864–1939), economist and lawyer
- Emmanuil Chekalyuk (1909–1990), petroleum engineer
- Viacheslav Chornovil (1937–1999), politician
- Taras Chubay (born 1970), leader of Ukrainian rock band Plach Yeremiji
- Jan Czekanowski (1882–1965), anthropologist
- Anna Czekanowska-Kuklińska (1929–2021), musicologist and ethnographer
- Eugeniusz Czerwiński (1887–1930), Polish architect

== D ==
- Danylo of Halych (1201–1264), 1st King of Galicia, founder of city
- Andrzej Dobrowolski (1921–1990), composer
- Hryhoriy Dolenko (1917–1990), petroleum geologist, academician
- Yaroslav Derega (born 1956), linguist

== E ==
- Max Ettinger (1874–1951), composer

== F ==
- Iryna Farion (1964–2024), Ukrainian linguist and nationalist politician
- Ludwik Fleck (1896–1961), biologist
- Aleksander Ford (1908–1980), film director
- Ivan Franko (1856–1916), poet and linguist, reformer of the Ukrainian language
- Mikhail Fridman (born 1964), Russian oligarch
- Filip Friedman (1901–1960), Holocaust researcher
- Ivan Fedorov (born c. 1510 or c. 1525–1583, founder of book printing in Russia and Ukraine
- Count Aleksander Fredro (1793–1876), comedy writer

== G ==
- Mieczysław Gębarowicz (1893–1984), scientist and art historian, director of the Ossolineum Institute during World War II
- Nathan Michael Gelber (1891–1966), historian
- Eugeniusz Geppert (1890–1979), painter
- Franciszek Ksawery Godebski (1801–1869), director of the Ossolineum and father to Cyprian Godebski, renowned sculptor
- Julian Godlewski (1903–1983), businessman and philanthropist
- Maksymilian Goldstein (1880–1942), a pre-war Judaica collector, director of the Lviv Jewish Museum, and owner of a privately maintained museum
- Georgiy R. Gongadze (1969–2000), journalist kidnapped and murdered in 2000
- Zygmunt Gorgolewski (1845–1903), architect, constructor of the Grand Theatre in Lwów (currently the Lviv Theatre of Opera and Ballet)
- Kazimierz Górski (1921–2006), football coach
- Uri Zvi Greenberg (1896–1981), poet
- Artur Grottger (1837–1867), late romanticist painter

== H ==
- Yaroslav Halan (1902–1949), anti-fascist playwright and publicist
- Bernard Hausner (1874–1938), rabbi, diplomat and member of the Sejm
- Gideon Hausner (1915–1990), Israeli jurist, politician, Attorney General of Israel and prosecutors at the war crimes trial of Adolf Eichmann in Jerusalem
- Marian Hemar (1901–1972), poet, journalist, playwright, comedy writer, and songwriter
- Zbigniew Herbert (1924–1998), poet
- Mykhailo Hrushevsky (1866–1934), first president of the Ukrainian People's Republic
- Lyubomyr Huzar (1933–2017), Cardinal, head of the Ukrainian Greek Catholic Church
- Mieczyslaw Horszowski (1892–1993), Polish and American pianist
- Stepan Hiha (1959-2025), Ukraine composer, singer and an associate professor
- Andriyan Hutnyk (b. 1968), politician and sports executive

== I ==
- Abraham Eliezer Eliyahu Ha-Levi Igel (1825–1892), Modern Orthodox rabbi, chief rabbi of Czernowitz and Bukovina
- Vasyl Ivanchuk (born 1969), chess grandmaster
- Volodymyr Ivasyuk (1949–1979), composer
- Danylo Ishutin (born 1989), professional Dota 2 esports player, affiliated with the team Natus Vincere

== K ==
- Stanisław Kaczor-Batowski (1866–1946), painter
- Bertha Kalich (1874–1939), actress
- Vera Kamsha (born 1962), fantasy writer
- Michał Karaszewicz-Tokarzewski (1893–1964), general
- Stanisław Kasznica (1908–1948), resistance soldier
- Wojciech Kilar (1932–2013), composer
- Lubka Kolessa (1902–1997), pianist
- Yevhen Konovalets (1891–1938), Ukrainian nationalist leader
- Maria Konopnicka (1842–1910), writer
- Ihor Kobrin (1951–2023), film director
- Juliusz Kossak (1824–1899), painter
- Ihor Kozhan (born 1953), Ukrainian archivist, cultural and public figure
- Jan Krukowiecki (1772–1850), general
- Solomiya Krushelnytska (1872–1952), opera singer
- Tadeusz Krwawicz (1910–1988), ophthalmologist
- Jerzy Kulczycki (1931–2013), civil engineer and activist publisher and bookseller
- Jacek Kuroń (1934–2004), freedom fighter and politician (Solidarity, KOR)
- Vilém Kurz (1872–1945), pianist, professor at the Lwów State Conservatory
- Ilona Kurzowa (1899–1975), pianist
- Nadiia Kushnir (born 1993), illustrator, designer, comic artist
- Wacław Kuchar (1897–1981), talented athlete, multiple champion of Poland in various sports

== L ==
- Stanisław Jerzy Lec (1909–1966), poet and aphorist
- Stanisław Lem (1921–2006), science fiction writer and futurist
- Stanisław Leśniewski (1886–1939), philosopher and logician
- Stanisław I Leszczyński (1677–1766), twice King of Poland.
- Antoni Łomnicki (1881–1941), mathematician
- Roman Longchamps de Bérier (1883–1941), lawyer, last rector of the Jan Kazimierz University
- Alfred J. Lotka (1880–1949), mathematician, physical chemist, statistician, biophysicist, author of predator-prey model
- Ignacy Łukasiewicz (1822–1882), engineer, pioneer of oil industry
- Jan Łukasiewicz (1878–1956), philosopher and logician
- Oleh Luzhnyi (born 1968), former professional footballer

== M ==
- Stanisław Maczek (1892–1994), Polish World War II general, Commander Allied (Polish) 1st Armoured Division in Western Europe
- Kornel Makuszyński (1884–1953), writer of books for children
- Oksana Maksymchuk (born 1982), Ukrainian poet
- Michael Malice (born 1976), Author, political commentator, Anarchist
- Alexandra Marinina (born 1957), Russian writer of detective stories
- Kostyantyn Markovych (born 1968), painter, iconographer, graphic artist
- Leopold von Sacher-Masoch (1836–1895), writer, author of Venus in Furs
- Stanisław Mieczysław Mazur (1905–1981), mathematician, member of the Polish Academy of Sciences and the Lwów School of Mathematics
- Kazimierz Michałowski, Egyptologist (1901–1981), founder of Nubiology
- Ludwig von Mises (1881–1973), free-market economist (born in Lemberg)
- Richard von Mises (1883–1953), mathematician (younger brother of Ludwig, also born in Lemberg)
- Izydor Modelski (1889–1962), Polish Lieutenant General and spy
- Iryna Morykvas (born 1985), Ukrainian illustrator, artist, writer
- Sigmund Mogulesko (1858–1914), Yiddish singer and actor
- Ignacy Mościcki (1867–1946), chemist and President of Poland (1926–1939)
- Andrzej Mostowski (1913–1975), mathematician
- Gabriela Moyseowicz (born 1944), composer and pianist
- Paul Muni (1895–1967), actor
- Ana Muzičuk (born 1990), chess grandmaster
- Vitaly Mansky (born 1963), film director

== N ==
- Joseph Saul Nathanson (1808–1875), leading rabbinical authority of the 19th century
- Joanna Nittenberg (born 1942), journalist

== O ==
- Aaron ha-Levi Oettingen, Eighteenth century Galician rabbi
- Janusz Onyszkiewicz (born 1937), politician, Vice President of the European Parliament
- Stanisław Ostrowski (1892–1982), Polish politician, best known for serving as the last Polish Mayor of Lwów and third President of Poland in exile.

== P ==
- Jan Parandowski (1895–1978), writer
- Jakub Karol Parnas (1884–1949), biochemist
- Teodor Parnicki (1908–1988), historian
- Aniela Pawlikowska (1901–1980), painter
- Aaron ben Phinehas, member of rabbinical college of Lemberg
- Leon Piniński (1857–1938), politician, lawyer and art historian
- Andriy Protsyk (born 1986), footballer
- Wojciech Pszoniak (1942–2020), actor
- Witold Pyrkosz (1926–2017), Polish actor

== R ==
- Karl Radek (1885–1939), international Communist figure
- Samuel Judah Löb Rapoport (1790–1867), prominent Austrian rabbi.
- Leon Reich (1879–1929), lawyer and member of the Sejm of Poland
- Wilhelm Reich (1897–1957), American psychiatrist
- Eugeniusz Romer (1871–1954), geographer and geologist
- Lillian Roxon (1932–1973), writer
- Roman Rosdolsky (1898–1967), economist and political revolutionary
- Ruslana (born 1973), pop singer

== S ==
- Leopold von Sacher-Masoch (1836–1895), journalist and BDSM writer whose surname originated the term "masochism"
- Henryk Samsonowicz (1930–2021), historian
- Juliusz Schauder (1899–1943), mathematician, member of the Lwów School of Mathematics
- Iryna Senyk (1926–2009), poet, nurse, political dissident
- Filip Schleicher (1870–1932), Polish-Jewish lawyer, deputy mayor from 1913 to 1927
- Larisa Shepitko (1938–1979), Soviet film director.
- Andrey Sheptytsky (1865–1944), head of the Ukrainian Church through both the world wars
- Roman Shukhevych (1907–1950), general of the Ukrainian Insurgent Army
- Iva Sidash (born 1995), Ukrainian street and documentary photographer
- Adam Mikołaj Sieniawski (1666–1726), hetman
- Stanisław Skrowaczewski (1923–2017), composer
- Myroslav Skoryk (1938–2020), composer, Hero of Ukraine
- Natalka Sniadanko (born 1973), Ukrainian writer, journalist, translator
- Wacław Sobieski (1872–1935), historian
- Leopold Staff (1878–1957), poet
- Hugo Steinhaus (1887–1972), mathematician
- Zygmunt Steuermann (1899–1941), Polish football player
- Julian Stryjkowski (1905–1996), writer
- Roman Svintsitskyi (born 1981), former Ukrainian professional footballer
- Jan Szeliga (?–1636), wandering book printer
- Moritz Szeps (1835–1902), journalist
- Wacław Szybalski (1921–2020), medical researcher

== T ==
- Alfred Tarski (1901–1983), logician
- Władysław Tatarkiewicz, (1886–1980) historian of philosophy
- Aaron Moses Taubes (1787–1852), rabbi and writer
- Kazimierz Twardowski (1866–1938), philosopher, founder of Lwów-Warsaw philosophical school

== U ==
- Stanisław Marcin Ulam (1909–1984), mathematician
- Adam Ulam (1922–2000), historian

== V ==
- Yuri Velykanovych (1910–1938), journalist, volunteer of the International Brigades
- Elena Vesnina (born 1986), professional tennis player, multiple Olympic medallist
- Roman Viktiuk (born 1936), Soviet and Russian Ukrainian-born theatre director, actor and screenwriter

== W ==
- Jan Wasiewicz (1911–1976), soccer player of the Poland National Team
- Rudolf Weigl (1883–1957), scientist, inventor of the typhus vaccine
- Cyla Wiesenthal (1908–2003), wife of Simon Wiesenthal
- Simon Wiesenthal (1908–2005), Nazi hunter
- Wanda Wasilewska (1905–1964), writer

== Y ==
- Grigoriy Alekseyevich Yavlinskiy (born 1952), politician

== Z ==
- Julian Zachariewicz (1837–1898), architect and rector of the Lwów University
- Adam Zagajewski, poet
- Gabriela Zapolska, writer
- Andrzej Żuławski, film director
- Jozef J. Zwislocki, physicist and neuroscientist
- Helena Żygulska-Mach, physician and ophthalmologist

== See also ==
- People from L'viv (Category:)
