= Bretschneider =

Bretschneider is a German surname. Notable people with the surname include:

- Andreas Bretschneider (born 1989), German artistic gymnast
- Carl Anton Bretschneider (1808–1878), German mathematician
  - Bretschneider's formula, for the area of a quadrilateral
- Emil Bretschneider (1833–1901), German sinologist
- Frank Bretschneider (born 1956), German electronic musician
- Heinrich Gottfried von Bretschneider (1739–1810), German satirical writer
- Johann Michael Bretschneider (1680–1729), German painter
- Karl Gottlieb Bretschneider (1776–1848), German scholar and theologian
- Sylvia Bretschneider (1960–2019), German educator and politician

== Fictional characters ==
- Police agent Bretschneider from The Good Soldier Švejk

== See also ==
- Brettschneider, a variant spelling
