= Morykvas =

Morykvas (Ukrainian: Мориквас) is a gender-neutral Ukrainian surname. It may refer to

- Iryna Morykvas (born 1985), Ukrainian illustrator, artist, writer
- Nadiia Morykvas (born 1952), Ukrainian writer, essayist, literary critic
