= Schleich (disambiguation) =

Schleich is a German producer of handpainted toy figurines and accessories. Schleich may also refer to:

- Schleich (surname)
- Schleich, Germany, municipality in the Trier-Saarburg district, in Rhineland-Palatinate, Germany
- Schleich., taxonomic author abbreviation of Johann Christoph Schleicher
