= Schleich (surname) =

Schleich is a German surname derived from "Schleich", either a nickname or a place of residence. Notable people with the surname include:

- Carl Ludwig Schleich (1859–1922), German surgeon and writer
- Eduard Schleich the Elder (1812–1874), German landscape painter
- Eduard Schleich the Younger (1853–1893), his son, also a German landscape painter
- Eduard Ritter von Schleich (1888–1947), his grandson, a German flying ace
- Erwin Schleich (1925–1992), German architect
- Josef Schleich (1902–1949), Austrian humanitarian
- Pascal Schleich (born 1994), German politician
- Wolfgang P. Schleich (born 1957), professor of theoretical physics

== See also ==
- Schleicher
