= Schlicher =

Schlicher is a surname. Notable people with the surname include:

- Nathan Schlicher (born 1982), American politician
- Ronald L. Schlicher (1956–2019), American diplomat

== See also ==
- George F. Schlicher Hotel
- Schleicher (surname)
