= Lwów Scientific Society =

Lwów Scientific Society (Polish: Towarzystwo Naukowe we Lwowie) was a Polish learned society founded in 1901 in Lwów by Oswald Balzer as the Association of Support of Polish Sciences. In 1920, the name was changed into Lwów Scientific Society, and after World War II, when the city of Lwów was annexed by the Soviet Union, the Society was moved to Wrocław, where it exists under the name Wrocław Scientific Society.

The Society was the most important of the scientific organizations of Lwów. Its purpose was development and progress of sciences in all areas of human knowledge. It was divided into three departments:

- philological,
- historical-philosophical,
- mathematical-natural.

Also, there was a section of history of arts and culture.

Every year in June, a general meeting was called in which the director and secretary general made a report on Society's activities. It was financed by the Polish government as well as its own foundation and private donors. Members of the Society were divided into active and adopted, most of them were professors of Lwów's colleges. In 1927, the Society was directed by Oswald Balzer, and the deputy was Władysław Abraham.

Among members of the Society were such renowned names as Jan Baudouin de Courtenay, Aleksander Brückner, Stefan Banach, Henryk Arctowski, Leopold Caro, Benedykt Dybowski, Hugo Steinhaus and Rudolf Weigl.

== Sources ==
- Lwów’s Almanach
