= Johann Adalbert Angermayer =

Czech still life painter

- Born: Jan Vojtěch Angermayer; 9 November 1674; Bílina, Bohemia, Habsburg monarchy
- Died: 18 October 1740 (aged 65); Prague, Bohemia, Habsburg monarchy
- Known for: Still life painting

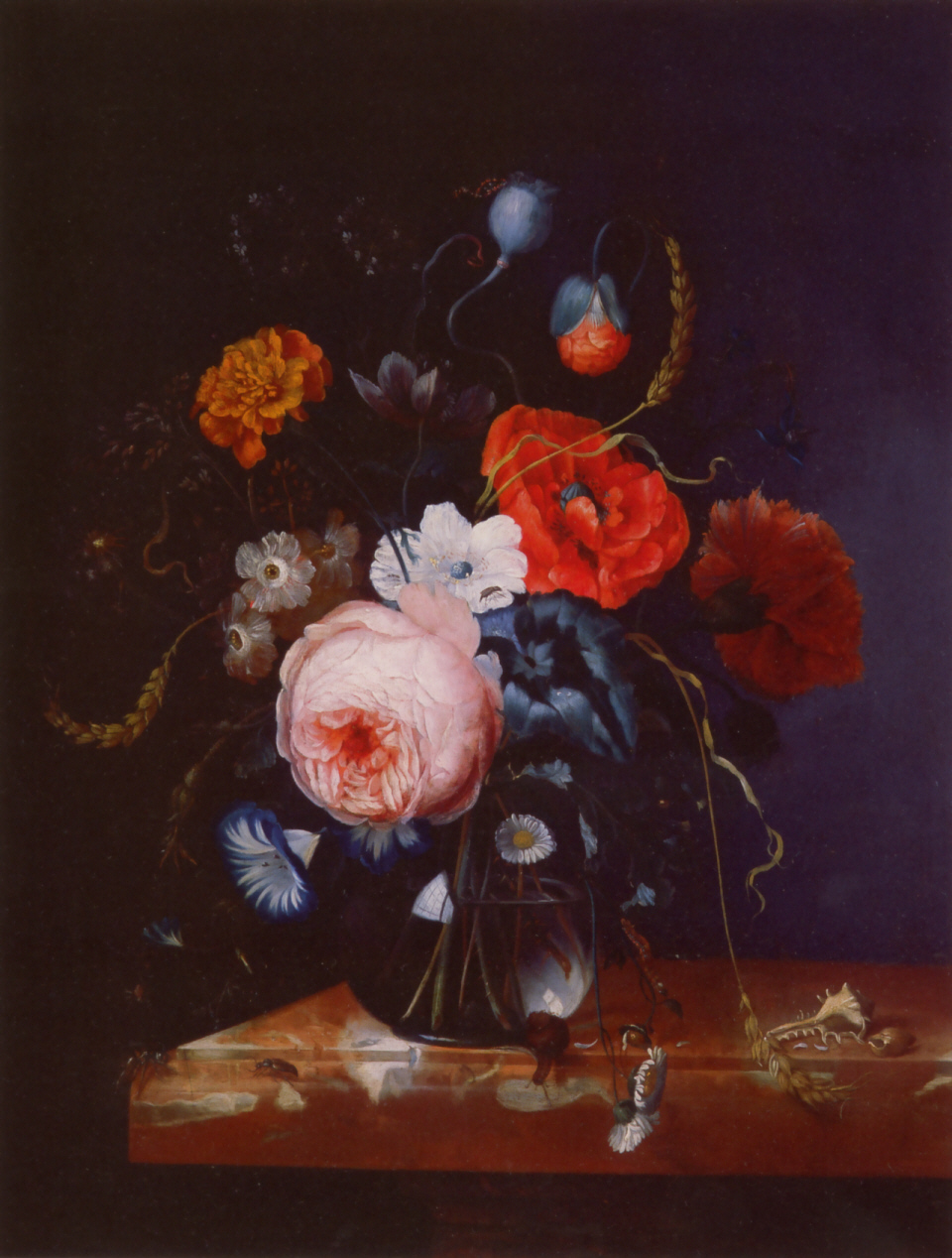
Flowers in a Vase (c. 1725) 41×32cm

Johann Adalbert Angermayer (Czech: Jan Vojtěch Angermayer; 9 November 1674 – 18 October 1740) was a Czech painter. He specialised in cabinet still life compositions. Since 1699, he studied painting in Prague under Johann Rudolf Byss and is recorded there as a member the Old Town Painter Guild between 1707 and 1727. He was known to paint counterparts to older solitary still life paintings, as was fashionable at the time. Some of his students include John Caspar Hirschely and Carl Kastner.

== Biography ==
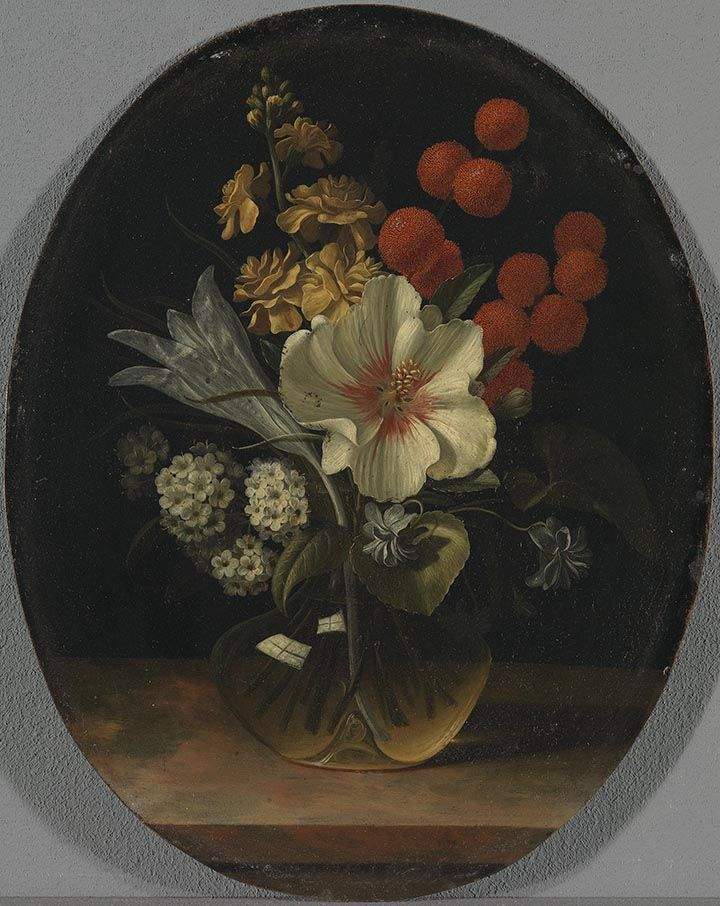
Still Life with Flowers (1692) 20×16cm

Angermayer was born on 9 November 1674 in Bílina. Since 1699, he lived in Prague, where he studied under Johann Rudolf Byss, who came to Prague seven years earlier. Johann Adalbert joined the Old Town Painter Guild in 1707. He built a reputation for his patiently detailed paintings of still life, often quite small in size. Among his pupils belong the early Roccoco painter John Caspar Hirschely and Carl Kastner. Other than his work stay at the Osek Monastery (1719–1722), Angermayer spent most of his life in Prague, where he died on 18 October 1740.

== Topics and style ==
Angermayer painted flowers, fabrics, hunting trophies and quiet scenes from nature as was customary, but also nontraditional compositions like his Still Life with a Watch or Still Life with a Jewelry Box (1708). He was greatly influenced by the Leiden Fijnschilders, as was his teacher Johann Rudolf Byss, who studied in Netherlands. Angermayer was known for his skill of realistic portrayal of details. Most of his work can be classified as cabinet still life, because the width or height of his paintings rarely exceeds 35 cm.
