= Stanisław Gebhardt =

Polish economist and activist (1928–2025)

- Born: Stanisław Mieczysław Gebhardt; 13 July 1928; Poznań, Poland
- Died: 27 February 2025 (aged 96); Wrocław, Poland
- Occupations: Economist, political thinker, and activist
- Known for: International activism in the Christian democratic movement and institutions
- Notable work: 'Democratici democristian e riflessioni' 'The Christian Democratic Union of Central Europe'
- Parent(s): Henryka Welfe, Stanisław Gebhardt

Stanisław Mieczysław Gebhardt (13 July 1928 – 27 February 2025) was a Polish resistance fighter, economist, émigré political activist, international social entrepreneur and veteran member of the Christian democratic movement. After his return to Poland after the Fall of the Berlin Wall, he was associated with centre-right politics and regarded as a political historian. Gebhardt received the Order of Bernardo O' Higgins.

== Background ==
Gebhardt was born in Poznań, the second child of a Polish Christian army medical officer, also Stanisław Gebhardt, and his wife Henryka, née Welfe. His father died in 1930 as a result of wounds sustained during World War I and the family moved to Kraków, where he attended school. After the outbreak of World War II, he became a scout and joined the Szare Szeregi. From 1943, aged 15, he became a partisan member of the Home Army. In 1944 he was arrested by the Gestapo and was imprisoned first in Montelupich Prison, followed by incarceration in Groß-Rosen and Mauthausen concentration camps. Upon liberation he returned to his home city to resume schooling. In 1946 he escaped through the old Polish-Romanian border and travelled south to Italy to join the ranks of the II Corps (Poland) with whom he reached the United Kingdom. The Polish Resettlement Corps enabled him to complete his school leaving certificate at Riddlesworth, Norfolk in 1948.

=== Student politics ===
In 1951 he became a member of the European Youth Parliament and became active in the International Union of Young Christian Democrats. Two years later he was awarded a bachelor's degree in economics by the Polish University Abroad and later attended further courses at City University London. In 1950 he met the young broadcaster journalist, Édouard Bobrowski, born in Turkey of Polish parents, who became General Secretary of the Paris-based Youth Section of the Central European Union of Christian Democrats. He moved to Paris to further his social and political studies at Sciences Po and continue his activism. While in Paris one of his projects was to help re-organise the money supply in the Vietnamese economy. He also tried his hand at broadcast journalism with the Polish section of Voice of America. In 1956 from his European base, he began his career as an economic adviser working mainly in Latin America and in Ghana.

== International activism ==
From 1954 to 1985 he remained on the committees of the exiled Stronnictwo Pracy (Labour Party). Between 1962 and 1976 he was engaged in the centre Esperienze Internazionali to study the functioning of democratic systems and international repercussions in Rome. From 1963 to 1972 he was also a director of the International Solidarity Foundation based in Rome. It gave him the opportunity to collaborate with the émigré Polish statesman and leading Christian democrat, Karol Popiel.

In 1964 when his friend Jerzy Kulczycki, founded the émigré publishing house, Odnowa, in London he invited Gebhardt to become a director of the company with the brief to finance and distribute in Poland titles banned under state censorship. The operation proved a success exporting to the then communist country forbidden authors, including George Orwell, Józef Garliński, Karol Popiel and Jan Nowak-Jeziorański.

As Polish representative of political organisations Gebhardt entered the international arena of Christian Democrat activism and in his youth worked alongside statesmen such as Robert Schuman.

In 1990 in Bratislava he was appointed vice president of the Christian Democratic Union of Central Europe, a position he held for four years. In 1991 at the Brussels convention he was appointed vice president of the Christian Democrats International.

== Return to democratic Poland ==
On his return to Poland in 1990 he was involved in the reactivated "Stronnictwo Pracy 1989", whose vice president he became. In 1995 he was made vice president of Ruch Odbudowy Polski. In 1994 he became president of the Ignacy Paderewski Foundation to Rebuild Democracy and Head of the Silesian Development Corporation.

In June 2020 the Polish Culture minister, Piotr Gliński appointed him chair of the Programmes Committee of the Institute for Legacy of Polish National Thought.

== Personal life and death ==
Gebhardt was married three times. The first two marriages produced a son each, and the last, two sons. Gebhardt died on 27 February 2025, at the age of 96.

== Distinctions ==
- In 1989 president Ryszard Kaczorowski (Polish government-in-exile) promoted him to Second lieutenant of the Polish Armed Forces
- In 1990 he was made a knight of the Order of Polonia Restituta
- In 2016 president Andrzej Duda made him a commander of the Order of Polonia Restituta
- Medal Zasłużony Kulturze Gloria Artis
- On 3 May 2023 President Duda awarded him Poland's highest and oldest decoration, the Order of the White Eagle

Other decorations:

- Order of Bernardo O'Higgins Chile
- Order of the Liberator Venezuela
- Order of Merit of the Italian Republic (Commendatore) Italy
- Krzyż Walecznych Poland
- Krzyż Zasługi z Mieczami Poland
- Krzyż Armii Krajowej Poland
- Medal Wojska Poland

== Bibliography ==
- Aldrich, Richard J. (1997). 'OSS, CIA and European unity: The American committee on United Europe, 1948–60'. Diplomacy and Statecraft. 8:1, 184 — 227. DOI: 10.1080/09592299708406035 URL: http://dx.doi.org/10.1080/09592299708406035
- Gebhardt, S. (2008). 'Democratici democristian e riflessioni' (Demochristian Democrats reflections). pl.it – rassegna italiana di argomenti polacchi. vol. 2. pp. 652–663. Associazione Italiana Polonisti (AIP). (in Italian)
- Gebhardt S. (2018). 'The Christian Democratic Union of Central Europe'. in Kosicki P., Łukasiewicz S. (ed.) Christian Democracy Across the Iron Curtain. Palgrave Macmillan, Cham. https://doi.org/10.1007/978-3-319-64087-7_15
- Kosicki, Piotr; Lukasiewicz, Slawomir (2018). Christian Democracy Across the Iron Curtain: Europe Redefined. Springer International, Palgrave Macmillan. ISBN 9783319877198.
