= Wrocław Scientific Society =

Polish learned society

The Wrocław Scientific Society (Polish: Wrocławskie Towarzystwo Naukowe, WTN) is a Polish learned society founded in 1946 in Wrocław. In historical studies of Polish science, it is described as an institutional successor to the Lwów Scientific Society, reflecting the post–Second World War relocation of Polish academic communities from Lwów (now Lviv, Ukraine) to western Poland.

The society is listed in reference works on the history of scientific associations in Poland as one of the general scientific societies that contributed to the reconstruction of academic life after 1945.

== History ==
The Wrocław Scientific Society was established on 10 June 1946 by scholars who had been displaced from Lwów following the incorporation of the city into the Soviet Union. A number of its founding members had previously been associated with the Lwów Scientific Society, which before 1939 was among the most important Polish learned societies.

Historians of science identify the creation of the society as part of broader post-war efforts to rebuild Polish scientific institutions and to preserve scholarly traditions disrupted by war and forced migration. Studies of academic life in Wrocław note its role in the early post-war period, when the city rapidly developed into a major university centre.

== Scholarly significance ==
In comparative studies of Polish learned societies, the Wrocław Scientific Society is classified as a general scientific society, bringing together researchers from multiple disciplines. Publications of the Polish Academy of Sciences discuss its activities in the context of the social and cultural role of scientific societies in post-war Poland.

The society is frequently cited in historical analyses as an example of institutional continuity linking the pre-war academic traditions of Lwów with the post-war scientific landscape of Wrocław.
