= Johann Rudolf Byss =

Swiss painter

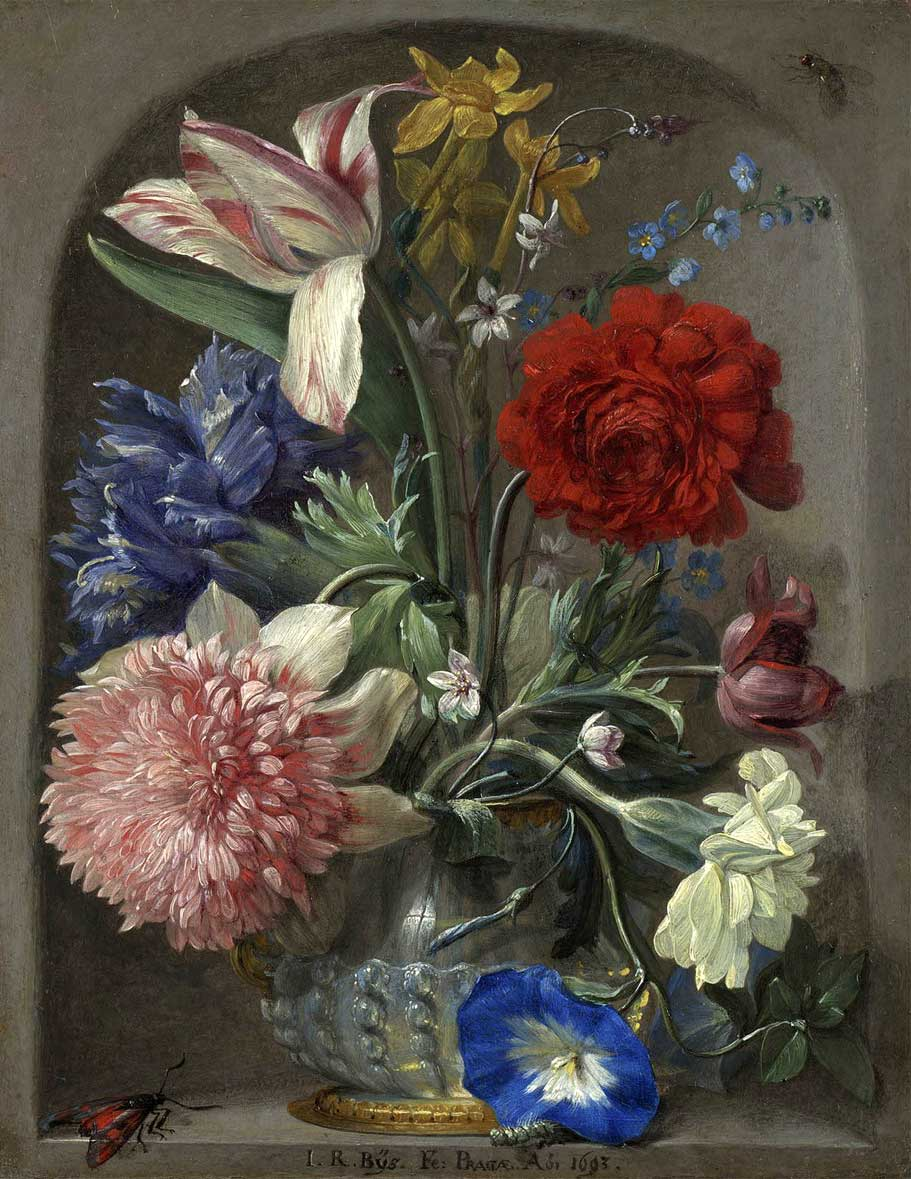
Johann Rudolf Byss, Flowers in a stone niche, 1693

Johann Rudolf Byss (1660–1738) was a Swiss painter.

== Biography ==
He was born in Solothurn and first learned painting from his father Johann Joseph Byss, and later from Johann Heinrich Roos, whose sons he would have known well. Byss' most important works were done during his stay in Prague. He traveled to Germany, England and the Netherlands in the 1680s to study. In 1689, he became court painter to Count Hermann Jakob Cern. Later that year, Byss married Maximiliana Wagner.

Johann Rudolf Byss is credited with bringing the Netherlandish and Italian classic styles to the art sphere in Prague. These influences are clearly present in his 1691 painting 'John of God' and in the 1692 'Vestal Claudia Quinta'.

Johann Rudolf Byss obtained the citizenship of Prague in 1692. Two years later, he was inducted into the painters' guild, of which he later became master. He is known for religious works and flower still lifes, and his pupil was Johann Adalbert Angermeyer. Johann Rudolf Byss is also believed to be the teacher of the German painter Johann Michael Bretschneider (1680–1729).

In 1713, he painted the ceiling fresco of the main staircase at Schloss Weissenstein. He later became the director of the gallery of paintings at that palace and in 1719 had the catalogue printed. This was the first printed German gallery catalogue.

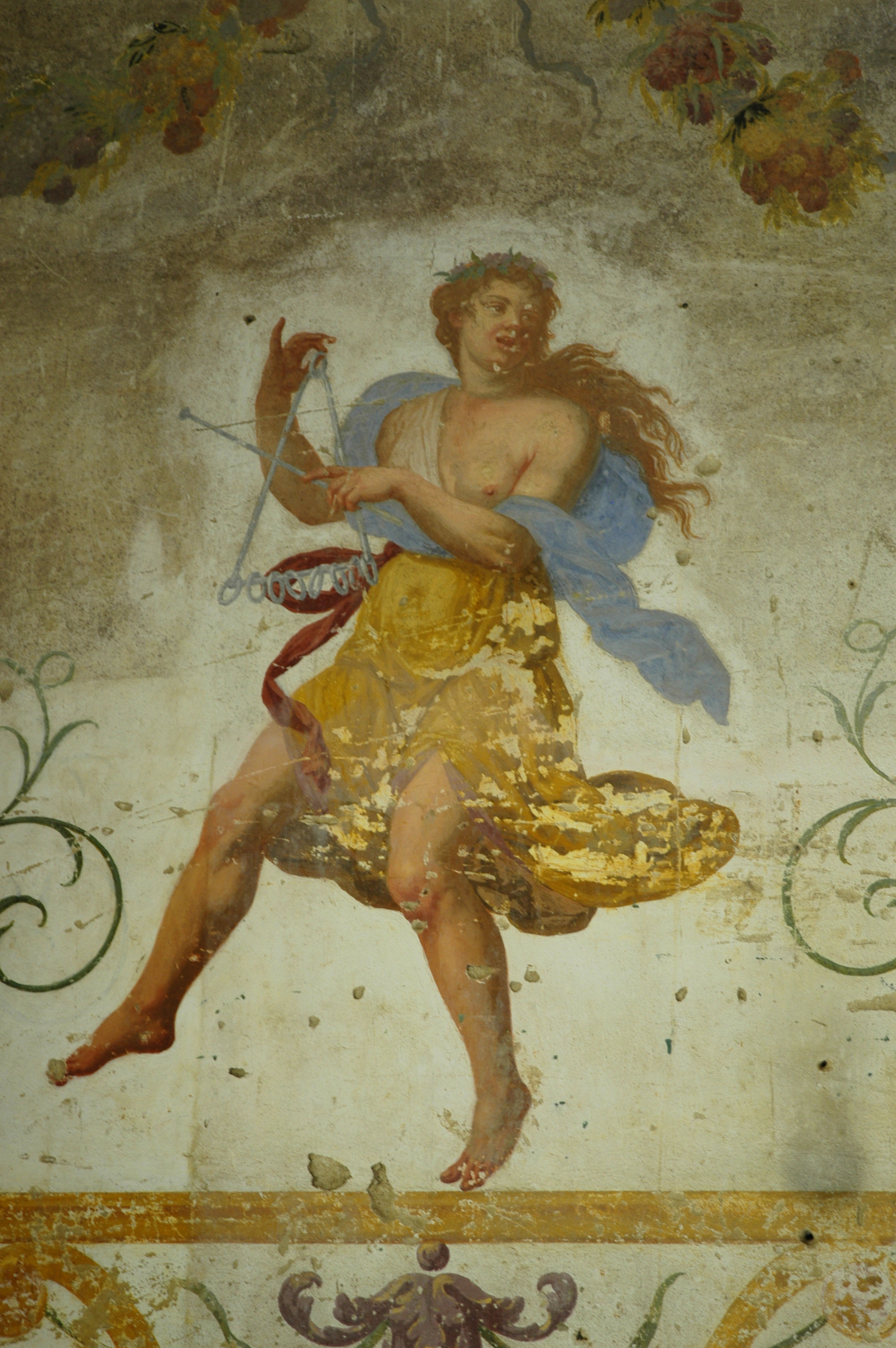
A painting by Johann Rudolf Byss

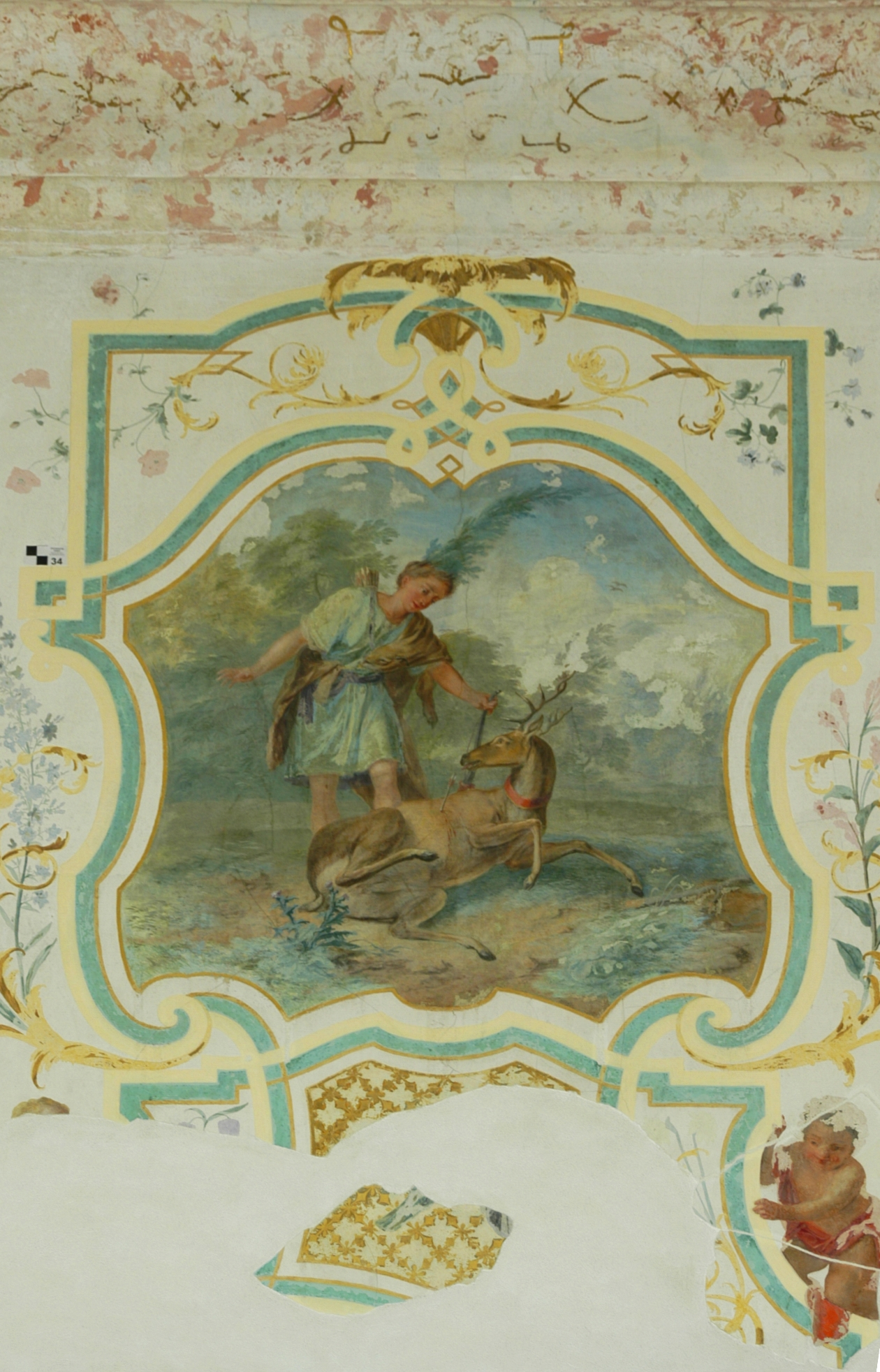
An example of Johann Rudolf Byss's painting.
