= Brettschneider =

Brettschneider is a German surname.
Brett means "dimensional lumber" and Schneider means "tailor".
In another derivation, a "Brettschneider" (lit. 'board cutter') is a sawmiller who is cutting wood into boards, for example in a sawmill.

The surname is commonly found among Jewish families, with many Jewish Brettschneiders originating from Galicia, Romania, and surrounding regions of present-day Ukraine.

Notable people with the surname include:

- Blake Brettschneider (born 1989), American soccer player
- Carl Brettschneider (1931–2014), American football player

== See also ==
- Bretschneider, a variant spelling
