= Jerzy Kulczycki =

Polish-British publisher and bookseller

Jerzy Sławomir Kulczycki (12 October 1931 in Lwów – 18 July 2013 in London) was a Polish engineer, activist bookseller, and publisher. He was the founder in 1996 of the Kulczycki (Orbis Books) prize in Polish Studies.

== Biography ==
In 1940, as a nine-year old, he was deported by the invading Soviets with his mother into captivity in Kazachstan. His father, a judge, had been murdered by the NKVD. In 1942 they were moved to Iran to join Anders' Army. From 1944 he was a pupil of the exiled Corps of Cadets. In 1947 he settled in the United Kingdom, where in 1954 he graduated at the University of London with a degree in civil engineering. In 1958 he specialised in hydrology and in 1964 in road construction. That same year he married Aleksandra, also a Polish displaced person. They had three children.

== Publishing and activism ==
As part of the Polish political emigré community, he was active in the Polish Labour Party (Stronnictwo Pracy), the Christian Democratic tendency. In 1964, as a sideline to his professional work, he established a publishing house, under the imprint, "Odnowa" (Renewal) in London, to produce emigré works and reprints in Polish, in particular the writings of Karol Popiel, Amintore Fanfani, Jan Nowak-Jeziorański and George Orwell. He invited his friend and fellow activist, Stanisław Gebhardt, to be a co-director of the firm, which was active until 1990.

=== Orbis Books ===
In 1972 with his wife, he bought a Polish bookshop, Orbis Books (London) in New Oxford Street, a business begun in Edinburgh during the war in 1944. They moved to new premises at 66 Kenway Road in Earl's Court where much of the Polish elite had settled after World War II. The shop stayed there until 2005, before moving to Blyth Road, Hammersmith. His bookstands were also available at the Polish Hearth Club and at St Andrew Bobola Church, Hammersmith. The business finally closed in 2011. Orbis Books (London) is not to be confused with the British partworks and book publisher, Orbis Publishing Limited.

During the Communist régime in Poland, Orbis Books (London) was one of the main exporters of banned and other Western literature to Poland, which often required unorthodox means of despatch to ensure delivery into the rightful hands. He was a major retailer of the influential Paris-based periodical, Kultura.

In 1996 Kulczycki and his family instituted a book prize as an award for peer reviewed titles focused on Polish culture and politics. The prize is administered by the Association for Slavic, East European, and Eurasian Studies in the United States.

Kulczycki was for many years a director of the Institute of Polish-Jewish Studies. He died of cancer in London in 2013, aged 82. His edited memoire, Atakować książką ("Attack with the Book"), was published posthumously in 2016.

== Distinctions ==
- The exiled Polish Writers Association honoured him as a bookseller with their award in 1981.
- He was decorated with the Order of Polonia Restituta by the Polish President in Exile in 1990.
- He was awarded the Officers Order of Polonia Restituta in 1998
- The Commanders Order of Polonia Restituta was conferred on him in 2005.

== See also ==
- List of Leopolitans
- Poles in the United Kingdom
- Stanisław Gebhardt
- Antony Polonsky

== Bibliography ==
- ZPPnO. Pożegnania (Obituary in Polish)
- Jerzy Kulczycki (12 October 1931 – 18 July 2013) Polish Heritage Society
- Garliński, Jarek (2017). "Jerzy Kulczycki: 12 October 1931–18 July 2013". Polin Studies in Polish Jewry. 29. Liverpool University Press: 497-500. doi:10.3828/polin.2017.29.497.
