= Joanna Nittenberg =

Austrian journalist

Joanna Nittenberg (born 1942 in Lemberg) is an Austrian journalist.

Joanna Nittenberg finished her degree in German studies and journalism at the University of Vienna with the dissertation "Kurt Tucholsky und die publizistische Auseinandersetzung mit der Weimarer Republik in der Weltbühne" ("Kurt Tucholsky and the publicistic examination of the Weimar Republic"). After her employment in the editorial office for culture of the ORF she became editor in chief and publisher of the magazine Illustrierte Neue Welt.

In 2005 Joanna Nittenberg was honoured with the "Golden badge of honour of Vienna" ("Goldenes Verdienstzeichen der Stadt Wien").
