= Anna Czekanowska-Kuklińska =

Polish musicologist and ethnographer (1929–2021)

Anna Czekanowska-Kuklińska (25 June 1929 in Lwów – 18 October 2021) was a Polish musicologist and ethnographer, professor at the University of Warsaw, daughter of anthropologist Jan Czekanowski.

She applied statistical-mathematical methods for analysis of folk music.

== Works ==
- Etnografia muzyczna (1971),
- Ludowe melodie wąskiego zakresu w krajach słowiańskich (1972),
- Kultury muzyczne Azji (1981).
