= Leopold Caro =

Polish economist

Leopold Caro (1864–1939) was a Polish historical school economist, international sociologist working with Gustav von Schmoller's Verein für Socialpolitik (VfS), and a lawyer. Caro functioned as an advocate for rights of oversea migrants and the establishment of economic cooperatives. Broadly conceived, he was a conservative symphatizer of the Sanation movement in Polish interwar politics, especially of its technocratic wing under Kazimierz Bartel, while he also maintained some contact with Narodowa Demokracja. First and foremost, Leopold Caro acted as a Catholic economist, who had strong ties with the church hierarchy and Catholic institutions. He is largely seen as a proponent of etatism, though he was a vocal critic as well as in-depth researcher of both National socialism and Soviet communism. He was a Jewish convert to Christianity of distant Sephardic origin who became a staunch anti-Semite.

== Life and work ==
His father, Henryk Caro (d. 1873), participated in the January Uprising and worked as a clerk at the local Mortgage Bank. Leopold was raised by his mother, Amelia Maria née Kolscher. He spent his childhood and youth in Lwów, at the time Hapsburg Lemberg of Galicia province, today Lviv in Ukraine. In 1881, he graduated with honors from the C.K. (Imperial and royal) IV Junior High School in Lwów. In 1885, he studied at the Faculty of Law of the University of Lwów. Two years later, he also obtained a diploma from the Faculty of Philosophy and a doctor of laws degree at the same university. For further studies, this time in economics, he went to the University of Leipzig, where he participated in the seminar of Professor August von Miaskowski (1838-1899). There, under the influence of the German historical school and French social solidarism, as well as Wagnerian thought, his economic and sociological views were shaped. There he also came into closer contact with Catholic social teaching. Before this period, he dealt mainly with legal issues. Only after returning from Leipzig, using his comprehensive education, did he expand his scientific interests to include social, economic, sociological, philosophical and historical issues.

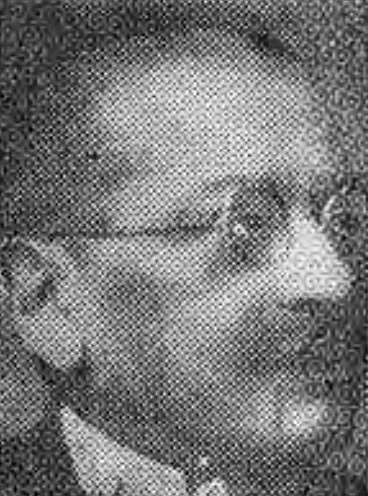
Polish economist Lepold Caro in 1937

In 1894, Caro passed the bar examination, after which he settled in Kraków, where he worked as a lawyer until 1914, while also working in the Society for the Cultivation of Social Sciences. In his works at that time, he focused on the problems of agricultural development and the situation of the rural population. He also conducted in-depth studies on the issues of emigration and emigration policy, which were praised by Karl Rathgen, among others. At the same time, he attacked the ethics of Judaism. Concerning Galicia, he criticized the widespread practice of usury, arbitrage and excessive brokerage within the poor economy as well as human trafficking to the Americas by criminal associations like Zwi Migdal. Condemnation from many Jewish circles was the final reason for Caro's conversion to Catholicism in 1903. In the first decade of the 20th century, he became associated with the Catholic social movement. Before, he had worked with both left leaning social reformers such as Zofia Daszyńska-Golińska and more conservative agrarian reformers like Adam Krzyżanowski (1873-1963), who, as an adherent of neoclassical economics, became his main rival among Second Republic top class economists.

On November 10, 1896, Caro married Salomea Chelińska, who functioned in welfare and educational organizations. After the outbreak of World War I, Caro was drafted into the army. He served in the military judicial corps; first in the Imperial and Royal army, then - voluntarily - in the Polish army, in which he reached the rank of colonel. Demobilized in 1920 after the end of the Polish-bolshevik war, he returned permanently to Lwów (lived at 21 Akademicka Street) and devoted himself entirely to scientific work. From 1920–1939 he was a professor of economics and law at the Politechnika Lwowska. There, he put an emphasis on two subjects: accounting and engineering economics, which he helped to popularize in interwar Poland. Among his academic students was the later secretary of industry and trade, Antoni Roman, who wrote a habilitation thesis under his guidance. Caro was a productive scientist, both in terms of the number of publications and societal activities. In 1932, he became vice-chairman of the Social Council of the Primate of Poland.

Caro contributed significantly to the formation and development of the movement of Polish economists. During the 1st Congress of Polish Economists in Poznań in 1929, he served as vice-chairman. There he delivered a speech on cartels and cartel legislation, which turned out to be an important trigger for legislation. He was also a member of the Consultative Work Committee of the Presidium of the Council of Ministers, culminating in the development of 11 detailed agendas, and was a member of the Lwów Scientific Society. Frequently, Caro was delegated to international congresses and scientific meetings, for example in Berlin, Vienna, Dresden, Prague, Budapest and Bucharest. He was a regular member of the "Casino" cultural club and the Literary and Artistic Circle in Lwów.

Leopold Caro died on February 8, 1939, in Lwów. He was buried at the Lychakiv Cemetery in Lwów. Caro is featured with a commemorative coin from 2020 in the series "Great Polish Economists" of the Narodowy Bank Polski. He received three renowned state orders in his lifetime, among them the Commander's Cross of Polonia Restituta.

== Economic publications and organization ==
Leopold Caro published over 200 works. His legacy includes several scholarly books, numerous journalistic works and articles published since 1886, in over 60 magazines and daily newspapers. Many of his publications were printed in the Jesuitic "Przegląd Powszechny" (since 1893) and the organ of the Polish Economic Society in Lwów, "Przegląd Ekonomiczny" (published since 1928; for the first four years under the title "Tracts and Reports of the PTE in Lwów"). Caro served as editor-in-chief of this magazine. The PTE itself was established in Lwów in 1921. In 1927, Caro, who had participated in the organization's work since its inception, took over as president of the PTE.

=== Solidarism ===
Caro is the precursor of Polish solidarism, popularizing it in the Christian mainstream. The development of his concept was influenced (primarily) by Catholic social teaching, as well as Charles Gide, Leon Bourgeois, John Ruskin and Thomas Carlyle. In his social and economic analyses, he opposed both individualistic concepts (liberalism and the idea of homo oeconomicus) and collectivist concepts (socialism and the idea of rebuilding society through law). Christian solidarism was supposed to be a path between these two extremes. Caro understood society in the way of Aristotle and Thomas Aquinas, as an organized community striving for the common good and guided by natural law. Caro's solidarism was based on cooperatives and moderate state interventionism, which united individuals in pursuit of the common good, while not excessively limiting their freedom and creativity. This interventionism was to involve organizing social and economic relations, control (including nationalization and monopoly) over the production of goods that could pose a public threat (alcohol, tobacco products, weapons) as well as anti-trust legislation. The ownership structure in the economy was to be diversified. The dominant form was to be private property, but alongside it there was to be state and municipal property. Solidarism also meant obligations on the part of the state to take care of the well-being of the individual. In his conception, this meant, among other things: development of social welfare and labor law.

== Book publications ==
- Obecny stan sprawy indemnizacyjnej, Lwów 1890.
- Der Wucher, eine sozialpolitische Studie, Lipsk 1893.
- Die Judenfrage, eine ethische Frage, Lipsk 1893.
- Kwestia żydowska w świetle etyki z przedmową autora, Lwów 1893.
- Reforma kredytu włościańskiego, Kraków 1893.
- Pomoc dla rolników w Austrii, Lwów 1895.
- Nowy projekt ustawy przeciw opilstwu, Kraków 1902.
- Zawodowa organizacja rolników, Kraków 1902.
- Pomoc prawna, Kraków 1905.
- Studia społeczne, Kraków 1906.
- Arbeitsvermittung und Auswanderung, Praga 1907.
- Das Los unserer Auswanderer, Wiedeń 1907.
- Statystyka emigracji austro-węgierskiej i polskiej do Stanów Zjednoczonych Ameryki Północnej, Kraków 1907.
- Wychodźstwo polskie, Warszawa 1907.
- Das internationale Problem der Auswanderungsfrage, Berlin 1908.
- Kwestia obecnego u nas bojkotu, Kraków 1908.
- Nowe drogi, Poznań 1908.
- Sądownictwo w sprawach agrarnych, Kraków 1908.
- Auswanderung und Auswanderungspolitik in Österreich, Lipsk 1909.
- Das internationale Problem der Auswanderungsfrage, Berlin 1909.
- Socjologia, t. 1, Wstęp do socjologii, cz. 1, Lwów 1912.
- Emigracja polska, Lwów 1913.
- Emigracja i jej wpływ na stosunki zdrowotne ludności, Kraków 1914.
- Emigracja i polityka emigracyjna ze szczególnym uwzględnieniem stosunków polskich, Poznań 1914.
- Odprawa p. Hupce – Prawda o P. Tow. Emigracyjnym, Kraków 1914.
- Prawdziwa działalność P.T.E. – Ignorancja, czy zła wola?, Kraków 1914.
- Etyka w życiu publicznym, Kraków 1914.
- Problemy skarbowe państwa polskiego, Kraków 1919.
- Równomierność świadczeń w ustawodawstwie, Warszawa 1920.
- Prawdy i prawa w naukach społecznych, Lwów 1921.
- Ku nowej Polsce, Lwów 1923.
- Potrzeba poczucia państwowego u nas, Kraków 1924.
- W sprawie upaństwowienia kredytu, Kraków 1924.
- Zasady nauki ekonomii społecznej, Lwów 1926.
- Droga do odrodzenia społeczeństwa. Idee przewodnie encykliki Rerum Novarum, Kraków 1927.
- Myśli Japończyka o Polsce, Lwów 1927.
- Wesen und Grenzen der Sozialökonomik, Berlin 1928.
- Solidaryzm, jego zasady, dzieje i zastosowania, Lwów 1931.
- Czy i kiedy mamy oszczędzać?, Lwów 1932.
- Współczesne prądy gospodarcze a spółdzielczość, Lwów 1932.
- Reformy gospodarcze i społeczne faszyzmu, Warszawa 1933.
- Problem wywłaszczenia, Poznań 1934.
- Zmierzch kapitalizmu, Poznań 1934.
- Prawo ekonomiczne, a socjologiczne, Lwów 1935.
- Problem społeczny w katolickim oświetleniu, Poznań 1935.
- Solidaryzm i kapitalizm, Włocławek 1937.

== Bibliography ==
- Baranowska, Marta; Fiktus, Paweł: Emigration seen through the eyes of a lawyer. Leopold Caro on the legal aspects of the seasonal labour emigration of Polish agricultural workers to Germany in the early 20th century. “Biuletyn Polskiej Misji Historycznej” 2023, nr 18, pp. 289-310.
- Baranowska, Marta: Leopold Caro’s criticism of the servantship law. Towards the idea of a solidary state, “Państwo i Prawo” 2023, nr 4 (926), pp. 36-52.
