= Roman Svintsitskyi =

Ukrainian footballer

Personal information
- Full name: Roman Mykhailovych Svintsitskyi
- Date of birth: 28 February 1981 (age 45)
- Place of birth: Lviv, Ukrainian SSR
- Height: 1.84 m (6 ft 1/2 in)
- Position: Midfielder

Senior career*
Years	Team	Apps	(Gls)
2000	Naftovyk Boryslav		
2000–2001	Halychyna Drohobych	13	(2)
2001–2002	Dynamo Simferopol	21	(0)
2003	Dinamo Brest	26	(3)
2004	Spartak Ivano-Frankivsk	28	(4)
2004	→ Spartak-2 Kalush	4	(2)
2005–2007	Krymteplytsia Molodizhne	68	(8)
2007–2009	Obolon Kyiv	59	(3)
2009	Feniks-Illichovets Kalinine	4	(0)
2010	Krymteplytsia Molodizhne	2	(0)
2010	Prykarpattya Ivano-Frankivsk	2	(0)
2011–2013	Krymteplytsia Molodizhne	43	(8)
- * Club domestic league appearances and goals

Roman Mykhailovych Svintsitskyi (Ukrainian: Роман Михайлович Свінціцький; born 28 February 1981 in Lviv) is a former Ukrainian professional footballer.
