= Oswald Balzer =

Polish historian (1858–1933)

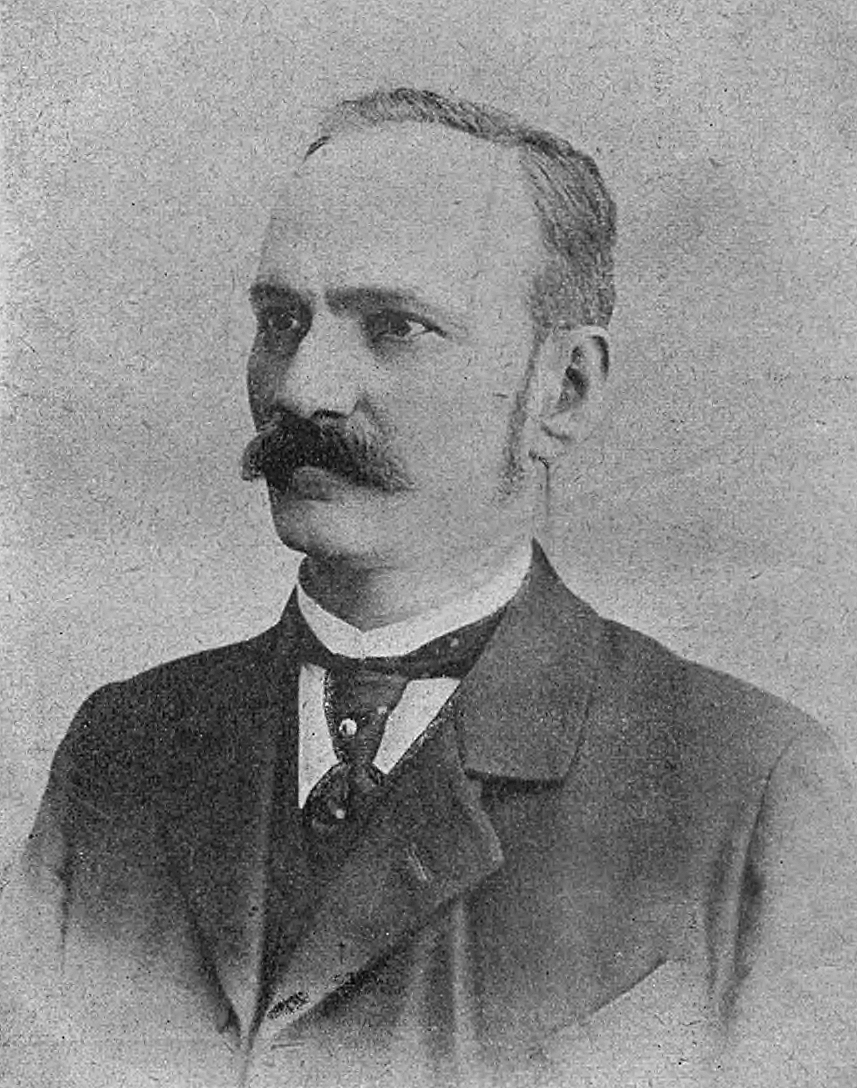
- Born: Oswald Marian Balzer; 23 January 1858; Chodorów, Kingdom of Galicia and Lodomeria, Austrian Empire
- Died: 11 January 1933 (aged 74); Lwów, Lwów Voivodeship, Second Polish Republic
- Resting place: Lychakiv Cemetery

Academic background
- Education: Universität Lemberg
- Alma mater: Jagiellonian University

Academic work
- Discipline: History
- Sub-discipline: History of law

Oswald Marian Balzer (23 January 1858 in Chodorów – 11 January 1933 in Lwów) was a Polish historian of law and statehood who was one of the most renowned Polish historians of his time.

In 1887 he became a professor at the University of Lwów. Between 1895 and 1896 he also briefly served as its rector. Since 1891 until his death he was also the director of City Archives in Lwów. His best work is Genealogia Piastów (1895). In 1888 he was offered a seat in the Polish Academy of Skills, as well as several other scientific societies, both in Poland and abroad. In 1901 he founded the Society for the Support of Polish Science in Lwów (Towarzystwo dla Popierania Nauki Polskiej we Lwowie), the first such society in the city, later to be renamed to Lwow Scientific Society (1920). Among the fields of his studies were the history of Polish statehood and Poland's historical law, as well as the early history of Slavic states.

He was buried in the Łyczakowski Cemetery.

== Works ==
- Kancelarye i akta grodzkie w wieku XVIII (1882)
- Geneza Trybunału Koronnego (1886)
- Regestr złoczyńców grodu sanockiego: 1554–1638 (1891)
- Walka o Tron krakowski w latach 1202–1210/11 (1894)
- Genealogia Piastów (1895)
- O następstwie tronu w Polsce (1897)
- Historia ustroju Austrii w zarysie (1899)
- O zadrudze słowiańskiej (1899)
- Z powodu nowego zarysu historii ustroju Polski (1906)
- O Morskie Oko. Wywód praw polskich przed sądem polubownym w Gradcu (Grazu)] (1906)
- O kilku kwestiach spornych z historii ustroju Polski (1907)
- Państwo polskie w pierwszym siedemdziesięcioleciu XIV i XVI wieku (1907)
- Skartabelat w ustroju szlachectwa polskiego (1911)
- Stolice Polski 963–1138 (1916)
- Skarbiec i Archiwum koronne w dobie przedjagiellońskiej] (1917)
- Królestwo Polskie 1295–1370, t. I-III (1919–1920)
- Narzaz w systemie danin książęcych pierwotnej Polski (1928)
- Corpus iuris Polonici 1506–1522, t. III oraz cz. I tomu IV obejmująca lata 1523–1534 (1906; 1910)
- Porządek sądów i spraw prawa ormiańskiego z r. 1604 (1912)
- Przegląd palatynów polskich w czasie panowania Piastów, w: Pisma pośmiertne, t. III (1937)
