= Johann Michael Bretschneider =

German painter

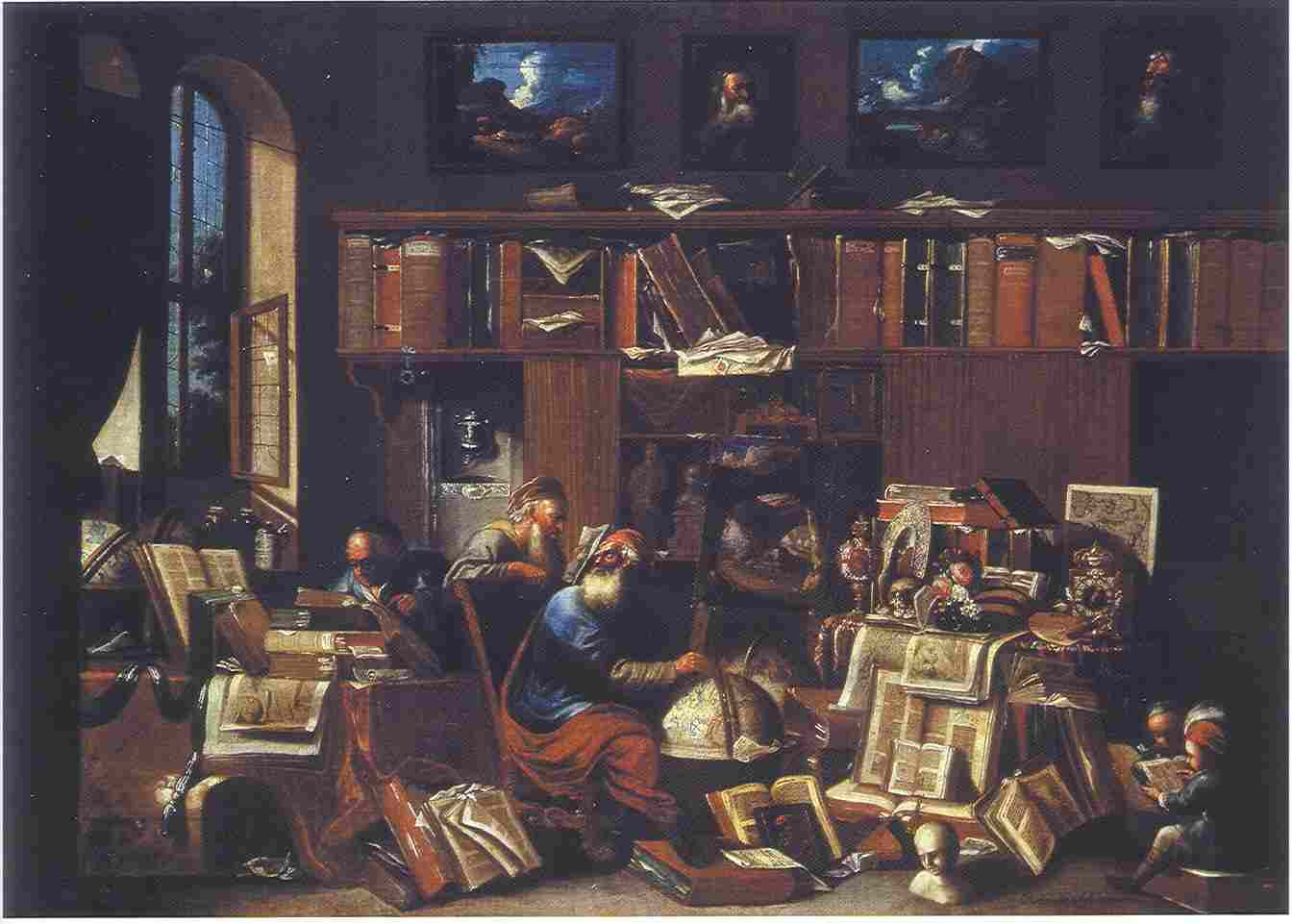
Philosophers in study, 1700; National Museum of Wrocław

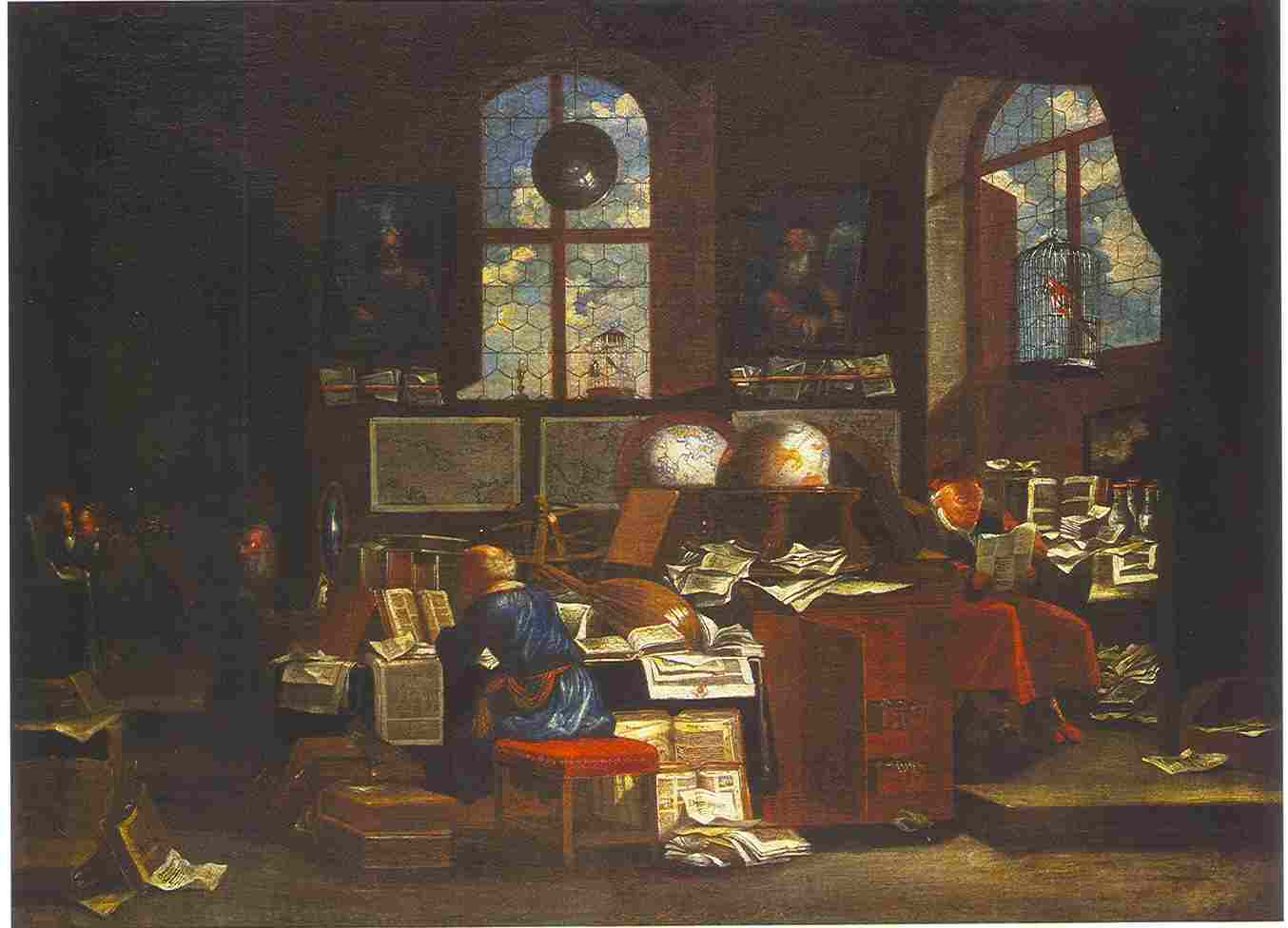
Scholar in study, 1700; National Museum of Wrocław

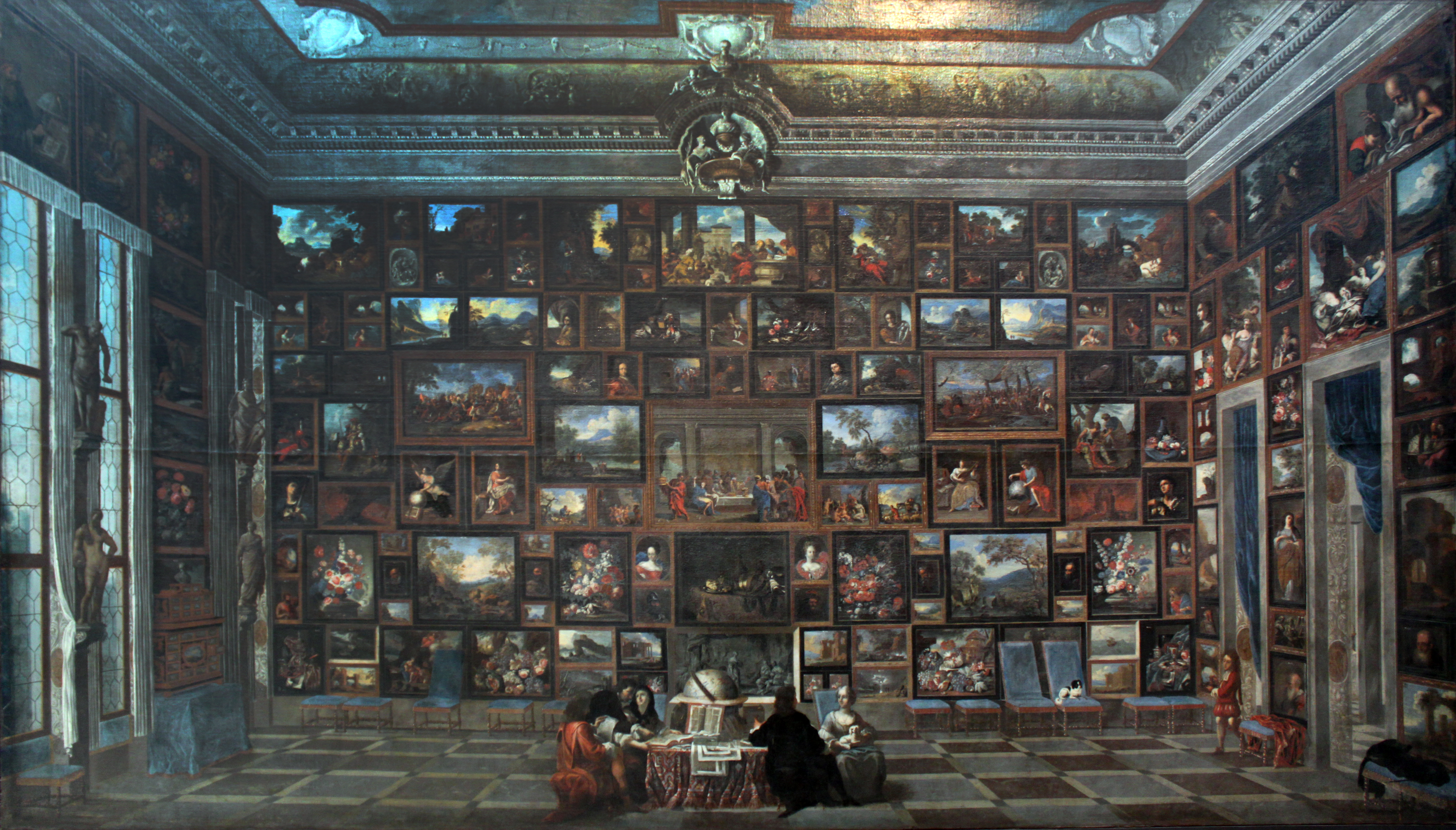
Picture Gallery, 1702, Germanisches Nationalmuseum

Johann Michael Bretschneider (1680–1729) was a German painter.

== Life ==
Bretschneider was born at Aussig, in Bohemia. His parents were Wentzel and Ludmilla Bretschneider. His teacher is not assuredly known, but it is believed that he learned from Johann Rudolf Byss (1660–1738) in Prague. On 18 July 1700, he was admitted to the painters' guild in Old Town and got Citizenship on 20 September 1700. He stayed in Prague until 1703. In the years 1717–1721, he can be detected in Vienna, where he painted genre pictures and flowers, then he probably came to Bavaria. Pictures of him are displayed in the Pinakothek in Munich (p.e. Musical Entertainment) and in the Germanisches Nationalmuseum in Nuremberg (p.e. Picture Gallery).
