= Andriyan Hutnyk =

Ukrainian politician and businessman (born 1968)

- Андріян Юрійович Гутник
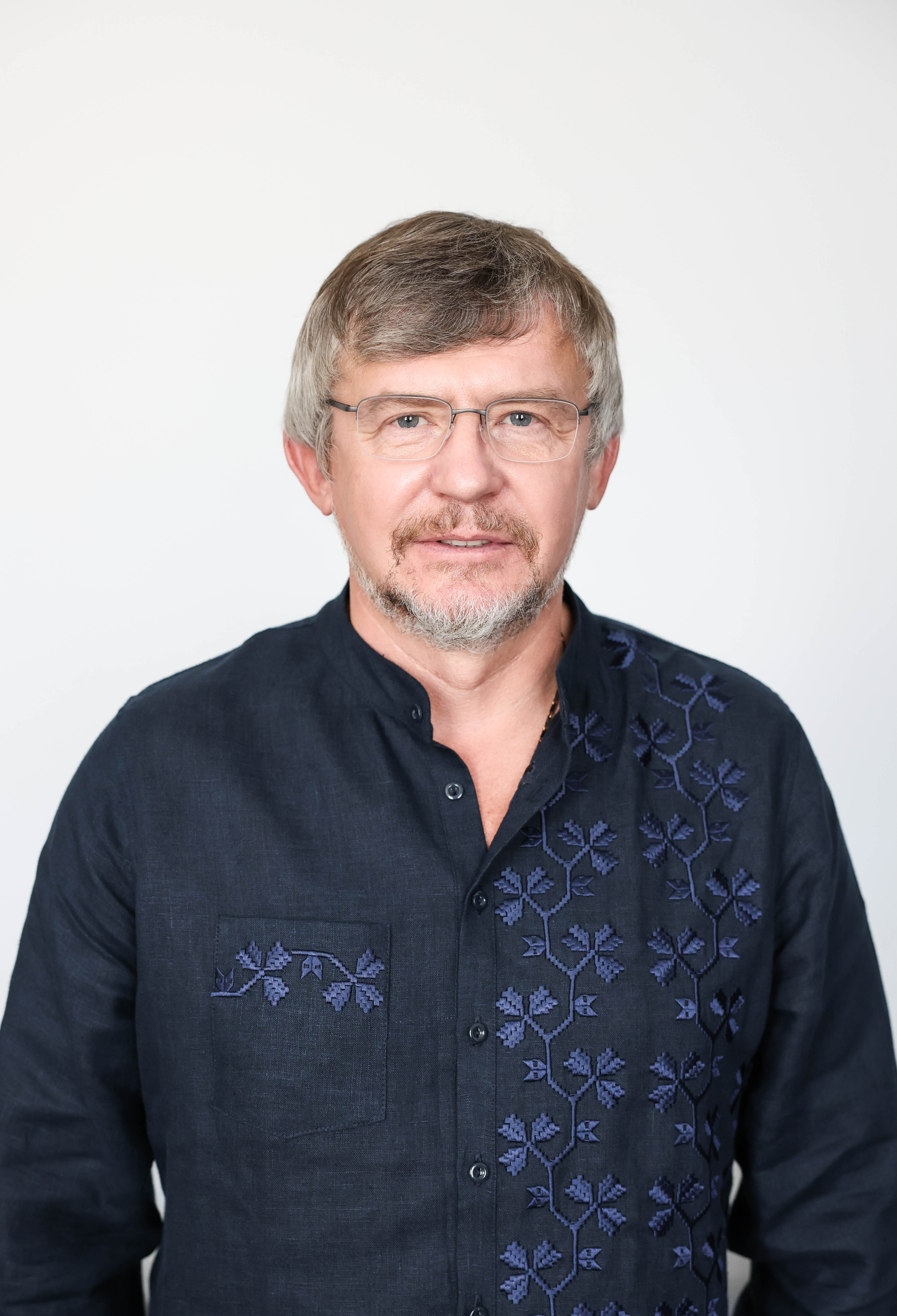

Member of the Lviv City Council
- Incumbent
- Assumed office 2010

Personal details
- Born: October 6, 1968 (age 57) Lviv, Ukrainian SSR, Soviet Union
- Party: Svoboda
- Occupation: Politician, sports executive

Andriyan Hutnyk (born 6 October 1968) is a Ukrainian politician from Lviv. A member of the Svoboda party, he was a deputy of the Ternopil Oblast Council and served as a deputy of the Lviv City Council of the 6th, 7th and 8th convocations. He is also the first vice-president of the Swimming Federation of Ukraine and a chair of the Lviv Oblast Swimming Federation. He has received the Order of Merit in 2024.

== Biography ==
Hutnyk was born on 6 October 1968 in Lviv. In 2012 he graduated from the Lutsk Institute of Human Development of the "Ukraine" Open International University of Human Development with a degree in documentation and information activity. In 2015 he completed a degree in public administration at the Lviv Regional Institute of Public Administration of the National Academy for Public Administration under the president of Ukraine. Since 2023, he is a PhD student at the State Higher Educational Institution 'Ukrainian National Forestry University', specializing in Public Management and Administration."

Hutnyk has worked as a private entrepreneur and as a company director. He held chairman positions in a company that operates the "Plyazh" water park in Lviv.

Since 2009, Hutnyk has headed the Lviv Oblast Swimming Federation and is also a first vice-president of the Swimming Federation of Ukraine. In 2026, he organised national youth and junior swimming championships held in Lviv. In April 2026, after the Swimming Federation of Ukraine declined to play a World Aquatics water-polo match against a team competing under neutral status that included Russian athletes, Hutnyk publicly supported the decision, stating that there could be no neutrality "where there is an aggressor". At the initiative of Andrian Hutnyk and in cooperation with the French organization Pour l’Ukraine, pour leur liberté et la nôtre, the Ukrainian national team, together with its French partners, honored the memory of Ukrainian swimmers who lost their lives as a result of Russian aggression during the 2026 European Aquatics Championships in Paris.

== Political career ==
In 2009, Hutnyk was elected to the Ternopil Oblast Council for Svoboda. In 2010, he was subsequently elected to the Lviv City Council and re-elected in later convocations, serving on various standing committees, including those dealing with architecture and urban planning, land use, and budget and finance. He was re-elected to the council's eighth convocation in the 2020 local elections.

== Volunteer activity ==
Since 2014, Hutnyk operates as a volunteer, and following the start of the Russian invasion of Ukraine in February 2022 he co-founded a volunteer organisation to supply Ukrainian military units and assist people affected by the war.

In 2022 he received a departmental award from the Ministry of Defence of Ukraine "For Assistance to the Armed Forces of Ukraine" and Order of Merit in 2024.

== Personal life ==
Hutnyk is married to Olena Hutnyk and has two daughters.
