= Schleicher (surname) =

Surname list

Schleicher is a German surname derived from "Schleich", either a nickmname or a place of residence. Notable people with the surname include:

- Alexander Schleicher (1901–1968), German sailplane designer
- August Schleicher (1821–1868), German linguist
- Bernard Schleicher, Austrian-born British businessman
- Carl Schleicher (1825–1903), Austrian painter
- Filip Schleicher (1870–1932), Polish-Jewish lawyer, deputy mayor of Lviv
- Gustav Schleicher (1823–1879), German-American engineer and US congressman
- Kurt von Schleicher (1882–1934), German general and chancellor
- Nikita Shleikher (born 1998), Russian diver
- Ruby Schleicher (born 1998), Australian rules footballer
- Rüdiger Schleicher (1895–1945), German resistance fighter against the Nazi régime
- Thomas Schleicher (1972–2001), Austrian judoka
- Ursula Schleicher (born 1933), German politician and harpist

== See also ==
- Schleich
