= Josef Schleich =

Josef Schleich (1902 – 7 February 1949) was an Austrian who smuggled Jews across the border to Yugoslavia during the time of National Socialism.

== Life and career ==
Schleich was born in Graz, Styria. He was a poultry farm owner, and, until Germany's annexation of Austria in 1938 (the Anschluss), he also smuggled flints and saccharin to Yugoslavia. After the Anschluss Schleich expanded his business. Jews were no longer welcome by other countries, having no assets after paying high taxes. Schleich taught farming and issued certifications of this training to Jews to help them emigrate. Too many certificates were issued, and Schleich lost his credit and customers. Schleich then became a smuggler. Many Jews were able to cross the border with his help. He pretended to be a travel guide to transport people to Yugoslavia. He charged 670 German Reichsmark per person and his business flourished. Before the start of the Balkans campaign his activity was tolerated by the Nazi authorities, but on 12 March 1941 Schleich and his colleagues were arrested and his business was ended. He was sentenced to ten months in prison and afterwards drafted to the "Wehrmacht" (armed forces of Germany). In 1945 he returned to Graz, Styria. Some Jews who did not cross the border with his help they accused him of taking advantage of the Jews' assets. The lawsuit was ended due to lack of evidence. Schleich died on 7 February 1949 from cirrhosis of the liver.

Schleich's work remained controversial in Austria. He had earned money, which was illegal, but he saved hundreds of lives. In 2002 the Braunau Contemporary History Days had a discussion on this topic.

== Literature ==
- Hannelore Fröhlich, Spurensuche. Mit einem Nachwort von Walter Brunner. Steirische Verlagsanstalt, Graz 1999. ISBN 3-85489-023-0
- Hannelore Fröhlich, Judenretter - Abenteurer - Lebemann: Josef Schleich. Spurensuche einer Tochter. LIT Verlag Dr. W. Hopf, Berlin 2007. ISBN 978-3-8258-0923-2.
