= Andriy Protsyk =

Ukrainian footballer

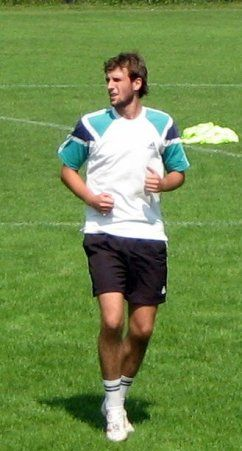

Personal information
- Full name: Andriy Vasylovich Protsyk
- Date of birth: 17 July 1986 (age 40)
- Place of birth: Lviv, Ukraine
- Height: 1.87 m (6 ft 1 1/2 in)
- Position: Defender

Youth career
- 2000–2003: Karpaty Lviv

Senior career*
Years	Team	Apps	(Gls)
2003–2007	Karpaty Lviv	3	(0)
2004	→ Halychyna-Karpaty Lviv	5	(1)
2004–2006	→ Karpaty-2 Lviv	30	(2)
2007–2008	Korosten	12	(0)
2009	Karyer Torchynovychi		
2009	Kulykiv	2	(0)
2009–2010	Wisła Puławy	21	(1)
2010	Kulykiv	7	(0)
2011	Orzeł Wierzbica	15	(4)
2011	Sambir	7	(0)
2012	Sokil Zolochiv	12	(0)
2012	Bory Borynychi	6	(0)
2013	SKK Pisochna	9	(0)
2014	Avanhard Zhydachiv	2	(0)
2014	Mykolaiv	3	(0)
2014	MKS Kańczuga		
2015	KS Kisielów		
2015	MKS Kańczuga		
2016	Start Pruchnik	2	(0)
2017	MKS Kańczuga	2	(0)
- * Club domestic league appearances and goals

Andriy Protsyk (Ukrainian: Андрій Процик; born 17 July 1986) is a Ukrainian former professional footballer who played as a defender.

He played for Karpaty Lviv in the Ukrainian Premier League. In March 2007, Karpaty broke their contract with Protsyk. Shortly after, he signed with Korosten where he played for one season.

== Honours ==
Orzeł Wierzbica

- IV liga Masovia South: 2010–11
