= Aaron ben Phinehas =

Rabbi (died 1651)

Aaron ben Phinehas was a member of the rabbinical college of Lemberg, and appears in that capacity among the rabbis who had to decide a case in matrimonial law with regard to the marriage of the widow of a man who had been killed by the bands of Chmielnicki. Aaron died at Lemberg, June 20, 1651.
