= Sofiia Burak =

Ukrainian artist of artistic textiles, painter, graphic artist (1961–2016)

- Софія Ярославівна Бурак
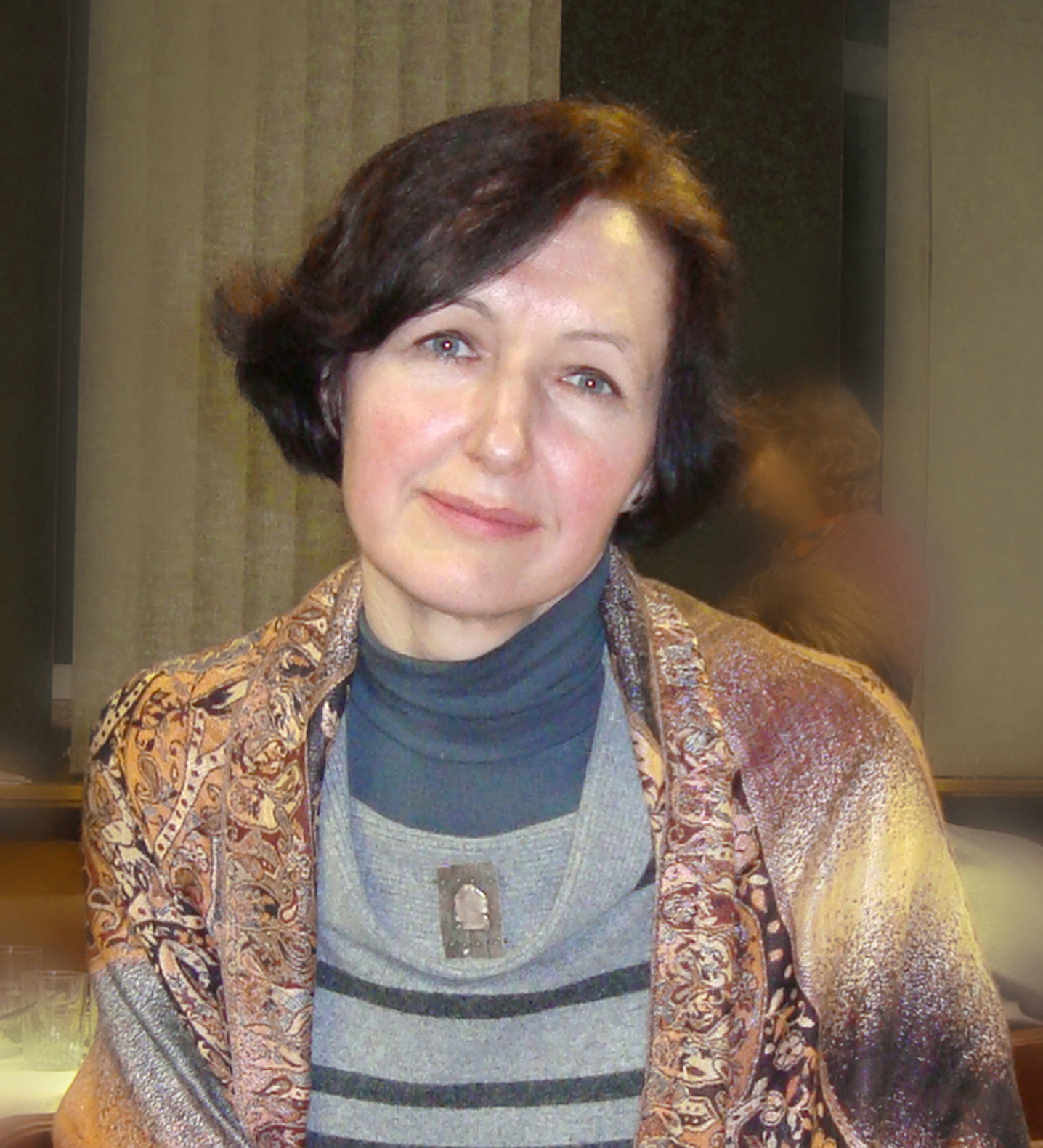
- Born: 17 December 1961; Lviv
- Died: 20 October 2016 (aged 54); Lviv
- Education: Lviv Institute of Applied and Decorative Arts
- Occupations: Artist of artistic textiles, painter, graphic artist

Sofiia Burak (Ukrainian: Софія Ярославівна Бурак; 17 December 1961 – 20 October 2016) was a Ukrainian artist of artistic textiles, painter, graphic artist. Member of the National Union of Artists of Ukraine (1995). Daughter of Yaroslav Burak.

== Biography ==
Sofiia Burak was born on 17 December 1961 in Lviv.

In 1984, she graduated from the Lviv Institute of Applied and Decorative Arts (teachers: Oleksandra Krypiakevych, Nataliia Pauk, Ihor Bodnar). From 1984 to 1986, she worked as an artist at the Lviv State Jewelry Plant; from 1986 to 1989, she held the positions of design artist and drawing instructor at the Lviv Forestry Institute, which is now known as the National Forestry University of Ukraine. From 1984 to 1986, she worked as an artist at the Lviv Jewelry Factory; from 1986 to 1989, she held the positions of design artist and drawing instructor at the Lviv Forestry Institute; from 1990 to 1995, she worked as the head of the production department of the META Theater of the House of scientists; at the same time, in 1993, she began working as an artist, art editor, and from 1998, as the chief artist of the publishing department of the Monastery of Monks of the Studio Charter "Svichado" in Lviv. From 2006, she has worked as a senior lecturer at the Department of Artistic Textiles of the Lviv National Academy of Arts. She was the author of the "Computer-Aided Design" methodology for students of the department where she taught.

From 2005 she received a scholarship from the state program of the Ministry of Culture and National Heritage of Poland "Gaude Polonia" (Łódź, Poland).

She died on 20 October 2016 in Lviv and was buried in the family tomb on the 68th field of Lychakiv Cemetery.

== Creativity ==
From 1985, she has presented her works at regional, all-Ukrainian, and international exhibitions. Her personal exhibitions were held in Lviv (1995, 2006, 2007, 2009, 2012, 2025, posthumously), Łódź (2005, 2006), Wrocław (2005, 2015), Karpacz (2005), Wrocław (2006), Kamienna Góra (2014, all in Poland). From 1989, she has participated in symposiums and plein-airs.

In her works, Burak delves deeply into sacred, ethnographic, and lyrical-philosophical themes and images, offering her unique vision of them. Her tapestries impress with their refined graphic composition and masterful color scheme. Her experimental works hold a special place. These volumetric-plastic and volumetric-spatial pieces are distinguished by their originality and high artistic and aesthetic level. For their creation, Burak uses untraditional techniques such as assemblage or wrapping, as well as unusual materials: cellophane, metal shavings, paper, photographs, polyethylene and photographic film, etc. Among these works, one can find both figurative and abstract compositions.

Separate works are preserved in the collections of the Museum of Ethnography and Crafts and the Western Scientific Center in Lviv, the Saint Volodymyr Foundation, and the Ukrainian Museum in Stamford (USA), as well as in private collections in Ukraine, Poland, Germany, the USA, and Canada. She also created in the field of book graphics, for which she designed "Letters of Nicodemus" by Jan Dobraczyński (1997) and "The Imitation of Christ" by Thomas à Kempis (1998). Her work also included painting.

Among important works:

- tapestry — "Vidlyha" (1988), "Anhele, okhoronets mii..." (1992), "Yaka tvoya dolia?...", "Svitlo" (both — 1993), "Pohliad u vikno vchorashnoho lita" (1996), "Kompozytsiia-5", "Kompozytsiia V" (both — 1997), "Sonyachnyi anhel", "Pohliad u vikno vchorashnoho lita" (both — 1998), "Koly v Ukraini pivnich, u Kanadi svitaie" (1999), "Bez nazvy", "Doroha" (both — 2000), "Voda", "Bozha ruchka" (both — 2005), "Vverkh" (2016);
- textile — "Piznannia" (2002), "Mezhi" (2003);
- painting, print — "Meditatsiia", triptych "Liudyna i ptakha", "Spalakhy", "Romanskyi sobor", "Skhodynky", "Alfa-omeha", "Struktura 1", "Struktura 2" (all — 2005), polyptych "Voda" (2006);
- gluing — "Soniachnyy doshch" (2002), "Flamenko", "Bez nazvy" (both — 2005), "Oformlennia restoranu «Lucky Bull» Bukovel" (2009), "Moia daleka zoria" (2010), diptych "Dialoh I" (2012), triptych "Dialoh II" (2012–2013), "Istoriia odnoho lystka", "Mizhchassia" (both — 2013), "Labirynt I", "Labirynt II" (both — 2014);
- mixed media — "Hodynnyk" (2006), "Perety mezhu" (2009), series "Stvorennia svitu", "Rozmova" (both — 2014), "Rozmova" (2015);
- painting — "Kruhoverty" (2006), "Korol'-blazen'" (2009), "Dva anhely. Prysvyata Yaroslavi Muzytsi", "Koleso krutyt'sia", "Bez nazvy" (2010), "Hranytsia II", "Noosfera I", "Bez nazvy", "Do svitla. Prysvyata bat'kovi", "Dodomu" (all — 2011), "Perekhozhzhnyi", "L'vivs'ki rozdumy", "Zymove podvir'ia", "Yabluka", "L'vivs'ki kvity", "Soniakhy", "Pol'ovi kvity" (all — 2012), "Kompozytsiia-3", "Kompozytsiia-4", "Kompozytsiia-5", "Kompozytsiia-6", "Kompozytsiia-7", "Kompozytsiia-8", "Vpered-I", "Vpered-II", "Labirynt" (all — 2014);
- design and layout — "Reims'ke Evanheliie Anny Yaroslavivny" (2010).

== Awards ==
- Diploma of the International Symposium on Artistic Textiles "Riga–89" and the "Lviv Autumn Salon 'Vysokyi Zamok'" exhibition (Lviv, 1997).

== Bibliography ==
- Burak Sofiia Yaroslavivna / H. D. Kusko // Encyclopedia of Modern Ukraine [Online] / Eds. : I. М. Dziuba, A. I. Zhukovsky, M. H. Zhelezniak [et al.] ; National Academy of Sciences of Ukraine, Shevchenko Scientific Society. – Kyiv : The NASU institute of Encyclopedic Research, 2004, upd. 2016.
- Чегусова З. Декоративне мистецтво України кінця ХХ століття. 200 імен: Альбом-каталог. К., 2002.
- Софія Бурак: Каталог / Упоряд. та автор вступних статей Т. Г. Печенюк. Львів: Папуга, 2019. 203 с.: іл.
