= Yaroslav Derega =

Derega Yaroslav
- Born: July 16, 1956 (age 70); Lviv, Ukraine

Yaroslav Derega (Ukrainian: Дереґа Ярослав Степанович; born July 16 1956, in Lviv, Ukraine) is a Ukrainian sinologist, linguist, educator, journalist and polyglot.

== Biography ==
Derega was born in Lviv, Ukraine and studied at the National Ivan Franko Lviv University at the foreign languages department. He also studied Chinese in Moscow and Beijing and taught English, Italian and Chinese at schools, kindergartens and universities.

== Activity ==
He developed an original method of teaching foreign languages "Language as Textual Gesture". This methodical trend was experimentally approbated at Cambridge University, GB, as the only natural method of teaching foreign languages.

He is the founder of the first in the world unique multi language theatre "Fiesta", where children and grown-ups can study several foreign languages simultaneously, starting with Italian+English+Chinese, and adding thereafter other languages one by one: German, Spanish, French etc.

He is the author of the first in Ukraine Chinese language textbook "Chinese for Grown-ups" (2006), which was awarded a laureate prize at the 13th Lviv Book Forum, the international book fair in Ukraine (2006). It is a textbook of a foreign language, which contains besides everyday topics and vocabulary, also topics on Chinese religion, Chinese philosophy and Chinese art of love. A separate chapter of the 936 pages volume is dedicated to the Chinese words and phrases used in today's everyday language. The textbook is illustrated with Chinese colour illustrations. The author believes that besides foreign language textbooks for schoolchildren, students and everybody, there also should be textbooks for adults in which all sides and aspects of the language.

His next book was "Chinese for Everybody Aged from 9 to 209" (2009), a Chinese language textbook, which was nominated among the best books of the year 2009 at the all-Ukrainian competition (this textbook was created together with his son, Derega Roksolan, after a two years' long journey around China, and contains 395 photographs).

In 2010 he published the first in the world textbook of the Chinese language for preschoolers "The Sacred Signs of Heaven", which was awarded a laureate prize at the 17th International Publishers' Lviv Book Forum, Ukraine (2010) and nominated among the best books of the year 2010 at the all-Ukrainian book competition (this textbook was created together with his son Derega Roksolan).

In 2006 he published a monograph on educational system "The Gospel According to Childhood". In this book the author claims the urgent necessity for drastic changes in the schooling system not only in Ukraine, but also in other Western countries. His point is that the main goal of schooling should not be education but spiritual and physical training: first develop body and soul, brains go afterwards. Work (gardening etc.) and play (sports and theatre) must go foremost before reading books or studying special subjects. In 2007-2010 he, together with his son Derega Roksolan, created the first in Ukraine Internet course of the Chinese language on the site High-Way (h.ua).

=== Books ===
- „Китайська грамота для дорослих” (“Chinese for Grown-ups”). Lviv, Decameron-2002, 2006, 924 pp., ISBN 966-96481-0-6
- „Китайська грамота для дітей від 9 до 209” (“Chinese for Everybody”). Lviv, Decameron-2002, 2009, 304 pp., ISBN 966-96481-1-4
- „Знаки неба: китайська мова для дошкільнят” (“The Sacred Signs of Heaven: Chinese for Preschoolers”) [3 vv., 232 pp.], Lviv, Decameron-2002, 2010
- „Євангеліє від дитинства” (“The Gospel According to Childhood”). Lviv, Decameron-2002, 2006, 108 pp.
