= Aaron ha-Levi Oettingen =

Aaron ha-Levi Oettingen was a Galician rabbi; born about the beginning of the eighteenth century; died in Lemberg about 1769. He was one of a prominent family of rabbis, and officiated for the congregations of Javorov and Rzeszów. His father, Ḥayyim Judah Loeb ben Eliezer, was rabbi of Lemberg, as was also his father-in-law, Ḥayyim Cohen Rapoport, author of responsa, ultimately published at Lemberg, 1861. Aaron strongly opposed the Ḥasidism which arose in Galicia, and especially attacked Elimelech of Lezaysk, the author of "No'am Elimelech". His approbations are found in various works of that period.
