= Helena Żygulska-Mach =

Polish ophthalmologist

- Born: 7 January 1926; Lwów, Second Polish Republic (now Ukraine)
- Died: 25 July 2021 (aged 95)
- Education: Medical Academy in Kraków; Jagiellonian University
- Known for: Research in ophthalmology and eye-lens biochemistry
- Awards: Knight's Cross of the Order of Polonia Restituta; Medal of the National Education Commission
- Scientific career
- Fields: Ophthalmology
- Workplaces: Medical Academy in Kraków
- Academic advisors: Marian Wilczek

Helena Żygulska-Mach (7 January 1926 – 25 July 2021) was a Polish ophthalmologist and professor of medicine.

== Biography ==
Born 7 January 1926 in Lwów, she graduated from secondary school in 1943 in her hometown of Lviv through underground education during World War II. She began her medical studies in 1944 at the underground Faculty of Medicine of the Danylo Halytsky Lviv National Medical University. She earned her medical degree in December 1950 at the Medical Academy in Kraków. In 1952, she also obtained a degree in chemistry from the Faculty of Mathematics and Natural Sciences at the Jagiellonian University.

In 1951, she received a doctoral degree in medicine, with her dissertation focusing on "The Effects of Reduced Body Temperature on Carbohydrate Metabolism." Between 1950 and 1959, she worked at the Department of General and Experimental Pathology at the Medical Academy in Kraków. She joined the Department of Ophthalmology in 1954 and completed her first and second specialization degrees in ophthalmology under Marian Wilczek. She completed her habilitation on 16 June 1964, with her thesis titled Congenital Cataract in the Light of Studies on Glutathione, Proteins, and Microelectrophoresis of Soluble Lens Proteins.

After Marian Wilczek's death in 1967, she became the head of the Department and Clinic of Ophthalmology in Kraków, a position she held until her retirement in 1996. She was awarded the title of full professor of medical sciences in 1983 (having been an associate professor since 1973). From 1987 to 1990, she served as Vice-Rector of the Medical Academy in Kraków.

Żygulska-Mach was a member of the Polish Ophthalmological Society, serving as its chairperson from 1986 to 1992. She was also affiliated with several international societies, including the Societé Française d’Ophtalmologie, Julius Hirschberg Gesellschaft, Association for Eye Research, and the International Federation of Ophthalmological Societies. From 1976, she was a member of the Kraków branch of the Polish Academy of Sciences.

Her research contributions include pioneering medical studies in Poland using radioactive isotopes and research on soluble and insoluble proteins in the human lens.

She co-edited the textbook Malignant Melanoma (with J. Skowronek and A. Mackiewicz, Termedia 1998, ISBN 8390832550). She was on the honorary committee of the journal Klinika Oczna. Her clinical and research interests included cataract, biochemistry of the eye lens and vitreous body, and treatment of eye cancers (ophthalmic oncology). One of the achievements of her Kraków team was the introduction of the radioactive cobalt isotope (cobalt bomb) in 1968 for conservative treatment of eye tumors.

She was honored with the Knight's Cross of the Order of Polonia Restituta and the Medal of the National Education Commission.
