= Iryna Morykvas =

Ukrainian illustrator, artist, writer (born 1985)

- Ірина Мориквас
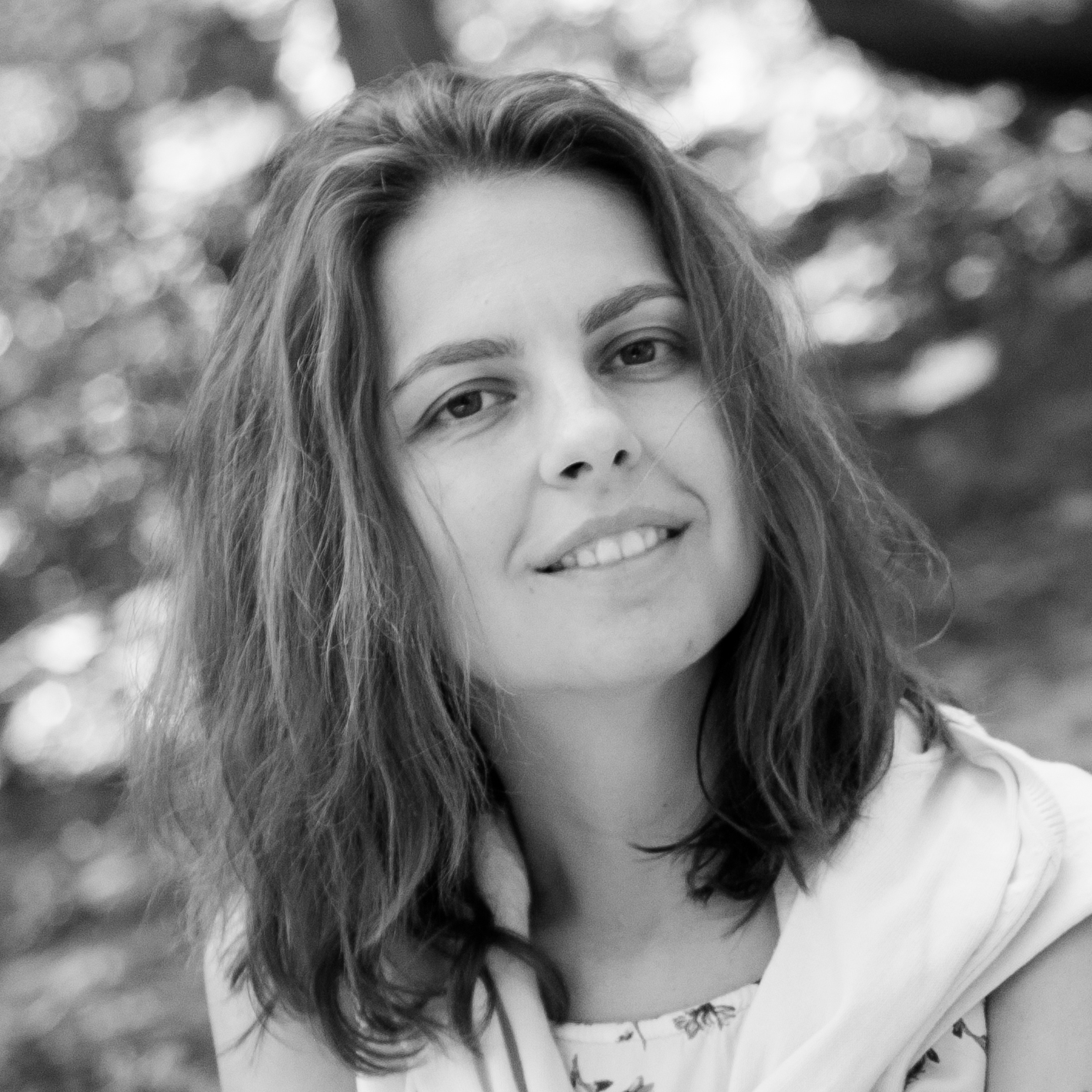
- Born: 18 May 1985 (age 41); Lviv, Ukrainian SSR, Soviet Union
- Education: University of Lviv
- Occupations: Illustrator, artist, writer

Iryna Morykvas (Ukrainian: Ірина Мориквас; born 18 May 1985) is a Ukrainian illustrator, artist, writer.

== Biography ==
Iryna Morykvas was born on 18 May 1985 in Lviv.

She has been painting since she was 20 years old.

She graduated from the Faculty of Journalism at the Ivan Franko National University of Lviv, and Ecumenical Studies at the Ukrainian Catholic University (Master's program).

She is the author of the children's book Mahda and the Wind (2017, A-ba-ba-ha-la-ma-ha), which was shortlisted for the BBC Children's Book of the Year 2017.

In 2022, for World Refugee Day, she created an emoji – a heart with an open door. It was available on Twitter from 19 June to 25 June with the hashtag #withrefugees to support the 100 million people forced to emigrate as a result of war and persecution.

Her works are kept in private collections in Ukraine, Switzerland, France, the Netherlands, Austria, and the Czech Republic.

== Solo exhibitions ==
- Chereshnevyi doshch (2010, Lviv)
- Podarunky na osin (2010, Lviv)
- Akordeon (2010, Lviv)
- Horikhovyi sad (2012, Lviv)
- Zhovtyi avtobus (2013, Lviv)
- Bereh (2019, Lviv)
- Hrusheve lito (2019, Lviv)
- Zyma (2020, Lviv)
- Sady tsvitut (2021, Lviv)

== Awards ==
- 1st place in the contest "Draw a book for children!" by the artistic association "Dzyga" (2007)
- 2nd place in the contest "My Lviv" by the Center for Urban History of East Central Europe
