= Filip Schleicher =

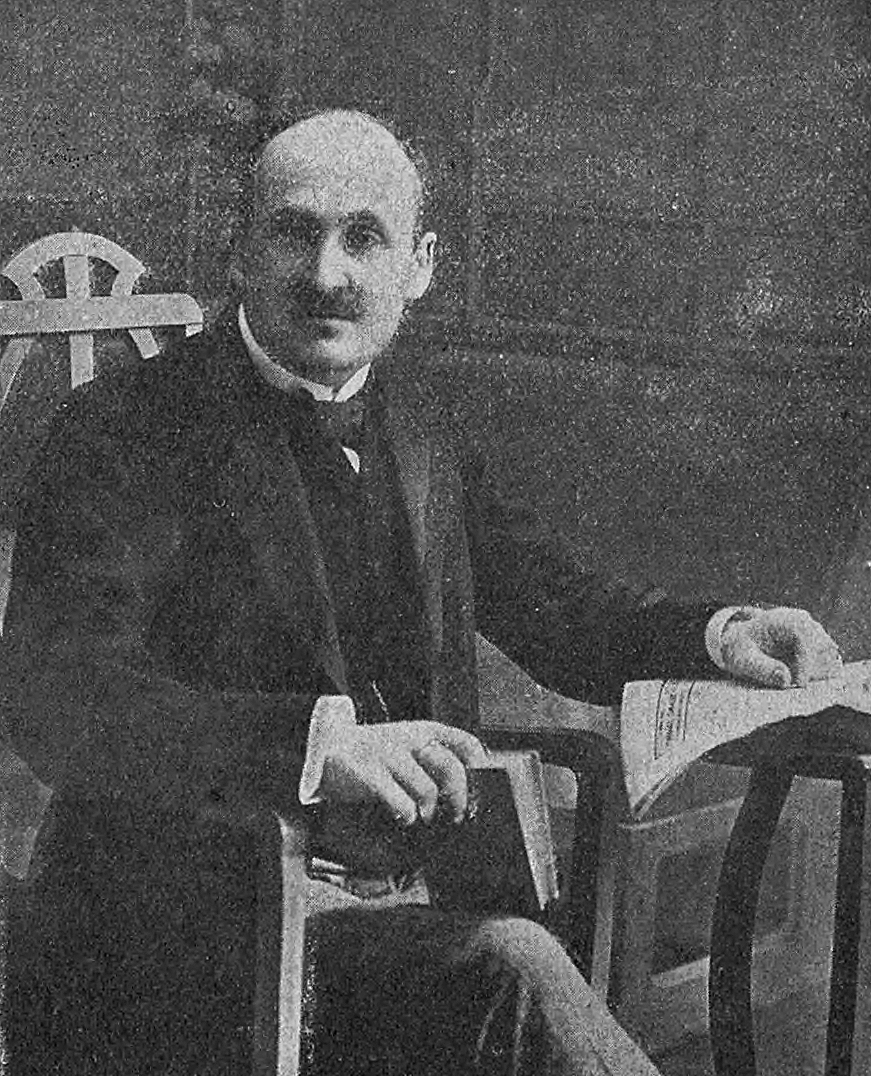
- Filip Schleicher (before 1913)

Personal details
- Born: 1870
- Died: February 22, 1932 (aged 61–62) Lwów, Republic of Poland
- Occupation: Lawyer
- Awards

Filip Schleicher was a Polish-Jewish lawyer and statesman. A doctor of Laws, he served as deputy mayor of the city of Lwów (modern Lviv, Ukraine) between 1913 and 1927. In the 1913 municipal elections to the Lwów city council he was elected a town councillor and subsequently was elected by his peers as a deputy mayor. He served in that capacity even during the 293 days of Russian occupation of that city, as well as the 1918 fights against Ukrainian invasion. He was offered a seat in the government of the West Ukrainian People's Republic, but he refused and remained loyal to Poland. He remained a deputy mayor until 1927.
