= Heinrich Gottfried von Bretschneider =

German officer, author, art collector

- Born: March 6, 1739 Gera, Holy Roman Empire
- Died: November 1, 1810 (aged 71)
- Occupation: Satirical writer

Heinrich Gottfried von Bretschneider (6 March 1739– 1 November 1810 ) was a German satirical writer. Bretschneider was born on 6 March 1739 in Gera. He led a bohemian life, served in the army, and held various political posts. Later he was bibliothecary at Lemberg. He was closely linked to the writers of the enlightenment, especially Friedrich Nicolai. Bretschneider composed, besides satirical writings, Almanach der Heiligen auf das Jahr, 1788, Wallers Leben und Sitten, and the comic epic, Graf Esau. Bretschneider died on 1 November 1810 in Krimitz Pilzno.

== Literature ==
- Anton Peter Petri: Biographisches Lexikon des Banater Deutschtums, Marquartstein, 1992, ISBN 3-922046-76-2
