= Alexander Korb =

German historian (born 1976)

- Born: Alexander Martin Korb; 1976 (age 49–50)

Academic background
- Education: Technische Universität Berlin; Humboldt University of Berlin
- Thesis: In the shadow of World War II (2010)

Academic work
- Discipline: History
- Institutions: University of Leicester; Stanley Burton Centre for Holocaust Studies; Memorium Nuremberg Trials (Dokumentation Center)
- Main interests: modern history; Holocaust; anti-Semitism; Southeast Europe; history of Germany; Historical Geography

Alexander Martin Korb (born 1976) is a German historian specialising in the Holocaust, genocide, anti-Semitism and related mass crimes in Central and Eastern Europe. From 2010 to 2024 Korb was a lecturer in Modern European History at the University of Leicester. Between 2012 and 2018 he served as director of the Stanley Burton Centre for Holocaust Studies. As of June 2024 he is the Director of the Memorium Nuremberg Trials, an information and documentation centre in Nuremberg focused on the history and present-day impact of the Nuremberg Trials.

== Biography ==
Korb studied history and received an M.A. in contemporary and Medieval History from Technische Universität Berlin in 2004, and in gender studies from the Humboldt University of Berlin. In addition, he studied History, Russian and Baltic studies at Charles University Prague, State University Voronezh, Université d'Aix-Marseille, and LMU Munich.

During his research fellowship at the United States Holocaust Memorial Museum in the 2006–2007 academic year, Korb was a PhD candidate in history at Humboldt University. For his doctorate he examined mass violence in the Balkans during World War II. To this end, he spent several months researching the archives of the Yugoslav successor states, Italy, Germany and Israel. He is considered one of the leading European experts on the history of the Second World War in Croatia.

In 2010, Korb was appointed Lecturer in Modern European History at the University of Leicester, he completed his PhD in 2011. He was director of the Stanley Burton Centre for Holocaust and Genocide Studies, a major research center within the university, between 2012 and 2018. Korb held fellowships at Yad Vashem, the Vienna Wiesenthal Institute, the US Holocaust Memorial Museum, the USC Shoah Foundation and the Imre Kertesz Kolleg at the Friedrich Schiller University Jena.

== Selected works ==
=== Books ===
- Korb, A. (2007). Reaktionen der deutschen Bevölkerung auf die Novemberpogrome: im Spiegel amtlicher Berichte [Reactions of the German population to the November pogroms as reflected in official reports] (in German). VDM, Verlag Dr. Müller. ISBN 978-3-8364-4823-9.

Awarded the prize of the Foundation.

- Korb, A. (2013). Im Schatten des Weltkriegs: Massengewalt der Ustaša gegen Serben, Juden und Roma in Kroatien 1941–1945 [In the Shadow of World War II: Ustaša Mass Violence Against Serbs, Jews, and Roma in Croatia 1941–1945]. Studien zur Gewaltgeschichte des 20. Jahrhunderts (in German). Hamburger Edition HIS. ISBN 978-3-86854-576-0.

Awarded, among others, the Fraenkel Prize in Contemporary History of the Wiener Library (London), Irma Rosenberg Prize of the Institute for Contemporary History of the University of Vienna, Andrej Mitrović Prize of the Michael Zikic Foundation (Bonn) and Herbert Steiner Prize of the Documentation Centre of Austrian Resistance and the International Conference of Labor and Social History (Vienna).

- Korb, A.; Cohen, P. (2023). Intertwined Genocides: Mass Violence in Western Yugoslavia During the Second World War. Oxford University Press. ISBN 978-0-19-874514-3.

Awarded The Wiener Holocaust Library's Fraenkel Prize

=== Articles ===
- Homogenizing southeastern Europe, 1912–99: ethnic cleansing in the Balkans revisited (2016)
- Völkisch Journalists in Postwar Germany: Intellectual Continuities in German Journalism, 1930–70 (2015)
- Mastering the Balkans: German, Italian, and Endogenous Population Policies 1941–43 (2010)

== Memberships ==
Positions and memberships:

- Editorial board of Humanities – Sozial und Kulturgeschichte (H-Soz-u-Kult)
- Association of historians in Germany (VHD)
- German History Society (GHS) I
- International Network of Genocide Scholars (INoGS)
- German Association for Historical Peace and Conflict Research (AKHF)
- Working Group on Military History
