= Preis der Stadt Wien für Geisteswissenschaften =

City of Vienna humanities prize

Preis der Stadt Wien für Geisteswissenschaften or Prize of the City of Vienna for the Humanities is a prize awarded by the city of Vienna, Austria, awarded annually since 1947 for outstanding contributions in the humanities. It is worth 10,000 Euros to the winner.

== Award winners ==
The following have won the award:

- 1947: Leopold Wenger
- 1948: Richard Pittioni
- 1949: Friedrich Heer
- 1950: Charles A. Gulick
- 1951: Heinrich Klang
- 1952: Otto Rommel
- 1953: Eduard Castle
- 1954: Robert Reininger
- 1955: Viktor Kraft
- 1956: Fritz Novotny
- 1957: Heinrich Benedikt
- 1958: Kurt Donin
- 1959: Etta Becker-Donner
- 1960: Wilhelm Havers
- 1961: Karl Bühler
- 1962: Josef Keil
- 1963: Rudolf Egger
- 1964: Michael Pfliegler
- 1965: Hugo Hantsch, Karl Popper
- 1966: Otto Erich Deutsch
- 1967: Alfred Verdroß-Droßberg
- 1968: Adolf Merkl
- 1969: Edmund Hlawka
- 1970: Albin Lesky
- 1971: Wilhelm Mrazek
- 1972: Friedrich Nowakowski
- 1973: Eduard März
- 1974: Heinz Politzer
- 1975: Robert A. Kann
- 1976: Renate Wagner-Rieger
- 1977: Hermann Vetters
- 1978: Stephan Verosta
- 1979: Herbert Hunger
- 1980: Kurt Rothschild
- 1981: Eva Frodl-Kraft
- 1982: Karl Stadler
- 1983: Eduard Sekler
- 1984: Adam Wandruszka
- 1985: Wilhelm Weber
- 1986: Ernst Gombrich
- 1987: Erich Heintel
- 1988: Fritz Schwind
- 1989: Walter Kraus
- 1990: Heinrich Appelt
- 1991: Erich Zöllner
- 1992: Werner Hofmann
- 1993: Marie Albu-Jahoda
- 1994: Erika Weinzierl
- 1995: Adolf Holl
- 1996: Michael Mitterauer
- 1997: Wendelin Schmidt-Dengler
- 1998: Leopold Rosenmayr
- 1999: Norbert Leser
- 2000: Erich Streissler
- 2001: Ruth Wodak
- 2002: Helmut Konrad
- 2003: Manfried Welan
- 2004: Gerald Stourzh
- 2005: Anton Pelinka
- 2006: Christiane Spiel
- 2007: Manfred Wagner
- 2008: Helga Nowotny
- 2009: Herta Nagl
- 2010: Alfred Springer
- 2011: Ingrid Cella
- 2012: Oliver Rathkolb
- 2013: Herbert Hausmaninger
- 2014: Konrad Paul Liessmann
- 2015: Andre Gingrich
- 2016: Wolfgang Lutz
- 2017: Herlinde Pauer-Studer
- 2018: Manfred Nowak
- 2019: Verena Winiwarter
- 2020: Gabriella Hauch
- 2021: Clemens Jabloner
