= Anton Pelinka =

Austrian political scientist (1941–2025)

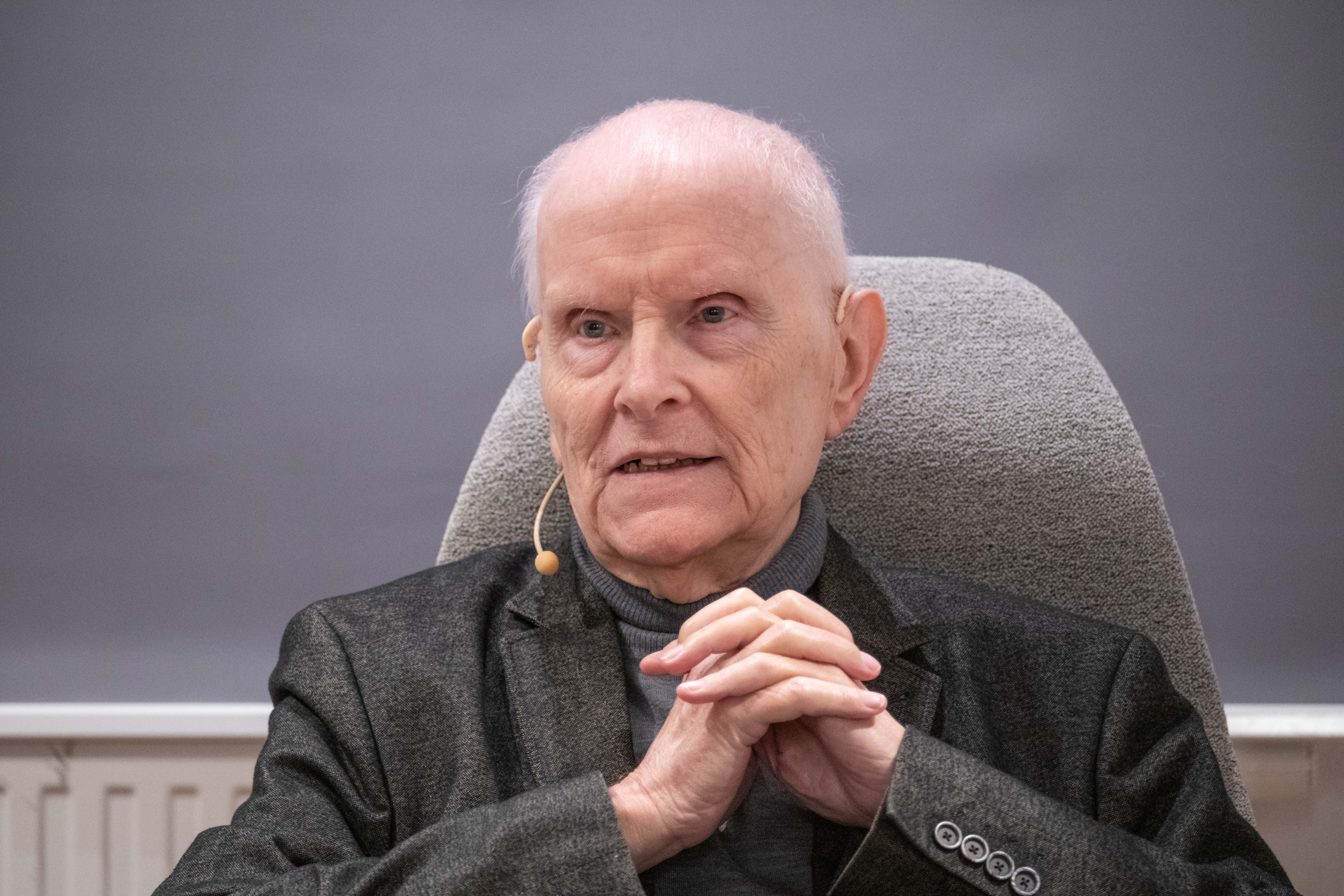
- Pelinka in 2024
- Born: 14 October 1941; Vienna, Nazi Germany
- Died: 3 October 2025 (aged 83); Innsbruck, Austria
- Citizenship: Austrian
- Education: University of Vienna
- Scientific career
- Fields: Political science, nationalism studies
- Workplaces: Central European University; University of Innsbruck; Jawaharlal Nehru University; University of New Orleans; Stanford University; University of Michigan; Harvard University

Anton Pelinka (14 October 1941 – 3 October 2025) was an Austrian political scientist and academic. He was a professor of political science and nationalism studies at the English-speaking Central European University of Budapest. Prior to this appointment, Pelinka was a professor of political science at the University of Innsbruck, one of Austria's largest universities. During his career he also served as a dean, with his most recent tenure in this role occurring between the years of 2004 and 2006 when he was dean of the Faculty of Political Science and Sociology at the University of Innsbruck.

== Life and career ==
Pelinka was born in the Austrian capital city of Vienna. After completing studies in jurisprudence at the University of Vienna (Ph.D 1964) as well as Political Science at the Institute for Advanced Studies, he worked for the weekly Newspaper "Die Furche". His first academic job was as an assistant. He returned to the Institute for Advanced Studies, whose principal at the time was the Austrian-American historian Ernst Florian Winter. In 1971, he went to Salzburg where he received his Habilitation a year later. Afterwards he went to Germany and became a Professor in Essen and Berlin. In 1975, he got a permanent professorial chair at the University of Innsbruck. He was a visiting professor at many universities abroad. In 1977 he was at the Jawaharlal Nehru University in New Delhi. In the United States he went to the University of New Orleans in 1981, to the Stanford University in 1997 and to the University of Michigan in Ann Arbor from 2001 to 2002. During this time he also visited the Université Libre de Bruxelles. He was also at Harvard University (1990 to 1991) and the Collegium Budapest (1994) for the purpose of research.

In October 2004, Pelinka was appointed a full professor at the University of Innsbruck. On 1 January 2005 he was selected as dean of the new Faculty of Political Science and Sociology. He held this position until his move to the Central European University of Budapest.

Pelinka was also head of the Society for Political Education and a regular commentator for major newspapers and media channels in Austria and several other countries.

In addition to his activities as a scientist he was Austria's representative in a commission against racism and xenophobia in the European Union during the 1990s.

After Pelinka reproached Jörg Haider for playing down National Socialism in the Italian television in 1999, Haider sued him for defamation. In 2001, Pelinka was found not liable.

Grave of Anton Pelinka at the Vienna Central Cemetery

Pelinka died on 3 October 2025, at the age of 83.

== Scientific research and doctrine ==
WorldCat (Worldcat Identities) lists none the less nine of his works which achieved a global library presence of more than 300 global libraries. Pelinka published on a very wide range of topics in contemporary political science. OCLC Classify suggests that his most widely circulated works deal with Prejudice (Handbook of prejudice), Global Austria (Global Austria : Austria's place in Europe and the world), Austria : out of the shadow of the past, peace research (Friedensforschung, Konfliktforschung, Demokratieforschung ein Handbuch), Social democracy (Social democratic parties in Europe), the Haider phenomenon in Austria, the challenge of ethnic conflict, democracy, and self-determination in Central Europe, Austrian historical memory & national identity, and Democracy in India (Democracy Indian style : Subhas Chandra Bose and the creation of India's political culture). Pelinka's main emphases are on democratic theories, political systems and political culture in Austria and the comparative research on parties and associations. He was a leading international expert on topics like right-wing extremism and xenophobia in society. Between 1965 and 2019, Pelinka published 92 scholarly articles in major peer reviewed journals of political science, documented at the Columbia University New York Library.

== Work ==
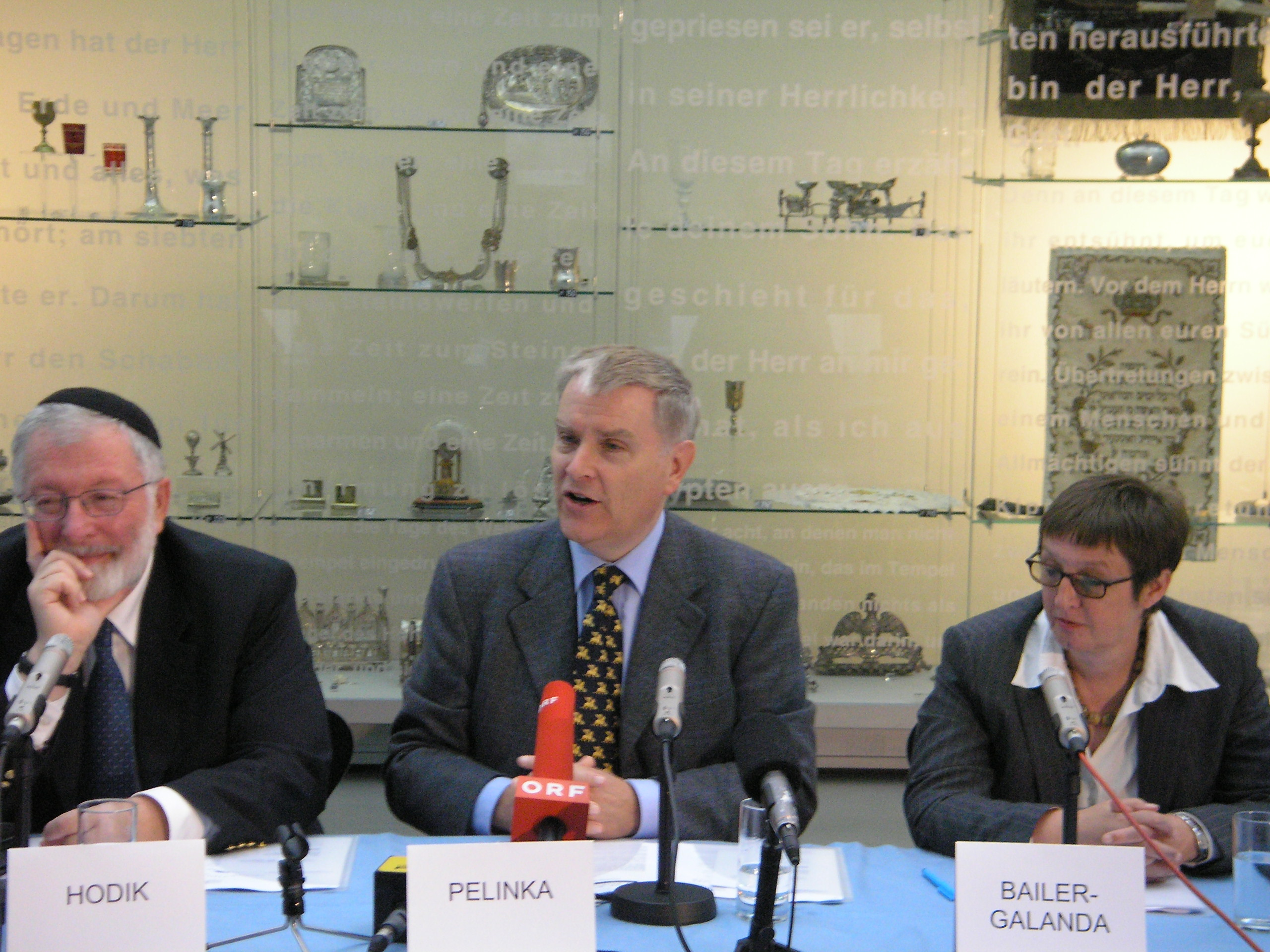
Pelinka at a news-conference in the Jewish Museum Vienna. Also present from the left is Dr. Ingo Zechner, the former general-secretary Avshalom Hodik of the Jewish Community, Brigitte Bailer-Galanda of the Documentation Centre of Austrian Resistance, and the historian Bertrand Perz. The occasion was the founding of a Vienna Wiesenthal Institute for Holocaust Studies (VWI).

Pelinka authored several publications dealing with topics of interest, especially the Austrian political system. In "Fünf Fragen an drei Generationen. Der Antisemitismus und wir heute" (Five questions to three generations. Anti-semitism and us today), he discusses the historical changes in Austrian society. He was co-editor, with Ruth Wodak, of Austrian journal, "The Haider Phenomenon". It deals with the rise of the Austrian Freedom Party (FPÖ) under the chairmanship of Jörg Haider and further the impact of parties and economical or social factors on society.

== Bibliography (selection) ==
Democratical Theories

- Dynamische Demokratie. Zur konkreten Utopie gesellschaftlicher Gleichheit. (Dynamic Democracy. The Concrete Utopia of Social Equality) Stuttgart 1974.
- Politics of the Lesser Evil: Leadership, Democracy, and Jaruelski's Poland, Frankfurt am Main 1996.
- Demokratie in Indien. Subhas Chandra Bose und das Werden der politischen Kultur. (Democracy in India: Subhas Chandra Bose and the creation of India's political culture). Innsbruck 2005.

Political System and Political Culture in Austria

- The Haider Phenomenon. New Brunswick (NJ) 2001
- Austria in the European Union (Contemporary Austrian Studies)
- Global Austria: Austria's Place in Europe and the World (Contemporary Austrian Studies)

== Awards ==
- 1998: Willy und Helga Verkauf-Verlon Preis des DÖW (Willy and Helga Verkauf-Verlon Award from the Documentation Center of Austrian Resistance)
- 2005: Preis der Stadt Wien für Geisteswissenschaften (Award for Humanities from the City of Vienna)
