= King of Hungary =

Monarch of the Kingdom of Hungary (1000–1918)

Apostolic King of Hungary
- Magyarország apostoli királya
- Royal coat of arms

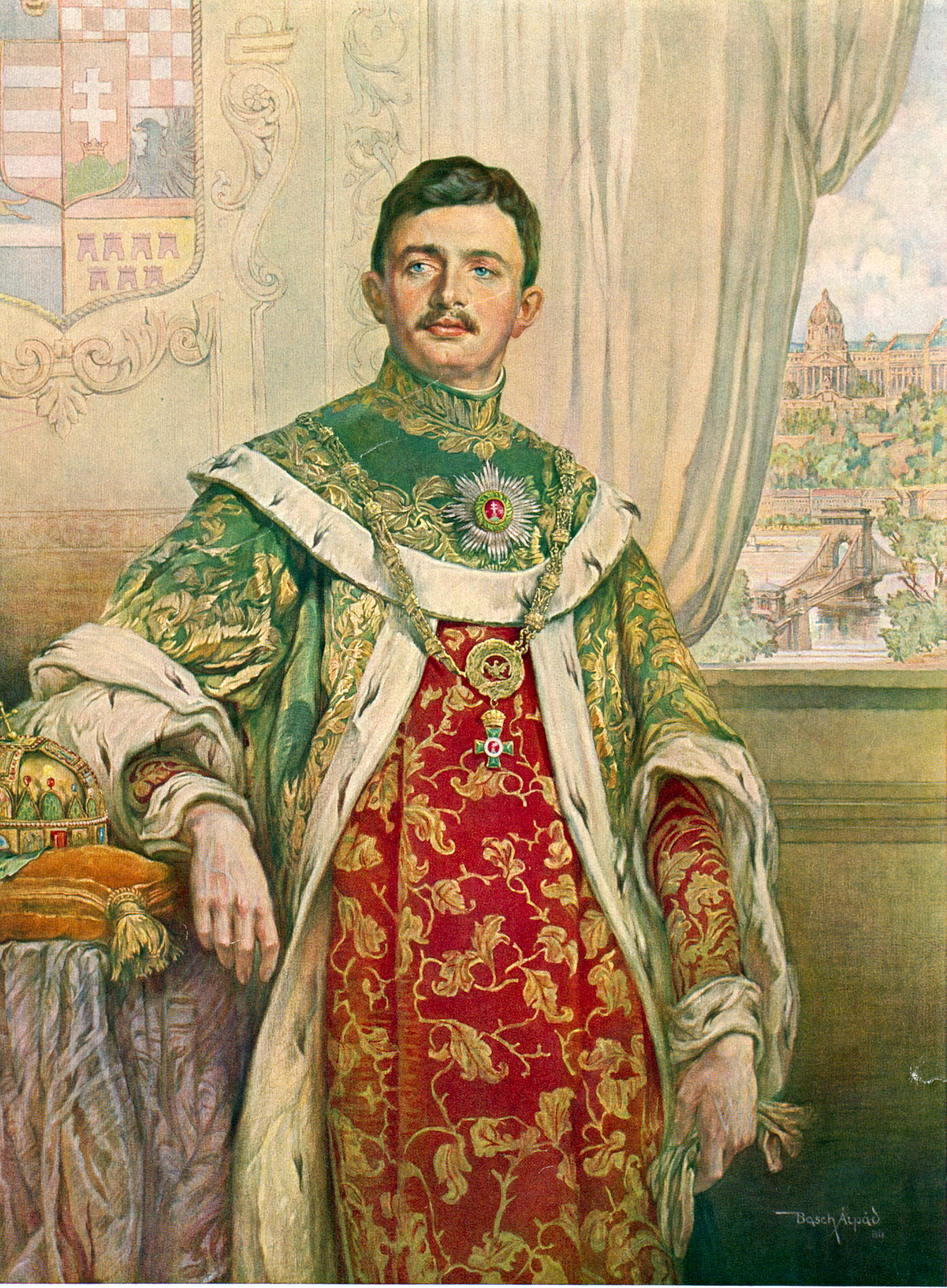
- Last to reign Charles IV; 21 November 1916 – 13 November 1918

Details
- Style: His Apostolic Majesty
- First monarch: Stephen I
- Last monarch: Charles IV
- Formed: 25 December 1000
- Abolished: 16 November 1918
- Residences: Buda Castle; Bratislava Castle; Castle of Diósgyőr
- Appointer: Primogeniture; Royal Diet
- Pretender: Karl von Habsburg

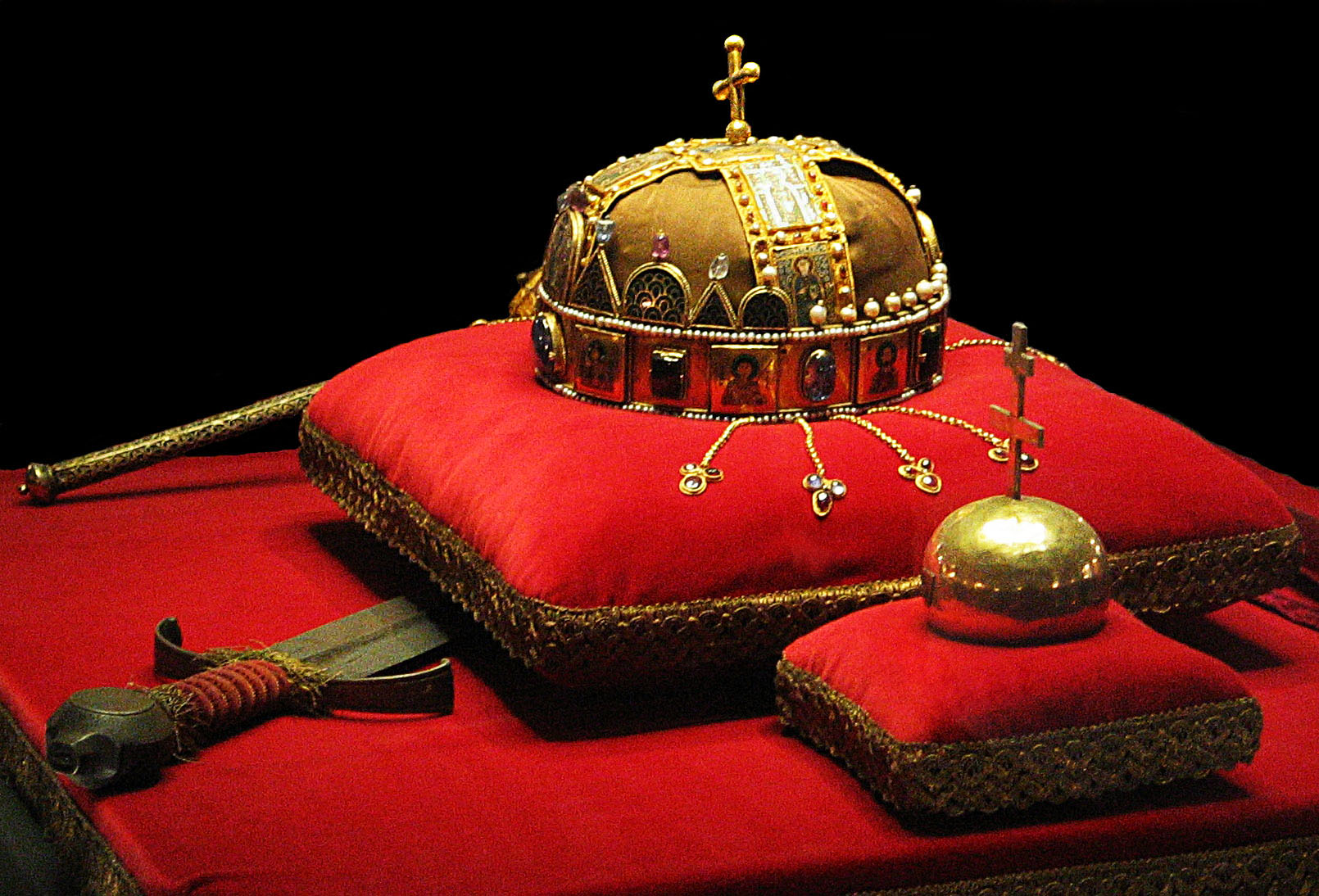
Crown Jewels of Hungary

The King of Hungary (Hungarian: Magyarország királya) was the ruling head of state of the Kingdom of Hungary from 1000 (or 1001) to 1918. The style of title "Apostolic King of Hungary" (Magyarország apostoli királya) was endorsed by Pope Clement XIII in 1758 and used afterwards by all monarchs of Hungary.

== Establishment of the title ==
Before 1000 AD, Hungary was not yet recognized as a kingdom by the Pope and the ruler of Hungary was styled Grand Prince of the Hungarians. The first King of Hungary, Stephen I. was crowned on 25 December 1000 (or 1 January 1001 in the proleptic calendar) with the crown Pope Sylvester II had sent him and with the consent of Otto III, Holy Roman Emperor.

Following King Stephen I's coronation, all the monarchs of Hungary and the Árpád dynasty used the title "King". However, not all rulers of Hungary were kings—for example, Stephen Bocskai and Francis II Rákóczi were proclaimed rulers as "High Princes of Hungary", and there were also three Governors of Hungary who were sometimes styled "regents", János Hunyadi, Lajos Kossuth and Miklós Horthy.

=== Legal requirements for a coronation to be legitimate ===
From the 13th century on, a process was established to confirm the legitimacy of the King. No person could become the legitimate King of Hungary without fulfilling the following criteria:

- Coronation by the Archbishop of Esztergom
- Coronation with the Holy Crown of Hungary
- Coronation at Székesfehérvár Basilica

This meant a certain level of protection to the integrity of the Kingdom. For example, stealing the Holy Crown of Hungary was no longer enough to become legitimate King.

The first requirement (coronation by the Archbishop of Esztergom) was confirmed by Béla III, who had been crowned by Archbishop Berthold of Kalocsa, based on the special authorisation of Pope Alexander III. After his coronation he declared that this coronation would not affect the customary claim of the Archbishop of Esztergom to crown the king. In 1211, Pope Innocent III refused to confirm the agreement of Archbishop John of Esztergom and Archbishop Berthold of Kalocsa on the transfer of the claim, and he declared that only the Archbishop of Esztergom was entitled to crown the King of Hungary.

King Charles I of Hungary was crowned in May 1301 with a provisional crown in Esztergom by the Archbishop of that city; this led to his second coronation in June 1309. At that time the Holy Crown was not used, and he was crowned in Buda by the Archbishop of Esztergom. However, his final third coronation was in 1310, in Székesfehérvár, with the Holy Crown and by the Archbishop of Esztergom. Then the King's coronation was considered absolutely legitimate.

On the other hand, in 1439, the dowager queen Elizabeth of Luxemburg ordered one of her handmaidens to steal the Holy Crown from the palace of Visegrád, and then promoted the coronation of her newborn son Ladislaus V, which was carried out legitimately in Székesfehérvár by the Archbishop of Esztergom.

A similar situation occurred with Matthias Corvinus, when he negotiated for return of the Holy Crown, which was in the possession of Frederick III, Holy Roman Emperor. After it was returned, Matthias was legitimately crowned.

=== Inheriting the throne ===
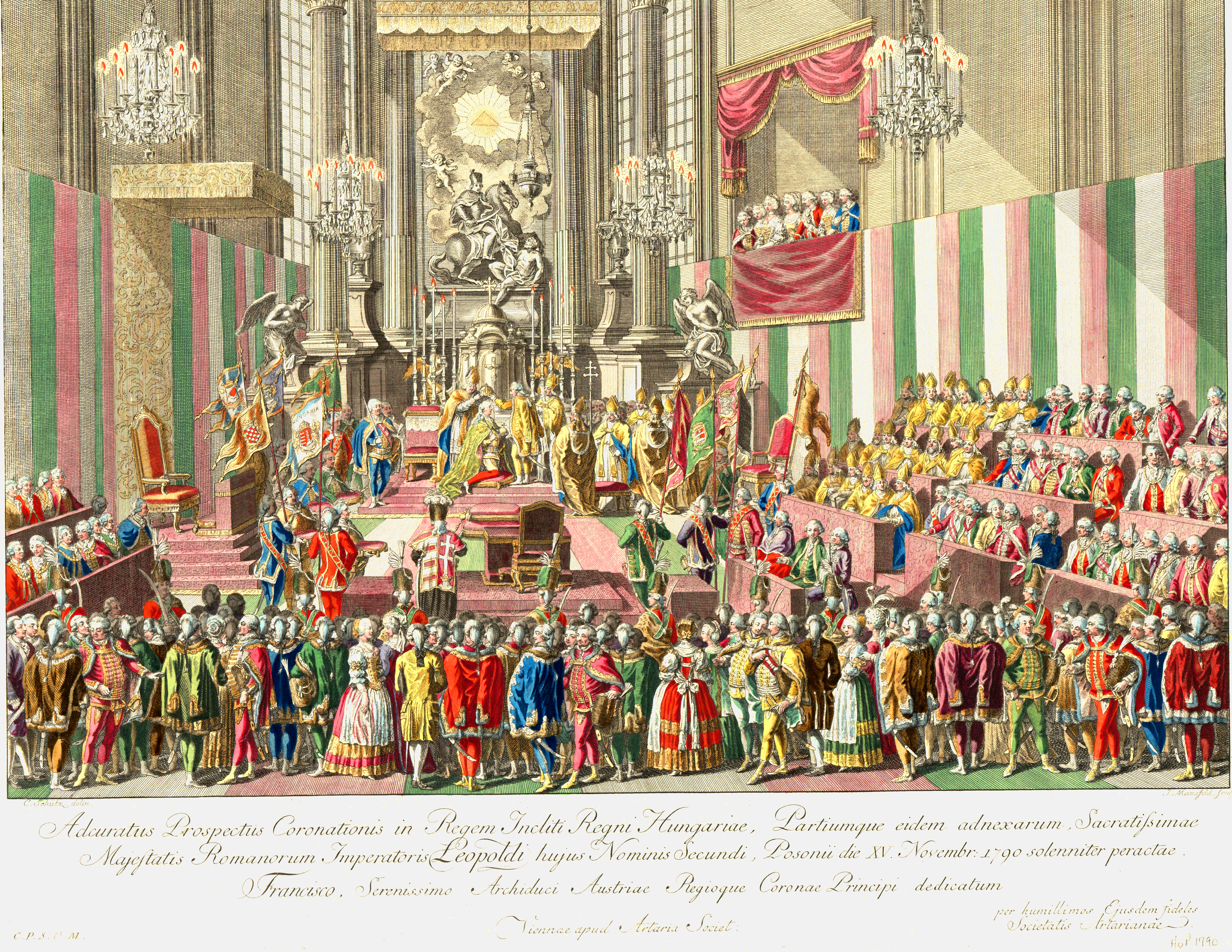
The coronation of Leopold II at St. Martin's Cathedral in 1790, in Pozsony, site of Hungarian coronations between 1563 and 1830. Engraving by Carl Schütz.

As in all the traditional monarchies, the heir descended through the male line from a previous King of Hungary. In accordance with Hungarian tradition, this right usually passed to younger brothers, before passing to the son of the previous King, which caused family disputes on many occasions. The founder of the first Hungarian royal house was Árpád, who led his people into the Carpathian Basin in 895. His descendants, who ruled for more than 400 years, included Saint Stephen I, Saint Ladislaus I, Andrew II, and Béla IV. In 1301 the last member of the House of Árpád died, and Charles I was crowned, claiming the throne in the name of his paternal grandmother Mary, the daughter of Stephen V. With the death of Mary, the granddaughter of Charles I, in 1395, the direct line was interrupted again, and Mary's husband Sigismund continued reigning, after being elected by the nobility of the Kingdom in the name of the Holy Crown.

Later, Matthias Corvinus was elected by the nobles of the Kingdom, being the first Hungarian monarch who descended from an aristocratic family, and not from a royal family that inherited the title. The same happened decades later with John Zápolya, who was elected in 1526 after the death of Louis II in the battle of Mohács.

After this, the House of Habsburg inherited the throne, and ruled Hungary from Austria for almost 400 years until 1918. Admiral Horthy was appointed regent in 1920, but Charles IV of Hungary's attempts to retake the throne were unsuccessful. The monarchy of Hungary was formally abolished on 1 February 1946 on the establishment of the Second Hungarian Republic.

== See also ==
- Apostolic Majesty
- Grand Prince of the Hungarians
- Lands of the Crown of Saint Stephen
- Regent of Hungary
- List of Hungarian monarchs
