= Pelinka =

Pelinka is a surname. Notable people with the surname include:

- Anton Pelinka (1941–2025), Austrian political scientist
- Rob Pelinka (born 1969), American lawyer, basketball executive, and former player
