= Austrian Mauthausen Committee =

The Austrian Mauthausen Committee is responsible for scientific and educational work concerning the Mauthausen-Gusen concentration camp and its satellite camps in Austria. This association was founded in 1997 and is the subsequent organisation of the Austrian Concentration Camp Community Mauthausen.

== Definition ==
The Mauthausen Committee defines itself as follows:

"Our association is nonpartisan and nonreligious. We stand for a free and democratic society and for the protection of human rights for everybody, without regarding their nationality, political views or religious views. We are working to prevent every form of fascism, racism, Neo-Nazism, chauvinism and antisemitism."

== Work ==
With these sorts of standards, the Committee does work concerning the memorial of NS-dictatorship and the reprocessing of it. It focuses on work with young people and cares about educational and scientific maintenance of the Mauthausen concentration camp and its satellite camps. A European Youth Meeting Centre is being planned.

As part of the „Comité International de Mauthausen", the Austrian Mauthausen Committee has intense contacts with various partner-organisations, for example the "Amicale de Mauthausen in Paris" and organises various commemorations.

The committee has a few sub-organisations in various counties of Austria to possess a kind of network and to commemorate the satellite camps of Mauthausen in Austria.

== Administration ==
- Curatorium: Christoph Schönborn, Erich Foglar, Oskar Deutsch, Ernst Nedwed, Gerhard Kastelic, Michael Bünker, Arsenios Kardamakis, Nicolae Dura, Rudolf Hundstorfer, Michael Häupl, Josef Pühringer, Rudolf Sarközi, Katja Sturm-Schnabl, Kurt Krickler, Brigitte Bailer, Hannah Lessing, Franz Vranitzky, Erhard Busek, Erika Weinzierl, Richard Schreiber, Helmut Schüller and Philipp Jost;

== Publications ==
There is a magazine named Edition Mauthausen.

== Distinctions ==
The Austrian Mauthausen Committee was honored with the Karl-Renner-Award in December 2013. Co-recipients were founder of the Austrian Holocaust Memorial Service Andreas Maislinger and Irene Suchy. Oliver Rathkolb delivered the laudatio.
