= Rupnow =

Rupnow is a surname. Notable people with the surname include:

- Dirk Rupnow (born 1972), German historian
- Natalie Rupnow, perpetrator in the 2024 Abundant Life Christian School shooting in Madison, Wisconsin, United States
