= Etta Becker-Donner =

Austrian ethnologist (1911–1975)

Etta Becker-Donner (born December 5, 1911 in Vienna, Austria-Hungary as Violetta Donner; died 25 September 1975 in Vienna) was an Austrian ethnologist.

== Life ==
Etta Donner studied ethnology and African linguistics at the University of Vienna.

In 1934, the then 22-year-old Donner made her first trip to Liberia, and in 1936 and 1937 she made a second trip.

In 1941, the year of the war, she married the American expert Hans Becker, who was transferred to Chile in 1947 for work. Becker-Donner also changed her research focus to Latin America. After her husband's death in 1948, she returned to Vienna.

In 1954 she undertook her first expedition to Brazil. She went on further trips to Costa Rica and Guatemala. South American art was the focus. Research trips also took place to China, the US and the Soviet Union. She usually carried out these trips without European travel companions and was usually only with local guides or interpreters.

In 1955 she took over the management of the then independent Ethnological Museum Vienna, which she already knew because she had been employed there as a research assistant from 1938. She was the director of the museum for 20 years and during this time she expanded the area of special exhibitions and events.

But her work also extended into development policy. She was one of the founders of the Latin America Institute in Vienna. She was buried in the Hietzinger Friedhof.

Her daughter is the artist and poet Franka Lechner.

== Works (excerpt) ==
- The Acrobats of the Snake League, 1936
- Togba, a Woman's Society in Liberia, 1938
- —, Winifred M. Deans (transl.): Hinterland Liberia. (English), London 1939, reprint New York 1977, OBV
- Indian painting from the United States. Contemporary Indian paintings, handicrafts, everyday objects, exhibition catalogue, 1958
- Pre-Columbian Painting, 1962
- Masterpieces of Korean art. Exhibition organized by the Federal Ministry of Education, May 18, 1962 - June 30, 1962, exhibition catalog, 1962
- Folk woodcuts from NE Brazil, exhibition catalog (introduction), 1962
- Central America, Mexico. Peoples and cultures, special exhibition 1964, (exterior shots), 1964
- The Language of Mano, 1965
- Guatemala and its folk art, special exhibition spring 1967, Museum of Ethnology, (exterior photos), 1967
- Peru. Exhibition 1968, Schloßmuseum Matzen, (text), 1968
- Brazil's Indians, 1969

== Awards ==
- 1959: Prize of the City of Vienna for the Humanities
- 2011/12: Science Adventures: Etta Becker-Donner in Africa and Latin America. Exhibition in the Museum of Ethnology Vienna Adventure Science: Etta Becker-Donner in Africa and Latin America.

== Literature ==
- Becker-Donner, Violetta [Etta]. In: Bettina Beer: Women in German-speaking ethnology. A manual. Cologne: Böhlau, 2007, ISBN 978-3-412-11206-6, pp. 28–34.
- Christian F. Feest: Etta Becker-Donner (1911–1975) in Indiana. 1977, pp. 265–268.
- Brigitte Fuchs: Etta Becker-Donner. In: Brigitta Keintzel, Ilse Korotin (ed.): Women scientists in and from Austria. Life - work - impact. Böhlau, Vienna/Cologne/Weimar 2002, ISBN 3-205-99467-1, pp. 53–55.
- Hans Manndorff: In Memoriam Etta Becker-Donner in Wiener ethnological communications, 1976
- Hans Manndorff: "In Memoriam Dr. Etta Becker-Donner" in Notices of the Anthropological Society in Vienna 108, 1978
