= Bertrand Perz =

Austrian historian of modern age

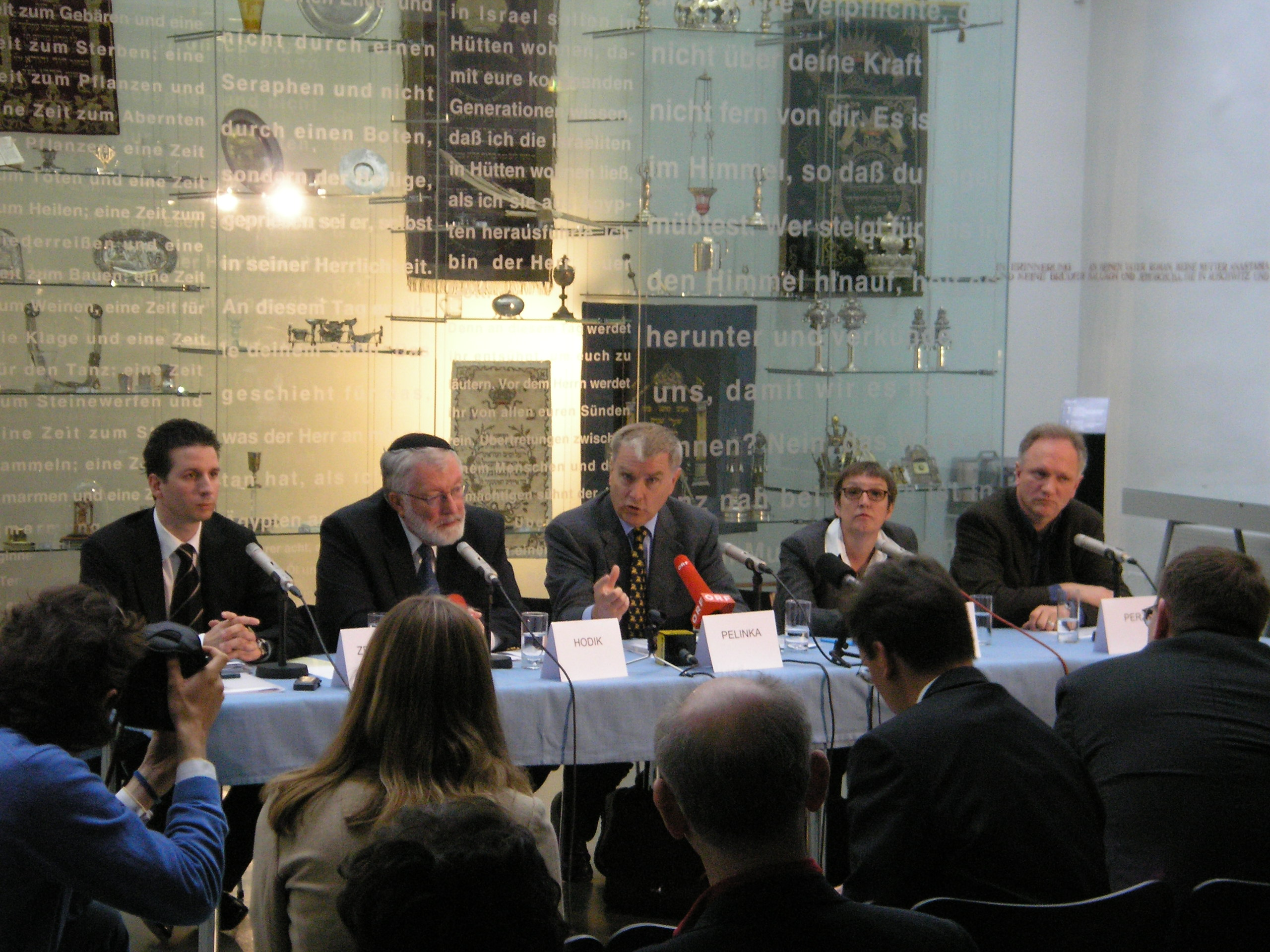
Bertrand Perz (right) at the press conference announcing the Vienna Wiesenthal Institute for Holocaust Studies in June 2006

Bertrand Perz is an Austrian academic who is known for his research into Mauthausen concentration camp.

== Works ==
- Perz, Bertrand (1991). Projekt Quarz: Steyr-Daimler-Puch und das Konzentrationslager Melk. Industrie, Zwangsarbeit und Konzentrationslager in Österreich (in German). Vol. 3. Verlag für Gesellschaftskritik. ISBN 978-3-85115-115-2. Reprinted by Studienverlag (2014) ISBN 978-3-7065-4185-5
- Perz, Bertrand (2006). Die KZ-Gedenkstätte Mauthausen: 1945 bis zur Gegenwart (in German). StudienVerlag. ISBN 978-3-7065-4025-4.
