= Aubrey Newman (historian) =

British historian (born 1927)

Aubrey N. Newman (born 14 December 1927, London) is a British historian who has written widely on the topic of Anglo-Jewish history. Newman served as a professor at the University of Leicester, where he founded the Stanley Burton Centre for Holocaust Studies. He served two terms as President of the Jewish Historical Society of England.

== Publications ==
- (Editor) Migration and settlement : proceedings of the Anglo-American Jewish Historical Conference held in London jointly by the Jewish Historical Society of England and the American Jewish Historical Society, July 1970 (London: Jewish Historical Society of England, 1971)
- (Editor) Provincial Jewry in Victorian Britain : papers for a conference at University College, London convened by the Jewish Historical Society of England (London: Jewish Historical Society of England, 1975)
- (Editor) The Jewish East End, 1840-1939 (London: Jewish Historical Society of England, 1981)
- The Holocaust. We Must Never Forget, Nor Allow It To Happen Again (London, 2002)
- (co-edited with Barbara Butler) A Sacred Memory. Lectures in Honour of Elchanan and Miriam Elkes (Leicester, 2003)
- (Co-Authored with N. J. Evans, S. Isroff & G Smith) Jewish migration to South Africa: the records of the Poor Jews' Temporary Shelter 1885-1914 (Cape Town: University of Cape Town, 2006)
- (Edited with Bernard Wasserstein and Kenneth Collins) Two Hundred Years of Scottish Jewry (Glasgow: Scottish Jewish Archives Centre, 2018)
