= Norbert Leser =

Austrian jurist, political scientist and philosopher

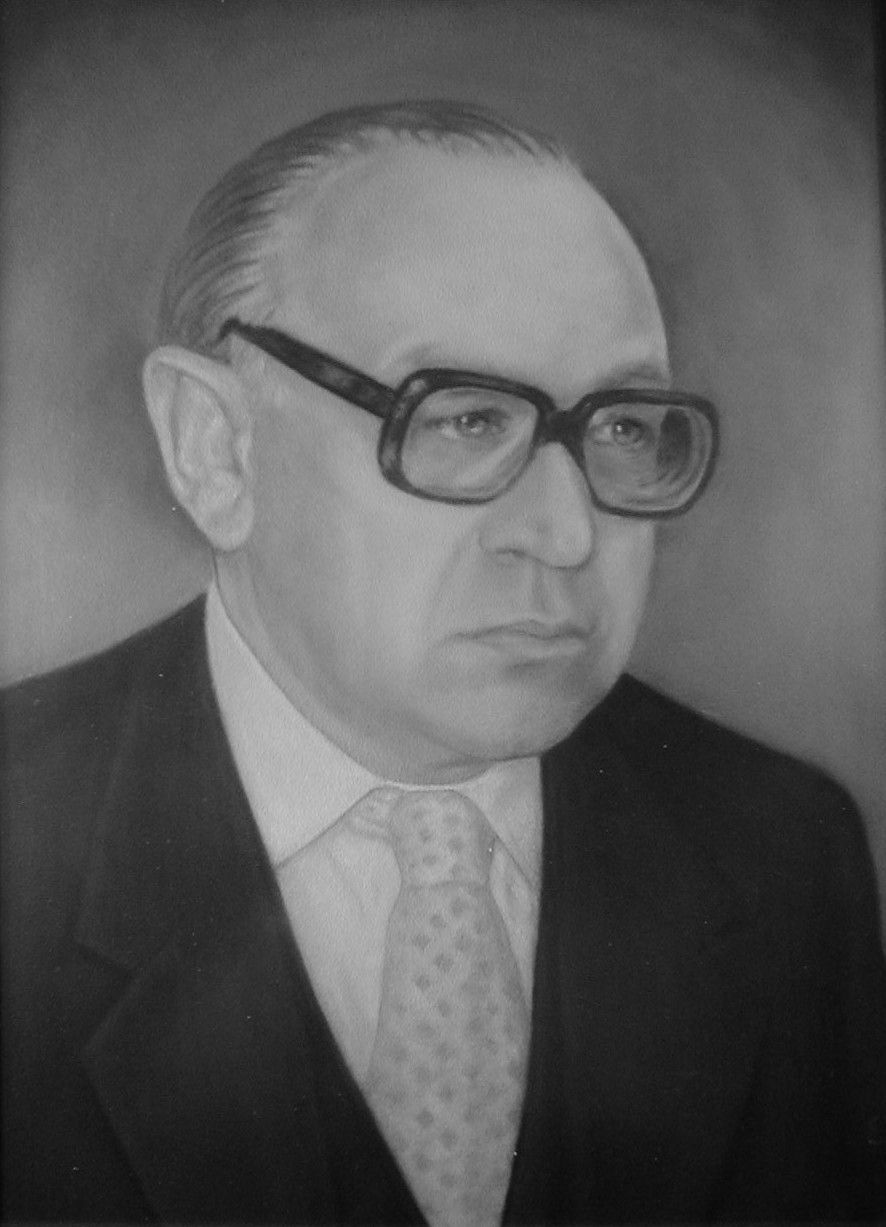
Norbert Leser, Painting by Ernst Bader 1987.

Norbert Leser (May 31, 1933 – December 31, 2014) was an Austrian Catholic jurist, political scientist and social philosopher best known for his lifelong affiliation with, and critical work on, the Social Democratic Party of Austria and Austromarxism in particular. He was born in Oberwart and died in Eisenstadt.

Leser's Habilitation thesis, Between Reformism and Bolshevism, first published in 1968, is considered a standard work on Austromarxism.

== Bibliography ==
- Zwischen Reformismus und Bolschewismus. Der Austromarxismus in Theorie und Praxis (1968, 2nd ed. 1985)
- Die Odyssee des Marxismus (1971)
- Austro-Marxism: A Reappraisal, in: Journal of Contemporary History, vol. 11 (July 1976), pp. 133–148
- Jenseits von Marx und Freud (1980)
- Das geistige Leben Wiens in der Zwischenkriegszeit (1981)
- Grenzgänger, 2 vols. (1981–82)
- Sozialphilosophie (1984)
- Genius Austriacus (1986)
- Salz der Gesellschaft (1988)
- Von Leser zu Leser (1992)
- Elegie auf Rot (1998)
- "... auf halben Wegen und zu halber Tat ...". Politische Auswirkungen einer österreichischen Befindlichkeit (2000)
- Gottes Türen und Fenster (2001)
- Zeitzeuge an Kreuzwegen (2003).
- Der Sturz des Adlers. 120 Jahre österreichische Sozialdemokratie (2008)

== Decorations and awards ==
- 1967: Dr. Karl Renner Journalism Prize of the Austrian Journalists Club
- Theodor Innitzer Prize
- Austrian Cross of Honour for Science and Art, 1st class
- 1992: Corresponding member of the Austrian Academy of Sciences
- 1999: City of Vienna Prize for Humanities
- Norbert Leser carries further the honour band of Catholic Austrian Landsmannschaft K.Ö.L. Maximiliana Wien

== See also ==
- Habsburg myth
- Studentenverbindung
