= Dirk Rupnow =

German historian (born 1972)

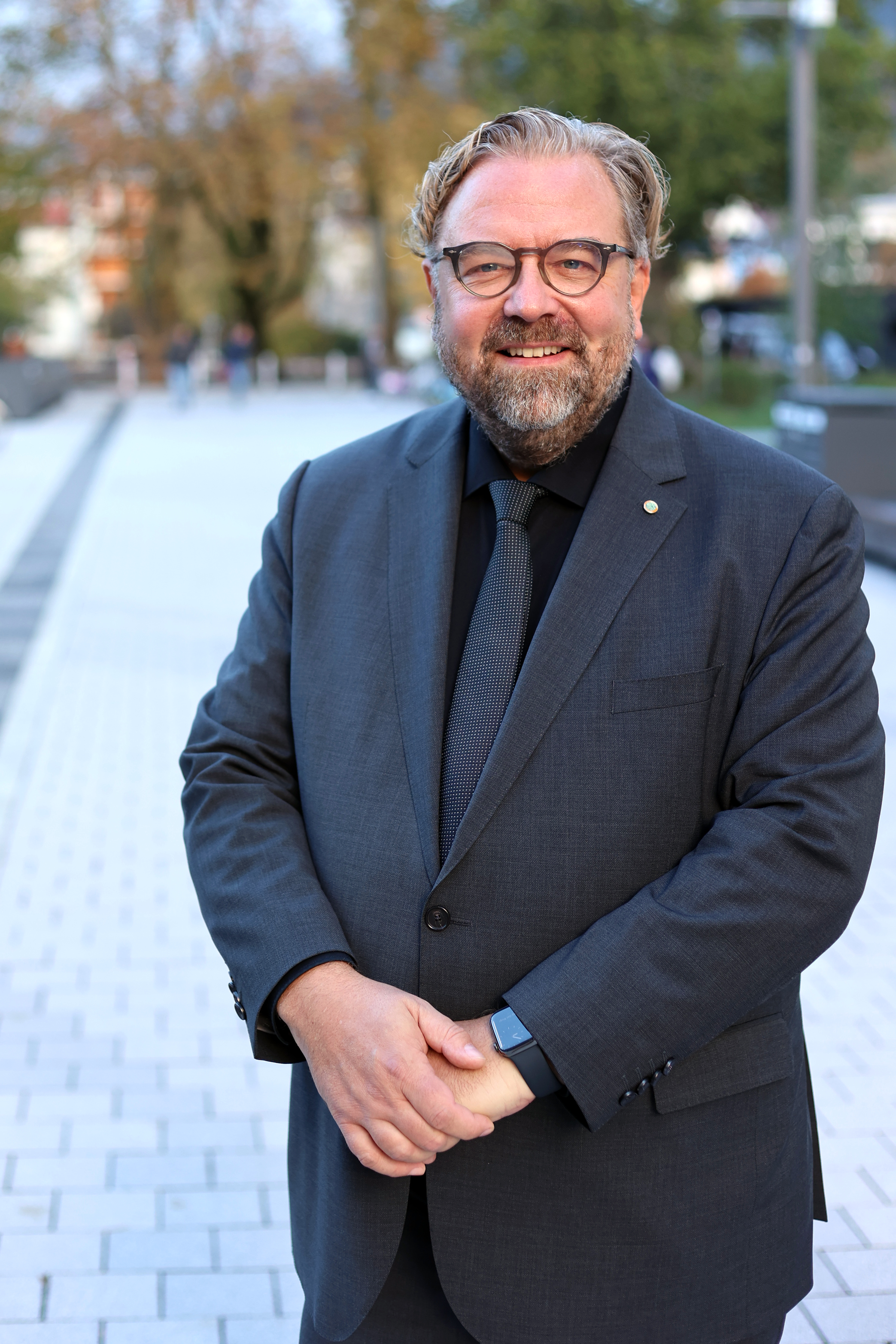
- Dirk Rupnow, 2025
- Born: 1972 (age 53–54); Berlin, Germany
- Occupation: Historian

Dirk Rupnow (born 1972 in Berlin, Germany) is a German historian. Since 2009 he has taught as assistant professor, since 2013 as full professor at the University of Innsbruck, Austria, since 2010 he has been head of the institute for contemporary history there. From March 2018 to 2025, he was Dean of the Faculty of Philosophy and History, before being appointed Vice-Rector for Human Resources in November 2025.

== Life ==
Rupnow studied history, German literature, philosophy and art history at the Free University Berlin and the University of Vienna. He completed his studies in Vienna 1999. 2002 he received his PhD from the University of Klagenfurt, Austria. In 2009 he completed his Habilitation at the University of Vienna. 1999/2000 he worked as a research associate for the Historians‘ Commission of the Republic of Austria. 2000/01 he was a junior fellow at the Internationalen Research Center for Cultural Studies IFK, Vienna, 2004-07 a postdoc fellow in the framework of the Austrian Programme for Advanced Research and Technology (APART) of the Austrian Academy of Sciences ÖAW, 2007-09 a visiting fellow at Institute for Human Sciences IWM, Vienna. Since 2007 he has been a lecturer, since 2009 senior lecturer at the Department of Contemporary History at the University of Vienna. 2008 he was elected member of the Junge Kurie of the Austrian Academy of Sciences ÖAW. Since 2009, he has been conducting research and teaching at the Institute of Contemporary History at the University of Innsbruck, where he served as director from 2010 to 2018. From 2016 to 2019, he was also a member of the University of Innsbruck’s Senate. From March 2018 until the end of 2025, he served as Dean of the Faculty of History, and since November 2025 he has been Vice-Rector for Human Resources at the University of Innsbruck.

Rupnow has held visiting positions at various research institutions: at the Jewish Studies Programme at Dartmouth College, the History Department at Duke University, and on several occasions at the Simon Dubnow Institute for Jewish History and Culture at the University of Leipzig and the Centre for Advanced Holocaust Studies at the United States Holocaust Memorial Museum in Washington, D.C. In 2016/17, he was the Distinguished Visiting Austrian Chair Professor at the Europe Center and Department of History at Stanford University, and in 2022, a Visiting Professor at the European Forum of the Hebrew University of Jerusalem. In 2015, he was the (founding) director of the Research Centre for Migration and Globalisation, and in 2016 the (founding) spokesperson for the doctoral programme ‘Dynamics of Inequality and Difference in the Age of Globalisation’. Since 2014, he has been a member of the scientific advisory board for the ‘Culture of Remembrance’ funding priority of the Province of Tyrol; since 2016, a member and spokesperson of the scientific advisory board of the Documentation Archive Migration Tyrol (DAM); since 2018, a member of the International Scientific Advisory Board of the Vienna Wiesenthal Institute for Holocaust Studies (and its spokesperson since 2021)[4] and, since 2024, a member of the Scientific Advisory Board of the Vienna Psychoanalytic Association. Furthermore, he is involved with ARAtirol, the contact, service and monitoring centre for work critical of racism and discrimination in Tyrol. He served as a consultant at the House of Austrian History in Vienna.

== Awards ==
For his work Rupnow received numerous international awards, e.g. 2009 the Fraenkel Prize in Contemporary History of the Wiener Library, London, and 2011 the „Humanities International“ award of the German Publishers and Booksellers Association.

== Professional memberships ==
Junge Kurie, Austrian Academy of Sciences ÖAW (elected 2008), American Historical Association AHA (since 2003), German Studies Association GSA (since 2003), Austrian Scientists and Scholars in North America ASCINA (since 2004), Society for History of Science GWG (elected 2007). Since 2017, he is also member of the International Academic Advisory Board of the Vienna Wiesenthal Institute for Holocaust Studies VWI.

== Selected publications ==
- (ed., along with Marcus Gräser) Österreichische Zeitgeschichte. Zeitgeschichte in Österreich. Eine Standortbestimmung in Zeiten des Umbruchs (Böhlaus Zeitgeschichtliche Bibliothek 41). Wien 2021, ISBN 978-3-205-20928-7.
- Judenforschung im Dritten Reich: Wissenschaft zwischen Politik, Propaganda und Ideologie (Historische Grundlagen der Moderne, Autoritäre Regime und Diktaturen 4). Nomos, Baden-Baden 2011, ISBN 978-3-8329-6421-4.
- Zeitgeschichte ausstellen in Österreich. Museen – Gedenkstätten – Ausstellungen, Böhlau, Wien u.a. 2011, ISBN 978-3-205-78531-6 (hrsg. mit H. Uhl).
- Pseudowissenschaft. Konzeptionen von Nichtwissenschaftlichkeit in der Wissenschaftsgeschichte (Suhrkamp Taschenbuch Wissenschaft 1897). Suhrkamp, Frankfurt a.M. 2008, ISBN 978-3-518-29497-0 (hrsg. mit V. Lipphardt/J. Thiel/Ch. Wessely).
- Aporien des Gedenkens. Reflexionen über ‚Holocaust’ und Erinnerung (Edition Parabasen Bd. 5). Rombach Wissenschaften, Freiburg/Br.–Berlin 2006, ISBN 978-3-7930-9466-1.
- Vernichten und Erinnern. Spuren nationalsozialistischer Gedächtnispolitik. Wallstein-Verlag, Göttingen 2005, ISBN 3-89244-871-X.
- Die „Zentralstelle für jüdische Auswanderung“ als Beraubungsinstitution. Veröffentlichungen der Österreichischen Historikerkommission. Vermögensentzug während der NS-Zeit sowie Rückstellungen und Entschädigungen seit 1945 in Österreich (Nationalsozialistische Institutionen des Vermögensentzuges, Bd. 20. 1. T.). Oldenbourg, München u.a. 2004, ISBN 3-486-56784-5 (mit G. Anderl).
- Täter-Gedächtnis-Opfer. Das „Jüdische Zentralmuseum“ in Prag 1942–1945. Picus Verlag, Wien 2000, ISBN 978-3-85452-444-1.
