= Carl Schütz =

Austrian engraver

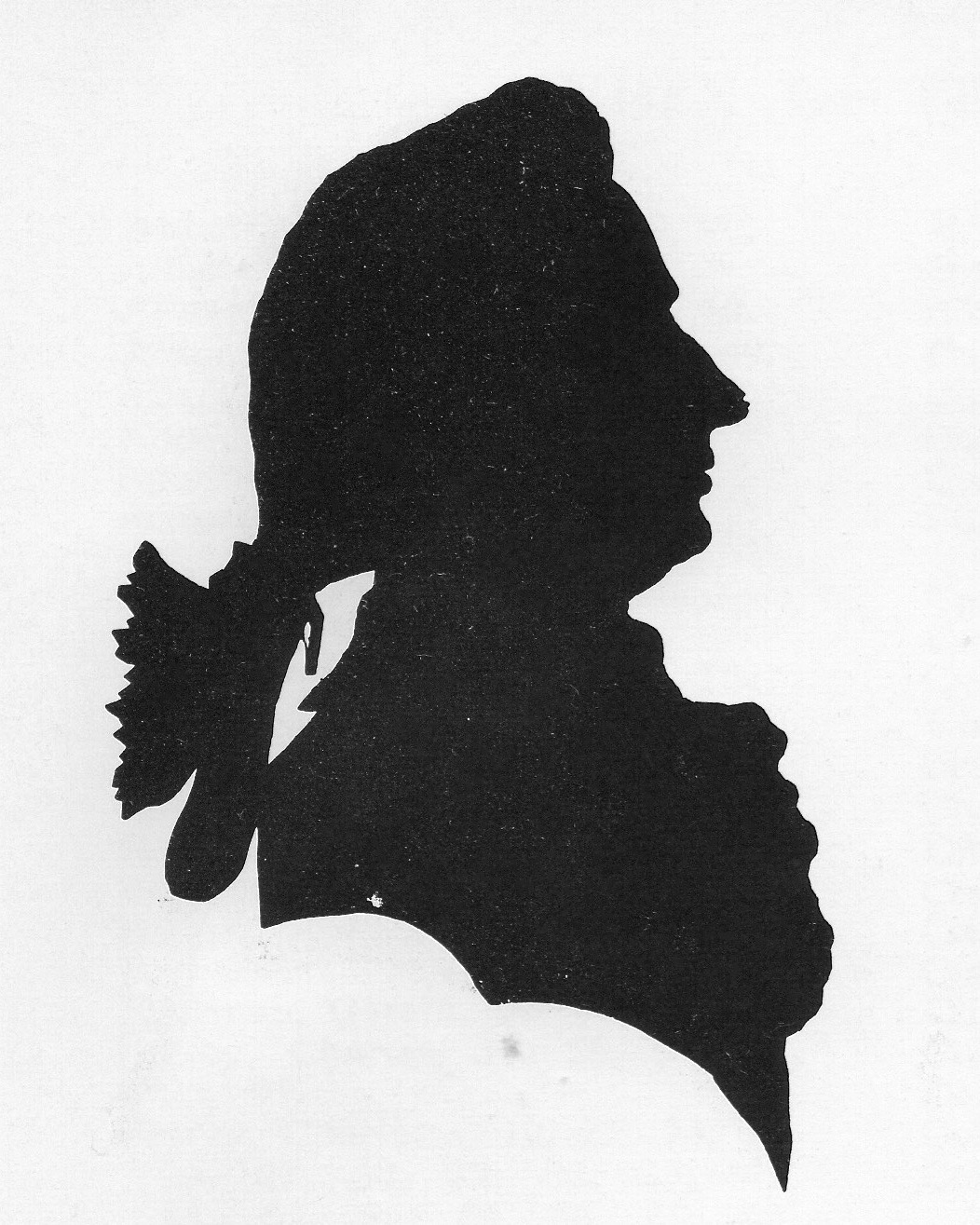
Silhouette by Bernhard Albrecht Moll, 1783.

Carl Schütz (2 November 1745 in Laibach – 14 March 1800 in Vienna) was an Austrian engraver and architect.

Schütz studied at the Academy of Fine Arts Vienna. Later he lectured at the Imperial and Royal Technical Military Academy

His series Collection de 50 vues de la ville de Vienne is of notable importance.

== Bibliography ==
- Österreich auf alten Karten und Ansichten. Graz: Akad. Dr.- u. Verl.-Anst. 1989, S. 326
- Heinz Schöny: Wiener Künstler-Ahnen. Genealogische Daten und Ahnenlisten. Wiener Maler. Band 1: Mittelalter bis Romantik. Vienna: Selbstverlag der Heraldisch-Genealogischen Gesellschaft "Adler" 1970, S. 124
- Das Wiener Heimatbuch – Mariahilf. Hg. von der Arbeitsgemeinschaft des Mariahilfer Heimatmuseums. Vienna: Austria Press 1963, S. 229
- Renate Wagner-Rieger: Das Wiener Bürgerhaus des Barock und Klassizismus. Vienna: Hollinek 1957 (Österreichische Heimat, 20), S. 265
- Ulrich Thieme / Felix Becker [ed.]: Allgemeines Lexikon der bildenden Künstler von der Antike bis zur Gegenwart. 37 Bände. Leipzig: Engelmann 1907-1950
- Hans Rotter: Die Josefstadt. Geschichte des 8. Wiener Gemeindebezirkes. Vienna: Selbstverlag 1918, S. 208
- Ignaz Schwarz: Wiener Straßenbilder im Zeitalter des Rokoko. Die Wiener Ansichten von Schütz, Ziegler, Janscha 1779-1798. Vienna: Gilhofer & Ranschburg 1914
- Cyriak Bodenstein: Hundert Jahre Kunstgeschichte Wiens 1788-1888. Eine Festgabe anläßlich der Säcular-Feier der Pensions-Gesellschaft bildender Künstler Wiens. Vienna: Gerold 1888
