= Heinz Politzer =

American poet

- Born: 31 December 1910; Vienna, Austria-Hungary
- Died: 30 July 1978 (aged 67); Berkeley, California, U.S.
- Occupation: Professor of German
- Known for: Kafka scholarship

Heinz Politzer (31 December 1910 – 30 July 1978) was an academic and writer. As a young man he was forced to flee Nazism first to Palestine and then to the United States, where he taught German language and literature as a professor at the Bryn Mawr College, Oberlin College, and the University of California, Berkeley. He was a literary scholar, published poet, and prominent editor, particularly of Franz Kafka. As a close associate of Kafka's protégé, Max Brod, Politzer coedited with Brod the first complete collection of Kafka's works in eight volumes, published initially by the Schocken publishing house of Berlin during the early years of the Nazi dictatorship and subsequently by the successor firm Schocken Books in New York.

== Life ==
Politzer was born in Vienna to Marie (née Löwenthal) and Moritz Sigmund Politzer, a courtroom lawyer. After completing secondary schooling at a humanities-focused Gymnasium in 1929, he enrolled at the University of Vienna and studied German and English literatures. He transferred in 1931 to the Charles University in Prague, where he began dissertation research on Kafka. In 1933–35, he collaborated with Max Brod, comparing the already published versions of Kafka's books with the original manuscripts in order to prepare volumes 1-4 of Kafka's collected works for publication. He also worked on parts of volume 5 prior to emigrating.

Fleeing fascism, Politzer moved to Palestine in 1938. There he befriended Martin Buber and enrolled from 1938 to 1940 at the Hebrew University. He was involved with the American Guild for German Cultural Freedom in 1938–39, prior to relocating to the U.S. in 1947, where he matriculated at Bryn Mawr College. He taught there as an instructor, completed a Ph.D. in 1950 with a dissertation on Kafka (work for which had begun in Prague), and advanced to an assistant professorship. He was naturalized as a U.S. citizen in 1952 and in the same year converted from Judaism to Episcopalianism. In 1976, he converted to Roman Catholicism.

Politzer taught and conducted research as an associate professor at Oberlin College starting in 1952, and then in 1960 received an appointment as a full professor at the University of California, Berkeley, where he held tenure until his retirement in 1978. His scholarly focus was on the writings and influence of Franz Kafka, German and Austrian literature, Fin-de-Siecle Vienna, and the psychoanalytical approach to literary interpretation. During the last decade of his life, he became immersed in the works of Sigmund Freud, resulting in his volume Freud and Tragedy, which appeared posthumously (German edition 2003, English version 2006). He was a highly respected teacher, especially beloved by the graduate students who took part in his advanced seminars.

With his first wife, Ilse née Schröter, he had one daughter, Maria. He was survived by his second wife, Jane née Horner, with whom he had four sons, Michael, David, Stephen, and Eric, as well as his sister Kate. In recognition of his many contributions to the study of Austrian literature and culture, his ashes are interred at the historic Petersfriedhof in Salzburg, Austria.

== Awards and honors ==
Among many prizes and honours, he was three times a recipient of a Guggenheim Fellowship (1958, 1966, 1974). In 1963, the Commonwealth Club of California awarded him its silver medal. In his homeland, he received the Austrian Cross (1966), the Grillparzer Ring (1972), and the Vienna Humanities Prize (1974) as well as an invitation to deliver the inaugural address at the 1976 Salzburg Music Festival. He also was awarded the key to the City of Vienna. Germany conferred upon him an Officer's Cross, and on his 65th birthday his colleagues presented him with a Festschrift.

== Works ==
- Ed. Vor dem Gesetz, by Franz Kafka. Berlin: Schocken, 1934.
- Ed., with Max Brod. Gesammelte Schriften, by Franz Kafka. 6 vols. Berlin: Schocken, 1935–37.
    - Vol. 1: Erzählungen und kleine Prosa. 1935.
    - Vol. 2: Amerika. Roman. 1935.
    - Vol. 3: Der Prozess. Roman. 2nd ed. 1935.
    - Vol. 4: Das Schloss. Roman. 2nd ed. 1935.
    - Vol. 5: Beschreibung eines Kampfes. Novellen, Skizzen, Aphorismen aus dem Nachlass. 1936.
    - Vol. 6: Tagebücher 1910-1923. 1937.
  - Ed., with Max Brod. Gesammelte Schriften, by Franz Kafka. 2 vols. New York: Schocken, 1946–53.
    - Vol. 7: Briefe an Milena. 1946.
    - Vol. 8: Hochzeitsvorbereitungen auf dem Lande und andere Prosa aus dem Nachlass. 1953.
- Ed. Die Goldene Gasse. Jüdische Sagen und Legenden. Auswahl aus den Sippurim. Vienna and Jerusalem: R. Löwit, 1937. 272 pp.
- Fenster vor dem Firmament. Gedichte. Leipzig: J. Kittl, 1937. 69 pp. Leipzig: J. Kittls Nachfolger, 1970.
- Gedichte. Jerusalem: Peter Freund, 1941. 48 pp. Jerusalem: Peter Freund, 1974.
- Le-zek̲er Lûdvîg Yônas (Ansprache zum Gedächtnis des Malers Ludwig Jonas, 1887–1942). Jerusalem: Peter Freund, 1943. 7 pp.
- "Studies on Jewish Contributors to German Literature: Heine and Börne". Ph.D. diss., Bryn Mawr, 1950. 149 pp.
- Ed. Das Kafka-Buch. Eine innere Biographie in Selbstzeugnissen. Fischer-Bücherei 708. Frankfurt am Main: Fischer, 1951. 271 pp. Reprints 1965, 1966, 1968, 1969, 1970, 1971, 1973, 1974, 1975, 1976, 1977, 1978, 1983, 1989, 1990.
  - Kafuka to sono shūhen. Transl. Michifuyu Kitao. Tokyo: Shinbisha, 1974. 140 pp.
- With John William Kurtz. German One: Ein deutsches Lern- und Lesebuch. Oberlin: Oberlin College, 1956. ix + 275 + 16 pp.
  - With John William Kurtz. German: A Comprehensive Course for College Students. New York: W. W. Norton, 1959. xx + 377 pp. Rev. ed., 1966. xxv + 415 pp.
- Martin Buber: Humanist and Teacher. Faculty Lectures, The Humanistic Tradition, Oberlin College. New York: National Council, 1957. 24 pp.
- Ed. Amerika erzählt. Siebzehn Short Stories. Fischer Bücherei 209. Frankfurt: Fischer, 1958. 244 pp.
  - Ed. Amerika erzählt. Erzählungen amerikanischer Schriftsteller. Fischer Bücherei 209. Frankfurt am Main: Fischer, 1971. 223 pp.
- Die gläserne Kathedrale. Gedichte. Vienna: Bergland, 1959. 90 pp.
- Ed. Des wüsten Lebens flücht'ger Reiz. Theaterlieder, by Johann Nestroy. Insel-Bücherei 724. Frankfurt am Main: Insel, 1961. 71 pp.
- Franz Kafka: Parable and Paradox. Ithaca: Cornell University Press, 1962. xxi + 376 pp. 2nd rev. ed., 1965. xxvii + 398 pp.
  - Franz Kafka, der Künstler. Frankfurt am Main: S. Fischer, 1965. 563 pp. Suhrkamp Taschenbuch 433. Frankfurt am Main: Suhrkamp, 1978. 579 pp. 3rd ed., 1986.
- Ed. Grillparzer über sich selbst. Aus den Tagebüchern. Insel-Bücherei 842. Frankfurt am Main: Insel, 1965. 145 pp.
- Franz Grillparzers „Der arme Spielmann“. Dichtung und Erkenntnis 2. Stuttgart: J. B. Metzler, 1967. 64 pp.
- Transl. Der alte Seefahrer, by Samuel Taylor Coleridge. Insel-Bücherei 901. Leipzig: Insel, 1968. 71 pp.
- Das Schweigen der Sirenen. Studien zur deutschen und österreichischen Literatur. Stuttgart: J. B. Metzler, 1968. 436 pp.
  - Also as Milczenie syren. Studia z literatury niemieckiej i austriackiej. Transl. Jerzy Hummel. Warsaw: Państwowy Instytut Wydawniczy, 1973. 280 pp.
- "Sigmund Freud as Interpreter of His Dreams". Pacifica Tape Library, 1970.
- Ed. Morgen fahr' ich heim. Böhmische Erzählungen, by Johannes Urzidil. Munich: A. Langen - G. Müller, 1971. 503 pp.
- Heinz Politzer Bibliographie. Biberach a.d. Riss: Thomae, 1971. 12 pp.
- Franz Grillparzer, oder Das abgründige Biedermeier. Vienna: F. Molden, 1972. 416 pp. Vienna: Paul Szolnay, 1990. xiv, 416 pp.
- Ed. Franz Kafka. Wege der Forschung 322. Darmstadt: Wissenschaftliche Buchgesellschaft, 1973. x, 560 pp.
- Hatte Ödipus einen Ödipus-Komplex? Versuche zum Thema Psychoanalyse und Literatur. Munich: Piper, 1974. 236 pp.
- Musikerlöste Dämonie. Rede zur Eröffnung der Salzburger Festspiele 1976. [Salzburg: n.p., 1976.] 36 pp.
- Ed., with Joachim Schondorff. Zeit und Ewigkeit. Tausend Jahre österreichischer Lyrik. Düsseldorf: Claassen, 1978. 600 pp. Düsseldorf: Claassen, 1980. 611 pp.
- Freud und das Tragische. Ed. William H. Hemecker. Wiener Neustadt: Edition Gutenberg, 2003. 251 pp.
  - Freud and Tragedy. Ed. William H. Hemecker. Transl. Michael Mitchell. Riverside: Ariadne, 2006. 176 pp.
