= Brigitte Bailer-Galanda =

Austrian historian

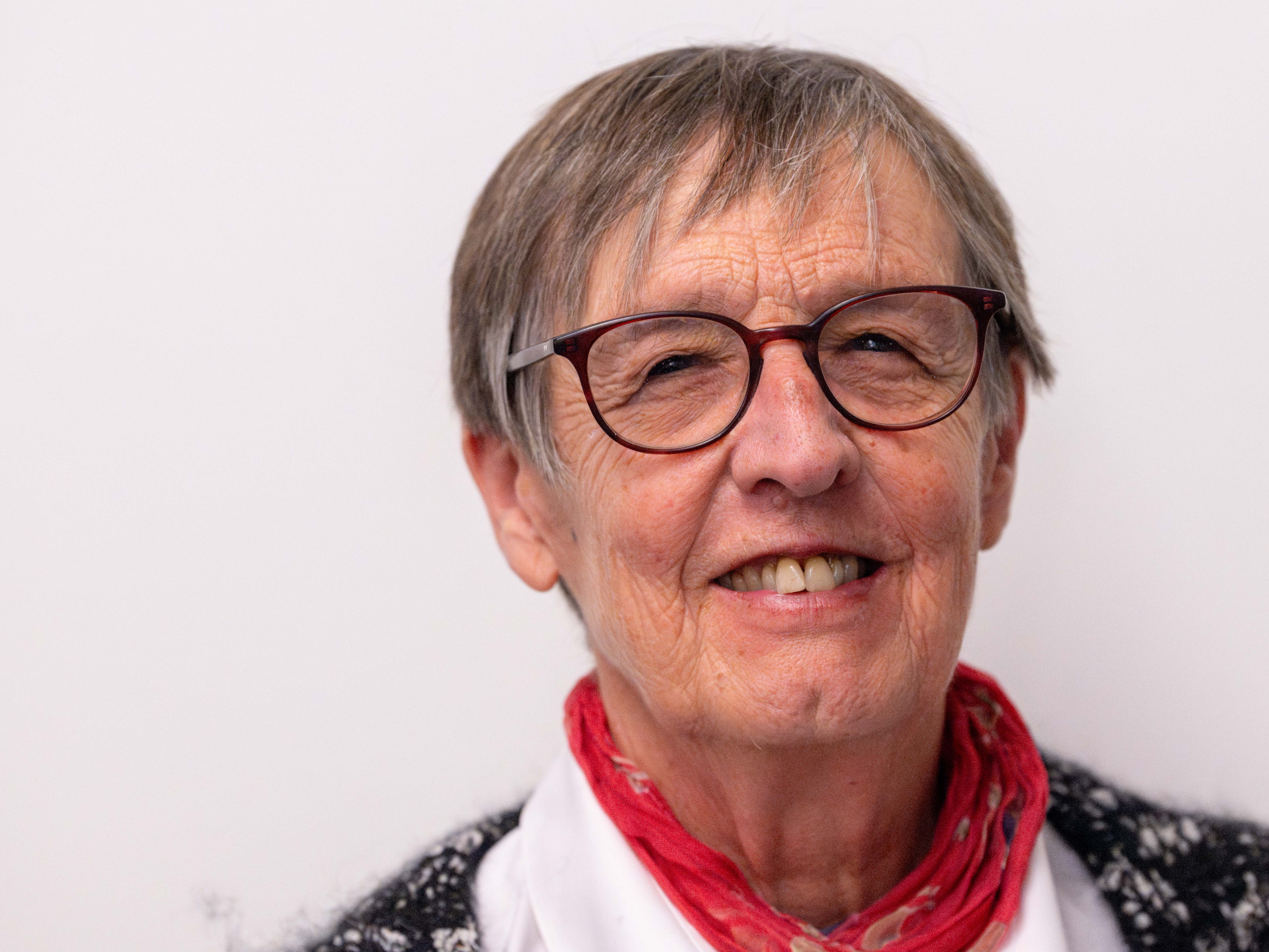
- Bailer-Galanda in 2026
- Born: March 5, 1952 (age 74); Vienna
- Occupations: Social scientist, historian

Brigitte Bailer-Galanda (born 5 March 1952, Vienna) is an Austrian social scientist and historian. She was the director of the Documentation Centre of Austrian Resistance and deputy chairwoman of the Historical Commission of the Republic of Austria. Bailer-Galanda is an honorary professor of contemporary history at the University of Vienna.

Bailer-Galanda's research focuses on German resistance to Nazism, the Holocaust and its denial, and right-wing extremism in Austria.

== Early life ==
Brigitte Bailer-Galanda was born on 5 March 1952 in Vienna, Austria.

== Education ==
Bailer-Galanda enrolled in the Vereinsgasse Federal High School in 1970 and studied sociology and economics. She graduated four years later. From 1990 to 1992, she underwent doctoral studies under Erika Weinzierl's direction at the University of Vienna.

== Career ==
Bailer-Galanda became an assistant researcher at the Documentation Centre of Austrian Resistance in 1979. In 1994, she was made a lecturer at the Department of Political Science at the University of Vienna. There she completed a habilitation in 2003 with the thesis The Origin of Restitution Laws (Die Entstehung der Rückstellungsgesetze), for which she was named an honorary professor of contemporary history. The next year, Bailer-Galanda succeeded Wolfgang Neugebauer as director of the Documentation Centre of Austrian Resistance in 2004 and was herself succeeded in 2014 by Gerhard Baumgartner.

== Awards ==
- 1992: Käthe Leichter Prize for the study of women's history in Austria
- 1996: Willy and Helga Sell-Verlon Award for antifascist journalism in Austria
- 1999: Bruno Kreisky Prize for political works from the Dr. Karl Renner Institute
- 2013: Decoration of Honour for Services to the Republic of Austria (speech by Friedrich Faulhammer)
- 2015: Marietta and Friedrich Torberg Medal from the Israelitische Kultusgemeinde Wien
