= Vienna Wiesenthal Institute for Holocaust Studies =

Austrian research centre on antisemitism and racism

Vienna Wiesenthal Institute for Holocaust Studies (VWI)
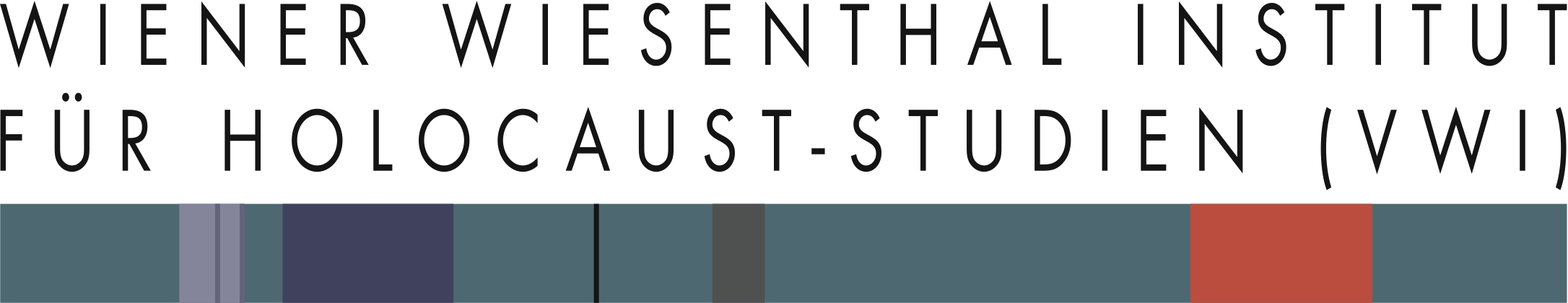
- Founded: 2009
- Founder: Simon Wiesenthal, Ingo Zechner, Avshalom Hodik, Anton Pelinka, Brigitte Bailer-Galanda und Bertrand Perz
- Type: Research Institute
- Purpose: Holocaust studies
- Location: Vienna, Austria
- Method: Research
- Leader: Jochen Böhler (since October 2022), Béla Rásky (until September 2020)
- Key people: Simon Wiesenthal, Jochen Böhler, Angelika Brechelmacher, Sandro Fasching, Kinga Frojimovics, Barbara Grzelak, Sabine Hogl, Manfred Huber, Mirjam Karoly, Éva Kovács, Béla Rásky, Philipp Rohrbach, Wolfgang Schellenbacher, Jana Starek, Sandra B. Weiss, Mirjam Wilhelm, Marianne Windsperger
- Employees: 9 staff members, 12 fellows
- Website: vwi.ac.at

The Vienna Wiesenthal Institute for Holocaust Studies (VWI) is a research centre dedicated to the research and documentation of and education on all aspects of antisemitism, racism and the Holocaust, including its emergence and aftermath. It was designed by Simon Wiesenthal as well as international and Austrian researchers. The institute is located in Vienna, Austria. It is financed by the City of Vienna and the Austrian Federal Ministry of Education, Science and Research.

== History ==
The Jewish Community Vienna (Israelitische Kultusgemeinde Wien, IKG) and several other renowned institutions initiated the idea to establish an international Shoah research institute in Vienna in 2002. Simon Wiesenthal was still personally involved in designing the concept for the institute before his death in 2005.

In December 2002, the City of Vienna confirmed that it would financially support the project with a sum to match that to be provided by the Republic of Austria. In March 2008, support by the Republic of Austria for the VWI was also finally confirmed in a speech in the council of ministers. There followed the establishment of the office, taking up work in the spring of 2009.

The preliminary phase in 2010 and 2011 is to see the groundwork being laid for a specialized scholarly library and an institute-affiliated archive (based on the Holocaust-relevant documents of the IKG archive) as well as the design and trial of various forms of public events – such as lectures, book presentations, conferences and workshops as well as public media interventions in remembrance of the Shoah. This was followed by the preparation of a scholarly research program as well as a long-term development plan for the institute.

In December 2016, VWI moved to its new premises in the city centre of Vienna on Rabensteig 3.

== Organisation ==
=== Supporting body ===
The supporting body of the VWI is an association that had been formed in the founding phase of the VWI by the Jewish Community Vienna, the Jewish Documentation Center (Dokumentationszentrum des Bundes Jüdischer Verfolgter des Naziregimes), the Documentation Centre of Austrian Resistance (Dokumentationsarchiv des österreichischen Widerstandes DÖW), the Institute of Contemporary History at the University of Vienna (Institut für Zeitgeschichte der Universität Wien), the Institute of Conflict Research (Institut für Konfliktforschung), the Jewish Museum Vienna and the International Research Centre for Cultural Studies (Internationales Forschungszentrum Kulturwissenschaften, IFK). Following a dispute on the permission for use of the archive of the Jewish Community Vienna, the Institute of Conflict Research and the IFK left the supporting body in November 2009, their representatives also resigning from their posts in the VWI board of directors.

After the settlement of this dispute, a lending agreement on the use of the Holocaust-relevant materials in the IKG archive – as envisaged by the original board of directors – was signed by the new board of directors in November 2009. Subsequently, the International Holocaust Remembrance Alliance and the Centre for Jewish Cultural History at the University of Salzburg (Zentrum für jüdische Kulturgeschichte, Universität Salzburg) joined the supporting body of the VWI in the beginning of 2010. The development of the institute and preparation for full operation was continued on the basis of the step-by-step plan as agreed on in the founding phase. With the arrival of the first fellows in autumn 2012 the institute started its all-out operation.

=== Board of directors ===
The board of directors of the VWI is appointed by the members of the supporting body. This holds the highest decision-making power in all organisational aspects of the VWI.

Anton Pelinka was the first chairman of the board, the historian and philosopher Ingo Zechner VWI's first managing director. In November 2009, after a dispute on the proper usage of the archives of the IKG (intended to become a part of the holdings of the VWI), several members of the board and the managing director resigned. Under the new chairman of the board, the professor of law at the University of Salzburg, Georg Graf, is deputies being Brigitte Bailer-Galanda and Ariel Muzicant this conflict – well documented in the Austrian media – finally was settled, and a contract on the usage of the archives already worked out by the former board in accordance with the IKG was signed.

In January 2010, the Viennese contemporary historian Béla Rásky became VWI's new managing director. As of October 2012, sociologist Éva Kovács from the Centre of Social Studies at the Hungarian Academy of Sciences became the institute's Research Programme Director.

In December 2018, Georg Graf resigned and was followed by Terezija Stoisits as new chairwoman of the board.

=== International Academic Board ===
The International Academic Board is a key actor in all academic issues. The board consists of at least nine, maximum twelve internationally renowned experts, of whom no more than three are allowed to be from within Austrian academic institutions. Particular care is taken that the board remains interdisciplinary. Members and employees of members of the supporting body of the VWI cannot join the International Academic Board. The International Academic Board is elected for a period of three years at the general assembly, like the board.

As of January 2020, the members of the board are as follows (in alphabetical order):

- Nanci Adler (NIOD, Amsterdam)
- Jolanta Ambrosewicz-Jacobs (Uniwersytet Jagielloński, Kraków)
- Peter Black (United States Holocaust Memorial Museum)
- Susanne Heim (Institute of Contemporary History, Munich-Berlin)
- Robert Graham Knight (Loughborough University, Leicestershire)
- Dan Michman (International Institute for Holocaust Research, Yad Vashem, Jerusalem; Bar-Ilan University, Ramat Gan)
- Anthony Dirk Moses (European University Institute, Florence)
- Dirk Rupnow (University of Innsbruck)
- Irina Sherbakova (Memorial, Moscow)
- Sybille Steinbacher (Fritz Bauer Institut, Frankfurt)
- Dominique Trimbur (Fondation pour la Mémoire de la Shoah)
- Yfaat Weiss (Simon-Dubnow-Institut, Leipzig)

== Activities ==
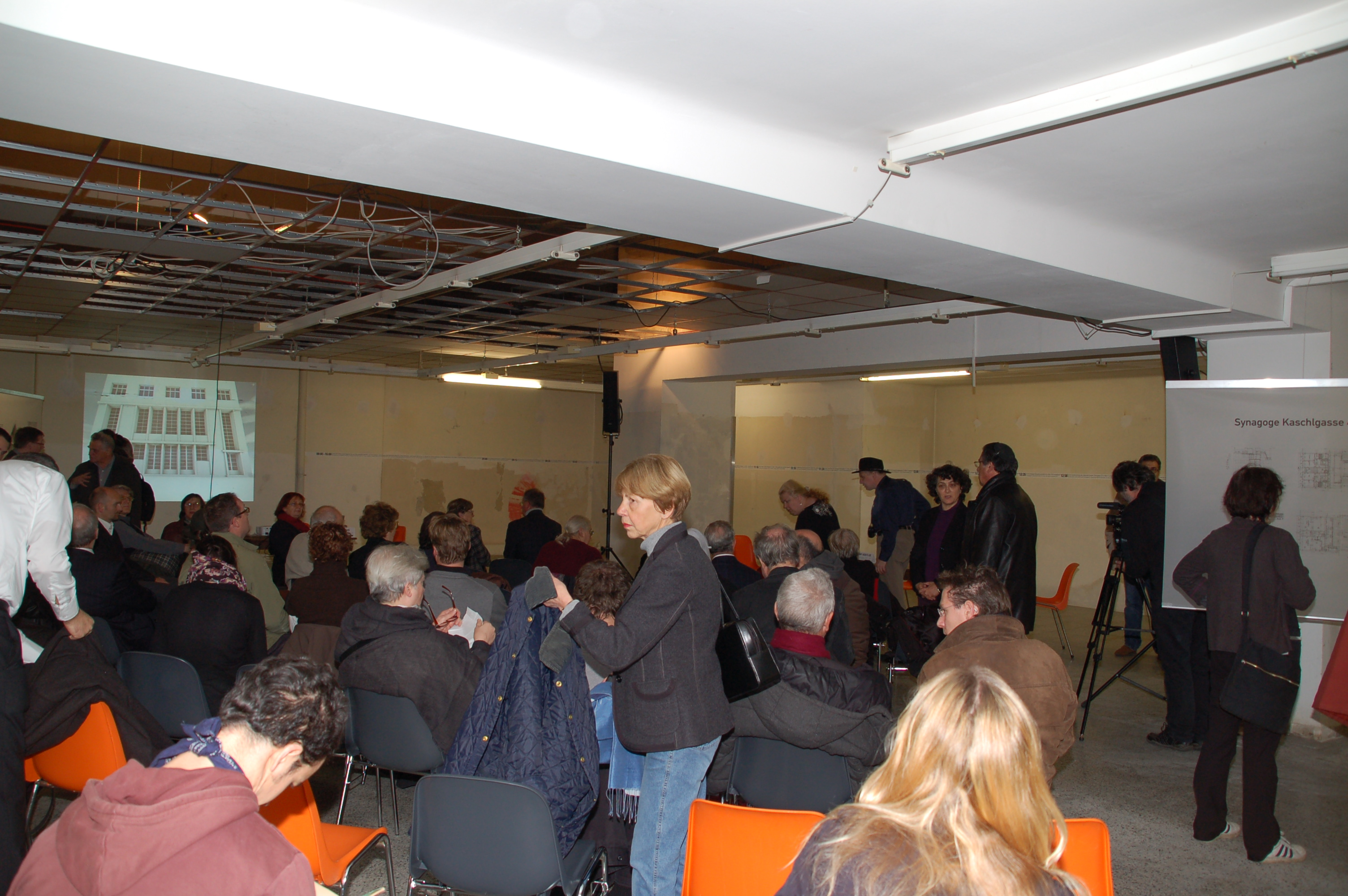
"Vestiges in a forgotten place": former Synagogue Vienna 20, Kaschlgasse – November 9, 2010

S:I.M.O.N. Shoah: Intervention. Methods. Documentation
- Discipline: Holocaust studies
- Language: English
- Edited by: Éva Kovács

Publication details
- History: 2014
- Publisher: Vienna Wiesenthal Institute for Holocaust Studies
- Frequency: Quarterly
- Open access: Yes
- License: CC-BY-SA-NC-ND

Standard abbreviations
- ISO 4: S:I.M.O.N. Shoah: Interv. Methods Doc.

Indexing
- ISSN: 2408-9192

Links
- Journal homepage

The activities of the VWI fall into the three categories research, documentation and education. Within these categories, the institute addresses all issues related to antisemitism, racism and the Holocaust, including its emergence and aftermath.

Research is to be international and interdisciplinary at the VWI. It takes one of two forms: on the one hand, there is an annually announced fellowship program for Senior, Research and senior fellows, while on the other hand research projects of varying length will be conducted. Various research projects on the history of antisemitism and the Holocaust have been already worked out by the Research Programme Director, the managing director and the staff members of the institute (with the support of the academic advisory board), are already filed for application.

Since November 2010, VWI is a member in the consortium for the EU project European Holocaust Research Infrastructure – EHRI which entered in its second phase – EHRI-2 – in the end of 2014. Since February 2020, the institute is part of the EU-financed preparatory phase to build up a European research infrastructure on the Holocaust within the European Strategy Forum on Research Infrastructures – ESFRI.

The aim of the documentation project of the VWI is to unite thematically relevant but hitherto separated archival materials, ensure their safekeeping and make them accessible to search tools. A first step in this direction has been taken in the form of cooperation in producing the online platform ns-quellen.at which had been commissioned to the "Research Office. Association for Academic and Cultural Services" (Forschungsbüro. Verein für wissenschaftliche und kulturelle Dienstleistungen) and was completed in March 2011. Digitalization of the Holocaust-relevant parts of the IKG archive began in September 2010 with work on the so-called Jerusalem materials of the archive. This work is conducted using the archival software "scopeArchiv", which is in widespread use in Austria. The scholarly library of the VWI is currently numbering approx. 14,000 volumes, concentrating to some extent on books on Holocaust studies that are not accessible in Austria. The institute library is a public reference library. The library catalogue can be searched via the Austrian joint library system (OBV).

Since the autumn of 2012, the institute hosts two senior, two research and four junior fellows a year. In general, the call for proposals is announced at the end of a calendar year. Decision on grants is made by a sub-commission of the academic advisory board and a research staff member of the VWI in the spring of each year.

In the autumn of 2014, the e-Journal of the institute – S:I.M.O.N. - Shoah: Intervention. Methods. DocumentatiON. – went online, publishing the peer-reviewed manuscripts of the Simon Wiesenthal Lectures, the Working Papers of the fellows and articles selected by the Editorial Committee. VWI's bilingual – German and English – book series is edited by the Viennese publishing house new academic press.

The institute's German-speaking, annual newsletter VWI im Fokus informs on all upcoming events and activities.

== Events ==
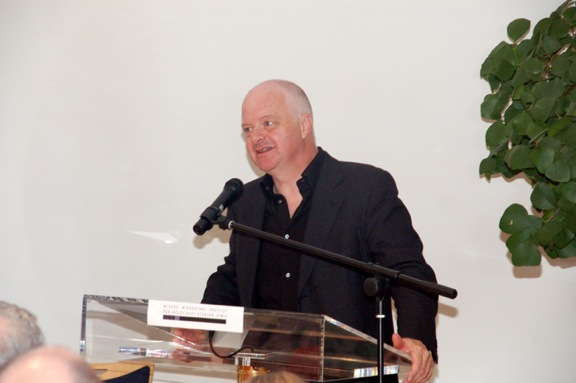
Fifth Simon Wiesenthal Lecture by Robert Jan van Pelt – June 10, 2010

To achieve its aims of education, the VWI organises events such as book presentations, media and/or arts interventions in the public space in remembrance of the Shoah. An exhibition centre and an online platform are planned for when the institute has taken up full operation.

The "Simon Wiesenthal Lectures" which have by now grown into a VWI trademark event, aim to bring current Holocaust research to a wider public with the help of renowned international researchers. They take place approx. every two months in the roof-top foyer of the Austrian State Archives at the Minoritenplatz in Vienna.

At the end of a calendar year, VWI organises its annual "Simon Wiesenthal Conference": In 2011, the conference's topic was "Scores of Commemoration. The Holocaust in Music", while in 2012, "Before the Holocaust had its Name. Early Confrontations of the Mass Murder of the Jews". In 2013, VWI – together with the United States Holocaust Memorial Museum – hosted the Simon Wiesenthal Conference under the title "Collaboration in Eastern Europe during World War II and the Holocaust".
