= Ingo Zechner =

Austrian historian and philosopher

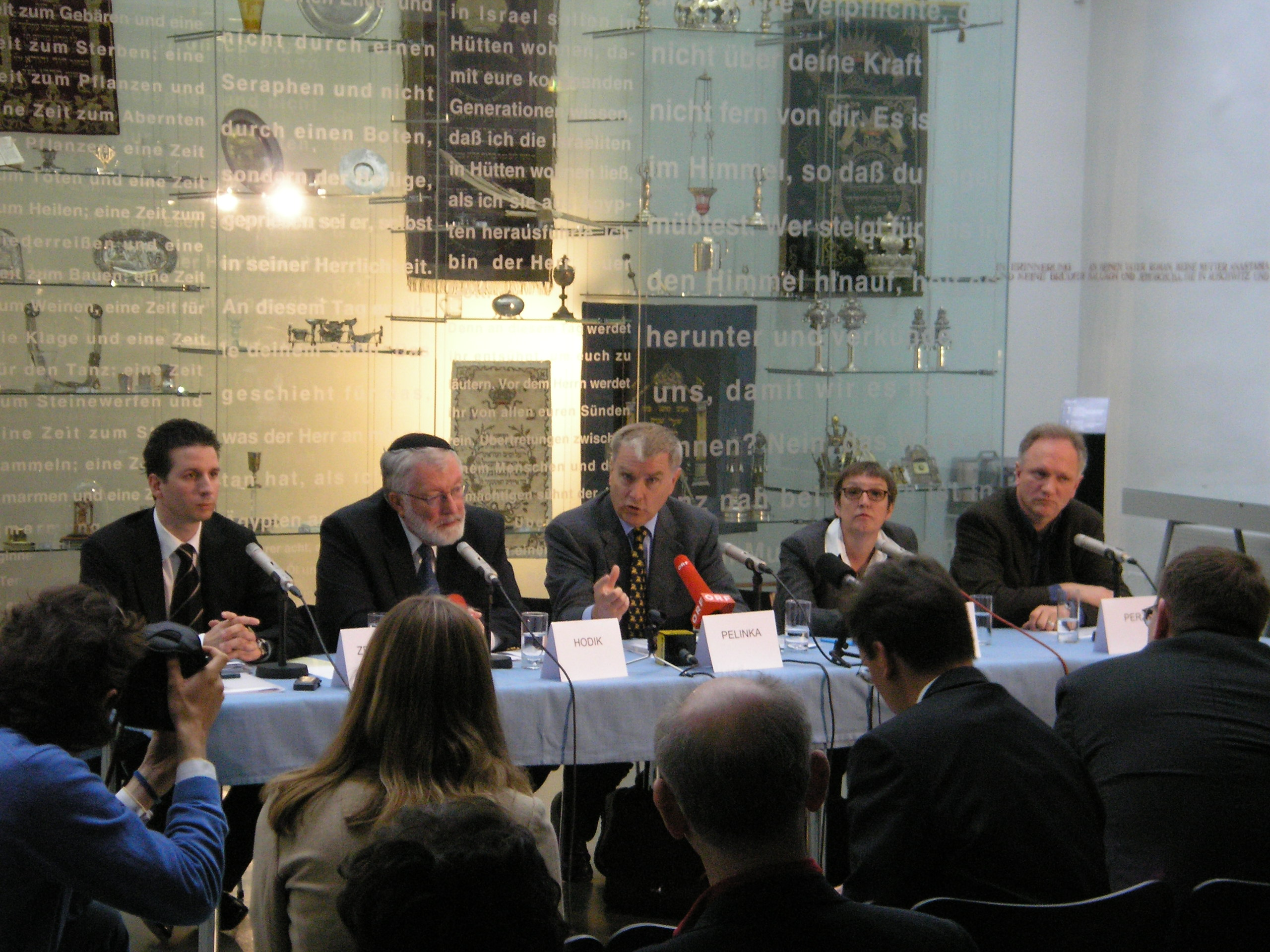
Ingo Zechner (left) at the press conference announcing the Vienna Wiesenthal Institute for Holocaust Studies in June 2006

Ingo Zechner (born 24 December 1972 in Klagenfurt, Austria) is a philosopher and historian. He is the Director of the Ludwig Boltzmann Institute for Digital History (LBIDH) in Vienna.

Research topics: time and memory, aesthetics (especially visual culture), film, digital media and Holocaust Studies. Further research on the concept of modernity in the fields of Cultural Studies and Post-structuralism (Michel Foucault, Gilles Deleuze, Jacques Derrida etc.).

== Life ==
From 1991 until 1997 Zechner studied history and philosophy at the University of Vienna; from 1997 until 2001 he completed a PhD Program in philosophy at the University of Vienna supervised by Hans-Dieter Bahr.

Zechner served as a historian at the Jewish Community Vienna from 2000 until 2008. At the Holocaust Victims’ Information and Support Center of the Jewish Community Vienna, headed by Zechner from 2003 to 2008, he dealt with various kinds of National Socialist Deprivation of Property and Restitution. His fields of activity were the restitution of works of art and the restitution of real estate, research on the property of the Jewish organizations in Austria, the reconstruction of the Archive of the Jewish Community Vienna and the planning of the Vienna Wiesenthal Institute for Holocaust Studies (VWI). He was also a member of the Austrian Commission for Provenance Research from 2002 to 2008 and of the Viennese Restitution Commission from 2003 to 2008. Until November 2009 he was the Business Manager of the Vienna Wiesenthal Institute for Holocaust Studies (VWI).

From 2010 to 2011 Zechner was a researcher at the Association for the History of the Labour Movement (VGA) in Vienna. Since 2011 he has been an academic staff member at the Ludwig Boltzmann Institute for History and Society in Vienna, since 2015 the institute's director. The institute was transformed into the Ludwig Boltzmann Institute for Digital History in 2019. From 2013 to 2016 Zechner was the Associated Director and Research Coordinator of the IFK International Research Center for Cultural Studies in Vienna.

Various teaching activities, from 1997 to 2000 at the Institute for Philosophy of the University of Vienna (together with Hans-Dieter Bahr), since 2003 at the Institute of Contemporary History of the University of Vienna.

2004 he was a BTWH/IFK-Visiting Scholar at the German Department of the University of California, Berkeley, 2013 the Raab Foundation Fellow at the Center for Advanced Holocaust Studies (United States Holocaust Memorial Museum) in Washington, D.C.

He is a participant and project leader at various research projects and holds lectures in Austria, Germany, Switzerland, France, Greece, Sweden, Iceland, Poland, Russia, Israel, Canada and the United States.

== Publications (selection) ==
Monographs

- Bild und Ereignis. Fragmente einer Aesthetik. Vienna: Turia+Kant 1999. 249 pages. (ISBN 3-85132-228-2)
- Deleuze. Der Gesang des Werdens. Munich: Wilhelm Fink Verlag 2003. 222 pages. (ISBN 3-7705-3915-X)

Anthologies

- Die helle und die dunkle Seite der Moderne. Festschrift für Siegfried Mattl zum 60. Geburtstag. Vienna: Turia+Kant 2014. 376 pages (together with Werner Michael Schwarz). (ISBN 978-3-85132-751-9)
- Abenteuer Alltag. Zur Archäologie des Amateurfilms. Vienna: Synema 2015. 270 pages (together with Siegfried Mattl, Carina Lesky and Vrääth Öhner). (ISBN 978-3-901644-63-4)

Journals

- Mapping. Zeitschrift für Kulturwissenschaften, vol. 1/2018, Bielefeld: transcript. 116 pages (together with Brigitta Schmidt-Lauber). (ISBN 978-3-8376-4244-5)

Sourcebooks

- Das Rote Wien. Schlüsseltexte der Zweiten Wiener Moderne 1919–1934. Berlin - Boston: De Gruyter Oldenbourg 2020. 976 pages (together with Rob McFarland and Georg Spitaler). ISBN 978-3-11-064003-8 (Hardcover); ISBN 978-3-11-064162-2 (PDF); ISBN 978-3-11-064208-7 (EPUB)
- The Red Vienna Sourcebook. Rochester NY: Camden House 2020. 804 pages (together with Rob McFarland and Georg Spitaler). ISBN 978-1-57113-355-7 (Hardcover); ISBN 978-1-64014-067-7 (Paperback); ISBN 978-1-78744-610-6 (PDF)

Exhibition catalogs

- Ordnung muss sein. Das Archiv der Israelitischen Kultusgemeinde Wien. Vienna: Jewish Museum Vienna 2007 (together with Felicitas Heimann-Jelinek and Lothar Hoelbling). 198 pages. (ISBN 978-3-901398-45-2)

Articles

- 'Das Pandora-Phantasma. Von Epimetheus bis Jack the Ripper: Der Stoff, aus dem Wedekinds Lulu gemacht ist'. In: Zeitgeschichte. Vol. 28, 1–2. Innsbruck: Studien Verlag 2001. p. 34-43. (ISBN 3706515679)
- 'Die Melancholie der Moderne. Adorno, Wien und der Jazz'. In: Wolfgang Maderthaner, Lutz Musner, Siegfried Mattl, Roman Horak, Otto Penz (eds.): Randzone. Jugend und Massenkultur in Wien 1950–1970. Vienna: Turia+Kant 2004. p. 241-259. (ISBN 3-85132-379-3)
- 'Die Bibliothek der Israelitischen Kultusgemeinde Wien. Entstehung – Entziehung – Restitution und so genannte "herrenlose" Buecher'. In: Murray G. Hall, Christina Koestner, Margot Werner (eds.): Die Oesterreichische Nationalbibliothek stellt sich ihrer NS-Vergangenheit. Vienna 2004, p. 82-103.
- 'Landschaften des Todes und der Erinnerung'. In: Oya Erdogan, Dietmar Koch (eds.): Im Garten der Philosophie. Festschrift fuer Hans-Dieter Bahr zum 65. Geburtstag. Munich: Wilhelm Fink Verlag 2005. p. 279-283. (ISBN 3770541421)
- 'Zweifelhaftes Eigentum. Fussnoten zur Kunstrestitution in Oesterreich'. In: Gabriele Anderl, Alexandra Caruso (eds.), NS-Kunstraub in Oesterreich und seine Folgen. Innsbruck: Studien Verlag 2005. p. 235-246. (ISBN 3-70651956-9)
- 'Wie Entscheidungen fallen – Kunstrestitution in der Praxis'. In: Verena Pawlowsky, Harald Wendelin (eds.), Enteignete Kunst. Raub und Rueckgabe – Oesterreich von 1938 bis heute. Vienna: Mandelbaum Verlag 2006. p. 209-220 (ISBN 3-85476-185-6)
- '"White Negro" und "Negro White": Mailer, Fassbinder, Sirk, Vian'. In: Blackness, transnational, ed. by Sabine Mueller (Österreichische Zeitschrift für Geschichtswissenschaften. 17. Jahrgang, 4/2006). Innsbruck: Studien Verlag 2006. p. 51-67. (ISBN 978-3-7065-4264-7)
- 'Die Sprachlosigkeit des anderen – Mobilitaet und Uebersetzung in Hans-Christian Schmids Film "Lichter"'. In: Klaus Mueller-Richter, Ramona Uritescu-Lombard (eds.), Imaginaere Topografien. Migration und Verortung. Bielefeld: transcript Verlag 2007, p. 161-176. (ISBN 978-3-89942-594-9)
- 'Von der Macht und Ohnmacht des Archivs'. In: Felicitas Heimann-Jelinek, Lothar Hoelbling and Ingo Zechner (eds.), Ordnung muss sein. Das Archiv der Israelitischen Kultusgemeinde Wien, Exhibition Catalog. Vienna: Jewish Museum Vienna 2007. p. 16-19. (ISBN 978-3-901398-45-2)
- 'Achtung Baustelle! Die Arbeiten an der Wiedererrichtung des Archivs der Israelitischen Kultusgemeinde Wien' (together with Lothar Hoelbling). In: Felicitas Heimann-Jelinek, Lothar Hoelbling and Ingo Zechner (eds.), Ordnung muss sein. Das Archiv der Israelitischen Kultusgemeinde Wien, Exhibition Catalog. Vienna: Jewish Museum Vienna 2007. p. 29-34. (ISBN 978-3-901398-45-2)
- 'Konfrontationen mit der Geschichte. Die Anlaufstelle der Israelitischen Kultusgemeinde Wien fuer juedische NS-Verfolgte'. In: Das Juedische Echo. Europaeisches Forum fuer Kultur und Politik. Vol. 56. Vienna: 2007. p. 118-123.
- 'Von der Etablierung einer Hilfswissenschaft. Provenienzforschung in den österreichischen Bundesmuseen und Sammlungen'. In: Christoph Bazil, Eva Blimlinger et al. (eds.), ...wesentlich mehr Fälle als angenommen. 10 Jahre Kommission für Provenienzforschung. Vienna: Böhlau Verlag 2009. p. 70-84. (ISBN 978-3-205-78183-7)
- 'Nicht schuldig? Film, Beweis und Urteil'. In: Anders Engberg-Pedersen, Michael Huffmaster, Eric Nordhausen, Vrääth Öhner (eds.): Das Geständnis und seine Instanzen. Zur Bedeutungsverschiebung des Geständnisses im Prozess der Moderne. Vienna: Turia+Kant 2011. p. 85-102. (ISBN 978-3-85132-638-3)
- 'Elementares Kino: Fünf Notizen zu Hans Richters Rhythmus 21'. In: Forschungsnetzwerk BTWH (eds.): Hans Richters Rhythmus 21. Schlüsselfilm der Moderne. Würzburg: Königshausen & Neumann 2012. p. 91-102. (ISBN 978-3-8260-4861-6)
- 'Ökonomie des Überflusses: Der andere neue Mensch'. In: Karin Fest, Sabrina Rahman, Marie-Noëlle Yazdanpanah (eds.): Mies van der Rohe, Richter, Graeff & Co. Alltag und Design in der Avantgardezeitschrift G. Vienna - Berlin: Turia+Kant 2014. p. 132-140. (ISBN 978-3-85132-736-6)
- 'Wie man einen Film dreht. Anleitungen für Amateure'. In: Siegfried Mattl, Carina Lesky, Vrääth Öhner, Ingo Zechner (eds.): Abenteuer Alltag. Zur Archäologie des Amateurfilms (= FilmmuseumSynemaPublikationen 25). Vienna: Synema 2015. p. 17-28. (ISBN 978-3-901644-63-4)
- 'Warum Israel. Eine Einleitung'. In: Oskar Deutsch (ed.): Die Zukunft Europas und das Judentum. Impulse zu einem gesellschaftlichen Diskurs. Vienna - Cologne - Weimar: Böhlau Verlag 2017. p. 39-52. (ISBN 978-3-205-20531-9)
- 'Eichmanns Zwischenbilanz'. In: Wolfgang Maderthaner (ed.): Österreich. 99 Dokumente, Briefe, Urkunden. Vienna: Brandstätter Verlag 2018. p. 448-453. (ISBN 978-3710601934)
