= Stanley Burton Centre for Holocaust Studies =

British teaching and research centre established 1990

Stanley Burton Centre for Holocaust and Genocide Studies
- 52.62123442535146°N 1.1237759425511118°W
- Location: Leicester, England
- Type: Academic library
- Established: 1990

Other information
- Affiliation: University of Leicester
- Website: le.ac.uk/stanley-burton

The Stanley Burton Centre for Holocaust and Genocide Studies (SBC) is a teaching and research centre located within the school of history at the University of Leicester.

== The Centre ==
The centre was founded by historian Aubrey Newman in 1990 and is the oldest Holocaust research facility at a British university. It was named the Stanley Burton Centre in 1993 after Stanley Burton of Leeds endowed a Lectureship in Jewish Studies at the University of Leicester. It was renamed the Centre for Holocaust and Genocide Studies in 2011, with an expanded focus on other cases of mass violence in Europe and its colonies from the 19th to the 21st century. The SBC operates a specialist library on the Holocaust.

=== Activities ===
The SBC organises an annual conference on the Holocaust, attracting Holocaust historians to the university. Speakers have included Yehuda Bauer, Deborah Lipstadt, Richard Overy, Martin Gilbert, David Cesarani and Christopher Browning. Each year, the centre holds a "Holocaust Awareness Week", with films, seminars and public lectures. The centre also operates outreach programs in the local community to raise awareness of the Holocaust. Student volunteers largely run the centre.

== Mission Statement from the University website ==
The Stanley Burton Centre sets out:

- To conduct research into the Holocaust, its implications and subjects closely related to it, including Jewish history, inter-faith relations, anti-Semitism and racism, fascism and extreme right-wing political movements, crimes against humanity and genocides.
- To foster the study of the Holocaust and these related subjects at an undergraduate and postgraduate level, to develop and disseminate advanced knowledge and reflection on the issues and values they raise.
- To promote an understanding of the Holocaust and these related subjects amongst the general public, to inform and encourage a wider social reflection on the issues and values they raise.
- To expand the production of scholarly publications in these areas to bring the particular contribution of the Stanley Burton Centre in order to current debates on the Holocaust and its related issues.
- To create and develop links with other institutions and individuals sharing the aims and objectives of the centre.
- To provide a physical location within the University of Leicester to centralise, co-ordinate and develop these activities.

== Links with other institutions ==
The Burton Centre maintains ties with the Wiener Library in London, the National Holocaust Centre and Museum in Laxton as well as with research centres in other universities.
