= Erika Weinzierl =

Austrian historian

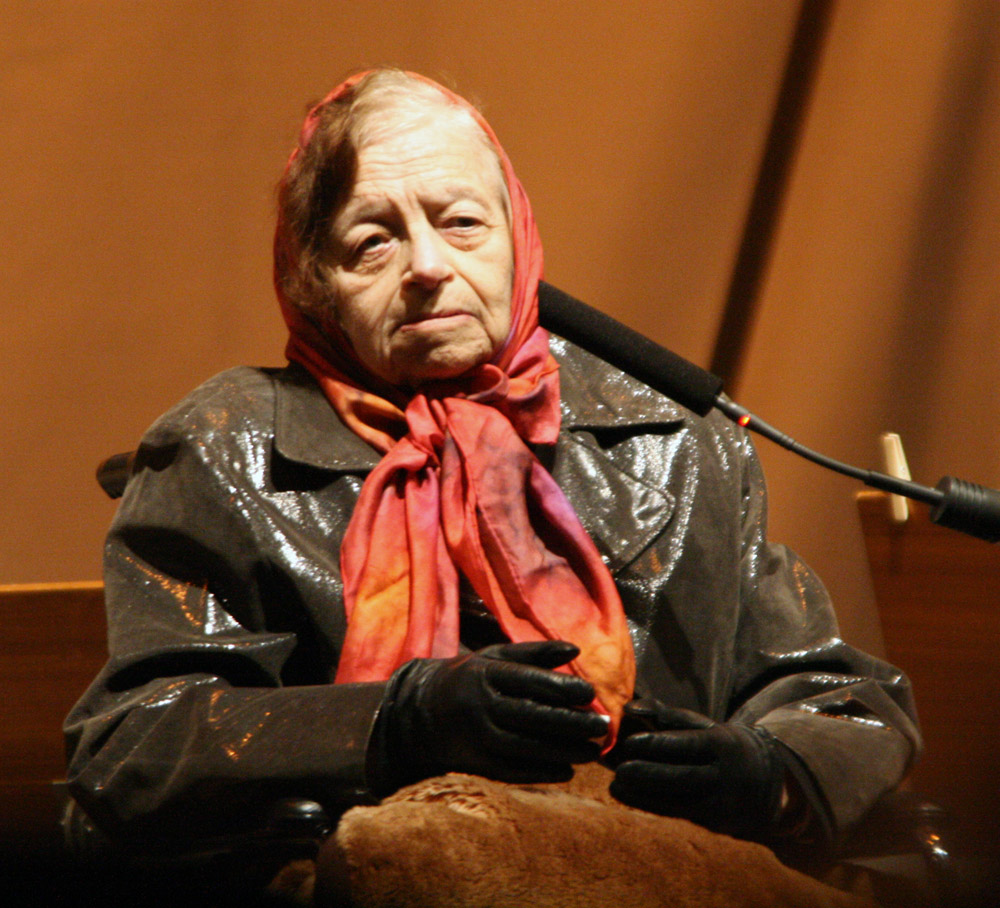
Weinzierl in 2008

Erika Weinzierl (née Fischer; 6 June 1925 – 28 October 2014) was an Austrian historian, gender researcher, and historian of Nazism. A member of the Austrian People's Party and the Curatorium of the Austrian Mauthausen Committee, she was the second director of the Department of Contemporary History of the University of Vienna, succeeding Ludwig Jedlicka. Weinzierl was a recipient of the Austrian Decoration for Science and Art, the Preis der Stadt Wien für Geisteswissenschaften, the Benemerenti medal, and the Theodor Körner Prize.

== Biography ==
Erika Fischer was born on 6 June 1925 in Vienna, Austria. She graduated from the University of Vienna.

She headed the Ludwig Boltzmann Institute for the History of Social Sciences and was a full professor at the University of Salzburg and the University of Vienna. For a long time, she was one of the few women in the German-speaking world and the only one in Austria on a history ordinariate. She received many awards for her critical examination of civil society under National Socialism. For many years, she stood up to the "Anti-Semitism Campaign in Austria", of which she later became honorary president.

The author of books and numerous articles, Weinzierl published about 700 titles. She was also editor or co-editor of 30 books, including the monthly or bi-monthly zeitgeschichte ("Journal of Contemporary History") from 1973. She also edited a series of publications of the Institute for Ecclesiastical History, the Historical Institute of University of Salzburg, the Ludwig Boltzmann Institute for the History of Social Sciences (with Wolfgang Huber), and materials on contemporary history (with Rudolf G. Ardelt and Karl Stuhlpfarrer).

She died on 28 October 2014 in Vienna.

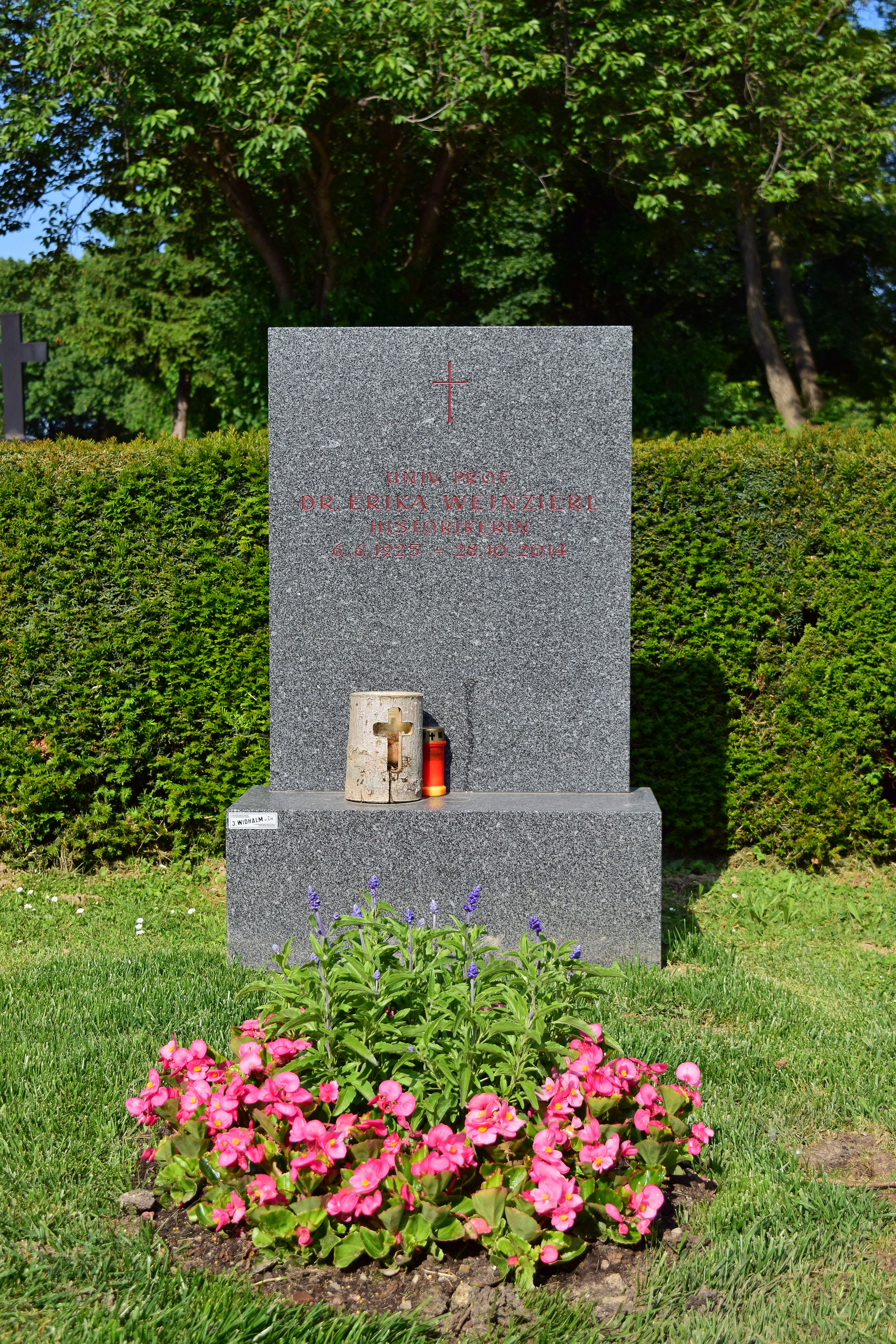
Grave of Erika Weinzierl

== Awards ==
- 1952, Pontifical Medal of Merit Benemerenti
- 1979, Premio Adelaide Ristori of the Centro Culturale Italiano in Rome
- 1985, Austrian Cross of Honor for Science and Art I. Class
- 1985, Silver medal of the state of Salzburg
- 1985, Medal of Honor of the Federal Capital Vienna in gold
- 1988, Austrian State Prize for Cultural Journalism
- 1992, Dr. Hertha Firnberg State Prize for special achievements in the field of science and research
- 1994, Prize of the City of Vienna for the humanities
- 1995, Bruno Kreisky Prize for the political book of the Dr. Karl Renner Institute (for her complete works)
- 1996, Joseph Samuel Bloch Medal of Action Against Anti-Semitism in Austria
- 1998, Wilhelm Hartel Prize of the Austrian Academy of Sciences
- 1999, Golden Doctorate of the GWF of the University of Vienna
- 2000, Prize of the city of Vienna for public education
- 2000, Great Silver Medal for Services to the Republic of Austria
- 2002, Ring of Honor of the City of Vienna (for her commitment to the fight against anti-Semitism)
- 2003, non-fiction book "danubius" of the book club Donauland and the ORF (for her life's work)
- 2006, Viennese E. Chargaff Prize of the Research Center for Ethics and Science in Dialogue
- 2008, Honorary Prize of the Press Club Concordia (for her life's work, especially for her fight against anti-Semitism)
- 2010, Women's Lifetime Achievement Award of the Federal Minister for Women and Public Service

== Movies ==
- Erika Weinzierl – A portrait. Film by Peter Grundei and Ronald P. Vaughan [for the 85th birthday]. ORF, Austria 2010.
