= Renate Wagner-Rieger =

Austrian art historian and educator (1921–1980)

- Born: Renate Rieger; 10 January 1921; Vienna, Austria
- Died: 11 December 1980 (aged 59); Vienna, Austria
- Known for: scholar of Austrian art history and architecture history
- Spouse: Walter Wagner (m. 1956)

Academic background
- Education: University of Vienna
- Thesis: Die Fassade des Wiener Wohnhauses vom 16. bis zur Mitte des 18. Jahrhunderts (English: The Facade of The Viennese House From the 16th to the Middle of the 18th Century) (1947)
- Doctoral advisor: Karl Maria Swoboda

Renate Wagner-Rieger (10 January 1921 – 11 December 1980, her maiden name is Renate Rieger) was an Austrian art historian and educator, with significant research in the fields of architecture and historicism.

== Education and career ==
Renate Rieger was born on 10 January 1921 in Vienna. In 1942 she studied art history at the University of Vienna, under Hans Sedlmayr and Karl Oettinger and received her PhD in 1947 under Karl Maria Swoboda on the architectural facade of the Viennese apartments from the 16th to the mid-18th century. In 1956 she became a lecturer at University of Vienna and in the same year married historian Walter Wagner.

In 1964 she presented to the International Congress of Art History in Bonn her research on early gothic architecture in Italy and a paper on historicism which brought her to international attention.

In 1971 Renate Wagner-Rieger was appointed full professor at University of Vienna, she was the first woman in the history department to hold this position.

Wagner-Rieger paid particular attention to previously neglected and partially devalued era of Historicism in architecture (the breakdown in romantic historicism, strict historicism and late historicism stems from it) and important contributions towards the study of Gründerzeit. In 1968 she initiated the large-scale research project called "Wiener Ringstraße", also known as "The Ringstraße: Image of an Era: the expansion of the inner city of Vienna under Emperor Franz Joseph" which studied the ring road in the historic center of Vienna.

Renate Wagner-Rieger died in Vienna, after a brief illness at age 59 on 11 December 1980.

== Publications ==
- Wagner-Rieger, Renate (1956–1957). Italian Architecture at the Beginning of the Gothic (2 volumes). Austria: University of Graz Austria.
- Wagner-Rieger, Renate (1957) "The Vienna townhouse Baroque and Classicism"
- Wagner-Rieger, Renate (1962) "The lock to Spittal an der Drau in Carinthia"
- Wagner-Rieger, Renate (1969). The Ringstrasse: Image of an Era: the expansion of the inner city of Vienna under Emperor Franz Joseph. University of Vienna.
- Wagner-Rieger, Renate (1970) "Vienna's architecture in the 19th century"
- Wagner-Rieger, Renate (1972). The House of Austrian Academy of Sciences, for the 125th Anniversary of the Academy (in German). Vienna. p. 55. ISBN 9783205030225.
- Wagner-Rieger, Renate; Krause, Walter (1975). Historicism and Palace. Studies on the art of the nineteenth century. München : Prestel. p. 365. ISBN 9783791301037.
- Wagner-Rieger, Renate; Reissberger, Mara (1980). Theophil von Hansen. Bd. 8, T. 4 (in German). Wiesbaden : Steiner. p. 88. ISBN 3515026762.

== Literature ==
- Fellner, Fritz; Corradini, Doris (2006). Österreichische Geschichtswissenschaft im 20. Jahrhundert. Ein biographisch-bibliographisches Lexikon [Austrian History in the 20th Century: A Biographical-Bibliographical Lexicon]. Volume 99 of Veröffentlichungen der Kommission für Neuere Geschichte Österreichs, Kommission für Neuere Geschichte Österreichs. Vienna: Böhlau. p. 435. ISBN 9783205774761.

== Awards and honors ==
- 1976: Prize of the City of Vienna for the Humanities (Preis der Stadt Wien für Geisteswissenschaften)
- 1998: Wagner-Rieger-Tor, passage from courtyard 8 to courtyard 9, within the “Gates of Remembrance” on the campus of the University of Vienna
