= Department of Contemporary History of the University of Vienna =

Research institute in Austria

The Department of Contemporary History of the University of Vienna (German: Institut für Zeitgeschichte der Universität Wien) is a scientific institution for the study of contemporary history. The headquarters of the institute is on the campus of the University of Vienna in the Alsergrund district of Vienna. It has about 30 scientific members (as of 2006), about half of them on the staff of the University of Vienna and the other half Privatdozenten who are assigned to the institute. The institute is run as a member of the association of the Vienna Wiesenthal Institute for Holocaust Studies.

The Institute of Contemporary History was established on 3 June 1966 by the Austrian Federal Ministry of Education. The historian Ludwig Jedlicka, co-founder of the Documentation Centre of Austrian Resistance (DÖW) and director of the Austrian Institute for Contemporary History (since 1961) became the first director of the new institute. His successor was the historian Erika Weinzierl, who developed the research in the fields of antisemitism and exile and emigration during the time of Nazism. later directors were Gerhard Botz, Friedrich Stadler and Oliver Rathkolb. The current director of the institute is Johanna Gehmacher (since 2012).
