= Oliver Rathkolb =

Austrian historian (b. 1955)

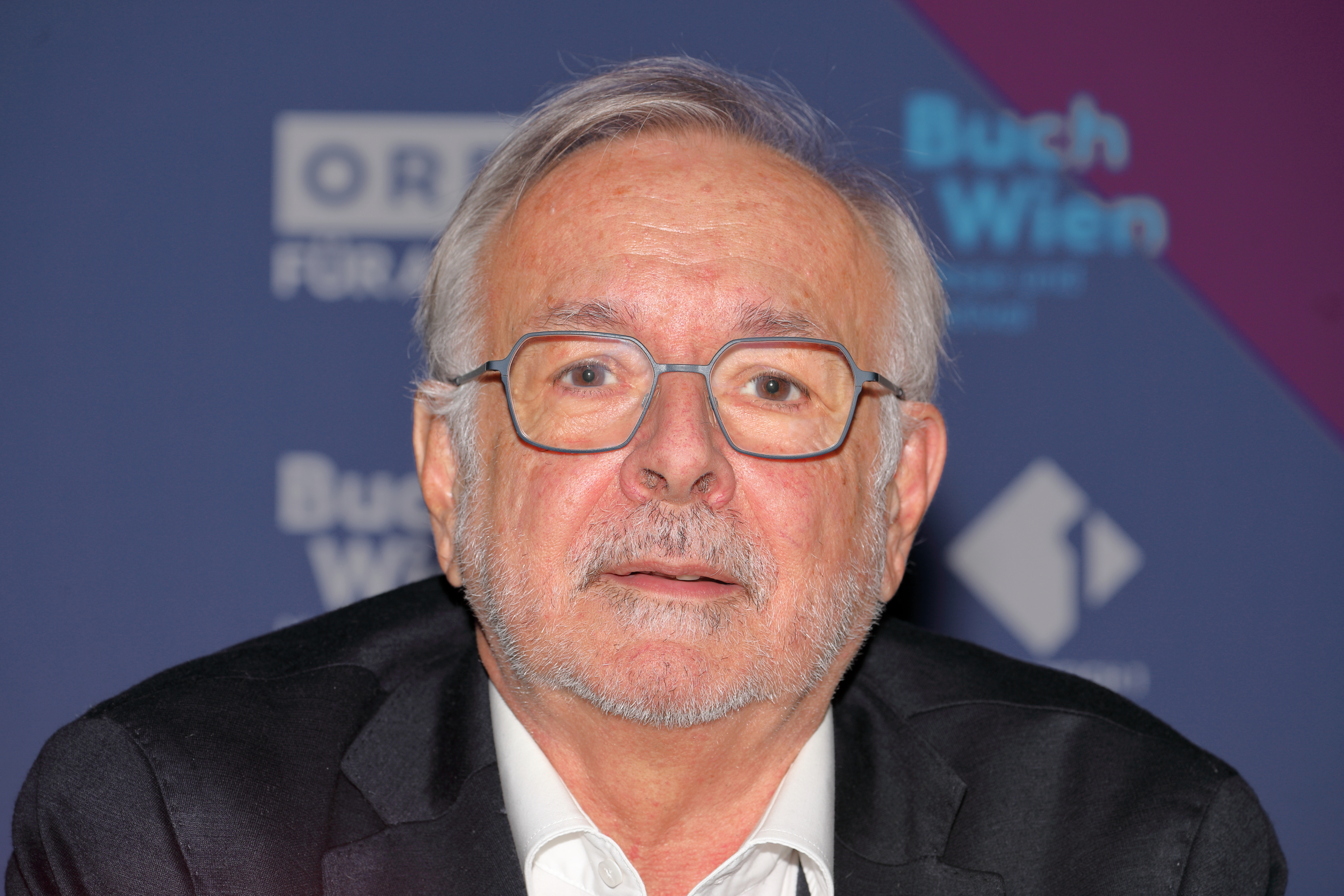
Oliver Rathkolb

Oliver Rathkolb (born 3 November 1955 in Vienna) is an Austrian historian and professor for contemporary history at the University of Vienna.

== Career ==
Rathkolb studied history and law at the University of Vienna and achieved his doctorate in 1982 at the same university.

He was chief scientist of the Bruno-Kreisky-Archives Foundation from 1985 to 2003 and has been scientific coordinator of the Bruno Kreisky Forum for International Dialogue since 1992.

Rathkolb had been scientific employee of the Ludwig Boltzmann Institute for history and society from 1983 until 2005 and its co-director since 1994. He had also taken over the office of director of the Ludwig Boltzmann Institute's European history and public department.

Rathkolb received his authorization to teach as a lecturer of contemporary history at the Department of Contemporary History of the University of Vienna in 1993 and became a university professor and director of the Department of Contemporary History of the University of Vienna in 2008.

Rathkolb has been a member of the advisory board of the House of European History since 2009 and chairman of the scientific advisory panel of the Theodor Körner Prize since 2006.

In 2000 and 2001 he had a research-professorship at Harvard University and was guest professor at the University of Chicago in 2003. He also lectured at the Diplomatic Academy of Vienna, the University of Salzburg, at Duke University and the University of Maryland.

He has been the managing editor of the magazine zeitgeschichte since 2002.

== Controversies ==
Rathkolb has been a member of the Social Democratic Party of Austria (SPÖ) since 1985. His closeness to the SPÖ is regularly cause for criticism of his positions and caused astonishment when he suggested the ÖVP-led Ministry of the Interior the so-called concept of "neutralization" for Hitler's birthplace. Furthermore, he recommended to relocate the memorial stone erected in 1989 by SPÖ Mayor Gerhard Skiba in the Vienna-based House of Austrian History . On 4 July 2020 the SPÖ demonstrated in Braunau for the retention of the memorial stone. On 8 July 2020 the SPÖ spokeswoman for culture of remembrance, Sabine Schatz, submitted a motion to the National Council calling on Interior Minister Karl Nehammer to ensure that the memorial stone against war and fascism in front of Adolf Hitler's birthplace remains in place.

== Books ==
- Baldur von Schirach: Nazi Leader and Head of the Hitler Youth. Translated by John Heath, 2022. ISBN 9781399020961
