= Documentation Centre of Austrian Resistance =

Documentation Centre of Austrian Resistance (DÖW) Dokumentationsarchiv des österreichischen Widerstandes
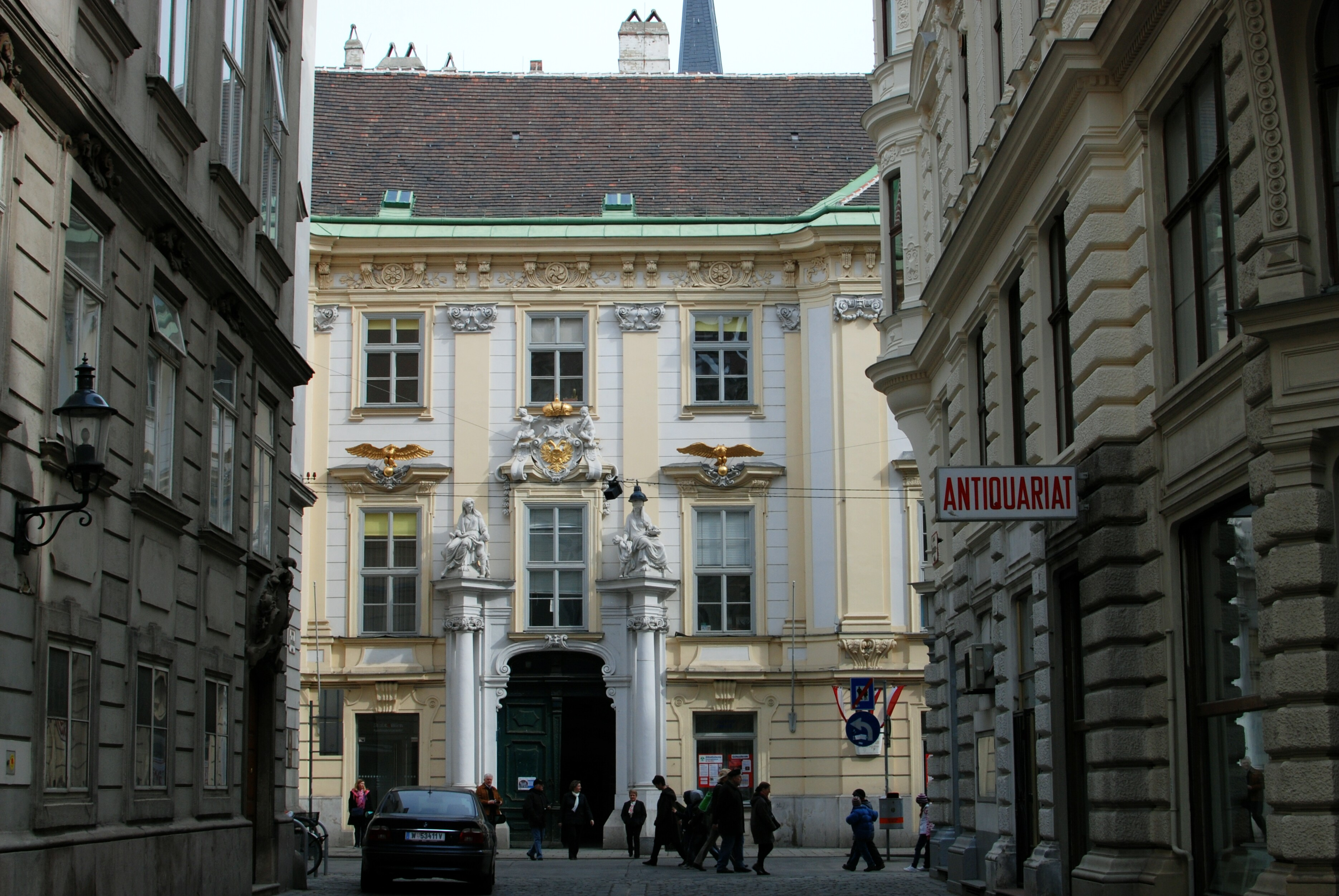
- Formation: 1963
- Headquarters: Altes Rathaus (former city hall), Wipplingerstraße 6-8, Vienna, Austria
- Director: Andreas Kranebitter (since April 2023)
- Website: http://www.doew.at/

The Documentation Centre of Austrian Resistance (DÖW) was established in 1963. Its main topics deal with research concerning resistance and persecution from 1938 until 1945, exile, Nazi crimes, right-wing extremism after 1945, and victims' reparations.

Its main seat is located in the former town hall of Vienna on Wipplingerstraße.

== History ==
The Documentation Centre of Austrian Resistance was founded on February 11, 1963, by Ludwig Jedlicka, August Maria Knoll, Paul Schärf, Ludwig Soswinski and Herbert Steiner, former members of the Austrian resistance, victims of NS-persecution, and committed scholars from the sciences and humanities. The late foundation 18 years after the end of World War II is explained by the hostile political and social environment that existed in Austria in the postwar years, which was still dominated by participants of the World War and former Nazis. Resistance was long seen as an act of cowardice, treason and murder.

A landmark in the development of the center was the establishment of the DÖW Foundation in 1983, which is supported by the Austrian Federal Government, the City of Vienna, and the DÖW Society, thus putting the center on a sound financial footing. From its modest beginnings, when work was carried out mainly by idealistic victims of Fascism and later by a qualified younger staff, the center has developed into an authoritative institution, respected in Austria and abroad. The focal points of the center's broad range of tasks can be summarized as follows:

- Resistance and persecution
- Exile
- Nazi crimes, in particular the Holocaust, Nazi concentration camps, and criminal medical policies
- The justice system in the Nazi era and the prosecution of Nazi criminals in the postwar era
- Right-wing extremism since 1945, (neo-Nazi) Holocaust denial
- Welfare service for victims of Nazism, restitution and compensation since 1945

== Activities ==
The activity of the center encompasses the following areas:

- Collecting and archiving relevant source material and its scientific evaluation; publications
- Managing archive and library; advising or supervising students, pupils, journalists, and other visitors
- Managing the highly valuable Oral History-collection (2800 tapes from more than 1000 interviews) and the extensive databases created in recent years (Austrian victims of the Holocaust, political victims of Nazism, those persecuted by the Gestapo and the Nazi justice system, Austrian anti-Fascists in the Spanish Civil War, etc.)
- Informing the younger generation and adults about the crimes of National Socialism by compiling teaching material for schools, organizing groups to visit the DÖW and its permanent exhibition, providing victims of Nazism with opportunities to talk in schools, offering courses at university, etc.
- Updating the center's homepage www.doew.at with details of events, the presentation of projects and their findings, book reviews, current news on the extreme right-wing scene; servicing the databases mentioned above.
