= Nick Taylor (author) =

American non-fiction author

- Born: Asheville, North Carolina
- Occupations: Author; journalist; ghostwriter; editor
- Writing career
- Years active: 1980–present
- Genres: Biography, memoir, history, true crime
- Notable works: American-Made: the Enduring Legacy of the WPA; When FDR Put the Nation to Work
- Website: www.nicktayloronline.com

Nick Taylor is an American non-fiction author, journalist, editor and ghostwriter. He has written on a wide range of subjects and produced a number of best-selling books working with notable figures including John Glenn, Peter G. Peterson and Yaron Svoray. Nick Taylor received the literary Christopher Award for the American-Made: the Enduring Legacy of the WPA; When FDR Put the Nation to Work in 2009. He co-authored with John Glenn the U.S. Senator and astronaut's 1999 autobiography John Glenn: A Memoir, and wrote, with former U.S. Commerce Secretary and private equity pioneer Peter G. Peterson, Peterson's memoir, The Education of an American Dreamer. Taylor also wrote, jointly with Yaron Svoray, In Hitler's Shadow: An Israeli's Amazing Journey Inside Germany's Neo-Nazi Movement, a book based on true story of the journalist's investigation Neo-Nazis in Germany in 1992–1993. The book became an HBO movie, The Infiltrator (1995 film), starring Oliver Platt. He is a frequent speaker and lecturer on the Works Progress Administration (WPA) and the New Deal.

== Early life ==
Nick Taylor was born in Asheville and spent his early life in Waynesville, North Carolina. His father worked as a land surveyor and a draftsman and his mother was a journalist. When Taylor was about eight years old, his family moved to Fort Myers Beach, Florida. Taylor attended Fort Myers Senior High School and graduated from Western Carolina University with a B.A. degree in English and Professional Writing.

== Works ==
- American-Made: the Enduring Legacy of the WPA: When FDR Put the Nation to Work, Nick Taylor, 2008, Bantam Books
- Laser: The Inventor, the Nobel Laureate, and the Thirty-Year Patent War, Nick Taylor, 2000, Simon and Schuster
- A Necessary End, Nick Taylor, 1994, Nan A. Talese
- Ordinary Miracles: Life in a Small Church, Nick Taylor, 1993, Simon and Schuster
- Sins of the Father: The True Story of a Family Running from the Mob, Nick Taylor, 1989, Simon and Schuster
- Bass Wars: A Story of Fishing, Fame, and Fortune, Nick Taylor, 1988, McGraw-Hill

== In collaboration ==
- The Education of an American Dreamer: How a Son of Greek Immigrants Learned His Way from a Nebraska Diner to Washington, Wall Street, and Beyond, Nick Taylor with Peter G. Peterson, 2010, Grand Central Publishing
- John Glenn: A Memoir, John Glenn with Nick Taylor, 1999, Bantam Books
- Healing Lessons, Sidney J. Winawer, M.D., with Nick Taylor, 1998, Little, Brown
- In Hitler's Shadow: An Israeli's Amazing Journey Inside Germany's Neo-Nazi Movement, Yaron Svoray and Nick Taylor, 1994, Nan A. Talese

== Selective publications ==
- Taylor, Nick (9 December 2008). "F.D.R. Knew How to Spend Carefully". The New York Times.
- Taylor, Nick (22 October 2005). "But Not at Writers' Expense". The Washington Post.

== Literary awards ==
- Christopher Award in the category "Books for Adults" for the American-Made: the Enduring Legacy of the WPA; When FDR Put the Nation to Work

== Screen adaptations ==
- The Infiltrator (1995 film), a 1995 TV movie starring Oliver Platt
