= Jewish Historical Documentation Centre =

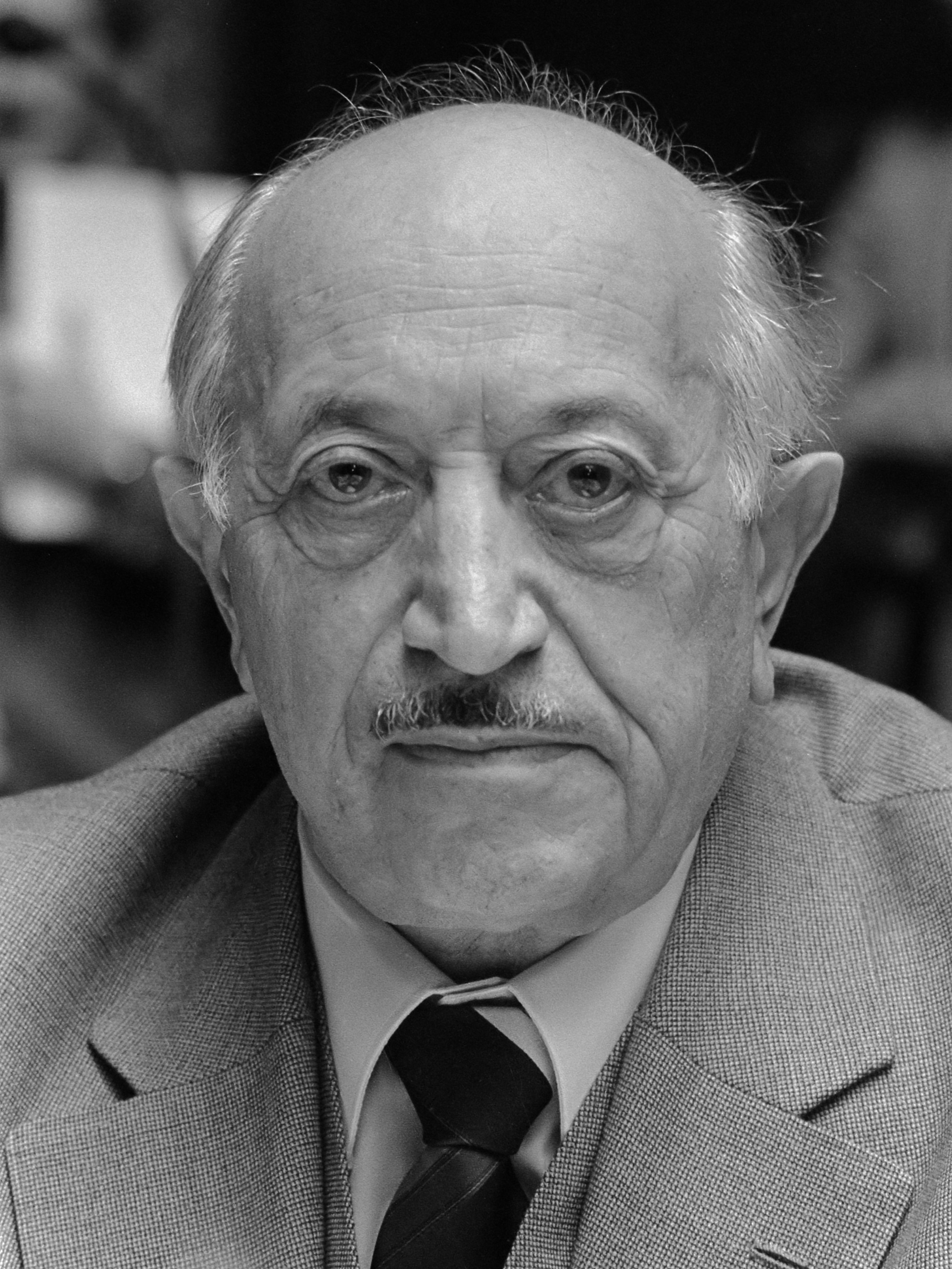
Simon Wiesenthal

The Jewish Historical Documentation Centre (Zentrum für jüdische historische Dokumentation) was an office headed by Simon Wiesenthal in Linz. The centre collected and promulgated information about war crimes, specific mainly to crimes against the Jewish people as perpetrated by Nazi Germany in Europe during the Second World War.

The centre has been responsible for uncovering more than 1000 Nazi war criminals, including Adolf Eichmann, sometimes referred to as "the architect of the Holocaust". The office was also interested in the whereabouts of alleged Nazi war criminals who may have escaped justice, including those individuals who escaped through the Nazi ratlines to havens in South America, particularly to Argentina, Paraguay, Brazil, and Chile.

This Centre closed in 1954.

== History ==
Simon Wiesenthal was a Holocaust survivor who was noted for his work as a Nazi hunter who pursued Nazi war criminals. After being liberated from the Mauthausen-Gusen concentration camp by the U.S. Army, Wiesenthal began gathering and preparing evidence on Nazi atrocities for the War Crimes Section of the United States Army. When his association with the United States Army ended in 1947, Wiesenthal and thirty volunteers opened the Jewish Historical Documentation Centre in Linz, Austria, for the purpose of assembling evidence for future trials. However, as the Cold War between the United States and the Soviet Union intensified, both sides lost interest in prosecuting Germans, and Wiesenthal's volunteers, succumbing to frustration, drifted away to more ordinary pursuits. In 1954, the office in Linz was closed, and its files were given to the Yad Vashem Archives in Israel, except for the dossier on Adolf Eichmann.

== Successor ==
In 1959, acting on information provided by Wiesenthal and other Nazi hunters, Eichmann was captured by Mossad agents in Argentina, transported to Israel where he was tried and executed. Encouraged, in 1961, Simon Wiesenthal founded the Documentation Centre of the Association of Jewish Victims of the Nazi Regime (Dokumentationszentrum des Bundes Jüdischer Verfolgter des Naziregimes) in Vienna, which concentrated exclusively on the hunting of war criminals.

The centre in Vienna was housed in a nondescript, sparsely furnished three-room office in Vienna's old Jewish quarter with a staff of four, including Wiesenthal. The centre had open files on about 2,000 cases, however, Wiesenthal estimated that about 150,000 Nazis were involved in war crimes and that his office's extensive archives were just "the tip of the iceberg". According to the centre, about 40,000 Nazis have been tried for war crimes since the end of the war, and most were found guilty.

The centre developed a department to track anti-Semitism and right-wing extremism. Since 2003, the association has been indexing its holdings with the aid of an electronic database to increase its availability for users. The Centre is an integral, but independent part of the Vienna Wiesenthal Institute for Holocaust Studies (VWI).

== See also ==
- Center of Contemporary Jewish Documentation (Grenoble)
