= Murderers Among Us: The Simon Wiesenthal Story =

- Genre: Biography; Drama; War
- Written by: Abby Mann; Robin Vote; Ron Hutchinson
- Directed by: Brian Gibson
- Starring: Ben Kingsley; Renée Soutendijk; Craig T. Nelson; Anton Lesser; Jack Shepherd; Paul Freeman
- Theme music composer: Bill Conti
- Country of origin: United States
- Original language: English

Production
- Executive producers: Graham Benson; David R. Ginsburg
- Producers: Robert Cooper; John Kemeny; Abby Mann
- Cinematography: Elemér Ragályi
- Editors: Éva Gárdos; Randy Kumano; Chris Wimble
- Running time: 160 minutes
- Production companies: Citadel Entertainment; TVS Films; HBO Pictures; Hungarian Television

Original release
- Network: HBO
- Release: April 23, 1989

Murderers Among Us: The Simon Wiesenthal Story is a 1989 American biographical film directed by Brian Gibson and written by Abby Mann, Robin Vote and Ron Hutchinson. The film stars Ben Kingsley, Renée Soutendijk, Craig T. Nelson, Anton Lesser, Jack Shepherd and Paul Freeman.

== Plot ==
The film is based on Wiesenthal's book of the same name that was published in 1967.

As Austrian Jews living in Ukraine at the beginning of World War II, Simon Wiesenthal and his family are captured by Nazis and sent to live in a series of prison camps, where Wiesenthal cheats death several times. When he is liberated from Mauthausen in 1945, Wiesenthal provides vital information to the Americans in the Nuremberg War Trials and dedicates his life to hunting down Nazi war criminals, even though doing so comes at a cost to his family.

== Cast ==
- Ben Kingsley as Simon Wiesenthal
- Renée Soutendijk as Cyla
- Craig T. Nelson as Major Bill Harcourt
- Anton Lesser as Karl
- Jack Shepherd as Brodi
- Paul Freeman as Josef
- David Threlfall as Alex
- Louisa Milwood-Haigh as Paulina
- Robert Morelli as Reed
- Sándor Téri as Hauptmann

== Release ==
The film premiered at the 1989 US Film Festival presented by the Sundance Institute in two parts on January 21 and 22, 1989 The film was shown on HBO on April 23, 1989.

== Awards and nominations ==
- 41st Primetime Emmy Awards, Los Angeles: Outstanding Writing in a Miniseries or a Special, 1989
- CableACE Award: Best Movie or Miniseries, 1990
- Funke Mediengruppe, Germany: Golden Camera Award for Best International Actor, Ben Kingsley, 1990
- 5th TCA Awards, Los Angeles: Nominee: Program of the Year, 1989
- CableACE Award: Nominee: Best Actress in a Movie or Miniseries, Renée Soutendijk 1990
- CableACE Award: Nominee: Best Actor in a Miniseries or a Special, Ben Kingsley, 1990
- 41st Primetime Emmy Awards, Los Angeles: Nominee: Outstanding Drama or Comedy Special, 1989
- 41st Primetime Emmy Awards, Los Angeles: Nominee: Outstanding Lead Actor in a Miniseries or a Special, Ben Kingsley, 1989
- 47th Golden Globe Awards, Los Angeles: Nominee: Best Performance by an Actor in a Miniseries or Motion Picture Made for Television, Ben Kinglsey, 1990

== See also ==
- The Boys from Brazil (1978) — Film starring Laurence Olivier (in his final Oscar-nominated performance) as a Nazi hunter character, loosely based upon Simon Wiesenthal.

== Music ==
- Composer by Bill Conti
- Music by Harry Rabin
