= List of awards and honours received by Simon Wiesenthal =

Simon Wiesenthal, KBE (December 31, 1908 – September 20, 2005) was an Austrian Holocaust survivor who became famous after World War II for his work as a Nazi hunter. He was presented with many awards, merits, and honorary doctorates over the course of his life.

== State awards ==
Decoration for Services to the Liberation of Austria	1979
Commander of the Order of Orange-Nassau	Netherlands
Commander of the Order of Merit of the Italian Republic	given by the Italian President Pertini, 20 July 1979
Congressional Gold Medal	United States of America; March 17, 1980
Commander of the Order of Merit of the Grand Duchy of Luxembourg	1981
Grand Cross of the Order of Merit of the Federal Republic of Germany	from the President of the German Federal Republic, 1985
Chevalier of the Légion d'Honneur	France, 1986
Cross of Honour for Science and Art	Austria, 1993
Commander's Cross of the Polonia Restituta	Poland, 1994
Commander of the Order of Merit of the Grand Duchy of Luxembourg	1995
Title “Professor”	awarded by Austrian Federal President, Thomas Klestil, 1997
Silver Decoration of the Bosnian Coat of Arms	1998
Order of the White Lion	Czech Republic, presented by President Václav Havel, 1999
Great Cross of the Order of Bernardo O'Higgins	Chile, 1999
Presidential Medal of Freedom	United States of America, 9 August 2000
Honorary Knight Commander of the Order of the British Empire	19 February 2004; In recognition of a "lifetime of service to humanity" and for his work at the Simon Wiesenthal Center
Grand Decoration of Honour in Gold for Services to the Republic of Austria	9 June 2005

== Local government honors ==
Diploma of Honor of the City of Los Angeles, 1978
Diploma of Honor of the State of California
Honorary Citizen of Dallas, Texas, 1979
Honorary Citizen of Louisville, Kentucky, USA, 1979
Jerusalem Medal, presented by the Town Council of Jerusalem, 1980
Proclamation of the City of New York - Day of Solidarity with Simon Wiesenthal, March 31, 1981
Honorary Citizen of Miami Beach, Florida, USA, 1983
Honorary Citizen of Memphis, Tennessee, USA, 1984
Honorary Citizen of Shelby County, Tennessee, USA, 1984
The Assembly, Senate and Governor Mario M.Cuomo of the State of New York declare June 13, 1984 as "Simon Wiesenthal Day"
Grand Silver Medal of Honor for Merit; Federal State of Vienna, presented by Mayor Helmut Zilk, 1985
Jerusalem Medal in 1985
Medal of the City of Paris, 1992
Ring of Honor of the City of Linz, Austria, 1995
Honorary Citizen of the City of Vienna, 1995

== Organisations ==
Diploma of Honor of the Internationale de Résistance, Brussels, 1973
Dutch Medal for Freedom
Medal for Freedom of Luxemburg, 1973
Needle of Honor of the Austrian Resistance Movement
Diploma of Honor of the League of the United Nations
Annual Award of Merit of the Decalogue Society of Lawyers, Chicago, Illinois, 1978
Diploma of Honor of the Organization of Jewish War Veterans in USA
Honorary Member of the French Institut de Recherches de Psychotherapie
Jean-Moulin-Medaille, Medal of the French Resistance
Kaj-Munk-Medal, Denmark
Honorary Member of the Dutch Resistance
Honorary Member of the Danish Association of Freedom Fighters
Henrietta Szold Award, of the World WIZO Organization in the USA, 1979
14th Annual Susie Humanitarian Award of the Eddie Cantor Foundation, Los Angeles, 1980
Justice Louis Brandeis Award of the Zionist Organization in the USA, 1980
Medal of Honor of the Yad Vashem Foundation, Jerusalem
Member of the International Council of Yad Vashem, Jerusalem, 1980
David Award, Prize of Swiss Jewry for outstanding achievements, Jerusalem, 1981
Gold Medal of the Union of Jewish Congregations in Austria, 1982
Jabotinsky-Award of Anti-Defamation-League (ADL), 1988
Franklin D.Roosevelt Four Freedoms Award, Middelburg, Netherlands, 1990
Honorary President of the Austrian League for Human Rights, 1991
Otto Hahn Peace Medal in Gold; German Society of the United Nations, Berlin, 1991
National Hero Award, New York, United States, 1991
UNESCO Medal of Honor, presented by UNESCO Director-General, Federico Mayor, Paris, 1992
Erasmus Prize; for an important contribution to European culture and society, presented by Prince Bernhard of the Netherlands, 1992
Award of LAPID - The Movement to Commemorate the Implications of the Holocaust in Israel, 1993
Award of the Austrian Booksellers Association for Tolerance in Spirit and in Action, 1995
Dedication of the Simon Wiesenthal House of AMCHA (National Israeli Center for Psychosocial Support of Survivors of the Holocaust and the Second Generation), Tel Aviv, 1997
European Prize Pro Humanitate for Peace, Justice, and Tolerance, awarded by the Kultur-Fördergemeinschaft der Europäischen Wirtschaft, 1998
Luxembourg Freedom Medal
Decorations from French resistance groups
Decorations from Austrian resistance groups
Israel Liberata Gold Medal
World Tolerance Award; presented by Michael Gorbatschov on “Men’s World Day” in Vienna, 3 November 2000
Lo Tishkach Award, presented by the Conference of European Rabbis, Bratislava, Slovak Republic, 2000
Medal of Honor of the International Association of Prosecutors (IAP), The Hague, Netherlands, presented at the Documentation Center in Vienna, 17 April 2002
Postage stamp issued in his honour by Austria and Israel Post in 2010 World Stamp News

== Academic institutions ==
Wiesenthal was awarded 18 honorary doctorates from universities around the world, including seven faculties of law.

- Honorary member of the University of Applied Arts Vienna, 1989
- Honorary Member of the Academy of Science, Ljubljana, Slovenia, 1994
- Human Rights Award of the Karl Franzens University, Graz, Austria, 1994
- Honorary Doctorate from the Jagiellonian University, Kraków, 1994
- Honorary doctorate from the Ben-Gurion University of the Negev in Beersheba, Israel
