= Tuviah Friedman =

Israeli Nazi hunter (1922–2011)

- טוביה פרידמן
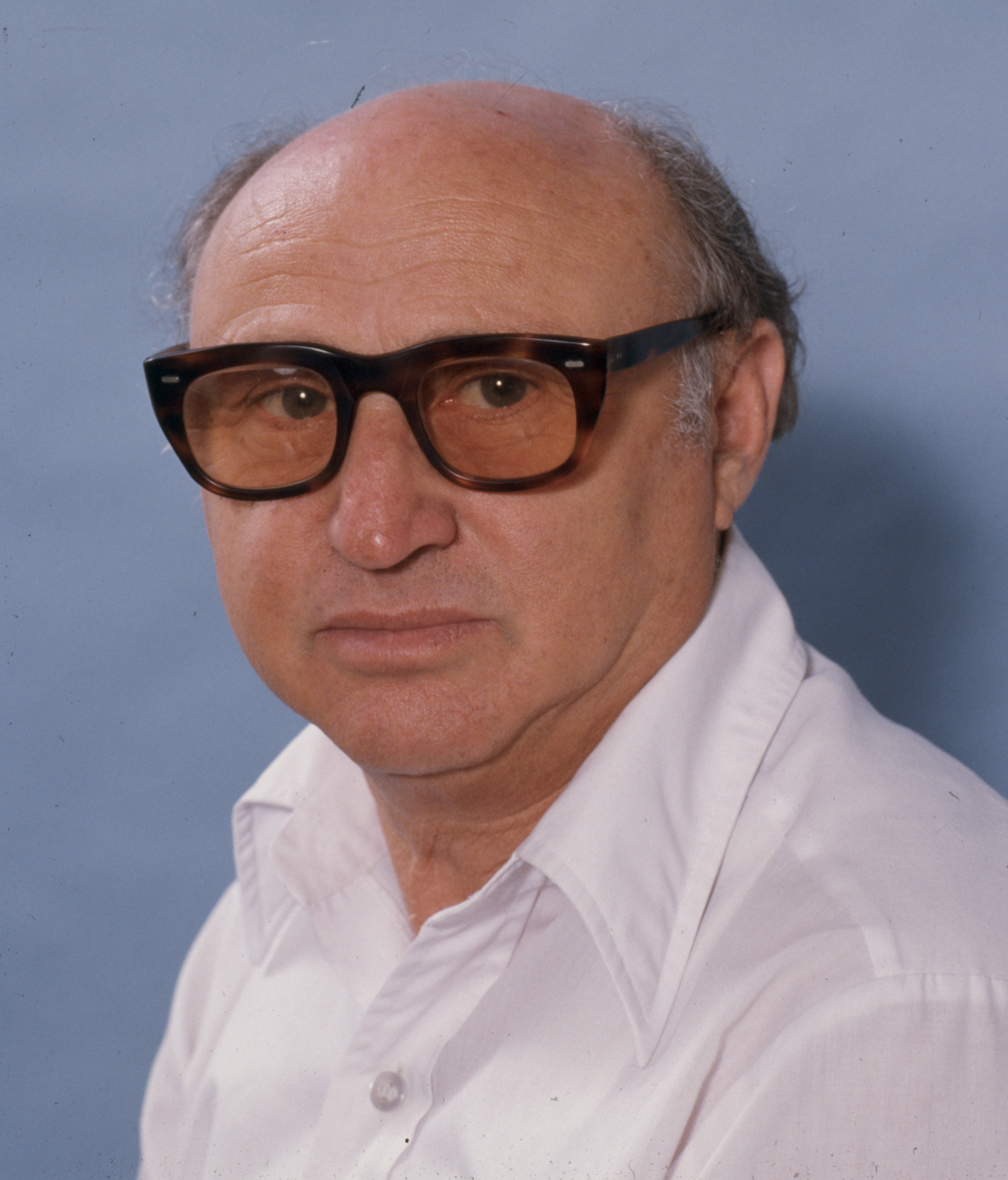
- Friedman, 1960–1970
- Born: 23 January 1922; Radom, Poland
- Died: 13 January 2011 (aged 88); Haifa, Israel
- Occupation: Nazi hunter
- Known for: Helping to capture Adolf Eichmann

Tuviah Friedman (Hebrew: טוביה פרידמן; 23 January 1922 – 13 January 2011) was a Nazi hunter and director of the Institute for the Documentation of Nazi War Crimes in Haifa, Israel.

Friedman was born in Radom, Poland, in 1922. During World War II he was imprisoned in a Nazi concentration camp near Radom, from which he escaped in 1944. The following year he was appointed an interrogation officer in the Gdańsk jail. From 1946 to 1952 he worked for Haganah Wien in Austria, as Director of Staff of the Documentation Center in Vienna, where he and his colleagues hunted down numerous Nazis. Afterwards, in Israel, he played a role in the capture of Adolf Eichmann.

== Papers ==
Friedman's autobiography is titled The Hunter. The archives at Yad Vashem in Israel contain dossiers on various Nazis, collected by Friedman.

== See also ==
- Serge and Beate Klarsfeld
- Yaron Svoray
- Elliot Welles
- Simon Wiesenthal
- Efraim Zuroff
