= Cyla Wiesenthal =

Polish-born Holocaust survivor and wife of Simon Wiesenthal

- Born: Cyla Müller; 9 August 1908; Buczek, Poland
- Died: 10 November 2003 (aged 95); Vienna, Austria
- Known for: Holocaust survivor, wife of Simon Wiesenthal
- Spouse: Simon Wiesenthal (m. 1936)
- Children: 1

Cyla Wiesenthal (née Müller; 9 August 1908– 10 November 2003) was a Polish-born Jewish Holocaust survivor during the Second World War. She was the wife of Nazi hunter and writer Simon Wiesenthal.

== Early life ==
Wiesenthal was born in 1908 in Buczek, near Łódź, then part of the Austro-Hungarian Empire. She met Simon Wiesenthal at grammar school and they married in 1936 in Polish-ruled Lviv (now Ukraine).

== Wartime experience ==
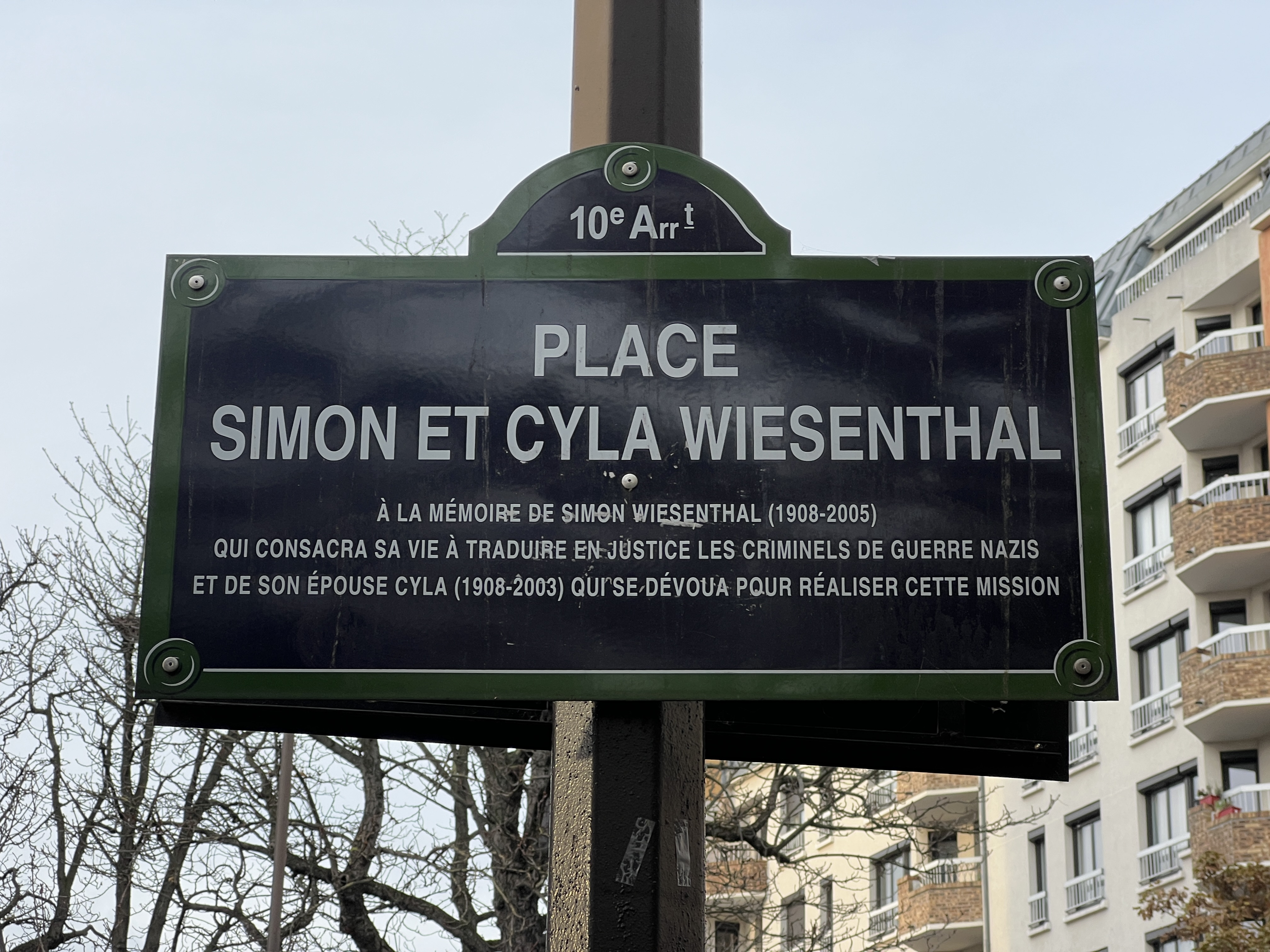
Simon and Cyla Wiesenthal square in Paris (2024)

Following the Molotov–Ribbentrop Pact in 1939, Soviet authorities occupied Lvov. After the German invasion of the Soviet Union in 1941, the couple were forced into a ghetto and then into a labour camp working on the railways. In 1942 Simon Wiesenthal arranged for Cyla to escape with false papers under the name “Irena Kowalska,” assisted by the Polish underground.

She was taken to Lublin, where she lived under an assumed identity and worked informally as a nanny. After increased risks of arrest, Wiesenthal returned to Lviv to try and contact her husband. She succeeded and the underground arranged her move to Warsaw. There, she obtained work in an electrical factory. Cyla was later deported for forced labour to Solingen, Germany, under a Polish identity, which spared her deportation to an extermination camp. In April 1945 she was liberated by the British Army. Simon Wiesenthal was imprisoned at Mauthausen concentration camp and both believed the other to be dead by 1945. Between them, 89 of their relatives were killed during the Holocaust.

== Later life and death ==
The couple were reunited in late 1945 in Linz, Austria. Their only child, Pauline, was born in 1946. Cyla Wiesenthal lived in Vienna for the rest of her life, largely distancing herself from her husband's work. She died there on 10 November 2003 at the age of 95.

== In popular culture ==
Wiesenthal was portrayed by Dutch actress Renée Soutendijk in the 1989 biographical film Murderers Among Us: The Simon Wiesenthal Story.
