= Katie Carr =

English actress

- Born: 1973 (age 52–53); London, England
- Occupations: Model; actress
- Years active: 1996–present

Katie Carr (born 1973) is an English actress and model. She may be best known for her appearances in Dinotopia as Marion and in Heroes as Caitlin.

== Filmography ==
Year	Title	Role	Notes
1996	The Innocent Sleep	Alice	
1997	The Perfect Blue	Katie	
1997	Highlander	Claire Clairmont	1 episode: "The Modern Prometheus"
1997	The Odyssey	Nausicaa	TV films
1997	Kangaroo Palace	Linda	TV films
1997	Mrs Dalloway	Elizabeth Dalloway	
1998	A Rather English Marriage	Young Mary	TV film
2001	Dial 9 for Love	Laura	
2002	Dinotopia	Marion Waldo	TV miniseries
2004	Raising Helen	Caitlin	
2005	Four Corners of Suburbia	Fiona Musey	
2007	Heroes	Caitlin	6 episodes
2008	CSI: NY	Tina O'Donovan	1 episode: "Happily Never After"
2008	Larry the Lawnmower	singer	2 episodes
2011	Game Time: Tackling the Past	Sarah Tate	TV film
2013	A Perfect Man	Laura	
2017	Mirette	Cook	Short
