= Simon Wiesenthal =

Austrian Nazi hunter (1908–2005)

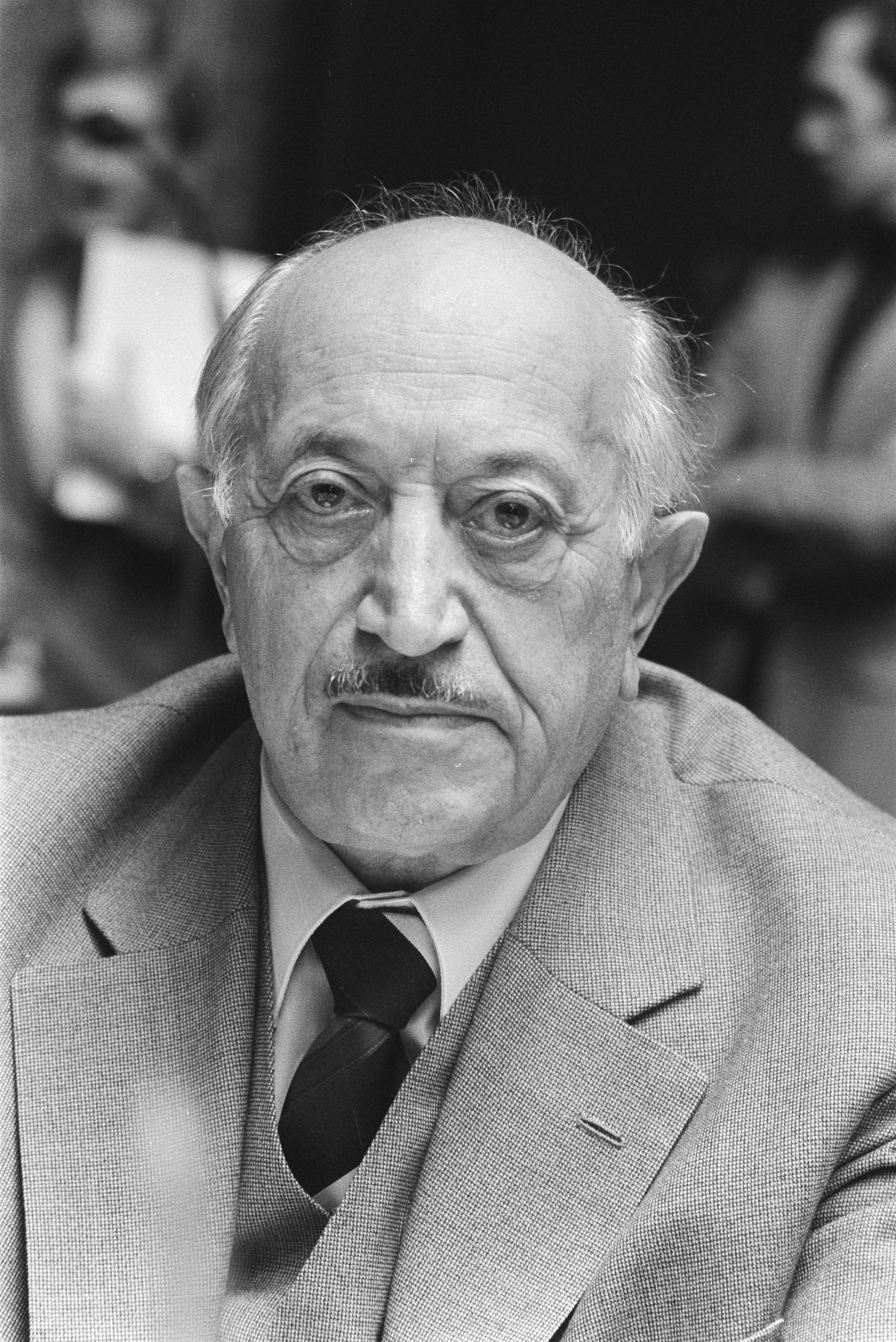
- Wiesenthal in 1982
- Born: 31 December 1908; Buchach, Austria-Hungary
- Died: 20 September 2005 (aged 96); Vienna, Austria
- Resting place: Herzliya, Israel
- Occupations: Nazi hunter; writer
- Known for: Simon Wiesenthal Center; Jewish Historical Documentation Centre; Vienna Wiesenthal Institute for Holocaust Studies
- Spouse: Cyla Müller (m. 1936; died 2003)
- Children: 1

Simon Wiesenthal (31 December 1908 – 20 September 2005) was an Austrian Holocaust survivor, Nazi hunter, and writer. He studied architecture, and was living in Lviv at the outbreak of World War II. He survived the Janowska concentration camp (late 1941 to September 1944), the Kraków-Płaszów concentration camp (September to October 1944), the Gross-Rosen concentration camp, a death march to Chemnitz, Buchenwald, and the Mauthausen concentration camp (February to May 1945).

After the war, Wiesenthal did not return to his original profession as an architect, instead dedicating his life to tracking down and gathering information on fugitive Nazi war criminals, so that they could be brought to trial. In 1947, he co-founded the Jewish Historical Documentation Centre in Linz, Austria, where he and others gathered information for future war crime trials and aided Jewish refugees in their search for lost relatives. In 1961, he resumed this activity in Vienna, where he opened the Documentation Centre of the Association of Jewish Victims of the Nazi Regime and continued to try locating missing Nazi war criminals. He may have played a small role in locating Adolf Eichmann who was captured by Mossad in Buenos Aires in 1960, and worked closely with the Austrian justice ministry to prepare a dossier on Franz Stangl, who was sentenced to life imprisonment in 1971. Wiesenthal conducted research full-time, funded by donations from private individuals as well as the Mossad, Israel's principal intelligence agency.

In the 1970s and 1980s, Wiesenthal was involved in two high-profile events involving Austrian politicians. Shortly after Bruno Kreisky was inaugurated as Austrian chancellor in April 1970, Wiesenthal pointed out to the press that four of his new cabinet appointees had been members of the Nazi Party. Kreisky, angry, called Wiesenthal a "Jewish fascist", likened his organisation to the Mafia, and accused him of collaborating with the Nazis. Wiesenthal successfully sued for libel, the suit ending in 1989. In 1986, Wiesenthal was involved in the case of Kurt Waldheim, whose service in the Wehrmacht and probable knowledge of the Holocaust were revealed in the lead-up to the 1986 Austrian presidential elections. Wiesenthal, embarrassed that he had previously cleared Waldheim of any wrongdoing, suffered negative publicity as a result of this event.

With a reputation as a storyteller, Wiesenthal was the author of several memoirs containing tales that are only loosely based on actual events. These contain large amounts of inconsistencies and exaggerations, in particular concerning his role in Eichmann's capture in 1960, and are therefore not considered to be reliable sources. Wiesenthal died in his sleep at age 96 in Vienna in 2005, and was buried in the city of Herzliya in Israel. The Simon Wiesenthal Center, headquartered in Los Angeles, is named in his honour.

== Early life ==
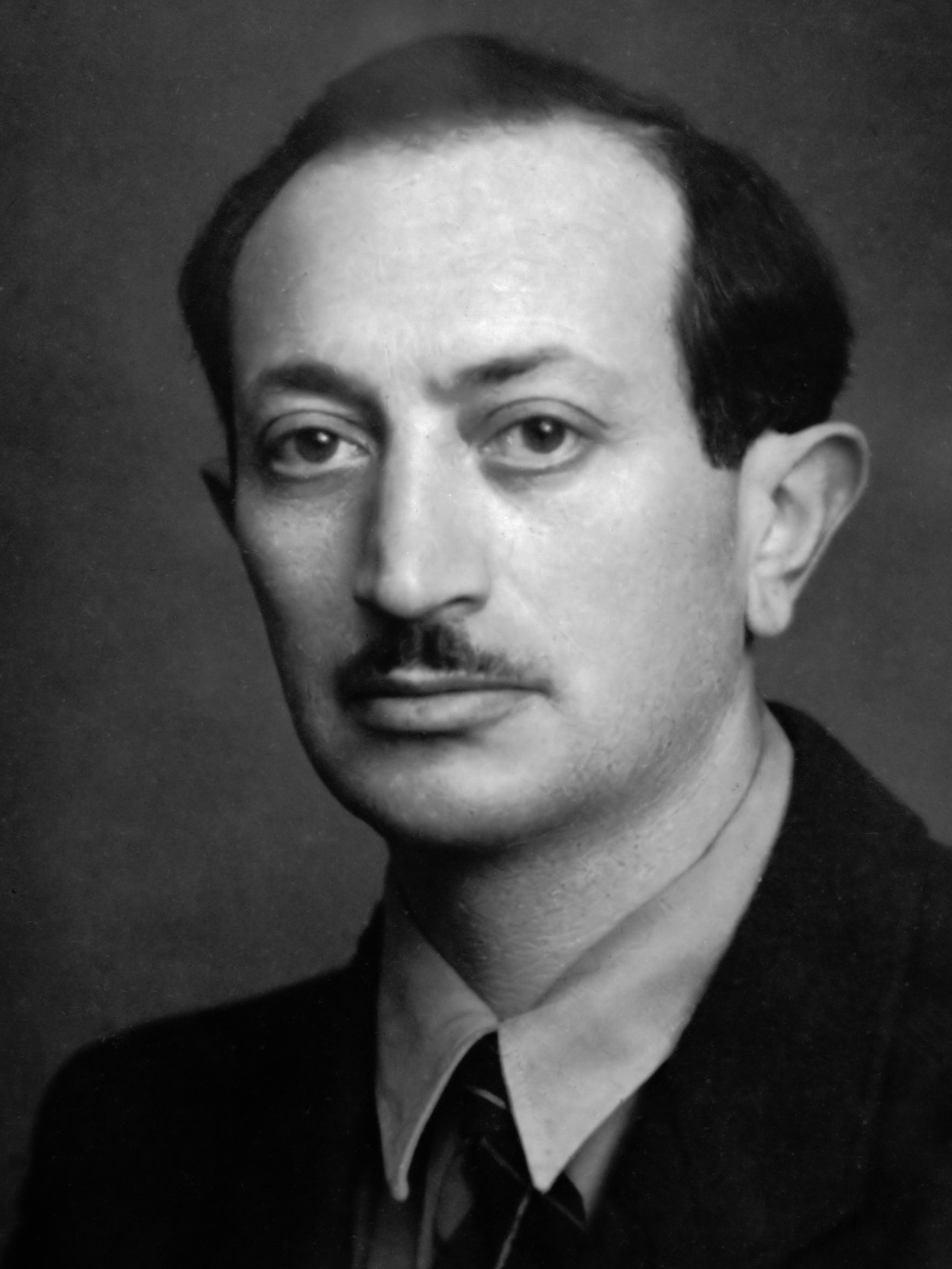
Wiesenthal (c. 1940–1945)

Wiesenthal was born on 31 December 1908, in Buczacz (Buchach), Kingdom of Galicia and Lodomeria, then part of Austria-Hungary, now Ternopil Oblast, in Ukraine. His father, Asher Wiesenthal, was a wholesaler who had emigrated from the Russian Empire in 1905 to escape the frequent pogroms against Jews. A reservist in the Austro-Hungarian Army, Asher was called to active duty in 1914 at the start of World War I. He died in combat on the Eastern Front in 1915. The remainder of the family—Simon, his younger brother Hillel, and his mother Rosa—fled to Vienna as the Russian army took control of Galicia. The two boys attended a German-language Jewish school. The family returned to Buczacz in 1917 after the Russians retreated. The area changed hands several more times before the war ended in November 1918.

Wiesenthal and Hillel attended high school at the Humanistic Gymnasium in Buchach, where classes were taught in Polish. There Simon met his future wife, Cyla Müller, whom he would marry in 1936. Hillel fell and broke his back in 1923 and died the following year. Rosa remarried in 1926 and moved to Dolyna with her new husband, Isack Halperin, who owned a tile factory there. Wiesenthal remained in Buczacz, living with the Müller family, until he graduated from high school—on his second attempt—in 1928.

With an interest in art and drawing, Wiesenthal chose to study architecture. His first choice was to attend the Lwów Polytechnic, but he was turned away because the school's Jewish quota had already been filled. He instead enrolled at the Czech Technical University in Prague, where he studied from 1928 until 1932. He was apprenticed as a building engineer through 1934 and 1935, spending most of that period in Odessa. He married Cyla in 1936 when he returned to Galicia.

Sources give differing reports of what happened next. Wiesenthal's autobiographies contradict each other on many points; he also over-dramatised and mythologised events. One version has Wiesenthal opening an architectural office and finally being admitted to the Lwów Polytechnic for an advanced degree. He designed a tuberculosis sanatorium and some residential buildings during the course of his studies and was active in a student Zionist organisation. He wrote for the Omnibus, a satirical student newspaper, and graduated in 1939. Author Guy Walters states that Wiesenthal's earliest autobiography does not mention studies at Lwów. Walters quotes a curriculum vitae Wiesenthal prepared after World War II as stating he worked as a supervisor at a factory until 1939 and then worked as a mechanic in a different factory until the Nazis invaded in 1941. Wiesenthal's 1961 book Ich jagte Eichmann (I chased Eichmann) states that he worked in Odessa as an engineer from 1940 to 1941. Walters says that there is no record of Wiesenthal attending the university at Lwów, and that he does not appear in the Katalog Architektów i Budowniczych (Catalogue of Architects and Builders) for the appropriate period.

== World War II ==
In Europe, World War II began in September 1939 with the invasion of Poland by Germany and the Soviet Union. As a result of the subsequent partitioning of Poland under the Molotov–Ribbentrop Pact, the city of Lwów was annexed by the Soviets and became known as Lvov in Russian or Lviv in Ukrainian. Wiesenthal's stepfather, still living in Dolyna, was arrested as a capitalist; he later died in a Soviet prison. Wiesenthal's mother moved to Lvov to live with Wiesenthal and Cyla. Wiesenthal bribed an official to prevent his own deportation under Clause 11, a rule that prevented all Jewish professionals and intellectuals from living within 100 kilometres (62 mi) of the city, which was under Soviet rule until the Germans invaded in June 1941.

By mid-July Wiesenthal and other Jewish residents had to register to do forced labour. Within six months, in November 1941 the Nazis had set up the Lwów Ghetto using Jewish forced labour. All Jews had to give up their homes and move there, a process completed in the following months. Several thousand Jews were murdered in Lvov by Ukrainian nationals and German Einsatzgruppen in June and July 1941. In his autobiographies, Wiesenthal tells how he was arrested on 6 July, but saved from execution by his former foreman, a man surnamed Bodnar, who was now a member of the Ukrainian Auxiliary Police. There are several versions of the story, which may be apocryphal.

In late 1941, Wiesenthal and his wife were transferred to Janowska concentration camp and forced to work at the Eastern Railway Repair Works. He painted swastikas and other inscriptions on captured Soviet railway engines, and Cyla was put to work polishing the brass and nickel. In exchange for providing details about the railways, Wiesenthal obtained false identity papers for his wife from a member of the Armia Krajowa, a Polish underground organisation. She travelled to Warsaw, where she was put to work in a German radio factory. She spent time in two labour camps as well. Conditions were harsh and her health was permanently damaged, but she survived the war. The couple was reunited in 1945, and their daughter Paulinka was born the following year.

Every few weeks, the Nazis staged a roundup in the Lvov ghetto of people unable to work. These roundups typically took place while the able-bodied were absent doing forced labour. In one such deportation, Wiesenthal's mother and other elderly Jewish women were transported by freight train to Belzec extermination camp and murdered in August 1942. Around the same time, a Ukrainian policeman shot Cyla's mother to death on the front porch of her home in Buczacz while she was being evicted. Between Cyla and Simon Wiesenthal, 89 of their relatives were murdered during the Holocaust.

Forced labourers for the Eastern Railway were eventually kept in a separate closed camp, where conditions were a little better than at the main camp at Janowska. Wiesenthal prepared architectural drawings for Adolf Kohlrautz, the senior inspector, who submitted them under his own name. To obtain contracts, construction companies paid bribes to Kohlrautz, who shared some of the money with Wiesenthal. He was able to pass along further information about the railroads to the underground and occasionally left the compound to obtain supplies, even clandestinely obtaining weapons for the Armia Krajowa and two pistols for himself, which he brought with him when he escaped in late 1943.

According to Wiesenthal, on 20 April 1943, Second Lieutenant Gustav Wilhaus, second in command at the Janowska camp, decided to shoot 54 Jewish intellectuals in celebration of Hitler's 54th birthday. Unable to find enough such people still alive at Janowska, Wilhaus ordered a roundup of prisoners from the satellite camps. Wiesenthal and two other inmates were taken from the Eastern Railway camp to the execution site, a trench 6 feet (1.8 m) deep and 1,500 feet (460 m) long at a nearby sandpit. The men were stripped and led through "the Hose", a six- or seven-foot wide barbed wire corridor to the execution ground. The victims were shot and their bodies allowed to fall into the pit. Wiesenthal, waiting to be shot, heard someone call out his name. He was returned alive to the camp; Kohlrautz had convinced his superiors that Wiesenthal was the best man available to paint a giant poster in honour of Hitler's birthday.

On 2 October 1943, according to Wiesenthal, Kohlrautz warned him that the camp and its prisoners were about to be liquidated. Kohlrautz gave Wiesenthal and fellow prisoner Arthur Scheiman passes to go to town, accompanied by a Ukrainian guard, to buy stationery. The two men escaped out the back of the shop while their guard waited at the front counter.

Wiesenthal did not mention either of these events—or Kohlrautz's part in them—when testifying to American investigators in May 1945, or in an affidavit he made in August 1954 about his wartime persecutions, and researcher Guy Walters questions their authenticity. Wiesenthal variously reported that Kohlrautz was killed on the Soviet Front in 1944 or in the Battle of Berlin on 19 April 1945.

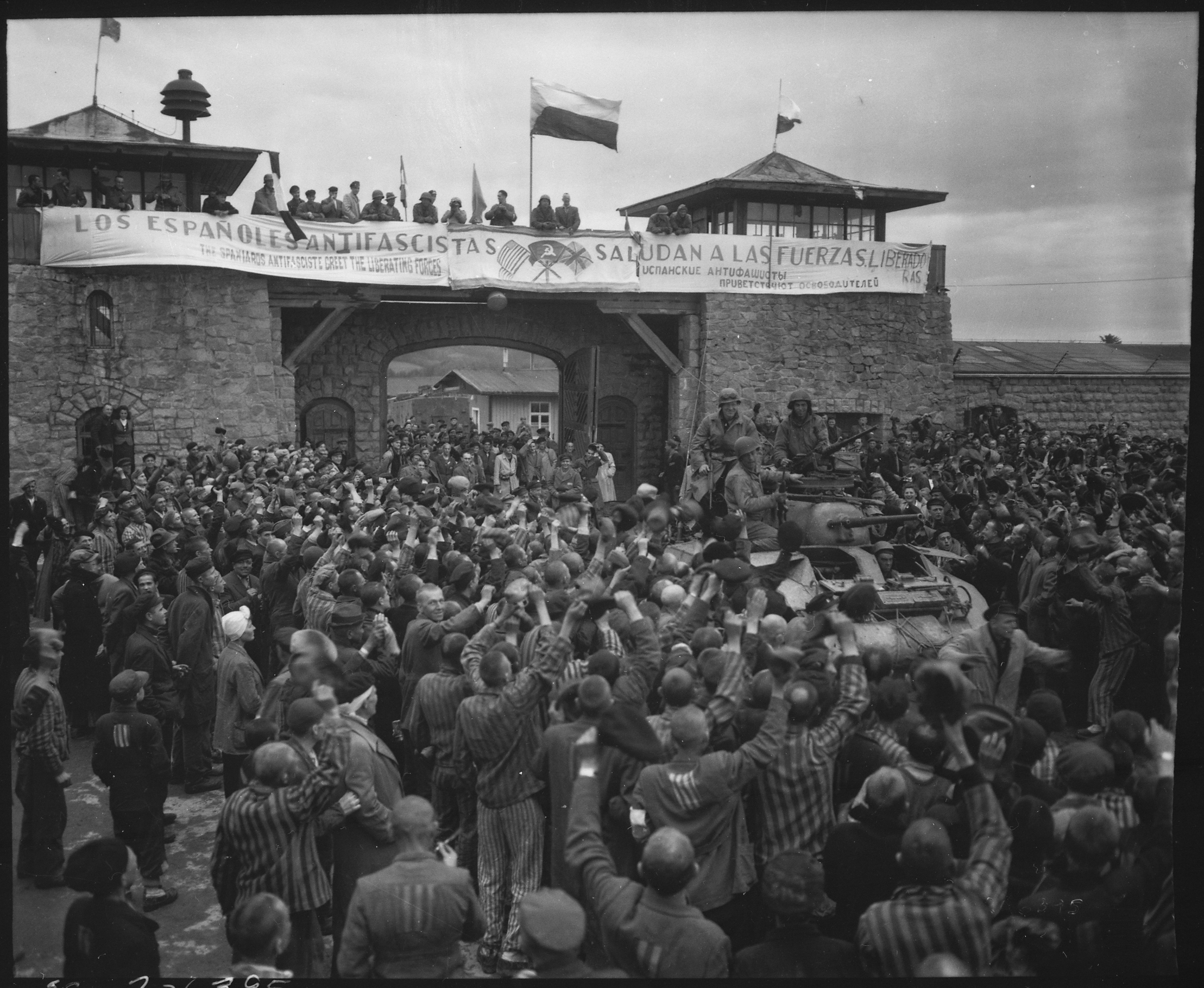
Prisoners at Mauthausen greet American forces, May 1945.

After several days in hiding, Scheiman rejoined his wife, and Wiesenthal was taken by members of the underground to the nearby village of Kulparkow, where he remained until the end of 1943. Soon afterwards the Janowska camp was liquidated; this made it unsafe to hide in the nearby countryside, so Wiesenthal returned to Lvov, where he spent three days hiding in a closet at the Scheimans' apartment. He then moved to the apartment of Paulina Busch, for whom he had previously forged an identity card. He was found by two Polish policemen and an SS man there, hiding under the floorboards, on 13 June 1944 and taken back to the remains of the camp at Janowska. Wiesenthal attempted suicide to avoid being interrogated about his connections with the underground. In the end there was no time for interrogations, as Soviet forces were advancing into the area. SS-Hauptsturmführer Friedrich Warzok, the new camp commandant, rounded up the remaining prisoners and transported them to Przemyśl, 97 kilometres (60 mi) west of Lvov, where he put them to work building fortifications. By September Warzok and his men were reassigned to the front, and Wiesenthal and the other surviving captives were sent to the Kraków-Płaszów concentration camp.

By October the inmates were evacuated to Gross-Rosen concentration camp, where inmates were suffering from severe overcrowding and a shortage of food. Wiesenthal's big toe on his right foot had to be amputated after a rock fell on it while he was working in the quarry. He was still ill in January when the advancing Soviets forced yet another evacuation, this time on foot, to Chemnitz. Using a broom handle for a walking stick, he was one of the few who survived the march. From Chemnitz, the prisoners were taken in open freight cars to Buchenwald, and a few days later by truck to Mauthausen concentration camp, arriving in mid-February 1945. Over half the prisoners did not survive the journey. Wiesenthal was placed in a death block for the mortally ill, where he survived on 200 calories a day until the camp was liberated by the Americans on 5 May 1945. He weighed 41 kilograms (90 lb) when he was liberated.

== Nazi hunter ==
Within three weeks of the liberation of Mauthausen, Wiesenthal had prepared a list of around a hundred names of suspected Nazi war criminals—mostly guards, camp commandants, and members of the Gestapo—and presented it to a War Crimes office of the American Counterintelligence Corps at Mauthausen. He worked as an interpreter, accompanying officers who were carrying out arrests, though he was still very frail. When Austria was partitioned in July 1945, Mauthausen fell into the Soviet-occupied zone, so the American War Crimes Office was moved to Linz. Wiesenthal went with them, and was housed in a displaced persons camp. He served as vice-chairman of the area's Jewish Central Committee, an organisation that attempted to arrange basic care for Jewish refugees and tried to help people gather information about their missing family members.

Wiesenthal worked for the American Office of Strategic Services for a year, and continued to collect information on both victims and perpetrators of the Holocaust. He assisted the Bricha, an underground organisation that smuggled Jewish survivors into the British Mandate for Palestine. Wiesenthal helped arrange for forged papers, food supplies, transportation, and so on. In February 1947, he and 30 other volunteers founded the Jewish Documentation Center in Linz to gather information for future war crimes trials. They collected 3,289 depositions from concentration camp survivors still living in Europe. However, as the US and the Soviet Union lost interest in conducting further trials, a similar group headed by Tuviah Friedman in Vienna closed its office in 1952, and Wiesenthal's closed in 1954. Almost all of the documentation collected at both centres was forwarded to the Yad Vashem archives in Israel. Wiesenthal, employed full-time by two Jewish welfare agencies, continued his work with refugees. As it became clear that the former Allies were no longer interested in pursuing the work of bringing Nazi war criminals to justice, Wiesenthal persisted, believing the survivors were obliged to take on the task. His work became a way to memorialise and remember all the people that had been lost. Wiesenthal conducted research full-time, funded by donations from private individuals as well as Mossad. He told biographer Alan Levy in 1974:

When the Germans first came to my city in Galicia, half the population was Jewish: one hundred fifty thousand Jews. When the Germans were gone, five hundred were alive. ... Many times I was thinking that everything in life has a price, so to stay alive must also have a price. And my price was always that, if I lived, I must be deputy for many people who are not alive.

=== Adolf Eichmann ===
Though most of the Jews still alive in Linz had emigrated after the war, Wiesenthal decided to stay on, partly because the family of Adolf Eichmann lived a few blocks away from him. Eichmann had been in charge of the transportation and deportation of Jews in the Nazi Final Solution to the Jewish Question: a plan to exterminate all the Jews in Europe, finalised at the Wannsee Conference, at which Eichmann took the minutes. After the war, Eichmann hid in Austria using forged identity papers until 1950, when he left via Italy, and moved to Argentina under an assumed name. Hoping to obtain information on Eichmann's whereabouts, Wiesenthal continuously monitored the remaining members of the immediate family in Linz until they vanished in 1952.

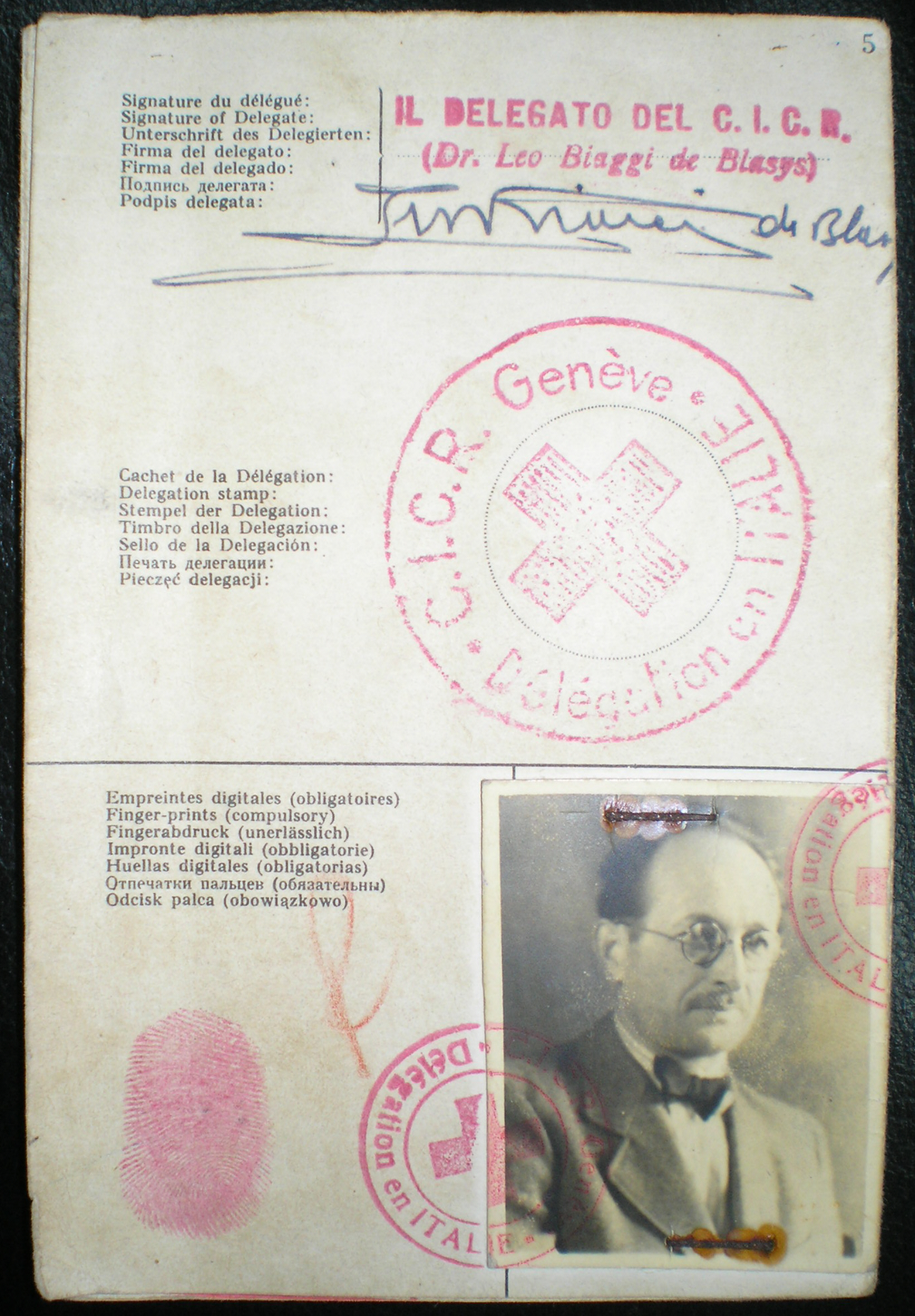
Document under the name of Ricardo Klement that Adolf Eichmann used to enter Argentina in 1950

Wiesenthal learned from a letter shown to him in 1953 that Eichmann had been seen in Buenos Aires, and he passed along that information to the Israeli consulate in Vienna in 1954. Fritz Bauer, prosecutor-general of the state of Hesse in West Germany, received independent confirmation of Eichmann's whereabouts in 1957, but German agents were unable to find him until late 1959. When Eichmann's father died in 1960, Wiesenthal made arrangements for private detectives to surreptitiously photograph members of the family, as Otto Eichmann was said to bear a strong resemblance to his brother Adolf, and there were no current photos of the fugitive. He provided these photographs to Mossad agents on 18 February. Zvi Aharoni, one of the Mossad agents responsible for Eichmann's capture in Buenos Aires on 11 May 1960, said the photos were useful in confirming Eichmann's identity. On 23 May, Israeli Prime Minister David Ben-Gurion announced Eichmann was under arrest and in Israel. The next day Wiesenthal, while he was being interviewed by reporters, received a congratulatory telegram from Yad Vashem. He immediately became a minor celebrity, and began work on a book about his experiences. Ich jagte Eichmann: Tatsachenbericht (I chased Eichmann: A true story) was published six weeks before the trial opened in spring 1961. Wiesenthal helped the prosecution prepare their case and attended a portion of the trial. Eichmann was sentenced to death and was hanged on 1 June 1962.

Meanwhile, both of Wiesenthal's employers terminated his services in 1960, as there were too few refugees left in the city to justify the expense. Wiesenthal opened a new documentation centre (the Documentation Centre of the Association of Jewish Victims of the Nazi Regime) in Vienna in 1961. He became a Mossad operative, for which he received the equivalent of several hundred dollars per month. He maintained files on hundreds of suspected Nazi war criminals and located many, about six of whom were arrested as a result of his activities. Successes included locating and bringing to trial Erich Rajakowitsch, responsible for the deportation of Jews from the Netherlands, and Franz Murer, the commandant of the Vilna Ghetto. In 1963 Wiesenthal read in the newspaper that Karl Silberbauer, the man who had arrested famed diarist Anne Frank, had been located; he was serving on the police force in Vienna. Wiesenthal's publicity campaign led to Silberbauer being temporarily suspended from the force, but he was never prosecuted for arresting the Frank family.

Despite Wiesenthal's protests, in late 1963 his centre in Vienna was taken over by a local community group, so he immediately set up a new independent office, funded using donations and his stipend from the Mossad. As the 20-year statute of limitations for German war crimes was about to expire, Wiesenthal began lobbying to have it extended or removed entirely. In March 1965 the Bundestag deferred the matter for five years, effectively extending the expiration date. Similar action was taken by the Austrian government. But as time went on, it became more difficult to obtain prosecutions. Witnesses grew older and were less likely to be able to offer valuable testimony. Funding for trials was inadequate, as the governments of Austria and Germany became less interested in obtaining convictions for wartime events, preferring to forget the Nazi past.

=== Franz Stangl ===
Franz Stangl was a supervisor at the Hartheim Euthanasia Centre, part of Action T4, an early Nazi euthanasia programme that was responsible for the deaths of over 70,000 mentally ill or physically deformed people in Germany. In February 1942, he was commander at the Sobibor extermination camp and in August of the same year he was transferred to Treblinka. During his time at these camps, he oversaw the deaths of nearly 900,000 people. While under US detention for two years, he remained unidentified as a war criminal because so few witnesses had survived Sobibor and Treblinka that authorities never realised who he was. He escaped while on a roadwork detail in Linz in May 1948. After he made his way to Rome, the Caritas relief agency provided him with a Red Cross passport and a boat ticket to Syria. His family joined him there a year later and they emigrated to Brazil in 1951.

It was probably Stangl's former son-in-law who informed Wiesenthal of Stangl's whereabouts in 1964. Concerned that Stangl would be warned and escape, Wiesenthal quietly prepared a dossier with the assistance of Austrian Minister of Justice Hans Klecatsky. Stangl was arrested outside his home in São Paulo on 28 February 1967 and was extradited to Germany on 22 June. A month later Wiesenthal's book The Murderers Among Us was released. Wiesenthal's publishers advertised that he had been responsible for locating over 800 Nazis, a claim that had no basis in fact but was nonetheless repeated by reputable newspapers such as the New York Times. Stangl was sentenced to life in prison and died of heart failure in June 1971, having confessed his guilt to biographer Gitta Sereny the previous day.

=== Hermine Braunsteiner ===
Known as "the Mare of Majdanek", Hermine Braunsteiner was a guard who served at Majdanek and Ravensbrück concentration camps. A cruel and sadistic woman, she earned her nickname for her propensity to kick her victims to death. She served a three-year sentence in Austria for her activities in Ravensbrück, but had not yet been charged for any of her crimes at Majdanek when she emigrated to the United States in 1959. She became an American citizen in 1963.

Wiesenthal was first told about Braunsteiner in early 1964 via a chance encounter in Tel Aviv with someone who had seen her performing selections at Majdanek—deciding who was to be assigned to slave labour and who was to be murdered immediately in the gas chambers. When he returned to Vienna he had an operative visit one of her relatives to clandestinely collect information. Wiesenthal soon traced Braunsteiner's whereabouts to Queens, New York, so he notified the Israeli police and the New York Times. Despite Wiesenthal's efforts to expedite the matter, Braunsteiner was not extradited to Germany until 1973. Her trial was part of a joint indictment with nine other defendants accused of killing 250,000 people at Majdanek. She was sentenced to life imprisonment in 1981, was released on health grounds in 1996, and died in 1999.

=== Josef Mengele ===
Josef Mengele was a medical officer assigned to Auschwitz concentration camp from 1943 until the end of the war. As well as performing most of the selections of inmates as they arrived by train from all over Europe, he performed unscientific and usually deadly experiments on the inmates. He left the camp in January 1945 as the Red Army approached and was briefly in American custody in Weiden in der Oberpfalz, but was released. He took work as a farmhand in rural Germany, remaining until 1949, when he decided to flee the country. He acquired a Red Cross passport and left for Argentina, setting up a business in Buenos Aires in 1951. Acting on information received from Wiesenthal, West German authorities tried to extradite Mengele in 1960, but he could not be found; he had in fact moved to Paraguay in 1958. He moved to Brazil in 1961 and lived there until he drowned while swimming in 1979.

Wiesenthal claimed to have information that placed Mengele in several locations: on the Greek island of Kythnos in 1960, Cairo in 1961, in Spain in 1971, and in Paraguay in 1978, the latter 18 years after he had left. In 1982, he offered a reward of $100,000 for Mengele's capture and insisted as late as 1985—six years after Mengele's death—that he was still alive. The Mengele family admitted to authorities in 1985 that he had died in 1979; the body was exhumed and its identity was confirmed. Earlier that year Wiesenthal had served as one of the judges at a mock trial of Mengele, held in Jerusalem.

=== Simon Wiesenthal Centre ===
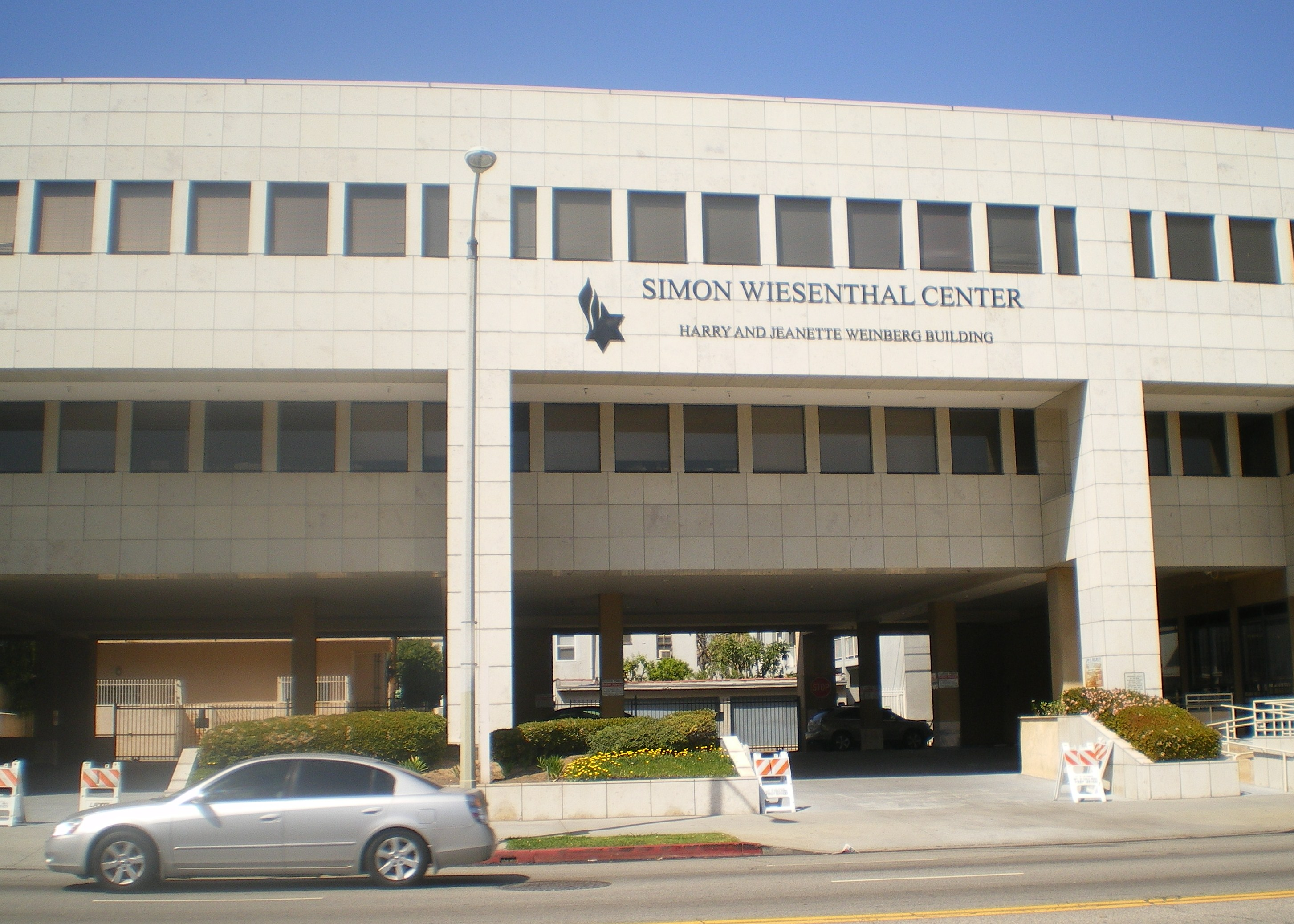
Simon Wiesenthal Centre in Los Angeles

The Simon Wiesenthal Centre in Los Angeles was founded in 1977 by Rabbi Marvin Hier, who paid Wiesenthal an honorarium for the right to use his name. The centre helped with the campaign to remove the statute of limitations on Nazi crimes and continues the hunt for suspected Nazi war criminals, but today its primary activities include Holocaust remembrance, education, and fighting antisemitism. Wiesenthal was not always happy with the way the centre was run. He thought the centre's Holocaust museum was not dignified enough and that he should have a larger say in the overall operations. He even wrote to the board of directors requesting Hier's removal, but in the end had to be content with being a figurehead.

== Later life ==
=== Austrian politics ===
==== Bruno Kreisky ====
Shortly after Bruno Kreisky was inaugurated as Austrian chancellor in April 1970, Wiesenthal pointed out to the press that four of his new cabinet appointees had been members of the Nazi Party. In an address in June, Kreisky's Minister of Education and Culture Leopold Gratz characterised Wiesenthal's Documentation Centre of the Association of Jewish Victims of the Nazi Regime as a private spy ring, invading the privacy of innocent parties. In an interview a week later, Kreisky (who was himself Jewish) described Wiesenthal as a "Jewish fascist", a remark he later denied making. Wiesenthal discovered that he would be unable to sue, because under Austrian law Kreisky was protected by parliamentary immunity.

When his re-election in 1975 seemed unsure, Kreisky proposed that his Social Democratic Party should form a coalition with the Freedom Party, headed by Friedrich Peter. Wiesenthal had documents proving that Peter had been a member of the 1st SS Infantry Brigade, a unit that had exterminated over 13,000 Jewish civilians in occupied Ukraine in 1941–42. He decided not to reveal this information to the press until after the election, but forwarded his dossier to President Rudolf Kirchschläger. Peter denied having participated in, or having knowledge of, any atrocities. In the end, Kreisky's party won a clear majority and did not form the coalition.

In a press conference a short time after the election and Wiesenthal's revelations, Kreisky said Wiesenthal used "the methods of a quasi-political Mafia." Wiesenthal filed a libel lawsuit (although Kreisky had the power to declare immunity if he so chose), and when Kreisky later accused Wiesenthal of being an agent of the Gestapo, working with the Judenrat in Lvov, these accusations were incorporated into the lawsuit as well. The suit was decided in Wiesenthal's favour in 1989, but after Kreisky's death nine months later his heirs refused to pay. When the relevant archives were later opened for research, no evidence was found that Wiesenthal had been a collaborator.

==== Kurt Waldheim ====
When Kurt Waldheim was named secretary-general of the United Nations in 1971, Wiesenthal reported—without checking very thoroughly—that there was no evidence that he had a Nazi past. This analysis had been supported by the opinions of the American Counterintelligence Corps and Office of Strategic Services when they examined his records right after the war. However, Waldheim's 1985 autobiography did not include his war service following his recuperation from a 1941 injury. When he returned to active duty in 1942, he was posted to Yugoslavia and Greece, and had knowledge of murders of civilians that took place in those locations during his service there. The Austrian news magazine Profil published a story in March 1986—during his campaign for the presidency of Austria—that Waldheim had been a member of the Sturmabteilung (SA). The New York Times soon reported that Waldheim had failed to reveal all of the facts about his war service. Wiesenthal, embarrassed, attempted to help Waldheim defend himself. The World Jewish Congress investigated the issue, but the Israeli attorney general concluded that their material was insufficient evidence for a conviction. Waldheim was elected president in July 1986. A panel of historians tasked with investigating the case issued a report eighteen months later. They concluded that, while there was no evidence that Waldheim had committed atrocities, he must have known they were occurring, yet did nothing. Wiesenthal unsuccessfully demanded that Waldheim resign. The World Jewish Congress successfully lobbied to have Waldheim barred from entering the United States.

=== Sails of Hope ===
In 1968, Wiesenthal published Zeilen der hoop. De geheime missie van Christoffel Columbus (translated in 1972 as Sails of Hope: The Secret Mission of Christopher Columbus), which was his first non-fiction book not on the subject of the Holocaust. In the book, Wiesenthal put forward his theory that Christopher Columbus was a Sephardi Jew from Spain who practised his religion in secret to avoid persecution. (The consensus of most historians is that Columbus came from the Republic of Genoa, on the northwestern coast of present-day Italy.) Wiesenthal argued that the quest for the New World was not motivated by wealth or fame, but rather by Columbus's desire to find a place of refuge for the Jews, who were suffering immense persecution in Spain at the time (and in 1492 would be subjected to the Edict of Expulsion). Wiesenthal also believed that Columbus's concept of "sailing west" was based on Biblical prophecies (certain verses in the Book of Isaiah) rather than any prior geographical knowledge.

=== Awards and nominations ===
Wiesenthal was nominated for the Nobel Peace Prize in 1985, the 40th anniversary of the end of the war. Rumour had it that the Nobel Committee would give the prize to a Holocaust-related candidate. Fellow Holocaust survivor and author Elie Wiesel, also nominated, began a campaign in hopes of winning the prize, travelling to France, Ethiopia and Oslo for speaking tours and humanitarian work. Rabbi Hier of the Wiesenthal Centre urged Wiesenthal to lobby for the prize as well, but other than delivering a lecture in Oslo, Wiesenthal did little to promote his candidacy. When Wiesel was awarded the 1986 prize, Wiesenthal claimed the World Jewish Congress must have influenced the committee's decision, a claim the WJC denied. Biographer Tom Segev speculates that the loss may have been because of the negative publicity over the Waldheim affair.

In 1992, Wiesenthal was awarded the Erasmus Prize by the Praemium Erasmianum Foundation.

In 2004, he was awarded an honorary KBE by the British Government.

=== Retirement and death ===
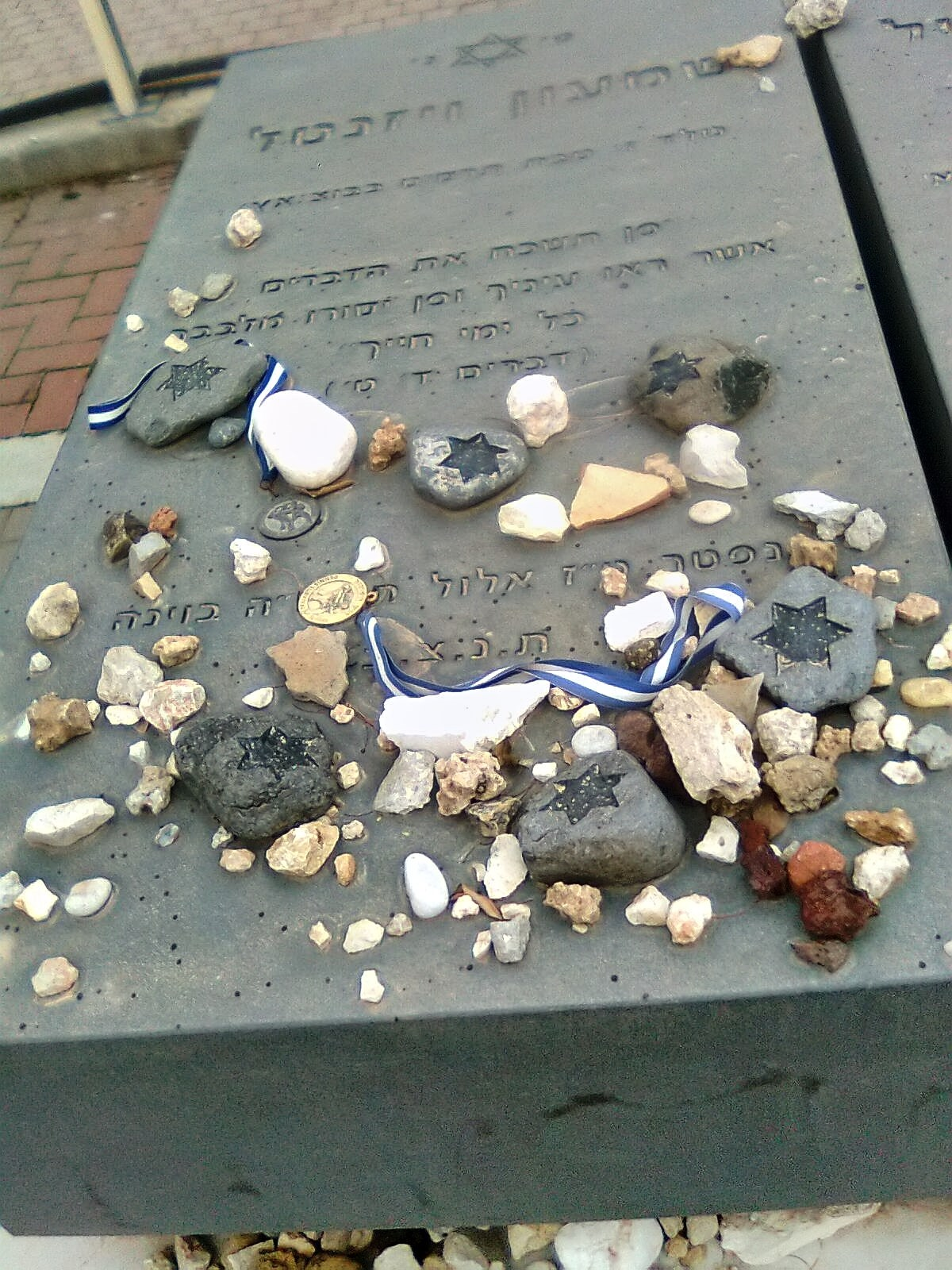
Wiesenthal's grave in Herzliya, Israel

Wiesenthal received many death threats over the years. After a bomb placed by neo-Nazis exploded outside his house in Vienna on 11 June 1982, police guards were stationed outside his home 24 hours a day. Cyla found the stressful nature of her husband's career and the dragged-out legal matters regarding Kreisky to be overwhelming, and she sometimes suffered from depression.

Wiesenthal spent time at his office at the Documentation Centre of the Association of Jewish Victims of the Nazi Regime in Vienna even as he approached his 90th birthday. He finally retired in October 2001, when he was 92. The last Nazi he had a hand in bringing to trial was Untersturmführer Julius Viel, who was convicted in 2001 of shooting seven Jewish prisoners. "I have survived them all. If there were any left, they'd be too old and weak to stand trial today. My work is done," said Wiesenthal. Cyla died on 10 November 2003, at age 95, and Wiesenthal died on 20 September 2005, age 96. He was buried in Herzliya, Israel.

In a statement on Wiesenthal's death, Council of Europe chairman Terry Davis said, "Without Simon Wiesenthal's relentless effort to find Nazi criminals and bring them to justice, and to fight anti-Semitism and prejudice, Europe would never have succeeded in healing its wounds and reconciling itself. He was a soldier of justice, which is indispensable to our freedom, stability and peace."

In 2010, the Austrian and Israeli governments jointly issued a commemorative stamp honouring Wiesenthal. Wiesenthal became an avid stamp collector after the war, following advice from his doctors to take up a hobby to help him relax. In 2006, his collection of Zemstvo stamps sold at auction for €90,000 after his death.

== Dramatic portrayals ==
Wiesenthal was portrayed by Israeli actor Shmuel Rodensky in the film adaptation of Frederick Forsyth's The Odessa File (1974). After the film's release, Wiesenthal received many reports of sightings of the subject of the film, Eduard Roschmann, commandant of the Riga Ghetto. These sightings proved to be false alarms, but in 1977 a person living in Buenos Aires who saw the movie reported to police that Roschmann was living nearby. The fugitive escaped to Paraguay, where he died of a heart attack a month later. In Ira Levin's novel The Boys from Brazil, the character of Yakov Liebermann (called Ezra Liebermann and played by Laurence Olivier in the film) is modelled on Wiesenthal. Olivier visited Wiesenthal, who offered advice on how to play the role. Wiesenthal attended the film's New York premiere in 1978. Ben Kingsley portrayed him in the HBO film Murderers Among Us: The Simon Wiesenthal Story (1989). Judd Hirsch portrayed him in the Amazon Prime Video series Hunters (2020).

Wiesenthal has been the subject of several documentaries. The Art of Remembrance: Simon Wiesenthal was produced in 1994 by filmmakers Johanna Heer and Werner Schmiedel for River Lights Pictures. The documentary I Have Never Forgotten You: The Life and Legacy of Simon Wiesenthal, narrated by Nicole Kidman, was released by Moriah Films in 2007. Wiesenthal is a one-person show written and performed by Tom Dugan that premiered in 2014.

== Autobiographical inconsistencies ==
A number of Wiesenthal's books contain conflicting stories and tales, many of which were invented. Several authors, including Segev and British author Guy Walters, feel that Wiesenthal's autobiographies are not reliable sources of information about his life and activities. For example, Wiesenthal would describe two people fighting over one of the lists he had prepared of survivors of the Holocaust; the two look up and recognise each other and have a tearful reunion. In one account it is a husband and wife, and in another telling it is two brothers. Wiesenthal's memoirs variously claim he had spent time in as many as eleven concentration camps; the actual number was five. A drawing he made in 1945 that he claimed was a scene he witnessed in Mauthausen had actually been sketched from photos that appeared in Life magazine that June. He particularly over-emphasised his role in the capture of Eichmann, claiming that he prevented Veronika Eichmann from having her husband declared dead in 1947, when in fact the declaration was denied by government officials. Wiesenthal said that he had retained his Eichmann file when he sent his research materials to Yad Vashem in 1952; in fact he sent all his materials there, and it was his counterpart, Tuviah Friedman in Vienna, who had retained materials on Eichmann. Isser Harel, director of the Mossad at the time, has stated that Wiesenthal had no role in the capture of Eichmann.

Walters and Segev both noted inconsistencies between Wiesenthal's stories and his actual achievements. Segev concluded that Wiesenthal lied because of his storytelling nature and survivor guilt. Daniel Finkelstein described Walters's research in Hunting Evil as impeccable and quoted Ben Barkow: "Accepting that Wiesenthal was a showman and a braggart and, yes, even a liar, can live alongside acknowledging the contribution he made".

In 1979, Wiesenthal told The Washington Post: "I have sought with Jewish leaders not to talk about 6 million Jewish dead [in the Holocaust], but rather about 11 million civilians dead, including 6 million Jews." In a 2017 interview, Yehuda Bauer said that he had told Wiesenthal not to use this figure. "I said to him, 'Simon, you are telling a lie,' ... [Wiesenthal replied] 'Sometimes you need to do that to get the results for things you think are essential.'" According to Bauer and other historians, Wiesenthal chose the figure of 5 million non-Jewish victims because it was just lower than the six million Jews who were murdered, but high enough to attract sympathy from non-Jews. The figure of eleven million Nazi victims became popular and was referred to by President Jimmy Carter in the executive order establishing the United States Holocaust Memorial Museum.

== List of books and journal articles ==
=== Books ===
- Ich jagte Eichmann. Tatsachenbericht (I chased Eichmann. A true story). S. Mohn, Gütersloh (1961)
- Writing under the pen name Mischka Kukin, Wiesenthal published Humor hinter dem Eisernen Vorhang ("Humor Behind the Iron Curtain"). Gütersloh: Signum-Verlag (1962)
- The Murderers Among Us: The Simon Wiesenthal Memoirs. New York: McGraw-Hill (1967)
- Zeilen der hoop. De geheime missie van Christoffel Columbus. Amsterdam: H. J. W. Becht (1968). Translated as Sails of Hope: The Secret Mission of Christopher Columbus. New York: Macmillan (1972)
- "Mauthausen: Steps beyond the Grave". In Hunter and Hunted: Human History of the Holocaust. Gerd Korman, editor. New York: Viking Press (1973). pp. 286–295.
- The Sunflower: On the Possibilities and Limits of Forgiveness New York: Schocken Books (1969)
- Max and Helen: A Remarkable True Love Story. New York: Morrow (1982)
- Every Day Remembrance Day: A Chronicle of Jewish Martyrdom. New York: Henry Holt (1987)
- Justice, Not Vengeance. New York: Grove-Weidenfeld (1989)

=== Journal articles ===
- "Latvian War Criminals in USA". Jewish Currents 20, no. 7 (July/August 1966): 4–8. Also in 20, no. 10 (November 1966): 24.
- "There Are Still Murderers Among Us". National Jewish Monthly 82, no. 2 (October 1967): 8–9.
- "Nazi Criminals in Arab States". In Israel Horizons 15, no. 7 (September 1967): 10–12.
- Anti-Jewish Agitation in Poland: (Prewar Fascists and Nazi Collaborators in Unity of Action with Antisemites from the Ranks of the Polish Communist Party): A Documentary Report. Bonn: R. Vogel (1969)
- "Justice: Why I Hunt Nazis". In Jewish Observer and Middle East Review 21, no. 12 (24 March 1972): 16.

== See also ==
- Vienna Wiesenthal Institute for Holocaust Studies
- List of awards received by Simon Wiesenthal
- Beate Klarsfeld
- Serge Klarsfeld
- Yaron Svoray
- Efraim Zuroff

== Bibliography ==
- Evans, Richard J. (2008). The Third Reich at War. New York: Penguin Group. ISBN 978-0-14-311671-4.
- Finkelstein, David (20 August 2009). "It is right to expose Wiesenthal". The Jewish Chronicle.
- Friedmann, Jan (5 September 2010). "»Überlebensgroßes Ego«". Der Spiegel (in German).
- Garner, Dwight (2 September 2010). "Simon Wiesenthal, the Man Who Refused to Forget". New York Times.
- Hawson, Fred (29 August 2020). "Amazon Prime review: Al Pacino leads 'Hunters' against Nazis in polarizing series". ABS-CBN News.
- Kampeas, Ron (31 January 2017). "'Remember the 11 million'? Why an inflated victims tally irks Holocaust historians". Jewish Telegraphic Agency.
- Kandell, Jonathan (11 February 2010). "Postage Pays For Norwegian Philatelist". Institutional Investor.
- Leidig, Michael (7 October 2001). "The hunt is over, says Wiesenthal as he retires". The Telegraph. Archived from the original on 12 January 2022.
- Levy, Alan (2006) [1993]. Nazi Hunter: The Wiesenthal File (Revised 2002 ed.). London: Constable & Robinson. ISBN 978-1-84119-607-7.
- Martin, Douglas (2 December 2005). "A Nazi Past, a Queens Home Life, an Overlooked Death". The New York Times.
- Pick, Hella (19 February 2004). "Knighthood for Nazi hunter". The Guardian.
- Segev, Tom (2010). Simon Wiesenthal: The Life and Legends. New York: Doubleday. ISBN 978-0-385-51946-5.
- "Erasmus Prize: Former Laureates". Praemium Erasmianum Foundation. Archived from the original on 3 May 2019.
- "Julius Viel, 84; Former Nazi Officer Convicted of Murdering Jews". Los Angeles Times. 27 February 2002.
- "River Lights Pictures: The Films". River Lights Pictures. 2025.
- "Simon Wiesenthal Archive: Filmography". Documentation Center of the Association of Jewish Victims of the Nazi Regime. Archived from the original on 2 November 2019.
- "Simon Wiesenthal, 'conscience of the Holocaust,' dies at 96". Haaretz. Amos Schocken. 20 September 2005. Archived from the original on 31 March 2019.
- "Simon Wiesenthal, Israel-Austria Joint Issue". Stamp Community Forum. 3 February 2011.
- "Simon Wiesenthal to be laid to rest Friday in Herzliya". Haaretz. Amos Schocken. 20 September 2005. Archived from the original on 25 July 2018.
- Wallace, Julia (15 May 2007). "I Have Never Forgotten You: The Life and Legacy of Simon Wiesenthal". The Village Voice. Michael Cohen. Archived from the original on 25 July 2018.
- Walters, Guy (2009). Hunting Evil: The Nazi War Criminals Who Escaped and the Quest to Bring Them to Justice. New York: Broadway Books. ISBN 978-0-7679-2873-1.
- Wiesenthal, Simon (1961). Ich jagte Eichmann. Tatsachenbericht [I chased Eichmann. A true story]. Gütersloh: S. Mohn.
- Wiesenthal, Simon; de Metz, Max (1968). Zeilen der hoop. De geheime missie van Christoffel Columbus [Sails of Hope: The Secret Mission of Christopher Columbus] (in Dutch). Amsterdam: H. J. W. Becht. OCLC 492941413.
- Wong, Curtis (30 October 2014). "Tom Dugan Examines The Heroic (And Comedic) Side Of Simon Wiesenthal in One-Man Show". Huffington Post.
