= Dinotopia (miniseries) =

- Based on: Dinotopia by James Gurney
- Teleplay by: Simon Moore
- Directed by: Marco Brambilla
- Starring: David Thewlis; Katie Carr; Jim Carter; Alice Krige; Tyron Leitso; Wentworth Miller; Colin Salmon; Stuart Wilson
- Composer: Trevor Jones
- Countries of origin: United States; United Kingdom; Germany
- Original language: English
- No. of episodes: 3

Production
- Executive producers: Robert Halmi Sr. Robert Halmi Jr.
- Producers: Dusty Symonds; William P. Cartlidge
- Cinematography: Tony Pierce-Roberts
- Editor: Oral Norrie Ottey
- Camera setup: John Bailie
- Running time: 250 minutes (total)
- Production companies: Mat 1 Productions; Hallmark Entertainment

Original release
- Network: ABC (United States); RTL (Germany)
- Release: May 12 – May 14, 2002

Dinotopia is a television miniseries produced by Hallmark Entertainment in association with RTL Television Germany. It is based on the Dinotopia book series by James Gurney, which depicts a fictional utopia in which sapient dinosaurs and humans coexist. The miniseries serves as a sequel to the Dinotopia books, Dinotopia (1992) and Dinotopia: The World Beneath (1995). The main characters of the story are two American teenage boys from contemporary times, unlike the 19th century British castaways in the books; the film loses some of the classicism of the original books. The boys' father's plane crashes into the sea and they get stranded on Dinotopia, where they must adjust to a new society. The story in the film contains references to many of the characters in the book series, with some of their descendants occupying key roles in the plot. The original score was composed by Trevor Jones. This score is performed by the London Symphony Orchestra, conducted by Geoffrey Alexander.

The miniseries premiered as installments of The Wonderful World of Disney from May 12–14, 2002, on ABC. It received an Emmy Award for Outstanding Special Visual Effects for a Miniseries, Movie or a Special. It was soon followed by a television series, which failed to achieve the relative success of the miniseries itself.

== Plot ==
A pair of teenage half-brothers, Karl and David Scott, are on a flight with their father Frank on his private plane when Karl takes over the controls, so his father can fall asleep. After flying into a storm, Karl struggles, causing Frank to retake control before it crashes into the ocean. Frank saves his sons, but has trouble escaping the crashed plane as his seatbelt fails to release. Karl and David wash up on the shore of a large uncharted island. Looking for help, Karl and David meet a man named Cyrus Crabb who informs them that they are in Dinotopia, a hidden civilization where human beings and dinosaurs co-exist peacefully. Crabb leads the boys to a village, where the boys are surprised to see that they are wearing clothes from different cultures in different time periods. There, they witness a young Dinotopian woman, Marion Waldo, pacify a Ankylosaurus with a toothache. The two boys befriend her and hitch a Brachiosaur "bus" ride to Waterfall City. During the journey, the "Brachs" become distressed by an unseen presence. Marion, David, Karl and the Brach bus conductor investigate the forest nearby and find Tyrannosaurus footprints. Marion is unsettled by this, as Tyrannosaurus do not usually hunt in packs. She begins to sense a strange unbalance, after discovering the destroyed remains of a Dinotopian village. For the Brachs's safety, the group spends the night in the village. Later in the night, the group is attacked by the raiding Tyrannosaurus pack. Karl, David and Marion run for their lives, as the Tyrannosaurus hunt them down. Marion trips and falls, and is nearly killed by a Tyrannosaurus when a group of Skybax riders, humans riding on Quetzalcoatlus, distract and scare away the Tyrannosaurus. The Skybax squadron leader, Oonu, offers to escort the Brachs to Waterfall.

In fact, some of the dinosaurs, notably a neurotic but friendly Stenonychosaurus named Zipeau, possess human intelligence and speak perfect English. Among the many rules in Dinotopia is the edict that outsiders are never allowed to leave. Only David whole-heartedly wants to stay. Karl, however, traumatized and embittered by his father's apparent drowning and the Dinotopian’s lack of sympathy, refuses to acclimate.

As Karl and David prepare to take their places in their new surroundings, both boys develop a strong bond with young Marion, who is on the verge of becoming a "matriarch" of the Dinotopian society. Legend has it that their ancestors lived in an underworld that was lit by sunstones. Cyrus has been stealing artifacts and books to try and find a way off the island. Zipeau discovers all the stolen items, but Cyrus knocks him out and throws him in a water canal. Meanwhile, Karl finds a Dino egg and gets sent on a mission by himself. The sun-stones keep mysteriously breaking which causes the dinos to attack. David needs to learn to conquer his fears. Unfortunately, the incursion of vicious carnivores, not to mention an unanticipated human villain, threaten to destroy Dinotopia and everyone living there.

== Cast ==
- David Thewlis as Cyrus Crabb; the son of the books' villain Lee Crabb, and the main antagonist. Deceitful and underhanded, Cyrus Crabb has a derisive view towards Dinotopian society, derogatively referring to the dinosaurs as "scalies". Unsurprisingly, he has no dinosaur partner.
- Katie Carr as Marion Seville; a beautiful young Dinotopian woman who is the granddaughter of the books' protagonist Oriana Nascava and the daughter of Mayor Waldo of Waterfall City. Level-headed, yet spunky and idealistic, she serves as David and Karl's guide in Dinotopia. She has a rebellious streak, but uses her rebelliousness for the greater good and believes in doing for what is right. Both Karl and David develop crushes on her, and she in turn cares for them both, but she does not choose between them before the end of the series. Zipeau eventually becomes her dinosaur partner.
- Jim Carter as Lord Mayor Waldo Seville; the Mayor of Waterfall City, Rosemary's estranged husband, and Marion's father. At first appearing joyous over the Scott Brothers' arrival, he shows a dark side to his personality as an arrogant ruler who is oblivious of how urgency of the failing sunstones and the imminent dangers of the sunstones' failing. In spite of his arrogance, Mayor Waldo deeply cares for his daughter, Marion, and wants the best for her. Eventually, he does realize the error of his ways and comes to fully understand the danger Dinotopia faces. Following David's heroic actions in saving Dinotopia, he pardons the Scott brothers and awards David for his bravery. His dinosaur partner, if he has one, is not revealed.
- Alice Krige as Rosemary Seville; the Matriarch of the Earth Farm, Waldo's estranged wife, and Marion's mother. A level-headed, spiritually-centered pacifist, Rosemary has faith in Marion, even believing her claims that there is an imbalance, something her estranged husband has failed to notice. In the end, she gets back together with a reformed Mayor Waldo. She has no single dinosaur partner, instead living in accord with all land-dwelling dinosaurs.
- Wentworth Miller as David Scott; a dolphinback newly arrived to Dinotopia and Karl's half-brother. Bookish and practical yet kind, David quickly warms to Dinotopia and loses all desire to leave. Through training as a Skybax rider, he learns to reconcile his differences with his brother and to face his fears (quite literally, in the case of his fear of heights). He becomes the first human to partner with a Pteranodon, who he names "Freefall", rather than a Quetzalcoatlus, an event which shocks Dinotopian society. David and Freefall later play a heroic role in saving Waterfall City from a Pteranodon attack.
- Tyron Leitso as Karl Scott; a dolphinback newly arrived to Dinotopia and David's half-brother. Reckless, rebellious, yet charming, Karl initially wants to leave Dinotopia and find his and David's father. He learns about responsibility during his time in Dinotopia. Karl is partnered with a baby Chasmosaurus by Rosemary, but at the time he is so reluctant to join Dinotopian society that he names her "26", the number of the egg she hatched from. David plays a heroic role in opening the Dinotopians' eyes to the danger of the failing sunstones and how their seeming arrogance has led them astray from the real issue of the imbalance. After the attack on Waterfall City, he happily accepts his role as 26's human partner and surrogate parent.
- Colin Salmon as Capt. Oonu; the stoic leader of the Skybax corps and the grandson of Oolu, who held the same position in the books. Strict and no-nonsense, he has high ambitions for his cadets, especially in David, whom he sees potential, in spite of the latter's fear of heights. Like all Skybax riders before David, his dinosaur partner is a Quetzalcoatlus.
- Stuart Wilson as Frank Scott; the father of David and Karl, believed killed in the storm that brought his sons to Dinotopia.
- Lee Evans as Zipeau (formally, Prof. Zipeau Steneosaurus); a Stenonychosaurus scholar. Neurotic, yet mild-mannered and highly intelligent, he is very loyal to the Scott boys and has a platonic fondness for Marion. He speaks the human tongue with the same accent as educated Dinotopian humans. Zipeau's human partner was Sylvia of the Hatchery, a supporting character in the books who has died by the time the series begins. Zipeau eventually accepts Marion as his new human partner.
- Hannah Yelland as Cadet Romana Denison; a Skybax rider, the daughter of the books' protagonist Will Denison. She becomes a good friend of David Scott during their training under Oonu, and is strongly implied to harbor feelings for him. Like all Skybax riders, she partners with a Quetzalcoatlus and is astonished when David partners with a Pterandon instead.
- Terry Jones as Messenger Bird (voice). A Prehistoric parrot-like bird who acts as a long distance mailman and telegram deliverer. In a running gag, he says "End of Message." whenever he completes finishing a message.
- Anna Maguire as Samantha Seville, daughter of Waldo and Rosemary and sister of Marion.
- Geraldine Chaplin as Grandmother Oriana; the only character from the books to appear in person in the series. She is the grandmother of Marion and Samantha, although it is not clear if she is Waldo or Rosemary's mother.

== Production ==
Plans for a film based on Dinotopia were previously rejected due to the expense of creating a world populated by both humans and dinosaurs. Both Columbia Pictures and Disney at one time made the attempt, but both studios abandoned the idea, with Disney opting to make its own homegrown film, Dinosaur in 2000. Hallmark Entertainment CEO Robert Halmi Sr. then purchased the rights after having read the books.

Halmi was willing to spend $80 million on the film, despite the lukewarm performance of his previous fantasy miniseries, The Tenth Kingdom. ABC had so much confidence in the miniseries that they began shooting episodes of the spin-off television series before the miniseries had aired.

More than 75% of the scenes in the miniseries required visual effects, many of which required interaction between the live-action human actors and the animatronic or computer-animated dinosaurs. The animated dinosaurs were created by a London-based company, Framestore CFC, who also did the CGI work for the Walking with Dinosaurs series. The series also used other visual effects techniques such as digital set extensions. Many of the sets were only partially built, the rest being done digitally, to create the enormous buildings used by both dinosaurs and humans in the film. Even so, the actual set for Waterfall City, Dinotopia's capital, took up five-and-a-half acres of the back lot of England's Pinewood Studios. Jim Henson's Creature Shop provided the animatronic dinosaurs.

Although Dinotopia started out as a TV miniseries, later all the parts were combined and put on DVD as one film, except in the UK, where the mini-series was put onto discs as separate episodes.

== Featured species ==
- Ankylosaurus
- Brachiosaurus ("Brach")
- Chasmosaurus (incorrectly classified as a hadrosaur and mispronounced as "Chasmiosaurus")
- Dimorphodon (portrayed inaccurately as a feathered bird, in reality, a pterosaur)
- Mosasaurus (more crocodilian in appearance than in real life, with arms and legs instead of flippers)
- Parasaurolophus ("Overlander"/Guard), a hadrosaur erroneously depicted as an obligate biped.
- Pteranodon
- Stegosaurus (one can be seen in the first episode of the mini-series, and is heavily featured in the third episode of the TV series, "Handful of Dust." In the canon of Dinotopia they have the longest natural lifespans compared to any other species.)
- Dunkleosteus (resembles more of an eel-like creature than in real life, with spikes on its face instead of armor plating)
- Quetzalcoatlus ("Skybax")
- Stenonychosaurus
- Tyrannosaurus rex
- Triceratops (mentioned by Captain Oonu after the first Tyrannosaurus attack)

== See also ==
- List of films featuring dinosaurs
