= House Call (film) =

- Theatrical release poster
- Directed by: Ben Verbong
- Written by: Jean van de Velde
- Story by: Gijs Versluys
- Produced by: Chris Brouwer; Haig Ballan
- Starring: Renée Soutendijk; Victor Löw
- Cinematography: Theo Bierkens
- Music by: Patrick Seymour
- Production companies: Movies Film Productions; TROS
- Distributed by: PolyGram Filmed Entertainment
- Release date: 21 April 1994
- Running time: 105 minutes
- Country: Netherlands
- Language: Dutch

House Call (Dutch: De Flat) is a 1994 Dutch mystery film directed by Ben Verbong.

== Plot ==
Roos Hartman is a young doctor who lives with her son in a large apartment complex. When a fellow tenant is brutally murdered, the police and Hartman's friends suspect her mysterious neighbour, Eric Coenen. As she becomes romantically involved with Coenen, she doubts he would commit such a crime, but soon she begins to investigate the case further and discovers some startling facts relating to his involvement.

== Cast ==
- Renée Soutendijk as Roos Hartman
- Victor Löw as Eric Coenen
- Hans Hoes as Jacques Posthuma
- Jaimy Siebel as Davy
- Mirjam de Rooij as Lidy van Oosterom
- Leslie de Gruyter as Hennie van Oosterom
- Guy Sonnen as Cees den Boer
- Huib Rooymans as Erwin Nijkamp
- Miguel Stigter as Marcel van der Kooy
- Jacques Commandeur as Charles Uffingh
- Maud Hempel as Nel van Lier
- Ann Hasekamp as Mrs. Veenstra
- Peter Smits as Officer
- Jaap Maarleveld as Carel Wijnsma

== Release ==
The film opened on 35 screens in the Netherlands and grossed 91,053 guilders ($48,176) in its opening four day weekend, finishing in eighth place at the Netherlands box office.
