= Inside the Third Reich (film) =

1982 American television film

- Based on: Inside the Third Reich by Albert Speer
- Written by: E. Jack Neuman
- Directed by: Marvin J. Chomsky
- Starring: Rutger Hauer; Derek Jacobi; Blythe Danner; John Gielgud; Ian Holm; Elke Sommer; Trevor Howard; Robert Vaughn; Renée Soutendijk
- Theme music composer: Fred Karlin
- Country of origin: United States
- Original language: English

Production
- Producer: E. Jack Neuman
- Cinematography: Tony Imi
- Editors: Richard Belding; Les Green; James T. Heckert
- Running time: 250 minutes
- Production company: ABC Circle Films

Original release
- Network: ABC
- Release: May 9, 1982

Inside the Third Reich is a 1982 television film based on the book Inside the Third Reich by Albert Speer directed by Marvin J. Chomsky. It was originally broadcast on network television by the American Broadcasting Company (ABC).

Speer was portrayed in the movie by Rutger Hauer, Joseph Goebbels by Ian Holm, Randy Quaid as Putzi Hanfstaengel, and Adolf Hitler by Derek Jacobi, a role for which he was nominated for an Emmy. The miniseries won two Emmy Awards for Outstanding Film Sound Editing and Outstanding Directing in a Limited Series or a Special; DGA also outstanding directorial achievement in dramatic specials.

== Cast ==
- Rutger Hauer - Albert Speer
- John Gielgud - Albert Speer Sr.
- Maria Schell - Mrs. Speer
- Blythe Danner - Margarete Speer
- Trevor Howard - Professor Heinrich Tessenow
- Derek Jacobi - Adolf Hitler
- Randy Quaid - Putzi Hanfstaengl
- Stephen Collins - Karl Hanke
- Ian Holm - Joseph Goebbels
- Elke Sommer - Magda Goebbels
- Renée Soutendijk - Eva Braun
- Robert Vaughn - Field Marshal Erhard Milch
- Viveca Lindfors - Gypsy Woman
- Zoë Wanamaker - Annemarie Kempf
- Michael Gough - Bernhard Rust
- Mort Sahl - Werner Finck
- Maurice Roëves - Rudolf Hess
- Derek Newark - Martin Bormann
- George Murcell - Hermann Göring
- David Shawyer - Heinrich Himmler
- Hans Meyer - Ernst Kaltenbrunner
