= Eve of Destruction (film) =

1991 film by Duncan Gibbins

- Theatrical release poster
- Directed by: Duncan Gibbins
- Written by: Duncan Gibbins; Yale Udoff
- Produced by: David Madden
- Starring: Gregory Hines; Renée Soutendijk
- Cinematography: Alan Hume
- Edited by: Caroline Biggerstaff
- Music by: Philippe Sarde
- Production companies: Nelson Entertainment; Interscope Communications
- Distributed by: Orion Pictures
- Release dates: January 18, 1991 (United States); August 7, 1991 (France); December 6, 1991 (Netherlands)
- Running time: 100 minutes
- Country: United States
- Language: English
- Budget: $7-13 million
- Box office: $5.4 million

Eve of Destruction is a 1991 American science fiction action thriller film. The film is about a nuclear armed prototype android named EVE gone amok while being field tested by the military in a big city. The film stars Gregory Hines as Col. Jim McQuade and Dutch actress Renée Soutendijk (in her first U.S. film) with the dual roles as the robot's creator Dr. Eve Simmons, and the robot Eve herself.

== Plot ==
EVE VIII is a military android created to look and sound exactly like her creator, Dr. Eve Simmons. When the robot is damaged during a bank robbery, it accesses memories it was programmed with by her creator. The memories used, though, are dark and tragic ones.

The robot is also programmed as a killing machine if anyone tries to stop her mission. Colonel Jim McQuade is tasked with eliminating the unstoppable machine. With the help of Dr. Simmons, he tries to outthink the intelligent and emotional robotic doppelgänger.

== Cast ==
- Gregory Hines as Col. Jim McQuade
- Renée Soutendijk as Dr. Eve Simmons/EVE VIII
- Kurt Fuller as Bill Schneider
- Michael Greene as General Curtis
- John M. Jackson as Peter Arnold
- George P. Wilbur as Trooper
- Kevin McCarthy as William Simmons (uncredited)

== Production ==
Principal photography began in December 1989 and took place at an abandoned Budweiser glass factory in Valencia, California which the production converted into a soundstage. Duncan Gibbins said the casting of Gregory Hines and Renée Soutendijk as the leads was not only motivated by the film's modest budget, but also because he wanted to cast performers against type.

== Reception ==
The film received negative reviews from critics, having a 20% "rotten" score on RottenTomatoes.com. Vincent Canby gave a negative review in The New York Times, calling the film "an undistinguished, barely functional action-melodrama."

=== Box office ===
The movie opened with $2.5 million. It finished its run with a total of $5,451,119 against a $13 million budget, making it a box-office bomb.

== Home media ==
Eve of Destruction released on VHS on August 8, 1991, from New Line Home Video. Also, MGM Home Entertainment released Eve of Destruction on DVD on July 15, 2003.
