= Renée Soutendijk =

Dutch actress (born 1957)

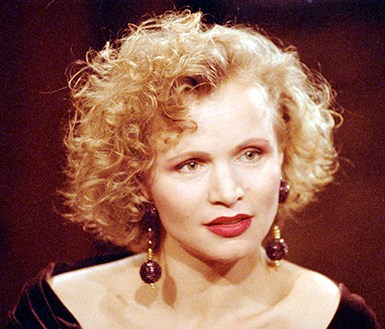
- Soutendijk in 1992
- Born: Renette Pauline Soutendijk; 21 May 1957 (age 69); The Hague, South Holland, Netherlands
- Occupation: Actress
- Years active: 1978–present
- Spouse: Thed Lenssen
- Children: 2

Renette Pauline Soutendijk (born 21 May 1957), known professionally as Renée Soutendijk (Dutch pronunciation: [rəˌneː ˈsʌutə(n)dɛik]), is a Dutch actress. A gymnast in her youth, Soutendijk began her acting career in the late 1970s. She was a favorite star of director Paul Verhoeven's films, and is perhaps best known for her work in his 1980 release Spetters and 1983's The Fourth Man. Her good looks and striking blond hair secured her status as a Dutch sex symbol in the 1980s.

Soutendijk attempted to establish herself in the United States in the late 1980s, and appeared in the science fiction film Eve of Destruction (1991). Since the 2000s she has played a number of television and stage roles, and appeared as one of the leads in the 2012 RTL 4 television series Moordvrouw. She has also had supporting roles in the American drama A Perfect Man (2013) and in Luca Guadagnino's Suspiria (2018).

== Life and career ==
=== Early life ===
Soutendijk was born in The Hague, Netherlands, on 21 May 1957. In her youth, Soutendijk was a qualifying Olympic gymnast. She studied acting at the Academy for Podium Formation in The Hague.

=== Television and film beginnings ===
Soutendijk made her television debut in the Dutch television series Dagboek van een herdershond (English: Dutch the Shepherd Dog (1979–1980). She began her film career playing the heroines in the Paul Verhoeven-directed cult films Spetters (1980) and The Fourth Man (1983). Spetters established her as a sex symbol; the movie and its star attracted attention in the United States as well, and The New York Times saw her "stylish performance" of a "compelling character" as a focal point of the movie. In the early 1980s, Soutendijk, Monique van de Ven, and Willeke van Ammelrooy were the three best-known actresses in Dutch cinema, and most Dutch movies featured one of the three. The movie that marked her breakthrough as an actress in a major role, though, is considered to be The Girl with the Red Hair (1981), in which she played Dutch resistance fighter Hannie Schaft. From 1981 to 1989 she played in Zeg 'ns Aaa, one of the longest-running and most popular Dutch sitcoms. In 1983, Soutendijk gave birth to her first child, a daughter named Caro.

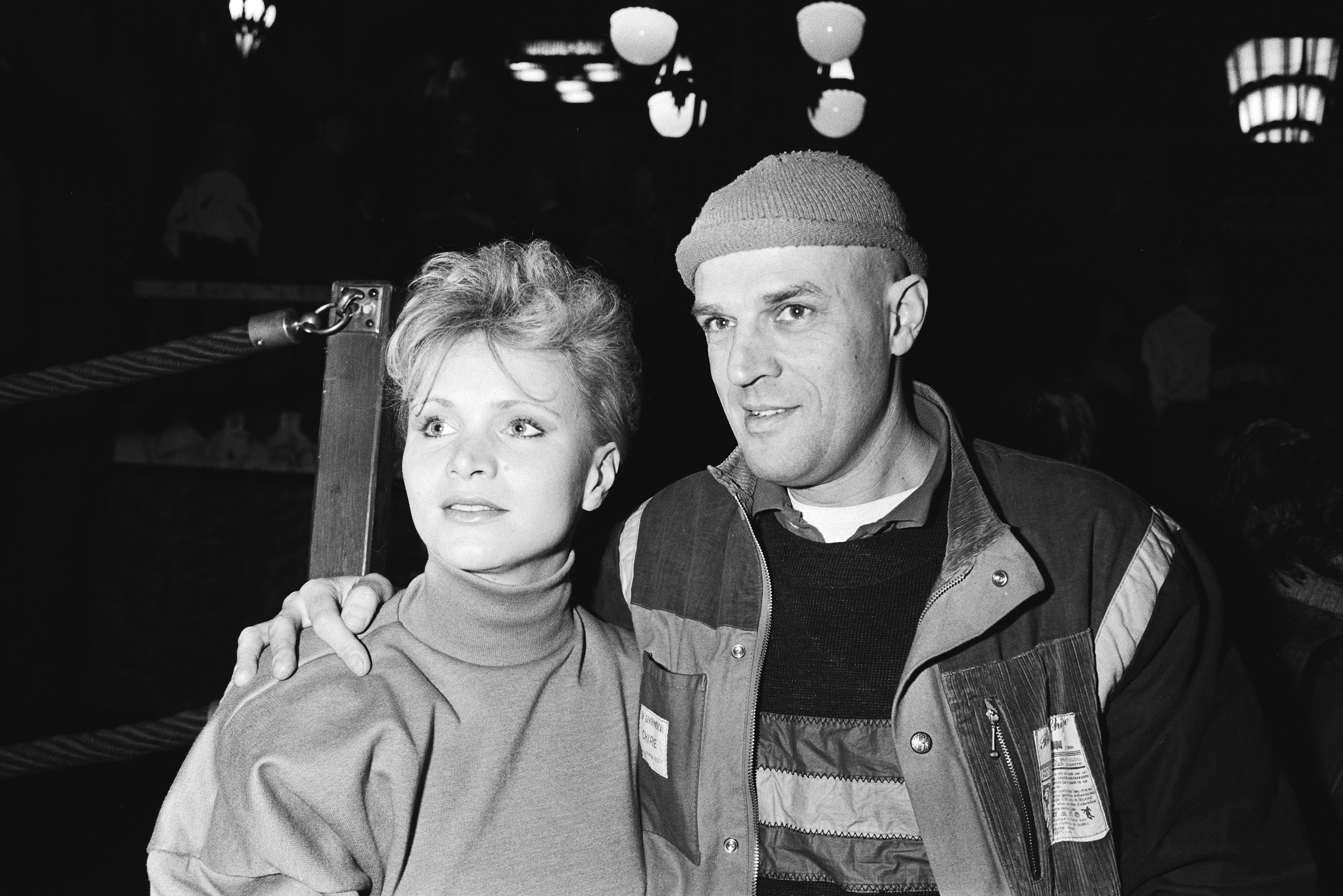
Soutendijk and Jeroen Krabbé promoting The Fourth Man, 1983

Soutendijk's first English-language role was as Eva Braun in the made-for-TV movie Inside the Third Reich. Her subsequent TV movie roles included Anna Mons in Peter the Great (1986) and Mrs. Simon Wiesenthal in Murderers Among Us: The Simon Wiesenthal Story (1989). She sought a career in Hollywood and lived in the United States for a year and a half. She played opposite Academy Award nominee Chris Sarandon in the Holocaust-themed movie Forced March (1989), and the title character in Eve of Destruction (1991), in which she portrayed an android opposite Gregory Hines.

In the late 1990s she played in another Dutch film (De Flat). She also acted in German television movies (and series, including Tatort) in which, she said, she was rarely typecast and played more interesting characters. In 1996, she gave birth to her son, Jaïr. The films Dial 9 and Met grote blijdschap (With Great Joy), which were both released in 2001, marked her return to the Dutch movie-screen after a four-year absence.

=== 2000s and later career ===
Soutendijk subsequently played roles in television shows and as a stage actress, playing for instance Queen Juliana (2006) and a woman dying of cancer in Margaret Edson's Wit (2010). In 2011, Soutendijk was given the Rembrandt Award for her body of work. That same year, news came that Soutendijk was to star in a television series for RTL 4, Moordvrouw, a police drama. In 2018, Soutendijk had a supporting role in Luca Guadagnino's Suspiria, a reimagining of the Dario Argento film of the same name.

She appeared in the 2022 photography game show Het perfecte plaatje.

In September 2023 Soutendijk was the recipient of Golden Calf for Best Leading Role (the most important Dutch film award) for her main role in the critically acclaimed film Sweet Dreams.

In 2025, Soutendijk was appointed as a member of the jury at the 78th Locarno Film Festival for Concorso Internazionale – Main Competition.

== Filmography ==
=== Film ===
Year	Title	Role	Notes
1978	Pastorale 1943	Marie Bovenkamp	
1978	Deadly Sin	Renée	
1979	A Woman Like Eve	Sigrid	
1980	Spetters	Fientje	
1981	The Girl with the Red Hair	Hannie Schaft	
1981	The Forbidden Bacchanal	Corrie	
1982	Inside the Third Reich	Eva Braun	Television film
1982	Hedwig: The Quiet Lakes	Hedwig	
1983	The Fourth Man	Christine Halsslag	
1983	An Bloem	Loedie	
1984	The Cold Room	Lili	Television film
1984	Out of Order	Marion	
1985	Private Resistance	Trudi	
1986	Op hoop van zegen	Jo	
1986	Motten im Licht		
1987	Scoop	Ishmaelia - Kätchen	
1987	The Second Victory	Traudi Holzinger	
1987	A Month Later	Liesbeth	
1987	The Madonna Man	Juliane Mundt	
1987	Der Fall Boran (a.k.a. Boran – Zeit zum Zielen)	Linda Mars	
1988	King of the Olympics: The Lives and Loves of Avery Brundage	Linnea Dresden	Television film
1988	Wherever You Are...	Nina	
1989	Murderers Among Us: The Simon Wiesenthal Story	Cyla	Television film
1989	Forced March	Myra	
1989	Grave Secrets	Iris Norwood	
1991	Eve of Destruction	Dr. Eve Simmons / Eve VIII	
1991	Keeper of the City	Vickie Benedetto	Television film
1993	The Betrayed	Olga Grond	Television film
1993	Seventh Heaven	Charlyne	
1994	House Call	Roos Hartman	
1996	The Little Riders	Beatrix Hunter	
1998	Hauptsache Leben	Corinna	
1999	Dance of the Dolphins	Claire Strauss	Television film
2000	Anna Wunder	Sophie	
2001	With Great Joy	Els	
2001	Hochzeit zu viert	Susanne Berthold	
2001	Hanna - Wo bist Du?	Erika Strom	Television film
2003	Eine Liebe in Afrika	Jane	Television film
2008	Radeloos	Vera Scholte	
2009	Der Mann aus der Pfalz	Hannelore Kohl	Television film
2013	A Perfect Man	Martha	
2018	Redbad	Idwina	
2018	Suspiria	Miss Huller	
2023	Sweet Dreams	Agathe	
2023	Neem Me Mee	Nienke	

=== Television ===
Year	Title	Role	Notes
1985	The Hitchhiker	Sara Kendal	Episode: "Murderous Feelings"
1986	Peter the Great	Anna Mons	Miniseries
1999	Schimanski: Sehnsucht	Eva Marsfeldt	Episode: "Sehnsucht"
2000–2005	Tatort: Bittere Mandeln	Eva Maria Klein / Evelyn	2 episodes
2002	The Enclave	Ilse Terhoef	Miniseries
2008	S1ngle	Edith	5 episodes
2008–2009	Leipzig Homicide	Maja Peters	4 episodes
2009	Vienna Crime Squad	Wanda Wolf	Episode: "Preis der Schönheit"
2009	Ein starkes Team	Katarina Kamm	Episode: "Geschlechterkrieg"
2012	Van God los	Ellen	Episode: "D.I.S.C.O."
2012	Moordvrouw	Carla Vreeswijk	50 episodes
2016–2017	Centraal Medisch Centrum	Emily Zomer	16 episodes

== Accolades ==
Award ceremony	Year	Category	Nominee	Result	Ref.
Locarno Film Festival	2023	Pardo for Best Performance	Sweet Dreams	Won	
Netherlands Film Festival	1985	Golden Calf for Best Actress	Private Resistance	Won	
Netherlands Film Festival	2023	Golden Calf for Best Leading Role	Sweet Dreams	Won	

== Sources ==
- Skin, Mr. (2004). Mr. Skin's Skincyclopedia. New York: Macmillan. ISBN 978-0-312-33144-3.
- Thomson, David (2008). The New Biographical Dictionary of Film (Reprint ed.). New York: Knopf Doubleday Publishing Group. ISBN 978-0-375-70940-1.
