= A Perfect Man (2013 film) =

- Directed by: Kees Van Oostrum
- Starring: Jeanne Tripplehorn; Liev Schreiber
- Distributed by: Double Eagle
- Release date: November 9, 2013
- Running time: 95 minutes
- Country: United States
- Language: English

A Perfect Man is a 2013 film directed by Kees Van Oostrum.

== Plot ==
A wandering man (Schreiber) has an affair with the wrong woman, leading to a separation.

== Cast ==
- Jeanne Tripplehorn as Nina
- Liev Schreiber as James
- Joelle Carter as Lynn
- Louise Fletcher as Abbie
- Renée Soutendijk as Martha
- Huub Stapel as Pieter
- Katie Carr as Laura

== Critical reviews ==
The Hollywood Reporter's John DeFore describes the script as deficient.

=== Critical response ===
On review aggregator Rotten Tomatoes, the film has an approval rating of 20% based on 5 reviews, with an average rating of 4.77/10.
