= Yaron Svoray =

Israeli journalist

- ירון סבוראי
- Occupations: Journalist, Author, Nazi hunter
- Known for: Six-month infiltration of Germany's neo-Nazi groups and subsequent book In Hitler's Shadow

Yaron Svoray (Hebrew: ירון סבוראי) is an Israeli former police detective, author, and lecturer, most notable for his work against Neo-Nazis. Svoray infiltrated German neo-Nazi groups, contributed to the arrest of Nazi war criminal Erich Priebke, and has also been active in searching for treasure looted by the Nazis.

== Biography ==
Yaron Svoray was born in Israel. His father, Yehuda Soberski, born in Germany, immigrated to Mandatory Palestine with his family in 1938. The rest of the Soberski family perished in the Holocaust. His mother, Rachel Stern, was born in Egypt and moved with her family to Romania when she was a child. Most of her relatives were murdered in the Holocaust and she fled to Mandate Palestine with some of her family in 1943.

Svoray served in the Paratroopers Brigade of the Israel Defense Forces, and later worked as a detective in the Israeli Central Police Command.

He traveled to the USA where he earned his bachelor's and master's degree in media and communication, and worked as a journalist and a lecturer.

== Intelligence career ==
In the early 1990s, he went undercover inside a German neo-Nazi organization. He convinced them that he was an Australian neo-Nazi named Ron Furey who wanted to join the German neo-Nazis. Svoray's investigation brought him into contact with key neo-Nazi leaders. Furthermore, there was evidence that the German groups had managed to forge links with similar groups in South America and the United States. Svoray's book In Hitler’s Shadow was later adapted into a 1995 HBO special, The Infiltrator, starring Oliver Platt as Svoray.

While working undercover, Svoray discovered that a Nazi war criminal Erich Priebke, had escaped to South America and lived there under an assumed name. The intelligence he gathered facilitated the capture and arrest of Priebke.

In 2007, Svoray found the dumping ground for the destroyed remains of Jewish property plundered during Kristallnacht. The dump, situated in a forest in Brandenburg, is the size of several football fields. An extensive range of personal and ceremonial items were unearthed there.

In 2013 Svoray and his team began a search for boxes full of gold dumped into the Stolpsee lake in Germany. This project is being filmed by National Geographic.

== Published works ==
To the general public, Svoray is probably best known for his hunt of Nazi-era diamonds. Svoray’s search was documented on the History Channel special Blood from a Stone, which was based on the book, Blood from a Stone, written by Yaron Svoray and Richard Hammer and published by the Tor Books division of St. Martin’s Press.

Svoray's first book was In Hitler's Shadow, an undercover investigation of Germany's neo-Nazi movement and its connections to international fascist groups. Svoray's research was assisted by the Simon Wiesenthal Center. The book was co-written by Nick Taylor.

Svoray's next book was Gods of Death, published in 1997 by Simon & Schuster and co-written with Thomas Hughes. The book is an account of Svoray's hunt for the source of and sense behind a snuff film he witnessed as part of his initiation into a neo-Nazi group during an undercover investigation. This time Svoray presented himself as a middleman first for buyers and then for dealers of snuff films, trying to fake his way into the highly secretive industry, at several points running afoul of the Russian mob in Israel and various criminal organizations in the US, Thailand, Germany, England, France, and the Balkans.

== See also ==
- Nazi hunter
- Tuviah Friedman
- Simon Wiesenthal
- Serge and Beate Klarsfeld

== Sources ==
- Svoray, Yaron; Hughes, Thomas (9 September 1997). Gods of death: around the world, behind closed doors, operates an ultra-secret business of sex and death: one man hunts the truth about snuff films. Simon & Schuster. ISBN 0-684-81445-5.
