= The Infiltrator (1995 film) =

- Based on: In Hitler's Shadow by Yaron Svoray; Nick Taylor
- Teleplay by: Guy Andrews
- Story by: Robert J. Avrech; Guy Andrews
- Directed by: John Mackenzie
- Starring: Oliver Platt; Arliss Howard; Tony Haygarth; Alan King; Julian Glover
- Music by: Hal Lindes
- Country of origin: United States
- Original language: English

Production
- Cinematography: Mick Coulter
- Editor: Graham Walker
- Running time: 92 minutes
- Production company: HBO Showcase

Original release
- Network: HBO
- Release: June 24, 1995

The Infiltrator is a 1995 American thriller drama film directed by John Mackenzie based on the book In Hitler's Shadow: An Israeli's Journey Inside Germany's Neo-Nazi Movement by Yaron Svoray and Nick Taylor about an Israeli freelance journalist who travels to Germany in the early 1990s and uncovers a dangerously pervasive underground Neo-Nazi faction with the intent to bring Nazism back to the forefront in Germany. It stars Oliver Platt, Arliss Howard, Tony Haygarth, Julian Glover and Michael Byrne.

The film was released on June 24, 1995, on HBO. It was final film under HBO Showcase banner before it was renamed to HBO NYC Productions in 1996.

== Cast ==
- Oliver Platt as Yaron Svoray
- Arliss Howard as Ricky Eaton
- Tony Haygarth as Gunther Fischer
- Michael Byrne as Dieter Creutz
- Julian Glover as Bielert
- Alex Kingston as Anna

== Original airing ==
The film originally aired on HBO on June 24, 1995.

== Reception ==
Variety praised the high quality of performances and production values of the film and called it "powerful TV, all the more unsettling for reminding us that right-wing extremism didn’t die with Hitler."
