= Josef Schwammberger =

Austrian Nazi SS Officer (1912–2004)

Josef Franz Leo Schwammberger (14 February 1912 – 3 December 2004) was a German SS (Schutzstaffel) Non-Commissioned Officer, Oberscharführer, war criminal, and commandant of the camps in Rozwadów, Przemyśl, and Mielec.

== Biography ==
During the Second World War, Schwammberger was a commander of various SS Arbeitslager (forced-labor camps) in the Kraków district (late August 1942 until spring 1944).

He was arrested in Innsbruck, Austria, in the French occupation zone after the war on 19 July 1945, but escaped in January 1948 and within months was able to enter Argentina, where he lived under his own name and obtained citizenship. West German authorities sought his extradition beginning in 1973, and Argentine officials tracked him down on 13 November 1987. After two years of fighting extradition, he was returned to West Germany in May 1990 for trial. His capture cost the German state of Baden-Württemberg just under 500,000 Deutschmark.

At his trial, which lasted nearly a year (1991 until 1992), Schwammberger denied being guilty of the crimes of which he was charged; he simply admitted that "Ghetto A" was taken to the Przemyśl camp. On 18 May 1992 he was sentenced by the Stuttgart regional court (Landgericht) to life imprisonment, which he was to serve in Mannheim. He was found guilty of seven counts of murder and 32 counts of being an accessory to murder.

The court ruled that on 21 September 1942, which was Yom Kippur, the Jewish Day of Atonement, Mr. Schwammberger sought out and killed a Jewish rabbi in Rozwadów, a crime that Judge Luippold called one of his "most despicable and reprehensible." In addition, the judge found that Mr. Schwammberger was an organizer of a mass execution in the Przemyśl camp on 2 September 1943, in which at least 500 Jewish prisoners were shot by Gestapo soldiers.

In August 2002, the Mannheim regional court declined a parole request due to the unusual cruelty of his offences; he had been found guilty of carrying out arbitrary murders based on racial hatred against Jewish people.

His wife Käthe Schwammberger died in 2003 at the age of 87 in Argentina before Schwammberger himself died in prison on 3 December 2004, aged 92.

The Simon Wiesenthal Center was instrumental in bringing him to justice. Also contributing to the case against Schwammberger, including his extradition from Argentina, was Elliot Welles and Anna Unger Weinberg.
