= Nazi hunting =

Individual who hunts down Nazis and Nazi collaborators

Nazi hunting was the investigation and pursuit of former Nazi officials and SS after the end of World War II. This involves tracking down and gathering information on such individuals, typically for use at trial on charges of war crimes and crimes against humanity during the Holocaust. Nazi hunters were active around the world for decades after the fall of the Third Reich, when many key Nazi figures escaped military trial by fleeing to South America and elsewhere. Prominent Nazi hunters include Simon Wiesenthal, Tuviah Friedman, Serge Klarsfeld, Beate Klarsfeld, Ian Sayer, Yaron Svoray, Elliot Welles, and Efraim Zuroff. Nazi hunting may overlap with the pursuit of Nazi collaborators.

== History ==
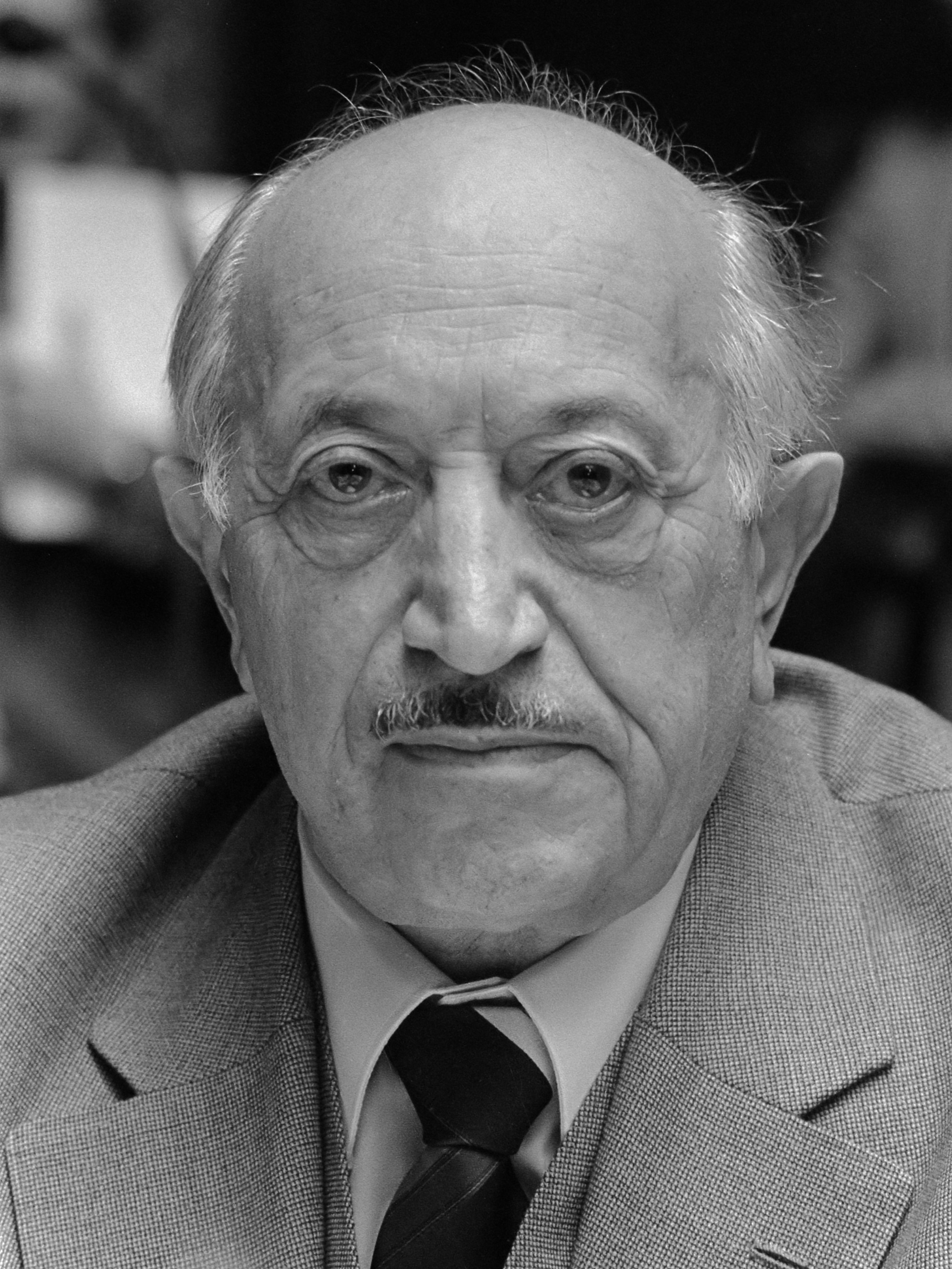
Simon Wiesenthal

With the onset of the Cold War following World War II, both the Western Allies of World War II and the Soviet Union sought out former Nazi scientists and operatives for programs such as Operation Paperclip and Operation Osoaviakhim. Cooperative former Nazis, such as Wernher von Braun and Reinhard Gehlen, were occasionally given state protection in return for valuable information or services. At the time, Gehlen had been chief of the German Federal Intelligence Service or Bundesnachrichtendienst (federal intelligence agency), founder of the Gehlen Org, "a true life version of ODESSA" network, which helped exfiltrate Nazis from Europe. Other Nazis used ratlines to escape post-war Europe to places such as South America.

In response, Nazi hunters sought out fugitives on their own or formed groups, such as the Simon Wiesenthal Center. Methods used by Nazi hunters include offering rewards for information, reviewing immigration and military records, and launching civil lawsuits.

In later decades, Nazi hunters found greater cooperation with Western and South American governments and the state of Israel. By the end of the 20th century, pursuit of former Nazis declined, because most of the generation active in Nazi leadership had died.

== Notable targets ==
The Simon Wiesenthal Center publishes an annual report on Nazi war criminals. Some notable targets of Nazi hunters have included:

- Alois Brunner, Eichmann's assistant and Commander of Drancy internment camp, was one of the key figures in implementing the Final Solution. Was pursued by the Israeli intelligence agency, Mossad, in Syria, evaded capture until his death around 2001 in Damascus.
- Herberts Cukurs, the "Butcher of Riga", was assassinated by Mossad agents in Montevideo, Uruguay in 1965.
- Adolf Eichmann was pursued by Wiesenthal before being captured and smuggled from Argentina in 1960 by Mossad and was tried in Israel, where he was executed in 1962.
- Boļeslavs Maikovskis, a Latvian Nazi collaborator, was pursued to Mineola, New York by Welles. Maikovskis eventually emigrated to West Germany in 1987, where he was found unfit to stand trial due to age.
- Josef Mengele, the "Angel of Death", was sought in various South American countries by Mossad, Wiesenthal, and the Klarsfelds. He evaded capture until his accidental death in Brazil in 1979; his remains were identified in 1992.
- Erich Priebke, an SS officer responsible for the mass murder of Italian civilians, was interviewed openly in Argentina in 1994, by ABC Primetime Live host Sam Donaldson. He was subsequently extradited to Italy and, in 1998, sentenced to house arrest for life. Priebke died in Rome in 2013, at the age of 100 and was buried in a prison cemetery because no church community was willing to offer a burial site.
- Eduard Roschmann was sought by Wiesenthal in Argentina. The Argentine government made plans for his extradition public in 1977, allowing him to escape to Paraguay. He apparently died the same year, but Wiesenthal was skeptical that the body was Roschmann's.
- Dinko Šakić was pursued to Argentina by Zuroff. Making no attempt to hide, he made several media appearances before being extradited to Croatia in 1998, where he was sentenced to 20 years, and died in 2008.
- Josef Schwammberger was traced to Argentina by the Simon Wiesenthal Center and Welles. Extradited to West Germany in 1990, he was sentenced to life imprisonment in 1992 and died in prison in 2004.
- Franz Stangl, the commandant of the Sobibór and Treblinka extermination camps, was caught by Wiesenthal in São Paulo in 1967. He was extradited to Germany in 1970 and sentenced to life in prison, where he died the following year.
- Gustav Wagner, the "Wolf", was exposed by Wiesenthal in Brazil in 1978. He was arrested, but Brazil refused to extradite him to West Germany. Wagner was found dead in an alleged suicide in São Paulo in 1980.
- Klaus Barbie, the "Butcher of Lyon", was extradited from Bolivia to France in 1983, after earlier attempts by Serge and Beate Klarsfeld to track him. Until Bolivia's transition to democracy, he had been protected by the US and German intelligence services for anti-Soviet intelligence purposes, and employed by the Bolivian army under an alias. Sentenced to life imprisonment in 1987, he died in 1991.

== See also ==
- Pursuit of Nazi collaborators
- Hunters (2020 TV series), an American TV series following Nazi hunters in a fictional timeline
