= Elliot Welles =

Holocaust survivor

Elliot Welles (birth name Kurt Sauerquell; 18 September 1927 – 28 November 2006) was a Holocaust survivor who for more than two decades until his retirement in 2003, directed the B'nai B'rith Anti-Defamation League's task force on Nazi war criminals. Welles was a survivor of both the Riga Ghetto and the Stutthof concentration camp in German-occupied Poland.

Welles is known in particular for his work on the case of Boļeslavs Maikovskis, who had been charged with ordering the arrests that led to the mass execution of 200 Latvian villagers during the war. A native of Latvia, Maikovskis was sentenced to death in absentia by a Soviet court in 1965. He continued to live quietly in Mineola, New York, where he had settled after the war, before fleeing to Germany in 1987.

Because of Welles' tireless work on this case, Maikovskis (then 86) was put on trial in Germany in 1990. The trial was suspended in 1994 because of Maikovskis' failing health. Maikovskis died two years later.

Another well-known case that Welles assisted with was the extradition of Josef Schwammberger, a Nazi labor camp commander, from Argentina where he had been living for at least 40 years.
