= Herbert Kickl =

Austrian politician (born 1968)

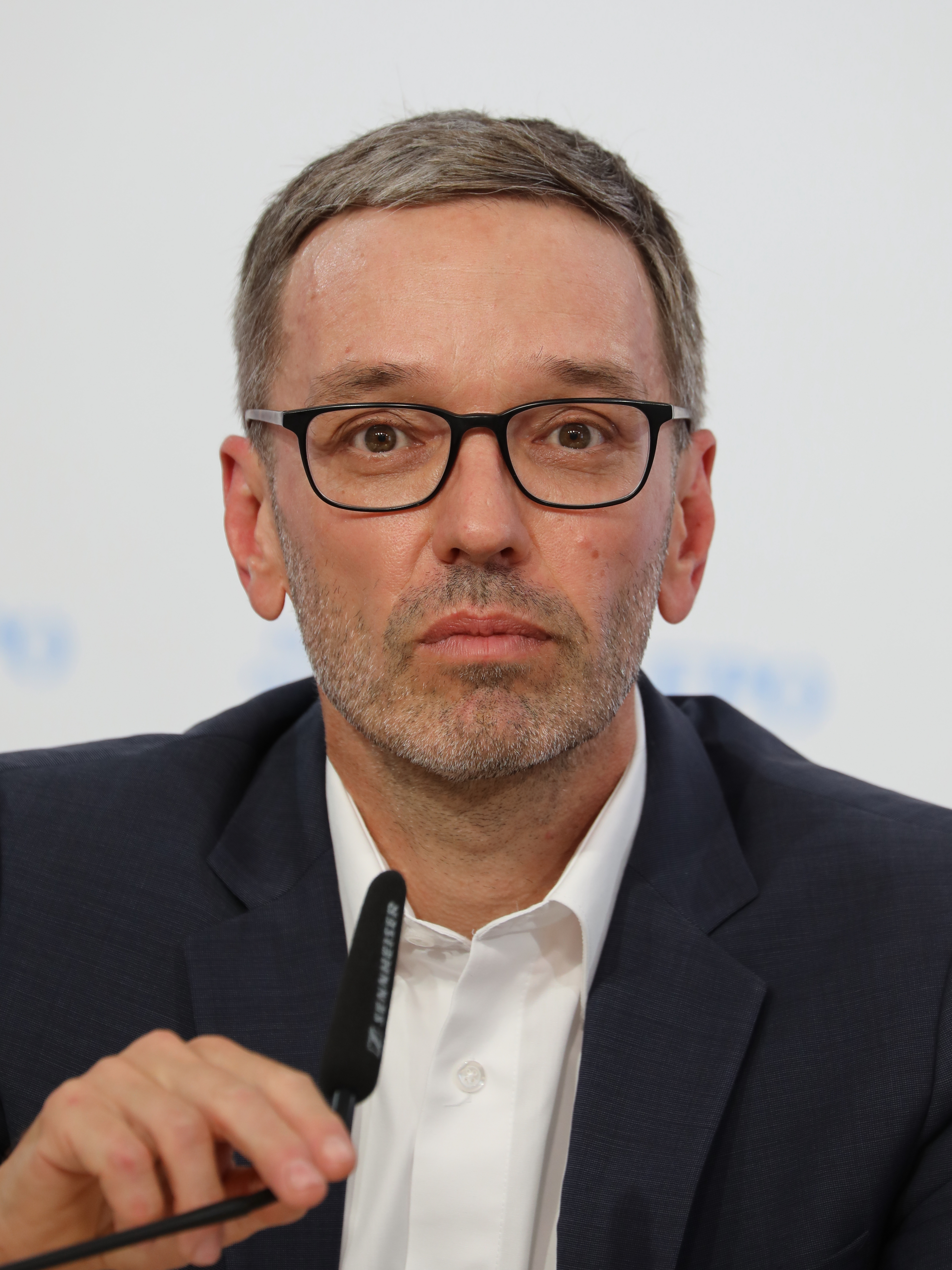
- Kickl in 2020

Chair of the Freedom Party
- Incumbent
- Assumed office 7 June 2021
- Preceded by: Norbert Hofer

Minister of the Interior
- In office 18 December 2017 – 22 May 2019
- Chancellor: Sebastian Kurz
- Preceded by: Wolfgang Sobotka
- Succeeded by: Eckart Ratz

General Secretary of the Freedom Party
- In office 23 April 2005 – 12 January 2018 Serving with Karlheinz Klement, Harald Vilimsky
- Preceded by: Uwe Scheuch
- Succeeded by: Marlene Svazek

Member of the National Council
- Incumbent
- Assumed office 23 October 2019
- Nominated by: Norbert Hofer
- Affiliation: Freedom Party
- In office 24 May 2019 – 22 October 2019
- Constituency: 3 – Lower Austria
- In office 30 October 2006 – 18 December 2017
- Nominated by: Heinz-Christian Strache
- Affiliation: Freedom Party

Personal details
- Born: 19 October 1968 (age 58) Villach, Carinthia, Austria
- Party: Freedom Party
- Children: 1
- Education: University of Vienna (no degree)

Herbert Kickl (born 19 October 1968) is an Austrian politician who has been leader of the far-right Freedom Party of Austria (FPÖ) since June 2021. He previously served as minister of the interior from 2017 to 2019 and general-secretary of the FPÖ from 2005 to 2018. In the 2024 Austrian legislative election, the FPÖ became Austria's strongest party for the first time in history. Kickl negotiated with the Austrian People's Party in early 2025 but was unable to form a government. He is the leader of the opposition in the National Council. Kickl advocates a Fortress Austria and remigration. Some political analysts believe he has radicalized his party.

Kickl rose to prominence as a campaign director for the FPÖ and speechwriter for Jörg Haider during the 2000s. After the party split in 2005, he became general-secretary and one of its key leaders. In 2017, he was appointed federal Minister for the Interior in the first Kurz government. In February 2018, he ordered a controversial raid on the Federal Office for the Protection of the Constitution and Counterterrorism, seizing their data on right-wing extremist groups including the new right Identitarian Movement of Austria close to the FPÖ. He was dismissed from office in May 2019 in the wake of the Ibiza affair, though he was not personally implicated. He returned to the National Council, where he has been leader of the FPÖ faction since 2019.

== Early life and education ==
Born in Villach, Carinthia, southern Austria, Kickl grew up in a working-class family and attended primary school in Radenthein. His parents, Andreas and Herta, both worked for the RHI Magnesita. Kickl graduated from grammar school in Spittal an der Drau and did his military service with the mountain troops as a one-year volunteer from 1987 to 1988. He then began studying journalism and political science at the University of Vienna, and from 1989, philosophy and history. He didn't complete either degree.

== Political career ==
Between 1995 and 2001, Kickl worked for the FPÖ's party academy in the area of campaign strategy and content, rising to deputy executive director in 2001. After the Knittelfeld Putsch in 2002, he became executive director, a position he held until 2006. In this capacity, he was a speechwriter for long-time FPÖ leader Jörg Haider. Among other things, he wrote inflammatory statements about French president Jacques Chirac and Jewish Community of Vienna president Ariel Muzicant, and was responsible for controversial campaign slogans such as the 2010 Viennese state election slogan "Viennese blood - too much foreign is not good for anyone."

After Haider left the party in 2005 and launched the Alliance for the Future of Austria, Kickl remained with FPÖ and became one of his harshest critics. In the aftermath, Kickl was elected general-secretary of the FPÖ and director of the party newspaper Neue Freie Zeitung, positions which he held until 2018 and 2017 respectively. As general-secretary he was responsible for public relations and internal communication, and was considered the chief strategist of the FPÖ and the "right-hand man" of leader Heinz-Christian Strache. He was elected to the National Council in 2006 and served as deputy chair of the FPÖ parliamentary faction. From 2016 to 2021, he was president of the FPÖ Education Institute.

=== Minister for the Interior (2017-2019) ===
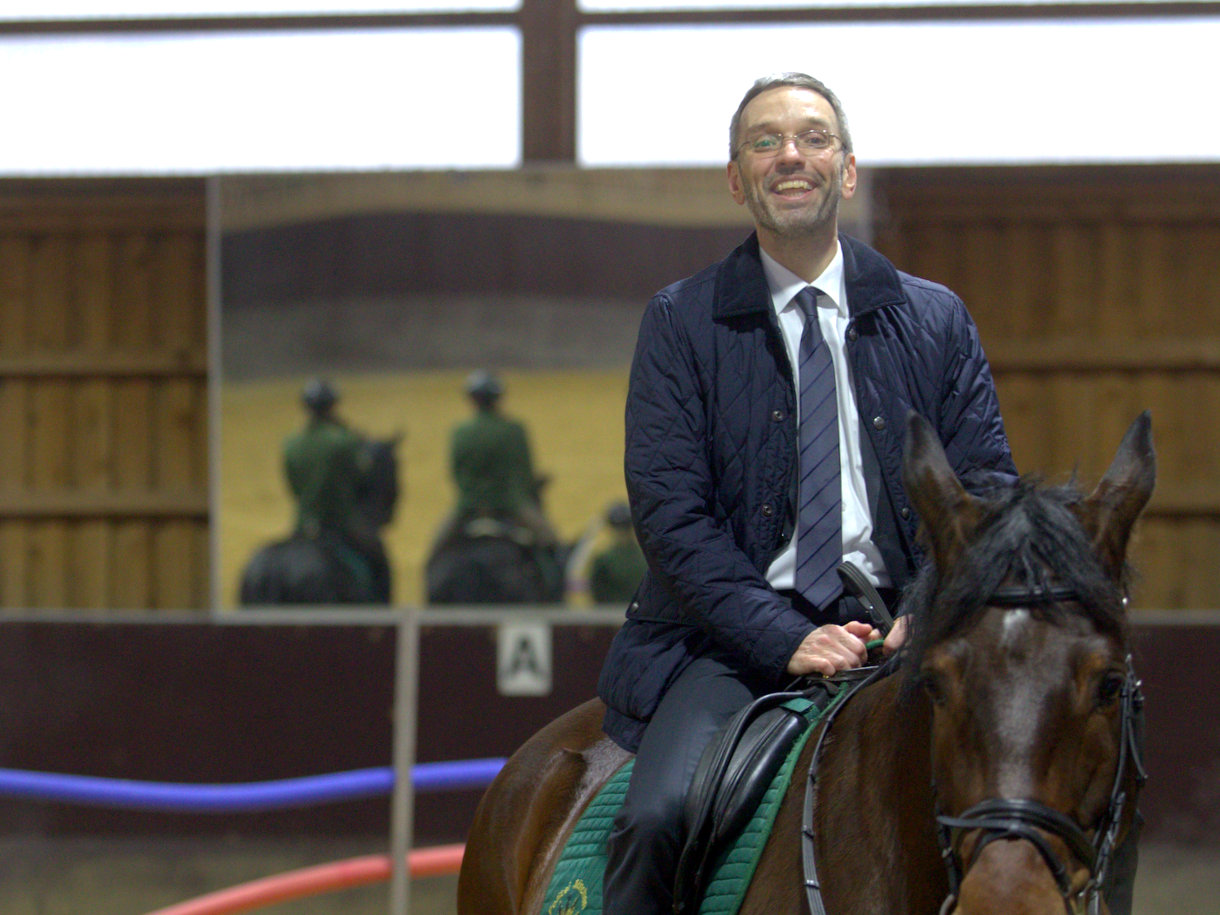
Kickl riding a horse in 2018

After the 2017 Austrian legislative election, the FPÖ joined the federal government as a junior partner to the Austrian People's Party (ÖVP). Kickl was sworn in as Federal Minister for the Interior on 17 December. In this capacity, he was embroiled in a number of scandals. He was accused of failing to take serious responsibility as a minister, instead acting as if he were still in the opposition, as well as misusing his office and fostering a development away from liberal democracy and the rule of law.

In a press conference on 11 January 2018, Kickl said he wanted "services centres and infrastructure that would allow the authorities to concentrate asylum seekers in one place", which was widely interpreted as an allusion to concentration camps, though he denied that the phrasing was intentional or that he sought to be provocative.

In March 2018, Kickl suspended Peter Gridling, head of the Federal Office for the Protection of the Constitution and Counterterrorism (BVT), and ordered raids against its offices and the homes of a number of staff, seizing nineteen gigabytes of data. Kickl claimed that his actions were necessitated by Gridling and the agency's failure to delete sensitive data. His actions were criticised by opposition politicians, who accused him of seeking to undermine the independence of the BVT and to protect right-wing extremist groups close to the FPÖ. President of Austria Alexander Van der Bellen described the events as "extremely unusual and disconcerting". Government spokesman for security Werner Amon stated that the interior ministry had failed to work through the proper channels, and that unprompted searches of staff members' homes was not normal procedure.

Kickl was criticised in September 2018 after an email addressed to the police by his ministerial spokesman surfaced recommending that they limit contact with critical media outlets to a bare minimum. This prompted criticism from Chancellor Sebastian Kurz, who condemned "any restriction of freedom of the press". Kickl stated he did not approve of the email's content, and the FPÖ accused the media of conducting a coordinated witch hunt against him. Kickl has also been accused of wielding the police for political purposes, lodging legal complaints against individuals and journalists who write negatively about him.

In January 2019, Kickl voiced his demand for faster deportation of refugees who had committed crimes, stating that deportation should be possible immediately after conviction, before full legal process has been completed. He later corrected his position, stating that the full legal process should be carried out before deportation, but further said: "I believe that it is up to the law to follow politics, and not for politics to follow the law." He questioned the necessity of human rights agreements, including the European Convention on Human Rights, claiming that they "prevent us from doing what is necessary". He received widespread criticism for his statements which were perceived as an attack against the rule of law, including from ÖVP members of the government, President Van der Bellen, various judges' and lawyers' associations, and president of the Jewish Community of Vienna Oskar Deutsch.

In early 2019, Kickl proposed to amend the constitution to allow preventive detention of asylum seekers who could be considered a threat to public safety. NEOS leader Beate Meinl-Reisinger refused to consider discussions for such an amendment, criticising detention based purely on potential danger as a feature of authoritarian regimes. Kickl also proposed a curfew for asylum seekers between 10 PM and 6 AM on a voluntary basis and commented: "If they don't want to do that, we will find a place for them where there is little incentive to hang around." He stated that the aim of a renewed tightening of asylum law was to make it virtually impossible to apply for asylum in Austria. He also announced that reception centres for refugees would be renamed to "departure centres" from March, a move which social psychologist Klaus Ottomeyer described as "pure sadism".

As interior minister, Kickl pushed to expand and strengthen the Federal Police. The programme of the ÖVP–FPÖ government included plans to hire 4,100 new police officers. In April 2018, the ministry announced that the special Vienna standby police unit would be permitted to use tasers, similar to other special units. In August, Kickl announced plans to establish standby units in all nine states. Further, a new border protection unit named Puma was established. The government also launched a pilot program to introduce mounted police, which was unsuccessful. Expenses for the project amounted to around €2.5 million, according to the Kurier.

==== Dismissal ====
On 17 May 2019, a secretly-recorded video featuring FPÖ politicians Heinz-Christian Strache and Johann Gudenus was released to the press. In the video, both men appear receptive to proposals by a woman calling herself Alyona Makarova, posing as a niece of Russian businessman Igor Makarov, who suggests providing their party with positive news coverage in return for government contracts. Strache and Gudenus also hint at corrupt practices involving other wealthy donors to the FPÖ in Europe and elsewhere. After the story broke, then-Vice-Chancellor Strache announced his resignation from all political offices.

According to Chancellor Sebastian Kurz, as general-secretary of the FPÖ, Kickl was primarily responsible for the party's financial management. He stated it would therefore be inappropriate for the interior ministry, which would conduct the investigation into the scandal, to be overseen by Kickl. For this reason, and because in Kurz's view he had not taken the severity of the situation seriously, he requested that President Alexander Van der Bellen dismiss Kickl as interior minister. He was dismissed on 22 May. Kickl thus became the first federal minister in the Second Republic to be removed from office against his will. In response, the remaining FPÖ ministers resigned and the party withdrew from the coalition, prompting Kurz to call a snap election.

=== FPÖ parliamentary leader ===
Kickl resumed his seat in the National Council on 24 May and became managing officer of the FPÖ parliamentary faction. He was re-elected in the September election. Kickl received over 75,000 personal votes, the second-highest number of any candidate behind only Sebastian Kurz, and more than twice as many as FPÖ top candidate and leader Norbert Hofer. He became chairman of the FPÖ faction after the election.

Kickl and Hofer were considered unofficial "dual leaders" and often came into conflict. While Hofer sought to take a moderate line, Kickl positioned himself as "the true party leader" and pushed for hardline stances on a number of issues. He took a strict position against the government's response to the COVID-19 pandemic, spreading misinformation, opposing vaccination, and attending anti-lockdown protests. He was criticised by Hofer over his refusal to wear a mask in the National Council.

=== FPÖ chairman (2021–present) ===
In May 2021, Kickl voiced his desire to run as lead candidate for the FPÖ in the next federal election. On 1 June, Hofer announced his resignation as party chairman. Kickl was the sole candidate to succeed him. He was unanimously designated as chairman by the executive committee on 7 June and confirmed on 19 June with 88% support.

In the 2024 Austrian legislative election held on 29 September, the FPÖ gained a plurality of seats in the National Council, the Party's support increased from 16% to 28.85% of the vote, placing first and achieving its best result in the party's history. However, no party in parliament agreed to form a coalition with it or agree to have Kickl become Chancellor, which led to President Alexander Van der Bellen asking outgoing chancellor Karl Nehammer of the ÖVP to form a new government on 22 October. In response, Kickl criticised Van der Bellen for breaking with the "tried and tested normal processes" of asking the leading party in the election to form a government and pledged that "Today is not the end of the story". Since then, the party has rapidly surged upwards, reaching 35-37% in different polls from December 2024.

After Nehammer failed to form a government and resigned as chancellor in January 2025, Kickl received a mandate from Van der Bellen to form the next government on 6 January. However, Kickl was also unable to form a government and returned his mandate on 12 February.

== Political positions ==
Kickl has been called a far-right politician.

During government formation with the ÖVP in 2017, Kickl stated that his goal in politics was to "make society more fair". Society is fair, he said, when one can support one's family through gainful employment and live a self-determined life without "social dependence".

Kickl attracted attention in 2016 as the keynote speaker of the "Defenders of Europe" conference in Linz, which was organised and attended by various far-right, antisemitic, and racist groups and figures, including far-right media outlets such as Compact and both Austrian and German neo-Nazi groups. The Wiener Zeitung described it as an attempt to blur the boundaries between the Neue Rechte, right-wing populism, and classical right-wing extremism.

Kickl has since maintained ties with many of the same groups. In 2018, he opposed moves by the FPÖ to distance itself from the ethno-nationalist Identitarian movement; subsequently, during the 2019 election, Identitarian leader Martin Sellner bought advertisements encouraging preferential votes for Kickl. In June 2021, he described the Identitarian Movement as "an interesting project, worthy of support", and in 2023 reiterated his opposition to a "red line" against them. During the COVID-19 pandemic, he regularly attended and spoke at rallies alongside far-right activists, including neo-Nazi Gottfried Küssel.

During the 2024 federal campaign, Kickl styled himself as "Volkskanzler" (People's Chancellor), a term also used around 1933 by the Nazi Party in reference to Adolf Hitler. Kickl has denied the connection. He has also described the other political parties as "system parties", a term also associated with the Nazis.

=== Immigration and multiculturalism ===
Like most in his party, Kickl strongly opposes immigration and what he describes as "the abuse of the asylum system". He believes that Islam has no place in Europe, and that integration of Muslim immigrants cannot "solve the problem of Islamic countercultures". Rather, immigration must be severely limited. He has called for "a total ban on the hijab in public space". As interior minister, he advocated for rapid deportation of refugees who commit crimes. He also suggested that Austria should withdraw from human rights agreements if they "prevent us from doing what is necessary", expressing his belief that "it is up to the law to follow politics, and not for politics to follow the law." He stated that the aim of his refugee policy was to make it virtually impossible to apply for asylum in Austria.

Kickl is an advocate for remigration, which he and the FPÖ define as the deportation of immigrants and their descendants, including citizens, who refuse to integrate. In June 2024 he called for the European Union to establish a "remigration commissioner". Kickl's 2024 federal election campaign focused heavily on opposing immigration and advocating remigration, in order to restore the "homogeneous" nature of the Austrian people; Kickl had been calling for a "Fortress Austria" since 2023.

=== Foreign policy ===
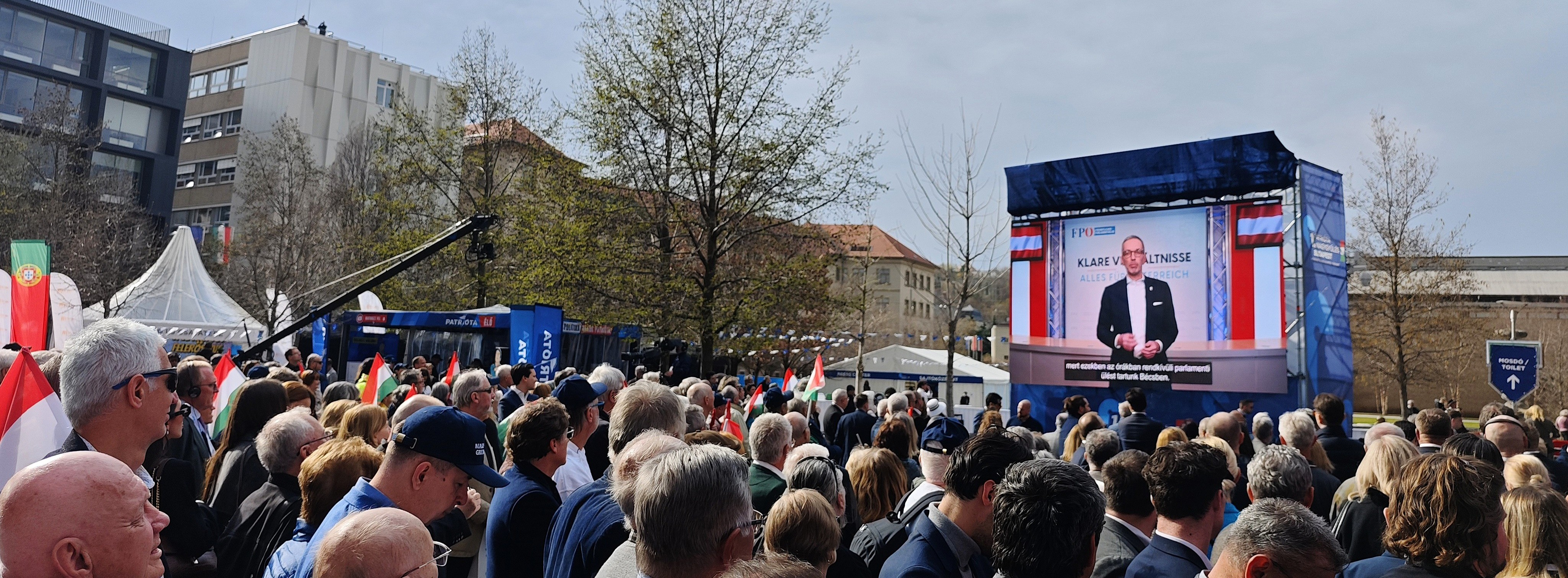
Speaking at 1st Patriots' Grand Assembly - Budapest

Kickl has praised the President of the United States Donald Trump, Former Prime Minister of Hungary Viktor Orbán (Fidesz), the Prime Minister of the Czech Republic, Andrej Babiš, the leaders of the Alternative for Germany, Alice Weidel and Tino Chrupalla, Dutch politician Geert Wilders (PVV), Italian politician Matteo Salvini (Lega) and French politician Marine Le Pen (National Rally).

==== Views on Russia and Russian invasion of Ukraine ====
He supports his party's close relations with the President of Russia Vladimir Putin and United Russia. As interior minister in 2018, Kickl sought cooperation with the Russian government on disaster responses and the fight against organised crime and terrorism. In a radio interview, Kickl rejected criticism of the Russian president's authoritarian policies. After the 2022 Russian invasion of Ukraine, he claimed that both Russia and NATO bore responsibility for the invasion, and that sanctions imposed against Russia constituted a violation of Austrian neutrality. He also opposed plans for Austria to accept Ukrainian refugees. In March 2023, Kickl and the FPÖ walked out of parliament during an address by Ukrainian president Volodymyr Zelenskyy. Throughout the year, he continued to call for the lifting of sanctions against Russia.

In June 2025, Herbert Kickl publicly expressed his outrage over Zelensky's alleged visit to Austria. This was a "foreign policy blunder" that, in his opinion, "makes Austria a potential target in the event of an escalation."

=== COVID-19 ===
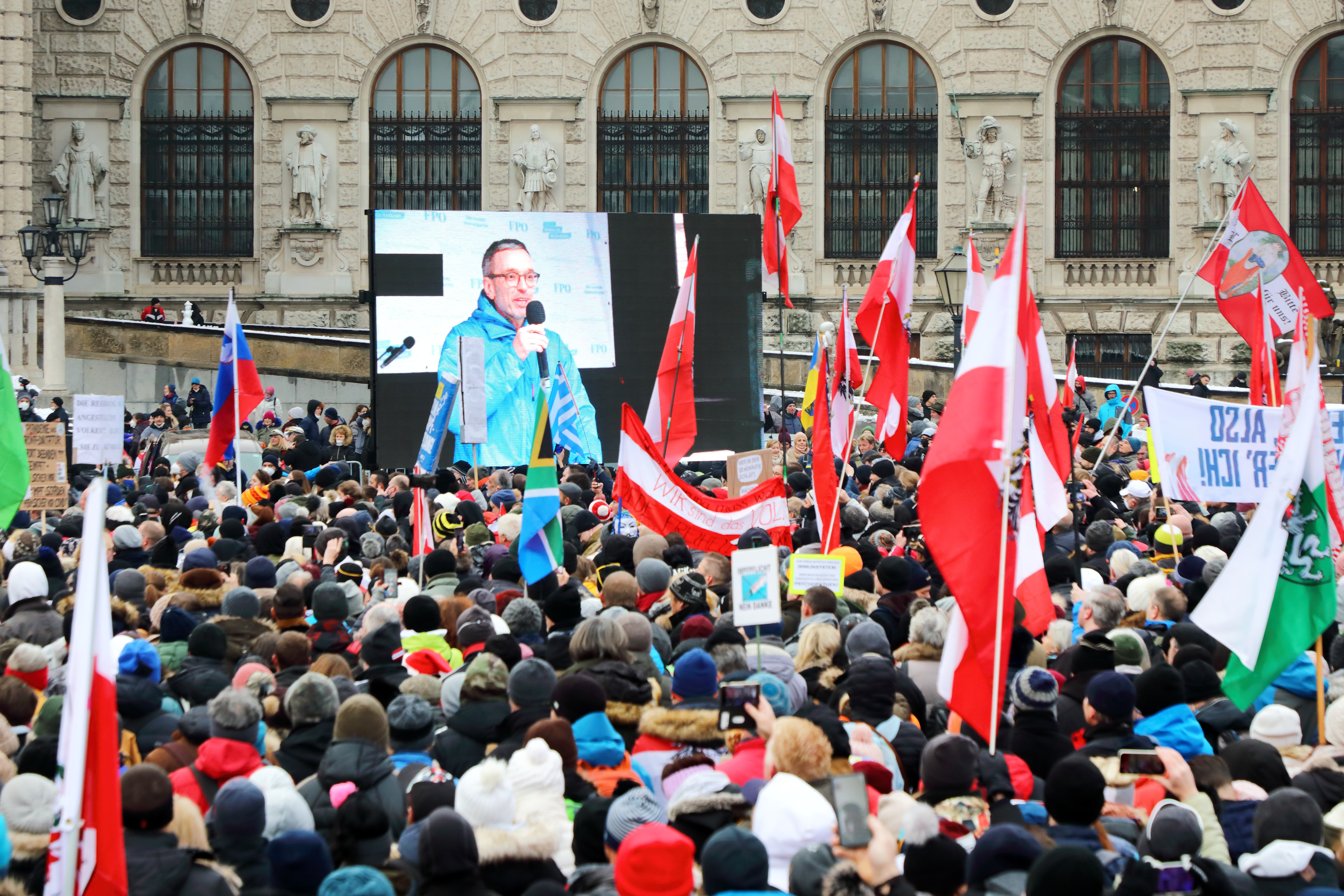
Kickl as speaker at the demonstration against COVID-19 restrictions on 11 December 2021 in Vienna

Kickl has attended and spoken at protests against the Austrian COVID-19 response, which he characterises as "a game of power" by "those at the top [who] want to dominate us". He opposes the use of COVID-19 vaccine, describing the mass vaccination campaign in Israel as "health apartheid". He refused to condemn actions which liken pandemic measures to the Holocaust, such as anti-vaccine protesters wearing Jewish badges, and denied that he was trivialising the crimes of the Nazi regime.

In April 2021, Kickl voiced his refusal to wear a mask in the National Council after a mandate was introduced. However, as the policy was part of the house rules rather than the parliamentary rules of procedure, there was no punishment for failing to observe it. Kickl said he was therefore not obliged to do so, as he is when shopping. He said he was "not one of those hypocrites who puts on the mask and then throws every security measure overboard".

== Personal life ==
Kickl is married to a lawyer and has a son. They live in Purkersdorf.
