= Vienna Philharmonic =

Orchestra based in Vienna, Austria

- Orchestra
- Native name: Wiener Philharmoniker
- Founded: 1842
- Location: Vienna, Austria
- Concert hall: Musikverein
- Website: WienerPhilharmoniker.at

Vienna Philharmonic (VPO; German: Wiener Philharmoniker) is an orchestra that was founded in 1842 and has been considered to be one of the finest in the world.

The Vienna Philharmonic is based at the Musikverein in Vienna, Austria. Its members are selected from the orchestra of the Vienna State Opera. Selection involves a lengthy process, with each musician demonstrating their capability for a minimum of three years' performance for the opera and ballet. After this probationary period, the musician may request an application for a position in the orchestra from the Vienna Philharmonic's board. The Vienna Philharmonic hires no musician over 35 years of age, and has a mandatory retirement age of 65; 30 years of service are required for full pension.

== History ==
=== Precursors and formation ===
Until the 1830s, orchestral performance in Vienna was done by ad hoc orchestras, consisting of professional and (often) amateur musicians brought together for specific performances. In 1833, Franz Lachner formed the forerunner of the Vienna Philharmonic, the Künstlerverein – an orchestra of professional musicians from the Vienna Court Opera (Wiener Hofoper, now the Vienna State Opera); it gave four concerts, each including a Beethoven symphony. The Vienna Philharmonic itself arose nine years later, in 1842, hatched by a group who met regularly at the inn 'Zum Amor', including the poet Nikolaus Lenau, newspaper editor August Schmidt, critic Alfred Becker, violinist Karlz Holz, Count Laurecin, and composer Otto Nicolai who was also the principal conductor of a standing orchestra at a Viennese theater. Mosco Carner wrote in The New Grove Dictionary of Music and Musicians that "Nicolai was the least enthusiastic about the idea, and had to be persuaded by the others; he conducted the first [concert] on 28 March 1842." The orchestra was fully independent, consisted of members of the Hofoper orchestra, and made all of its decisions by a democratic vote of its members; it had its day-to-day management handled by a democratically elected body, the administrative committee.

Nicolai and the orchestra gave only 11 concerts in the ensuing five years, and when Nicolai left Vienna in 1847, the orchestra nearly folded (New Grove notes the disruption caused by the Revolution of 1848 as a hindrance). Between 1854 and 1857, Karl Eckert – the first permanent conductor of the Vienna Court Opera (Wiener Hofoper)– led the (associated) Vienna Philharmonic in a few concerts. In 1857, Eckert was made Director of the Hofoper – the first musician to have been given the post; in 1860, he conducted four subscription concerts of the Vienna Philharmonic. Since that time, writes Vienna Philharmonic violinist and president Clemens Hellsberg, "the 'Philharmonic Concerts' have been staged without interruption."

=== The era of subscription conductors: 1860–1933 ===
In 1860, the orchestra elected Otto Dessoff to be the permanent conductor. According to Max Kalbeck, the Vienna-based music critic, newspaper editor, and biographer, the fame and excellence of the Vienna Philharmonic resulted from Dessoff's "energy and sense of purpose." Clemens Hellsberg gives specifics, writing that during the Dessoff years, the Vienna Philharmonic's "repertoire was consistently enlarged, important organizational principles (music archives, rules of procedure) were introduced and the orchestra moved to its third new home [in 1870], the newly built Goldener Saal in the Musikverein building in Vienna [in which it still performs], which has proved to be the ideal venue, with its acoustical characteristics influencing the orchestra's style and sound." After fifteen years, in 1875, Dessoff was "pushed out of his position in Vienna through intrigue", and he left Vienna to become conductor (Hofkapellmeister) of the Badische Staatskapelle in Karlsruhe, Germany. In Karlsruhe the next year, he fulfilled the request of his friend Johannes Brahms to conduct the first performance of his Symphony no. 1; in 1873, Brahms had conducted the premiere of his Variations on a Theme by Haydn with Dessoff's Vienna Philharmonic.

In 1875, the orchestra chose Hans Richter to take Dessoff's place as subscription conductor. He remained until 1898, except for the season 1882/1883, when he was in dispute with the orchestral committee (during this hiatus, Wilhelm Jahn of the Vienna Court Opera served as subscription conductor). Richter led the VPO in the world premieres of Brahms's Second Symphony (in 1877), Tragic Overture (in 1880), and Symphony no. 3 (in 1883), the Violin Concerto of Tchaikovsky (in 1881), and in 1892 the 8th symphony of Anton Bruckner. It was Richter who in 1881 appointed Arnold Rosé as concertmaster, who was to become Gustav Mahler's brother-in-law and was concertmaster until the Anschluss in 1938. In order to be eligible for a pension, Richter intended to remain in his position for 25 years (to 1900), and he might have done so, given that the orchestra unanimously re-elected him in May 1898. But he resigned on 22 September, citing health reasons, although biographer Christopher Fifield argues that the real reasons were that he wanted to tour, and that "he was uneasy as claques in the audience formed in favour of Gustav Mahler" (who was triumphing as director of the Hofoper). Richter recommended Mahler or Ferdinand Löwe to the orchestra as his replacement.

In 1898, on 24 September, the orchestra elected Gustav Mahler. (On 30 May 1899, pro-Mahler and pro-Richter factions had a "heated committee meeting"; matters were finally resolved in August when Richter wrote to his supporters "gently refusing their offer".) Under Mahler's baton, the Vienna Philharmonic played abroad for the first time at the 1900 Paris World Exposition. While Mahler had strong supporters in the orchestra, he faced dissension from other orchestral members (an unreconstructed pro-Richter faction plus an anti-Semitic one, according to Jens Malte Fischer), criticism of his re-touchings of Beethoven, and arguments with the orchestra and over new policies he imposed; ultimately, "his working relationship with the Vienna Philharmonic continued to be fueled by resentment and broke down completely in November 1900". He resigned on 1 April 1901, citing health concerns as a pretext, like Richter, but continuing to conduct actively elsewhere (he remained director of the associated Hofoper until 1907).

In 1901, Joseph Hellmesberger, Jr. briefly took his place; he remained only until 1903.

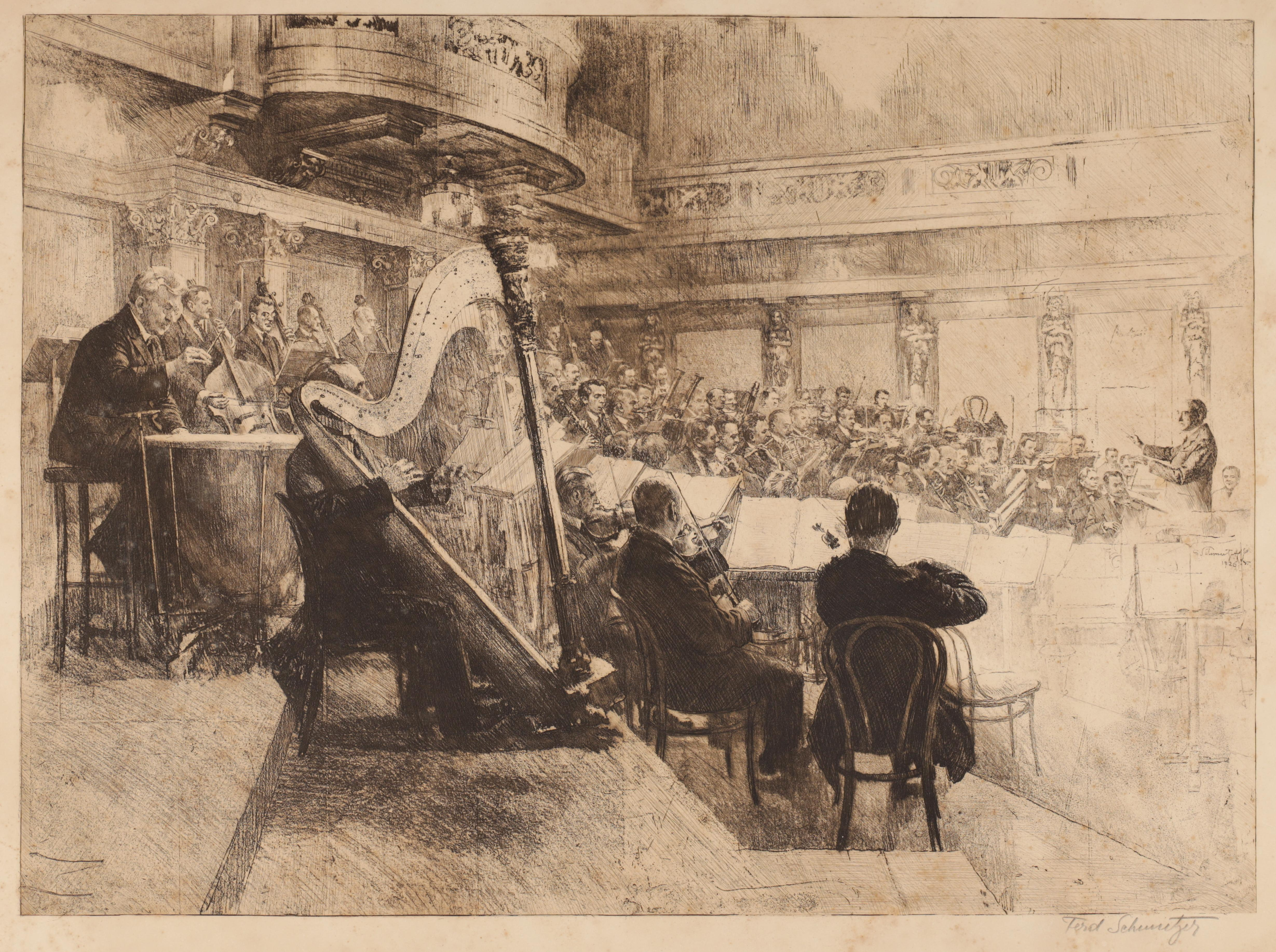
Vienna Philharmonic at the rehearsal, Felix Weingartner is conducting. Engraving by Ferdinand Schmutzer (1926)

In 1908, after an interval with no official subscription conductor, the orchestra elected Felix Weingartner to the post; he was to remain in it until 1927, and conducted at least 432 concerts with them in total, including the VPO's first tour of South America in 1922. Weingartner's interpretive stance was opposite to Mahler's (Mahler employed marked tempo fluctuations in Beethoven, whereas Weingartner decried "tempo rubato conductors"); but like Mahler, he considered himself primarily a composer, and between 1910 and 1923 led the orchestra in at least one piece of his own music per season. He was most renowned for his Beethoven – he programmed at least two symphonies per season, and complete cycles in 1916/17 and 1926/27. It was Weingartner who led the orchestra's first concert devoted to entirely to the music of Johann Strauss, Jr. (for the composer's centennial), on 25 October 1925.

In 1927, when Weingartner resigned, the orchestra elected Wilhelm Furtwängler. He resigned at the end of the 1929/30 season because of increased professional demands in Berlin.

In 1930, the orchestra chose Clemens Krauss for the position. At the Salzburg Festival in the summers of 1929–33 he led the orchestra in an annual Strauss waltz concert, the forerunners of the New Year's Day concerts he was later to institute. Krauss left in 1933 to become director of the Berlin State Opera (after Erich Kleiber resigned that position to protest Nazi rule).

=== 1933 through 1945 ===
Since 1933, the orchestra has had no single subscription conductor, but according to New Grove (vol. 19, p. 723), "between 1933 and 1938, Bruno Walter and Wilhelm Furtwängler shared the Philharmonic concerts between them, and during the Nazi period Furtwängler was the permanent conductor"; by contrast, the Vienna Philharmonic's website history says, "Furtwängler was in actuality the main conductor of the orchestra from 1933 to 1945, and again from 1947 to 1954." In support of New Grove's assertion of Walter's role, it might be noted that he made Vienna his home from 1933 until 1938 (after being driven from Germany by the Third Reich), was artistic director of the Vienna State Opera from 1936 until 1938, and conducted the Vienna Philharmonic frequently, making a number of major recordings with the orchestra (including Richard Wagner's Die Walküre act 1 and parts of act 2, the first recordings of Mahler's Das Lied von der Erde and of his Symphony No. 9, and numerous symphonic recordings) and taking the orchestra on tour to England and France in 1935. In support of the VPO website, Otto Strasser (who played in the orchestra from 1922 until 1967 and was the VPO chairman who procured Furtwängler's wartime services) said, Furtwängler "influenced us so much that we became the true 'Furtwängler orchestra'."

Other conductors who worked with the orchestra in the mid-1930s before the Anschluss included Arturo Toscanini, Weingartner, Hans Knappertsbusch, Otto Klemperer, Adrian Boult, Victor de Sabata and George Szell. Walter conducted the last concert before the Anschluss, on 20 February 1938, featuring the world premiere of Egon Wellesz's Prosperos Beschwörungen and Anton Bruckner's Symphony No. 4.

After the Anschluss and during World War II the roster included Furtwängler, Krauss, Knappertsbusch, Willem Mengelberg, and Karl Böhm. The orchestra's history during this period has been a topic of ongoing discussion and research, including a large amount commissioned by the orchestra (see below, "#Period under National Socialism").

=== Post-World War II era to present ===
In 1946, when these conductors were undergoing denazification – successfully in the case of Furtwängler, unsuccessfully in the case of Mengelberg – the orchestra was led primarily by conductors untainted by Nazi association, including Josef Krips, Erich Leinsdorf, Volkmar Andreae, Paul Paray, and Charles Munch. An exception was Herbert von Karajan, who made his debut with the orchestra with two concerts in January, but was unable to conduct a third scheduled concert when occupying authorities required him to undergo denazification (his tribunal in Vienna was in February, 1947). After clearance, he resumed conducting in late 1947 and developed a significant association with the orchestra (more below).

In 1947, Bruno Walter reunited with the orchestra as conductor when it appeared at the first Edinburgh Festival. They performed a single work, Mahler's song cycle Das Lied von der Erde.

In the postwar era, dozens of the world's best-known conductors have led the orchestra. Among them were not only Walter, Furtwängler, Knappertsbusch, Krauss, Szell, Klemperer, and Krips, but also John Barbirolli, Carlo Maria Giulini, Erich Kleiber, James Levine, Zubin Mehta, Fritz Reiner, Georg Solti, Claudio Abbado, Riccardo Muti, Nikolaus Harnoncourt, Lorin Maazel, Mariss Jansons, Daniel Barenboim, Gustavo Dudamel, Roberto Carnevale, Valery Gergiev and Franz Welser-Möst. The orchestra made their first US tour in 1956 under the batons of Carl Schuricht and André Cluytens. Three conductors were given honorific titles by the orchestra in the later 20th century: Karajan and Karl Böhm, who were made Honorary Conductors, and Leonard Bernstein, who was made an Honorary Member of the orchestra. Pierre Boulez, who had conducted the orchestra often, was made an Honorary Member in 2007. Another significant relationship was with the famously reclusive conductor Carlos Kleiber, who appeared with the orchestra first in 1974 and last in 1994, his longest association with any ensemble, even if it included only 30 appearances; Clemens Hellsberg wrote of the "contrast between those dry numbers and the defining experience which each encounter with this brilliant interpreter represented." Finally, István Kertész' gramophone recordings with the Vienna Philharmonic during the 1960s and the 1970s represent a highlight in the orchestra's history.

On 7 May 2000, the orchestra performed Beethoven's Ninth Symphony at the site of the concentration camp at Mauthausen, Austria, in commemoration of the 50th anniversary of its liberation. Simon Rattle conducted, and soloists were Ruth Ziesak, Angelika Kirchschlager, Vinson Cole, and Thomas Quasthoff; all artists and the orchestra performed without fee and without applause at the end. The symphony was preceded by recitation of the Kaddish, the prayer of mourning, by Paul Chaim Eisenberg, the Chief Rabbi of Austria, and the funeral prayer El male rachamim sung by Shmuel Barzilai, the chief cantor of the Israelitische Kultusgemeinde Wien (Viennese Israelite Community), accompanied by members of the orchestra and the Wiener Singverein; the orchestral arrangement was by Erich Schagerl, a violinist in the orchestra.

In 2005 the orchestra was named Goodwill Ambassador of the World Health Organization. In 2013, Clemens Hellsberg received the Marietta and Friedrich Torberg Medal from the Israelitische Kultusgemeinde Wien (Viennese Israelite Community).

Each New Year's Day since 1 January 1941, the VPO has sponsored the Vienna New Year's Concerts, dedicated to the music of the Strauss family composers, and particularly that of Johann Strauss II; the first such concert was given on 31 December 1939 by Clemens Krauss (see below, "#Period under National Socialism"), and led subsequent concerts on New Year's Day from 1941 until 1945. The postwar series of concerts was inaugurated in 1946 by Josef Krips. They were led by Krauss, then by concertmaster Willi Boskovsky from 1955 to 1979, and since 1987 have been led by a variety of leading conductors invited by the orchestra.

== Critical reputation and popularity ==
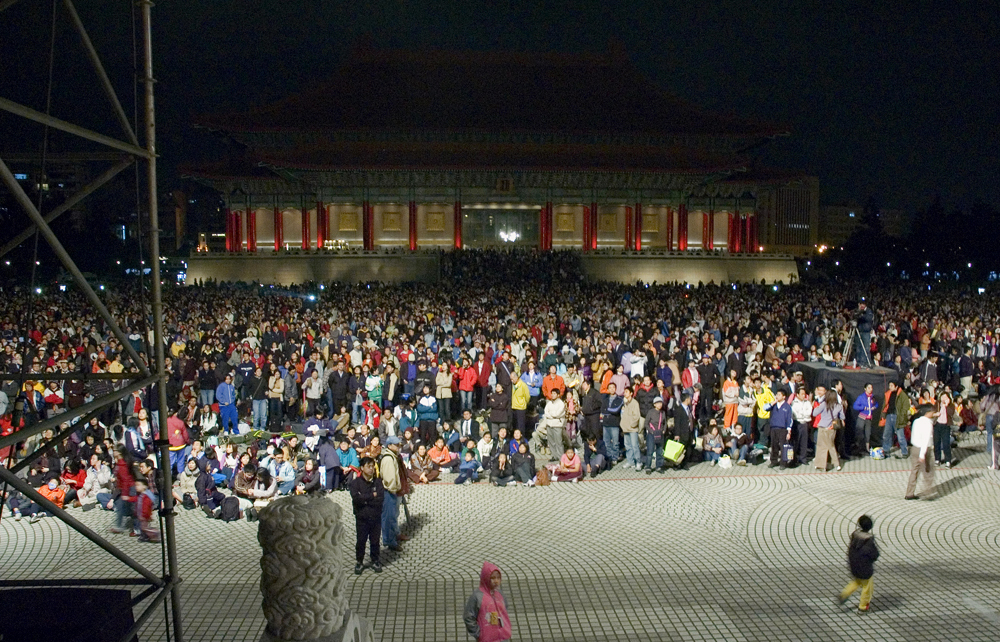
Overflow crowd outside Taiwan's National Concert Hall for a performance by Simon Rattle and the Vienna Philharmonic

In 2006, the Vienna Philharmonic was chosen as Europe's finest orchestra in a survey of seven leading trade publications, two radio stations and a daily newspaper. In 2008, an international jury of music critics polled by the British Gramophone magazine ranked it third in the world (after the Royal Concertgebouw Orchestra and Berlin Philharmonic).

Subscription ticket demand for the Vienna Philharmonic at their home, Musikverein, is currently listed on the orchestra's website as being subject to a waiting list—six years for weekday concert subscriptions, and thirteen years for weekend subscriptions. Casual tickets however, are available in small numbers and can be bought via links from the official website, to various ticket resellers.

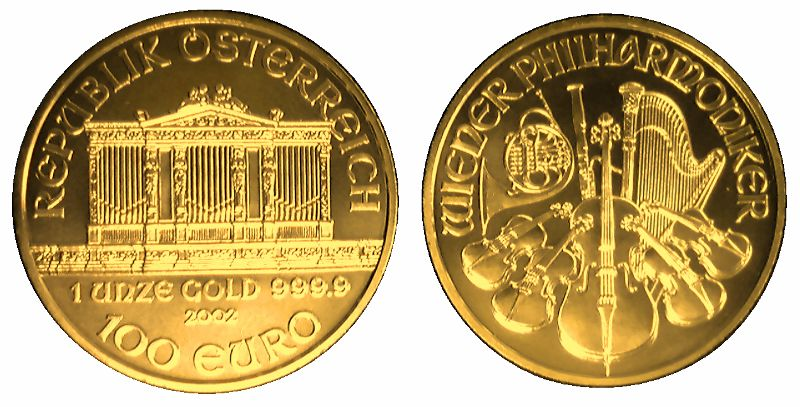
The Wiener Philharmoniker Gold coin

The orchestra has been the motive of one of the world's most famous bullion coins: the Vienna Philharmonic coin. The coin is struck in pure gold, 999.9 fine (24 carats). It is issued every year, in four different face values, sizes and weights. It is used as an investment product, although it finishes almost always in the hands of collectors. According to the World Gold Council, this coin was the best selling gold coin in 1992, 1995 and 1996 worldwide.

In 2006 Austrian Airlines was outfitted with a livery featuring the gold coin and logo of the Wiener Philharmoniker. The long-range Airbus A340 aircraft was flown primarily between Vienna and Tokyo for approximately one year serving as promotional tool for the orchestra and the Philharmoniker, 24 karat gold coin issued by the Austrian Mint.

The orchestra has had an annual ball called the Vienna Philharmonic Ball since 1924, when Richard Strauss began his conducting association.

== Business structure ==
The Vienna Philharmonic operates under what it calls "Democratic Self-Administration". Whereas many orchestras are run under a more corporate model with musicians as labor that works for the orchestra management, the ruling body of the Vienna Philharmonic organization is the full orchestra membership. Day-to-day decisions are delegated to the twelve elected members of the administrative committee.

The Vienna Philharmonic has been officially recognised as an incorporated association since 1908.

== Sound, instruments, and playing style ==
The Vienna Philharmonic was already observed to have a characteristic sound by the turn of the last century. Bruno Walter told an interviewer on Austrian Radio in 1960 that hearing the Vienna Philharmonic for the first time in 1897 was for Walter (in Hurwitz's translation): "...a life-altering impression, because it was this sound of the orchestra that I have experienced ever since – I have the feeling: this is the way an orchestra should sound; the way it should play. I had never heard the beauty, this calmness of the sound, that sort of glissando, the manner of vibrato, the string sound, the blend of woodwinds with the strings, with the brass, the balance of the brass in combination with the percussion contributing together to the overall sonority of the orchestra. For me, this impression was definitive, and now I would like to anticipate a point and tell you this: this sound, 1897, is the same today.".

The VPO's sound has been attributed in part to the VPO's instruments and in part to its playing styles.

Instruments: At least a part of the characteristic sound of the Vienna Philharmonic has been attributed to the use of instruments that differ from those used by other major orchestras:

- The orchestra's standard tuning pitch is A^{4}=443 Hz; the tuning standard for A^{4} is generally considered at a frequency of 440 Hz.
- The VPO uses the German-system (Öhler system) clarinet. By comparison, the Boehm-system clarinet is favored in non-German-speaking countries.
- Likewise, while the Heckel bassoon is now the norm for most orchestras around the world, in the VPO the Heckel bassoon is played almost completely without vibrato.
- The rotary-valve trumpet is used, but unlike most other Germanic orchestras the VPO prefers smaller bore rotary trumpets from makers such as Heckel and Lechner.
- Like its counterparts elsewhere in Austria, Germany and Russia, the VPO favors the F bass and B-flat contrabass rotary-valve tuba, whereas the CC piston-valve tuba is preferred in most American and some British orchestras.
- The trombone has a somewhat smaller bore, but this is also true of the trombone used in many German orchestras.
- The timpani have the Schnellar System in which the kettle pushed up as opposed to the head being pulled down. Hans Schnellar was the timpanist in the early 20th century, and personally made these drums. They also use goat skin heads as opposed to calf skin or plastic heads, and manual tuning as opposed to pedal tuning.
- The double bass retains the traditional theater-placement in a row behind the brass. The VPO uses 4- as well as 5-string double basses. The bow is held in a variation of the German bow grip, in which the index and middle fingers are held above the stick so that only they (and not the thumb) apply pressure to the string.
- The Wiener oboe is, along with the Vienna horn (see below), perhaps the most distinctive member of the VPO instrumentarium. It has a special bore, reed and fingering-system and is very different from the otherwise internationally used Conservatoire (French) oboe.
- The Vienna horn in F uses a Pumpenventil. Unlike the rotary valves used on most other orchestral horns, the Pumpenventil contributes to the liquid legato that is one of the trademarks of the Viennese school. The bore of the Vienna horn is also smaller than more modern horns—actually very close to that of the valveless natural horn. The Vienna horn has remained virtually unchanged since the mid-nineteenth century—as a result it is arguably well-suited to the Classical and Romantic repertoire at the core of the VPO's programming.

On the other hand, at least two instruments or instrument families are like those in other orchestras. According to the Vienna Philharmonic's website, "the flute is largely the same as the conventional Böhm flute, which is widely used all over the world. However, it did not replace the wooden flute in Vienna until the 1920s." Also, the Viennese string sound should not be attributed to unique attributes of the instruments, according to the VPO, which writes on its website, "There can be no doubt that the Viennese string instruments themselves, unlike the winds, are not of prime importance in producing the orchestra's unique sound. With a few exceptions, the quality of the instruments of the string section is not particularly outstanding.". To be sure, the instruments are of high quality; Austria's central bank Oesterreichische Nationalbank currently loans four violins made by Antonio Stradivari to the VPO.

The VPO's instruments and their characteristic tone-colors have been the subject of extensive scientific studies by Gregor Widholm and others at the Institute of Music Acoustics (Wiener Klangstil – Viennese Tone Style) at the University of Music and Performing Arts, Vienna. The Vienna Philharmonic's website generalizes about its woodwind and brass instruments in terms of overtones: "With the exception of the flute and, to some extent, the bassoon, the typical differences in tone of Viennese instruments can be described as follows: They are richer in overtones, i.e., the sound tone is brighter."

Playing style: The orchestra in 2004 began offering a summer institute, the International Orchestra Institute Attergau for Wiener Klangstil, to instruct other musicians in the Viennese playing style.

The 1960 Walter interview indicates that the strings' vibrato (as of 1960) was audibly like that of 1897, and also quotes music critic Richard Specht in 1919 writing of "something inimitable in the vibrato and the passionate virtuosity of the violins" of the Vienna Philharmonic.

As for other instruments, using early recordings, the musicologist Robert Philip has documented some changes in how VPO players used vibrato during the mid-20th century, although he also notes differences between the VPO and other orchestras of the era. As was typical of the era, the pre-1945 flutes show "very little vibrato" in recordings "until after World War II... even in the long solo in Mahler's Das Lied von der Erde the flautist [under Bruno Walter in 1936]... plays almost without vibrato" except on "a few long notes [with] a delicate medium-speed vibrato"; but "by the late 1940s the flautists... had adopted a gentle medium-speed vibrato". The oboes before the 1940s show "little or no vibrato," but by the late 1940s "the principal oboist had adopted a very delicate fast vibrato ... but he uses it very sparingly." (The cor anglais is, he notes, even in the late 1940s still played "without any vibrato"). The bassoonists "show virtually no bassoon vibrato up to the 1950s".

The Vienna Philharmonic website states that today, with the flute, "as with all [wind] instruments in the Viennese classics, vibrato is used very sparingly."

Philips notes that by 1931 the Vienna Philharmonic strings were reported to use uniform bowing, which was still unusual in Britain. As for portamento – sliding audibly from one note to another, a prominent effect among pre-war string players – the VPO strings' sliding in the early 1930s "sounds more deliberately expressive, and less a matter of routine, than that of British orchestras. This is partly because of the firmer dynamic shaping of the melodic line, partly because of the warmer and fuller string tone." Further, he hears "strong evidence of a free approach to portamento" – that is, of "different players shifting at different points" within the same phrase (which, he shows, was standard internationally in pre-war orchestral playing). He notices a reduced use of portamento in recordings from 1931 to 1936, but in 1936 also notes that the VPO strings still make "conspicuous" use of portamento in Mozart, where British orchestras by this time were using less of it in Classical-era composers. Finally, he hears a "trend towards greater subtlety in the use of portamento" post-war, with "only discreet portamento" in a recording under Herbert von Karajan in 1949. One useful indication of approaches to vibrato and portamento is the body of recordings left by concertmaster Arnold Rose and his quartet. While not identical in approach to the earlier German playing of Joseph Joachim, they are notably free from the vibrato that became routine in mid 20th-century, and of an older style both in rhythm and use of slides. (E.g., Beethoven Op 131 and the 5th Brahms Hungarian Dance.)

== Controversies ==
=== Orchestral membership of women and non-European ethnicities ===
The Vienna Philharmonic did not accept female musicians to permanent membership until 1997, far later than comparable orchestras (of the other orchestras ranked among the world's top five by Gramophone magazine in 2008, the last to appoint a woman to a permanent position was the Berlin Philharmonic, which did so in 1982) As late as February 1996, first flutist Dieter Flury told Westdeutscher Rundfunk that accepting women would be "gambling with the emotional unity (emotionelle Geschlossenheit) that this organism currently has". In April 1996, the orchestra's press secretary wrote that "compensating for the expected leaves of absence" of maternity leave was a problem that they "do not yet see how to get a grip on" in ongoing consultations with the Women's Ministry of the Austrian Republic about women in the orchestra.

In February 1997, Austrian Chancellor Viktor Klima told the orchestra at an awards ceremony that there was "creative potential in the other half of humanity and this should be used." The orchestra, wrote The New York Times, was "facing protests during a [US] tour" by the National Organization for Women and International Alliance for Women in Music. Finally, "after being held up to increasing ridicule even in socially conservative Austria, members of the orchestra gathered [on 28 February 1997] in an extraordinary meeting on the eve of their departure and agreed to admit a woman, Anna Lelkes, as harpist." According to Lelkes, who had played as an adjunct with the orchestra since 1974, the orchestra was "terribly frightened by the possibility of demonstrations by American women's rights activists. I believe that this pressure was decisive"; she adds that the orchestra voted to accept her not unanimously but "by a large majority", and that the vote showed generational differences, with retired members voting against her but "quite a few [younger players] got together and even got organized and said this can't go on any longer. The younger generation stood up for me..."

As of 2013, the orchestra had six female members; one of them, violinist Albena Danailova became one of the orchestra's concertmasters in 2008, the first woman to hold that position. In January 2005, Australian conductor Simone Young became the first woman to conduct the Vienna Philharmonic. In late December 2012, the issue of gender balance remained a concern in Austria: Austrian Radio ORF noted that women still made up just 6% of the orchestra's membership, compared to 14% in the Berlin Philharmonic, 30% in the London Symphony Orchestra, and 36% in the New York Philharmonic; it acknowledged progress but raised concerns that it was too slow. On the other hand, it quoted VPO president Clemens Hellsberg as saying that the VPO now uses completely blind auditions, simply chooses "the best we get", implying that full gender equity would take time as older members retire and new ones audition under gender-neutral conditions. (The Vienna Philharmonic will hire no musician over 35 years of age, and has a mandatory retirement age of 65; 30 years of service are required to receive a full pension.) As of December 2019, there were 15 female members.

There have also been claims that the orchestra has not always accepted members who are visibly members of ethnic minorities. In 1970, Otto Strasser, the former chairman of the Vienna Philharmonic, wrote in his memoirs, "I hold it incorrect that today the applicants play behind a screen; an arrangement that was brought in after the Second World War in order to assure objective judgments. I continuously fought against it... because I am convinced that to the artist also belongs the person, that one must not only hear, but also see, in order to judge him in his entire personality. [...] Even a grotesque situation that played itself out after my retirement was not able to change the situation. An applicant qualified himself as the best, and as the screen was raised, there stood a Japanese before the stunned jury. He was, however, not engaged, because his face did not fit with the Pizzicato-Polka of the New Year's Concert." In 1996, flautist Flury still expressed the view that "The soul does not let itself be separated from the cultural roots that we have here in central Europe."

In 2001 a violinist who was half-Asian became a member. The full list of musicians, men and women, including those playing with the Vienna Philharmonic but who are not members of the VPO association, is accessible on the website of the Vienna Philharmonic.

=== Period under National Socialism ===
The Vienna Philharmonic was for decades accused of withholding or suppressing information about its connections in the mid-20th century to the Nazi Party. The first orchestral representative to discuss the issue was Clemens Hellsberg (also trained as a musicologist), when he wrote the orchestra's official sesquicentennial history, Demokratie der Könige (Democracy of Kings). In it he determined that at the end of World War II 47% of orchestra members belonged to the Nazi Party or affiliates (the total number is now known to be 49%, 60 for 123 in 1942), that upon the Anschluss thirteen Jewish players were fired, that six of them were murdered (the number is now known to be seven), and "that the VPO once gave a concert in an SS barracks." But more remained to be investigated and made public, and access to relevant material in the orchestra's archives was highly restricted. Hellsberg, who became the orchestra's president in 1997, did not have full access to the archives until 2000/2001, and the historian Fritz Trümpi reports that when he began researching the orchestra's Third Reich activities in 2003 and requested access, he "was rebuffed by the management of the orchestra with a firm 'no' ... the idea that external researchers could come and root around in their archive was long considered taboo." Trümpi was granted access in 2007, but other researchers reported continued exclusion, such as Bernadette Mayrhoffer in 2008; the Austrian newspaper Die Presse reported in 2008 (in Sebastian Huebel's summary) that "scholars have had difficulties investigating the Vienna Philharmonic as they were not allowed access to the archives, or sources were delivered reluctantly and with timely delays."

The 2013 New Year's Day concert evoked critical discussion of the issue in the Austrian press and from Austrian parliamentarian Harald Walser. Shortly thereafter, Hellsberg commissioned an independent panel of three historians – Trümpi, his dissertation adviser Oliver Rathkolb (a professor at the University of Vienna), and Bernadette Mayrhofer – to fully investigate the orchestra's Third Reich activities and "in the spirit of transparency" (according to the orchestra's Facebook feed) publish the results on the orchestra's website. The panel was given unrestricted access to the archives. Rathkolb told an interviewer, "We were able to find new documents in a cellar, which normally contained archived music. It was an orchestra member who directed us to it."

On 10 March 2013—a date chosen to precede 12 March, the 75th anniversary of the Third Reich's union with Austria, the Anschluss—the panel published its findings in a set of reports posted on the orchestra's website. Among the panel's findings are:

- Before the Anschluss in the mid-1930s, 20% of the members of the orchestra belonged to the Nazi party. Former Vienna State Opera Secretary-General Ioan Holender notes that these members joined out of conviction, rather than for professional advancement, since party membership was illegal in Austria at the time.
- By the orchestra's centennial in 1942, 60 of the 123 active [Vienna Philharmonic] orchestral musicians had become members of the [Nazi Party] – that is, 48.8%. Two were members of the SS. By contrast, in the other major German-speaking orchestra, the Berlin Philharmonic, barely 20% were party members. For further comparison, party membership in Austria as a whole was 10%.
- The thirteen Jewish members of the orchestra were expelled by the National Socialists upon the Anschluss. Six of them escaped into exile; the other seven were killed – five in concentration camps, and two while still in Vienna as a direct result of attempted deportation and persecution.
- Rathkolb writes, "A total of nine orchestra members were driven into exile [including the six Jewish members noted above] ... The eleven remaining orchestra members who were married to Jewish women or stigmatized as 'half-Jewish' lived under the constant threat of revocation of their 'special permission.' ... It was only the intervention of Wilhelm Furtwängler and other individuals which ... with two exceptions, saved [these 11 remaining] 'half-Jews' and 'closely-related' from dismissal from the Vienna State Opera Orchestra."
- Of the musicians hired to replace the 13 dismissed Jewish members, about half were Nazi Party members, Rathkolb says.
- The panel revealed in new detail how the New Year's concerts began during the Nazi era. The first concert, given on New Year's Eve in 1939, was proposed by conductor Clemens Krauss and enthusiastically approved by Nazi Propaganda Minister Joseph Goebbels because it served the Reich's purposes of "propaganda through entertainment." (The concert was moved to New Year's Day for the concerts held from 1941 to 1945; it was revived in 1947 when it was conducted by Josef Krips, who had not been able to conduct during the war years because he was half-Jewish.) Further, the profits from the 1939 concert were "donated entirely to the national-socialistic fund-raising campaign 'Kriegswinterhilfswerk' The reports also note that Goebbels privately decided to ignore information about the partial Jewish ancestry of the Strauss family (Johann Strauss I's grandfather was Jewish by birth) partly because "it was not proven" and partly because he did "not want to undermine the entire German cultural heritage."
- At the war's end in 1945, the orchestra expelled ten of its members for Nazi activity; two were re-hired in ensuing years. One of them, the trumpeter Helmut Wobisch, had joined the Nazi Party in 1933 and the SS in 1934 and served as a spy for the Gestapo during the war. He was rehired by the orchestra in 1950 and appointed executive director of the orchestra in 1953, remaining in that position until 1967.
- The panel determined that it was Wobisch who in 1966 privately gave a replacement copy of the orchestra's "ring of honor" to Baldur von Schirach after the latter's release from Spandau Prison. As a result of the panel's reports, the Carinthian Summer Festival in Klagenfurt, Austria, cancelled its annual concert in honor of Wobisch (who was co-founder of the festival).
- The panel details how the orchestra gave "a great number of honorific awards… to Nazi potentates, including Arthur Seyss-Inquart [who was sentenced to death for his crimes against humanity in 1946] and Baldur von Schirach [who was sentenced to 20 years in Spandau Prison for his]." The orchestra also planned internally to give its highest award (the Nicolai Gold Medal) to Adolf Hitler in 1942, but there is no evidence that this award was ever given. (Rathkolb has told the press that Hellsberg "has asked [the orchestra] to revoke the rings of honour to these people.")

At its annual meeting on 23 October 2013, the orchestra voted to revoke all the honors bestowed to Nazi officials; the members voted after hearing a presentation by Rathkolb of the panel's findings. Clemens Helmsberg is quoted in the New York Times as saying that after Rathkolb's presentation, the orchestra needed no further discussion before revoking the honors since "it was such an obvious thing."

== Subscription conductors (1842–1933) ==
The Vienna Philharmonic has never had principal conductors. Each year they chose an artist to conduct all concerts of the respective season at Vienna's Musikverein. These conductors were called Abonnementdirigenten (subscription conductors) as they were to conduct all the concerts included in the Philharmonic's subscription at the Musikverein. Some of these annual hirings were renewed for many years, others lasted only for a few years. At the same time the Vienna Philharmonic also worked with other conductors, e. g. at the Salzburg Festival, for recordings or special occasions. With the widening of the Philharmonic's activities the orchestra decided to abandon this system in 1933. From then on there were only guest conductors hired for each concert, both in Vienna and elsewhere.

- Otto Nicolai (1842–1848)
- Karl Anton Eckert (1854–1857)
- Otto Dessoff (1860–1875)
- Hans Richter (1875–1882)
- Wilhelm Jahn (1882–1883)
- Hans Richter (1883–1898)
- Gustav Mahler (1898–1901)
- Joseph Hellmesberger, Jr. (1901–1903)
- Felix Weingartner (1908–1927)
- Wilhelm Furtwängler (1927–1930)
- Clemens Krauss (1930–1933)

== See also ==
- Summer Night Concert Schönbrunn - Annual concert conducted by the Vienna Philharmonic
