= Deats =

Deats is a surname. Notable people with the surname include:

- Danyi Deats (born 1967), American film actor and producer
- Hiram Deats (1810–1887), American agricultural equipment manufacturer
- Hiram Edmund Deats (1870–1963), American historian and philatelist
- John Deats (1769–1841), American wheelwright and inventor of the Deats plow

== See also ==
- Deetz
- Deitz
- Dietz
