= Marie Deetz =

German mezzo-soprano and stage actress

Marie Deetz, née Marie Brand, (11 December 1835 – 24 June 1893) was a German operatic mezzo-soprano and stage actress.

== Life ==
Born in Damm near Aschaffenburg, Deetz, the daughter of the municipal music director Brand, received her musical education in Vienna through Matteo Salvi and Eckart (Karl Anton Eckert?) and entered the stage for the first time in Hanover in 1856 as Agathe in Der Freischütz. From 1856 until 1860, she worked in Mannheim, then in Leipzig, Wiesbaden, Rotterdam and Amsterdam. Then she didn't accept any further fixed engagement, but only appeared as a guest at excellent art places.

She was the first "Elsa" in Mannheim (9 January 1859) and in Rotterdam (19 January 1859) as well as the first "Gretchen" in Amsterdam, Wiesbaden and Rotterdam, created "Elisabeth" in Tannhäuser in Amsterdam in 1865 and "Selika" in L'Africaine in Leipzig on 12 February 1866.

Deetz finished her stage career in 1876.

She was married with the actor and director Arthur Deetz (1826-1897) from 1858.

Deetz died in 1893 at the age of 59. She was buried at the Jerusalem and New Church in front of the Hallesches Tor, where her husband would later also find his final resting place. Both graves have not been preserved.
