= Borkenau =

Borkenau is a surname. Notable people with the surname include:

- Franz Borkenau (1900–1957), Austrian writer and publicist
- Moritz Borkenau (1827–1904), Jewish Austrian financier
