= Deitz =

Deitz is a surname. Notable people with the surname include:

- Alonzo E. Deitz (1836–1921), American lock manufacturer
- Doug Deitz (1914–1994), Australian rugby league player
- Richard Deitz (born 1965), American hedge fund manager
- Robert Deitz (born 1946), American intelligence officer and lawyer
- Shane Deitz (born 1975), Australian cricketer
- Terry Deitz (born 1959), United States Naval aviator and reality television show contestant
- Tom Deitz (1952–2009), American writer

== See also ==
- Deitz Farm, a national historic district in West Virginia
