= Oskar Deutsch =

Austrian entrepreneur

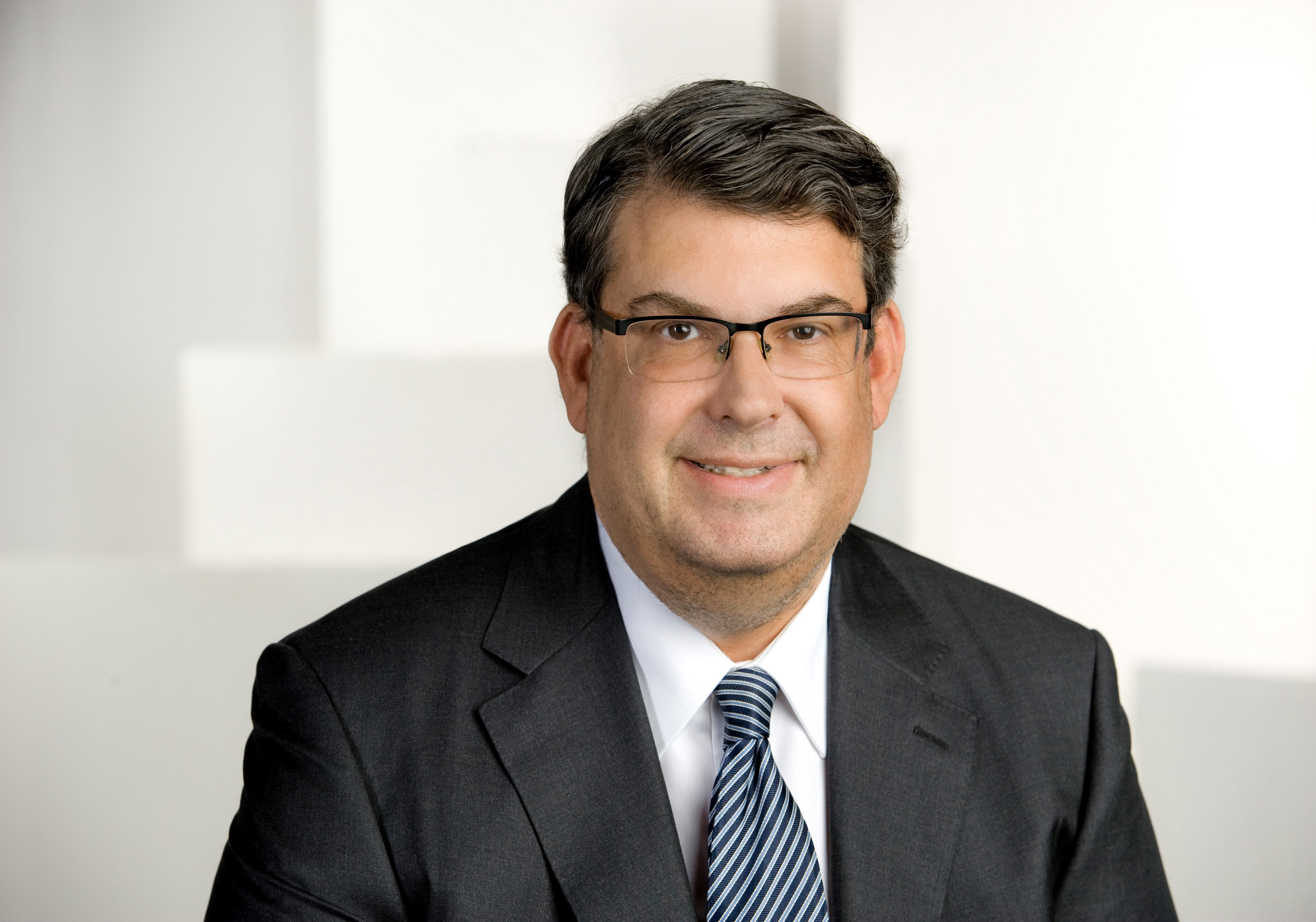
- Born: Vienna, Austria
- Education: Vienna University of Economics and Business
- Occupation: President of the Jewish Community of Vienna
- Predecessor: Ariel Muzicant

Oskar Deutsch (born 1963 in Vienna) is an Austrian entrepreneur, and since 2012 President of the Jewish Community of Vienna (IKG) and the Federal Association of Jewish Religious Communities in Austria.

== Biography ==
Deutsch attended the American International School Vienna, and studied at the Vienna University of Economics and Business. After working in various positions in the family-owned coffee trading company Alvorada in Vösendorf, he was managing director.

He has been a member of the Cultural Council of the Israelite Community in Vienna since 1993. In 1997 Deutsch co-founded the electoral list Atid (“Jewish Future”) together with Ariel Muzicant. In 1999 he became vice president of the religious community. In addition, he is chairman of the Maccabi Vienna sports club, and in 2011 was the head of the organizing committee of the 13th European Maccabiah Games in Vienna.

After Deutsch was elected President of the IKG on February 21, 2012, as the successor to the resigned Ariel Muzicant, confirmation was given on November 29, 2012, by the newly elected IKG Board of Directors. Deutsch's election was overshadowed by the ban on Ronald Lauder from the World Jewish Congress after the latter allegedly wanted to help Deutsch's opponents come to power with an injection of money. On January 13, 2013, after a reconciliation between Lauder and Deutsch, the trespass warning was lifted.

After the 2020 Vienna attack on 2 November, Deutsch said that while the shooting was near the city's main synagogue, it wasn't clear whether the building was targeted.

In December 2020 Deutsch apologised for allowing non-prioritised individuals, including himself, to receive doses of the coronavirus vaccine meant for at risk members of the Jewish community.

In July 2025, he defended Israel's activities in Gaza in an interview for Austria's State TV, while stating that criticism of Israel was "entriely legitimate." However, when pushed to account for any specific criticism, whether from European governments, the Red Cross, Médecins Sans Frontières or other critics of Israel, Deutsch responded that "we don't know." This interview was harshly criticized also by members of the Jewish community in Austria, but he refused to step down.

== Works ==
- The Future of Europe and Judaism: Impulses for a Social Discourse (Ed.) Böhlau Verlag, Vienna 2017, ISBN 9783205205319
