= Deetz (surname) =

Deetz is a surname, derived, either, from the name of a village/town, "Deetz", in Anhalt-Bitterfeld, in Saxony-Anhalt, Germany, or, from a variant from the German "Deth" or some other short form of an old personal name formed with Old High German "Diot", meaning 'people' or 'nation'.

Notable people with the surname include:

- Arthur Deetz (1826–1897), German actor and theatre director
- Dean Deetz (born 1993), American baseball player
- James Deetz (1930–2000), American anthropologist (see also Deetzian).
- Stanley A. Deetz (born 1948), American communication scholar
