= Renaissance Capital =

Russian investment bank

- Type: Private
- Industry: Finance and Investment Banking
- Founded: 1995; 31 years ago
- Headquarters: London, United Kingdom
- Key people: Ruslan Babaev, Anna Vyshlova, Anthony Simone, Elena Grishina
- Products: Investment Banking
- Website: www.rencap.com

Renaissance Capital is a Russian and frontier markets focused investment bank founded in 1995 in Russia. The firm has offices in Moscow, London, New York, Lagos, Nairobi, Cairo and Nicosia.

Both Alexander Provotorov (born 7 November 1974, Moscow) and Konstantin Malofeev, who were close friends and classmates at Moscow State University (MSU), worked together at Renaissance Capital after their graduation from MSU in 1996 until its default in 1998.

Since 2012, Renaissance Capital has been part of ONEXIM Group, one of Russia's largest private investment holding companies, owned by Russian billionaire Mikhail Prokhorov.

Renaissance Capital offers investment banking services in debt and equity capital markets, M&A, equity and equity derivatives, fixed income, FX and FX derivatives, commodities products, prime brokerage, research, as well as REPO and financing.

As of 30 June 2021, the Firm’s total assets and equity amounted to $3.62bn and $476mn, respectively, and the reported 1H21 net profit was $6.45mn.

== History ==
Renaissance Capital was established in 1995 by a group of founding partners, including Stephen Jennings, Boris Jordan, Leonid Rozhetskin, Anton Kudryashov and Richard Deitz.

Since 2004, Oleg Zhelezko, at the invitation of Stephen Jennings, took control of the direction of trading in derivative securities in the Renaissance Capital investment bank

On September 22, 2008, ONEXIM Group and Renaissance entered into a strategic partnership whereby ONEXIM Group purchased a 50% (minus one share) stake in Renaissance Capital for $500 million following the issuance of new equity, commenting that the acquisition “presents the opportunity to take Renaissance Capital to the next level”.

In 2010, Renaissance Capital paid 207 million rand ($27 million) to acquire Barnard Jacobs Mellet Securities Ltd., the South African stock brokerage.

In November 2012, ONEXIM Group acquired further stakes in Renaissance Capital which resulted a full ownership of the investment bank and indirect ownership of an 89% stake in the consumer finance bank Renaissance Credit. Commenting on the deal, Dmitry Razumov, chief executive officer of ONEXIM Group, said “We strongly believe in the strategy of Renaissance Capital and that the financial resources of ONEXIM will only strengthen the unique position of the bank in the markets in which it operates.” The transaction was completed in April 2013, following the receipt of all necessary regulatory approvals.

Renaissance Capital has been active in Africa for several years. The firm established a presence on the continent in 2007 with locations in Lagos and Nairobi and opened offices in Johannesburg, Cape Town and Cairo in 2010, 2015 and 2017 respectively.

In April 2017, Renaissance Capital announced the upcoming opening of its Cairo office, focusing on investment banking, financing and research, and received its licence to operate in the country later that year.

In July 2019, Renaissance Capital became a trading member of Astana International Exchange (AIX) in Kazakhstan.

== Geography ==
Renaissance Capital is focused on emerging and frontier markets. The firm has offices in Moscow, London, New York, Lagos, Nairobi, Cape Town, Cairo and Nicosia.

Renaissance Capital's office in Lagos (Nigeria) serves as a hub for the firm's West African operations, and its Nairobi (Kenya) office provides a base for its activities in the east of the continent. The firm has managed transactions in Nigeria, Kenya, South Africa, Ethiopia, Uganda, Rwanda, Tanzania, Egypt and Zambia.

== Product offering ==
Renaissance Capital offers a variety of investment banking services in debt and equity capital markets and M&A, sales and trading in equity, fixed income, FX and derivatives, hedging, REPO and financing, as well as prime brokerage and research.

The firm has established an algorithmic trading unit as part of its existing derivatives business to meet growing client demand, and capitalise on market opportunities.

Renaissance Capital has acted as organiser on a number of capital markets transactions in Russia, including: Beeline $127.4 mn IPO on NYSE in November 1996 – the first IPO out of Russia; ALROSA $1.3bn IPO in October 2013 – the largest IPO ever on Moscow Exchange; RUSAL $2.24 bn IPO in January 2010 – Hong Kong’s first ever offering by a Russian company; as well as major retail IPOs – Rosneft $10.7 bn IPO in July 2006 and VTB c.$8 bn IPO in May 2007.

In the frontier and emerging space, Renaissance Capital has organised a number of transactions including the following:

- A GEL500 million three-year senior bond issue for Bank of Georgia, the first-ever local currency international bond issue out of Georgia.
- A RUB15bn issue for Kazakhstan Temir Zholy (KTZ), the state railway company of the Republic of Kazakhstan, the first corporate issue for a foreign borrower in the Russian domestic rouble market.
- A $350 million eurobond sale for Eurotorg, the first corporate international bond issuance by a Belarusian company.
- Nigeria's NGN10 billion debut corporate infrastructure bond for Viathan Group, a private equity-backed company, providing power to the government, household and businesses in Nigeria, using natural gas as fuel.
- A UGX167bn IPO of CiplaQCIL, a Uganda-based pharmaceutical producer of high-quality and affordable life-saving medicines, on the Ugandan Stock Exchange.
- The Bank of Kigali Group rights issue and private placement, which raised c. KES7bn, making it the largest-ever capital raise in Rwanda and the largest capital markets transaction in East Africa in 2018.
- Gazprom’s CHF750mn international bond issue with the 1.45% coupon rate, the lowest-ever coupon by an emerging markets (EM) corporate.
- A CHF200mn four-year issue for Africa Finance Corporation, with the lowest coupon an African issuer has ever achieved in the CHF market.
- Debut $300mn international bond issue and debut $125mn additional tier 1 issue for TBC Bank – the largest ever amount issued by a Georgian bank in AT1 format.
