= Zionist General Council =

Supreme institution of the Zionist movement

- הוועד הפועל הציוני
- Founded: 1921; 105 years ago
- Location: Israel
- Key people: Helena Glaser, chairperson
- Website: www.jewishagency.org

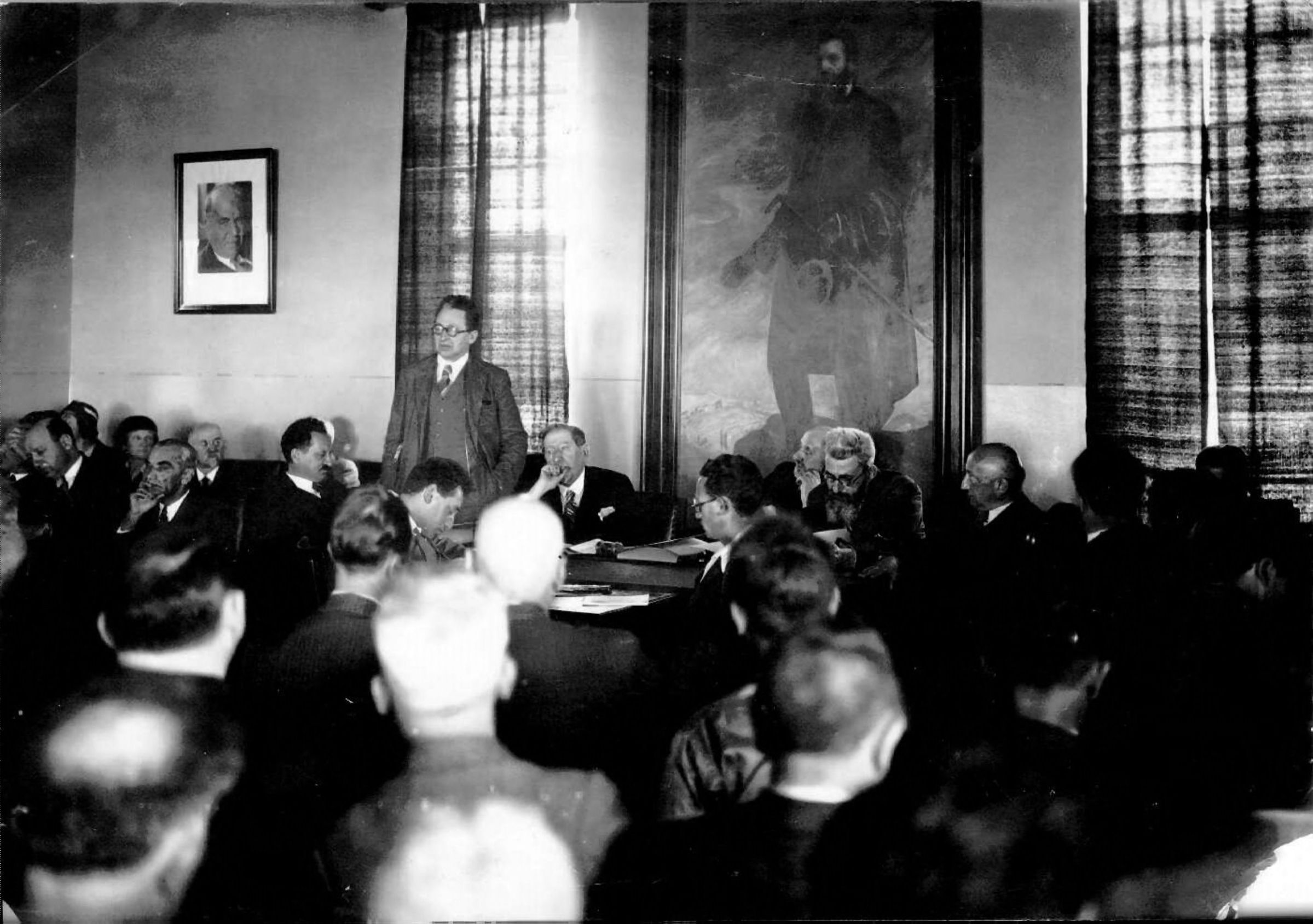
Yitzhak Ben-Zvi addresses Zionist General Council meeting in Jerusalem, 1935

Zionist General Council (ZGC; Hebrew: הוועד הפועל הציוני, romanized: HaVa'ad HaPoel HaTzioni) is the supreme institution of the Zionist movement.

The ZGC was established in 1921 following a decision reached at the 11th World Zionist Congress. It is composed of members elected at the World Zionist Congress and representatives of Zionist organizations. The council has 25–30 members. The ZGC is responsible for implementing decisions reached at the World Zionist Congress and the administration of the Zionist movement.

In 2010, Helena Glaser, President of World WIZO, was unanimously elected chairperson of the Zionist General Council at the 36th World Zionist Congress in Jerusalem.

== List of chairpeople ==
- 1921–1925: Tzvi-Peretz Hayot
- 1925–1933: Leo Motzkin
- 1935–1941: Menachem Ussishkin
- 1946–1949: Stephen Samuel Wise
- 1949–1959: Yosef Sprinzak
- 1959–1961: Berl Locker
- 1961–1968: Ya'akov Tzur
- 1968–1971: Ehud Avriel
- 1972–1978: Yitzhak Navon
- 1978–1982: Yitzhak Peretz
- 1983–2010: Rabbi Richard Hirsch
- 2010–Present: Helena Glaser
