= Jewish Community of Vienna =

Jewish organization in Vienna, Austria

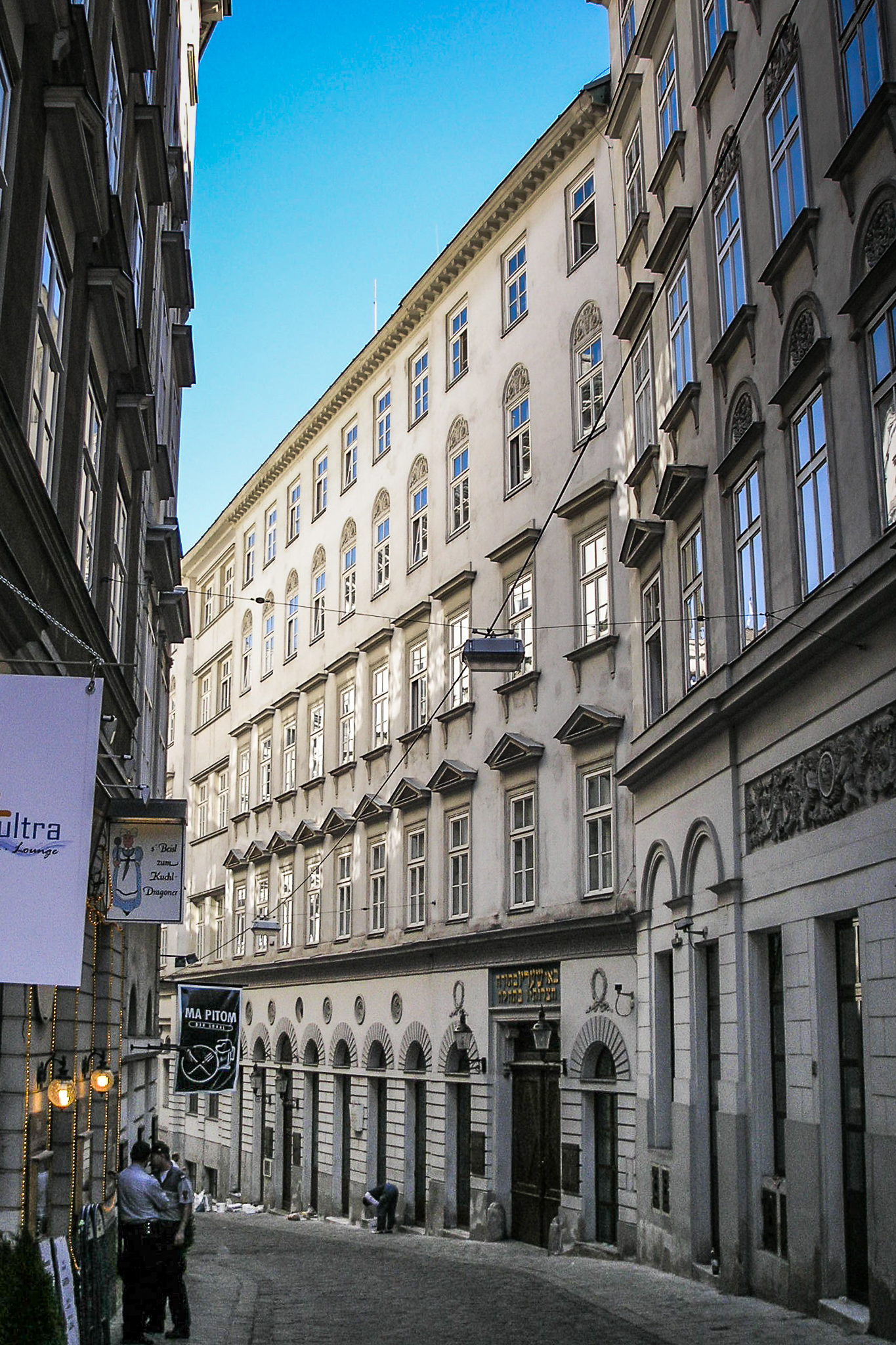
The IKG's main building in the Seitenstettengasse

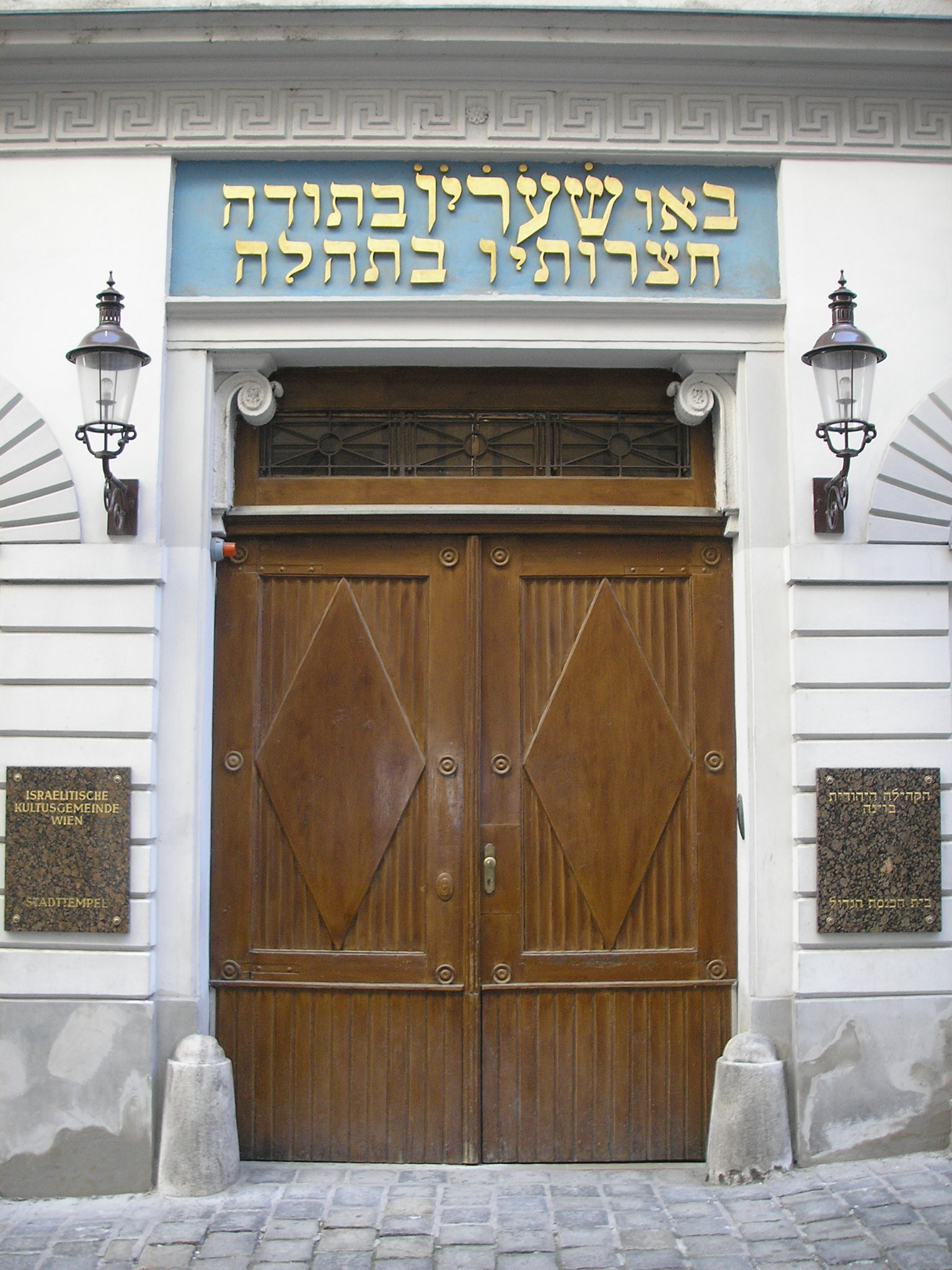
The main entrance to the IKG's main building in the Seitenstettengasse

The Jewish Community of Vienna (Israelitische Kultusgemeinde Wien or IKG) is the body that represents Vienna's Orthodox Jewish community. Today, the IKG has around 10,000 members. Throughout history, it has represented almost all of Austria's Jews, whose numbers are sufficient to form communities in only a few other cities in Austria.

== Organisation ==
The IKG provides its members with a range of services in social, religious, and educational affairs. It publishes an official newspaper (Die Gemeinde) twice monthly. The Contact point for Jewish victims of National-Socialist persecution in and from Austria supports and advises affected individuals and their families with regard to reparations and compensation. The current president of the IKG is Oskar Deutsch, who has been in office since 2012. Jaron Engelmayer was appointed Chief Rabbi of Vienna in August 2020.

== History ==
The history of Vienna's Jewish population dates back to the time of the Roman Empire, but for a long time, Vienna's Jews were prevented from forming an organisation to represent themselves, as a result of legal and social discrimination. This situation first began to change with Emperor Joseph II's 1782 Edict of Tolerance.

The emancipation of Vienna's Jewish population began in 1848. In a speech held on 3 April 1849, the young emperor, Franz Joseph I, used the words Israelite Community of Vienna for the first time; three years later, a provisory constitution for the community was enacted, and 1852 is therefore considered the year in which Vienna's Kultusgemeinde was founded. The community's offices were established in the Stadttempel in the Seitenstettengasse.

Vienna's Jewish community had around 185,000 members at the time of Austria's Anschluss with the Third Reich in 1938. In that same year, the Nazis closed the IKG down. It was re-opened in May 1938 as the Vienna Jewish Community, with the task of acting as a buffer organisation between the Nazis and Vienna's Jewish population. This body was also forced to organise the emigration, and later the deportation, of Vienna's Jews for the Central Office for Jewish Emigration. The title Israelitische Kultusgemeinde Wien has been in use again since 1945.

On 29 August 1981, a terrorist attack was made on the synagogue in the Seitenstettengasse, using hand grenades and firearms. Two people died, and another 21 were injured in the attack. The attack is attributed to the Palestinian extremist Abu Nidal Organisation. Since then, strict security has been in place at the entrance to the synagogue, while the Seitenstettengasse is guarded by the police.

In January 2022 an international campaign was launched calling on IKG President Oskar Deutsch to intervene in the case of Beth Alexander who had been denied access to her twin sons following a custody battle in the Austrian courts some years earlier.

=== Presidents of the IKG since 1853 ===
- Leopold Edler von Wertheimstein (1853−1863)
- Josef Ritter von Wertheimer (1864−1867)
- Jonas Freiherr von Königswarter (1868−1871)
- Ignaz Kuranda (1872−1884)
- Moritz Ritter von Borkenau (1884−1885)
- Arminio Cohn (1886−1890)
- Wilhelm Ritter von Gutmann (1891−1892)
- 1893 − 1896 vacant
- Gustav Simon (1896−1897)
- Heinrich Klinger (1897−1903)
- Alfred Stern (1904−1918)
- Alois Pick (1920−1932, new elections, first use of proportional voting)
- Desider Friedmann (murdered in the Auschwitz concentration camp) (from 1933)
- David Brill (1946−1948)
- Kurt Heitler (September 1950 to May 1951)
- David Shapira (1948−1952)
- Emil Maurer (1952−1963)
- Ernst Feldsberg (1963−1970)
- Anton Pick (1970−1981)
- Ivan Hacker (1982−1987)
- Paul Grosz (1987−1998)
- Ariel Muzicant (1998−2012)
- Oskar Deutsch (since 2012)

=== Rabbis of the IKG since 1824 ===
- Isaak Noah Mannheimer (1824−1865)
- Adolf Jellinek (1865−1893)
- Moritz Güdemann (1894−1918)
- Zwi Perez Chajes (1918−1927)
- David Feuchtwang – Chief Rabbi (1933−1936)
- Israel Taglicht – interim Chief Rabbi (1936)
- Isidor Öhler – Preacher in the Stadttempel (1946)
- Akiba Eisenberg – Chief Rabbi (1948−1983)
- Paul Chaim Eisenberg – Chief Rabbi (1983–2016)
- Arie Folger – Chief Rabbi ( -2026)
- Yaron Nisenholz – Chief Rabbi (2026-)

=== Cantorates ===
- Shmuel Barzilai, Chief Cantor

Salman Klahr, until 1938, https://en.wikipedia.org/wiki/Alfred_Klahr

== The IKG's archive ==
The IKG's archive is the only archive of a Jewish community known to have been maintained in its entirety from the founding of the community to the time after World War II, and is thus one of the most important archives in German-speaking Europe. It contains meeting minutes, decrees, protocols, reports, letters, emigration and finance documents, lists of deportees, indexes, books, photographs, plans, and posters which bear witness to the history of the IKG and its members. The oldest documents date from the 16th century. The archive has been in existence since 1816; it was increasingly professional from the middle of the 19th century.

The indexes and files that were produced between 1938 and 1945 were the basis for Nazi management of Jewish emigration and deportation. Today, these documents are a record of the fate of exiled and murdered Jews, and are used to aid survivors' claims for restitution and compensation.

In 1995, archival evidence was discovered of the 1945 Deutsch Schützen massacre, which led to prosecution in 2009.

== See also ==
- Rothschild Hospital – hospital of the IKG from 1873 to 1943
