= Moriz Pollack von Borkenau =

Austrian financier (1827-1904)

Moriz Pollack, Ritter von Borkenau (24 December 1827 in Vienna – 20 August 1904 in Vienna) was a Jewish Austrian financier.

After leaving the secondary school gymnasium in Vienna, at the age of 22, he took charge of his father's wholesale leather business and soon succeeded in extending his export trade to France and Germany. In 1857 he was elected to the municipal council of Vienna and took an active part in the relief and construction works in the year of the great flood (1862). Soon afterwards he took charge of the budget of the city of Vienna, acting as auditor until his resignation in 1885. In 1867 he was sent by the city of Vienna as one of the delegates on the occasion of the coronation of the King of Hungary at Budapest, and in 1873 he was made chairman of the executive committee of the Vienna Exposition. He entered the Niederösterreichische Escomptebank as examiner, and was director-general and vice-president from 1885 to 1898, also officiating as deputy of the Vienna Chamber of Commerce, director of the Wiener Kaufmannshalle, and examiner of the Austro-Hungarian Bank.

Pollak took a very active part in the affairs of the Jewish community, filling various offices, including finally that of president of the IKG Wien from 4 May 1884 to 27 December 1885. Besides many other decorations he received the cross of the Legion of Honor, in recognition of his services at the Paris Exposition of 1878; five years before, for his services in connection with the Exposition of Vienna, he had received from the Austrian emperor the patent of nobility with the title "Von Borkenau".
