= Ariel Muzicant =

Austro-Israeli entrepreneur, former president of the Jewish Community Vienna

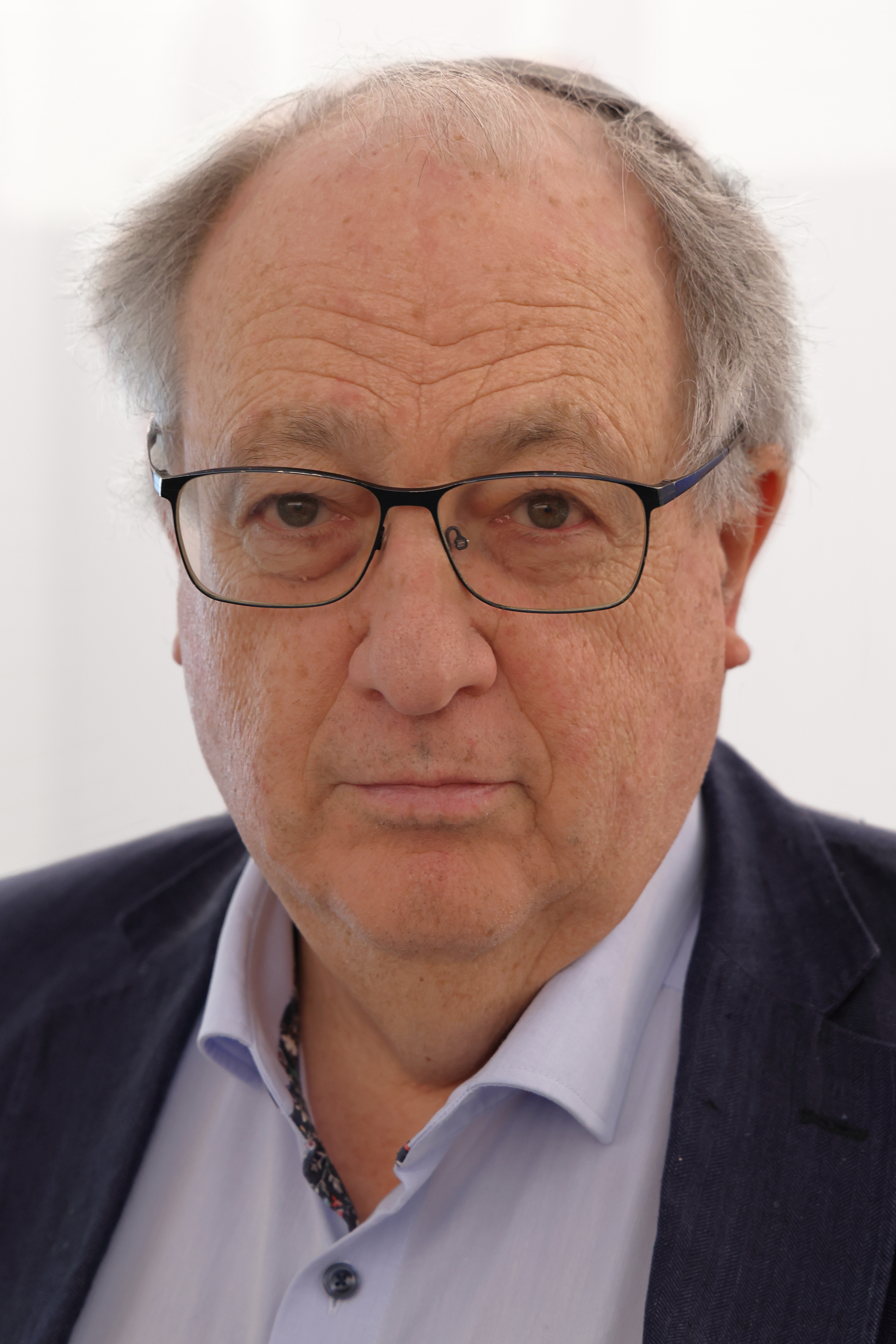
Ariel Muzicant, 2026

Ariel Muzicant (Hebrew: אריאל מוזיקנט; born 1952 in Haifa, Israel) is an Austrian-Israeli businessman, who served as the president of the Viennese Jewish community (Israelitische Kultusgemeinde Wien).

He is the president of the Bnai Brith lodge Zwi-Perez-Chajes and initiator of the Zwi Perez Chajes school in Vienna. He was identified as the 74th richest Austrian by the Austrian magazine "Trend" in 2006 (7-8/2006), his net worth being between €50 and €200 million euros. His core business is real estate.

Muzicant has been living in Vienna since the age of four, he attended the French lyceum in Vienna and finished his academic education in 1976 with a doctorate in medicine. Afterwards, he joined the real-estate agency owned by his father. Muzicant was part of diverse Jewish organisations already during his studying times at university, in 1973/74 he was chairman of the Viennese Jewish academic students.

In 1998 he was elected President of the Israelite Cultural Organization of Vienna and re-elected six years later in 2004. Ariel Muzicant is the first president of the IKG born after the Shoah and the Second World War. From 1982 till 2004 (with an interruption of two years) he was vice-president of the Jewish community and after his election he succeeded Paul Grosz, who was named honorary president a few days after Muzicant's victory. Since 1990 he is also a member of the board of directors of the Jewish Museum Vienna as well as member of the executive board of the Vienna Wiesenthal Institute for Holocaust Studies (VWI).

== Sources ==
- Interview with and biography of Ariel Muzicant on haGalil.com (in German)
