= Arthur Deetz =

German stage actor and theatre director (1826–1897)

- Born: 18 June 1826; Wesel, Germany
- Died: 16 July 1897 (aged 71); Berlin, Germany
- Occupations: Stage actor, theatre director
- Spouse: Marie Brand (m. 1858; died 1893)

Arthur Deetz (18 June 1826 – 16 July 1897) was a German stage actor and theatre director.

== Life ==
Born in Wesel, Deetz, son of a medical officer, first dedicated himself to military service and in 1843 he joined the seventh artillery brigade in Cologne as a flag squadron officer. After three years of military service, however, he went to the stage, following his youthful inclination. He had his first appearance at the court theatre in Neu-Strelitz on 8 November 1846. Two years later, he joined the Burgtheater, but soon he left the theatre to work in Leipzig, Weimar, Pest, Mannheim (1856-1860), Karlsruhe, Darmstadt, Dessau etc.

In 1864, Deetz took over the "Deutsche Oper" in Amsterdam, where he achieved artistic successes and performed Wagner and Gounod for the first time. In 1873, he was engaged at the Royal Theatre in Berlin, where he made his debut as "Königsleutnant" and "Odoardo". Only one year later, he was appointed as a director and in 1877 he became artistic director.

In this year, Deetz, who first appeared in the heroic fathers and rhetorical character roles, decided to become an actor.

As "Chorführer Cajetan" he appeared in public for the last time on 3 June 1878.

He was a popular tasteful actor, who took his art very seriously. Faust, Nathan, Tell, Wallenstein, King's Lieutenant, Götz etc. belonged to his best roles. As a director, he was in charge of the art institute, on whose welfare and prosperity his whole mind was directed, until 1887. After that, he retreated into his private life.

From 1858 he was married with the actress Marie Brand (1835-1893).

Deetz died in Berlin at the age of 71. He was buried at Cemetery I of the Jerusalem and New Church in front of the Hallesches Tor, where his wife had already found her final resting place. None of the graves have been preserved.
