= Richard Deitz =

American investment manager

Richard Andrew Deitz
- Born: August 12, 1965 (age 61); Washington, D.C., US
- Education: Yale University, 1987
- Occupation: Asset management
- Title: President and Chief Investment Officer, VR Capital Group
- Spouse: Marina Nacheva

Richard Andrew Deitz (born August 12, 1965) is an American investment manager. He is the founder and president of London-based investment firm VR Capital Group.

== Early life and education ==
Deitz was born in Washington, D.C. and attended public school in Montgomery County, Maryland. He studied history and economics at Yale University where he graduated magna cum laude in 1987.

== Career ==
After graduating from Yale, he began his career in finance specializing in fixed income derivatives at The First Boston Corporation. Deitz remained with the firm in New York City upon its takeover by Credit Suisse, becoming managing director at Credit Suisse Financial Products in 1993. In 1994, he moved to London and then Moscow to establish the derivatives unit's presence in Eastern Europe.

In 1995, Deitz left Credit Suisse together with several colleagues to co-found the investment bank, Renaissance Capital, in Moscow where he ran the firm's fixed income trading business. In 1998, Deitz left Renaissance Capital and founded VR Capital Group to build an asset management business focused on distressed debt investing. The firm launched a fund in May 1999 initially investing in distressed credits in Russia and the former Soviet Union following the 1998 Russian financial crisis and the demise of Long Term Capital Management. VR Capital has become known for investing into countries undergoing high levels of macroeconomic stress and working with sovereign and corporate debtors to restructure their balance sheets and regain access to capital markets. VR Capital invested heavily in Argentina following the sovereign default and currency devaluation in 2001, and likewise was a major investor in Greece in 2012 and Ukraine in 2014.

Its flagship fund, VR Global Partners, L.P., had assets under management of approximately US$4.4 billion at the end of 2017 and was cited by Barron's in June 2016 for its performance over the past decade. The fund's offshore version was named "Fund of the Year" at the HFM US Hedge Fund Performance Awards 2017 and won the "Distressed" category at the EuroHedge Awards 2017. The fund's offshore version also walked away as the winner of the “Credit over $500m” category at the HFM European Hedge Fund Performance Awards 2018.

In May 2016, Deitz was a speaker at the 21st annual Sohn Investment Conference in New York where he articulated the firm's investment thesis on Greek government bonds and banks. He has also written op-ed columns on Argentine and Greek debt restructurings.

== Personal life ==
Deitz lives in London and is married to Marina Nacheva. They have three children.

Deitz serves on the President's Council on International Activities and on the Jackson Institute Council at Yale University. Deitz's family have been sponsors of autism research at the Yale Child Study Center.

Deitz is a co-owner of EuroLeague Basketball team Maccabi Tel Aviv.
