= Shmuel Barzilai =

Israeli cantor

Shmuel Barzilai שמואל ברזילי
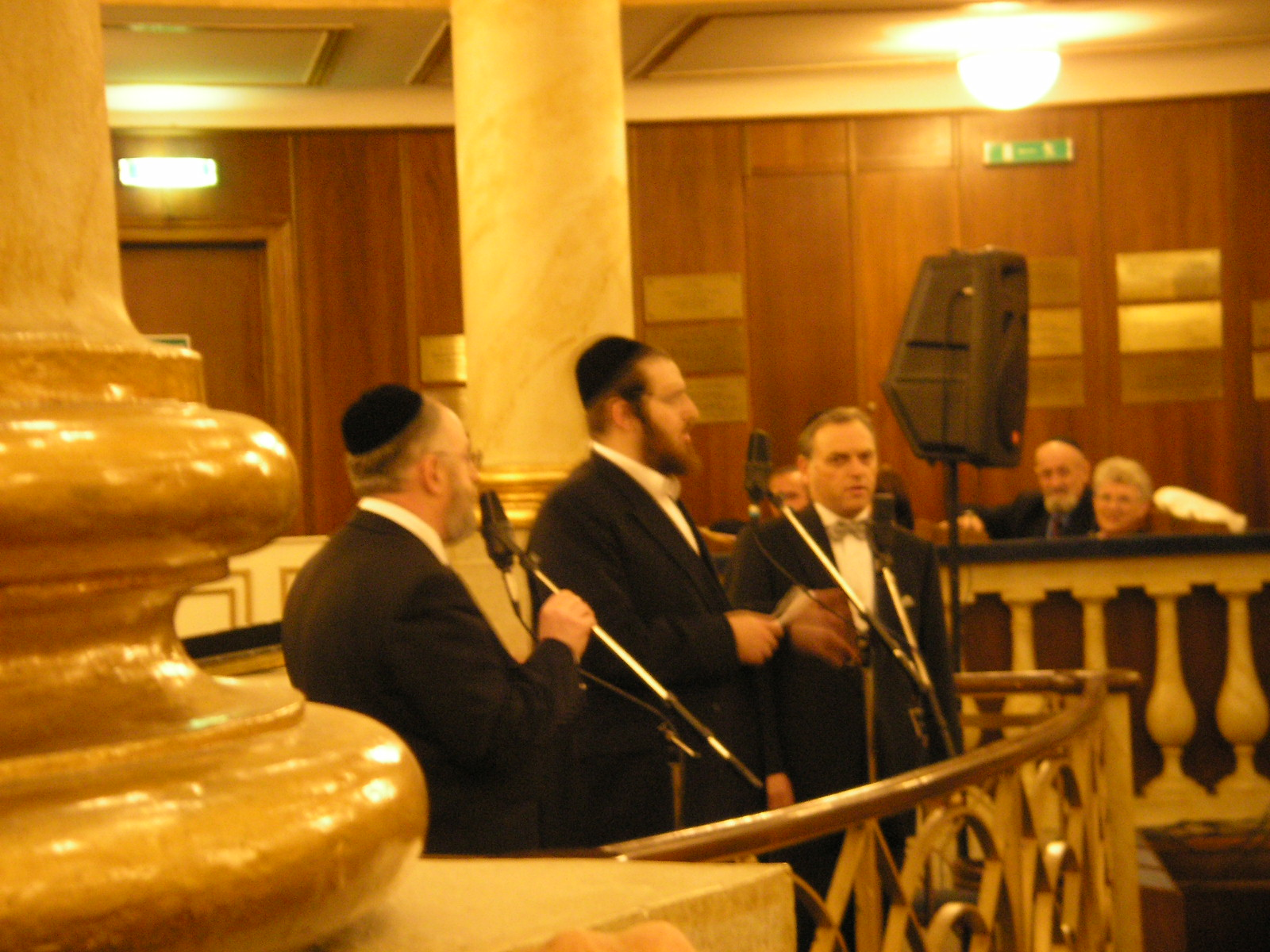
- 2006 concert in the Vienna Stadttempel.

Background information
- Born: 3 June 1957 (age 69); Jerusalem, Israel
- Occupation: Cantor
- Instrument: Tenor vocals
- Website: www.cantor-barzilai.com

Shmuel Barzilai (Hebrew: שמואל ברזילי; born 3 June 1957) is an Israeli cantor. He is the chief cantor of the Israelitische Kultusgemeinde Wien in Vienna.

== Biography ==
Shmuel Barzilai was born in Jerusalem. He is a son of Shlomo Barzilai, also a cantor. Barzilai has a lyrical tenor voice, and studied under cantor Moshe Stern at the Tel Aviv Institute for Cantorial Art. He was in the first graduating class of the Institute, which was established under former Tel Aviv mayor Shlomo Lahat.

== Cantorial career ==
Barzilai has served as the chief cantor in Vienna since 1992 and frequently tours throughout Europe.

== Discography ==
- "Das Lied der Lieder; Festgesänge des Wiener Stadttempels", Jüdisches Museum Wien, ÖRF (1993)
- "Schir Zion" (composed by Salomon Sulzer), Jüdisches Museum Wien, ORF (1996)
- "Best Chasidic" (1996)
- "Live in Concert: אב הרחמים"
- "Shalom" (1999; with Hanan Bar Sela (חנן בַּר סלע), Arie Braun (אריה בְּראון); jacket design by Dvora Barzilai
- "Wiener Sängerknaben & Oberkantor Shmuel Barzilai", ORF (2000)
- "The Symphony of Prayer; סימְפוֹניה שֶׁל תְפילה", ORF (2003; conducting by Elli Jaffe)
