= Zwi Perez Chajes =

Italian rabbi, historian, biblical scholar, and Zionist leader

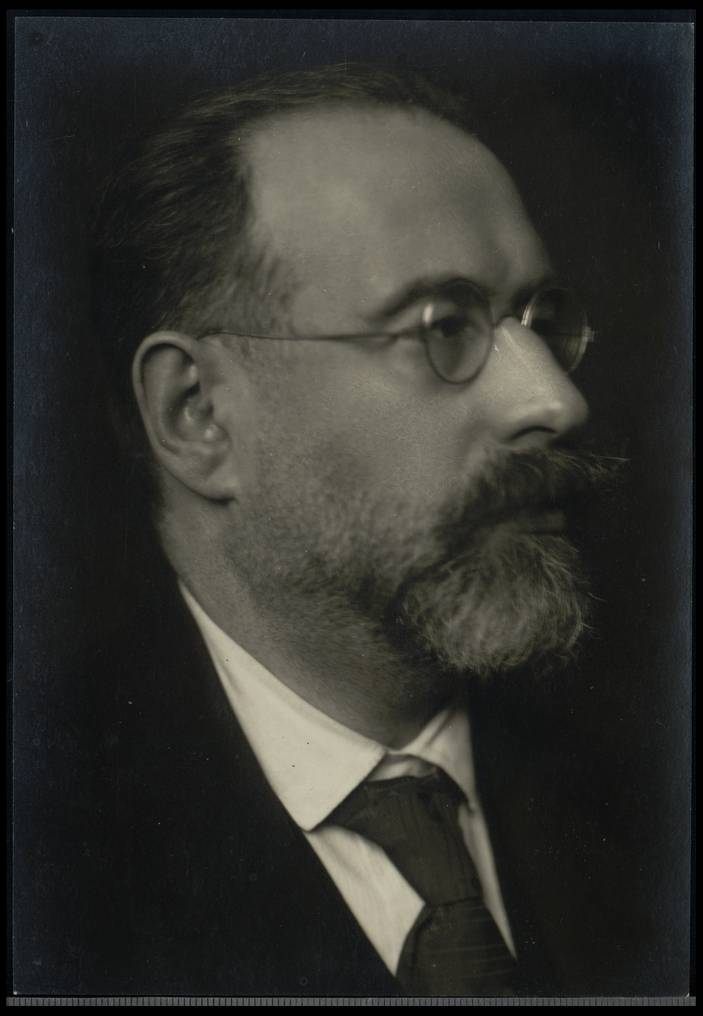

Personal life
- Born: 13 October 1876 Brody, Galicia, Austria-Hungary
- Died: 13 December 1927 (aged 51) Vienna, Austria

Religious life
- Religion: Judaism

Zwi Perez Chajes, also Tzvi-Peretz Hayyut, (13 October 1876 – 13 December 1927) was a rabbi, historian, biblical scholar and a notable Zionist leader.

== Biography ==
Zwi Perez Chajes was born in 1876 in Brody, then part of Austria-Hungary, now in Ukraine. He was the grandson of the Zvi Hirsch Chajes. Hayot learned in a Yeshiva and was ordained as a rabbi and also studied at a university.

Chajes died in Vienna in 1927. His remains were later taken to Israel and he was reburied in the Trumpeldor cemetery in Tel Aviv.

== Rabbinic career ==
Chajes served as the rabbi of the Jewish community in Florence, Italy from 1901 and also headed the rabbinical school in Florence. Until 1918, he served as a rabbi in the city of Trieste.

From 1918 to his death, Chajes served as the chief rabbi of the Jewish community of Vienna. In addition, he was Chairman of the Zionist General Council from 1921 to 1925

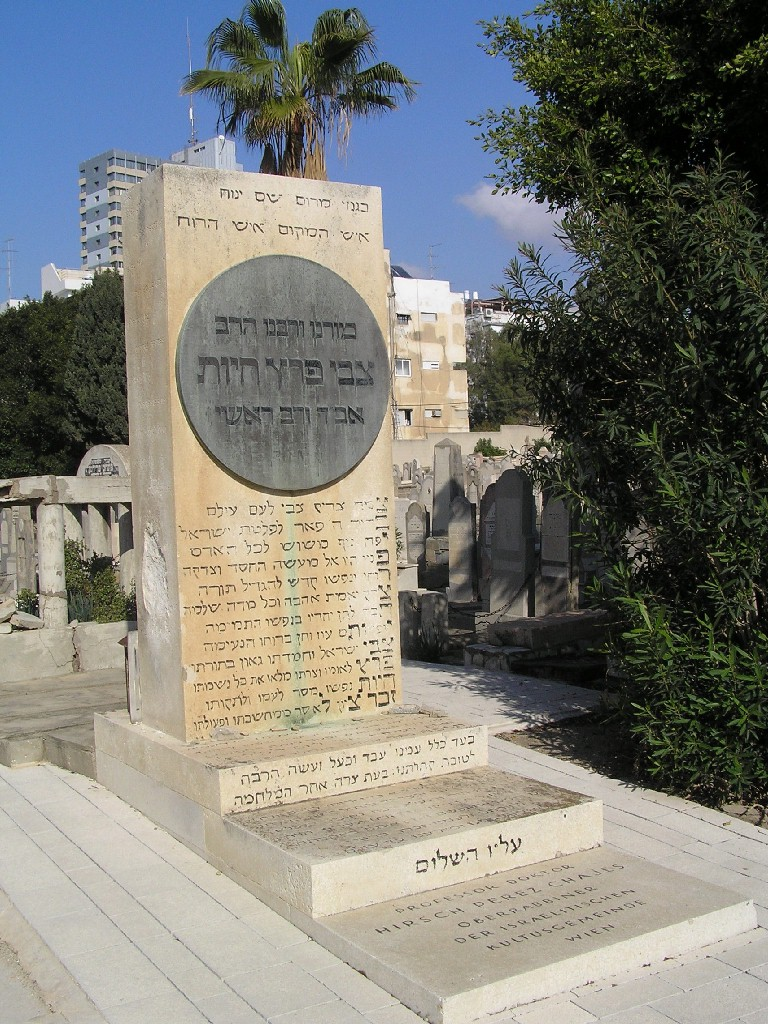
Grave of Zwi Perez Chajes

== Commemoration ==
The main Jewish school in Vienna is named after him. When it reopened in 1984, it was the first Jewish high school in the post-Holocaust German-speaking world.
