= Karl Anton Eckert =

German conductor and composer

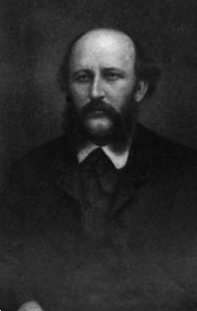
Karl Eckert in 1905

Karl Anton Florian Eckert (17 December 1820 – 14 October 1879) was a German conductor and composer.

== Life ==
Eckert was born in Berlin. By the age of five, had already proved himself as a musical child prodigy. After coming to the attention of Sing-Akademie zu Berlin director Carl Friedrich Zelter, he was entered into the academy in 1832, and with Zelter's support had his debut piano concert in the fall of that year.

He was later appointed Kapellmeister of Staatsoper Unter den Linden where he remained until the spring of 1848. After the end of the political turmoil of the Revolutions of 1848, Eckert left Berlin for Amsterdam, and later Brussels.

Eckert died in Berlin at age 58.

== Selected works ==
- Schweizer Echolied, Op.21 (a.k.a. Swiss Echo Song), first published 1862
- Das Fischermädchen, singspiel
- Das Käthchen von Nürnberg
- Der Laborant von Riesengebirge, opera
- Scharlatan, opera
- Wilhelm von Oranien, opera
