= A Woman Like Eve =

1979 film by Nouchka van Brakel

- Theatrical release poster
- Dutch: Een vrouw als Eva
- Directed by: Nouchka van Brakel
- Written by: Judith Herzberg; Nouchka van Brakel
- Produced by: Matthijs van Heijningen
- Starring: Monique van de Ven; Maria Schneider; Peter Faber
- Cinematography: Nurit Aviv
- Edited by: Ine Schenkkan
- Music by: Laurens van Rooyen
- Production company: Sigma Film Productions
- Distributed by: Tuschinski Film Distribution
- Release date: 25 January 1979
- Running time: 113 minutes
- Country: Netherlands
- Languages: Dutch; English

A Woman Like Eve (Dutch: Een vrouw als Eva) is a 1979 Dutch drama film directed by Nouchka van Brakel. The film stars Monique van de Ven in the title role of Eve, with Peter Faber as her husband Ad and Maria Schneider as Liliane, who becomes Eve's lover.

The film was selected as the Dutch entry for the Best Foreign Language Film at the 52nd Academy Awards, but was not accepted as a nominee.

== Synopsis ==
After years in a stable marriage, Eve is restless and frustrated, so her husband sends her on a holiday to France, where she meets and falls in love with another woman living in a commune. Eve then decides to leave her husband, and since she has two children, she decides to retain custody of them.

Meanwhile, back home, her ex-husband takes her to court to petition for custody of the children, telling the court she is in a lesbian relationship. Eve does not deny the relationship, and tells the court that the choice of her lover has no relevance to whether she is fit to be a mother. The court accepts her argument, and she is given temporary custody.

When her ex-husband decides to remarry to Eve's best friend, he once again takes her to court, saying that he can now provide the children with a 'proper heterosexual family'. Eve tries to relitigate her previous argument, but the court decides in her ex-husband's favor, and Eve loses custody of the children.

The film ends with Eve preparing to board a train to be with her lesbian lover, but ultimately decides not to leave, instead, she wants to remain close to her children so that she can visit them, so she must remain in the same city. The characters' names are references to the biblical Adam, Eve, and Lilith.

== Cast ==
- Monique van de Ven as Eve
- Maria Schneider as Liliane
- Marijke Merckens as Sonja
- Peter Faber as Ad
- Renée Soutendijk as Sigrid
- Anna Knaup as Britta
- Mike Bendig as Sander
- Truus Dekker as Mom
- Helen van Meurs as Lawyer
- Ben Hulsman as Uncle
- Karin Meerman as Aunt
- Theo de Groot as Uncle
- Trudy de Jong as Aunt
- Marjon Brandsma as Sister
- Elsje Scherjon as Social worker

== Background ==
When asked about why it has taken so long for Americans to produce a film with this subject matter, Monique van de Ven replied:

The Dutch have less of a problem communicating with each other than Americans do. The reason is that we are 14 million people of the same nationality, whereas Americans are many nationalities with 250 million population. We are so compact, we have to communicate to co-exist and it is easier for honest films about social issues to be made. In the U.S. an actor's reputation may be hurt by playing a homosexual.

Van de Ven told the Seattle Gay News that the film had a profound affect on her personal life. She said it was the first movie where she "felt very lonely." She went on to say that it was the first time she was "really involved" in a project, and that she couldn't recall ever putting so much energy into a film mentally. She said it changed her because it is so easy to be judgemental of other women in that situation, and she realized she had "always been in a very good position", where she did not have to rely on other people." She also said she never thought about how hard it must be for women who are "caught up in a marriage with young children and to be stuck in a house and not be able to get out."

In June 1979, Van Brakel recalled at the twelfth annual Motion Picture Seminar of the Northwest in Seattle, that the feminist movement in the Netherlands, was originally opposed to the film, but after its release, they decided to go ahead and accept it.

== Release ==
The film was shown at the 1979 Cannes Film Festival, and was also screened at Filmex '80 in Los Angeles; the San Francisco International Gay Film Festival in 1981; and the fifth annual Chicago Lesbian and Gay Film Festival in 1985. The film was selected as the Dutch entry for the Best Foreign Language Film at the 52nd Academy Awards, but was not accepted as a nominee.

=== Home media ===
The film was released on Blu-ray by Cult Epics in 2021, as part of a three disc box–set of van Brakel's films, with the other two being The Debut from 1977, and The Cool Lakes of Death released in 1982. The set also includes a 2020 interview with van Brakel; contemporary newsreels; trailers and a booklet.

== Reception ==
Lisa DiCaprio wrote in Jump Cut that the film "emphasizes the painful choices that society forces on lesbians, especially on lesbian mothers; it provides us with an engaging drama which illustrates in a compelling way how the dynamics of a lesbian relationship are shaped by the harsh realities of a deeply homophobic society." Sarah Schulman from Gay Community News remarked that it is "perhaps Maria Schneider's worst performance on screen."

Sharan Street of City on a Hill opined that "in its scenes of mothering and lovemaking, the film is enjoyable; in its moments of tension the film comes apart, its dialogue falling as flat as its cardboard characters; the problem is apparent: at these times, it's more cinema of ideas rather than cinema of feelings; the film lacks the dialogue and personal quirks that build character in so short a time, a bit of magic that seems beyond the capabilities of the script." Author Jennifer Stone said it is "not an upbeat film; it is perhaps too sober for American audiences."

Film critic Michael Lasky commented that "the dramatic problems with the film are that it is intermittently cliche bound; most important, since it alienates our interest in the movie, is the extensive amount of time devoted to detailing the expected hysterical reaction of the movie's straight characters to the subject of lesbianism; far too much time is spent on the husband, who finds out his wife not only does not want him, but has no need for his maleness either." Marcia Pally from Film Comment said "the films visual and psychological sophistication can't save it from raveling as the reels run."

In his review for The Sacramento Union, Mick Martin observed "it is greatly lacking in believability; it feigns sensitivity rather than having it and grossly manipulates the audience." Film critic Harry Sutherland wrote in The Body Politic, "the film's pace is slowed by poor direction and almost ruined by Maria Schneider's acting; whatever valid emotional points might be inherent in the original material are blunted by the unbelievable and unpleasant characters."

== See also ==
- Cinema of the Netherlands
- List of Dutch films of the 1970s
- List of LGBTQ-related films of 1979
- List of feature films with lesbian characters
- List of submissions to the 52nd Academy Awards for Best Foreign Language Film
- List of Dutch submissions for the Academy Award for Best Foreign Language Film
