= Ciske de Rat (1984 film) =

1984 film by Guido Pieters

- Theatrical release poster
- Directed by: Guido Pieters
- Screenplay by: Karin Loomans
- Based on: Ciske de Rat by Piet Bakker
- Produced by: Matthijs van Heijningen
- Starring: Danny de Munk; Willeke van Ammelrooy
- Cinematography: Frans Bromet
- Edited by: Ton Ruys
- Music by: Erik van der Wurff
- Production company: Sigma Film Productions
- Distributed by: Concorde Film
- Release date: 29 March 1984
- Running time: 107 minutes
- Country: Netherlands
- Language: Dutch
- Box office: 1.6 million admissions (Netherlands)

Ciske de Rat is a 1984 Dutch drama film directed by Guido Pieters, based on the novel of the same name by Piet Bakker. Ciske is played by 13-year-old Danny de Munk who also sang the title song Ik voel me zo verdomd alleen ("I feel so damned alone") which scored a number one hit in the Netherlands. In 1985 the film won a UNICEF Award at the Berlin International Film Festival. With more than 1.5 million admissions it was one of the most successful Dutch films of all time although did not surpass the 1955 version. Two years later, an extended version of the film was turned into a four-episode TV series.

== Plot ==
Ciske, nicknamed the rat, grows up in 1930s Amsterdam as a street-kid in need of parental love. Because his seaman father Cor is largely absent, he is forced to live with his mother Marie who abuses him. Ciske has been expelled from a few schools till he joins Master Bruis' class; Bruis manages to win Ciske's trust and make him feel at ease. Meanwhile, Cor begins a relationship with laundry lady Aunt Jans, fuelling Ciske's hope of a better future than at home with his mother. Marie refuses to cooperate in a divorce, not to mention Bruis' application for guardianship. Instead, she chooses to destroy a present (a copy of Gulliver's Travels) that Ciske got from his one friend Dorus who was terminally ill. Ciske retaliates by grabbing a knife and stabbing his mother to death. Ciske is sentenced to detention, struggling to survive among elder inmates. Upon his release, everyone has gone off him; even Aunt Jans, by cancelling her wedding because she does not want to build a future on someone else's loss. All ends well when Ciske saves a bullying classmate from drowning; he is welcomed back at school. Cor and Aunt Jans make amends and decide to marry after all.

== Cast ==
- Danny de Munk as Ciske Vrijmoeth / Ciske de Rat
- Willeke van Ammelrooy as Mother Marie
- Herman van Veen as Master Bruis
- Willem Nijholt as Uncle Henri
- Peter Faber as Father Cor
- Rijk de Gooyer as Detective Muyskens
- Carolien van den Berg as Aunt Chris
- Linda van Dyck as Aunt Jans

== See also ==
- Ciske de Rat (original novel and musical)
- Ciske de Rat
