= De Vriendschap =

2001 film

- Theatrical release poster
- Directed by: Nouchka van Brakel
- Produced by: Matthijs van Heijningen
- Starring: Gerard Cox
- Cinematography: Peter De Bont
- Edited by: Edgar Burcksen
- Music by: Ruud Bos
- Production companies: Sigma Pictures Productions; AVRO
- Distributed by: United International Pictures
- Release date: 14 June 2001
- Running time: 117 minutes
- Country: Netherlands
- Language: Dutch

De Vriendschap is a 2001 Dutch drama film directed by Nouchka van Brakel.
