= Mijn Stad =

Single by Danny de Munk

from the album Danny de Munk
- B-side: "Vergeet nu maar je zorgen"
- Released: 1984
- Genre: Levenslied
- Length: 3:10
- Label: RCA
- Songwriter: Karin Loomans
- Producer: Jurre Haanstra

Danny de Munk singles chronology
"Ik voel me zo verdomd alleen" (1984)	"Mijn Stad" (1984)	"Mijn meissie" (1985)

"Mijn stad" is a song by Danny de Munk. It is the eleventh track of his 1985 self-titled debut Danny de Munk, the B-side to the single was "Vergeet nu maar je zorgen" (English: Forget your worries). It was the follow-up single to his debut "Ik voel me zo verdomd alleen" (English: I feel so damn lonely); the lead single from the soundtrack from a feature film in which he starred, titled Ciske de Rat from 1984.

The song is an ode to Amsterdam, Danny de Munk's hometown in which he was born and raised.

The song is frequently heard at the Amsterdam Arena during home matches of AFC Ajax the local football club from the city.
