= Ciske the Rat (1955 film) =

1955 film

- Directed by: Wolfgang Staudte
- Written by: Wolfgang Staudte
- Based on: novel by Piet Bakker
- Produced by: Hans Boekman and Co ter Linden
- Music by: Steye van Brandenberg; Herbert Windt
- Distributed by: Filmproductie Maatschappij Amsterdam
- Release date: 7 October 1955
- Running time: 97 minutes
- Countries: Netherlands; West Germany
- Language: Dutch
- Budget: 275.000 gulden
- Box office: 2,432,500 admissions (Netherlands)

Ciske the Rat (Dutch: Ciske de Rat) is a 1955 Dutch drama film directed by Wolfgang Staudte, based on the Ciske trilogy by Piet Bakker. The film was remade in 1984 and turned into a popular musical in 2007.

With 2,433,000 viewers it was the most popular Dutch film of all-time until surpassed a few years later by Fanfare. The film was shown at the Venice Film Festival, where it won a Silver Lion of San Marco. It has also received an honorable mention from the Office Catholique Internationale du Cinéma.

A German version has been made with other actors, titled Ciske: Ein Kind braucht Liebe (Ciske: A Child Needs Love).

== Plot ==
The story is set in the Amsterdam of the 30s, and told from the perspective of a teacher named Bruis. The narrative is centered around Cis Vrijmoeth, an oaf who never sees his father, because he is a sailor, and who is neglected by his mother. Time after time he is expelled from school. Only teacher Bruis can really handle and restrain the boy. In n fit of rage and fear, Ciske kills his mother with a knife and is sent to a youth detention center. In the end, his father returns from the sea and decides to take care of him, together with his wife Aunt Jans.

== Cast ==
- Dick van der Velde ... Ciske
- Kees Brusse ... teacher Bruis
- Jenny Van Maerlant ... Ciske's mother
- Riek Schagen ... Aunt Jans
- Lies Franken ... Suus Bruis
- Bernhard Droog ... Leraar
- Rob de Vries ... Ciske's father
- Cees Laseur ... Dhr. Van Loon
- Paul Steenbergen ... Teacher Maatsuyker
- Jan Teulings ... Henri - friend of Mother
- Guus Oster ... Officier van Justitie
- Hans Tiemeyer ... Reinders
- Joan Remmelts ... Kapelaan de Goey
- Tjeerd de Vries .... Jantje Verkerk (bully)
- Heidi Schmidt ... Betje (Ciske's girlfriend)

== See also ==
- Ciske de Rat (1984 film)
