= Coby Timp =

Dutch actress (1930–2025)

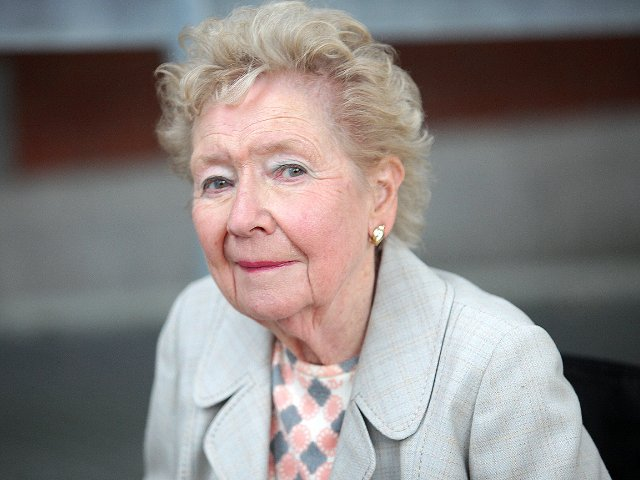
- Timp in 2013
- Born: Jacoba Toele; 18 May 1930; Amsterdam
- Died: 23 September 2025 (aged 95); Laren, North Holland
- Years active: 1974–2025

Jacoba (Coby) Timp (nee Toele; 18 May 1930 – 23 September 2025) was a Dutch actress.

== Biography ==
Coby Timp was born in 1930 on the Haarlemmerweg in Amsterdam and remained an only child. Later, the family moved to Tuindorp. At the age of 7, she discovered she had a passion for acting. The teacher asked who could imitate the proud walk of Puss in Boots. Timp: "I never really said anything, but then I raised my hand. And there I was, walking between the benches, waving my hat; very proud. I felt the attention of the other children and then I knew: this is what I want." When her mother discovered that Timp was practicing facial expressions in the mirror, she covered the mirrors in the house with tape.

Her mother said that acting wasn't a profession and wasn't polite. So Timp became a kindergarten teacher and was forced to do amateur theater. She married Frans Timp, who died in 2023 at the age of 99. The couple were together for 65 years. "Frans treated me to a sour bomb, and I fell in love immediately." The couple had two sons.

Timp moved to the Rosa Spier Huis in the spring of 2025. On September 23, at the age of 95, she died. She was buried at the De Nieuwe Ooster cemetery in Amsterdam.

== Career ==
Timp performed amateur theatre with the De Toetssteen company in Amsterdam. Someone from the Ro Theater came to see her and asked her for a role. She was fifty at the time. Timp: "I was so lucky. I immediately went from one role to the next".

Timp started acting for television in the role of Nora Daniël in Goede tijden, slechte tijden. After that she ended up in Het Zonnetje in Huis as the strange upstairs neighbor De Vries. In Toen was geluk heel gewoon (When happiness was very common) she played Svetlana van den Broek, the hard of hearing landlady of bus driver Henk van de Berg. She also appeared regularly in Zeg 'ns AAA (Say 'ns AAA) . In 2009 she played the role of Nel Kalkman in the new series of Zeg 'ns Aaa (Say 'ns Aaa). In 2014 she played the mother-in-law of Jaap Kooiman (Gerard Cox) in the film Toen was geluk heel gewoon (When happiness was very common). She played the role of Grietje in the series Het geheime dagboek van Hendrik Groen (The Secret Diary of Hendrik Groen) (2017/2019).

=== Theater ===
In the theatre adaptations of the comedy series Zeg 'ns Aaa (season 2003/2004: Zeg 'ns Aaa and season 2007/2008: With the assistant of doctor Van der Ploeg! ) Timp played the role of Nel Kalkman, the mother of Mien Dobbelsteen. In the online TheaterEncyclopedie Timp is mentioned in 16 productions.

== Filmography ==
- De vloek van Woestewolf - Patiënt (1974)
- Spetters (1980)
- De lift - Receptioniste (1983)
- Zoeken naar Eileen - Toiletjuffrouw (1987)
- Ei - Moeder (1988)
- De wandelaar - Mevrouw Mol (1989)
- Den Haag vandaag: ofwel een avond lang lachen - Nel Dekker-Muk (1989)
- De brug - Gertie (1990)
- Romeo - Moeder (1990)
- Vreemde praktijken - Tante Constance (1990)
- 12 steden, 13 ongelukken - Els Michels/Moeder/Bep (1990, 1991, 1994, 1996)
- Op leven en dood (1992)
- Zonder Ernst - Mies (1992)
- Goede tijden, slechte tijden - Nora Daniël (1992-1995) (Terugkerende gastrol, 75 afl.)
- Ha, die Pa! - Oma Lagerveen (1993)
- Bureau Kruislaan (1993)
- Oppassen!!! - Mevrouw Beel (1993)
- Pleidooi - Moeder Wesseling (1994)
- Coverstory - Mevrouw Rielink (1995)
- Het Zonnetje in Huis - Mevrouw de Vries (1995-2003)
- Baantjer - Mevrouw Spaans (1996)
- Woensdag gehaktdag - Oude vrouw (1996)
- Toen was geluk heel gewoon - Hospita van Henk (1996-2001)
- Wij Alexander - Buurvrouw (1998)
- Kees & Co - Dora van Dam (1998-2000)
- Wildschut & De Vries - Mrs. Schoenmaker (2000)
- Wet & Waan - Oude vrouw (2001)
- Echt waar - Oma (2002)
- Lot - Oma (2003)
- Escort - Mevrouw Timmers (2006)
- Vuurzee - Mevrouw Koningsbergen (2006)
- Van Speijk - Mevrouw Eberhart (2006)
- Keyzer & De Boer Advocaten - Mevrouw Ellenbroek (2006)
- Afdwalen (2006)
- Jef - Oude vrouw (2006)
- Basta - Mama (2007)
- SUPERGRANNY - Oude vrouw (2007)
- Zeg 'ns Aaa - Nel Kalkman (2009)
- Lege maag (2009)
- De co-assistent - Mevrouw Engels (2009)
- Flikken Maastricht - Gerda Brink (2010)
- Dokter Deen - An (2012)
- Oom Henk - Mevrouw van Andel (2012)
- Brammetje Baas - Oud vrouwtje in park (2012)
- Urfeld - Adrie (2012)
- Dokter Tinus - Anna van Huijm (2013)
- Toen was geluk heel gewoon - Lea van Vliet (2014)
- Popoz - Oude vrouw (2014)
- Kamer aangeboden - Mevrouw Blom (2015)
- Brasserie Valentijn - Mevrouw Hendriks (2016)
- De mannen van dokter Anne - Ria Smits (2016)
- Het geheime dagboek van Hendrik Groen - Grietje (2017 & 2019)
- SpangaS Special - Jannie (2019)
- De regels van Floor - bewoner verzorgingstehuis (2020)
- Wheelie - Oma Paprika (2025)
