= Peter Faber (actor) =

Dutch stage, television and film actor (1943–2026)

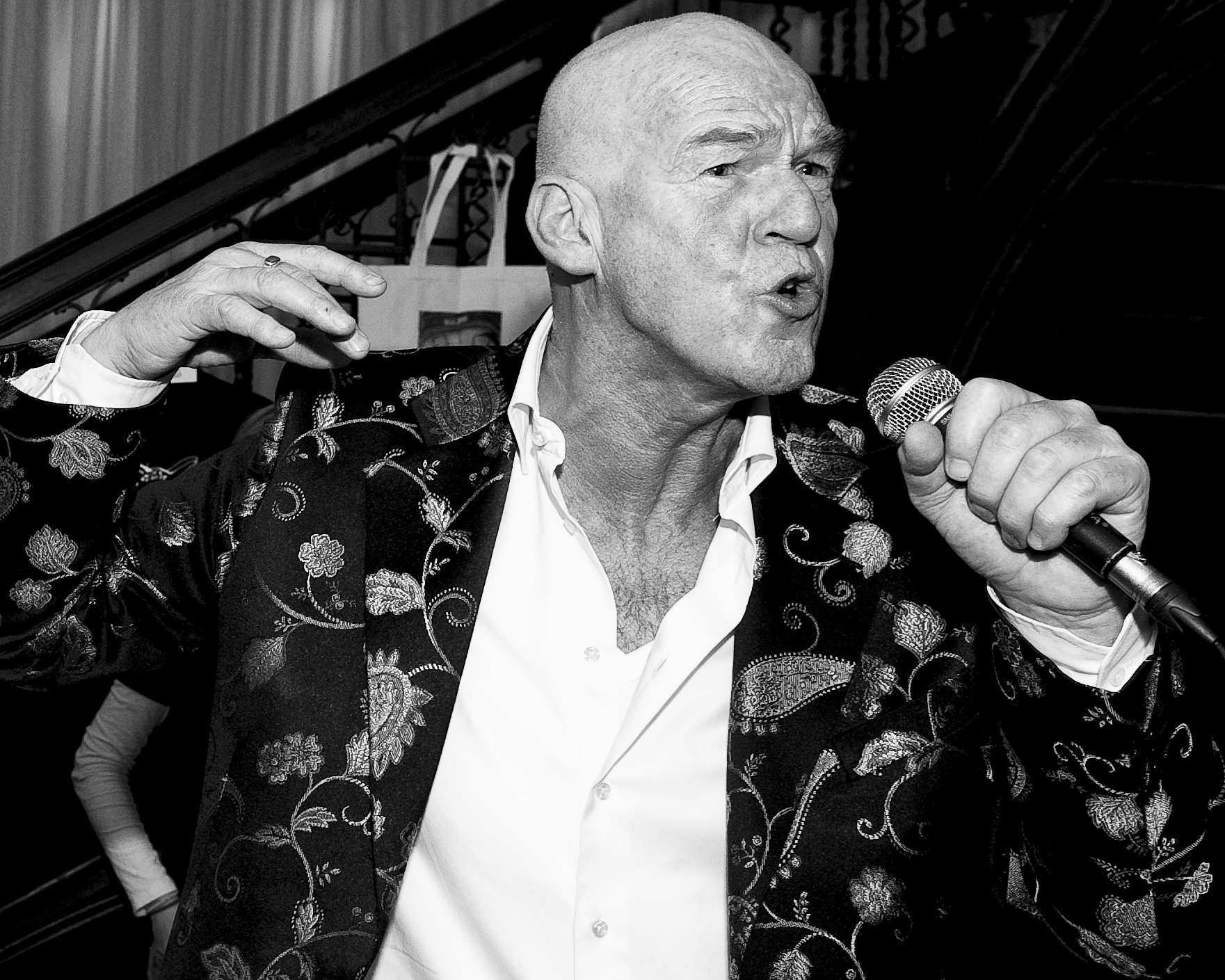
- Faber in 2010
- Born: 9 October 1943; Schwarzenbach an der Saale, Gau Bayreuth, Germany
- Died: 6 August 2026 (aged 82)
- Occupation: Actor
- Years active: 1948; 1960–2025

Peter Faber (9 October 1943 – 6 August 2026) was a Dutch stage, television and film actor.

== Early life ==
Faber was born in Schwarzenbach an der Saale, in Gau Bayreuth on 9 October 1943. His Dutch father met his German mother in Hamburg during World War II. They fled from the Allied bombardments to Southern Germany. His parents beat him regularly and he was rebellious from an early age. They moved to Amsterdam-Noord when he was six. His mother left with another man, and his father had to make do working whatever job was available. At sixteen, Faber left home and roamed around for a while.

== Career ==
Faber was co-founder of Het Werkteater and twice won a Louis d'Or for his roles in Het Koekoeksnest and Avondrood. International audiences may know Faber from the star-studded fîlm A Bridge Too Far or Paul Verhoeven's internationally successful war epic Soldier of Orange. He also played in Max Havelaar. In the 1980s Faber starred as John Gisberts in Dutch box office hit Schatjes! and its sequel Mama is boos!.

He played in the musical De Jantjes (1998), as Captain Hook in the musical Peter Pan. In 2007 he performed in his one man show Caveman and in the children's show Elk kind is Kampioen!. In 2018, Faber had a leading role in the RTL 4 alternative comedy series Beter Laat Dan Nooit, where he travels around the world with other Dutch celebrities, including Gerard Cox, Willibrord Frequin, and Barrie Stevens.

== Later life and death ==
Faber taught at the Amsterdamse Theaterschool, de Kleinkunst Academie and the Frank Sanders Musical Academie.

Peter Faber died on 6 August 2026, at the age of 82.

== Filmography, television and theatre ==
- Warning to Wantons (1948) – Unknown part (not credited)
- Makkers staakt uw wild geraas (1960) – Unknown part
- La ragazza in vetrina (1961) – Unknown part
- Surprise Surprise (1969) – Lover
- De worstelaar (1970) – Unknown part
- Keetje Tippel (1975) – George
- Rooie Sien (1975) – Gerrit van Buren
- Mens erger je niet (1975) – Unknown part
- De laatste trein (1975) – Unknown part
- Toestanden (1976) – Unknown part
- Alle dagen feest (1976) – Wessel Franken
- Max Havelaar (1976) – Max Havelaar
- Dokter Vlimmen (1977) – Dokter Vlimmen
- A Bridge Too Far (1977) – Capt. Harry Bestebreurtje
- Soldier of Orange (1977) – Will Dostgaarde
- Prettig weekend, meneer Meijer (television film, 1978) – Unknown part
- Mysteries (1978) – Karlsen
- Exit 7 (1978) – Marc Dumont
- Camping (1978) – Guus
- De proefkonijnen (1979) – Herman
- A Woman Like Eve (1979) – Ad
- Mijn vriend (1979) – Jules Depraeter
- Duel in de diepte television series – El Loco (1979)
- Het teken van het beest (1980) – Dirk Tabak
- Charlotte (1981) – Frits Blech
- Te gek om los te lopen (1981) – Piet
- Van de koele meren des doods (1982) – Joop
- Een zaak van leven of dood (1983) – Hans Jansonius
- De wil voor de werkelijkheid (1984) – Unknown part
- Schatjes! (1984) – John Gisberts
- Ciske de Rat (1984) – Father Cor
- Paul Chevrolet en de ultieme hallucinatie (1985) – Leopold/Paul Chevrolet
- Mama is Boos! (1986) – John Gisberts
- Grijpstra en de Gier 2: De Ratelrat (1987) – De Gier
- Mijn vader woont in Rio (1989) – Jacob
- De Gulle Minnaar (1990) – Peter Heg
- Prettig geregeld television series – Joris Huisman (1988–1991)
- Van Gogh's Ear (1992) – Nico
- Heading for England (1993) – Father of Hans
- Oeroeg (1993) – Van Bergen Henegouwen
- De club television series – Club owner (1995)
- De zeemeerman (1996) – Simon
- Flodder television series – Bob (Episode: Inzet, 1997)
- Windkracht 10 television series – Willem (Episode: Geen zee te hoog, 1997)
- Baantjer television series – Felix Wolf (Episode: De Cock en de moord op het menu, 1997)
- Baantjer, de film: De Cock en de wraak zonder einde (television film, 1999) – Donald Heerooms
- Verkeerd verbonden television series – Theo (Episode: Twee op de wip, 2000)
- Onderweg naar morgen television series – Melchior Vehmeijer (2001)
- Séance (2004) – Hypnotist
- K3 en het ijsprinsesje (2006) – King Flurkentijn
- M.A.N. (2007) – Unknown part
- De kleine prins family theatre (2007) – Pilot
- Van Speijk television series (2006–2007) – Detective Evert Beukering (23 afl.)
- Piet Piraat en het zwaard van Zilvertand (2008) – Kapitein Eksteroog
- De Man van La Mancha musical (2008–2009) – Don Quixote
- De Magische Wereld van Pardoes television series (2011) – Grootmeester Almar
- New Kids Nitro (2011) – Minister of Defence
- Redbad (2018)
- Sweet Dreams (2023)
