= Van de koele meren des doods =

Dutch novel

- Cover of the Dutch 1900 edition
- Author: Frederik van Eeden
- Language: Dutch
- Subject: Woman
- Genre: Naturalism, psychological novel
- Publication date: 1900
- Media type: Print
- ISBN: 90-214-9554-6
- OCLC: 63446706
- Dewey Decimal: 839.3
- LC Class: PT5831 .V3 1900

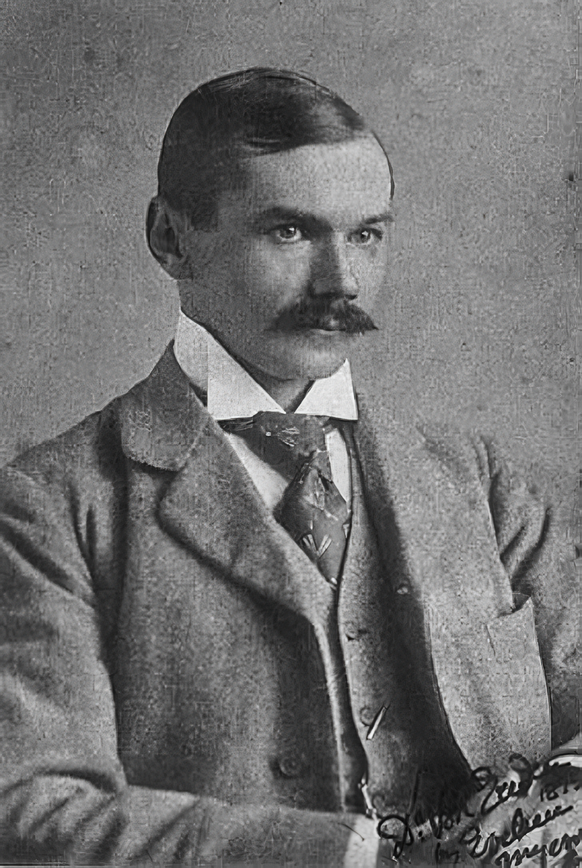
Frederik van Eeden (1860–1932)

Van de koele meren des doods (translated in English as The Deeps of Deliverance or Hedwig's Journey, literally Of the cold lakes of death) is a Dutch novel by Frederik van Eeden, first published in 1900. It is one of the canonical Dutch novels, and is praised for its representation of the female protagonist; the novel established van Eeden as a "master of the psychological novel." A 1982 movie was based on the novel.

== Plot ==
The novel relates the story of Hedwig Marga de Fontayne, the scion of a wealthy family, whose sexual frustration manifests itself as a death drive. After the death of her mother her father turns alcoholic, wasting the family's fortune. She begins to fantasize about sex and becomes a habitual masturbator, something she feels guilty about. At nineteen, Hedwig marries a man named Gerard. Gerard hardly ever has sex with her, and only out of a sense of obligation. Hedwig gets depressed. When Hedwig, on advice of her doctor, spends some time apart from Gerard, she meets and falls in love with Ritsaard, a piano player, with whom she runs off to England. Out of this relationship a daughter is born, but she dies quickly. Hedwig gets increasingly confused, till she completely loses her grip on reality. She travels to Paris with the dead child in a suitcase. There she's brought to a psychiatric hospital, where she's treated with morphine. She gets addicted to it, and after her release she becomes a prostitute to support her addiction. Destitute and descending into madness, she is admitted to the Pitié-Salpêtrière Hospital, to the psychiatric ward where a friendly nurse helps her beat her addiction. She returns to the Netherlands, and spends her last years with a family that formerly farmed on the family's lands.

== Reception and criticism ==
The novel was initially thought to be a case description of one of van Eeden's patients. Van Eeden, who was a psychiatrist, denied this in a preface to the second edition. The book was praised for its psychological realism by Henricus Cornelius Rümke, a well-known Dutch psychiatrist, who also pointed out that the main character has a mystical side to her. A Dutch literary critic recognizes medieval mystic Hadewych (of which "Hedwig" is a variant) in some of the book's passages, especially a dream sequence early in Hedwig's life (in the dream she is called "Hadewij").

While literary critic Ton Anbeek, who has written extensively on the subject of the naturalistic novel, did classify Van de koele meren as naturalistic, he noted that the novel did not meet all seven of his defining characteristics for a naturalistic novel: the novel contains no instances of erlebte Rede, and the positive ending (the "salvation" of Hedwig) is "of course completely un-naturalistic." Another way in which van Eeden does not follow naturalistic tradition is that he "completely and consciously ignored the influence of hereditary factors." Indeed, according to one critic, the novel sets out to prove that "people are capable of changing their destiny."

The novel's position on women's sexuality and the sexual education of women has been studied extensively. Dutch critic Hannemieke Stamperius, for instance, saw in one of Hedwig's dreams a critique of the repressive way in which contemporary women were given sexual education. In an article published in Dutch feminist magazine Opzij, Stamperius praised Van de koele meren as one of the most beautiful novels with a female protagonist written by a man.

== Adaptations and translations ==
A movie of the same name was made by Nouchka van Brakel, starring Renée Soutendijk. The novel was translated into English and published in 1974 as The Deeps of Deliverance, and again in 2009 as Hedwig's Journey.
