= De Gulle Minnaar =

1990 Dutch comedy film

- DVD cover
- Directed by: Mady Saks
- Written by: Marjan Berk
- Produced by: Rob Houwer
- Starring: Peter Faber; Mariska Van Kolck
- Cinematography: Frans Broment
- Music by: Henny Vrienten
- Release date: 6 July 1990
- Running time: 100 minutes
- Country: Netherlands
- Language: Dutch

De Gulle Minnaar is a 1990 Dutch comedy drama film directed by Mady Saks. It revolves around the romantic entanglements of a graphic designer who becomes involved with the mothers of his son's classmates, before finally meeting his ideal partner.

== Cast ==
- Peter Faber as Peter Heg
- Mariska Van Kolck as Mascha Silman
- Ella van Drumpt as Kiki
- Ian Smith as Tommie
- Lieneke le Roux as Oekje
- Sylvia Millecam as Hedda
- Adèle Bloemendaal as Pina Overgauw
- Herbert Flack as Jimmy
- Maarten Spanjer as Freek
- Rik Launspach as Lucas
- Frank Groothof as Freddy
- Lex de Regt as Kalewijn
- Hans Beijer as Van der Leeuw (as Hans Beyer)
- Hester van de Vijver as Beatrijs
- Sylvie Allard as Jessica
