= Iris (1987 film) =

- Directed by: Mady Saks
- Written by: Felix Thijssen
- Produced by: Roger Corman
- Starring: Monique van de Ven
- Distributed by: Concorde Film
- Release date: 1987
- Running time: 90 minutes
- Country: Netherlands
- Language: Dutch

Iris is a 1987 Netherlands film directed by Mady Saks and starring Monique van de Ven.

== Plot ==
A young woman, Iris, runs away to the big city on her eighteenth birthday. She moves in with an architect and decides to become a veterinarian. With an inheritance she buys an existing clinic in a backwoods town where Iris is leered at by the men, scorned by the women. Cruel jokes and gossip eventually lead to violence. A local thug breaks in her house while she is out. When she returns home late night, he attacks her, drag her to the wooden stairs, ties her hands, stretch her legs wide apart and ties to the railing of stairs and rapes her brutally.
