= A Month Later =

1987 Dutch comedy film

- Theatrical release poster
- Directed by: Nouchka van Brakel
- Written by: Nouchka van Brakel
- Produced by: Matthijs van Heijningen
- Starring: Renée Soutendijk; Monique van de Ven; Edwin de Vries; Jean-Yves Berteloot; Bas Voets; Sunny Bergman
- Cinematography: Peter de Bont
- Edited by: Edgar Burcksen
- Music by: Rob van Donselaar
- Production company: Sigma Filmproductions
- Distributed by: Warner Bros.
- Release date: 17 September 1987
- Running time: 102 minutes
- Country: Netherlands
- Language: Dutch

A Month Later (Dutch: Een maand later), also known as One Month Later, is a 1987 Dutch comedy film directed by Nouchka van Brakel, starring Renée Soutendijk and Monique van de Ven as two women who switch their identites for a month. The film was released in the Netherlands on 17 September 1987 by Warner Bros.

== Cast ==
- Renée Soutendijk as Liesbeth
- Monique van de Ven as Monika
- Jean-Yves Berteloot as Hugo
- Bas Voets as Steffie
- Sunny Bergman as Judith

== Release ==
It was the twelfth highest-grossing film in the Netherlands for the year and the second most popular Dutch film after Flodder.

=== Home media ===
The film was released on DVD by Warner Home Video on 13 July 2005.
