= Danny de Munk =

Dutch actor (born 1970)

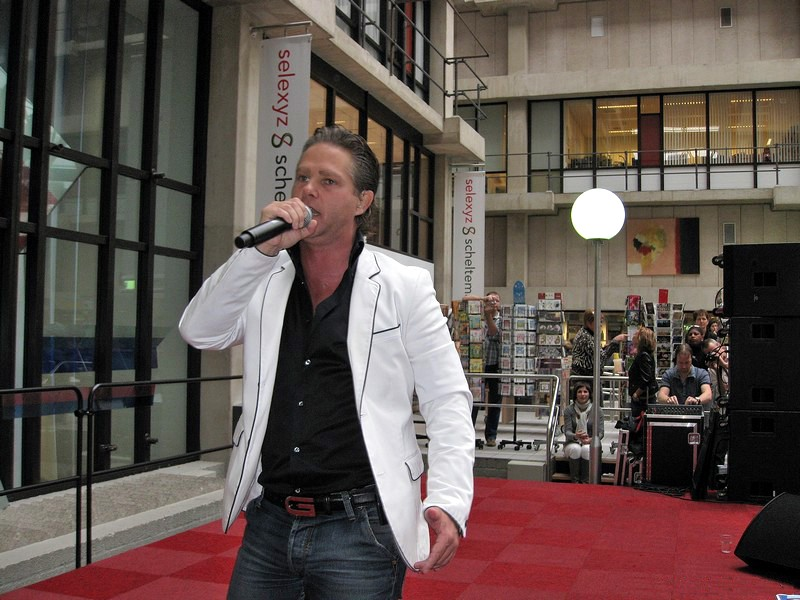
- Born: 19 February 1970 (age 56); Amsterdam, Netherlands
- Occupations: Actor, singer
- Spouse: Jenny Sluyter (1998 to date)
- Children: Daughter and son
- Website: www.dannydemunk.nl

Dennis "Danny" de Munk (born 19 February 1970 in Amsterdam) is a Dutch actor, singer, musical actor and former child star.

== Career ==
De Munk started acting at the age of 13 as the leading role in the film Ciske de Rat (Ciske the Rat), directed by Guido Pieters, starring Herman van Veen as teacher and Willeke van Ammelrooy as mother. The coming of age trilogy (book) was written by Piet Bakker from 1941 to 1946.

The title song of the film Ik voel me zo verdomd alleen was also sung by Danny de Munk and in 1984 scored a number one hit in the Dutch Top 40 and stayed there for 14 weeks (3 weeks number one).

Between 1986 and 1991 he had successfully continued acting and singing, but started 1991 a career as musical actor. In 1995 Danny de Munk covered Thomas Anders' (of Modern Talking fame) song How Deep Is Your Love for the album Danny. In 1997 he played a homosexual in a soccer team in the film All Stars. He is still singing and has an own stage program.

In September 2018, Danny released his single Toch ff Lekker Zo. He appeared in the 2024 season of the television show The Masked Singer.

== Personal life ==
De Munk has been married since 1998 and has a daughter and a son.

On 25 April 2008 Danny de Munk was made a knight of the Order of Orange-Nassau.

== Discography ==
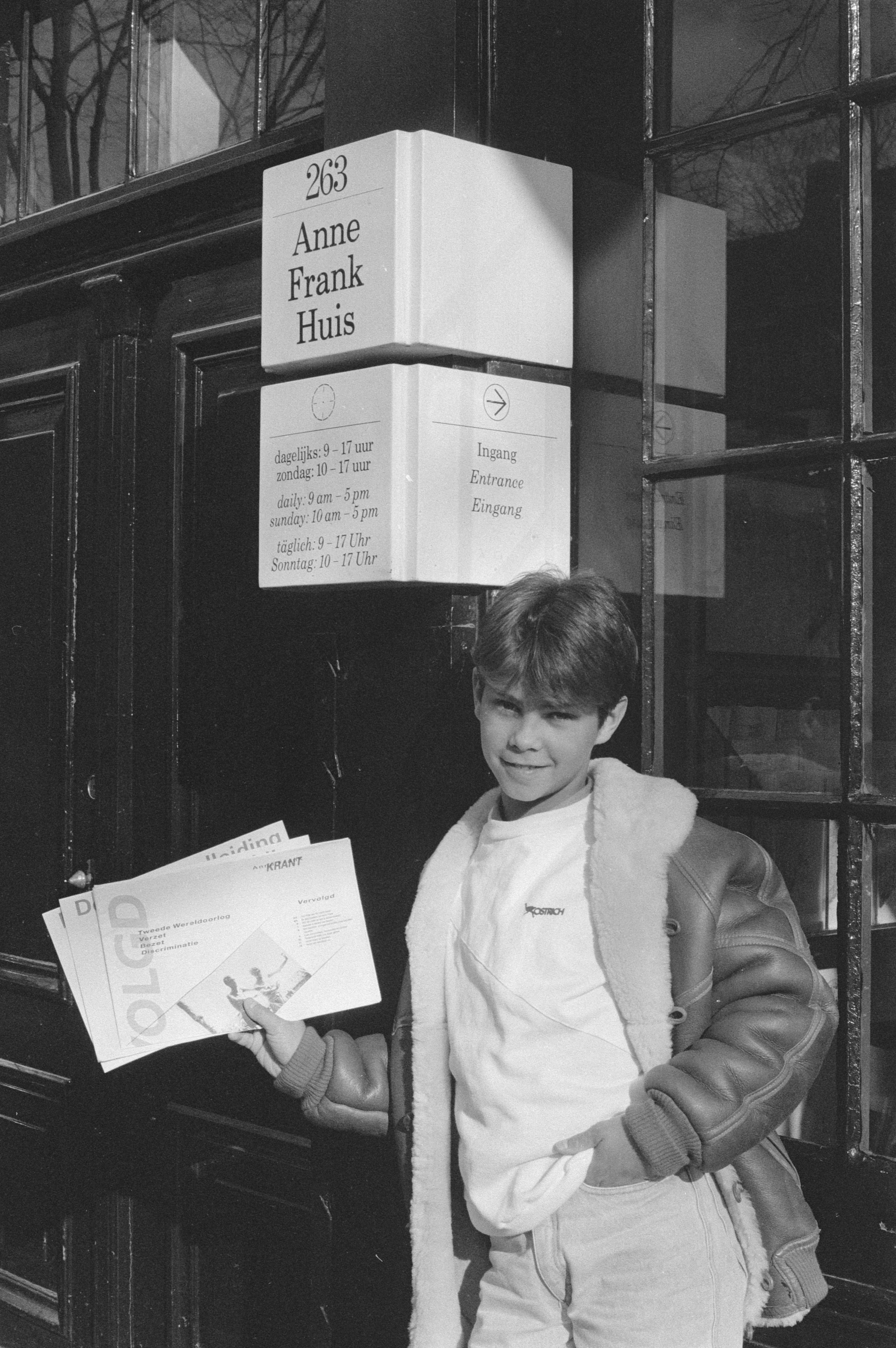
Danny de Munk in 1985

=== Albums ===
- 1985: Danny de Munk
- 1987: 'N Jaar Later
- 1989: Geen Wereld Zonder Jou
- 1995: Danny
- 2007: Hart en Ziel
- 2010: Dit is mijn leven

=== Singles ===
- 1984: "Ik voel me zo verdomd alleen..."
- 1984: "Mijn stad"
- 1985: "Mijn meissie"
- 1985: "Mengelmoes"
- 1985: "Met Kerstmis hoor je blij te zijn"
- 1986: "Ratsmodee"
- 1987: "Amsterdam laat je niet kisten"
- 1987: "Als jij maar bij me bent"
- 1989: "Twee lege handen"
- 1991: "Vrienden voor het leven"
- 1992: "Onbeschrijfelijk mooi"
- 2008: "Het levende bewijs"
- 2008: "Laat ons niet alleen" (with Dave)
- 2009: "Bloemetje"
- 2010: "Dit is mijn leven"
- 2010: "Kontje"
- 2012: "We brullen voor oranje" (feat DJ Galaga)
- 2013: "Tuig van de richel"
- 2014: "De beuk erin oranje" (Danny de Munk vs. Tony Star)
- 2014: "Ze wacht nog steeds op mij"
- 2018: "Toch ff Lekker Zo"

Featured in

- 2013: "Zo verdomd alleen" (Lil' Kleine feat. Danny de Munk)

Collective

- 1987: "S.O.S. Mozambique" (Dutch Artists Sing For Mozambique)

Film and television

- 1984: Ciske de Rat (soundtrack)
- 1994: "Vrienden voor het Leven" (theme song for a Dutch sitcom)

== Filmography ==
- 1984: Ciske de Rat
- 1985: Danny Dubbel (television documentary, featuring Ciske and Danny, performing songs from his first record)
- 1986: Op hoop van zegen, also the song "Ratsmodee"
- 1988: De Vuurdoop
- 1993: Vrouwenvleugel (TV series)
- 1997: All Stars
- 2011: Old Stars

== Musical ==
- Ciske de Rat (musical, 2009)

Selected musicals

- Les Misérables (musical, as Marius, 1991)
- Cyrano: The Musical
- Tsjechov (musical)
- Pump boys and dinettes (musical)
- Elisabeth (musical)
- De Tijdaffaire (musical for Rabobank)
- Copacabana (musical)
- De Jantjes (musical)
- The Lion King
- The Wiz (musical)
- Ciske de Rat (musical, as grown-up Ciske, 2007–2009)

== Bibliography ==
- Holmstrom, John. The Moving Picture Boy: An International Encyclopaedia from 1895 to 1995. Norwich, Michael Russell, 1996, p. 378.
