= Breathless (1982 film) =

1982 film

- Theatrical release poster
- Directed by: Mady Saks
- Written by: Mady Saks
- Produced by: Roeland Kerbosch
- Starring: Monique van de Ven; Linda van Dyck
- Cinematography: Cees Samson
- Edited by: Hans van Dongen
- Music by: Lodewijk de Boer
- Distributed by: Tuschinski Film Distribution
- Release date: 28 October 1982
- Running time: 90 minutes
- Country: Netherlands
- Language: Dutch

Breathless (Dutch: Ademloos) is a 1982 Dutch drama film directed by Mady Saks. It was entered into the 13th Moscow International Film Festival.

== Plot summary ==
After the difficult birth of their first child, Anneke and Leo Broekman move to Almere, where Anneke becomes addicted to calming pills. After an attempted suicide, she is admitted to a psychiatric clinic.

== Cast ==
- Coen Bennink as Verpleger
- Bobby Boermans as Bobo
- Theu Boermans as Dokter
- Ursul de Geer as Van Poppel
- Frouke Fokkema as Verpleegster
- Pieter Groenier as Leo
- Cora Hollema as Patiente
- Maarten Kouwenhoven as Therapeut
- Marie Louise Stheins as Pauline
- Monique van de Ven as Anneke
- Ina van der Molen as Agaath
- Linda van Dyck as Martha
- Olga Zuiderhoek as Moeder
