= Casa Coco =

2022 Dutch film directed by Bob Wilbers

- Theatrical release poster
- Directed by: Bob Wilbers
- Starring: Gerard Cox; Joke Bruijs; Katja Schuurman
- Distributed by: WW Entertainment
- Release date: 7 November 2022 (Netherlands)
- Country: Netherlands
- Language: Dutch

Casa Coco is a 2022 Dutch comedy film directed by Bob Wilbers. The film won the Golden Film award after having sold 100,000 tickets. It was the twelfth best visited Dutch film of 2022 with just over 113,000 visitors.

Gerard Cox, Joke Bruijs and Katja Schuurman are among the cast of the film. Principal photography began in February 2021 in Bonaire. Filming also took place in Rotterdam, Netherlands.
