= Frits Landesbergen =

Dutch jazz drummer and vibraphonist (born 1961)

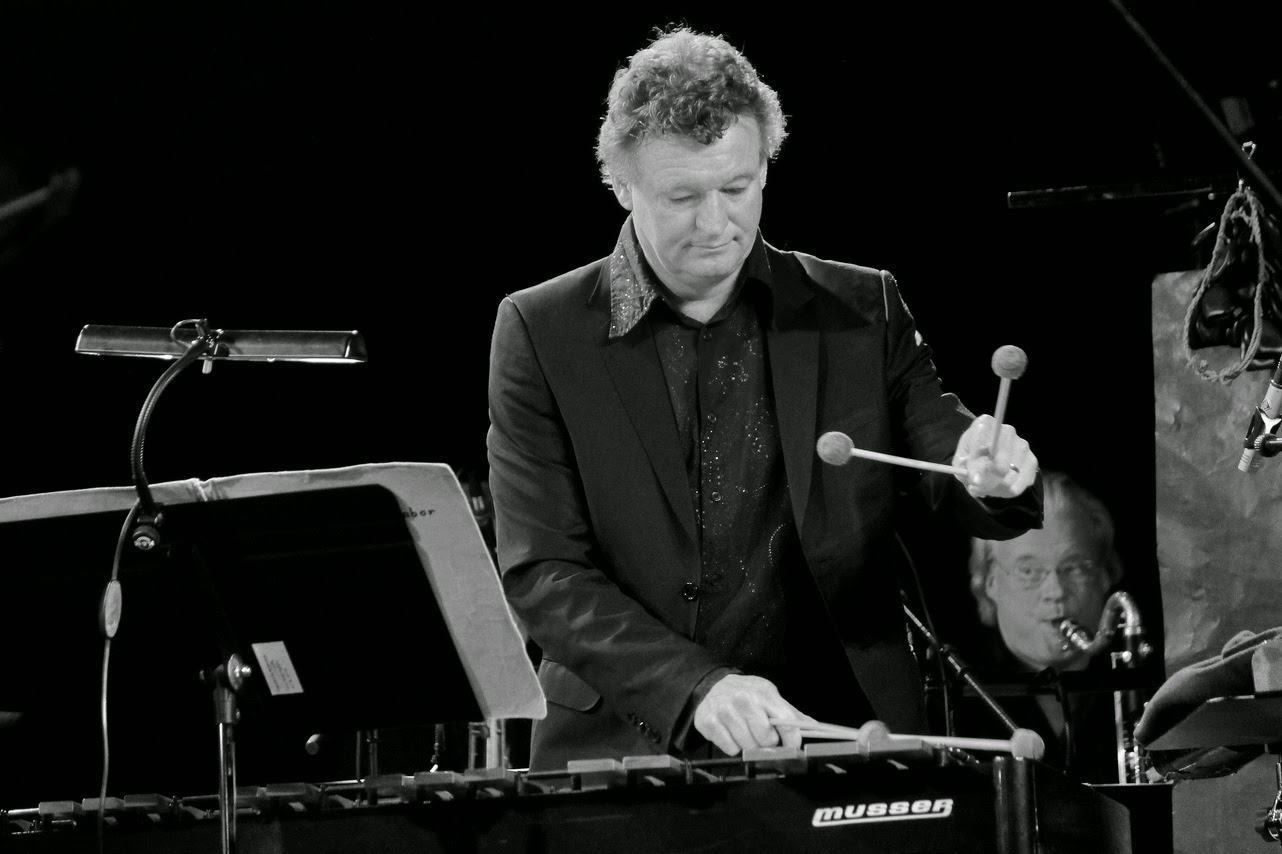
Landesbergen performing in 2015

Frits Landesbergen (born 1961 in Voorschoten) is a Dutch jazz drummer and vibraphonist.

== Private life ==
Since about 2003 he had been in a relationship with Joke Bruijs. They made an album together and his marriage was ending and her marriage had ended. He is younger by eleven years.
