= Alle dagen feest =

1976 film

- Theatrical release poster
- Directed by: Ate de Jong, Otto Jongerius
- Produced by: Matthijs van Heijningen
- Release date: 1976
- Running time: 95 minutes
- Country: Netherlands
- Language: Dutch

Alle dagen feest is a 1976 Dutch film directed by Ate de Jong and Otto Jongerius.
