= Aletta Jacobs: Het Hoogste Streven =

- Directed by: Nouchka van Brakel
- Starring: Eugenie Jansen; Nouchka van Brakel
- Cinematography: Nils Post
- Edited by: Michiel van Jaarsveld
- Music by: Boudewijn Tarenskeen
- Distributed by: Cinemien
- Release date: 1995
- Running time: 65 minutes
- Country: Netherlands
- Language: Dutch

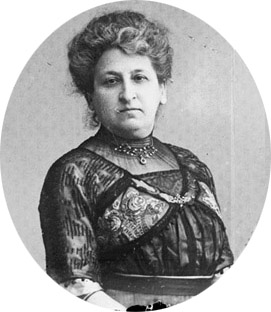

Aletta Jacobs: Het Hoogste Streven is a 1995 Dutch documentary film directed by Nouchka van Brakel.

The docudrama tells the story of a Dutch female student and doctor, a feminist at heart, campaigner for women's suffrage and birth control Aletta Jacobs, played by Luutgard Willems and Hans Kesting has the role of CV Gerritsen.

The film was the result of an initiative by Aletta Jacobs Foundation which was set up specifically for this purpose. The premiere was in Sappemeer, the birthplace of Aletta Jacobs.

Only 4110 visitors paid for the ticket.

== Cast ==
- Luutgard Willems as Aletta Jacobs
- Hans Kesting as C.V. Gerritsen
- Max Arian as Vader Jacobs
- Catherine ten Bruggencate as Moeder Jacobs
- Truus te Selle as Mademoiselle
- Edwin de Vries as Professor Rosenstein
- Sacha Bulthuis as Jeanette Broese van Groenou
- Anne Martien Lousberg as Meretrix
- Monic Hendrickx as Amsterdamse meretrix
- Hilt de Vos as Belgische feministe
- Krijn ter Braak as Hoogleraar
- Rijkent Vleeshouwer as Hoogleraar
- Albert van Ham as Hoogleraar
- Wigbolt Kruyver as Huwelijksbeambte
- Juul Vrijdag as Kiesvrouw
