= The Debut (1977 film) =

1977 Dutch drama film

Het Debuut
- Directed by: Nouchka van Brakel
- Written by: Nouchka van Brakel; Carel Donck
- Produced by: René Solleveld; Matthijs van Heijningen
- Starring: Marina de Graaf
- Cinematography: Theo van de Sande
- Edited by: August Verschueren
- Music by: Ron Westerbeek
- Release date: 18 May 1977
- Running time: 94 minutes
- Country: Netherlands
- Language: Dutch

Het Debuut ('The Debut') is a 1977 Dutch drama film based on a Hester Albach's novel and directed by Nouchka van Brakel.

== Plot summary ==
A 14-year-old girl and a 41-year-old friend of her father's fall in love, and soon their relationship grows into a sexual one as well. For some time all is happy, but then the tension grows too much, because of the secrecy and frustration of being the lover of a married man, and because she feels he starts to treat her too much like a child instead of a lover.

== Cast ==
- Marina de Graaf as Carolien
- Gerard Cox as Hugo
- Pleuni Touw as Rita/Hugo's wife
- Kitty Courbois as Anne/Carolien's mother
- Dolf de Vries as Dr. Peter/Carolien's father
- Wendy Ferwerda as Susan
- Sandrien van Brakel as Tanja/Carolien's schoolmate
- Pieter Fleury as Jacques

== Production ==
News of the film version began to pick up steam in November 1976 when De Telegraph ran a full-page article on the film's casting. Nouchka van Brakel wanted an unknown for the lead, though. It was essential that the part not be played by a recognizable actress. A week before Christmas, 1976, De Telegraph announced 17-year-old Marina de Graaf as the actress who Van Brakel had cast.

== Reception ==
"Het Debuut was one of the top three Dutch films of 1977." The film, "Nouchka's first full - length film, (is) a confident justification of her belief that a woman can render her sex much more precisely on screen than a male director can", according to Dutch Cinema: An Illustrated History.
