= Romeo (1990 film) =

- Directed by: Rita Horst
- Written by: Rita Horst
- Produced by: Frans Rasker
- Starring: Monique van de Ven
- Cinematography: Theo Bierkens
- Edited by: Ot Louw
- Music by: Boudewijn Tarenskeen
- Distributed by: Concorde Film
- Release date: 13 April 1990
- Running time: 94 minutes
- Country: Netherlands
- Language: Dutch

Romeo is a 1990 Dutch drama film directed by Rita Horst, starring Monique van de Ven and Johan Leysen. It was entered into the 17th Moscow International Film Festival.

== Cast ==
- Monique van de Ven as Anne Herden
- Johan Leysen as Matthijs
- Ottolien Boeschoten as Nel
- Peter Bolhuis as Chiel
- Hans Croiset as Dokter
- Peter De Wijn as Verhoeven, oude man
- Coby Timp as Moeder van Anne
- Bob van den Berg as Vader van Anne
- Pim Lambeau as Dame met hondje
- Mouna Goeman Borgesius as Verpleegster
- Theo de Groot as Co-assistant
- Nettie Blanken as Tweede dokter
- Judy Doorman as Kennis Matthijs
- Elja Pelgrom as Kennis Anne
- Arjan Kindermans as Frank
