= Joke Bruijs =

Dutch actress, singer and cabaret artist (1952–2025)

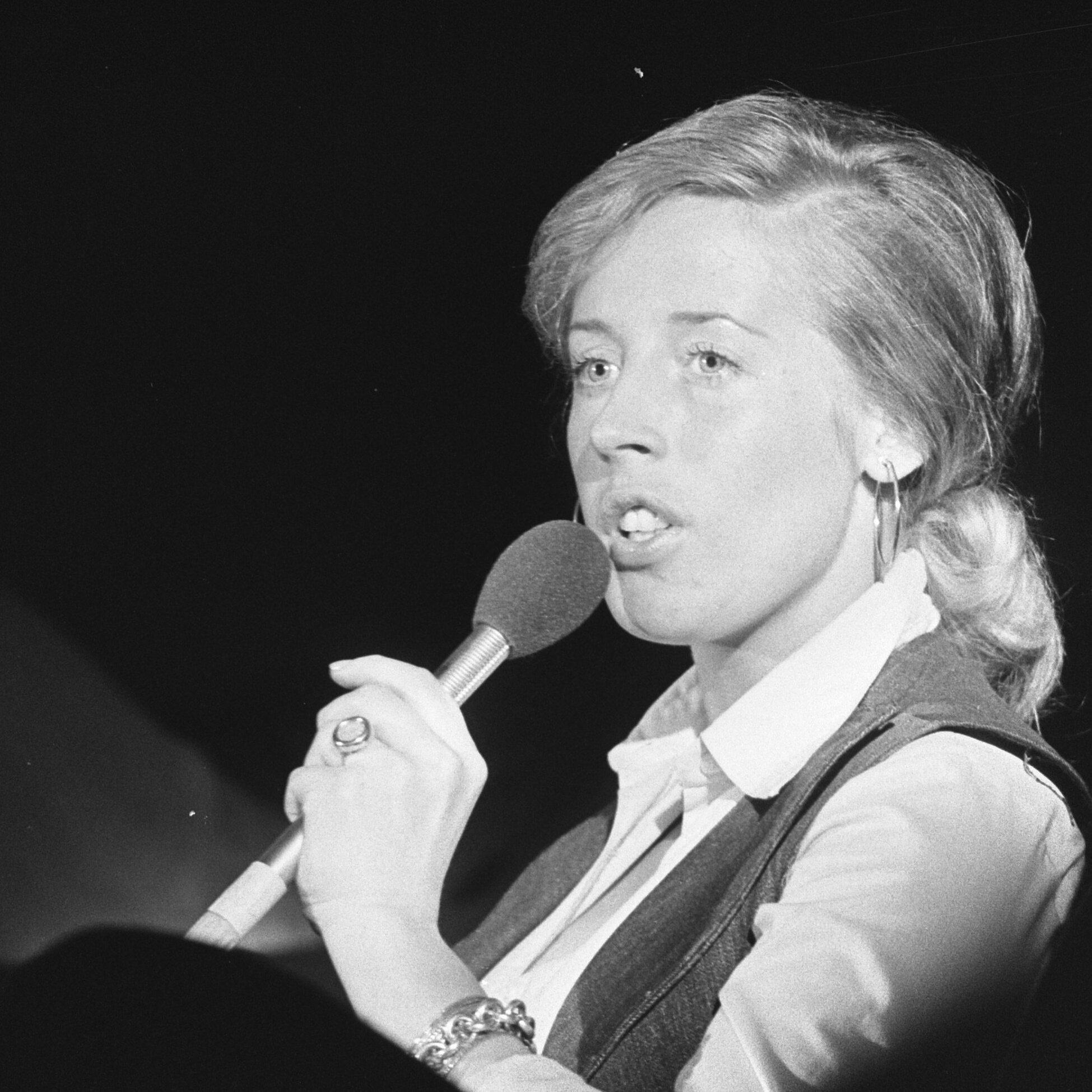
- Bruijs singing in 1975
- Born: 14 January 1952; Rotterdam, Netherlands
- Died: 16 September 2025 (aged 73); Wassenaar, Netherlands
- Occupations: Actress, singer, comedian
- Years active: 1966–2022
- Spouse(s): Gerard Cox, Boris Beyer
- Partner: Frits Landesbergen

Joke Bruijs (14 January 1952 – 16 September 2025) was a Dutch actress, singer and cabaret artist. She performed with big bands, recorded songs, and appeared in films and Dutch television. She was referred to as the "First Lady of Rotterdam".

== Background ==
Bruijs was born in Rotterdam on 14 January 1952, into a musical family.

== Career ==
In 1966, Bruijs joined a pop group, The Spitfires, who were based in Rotterdam. She performed in cabaret shows with Mini & Maxi and the Dutch comedian André van Duin.

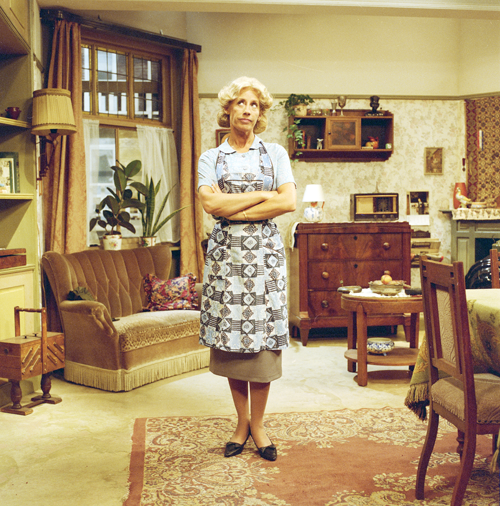
in Toen was geluk heel gewoon

In 1970, she competed in the National Song Contest, performing the song "Okido" and placing fourth.

She worked with singer and actor Gerard Cox, and they married. They performed as husband and wife in two Dutch sitcoms: Vreemde praktijken (1989–1993; Strange Practices), followed the next year with the long-running series Toen was geluk heel gewoon (1994–2009; When Happiness Was Very Common). They worked together later, after they were no longer married, in the feature film Casa Coco (2022).

In 2009, she began appearing in the long-running Dutch soap opera Goede tijden, slechte tijden. She returned to perform on the show in 2010 and 2011. On screen she plays the mother of characters Rik and Danny de Jong before her character left for Canada. Her character returned to the story in 2018.

She sang on tour with The Ramblers. The performed together in the 1960s on Dutch radio.

== Personal life and death ==
Bruijs was married to the singer Gerard Cox; they remained good friends.

Beginning about 2003 she was in a relationship with the musician Frits Landesbergen. They made an album together as his marriage was ending, and her marriage to Boris Beyer had ended. Landesbergen was younger by 11 years. They had a second home on the Dutch Caribbean island of Bonaire.

Bruijs died on 16 September 2025, at the age of 73. Her death occurred three days after the death of her former husband, Gerard Cox.

== Honours and awards ==
In 2003, Rotterdam presented her with an Erasmus Pin.

After fifty years as a performer, Bruijs was celebrated with a concert at De Doelen on 7 May 2017, that featured North Sea Symphonic Bigbad Orchestra.
