= Gerard Cox =

Dutch singer and actor (1940–2025)

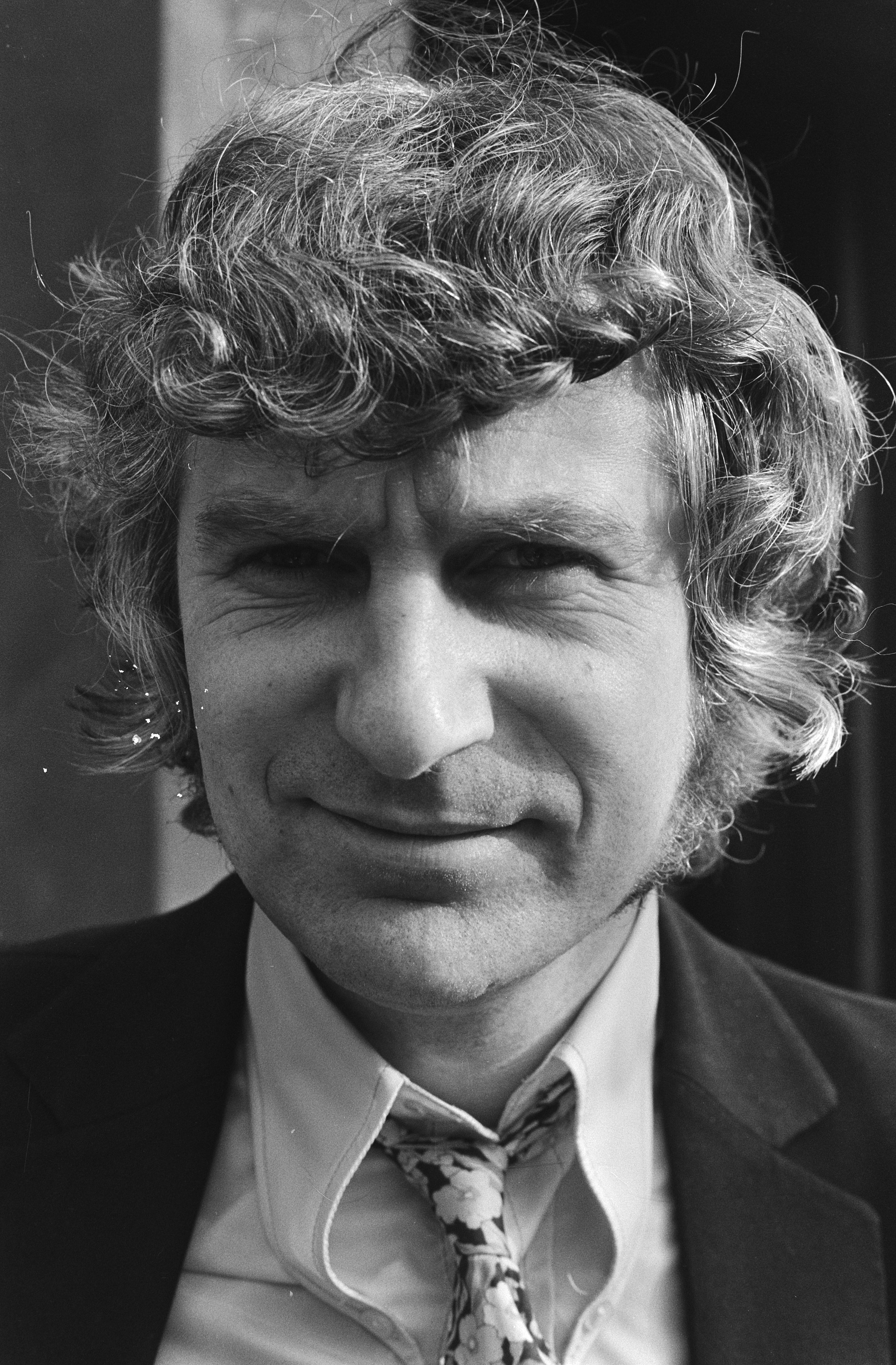
- Cox in 1971
- Born: Gerardus Antonius Cox; 6 March 1940; Rotterdam, Netherlands
- Died: 13 September 2025 (aged 85); Mijnsheerenland, Netherlands
- Citizenship: Dutch
- Occupations: Actor, singer
- Years active: 1961–2025
- Awards: Radio 5 Nostalgia Oeuvreprijs
- Website: http://www.gerardcox.nl (Archived - 19 July 2025)

Gerardus Antonius Cox (6 March 1940 – 13 September 2025) was a Dutch singer, cabaret artist, actor and director. For 15 years, he played the lead character of the Dutch sitcom Toen Was Geluk Heel Gewoon.

== Life and career ==
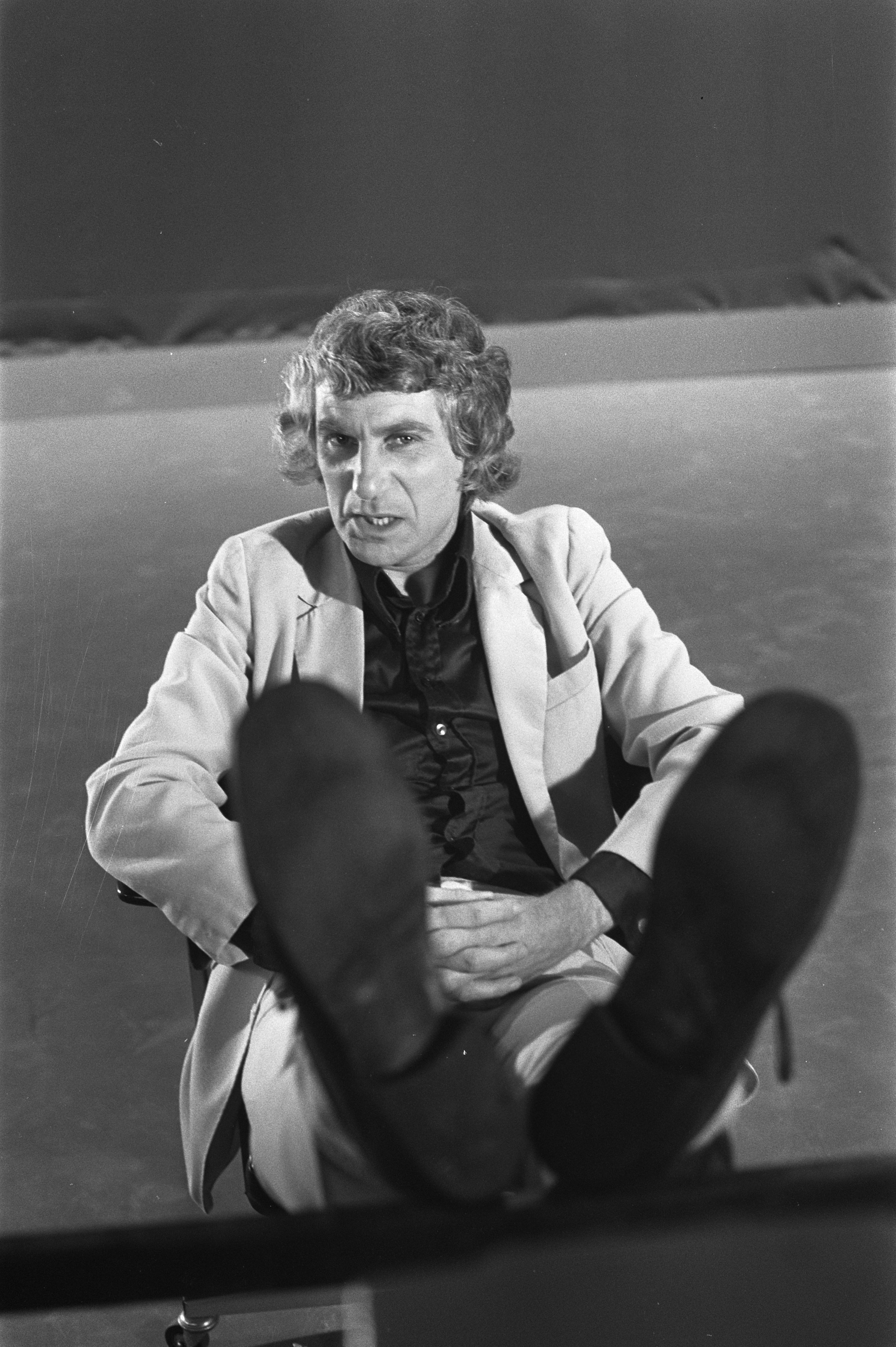
Cox in 1972

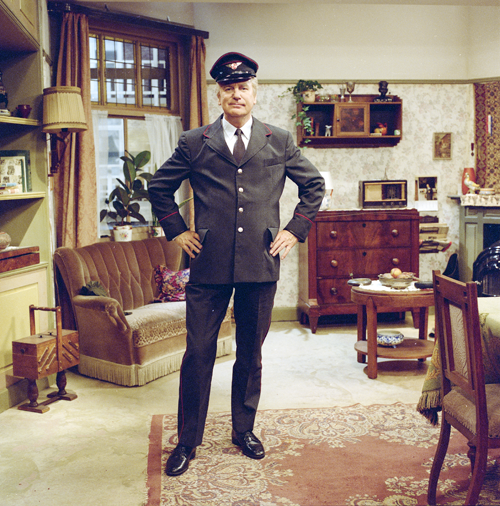
Cox on set of Toen Was Geluk Heel Gewoon in 1993

Cox was born on 6 March 1940. He made his acting debut in the 1977 film Het Debuut directed by Nouchka van Brakel.

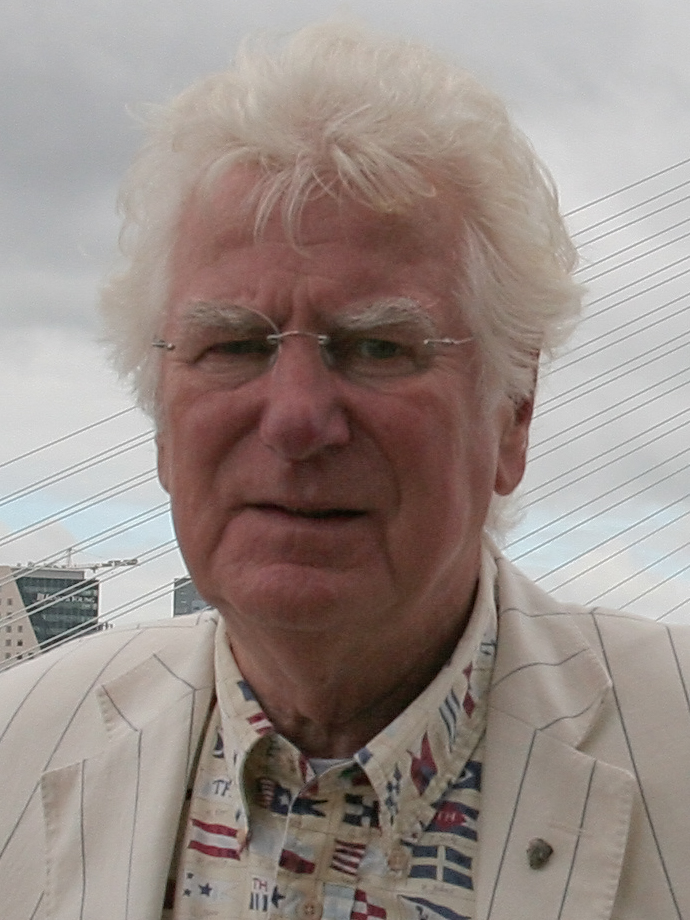
Cox in 2007

In 2018, Cox had a leading role in the RTL 4 alternative comedy series Beter Laat Dan Nooit, where he travels around the world with other Dutch celebrities, which include Peter Faber, Willibrord Frequin, and Barrie Stevens.

In 2020, he was involved with a film which also starred his former wife Joke Bruijs. They had ended their marriage in 1987, after realising that they were just good friends. In 2022, they starred in the film Casa Coco.

Cox announced in August 2025 he was diagnosed with metastasized oesophageal cancer and refused treatment. He died in Mijnsheerenland on 13 September 2025, at the age of 85. The death of Joke Bruijs was announced 16 September 2025.

== Discography ==
=== Albums ===
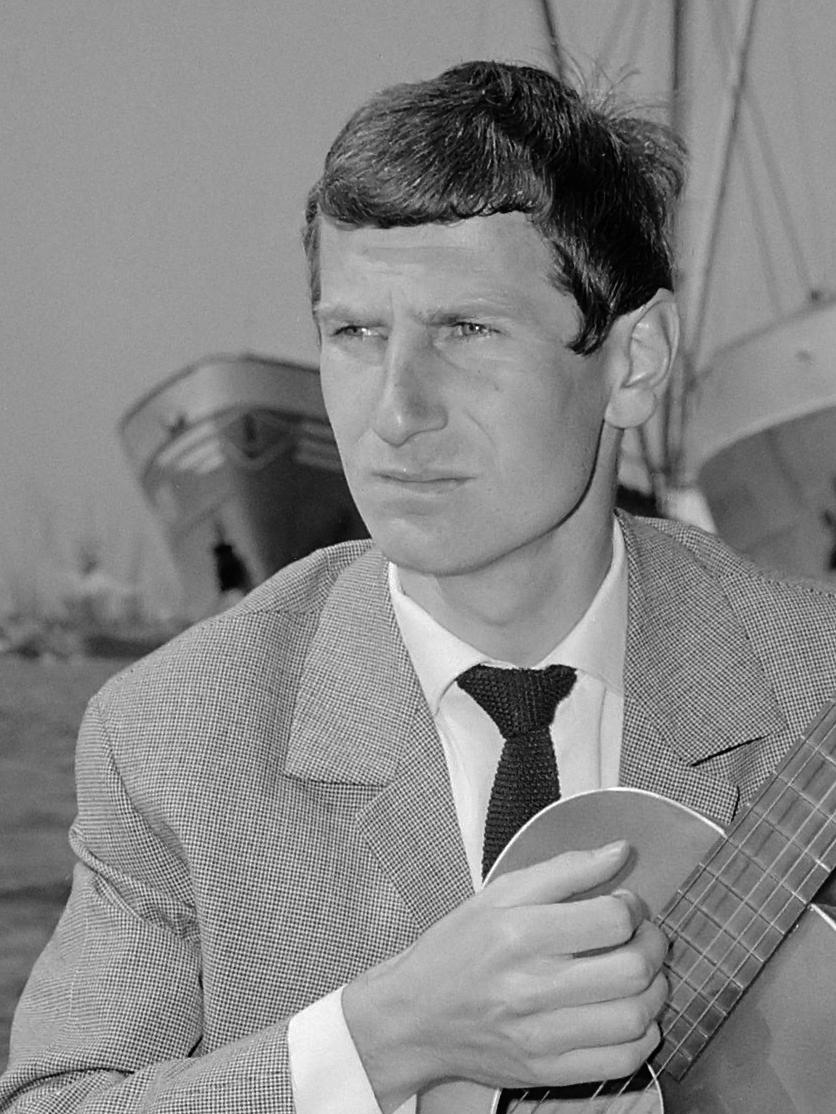
Cox in 1964

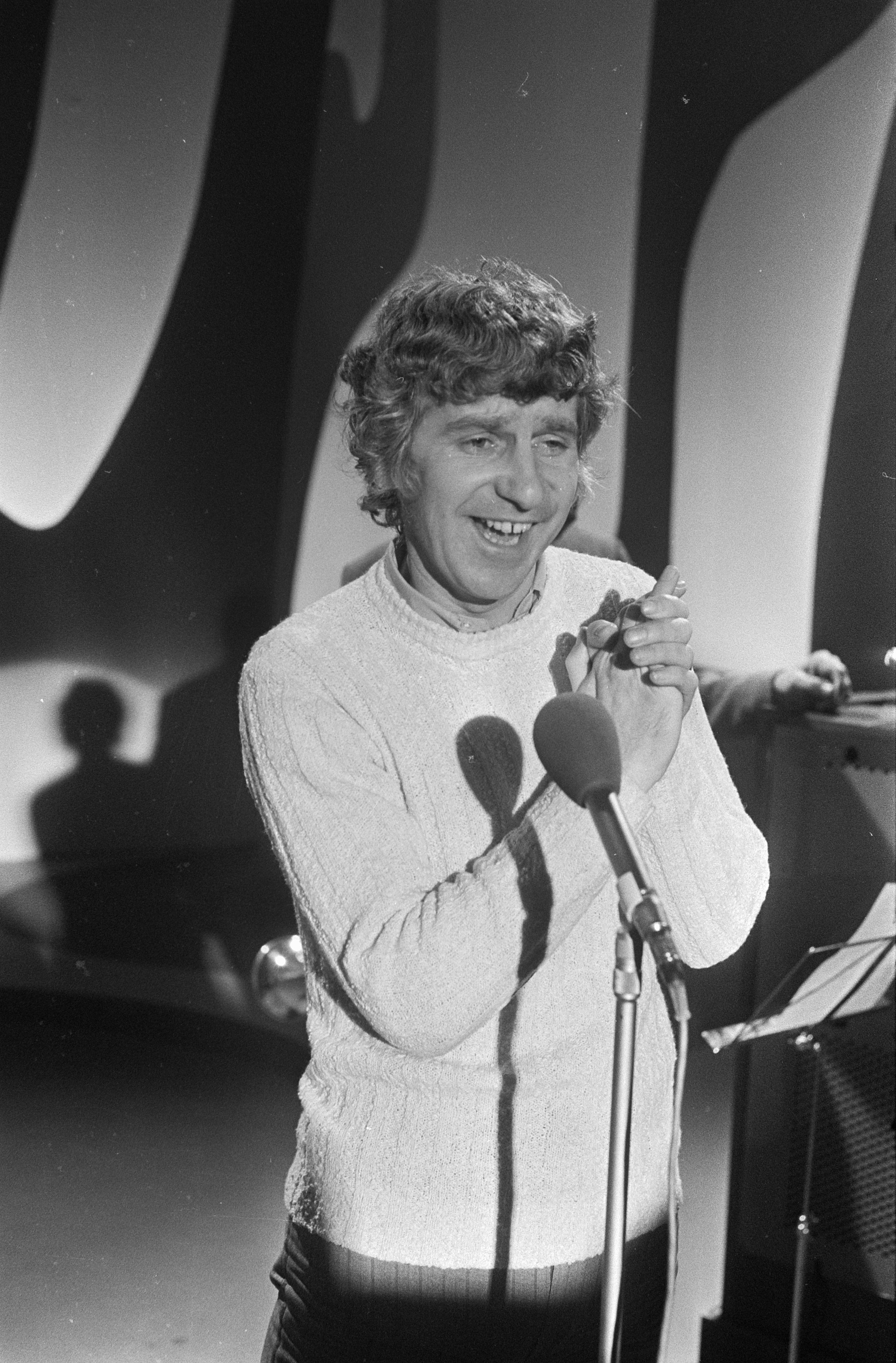
Cox performing in February 1971

- 1968 – Gerard Cox - 12"LP - CNR - SLPT 35055
- 1971 – Wie Wijst Gerard Cox De Weg... ? - 12"LP - DECCA - 6376 002
- 1972 – Vrijblijvend... , Gerard Cox - 12"LP - CBS - S 65235
- 1972 – De Grootste Successen Van Gerard Cox - 12"LP - CNR - 241 383
- 1973 – De Beste Van Gerard Cox - 12"LP - CBS - S 53029
- 1974 – Alles Van Gerard Cox - 12"LP - CBS - S 80462
- 1975 – 't Voordeel Van De Twijfel - 12"LP - CBS - S 65981
- 1976 – Je Moet Je Verdriet Verbijten - 12"LP - CBS - S 81629
- 1978 – Zo Zijn We Niet Getrouwd - 12"LP - ARIOLA - 25 889 XOT
- 1978 – Ik Hoop Dat 't Nooit Ochtend Wordt... - 12"LP - ARIOLA - 200 241
- 1982 – Lucky Luke (stem acteur)
- 1987 – Aangenaam - CD - EMI - 746 723 2
- 1988 – 't Is Weer Voorbij Die Mooie Zomer - CD - CBS - 462 647 2
- 1988 – Balans - CD - EMI - 791 201 2
- 1993 – Leuk Voor Later - CD - EMI - 789 018 2
- 1995 – Uit Liefde En Respect... Voor Zoveel Moois - CD - EMI - 832 481 2
- 1998 – Het Beste Van Gerard Cox - CD - SONY MUSIC MEDIA - 493 145 2
- 1998 – Andere Noten - 1 CD + 1 CDS - ABCD - ABCD 30148 2
- 2001 – Wat Je Zingt, Dat Ben Je Zelf... (met Erik van der Wurff) - CD - NIKKELEN NELIS - NN 500 203 2
- 2001 – Dubbelgoud (Die Goeie Ouwe Tijd + De Laaielichter) - 2 CD's - DISKY - HHR 649 412
- 2003 – Gerard Cox - CD - CNR MUSIC - 22 208032

=== Singles ===
- 1961 – Spinnetje ~ Schutting ~ Ganzenhoedster / Als Ik Zeg... ~ Watervlinder ~ Mignonne - 7"EP - HIS MASTER'S VOICE - 7 EPH 2010
- 1962 – Jacqueline / De Mensenbel - 7"single - HIS MASTER'S VOICE - 45 SGI 105
- 1963 – Wonderen / Stille Nacht ~ Ave Maria (met Anneke Visser) - 7"FD - FONOPOST - SHOL 299
- 1965 – Rompelmoes: Langharig ~ 't Hoeft Allemaal Niet Zo Erg / Dodemansplaats ~ Rompelmoes (met Jan Willem ten Broeke) - 7"EP - CNR - HX 1335
- 1966 – De Pil / En Steeds Weer (met Jan Willem ten Broeke) - 7"single - OMEGA - 35 485
- 1966 – De Meisjes Van De Suikerwerkfabriek / Het duiveltje Van Hof (met Jan Willem ten Broeke) - 7"single - CNR - UH 9875
- 1967 – God Is Niet Dood / La Belle Américaine - 7"single - CNR - UH 9927
- 1969 – Een Broekje In De Branding / De Liedertjes - 7"single - PHILIPS - JF 336 066
- 1970 – Feyenoord - Feyenoord - Feyenoord - Feyenoord - Feyenoord / Ajax Is Dood...! - 7"single - PHILIPS - 6012 056
- 1971 – Niet In De Auto / De Baardmijt - 7"single - DECCA - 6100 031
- 1971 – Wie Wijst Mij De Weg In Hilversum / Meisjes - 7"single - DECCA - 6100 051
- 1971 – Dat Is Geen Liefde Meer... / Tante Kee Van De B.B... .!! - 7"single - CBS - 7697
- 1972 – 1948 (Toen Was Geluk Heel Gewoon) (Alone Again (Naturally) ) / Wat Jammer Toch Dat Alles Altijd Overgaat - 7"single - CBS - 8452
- 1973 – 't Is Weer Voorbij, Die Mooie Zomer (City Of New Orleans) / Zullen We Ritselen? - 7"single - CBS - 1784 (#1 on the Dutch Top 40 for 5 weeks, based on "City Of New Orleans")
- 1973 – Morgen Wordt Het Beter (New World In The Morning) / Onze Linda (Permissive Twit) - 7"single - CBS - 1341
- 1974 – Die Goeie Ouwe Tijd (Darauf Ein Glas) (A La Santé D'hier) / Echt Waar... (What Could Be Nicer) - 7"single - CBS - 2354
- 1975 – Een Mooi Verhaal (Une Belle Histoire) / Wie Wil? (We Will) - 7"single - CBS - 3827
- 1976 – Je Moet Je Verdriet Verbijten (Ça Va Pas Changer Le Monde) / Fantasieën Van Een Vader (Les Mesonges D'un Pere A Son Fils) - 7"single - CBS - 4549
- 1977 – Leip Doen Op Het Leipenbal (Freakin' At The Freakers Ball) / De Grote Schoonmaak - 7"single - CBS - 4999
- 1978 – Chrisje / Zo'n Regel - 7"single - ARIOLA - 15 504 AT
- 1978 – Pijn Is 'n Souvenir / Later - 7"single - ARIOLA - 15 742 AT
- 1978 – Ik Hoop Dat 't Nooit Ochtend Wordt... / Weinig Tot Niets - 7"single - ARIOLA - 100 064
- 1979 – Ik Sta Zo Weer Klaar Met M'n Bagage (Que Sont Devenues Mes Amours?) / Kinderen! - 7"single - ARIOLA - 101 064
- 1986 – Neem De Metro, Mama! / Ben Je In Rotterdam Geboren - 7"single - START - 083/048
- 1986 – Die Laaielichter (Snowbird) / Toch Hou Ik Van Je, Rotterdam - 7"single - EMI - 1C 006 127392 7
- 1987 – Effe Eentje Tussendoor / De Hoekse Waard - 7"single - EMI - 1C 006 127415 7
- 1987 – Zo'n Lekkere Strakke Blonde Meid Op 'n Racefiets / Hoe Lang Nog, Liefje? - 7"single - EMI - 1C 006 127429 7
- 1988 – 'n Lekker Hollands Liedje / Liedje Van De Liefde - 7"single - EMI - 1C 006 127464 7
- 1988 – Bram Vingerling / Als Ik Later Doodga - 7"single - EMI - 1C 006 127500 7
- 1989 – Op 'n Hoge Zwarte Fiets / Jij Kan Ongelofelijk Liegen - 7"single - EMI - 1C 006 127481 7
- 1990 – Fijn D'r Vandoor In M'n Automobiel / Verkeer(d) - 7"single - EMI - 1C 006 127527 7
- 1993 – Met Z'n Tweeën (met Robert Long) ~ Want Het Is Niet Goed - CDS - EMI - 872 018 2
- 1995 – Greetje Met De Mandolien (Live) ~ Relativeren - CDS - EMI - 720 692 2
- 1998 – Nooit Meer Verkering ~ Ik Wil Van Je Af - CDS - ABCD - ABCD 30176 3
- 1999 – Ik Wil Vanavond Met Je Vrijen ~ Luduvudu - CDS - ABCD - ABCD 30188 3
- 2000 – Toen Kwam Jij ~ Kermis - CDS - ABCD - ABCD 30277 3
