= Doctor Vlimmen =

- Directed by: Guido Pieters
- Based on: Dr. Vlimmen (novel) by Anton Roothaert
- Produced by: Gerrit Visscher; Jef Vliegen
- Starring: Peter Faber; Chris Lomme; Roger Van Hool; Cox Habbema; Monique van de Ven
- Music by: Pim Koopman
- Distributed by: Concorde Film
- Release date: 23 February 1977
- Running time: 107 minutes
- Country: Netherlands
- Language: Dutch

Doctor Vlimmen is a 1977 Dutch co-production film, directed by Guido Pieters, starring Peter Faber.
