= Van de koele meren des doods (film) =

1982 film

- DVD cover
- Directed by: Nouchka van Brakel
- Screenplay by: Ton Vorstenbosch; Nouchka van Brakel
- Story by: Frederik van Eeden (novel)
- Produced by: Matthijs van Heijningen
- Starring: Renée Soutendijk; Derek de Lint
- Cinematography: Theo van de Sande
- Edited by: Edgar Burcksen
- Music by: Erik van der Wurff; Erik van 't Wout
- Distributed by: Tuschinski Film Distribution
- Release date: 30 September 1982
- Running time: 120 minutes
- Country: Netherlands
- Languages: Dutch; English; French

Van de koele meren des doods is a 1982 Dutch film, directed by Nouchka van Brakel and based on the same-named novel by Frederik van Eeden. Book and film give an account of a bourgeois woman who struggles with her sexuality. The film is known internationally as Hedwig: The Quiet Lakes and The Cool Lakes of Death. The film was selected as the Dutch entry for the Best Foreign Language Film at the 55th Academy Awards, but was not accepted as a nominee.

== Plot ==
In 1869, Hedwig, a young woman from a wealthy, upper-middle-class Dutch family, struggles to cope with the tragic loss of her mother to typhoid fever. She finds solace only in Alice in Wonderland, the last book her mother ever read to her. While mourning at the cemetery, she meets Johan, a passionate young man who immediately falls for her. Caught in the throes of awakening desire, Hedwig's subsequent sexual fantasies are discovered by her strictly religious family. Shamed by her governess—who inflicts severe psychological trauma by claiming Hedwig's "sins" have rendered her barren—a humiliated Hedwig attempts suicide, but survives.

Three years later, Hedwig crosses paths with Johan again. Now a penniless, aspiring artist, he proposes to her. Fearing she will only bring him misery, Hedwig rejects him and instead enters a socially advantageous marriage with Gerard, a notary. However, the union is entirely devoid of passion, as Gerard is sexually quite repressive (always emphasizing "chastity") even though he treats Hedwig well material-wise.

The emotional isolation takes a physical toll on Hedwig, whose health begins to deteriorate. On a doctor's advice, Gerard attempts to consummate the marriage, but the encounter leaves both of them traumatized. Suffocated by the predictability of her life, she confides her profound unhappiness to her friend, Leonora.

Hedwig's life spirals further when she receives a volatile letter from a bitter Johan, who cruelly accuses her of selling herself out. Terrified, she rushes to find him, only to discover his corpse; he has committed suicide by gunshot. Driven to despair, Hedwig attempts to shoot herself as well, but Gerard intervenes just in time.

Seeking an escape from her grief, Hedwig crosses paths with Ritsaart, a romantic pianist. Though she initially resists his advances, she can no longer suppress her repressed desires and begins a passionate affair with him. Experiencing sexual fulfillment for the first time, Hedwig resolves to leave her husband. Enraged by jealousy, Gerard plots to murder Ritsaart during a confrontation at the house. However, their feud is cut short when they notice water leaking through the ceiling. Upstairs, they discover Hedwig in a bathtub, having slashed her wrists. Realizing that Ritsaart is the only one who can truly save her, a defeated Gerard grants his wife her freedom.

Hedwig and Ritsaart flee to England, posing as husband and wife. While initially embraced by high society, they are swiftly ostracized once Hedwig's status as a mistress is exposed. The couple retreats to the secluded countryside of Cobham, Kent, to await the birth of their child.

Just as Hedwig goes into labor, Ritsaart is called away for a rare musical engagement. Following a grueling delivery, Hedwig gives birth to a daughter, Charlotte, whom the local physician secretly dooms to die within days. Suffering from severe postpartum psychosis, a delusional Hedwig packs her jewelry and her newborn baby into a bag and flees for the Netherlands.

At the port of Calais, Hedwig mistakes a predatory stranger for Gerard. The man exploits her delusion, robbing her of her money and fine clothes, though she fiercely protects the bag. He strands her on a train to Paris, successfully stealing the bag as the train pulls away. Completely unhinged, Hedwig ends up confined to an isolation cell in a Parisian psychiatric ward. Upon her release, she spirals into morphine addiction and turns to prostitution to survive.

After collapsing from starvation on the Parisian streets, Hedwig is hospitalized and placed under the care of Sister Paula, a compassionate French nun who helps her conquer her addiction. Nursed back to physical and spiritual health, Hedwig finally returns to her homeland.

She visits her old friend Joop, who is impressed by her resilience and personal growth. There, she has a final, bittersweet encounter with Ritsaart; she confesses her eternal love for him but requests that they never see each other again. Having finally found an inner peace that eluded her for decades, Hedwig chooses to live out her remaining years in quiet anonymity, embraced by the simplicity of a humble farming family.

== Production ==
The film was produced by Matthijs van Heijningen, with whom van Brakel had worked previously, most notably on Zwaarmoedige verhalen voor bij de centrale verwarming (1975). The budget was small—some €1.28 million in today's currency—which led to conflict between Van Brakel and Van Heijningen. The former was concerned with artistic integrity, the latter with money; Van Heijningen publicly criticized the director and her staff by calling them lazy amateurs in a leading Dutch movie magazine. This led to a work stoppage. Van Heijningen apologized, again publicly, and work was resumed; afterward, he took out a full-page ad and congratulated the crew—they did likewise.

Several scenes in the film were shot at the Hof van Moerkerken in Mijnsheerenland where Frederik van Eeden lived in the 19th century.

== Cast ==
- Renée Soutendijk as Hedwig Marga 'Hetty' de Fontayne
- Derek de Lint as Ritsaart (Richard Delmonte)
- Adriaan Olree as Gerard Johannes Hendrikus Wijbrands
- Erik van 't Wout as Johan
- Peter Faber as Joop
- Claire Wauthion as Sister Paula / Mother
- Krijn ter Braak as Father
- Lettie Oosthoek as Governess
- Kristine de Both as Leonora
- Huub Stapel as Herman
- Siem Vroom as Religion teacher
- Rudolf Lucieer as General practitioner

Note: Dutch actor Hans van Tongeren was initially cast as Johan, the character who commits suicide—but he committed suicide just before the filming started.

== Reception ==
The film is praised as a "handsome period melodrama". Critical reviews were positive, and with 602,637 admissions it was the best-attended Dutch movie of 1982. The Dutch broadcaster VARA listed the film at #10 in a list of the best Dutch films of the twentieth century, and the movie site NeerlandsFilmdoek.nl listed it as #56 out of 258.

== See also ==
- List of submissions to the 55th Academy Awards for Best Foreign Language Film
- List of Dutch submissions for the Academy Award for Best Foreign Language Film
