= Nouchka van Brakel =

Dutch film director

- Born: April 18, 1940 (age 85)

Nouchka van Brakel (born 18 April 1940 in Amsterdam) is a Dutch film director known for her 1982 movie Van de koele meren des doods. That movie, and A Woman Like Eve (1979), established her as an important Dutch feminist film director. Van Brakel said that her ambition is to make movies about women who want to change their lives and their societies.

== Career ==
Nouchka van Brakel was born in a socialist family which lived a fairly bohemian lifestyle: her mother was a singer and her father was a jazz musician, and they lived in Turkey for two years. She went to high school in Bilthoven, living with her mother while her father was abroad. After studying drama in Utrecht, she became the first woman to attend the Netherlands Film and Television Academy, which at the time was housed at Oude Hoogstraat 24, around the corner from her house in Amsterdam's Nieuwmarkt district. She was the only student who owned a house, which quickly became a meeting place for student meetings as well as for Dolle Mina, a feminist organization founded in 1970. In that time period she began making short political films using 16 mm film; van Brakel credits this period with giving her the desire to make movies featuring strong female characters. Her graduating class included very successful future directors and cameramen, including Adriaan Ditvoorst, Wim Verstappen, Robby Müller, and Jan de Bont.

Van Brakel's second movie, Zwaarmoedige verhalen voor bij de centrale verwarming (1975), was produced by Matthijs van Heijningen, who was responsible for launching the careers of a number of notable Dutch directors, including van Brakel. Her fourth movie, Een Vrouw als Eva (A Woman Like Eve, 1979), starring Monique van de Ven and Maria Schneider as lesbian lovers, was a commercial success in the Netherlands, but the sexually explicit story of two women who fall in love at a feminist conference was not picked up in the United States, despite an enthusiastic endorsement by Shirley MacLaine. Van de koele meren des doods, another van Heijningen production (he produced a great number of adaptations of literary works) was a success, and established her reputation. After 1987's Een maand later, her career seemed to falter.

Her 1995 movie on Aletta Jacobs, Aletta Jacobs: Het Hoogste Streven, features the filmmaker herself as interviewing Jacobs's contemporaries. The movie was criticized for "imposing a Jewish atmosphere on the [Jacobs] family, for which there is no actual evidence." Her 2001 film De Vriendschap, with a set of elderly main characters, focused on male friendship and female sexuality, but the film was a critical and commercial failure, which strongly affected her. She considered leaving the industry altogether, but returned in 2006 with a documentary on Mary; years before she had gotten fascinated with Mary, who in her estimation seemed unhappy in many depictions of the annunciation. She began collecting reproductions of paintings, many of which are shown in the 2006 documentary Ave Maria; Mary, she says, was an independent and educated woman who is politically important as well. In 2018, she published her first book, Scenes uit mijn eigen draaiboek (Scenes from my personal screenplay) which was awarded with the Louis Hartlooper Prize for the best film publication.

== Feminism ==
That's what I see all around me: women, after a setback, always try to pick up the pieces again. They have an eternal creativity. If war comes, they tuck their child under their arm and walk to the next refuge. They keep on going. Women have unbelievable strength and stubbornness and joy of life. If they ever quit doing what they do, the place would be a mess. Men wage war and cheer and hold meetings. All those suits, if you open up the newspaper, nothing but men in suits.

— Nouchka van Brakel, 1995 interview with Vrij Nederland.

Van Brakel's first four major movies (from Het Debuut to Een maand later) all centered on women and their clashes with the outside world. She is listed among a number of European women filmmakers who benefited from the feminist wave of the 1960s and 1970s and entered a previously male-dominated domain, including Mai Zetterling and Chantal Akerman; Een vrouw als Eva (1979) is mentioned as one of the female-directed movies that offer "very affirmative images of lesbianism". A recurring theme in her films is that of "women who break out of society's conventions and want something 'controversial'". Her documentary work includes "various topics of feminist interest, such as children's education and the training of midwives", a study of the Virgin Mary, and the physical and social effects of aging.

== Filmography ==
- Ave Maria. Van Dienstmaagd des Heren tot Koningin van de Hemel (documentary, 2006, co-produced with the KRO)
- De Vriendschap (2001)
- Aletta Jacobs: Het Hoogste Streven (1995)
- Een maand later (1987)
- Van de koele meren des doods (1982)
- Een vrouw als Eva (A Woman Like Eve, 1979)
- The Debut (1977)
- Zwaarmoedige verhalen voor bij de centrale verwarming (1975)
- Ouder Worden (Aging, 1975)
- Sabotage (1966 short film)
