= Camping (1978 film) =

- Directed by: Nolan Dow
- Written by: Nolan Dow
- Produced by: Nolan Dow
- Starring: Joop Admiraal; Yolande Bertsch
- Release date: 1978
- Running time: 91 minutes
- Country: Netherlands
- Language: Dutch

Camping is a 1978 Dutch film directed by Nolan Dow.

== Cast ==
- Joop Admiraal - Henk
- Yolande Bertsch - Jessica Bannink
- Cas Enklaar - Klaas
- Peter Faber - Guus
- Frank Groothof - Vriend van Reina
- Judith Hees -
- Marja Kok - Rita
