= Mady Saks =

Dutch film director and documentary filmmaker

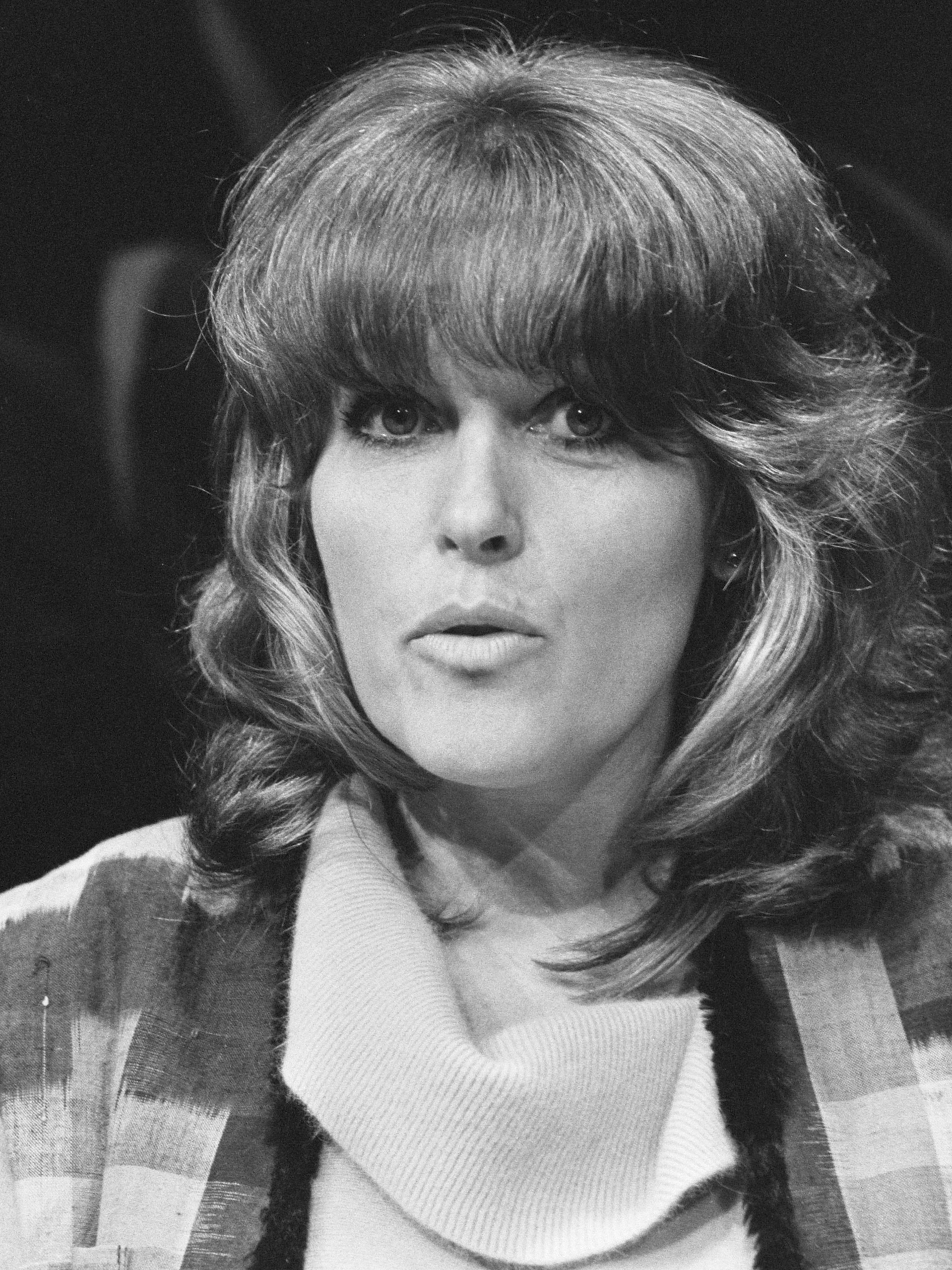
- Mady Saks in 1983
- Born: Mady Jacoba Saks; 28 November 1941; Amsterdam, Netherlands
- Died: 29 August 2006 (aged 64); Amsterdam, Netherlands
- Occupations: Film director, documentary filmmaker
- Years active: c. 1965–2003
- Spouses: Roeland Kerbosch (m. 1963; div. 1987); Jean-Claude Biard (m. 1989)

Mady Saks (born Mady Jacoba Saks; 28 November 1941 – 29 August 2006) was a Dutch film director and documentary filmmaker.

== Early life ==
Saks was born in Amsterdam as the daughter of Emanuel (Eduard) Saks, a Jewish impresario, and Jantina de Ouden. She became familiar with the performing arts at an early age through her father’s work as an agent for theatre performers and circus acts. After attending secondary school she began studying Spanish at the University of Amsterdam around 1960. In 1963, Saks married film producer Roeland Kerbosch. Two years later she discontinued her studies to work as his assistant on a documentary project in Africa, where she learned filmmaking in practice.

== Career ==
Between 1965 and 1975, Saks worked as a sound technician, assistant director, and interviewer on socially engaged documentaries about developing countries, particularly in Africa. In the late 1970s, she gained prominence with her own documentary productions that addressed feminist themes. These included Verkrachting (1975), a documentary on sexual violence within marriage, which won an award at the Miami International Film Festival.

In 1982, Saks made her feature film debut with Ademloos, a film about postnatal depression starring Monique van de Ven. Her second feature film, Iris (1987), again starring Van de Ven, won awards in Moscow, Seattle, and Montreal and was later adapted into a television series. Her final feature film, De Gulle Minnaar (1990), received poor reviews, after which she focused primarily on documentary work for television.

== Later life and death ==
In her later years, Saks worked intermittently on documentaries, including 26.000 gezichten, a project about rejected asylum seekers. After a prolonged illness, she died in Amsterdam on 29 August 2006 at the age of 64 and was buried at cemetery Zorgvlied. Part of her estate was used to establish the Mady Saks Fund, which provides financial support to filmmakers developing cultural documentaries.
