= Ciske de Rat =

1942 book by Piet Bakker

Ciske the Rat
- First English-language edition
- Author: Piet Bakker
- Original title: Ciske de Rat
- Translator: Celina Wieniewska and Peter Janson-Smith
- Language: Dutch
- Publisher: Elsevier
- Publication date: 1942
- Publication place: Netherlands
- English publication date: 1958 (Doubleday)
- Media type: Print (Paperback)
- Pages: 620

Ciske de Rat ("Ciske the Rat") is the first part of a trilogy by Dutch author Piet Bakker. It is part of the Ciske trilogy which was written between 1941 (publication was however delayed by paper shortages until 1942) and 1946. The book was published in more than ten countries. It was made into two films, a television series and a musical. Best known is the film version of 1984, starring Danny de Munk as Ciske, Herman van Veen, and Willeke van Ammelrooy.

== Plot summary ==
The setting is in Amsterdam in the 1930s. The story is told by Ciske’s new teacher Bruis.

Ciske de Rat ("Ciske the Rat") is the story of eleven-year-old lonely street child Ciske (Franciscus) Vrijmoeth, who has no friends and is only called "the Rat". Ciske has to change school, because he poured ink over his teacher's head. After school, he helps out in a pub, where his mother Marie also works. His beloved father Cor is a sailor and therefore not at home. At school, he makes friends with a gifted, but sick boy called Dorus and Betje, a girl with abnormally low grades but a loving character, but also meets the unbearable bully Jantje. One night, Ciske finds his mother with another man, who beats him. As his mother tears out pages from a book which was borrowed from Dorus, Ciske gets angry and kills his mother with a knife. He is then arrested and sent to a reform school for half a year.

Ciske groeit op ("Ciske grows up") is the second part of the trilogy, in which we follow Ciske's imprisonment on the reform school. Once an outgoing, lively boy, he is now a seemingly abnormally calm and thoughtful young fellow, which disturbs Bruis. After being released, his life is rougher, since everyone, even his former friends but except Betje, his father and his stepmother Jans, treats him differently. Besides, Ciske's Jantje bullies him even worse and Ciske even gets to confront Jantje's mother. The case escalates when Jantje tackles Ciske as he tries to jump over the malt barges at the brewery, causing him to get stuck in the water and being severely injured. Luckily, Ciske heals quite quick and makes amends with his former friends.

In the third part, Cis de man ("Cis the man"), Ciske is now an adult soldier and fights against the German soldiers in May 1940, when the Germans invaded the Netherlands. His former teacher Bruis, who tells this story as well, happens to be his sergeant. Cis actually has more authority than Bruis, even having a lower position. He meets his nemesis Jan as well, who still hates him nowadays. In the end, Cis tries to save two soldiers who are left behind, but during his attempt to save them, he gets nearly fatally injured. However, he is able to cure and marries his girlfriend Betje.

This part of the book was published in 1946 after the Dutch liberation and is not included in the films.

== Films ==
=== 1955 ===
The first film was issued in 1955, starring Dick Van der Velde as Ciske and Kees Brusse as the teacher Bruis. The black-and-white film, which was directed by Wolfgang Staudte, won an OCIC Award and a Silver Lion at the Venice Film Festival. Based on admissions, it is still the third most popular Dutch film in Dutch box office history.

=== 1984 ===
The second film was directed by Guido Pieters and filmed by Frans Bromet. Ciske is played by Danny de Munk who also sang the title song Ik voel me zo verdomd alleen ("I feel so damned alone") which scored a number one hit in the Netherlands.

An enhanced television series was later broadcast.

Both films are still in the Top fifteen most-successful films in The Netherlands since 1945.

== Soundtrack ==
The 1984 soundtrack features two songs from the film: Ik voel me zo verdomd alleen (composed by Herman van Veen, lyrics by Karin Loomans) and Vergeet nu maar je zorgen ("Now forget your worries"), which is played at the closing credits.

== Musical ==
From October 5, 2007 to November 29, 2009, a musical based on the full trilogy toured the Netherlands and Belgium, starring 37-year-old Danny de Munk (who had gone on to appear in several Dutch musicals in the years after his portrayal of young Ciske in the movie) as grown-up Ciske. The musical was based on the 1984 film but added part of the storyline of the third book, switching back and forth between flashbacks to the events occurring in the 1930s and the days before the German invasion of the Netherlands in 1940. The show featured music by Henny Vrienten and lyrics by André Breedland. Paul Eenens directed the production. Queen Beatrix of the Netherlands was present at the gala premiere at the Royal Theater Carré in Amsterdam. The show received very positive reviews and seven Dutch musical awards (in 2008 the most awards ever bestowed on a single production). A CD and DVD were released of this stage production.

The musical was staged again in 2016/2017, in a slightly modified version, once more directed by Paul Eenens and starring Danny de Munk. It won, among others, the 2017 Dutch Musical Award for Best Dutch Musical.
