= Toen Was Geluk Heel Gewoon =

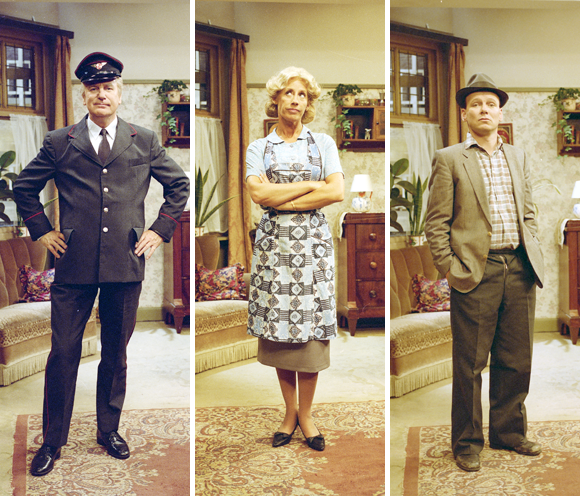
- The main cast members
- Genre: Sitcom
- Created by: Frank Janssen
- Based on: The Honeymooners by Jackie Gleason
- Written by: Gerard Cox; Sjoerd Pleijsier
- Directed by: Zdeněk Kraus; Frans Boelen (2 episodes)
- Starring: Gerard Cox; Joke Bruijs; Sjoerd Pleijsier; Mouna Goeman Borgesius
- Country of origin: Netherlands
- Original language: Dutch
- No. of seasons: 16
- No. of episodes: 227

Production
- Running time: 22 minutes
- Production companies: Katholieke Radio Omroep; John de Mol Produkties (seasons 1–3)

Original release
- Network: Nederland 1; Nederland 2
- Release: 2 January 1994 – 3 June 2009

Toen was geluk heel gewoon (When Happiness Was Very Common) was a popular Dutch television sitcom. It was broadcast on KRO from January 2, 1994, through June 3, 2009. The series, a Dutch adaptation of the American sitcom The Honeymooners, stars Gerard Cox and Sjoerd Pleijsier as friends and neighbors. Cox and his real-life spouse Joke Bruijs play spouses on the show. The show is the longest-running sitcom in the Netherlands.

The show's title is taken from a song, "1948 (Toen was geluk heel gewoon)" by Kees van Kooten and Wim de Bie (Van Kooten en De Bie), a Dutch adaptation of Gilbert O'Sullivan's "Alone Again (Naturally)" later covered by Cox.

== Cast ==
- Gerard Cox as Jaap Kooiman, a bus driver
- Joke Bruijs as Nel Kooiman, Jaap's wife
- Sjoerd Pleijsier as Simon "Siem" Stokvis, a journalist
- Mouna Goeman Borgesius as Zus Stokvis-Mollema, Siem's wife
- Koos van der Knaap as Karel van Dam
- Huib Rooymans as Mijnheer Harmsen, Jaap's boss
- Paul van Soest
- Elisabeth Versluys
- Ton van der Velden
- Walter Crommelin

== Running gags ==
- Jaap easily takes offence to Simon's remarks; he responds by wagging his finger back and forth towards the door, indicating Simon should leave, as Jaap raises his voice.
