= Marjan Berk =

Dutch writer, actress and singer (1932–2026)

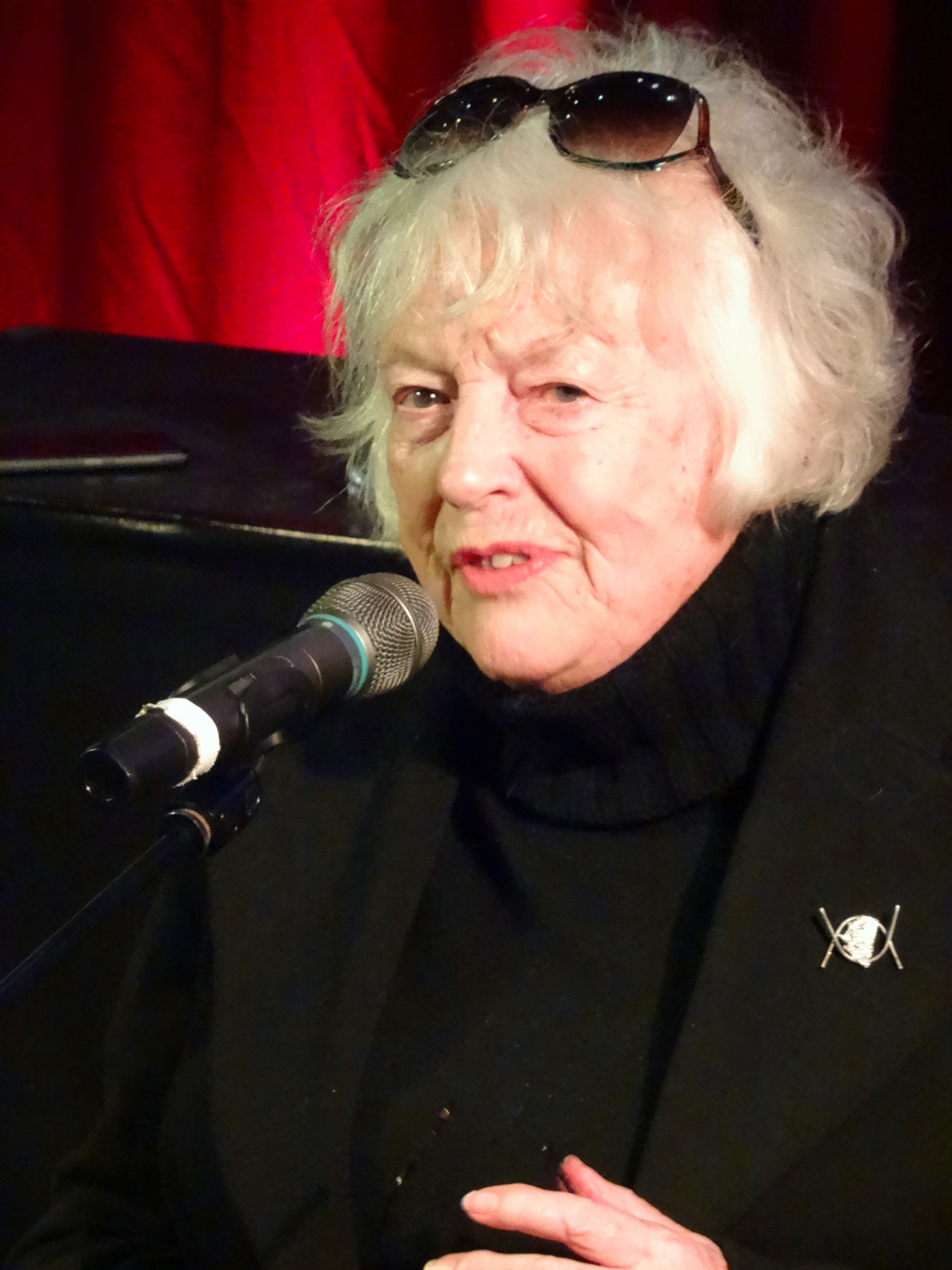
- Berk in 2016
- Born: Marie-Janne van Baaren; 11 July 1932; Zeist, Netherlands
- Died: 5 July 2026 (aged 93); Amsterdam, Netherlands
- Occupations: Writer; actress; singer
- Years active: 1960–2017

Marie-Janne "Marjan" Berk (née van Baaren; 11 July 1932 – 5 July 2026) was a Dutch writer, actress and singer.

In addition to her writing, she worked to help low-literacy communities in the Netherlands and was a founding member of the pro-Palestine action group Stop de Bezetting.

Berk died in Amsterdam on 5 July 2026, at the age of 93.

== Publications ==
- De dag dat de mayonaise mislukte (1983)
- De feminist (1984)
- Berend's binnenwereld (1985)
- Een blonde rat: verhalen (1985)
- Die Überlebenskünstlerin: Roman (1986)
- Rook in de ribben (1987)
- Nooit meer slank (1987)
- Lellen en flantuten (1988)
- Liefde en haat: verhalen (1988)
- De kracht van liefde, of Hallo, daar ben ik weer! roman (1989)
- Glinsteringen (1989)
- Oud is in (1990)
- Motormama: roman (1991)
- Traangas (1992)
- Gijs (1992)
- Dames van stand (1992)
- Nie mehr schlank: Roman einer Frau, die auf ihre Pfunde pfeift (1993)
- Geesje Zoet en het snoepspook (1994)
- Een mooi leesboek (1994)
- Op grote voet (1995)
- Geesje Zoet en de tovertimmerkist (1996)
- Gezonde lucht (1997)
- Niks gemist (1997)
- Onder het oppervlak: vijf verhalen (1998)
- De dikke Berk (1999)
- Als de dood: roman (2000)
- Niet meer bang voor spinnen (2001)
- Toen de wereld jong was (2002)
- Memoires van een dame uit de goot van het amusement (2003)
- Naar het zuiden! (2004)
- Te laat voor de lobelia's (2005)
- Het bloed kruipt: op zoek naar Jacob Cats (2005)
- Zout (2006)
- Nooit te oud! trilogie (2007)
- Vertigo: roman (2007)
- Een goeie truc (2007)
- Rijk! (2008)
- Boek voor Belle (2009)
- Het schreien niet verleerd (2010)
- Kafka leeft: verhalen (2011)
- Ik neem toch een hond (2011)
- Marjan Berk's oma en opa boek (2012)
- Niet meer bang voor spinnen (2012)
- Bedvrienden: erotische episodes (2012)
- Teflonbaby (2014)
- Madonnakindje: over het leven van Catharina van Rennes 1858-1940 (2015)
- Flip (2017)

== Filmography ==
- Vrouwenvleugel (1993–1995)

== Discography ==
- De Kleine parade (1969)
