= Monique van de Ven =

Dutch actress and director (born 1952)

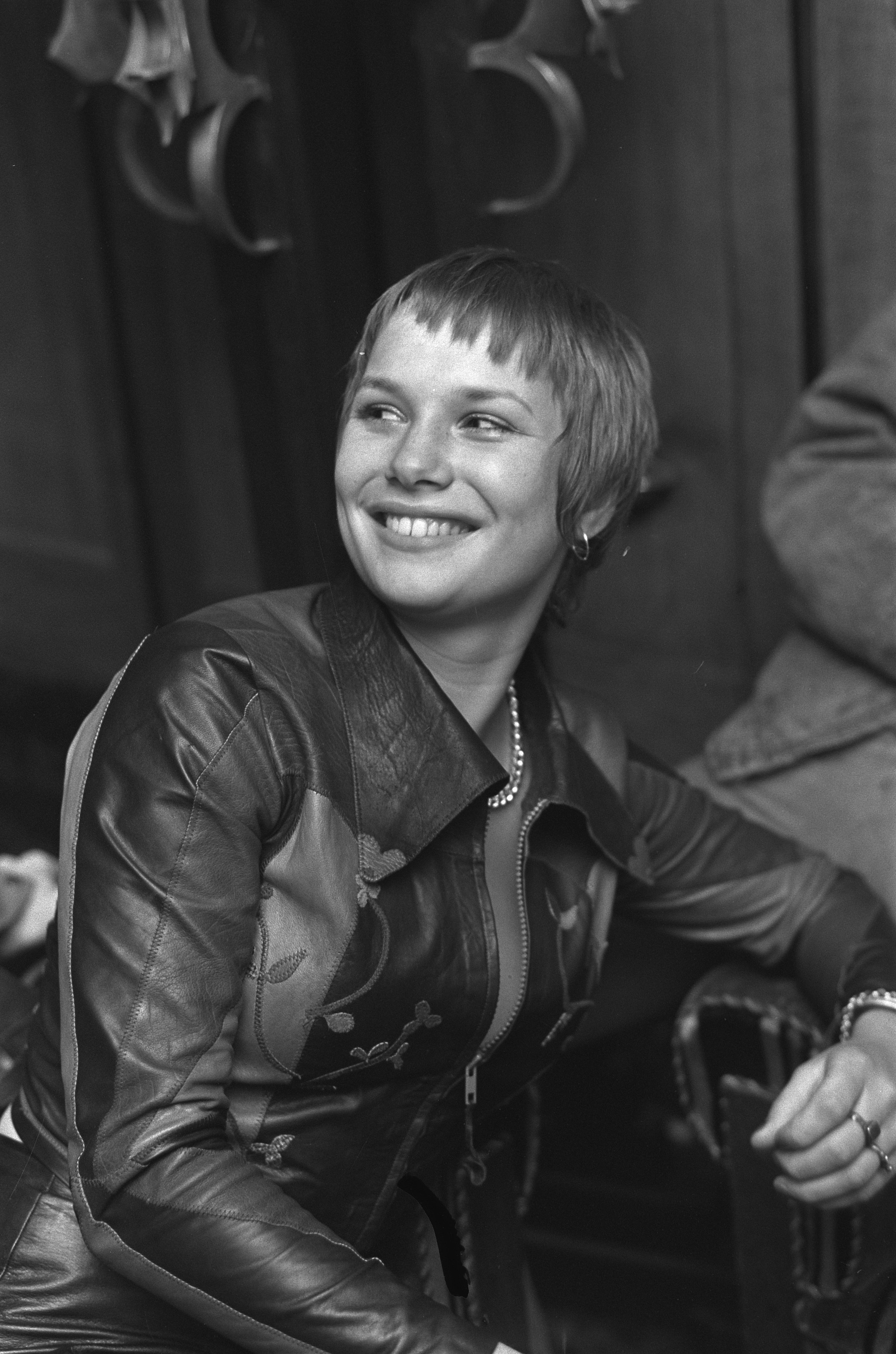
- Van de Ven in 1973
- Born: 28 July 1952 (age 74); Zeeland, North Brabant, Netherlands
- Occupations: Actress; film director
- Years active: 1973–present
- Spouses: Jan de Bont (m. 1973; div. 1988) Edwin de Vries (m. 1991)

Monica Maria Theresia "Monique" van de Ven (Dutch pronunciation: [moːˈnik fɑn də ˈvɛn]; born 28 July 1952) is a Dutch actress and film director.

== Career ==
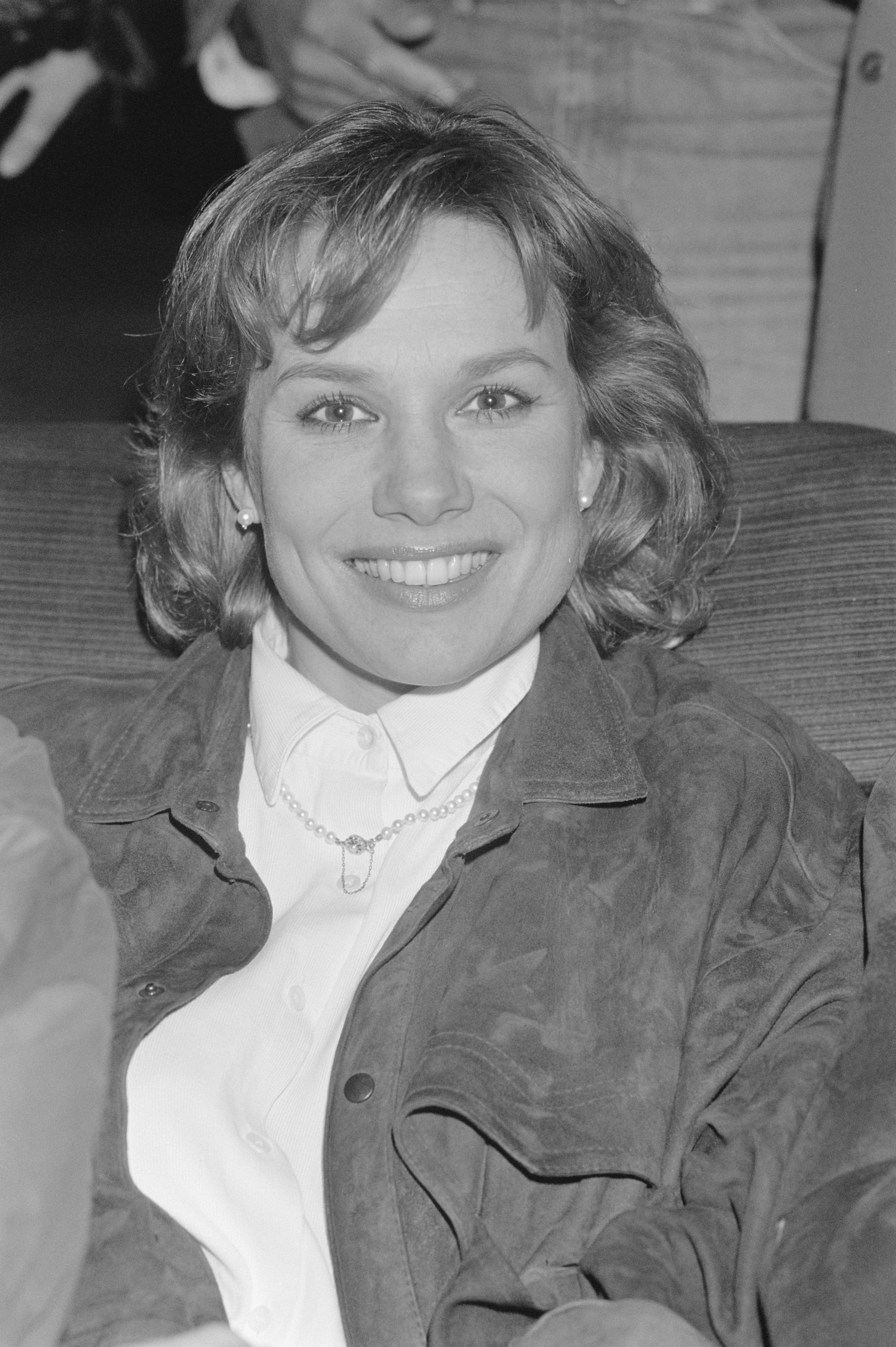
Monique van de Ven in 1988

Van de Ven's film debut as an actress was in the Paul Verhoeven film Turkish Delight in 1973. The film was an immediate breakthrough for her acting career. It was nominated for an Academy Award and was chosen as the best Dutch film of the century. Thirteen years later, she starred in The Assault, which won the 1986 Academy Award for Best International Feature Film.

Apart from acting in feature films, she also performs in Dutch television series and commercials.

In 1996, she directed the short film Mama's Proefkonijn (English translation: 'Mama's Guinea Pig'). Her first feature film as a director, Summer Heat (Zomerhitte), was released 2008, which won the Golden Film award after having sold 100,000 tickets.

== Personal life ==
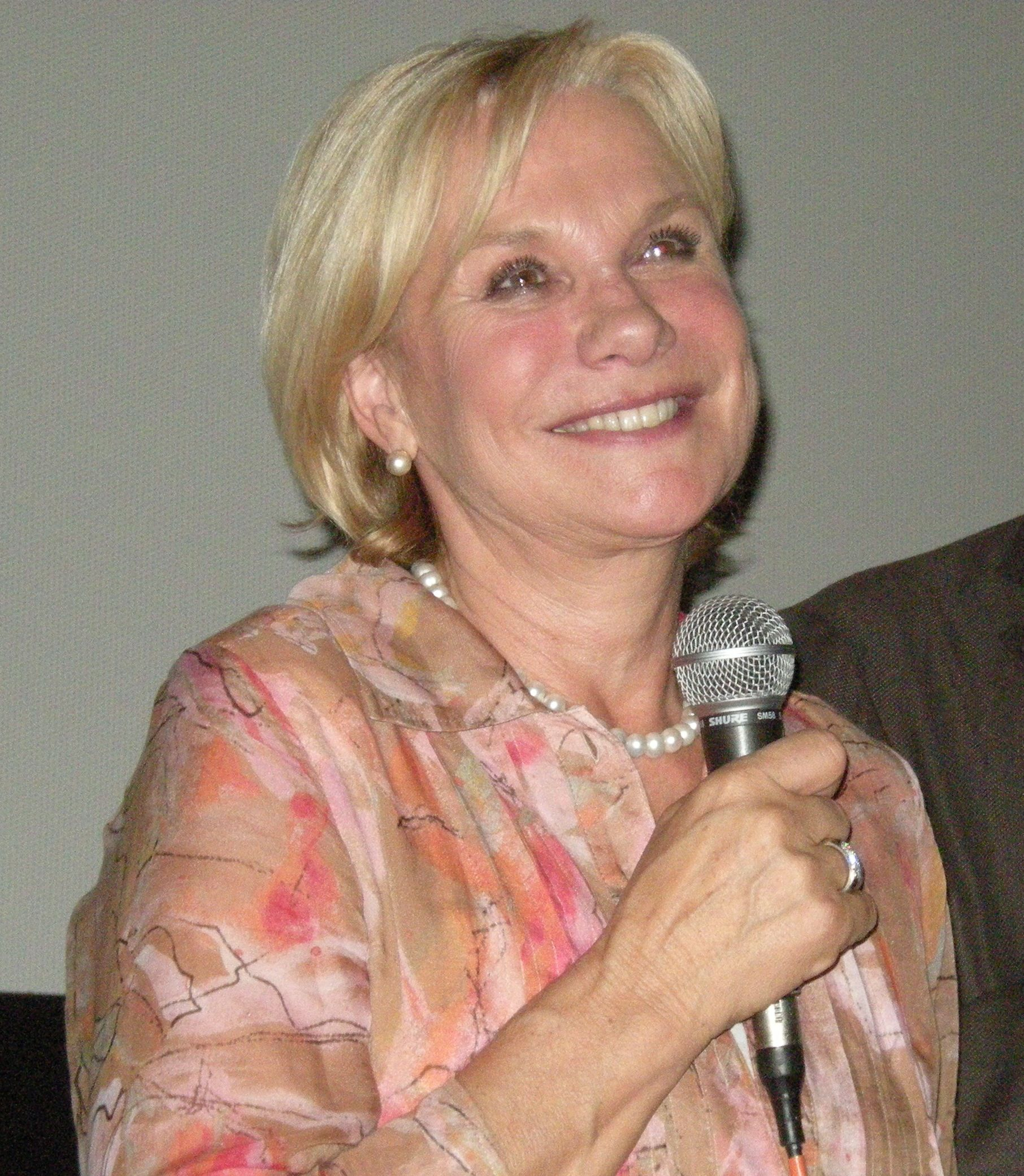
Monique van de Ven in 2008

Between 1973 and 1988, she was married to Dutch cinematographer and director Jan de Bont, with whom she lived in Los Angeles for a number of years. Since 1991, she has been married to actor and writer Edwin de Vries.

== Filmography ==
=== Actress ===
- Turkish Delight (1973)
- Dakota (1974)
- Way Out (1974)
- Katie Tippel (1975)
- The Last Train (1975)
- Starsky & Hutch, series 3, episode 15, "A Body Worth Guarding", original air date, January 25 1978
- Anita Drögemöller und die Ruhe an der Ruhr (1976)
- Doctor Vlimmen (1977)
- Inheritance (1978)
- Stunt Rock (1978)
- A Woman Like Eve (1979)
- Splitting Up (1979)
- Hoge hakken, echte liefde (1981)
- Breach of Contract (1982)
- Breathless (1982)
- Burning Love (1983)
- The Scorpion (1984)
- The Assault (1986)
- A Month Later (1987)
- Iris (1987)
- Amsterdamned (1988)
- Paint It Black (1989)
- De Kassière (Lily Was Here) (1989)
- Romeo (1990)
- The Man Inside (1990)
- Eline Vere (1991)
- The Diamond Brothers: South by South East (1991)
- The Johnsons (1992)
- Long Live the Queen (1995)
- De Bovenman (2001)
- The Discovery of Heaven (2001)
- Amazones (2004)
- Isabelle (2011)
- Daylight (2013)
- Doris (2018)

=== Director ===
- Mama's Proefkonijn (1996)
- Summer Heat (2008)
