= Guido Pieters =

Dutch film director (born 1948)

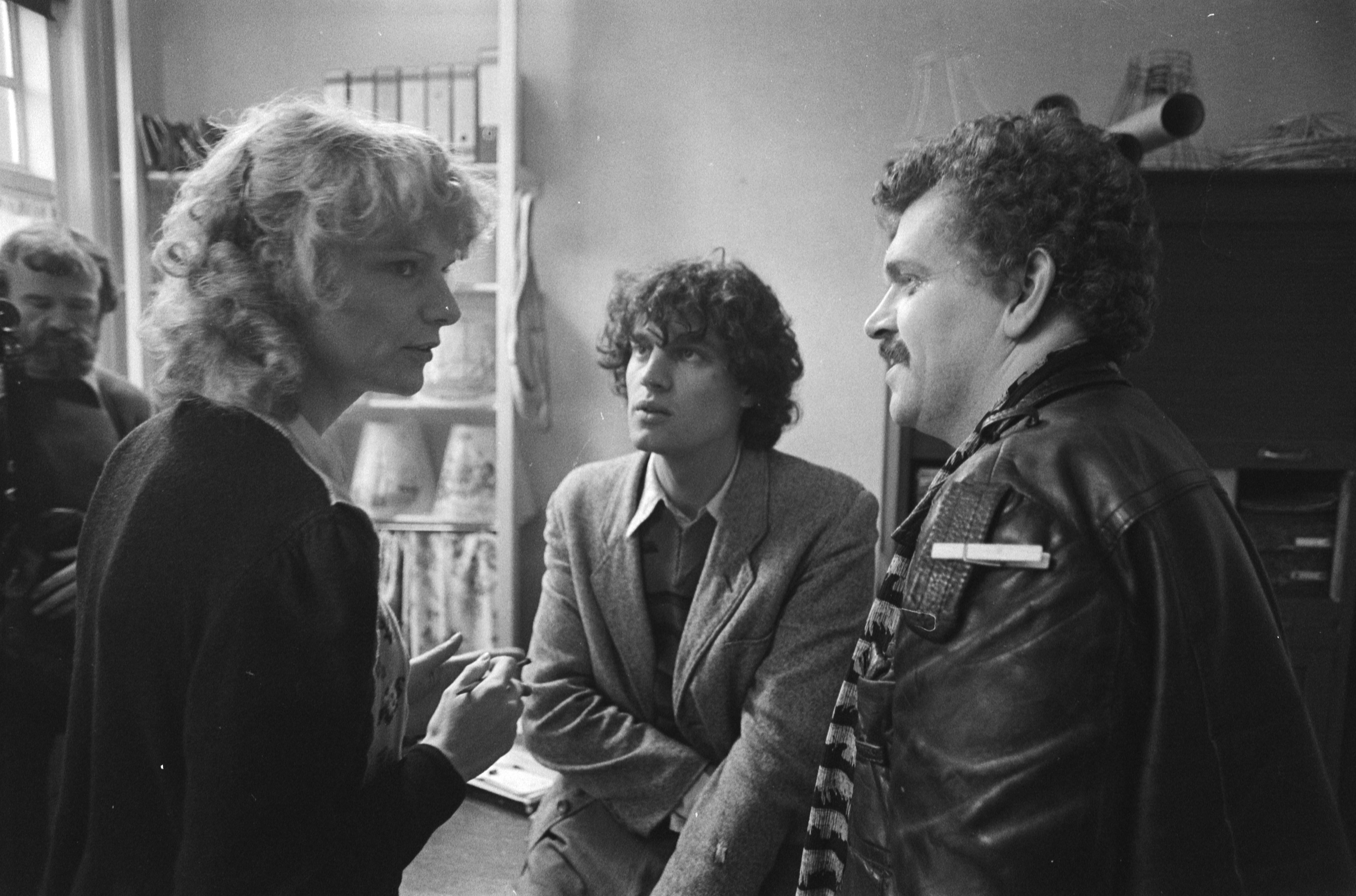
Filmset of the movie Kort Amerikaans in Leiden (The Netherlands), 13 March 1979. Left to right: Tingue Dongelmans, Derek de Lint, Guido Pieters

Guido Pieters (born 1948 in Maastricht) is a Dutch film director. After directing various large Dutch movie projects and successful TV series during the 1980s and early 1990s, Pieters became a productive director in the German TV world.

== Filmography ==
- Doctor Vlimmen (1977)
- Ciske de Rat (1984)
- Op Hoop van Zegen (1986)
- The Black Meteor (2000)
- Het Woeden der Gehele Wereld (2006)
