= Piet Bakker (writer) =

Dutch journalist and author

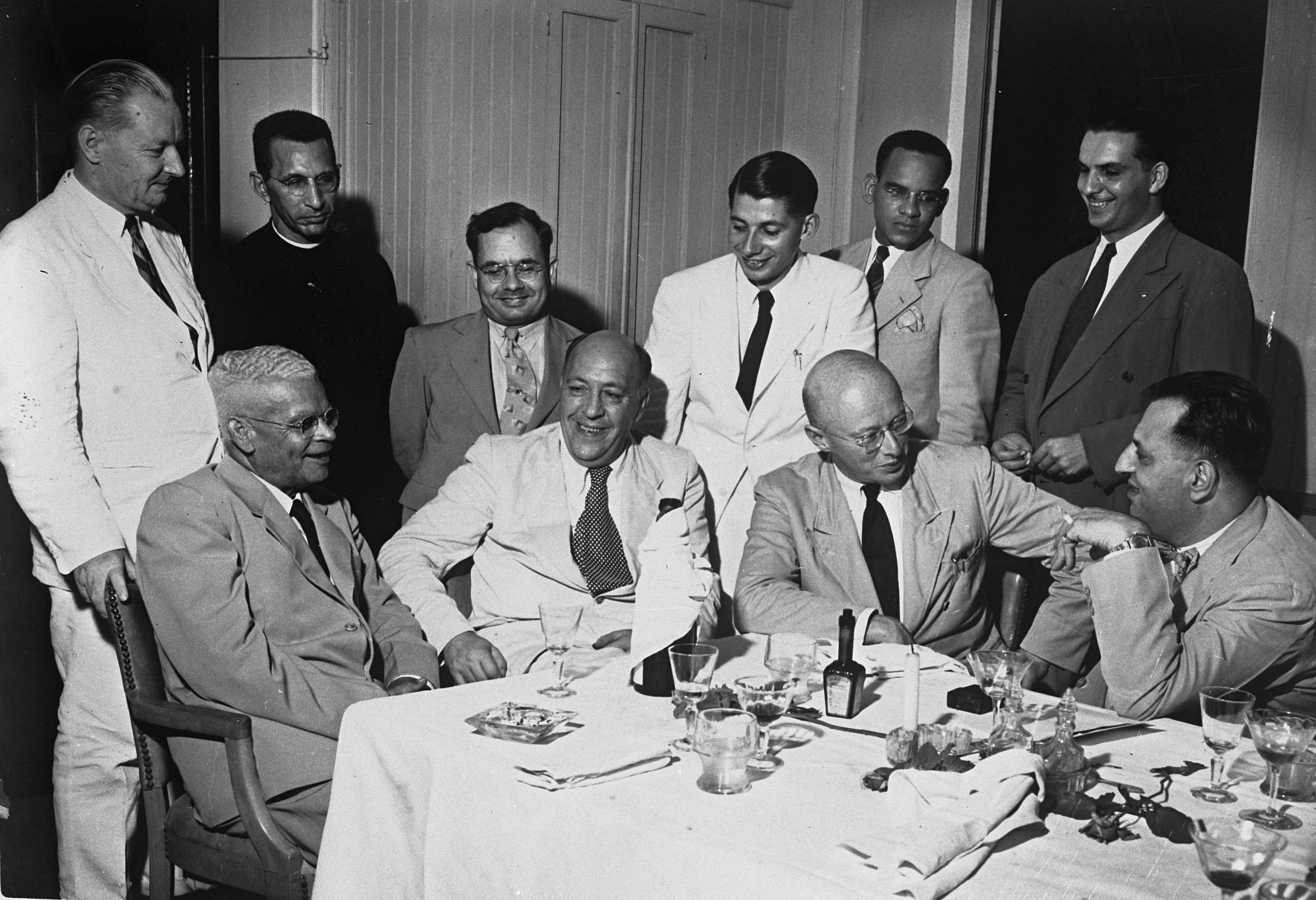
- Bakker (sitting, 2nd from left) in 1947
- Born: Pieter Oege Bakker; 10 August 1897; Rotterdam, Netherlands
- Died: 1 April 1960 (aged 62); Amsterdam, Netherlands

Piet Oege Bakker (10 August 1897 – 1 April 1960) was a Dutch journalist and writer. He was joint editor for many years of the weekly magazine Elseviers Weekblad.

His most famous work was the trilogy written between 1941 and 1946 dealing with the experiences of the street urchin Ciske Vrijmoeth, alias Ciske the Rat. These novels sold in their hundreds of thousands, and later appeared in translation in more than ten other countries. The story has been filmed twice, in 1955 and 1984, and a musical version ran from October 2007 to November 2009.

== See also ==
- Ciske de Rat

== Bibliography (English ed.) ==
- Piet Bakker: Ciske, the rat. Transl. by Celina Wieniewska and Peter Janson-Smith. London, 1958.
  Other ed.: Garden City, NY, Doubleday, 1958

== Sources ==
- (in Dutch) BWSA website: biography
