= Matthijs van Heijningen =

Dutch film producer

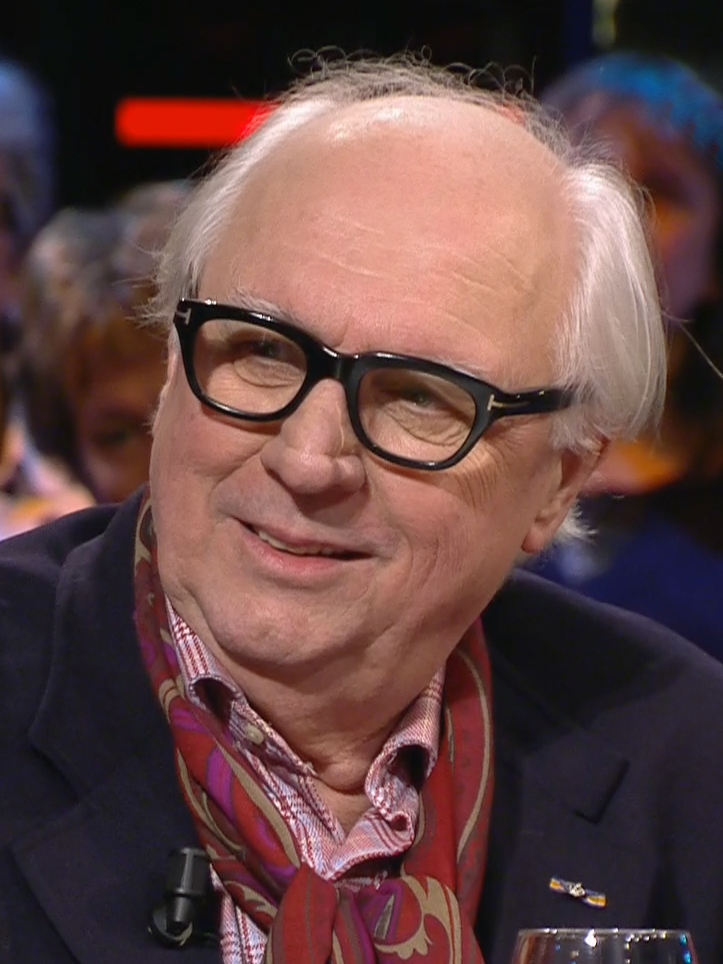
Matthijs van Heijningen

Matthijs van Heijningen (born 17 April 1944 in Alphen aan den Rijn) is a Dutch film producer. He is one of the country's most successful producers, and became known for a series of commercial successes and for screen adaptations of literary works. His collection is now housed in the Filmmuseum.
