= Peter de Smet (disambiguation) =

Peter de Smet (1944–2003) was a Dutch comic-strip artist

Peter de Smet may also refer to:

- Peter A. G. M. De Smet, clinical pharmacologist
- Hendrik Groen (Peter de Smet, born 1954), Dutch writer and author

== See also ==
- Pierre-Jean De Smet (1801–1873), Flemish Catholic missionary in North America
