= De Boezemvriend (film) =

1982 film

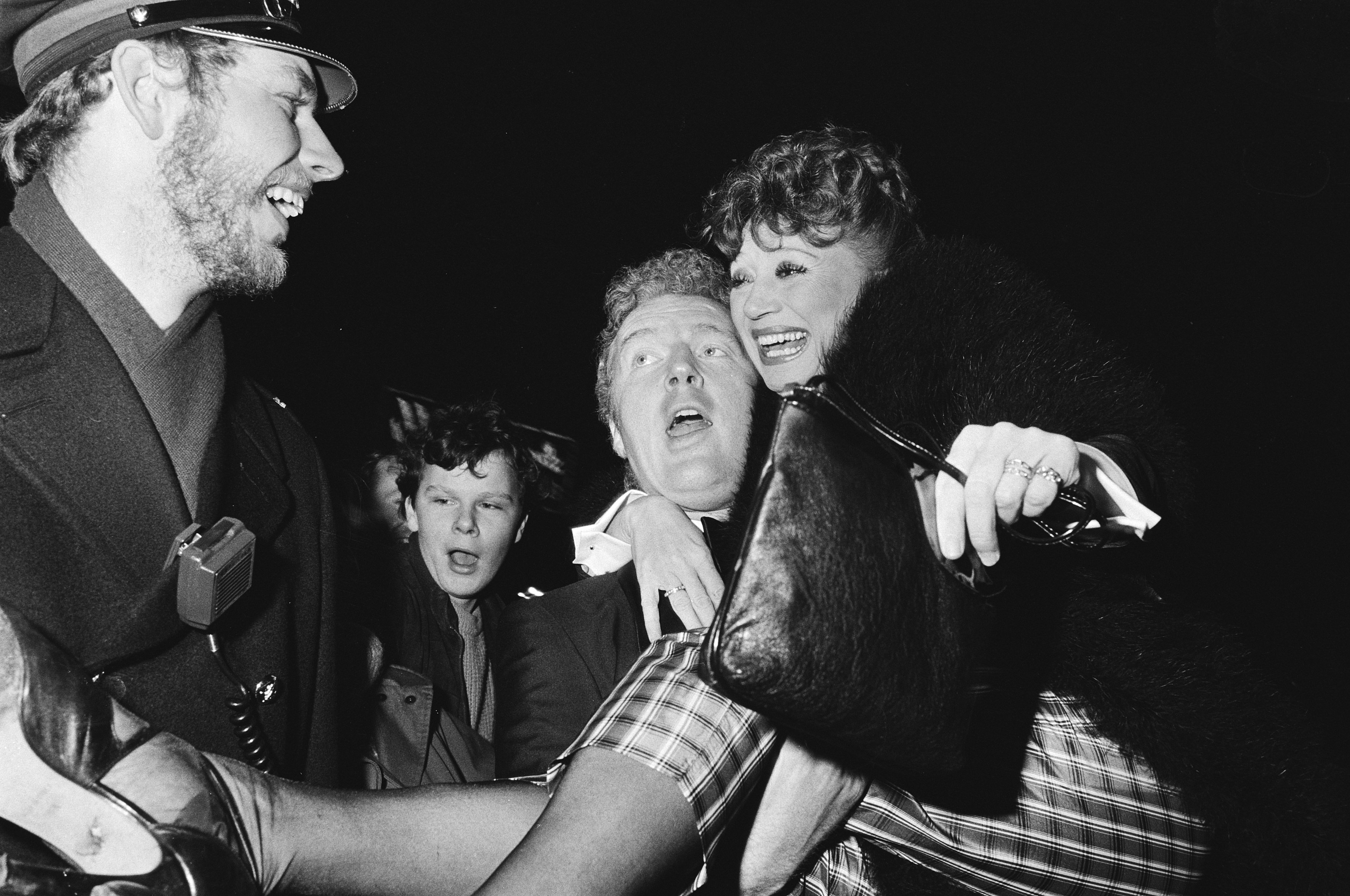
- André van Duin and Corrie van Gorp at the première of De Boezemvriend
- Written by: Nikolai Gogol (play)
- Release date: 1982
- Running time: 95 minutes
- Country: Netherlands
- Language: Dutch

De Boezemvriend (The Bosom Friend) is a 1982 Dutch film directed by Dimitri Frenkel Frank. It is loosely based on Nikolai Gogol's satirical play The Government Inspector. Comedian André van Duin plays the charlatan-dentist Fred van der Zee (Professor Pas-du-Pain) who is mistaken for Napoleon's delegate.

== Plot ==
In 1812, Napoleon is busy preparing for the invasion of Russia when he is struck by a severe toothache, while soldiers are being recruited for this campaign in the Netherlands. In a city square, a traveling quack is making money under the guise of a dentist. Operating under the name Professor Pas-du-pain (real name Fred van der Zee), he is rudely interrupted when French soldiers arrive to take away every able-bodied young man. He manages to escape and gets a lift in the woods from a carnival worker named Mercedes. He instantly falls in love with her but soon has to flee again from bands of robbers. After this grueling ordeal, he arrives at the inn “De Boekanier.” Rattling with hunger, he decides to go inside, even though he doesn’t have a penny to his name. The inn turns out to be populated by freebooters, highwaymen, and other riffraff. Here he orders and devours meal after meal, managing to keep putting off the payment he owes every time.

Meanwhile, the colonel of a local district receives a letter from the court in Paris stating that a red-haired tax inspector is on his way. The corrupt colonel and his equally corrupt entourage are thrown into a frenzy by this announcement. Fred van der Zee, now more dead than alive from the endless eating, is mistaken for the inspector and is beaten up by rough highwaymen at the inn. He is rescued and taken to the colonel’s castle. After realizing he is being mistaken for the inspector, he decides to play along and takes advantage of the luxury offered to him. The colonel even wants to marry his daughter Sophie off to him. Once Van der Zee’s true nature is revealed, he flees the castle, with the colonel and his men pursuing him. Once he reaches the local fair, Fred van der Zee meets Napoleon and manages to pull his sore tooth, whereupon Napoleon declares him to be his bosom friend.

== Cast ==
- André van Duin - Fred van der Zee
- Leen Jongewaard - Colonel Moeskop
- Geert de Jong - The Colonel's wife
- Manouk van der Meulen - Sofie, the Colonel's daughter
- Henk Reijn - Adjudant
- Hans Leendertse - Mayor
- Tetske van Ossewaarde - The Mayor's wife
- Ischa Meijer - Police commissioner
- Hannah de Leeuwe - Police commissioner's wife
- Frans Mulder - Municipal clerk
- Maeve van der Steen - Municipal clerk's wife
- Connie Breukhoven - Mercedes
- Corrie van Gorp - Madam Tilly
- Jérôme Reehuis - Napoleon
- Frans van Dusschoten - Field marshal
- Marjolein Sligte - Revue artist
- André Hazes - Restaurateur of the Inn
- Jon Bluming - Visitor of the Inn
- Manke Nelis - Singer
- Tonny Eyk - Accordion player
- Herbert Joeks - Dentist's patient
- Carol van Herwijnen - The Emperor's Inspector
