= Jennifer Willems =

Dutch actress (1947–2015)

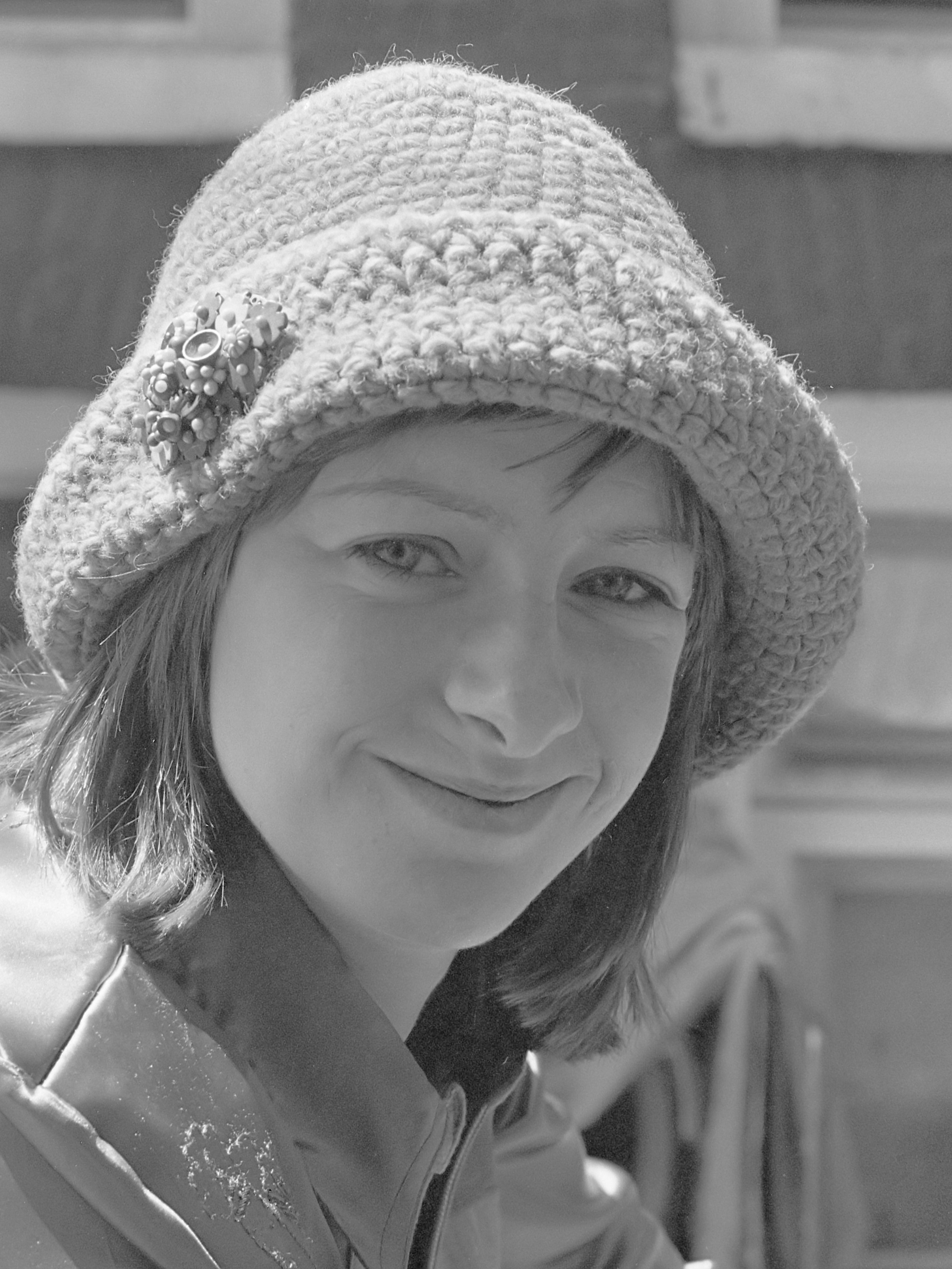
- Jennifer Willems on 18 June 1973
- Born: August 13, 1947; The Hague, South Holland, Netherlands
- Died: November 13, 2015 (aged 68)
- Occupation: Actress

Jennifer Willems (13 August 1947 – 13 November 2015) was a Dutch actress, well known in film and television, particularly for her role in the children's television series De film van ome Willem (1974-1989). Her other notable roles included the ones in the films Naked Over the Fence (1974) and Keetje Tippel (1975).

== Selected filmography ==
- The Burglar (1972)
- Naked Over the Fence (1973)
- Het Jaar van de Kreeft (1975)
- Keetje Tippel (1975)
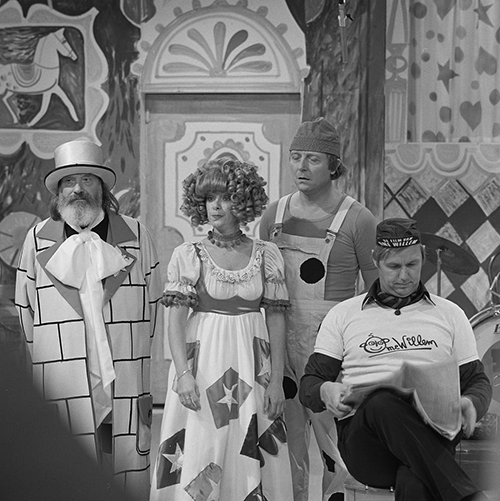
Jennifer Willems shooting for De film van Ome Willem, on 24 September 1981

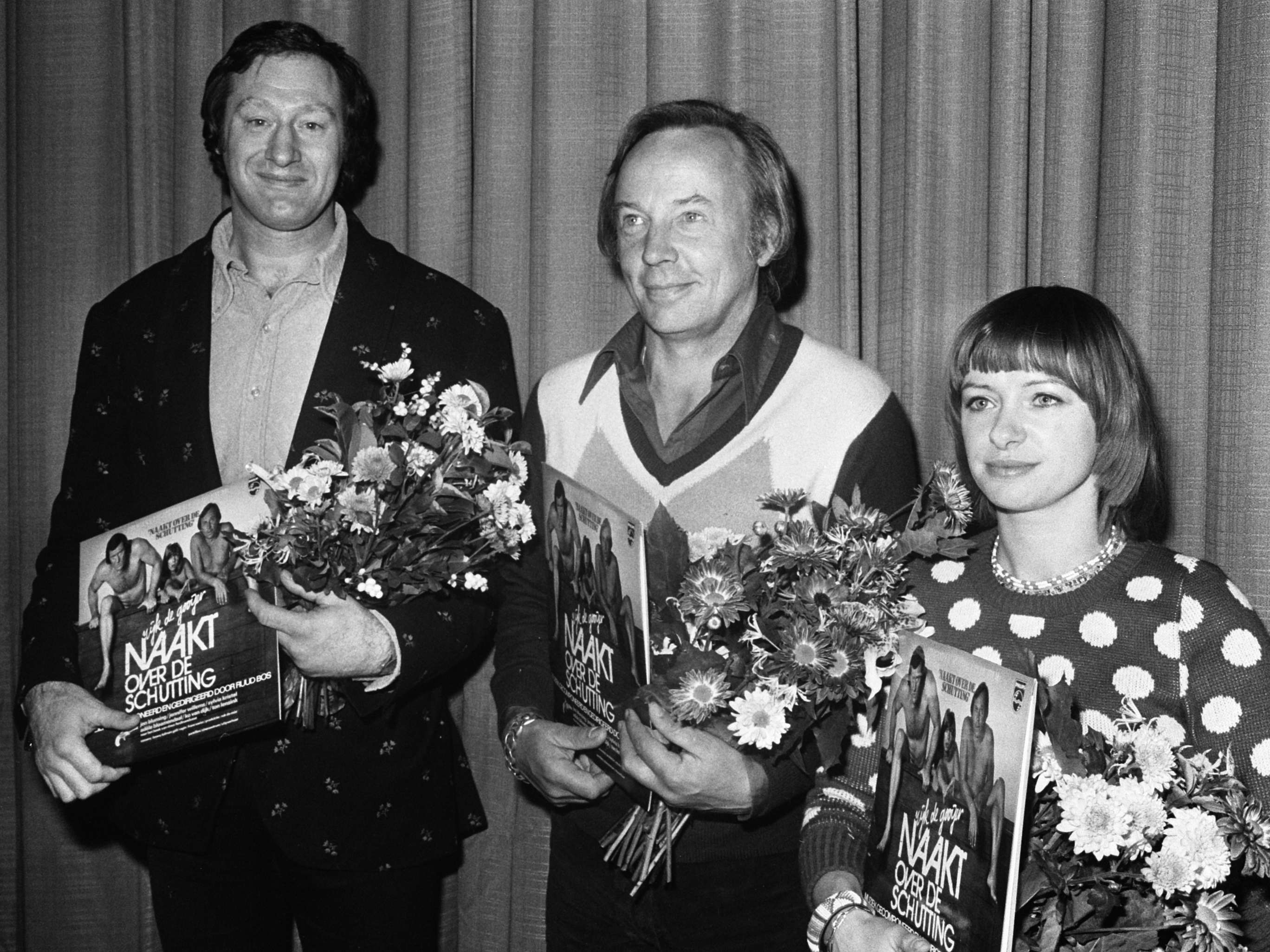
Jon Bluming, Rijk de Gooyer and Jennifer Willems at the première of Naakt over de schutting (Naked Over the Fence)
