= Tonny Eyk =

Dutch musician (1940–2025)

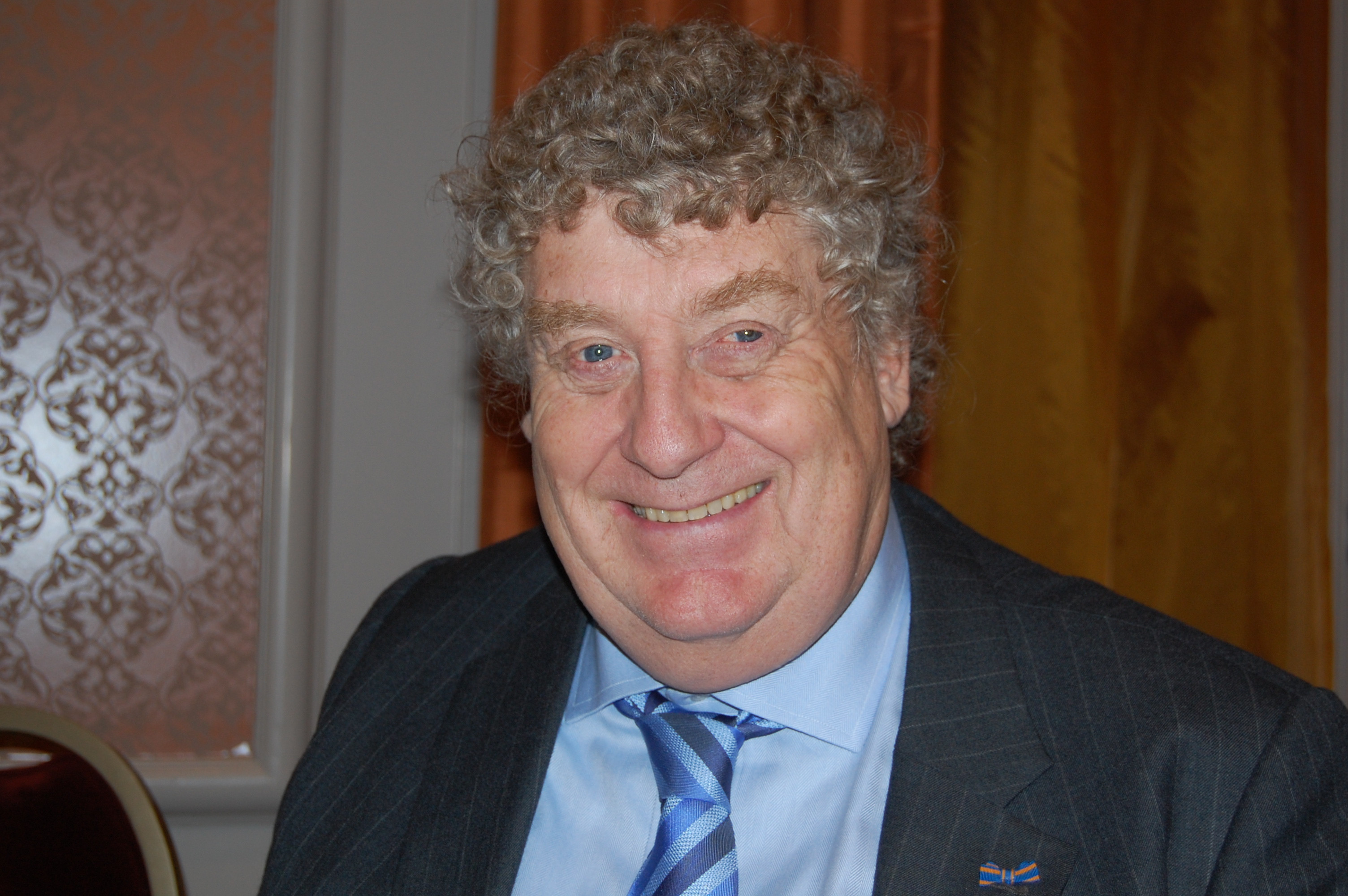
- Eyk in 2008
- Born: Teun Eikelboom; 4 July 1940; The Hague, German-occupied Netherlands
- Education: Royal Conservatory of The Hague
- Known for: Television, film, writer, arranger, composer
- Spouse: Liesbeth Vasbinder
- Awards: Golden Harp

Teun Eikelboom (4 July 1940) better known as Tonny Eyk, a Dutch composer, arranger, pianist, bandleader, producer, entertainer, columnist and writer. He was also known for his appearances as a jury member in various television shows including Sterrenslag, Soundmixshow and Mini Playbackshow. His first book, Met Tonny Eyk naar de Provence (Go with Tonny Eyk to Provence), combines his love of the Tour de France and French gastronomy. Eyk was also an ambassador of the Dutch company Princess Household Appliances. He graduated by majoring in trombone at the Royal Conservatory in The Hague.

== Life and career ==
Eyk was born on 4 July 1940. He made countless television appearances and has been involved with Dutch Television experienced from its very beginning. This included Experimental TV in 1950, the opening of the second Dutch TV Net (1964), The first Colour TV Broadcast (1967 from the Firato, the opening of the third Dutch TV Netherlands 3 (for which he wrote all the music) and the first Dutch advertising broadcast in 1963 (Mecom TV). Eyk has worked with world stars such as Dame Edna Everidge, Tommy Cooper, Toots Thielemans, Ringo Starr, The Three Degrees, Oleta Adams and Danny Kaye. He partnered his twin sister Jeanette, with whom he since 1947 an accordion duo had, in the European 1958 act for the legendary Rock and Roll King, "Bill Haley and his Comets" (the world's first pop concert was banned in the Netherlands).

With Rudi Carrell, Eyk made a tour for the Dutch troops in 1962 in New Guinea, and later in 1980 he was the musical director for Rudi's TV shows in Germany, including “Die Sieben Verflixte” and “Rudi's Urlaub Show. In 1980, Eyk performed with his combo at the inauguration of Beatrix as queen of The Netherlands and again in 2005, at her 25-year jubilee reign at the Knight's Hall (Ridderzaal) of Dutch States General States General of the Netherlands of the Netherlands parliament (Staten-Generaal van het Koninkrik der Nederlanden) in the Binnenhof in The Hague.

Eyk has made hundreds of compositions both in the light and in the classical music genres. He wrote the theme music for shows including Top Pop, NOS Studio Sport, 1-2-3-show, the repertoire for Van Kooten en De Bie (“Ballen in mijn buik”-Balls in my stomach,”De Tegenpartij” and many others.), the cinematic film 'Number 14' (the Johan Cruijff story), hits for “Kinderen voor Kinderen” (Children for Children) - (“Op een onbewoond Eiland”-On a desert island and “Ik heb zo waanzinnig gedroomd” - I had such a crazy dream), and for many television series (including the De stille kracht, the Zevensprong (TV series) and Hollands Glorie (TV series). Also he composed symphonic works, such as the Willem van Oranje (TV series) Suite (for Jaap van Zweden) and Capriccio for symphony orchestra and Combo commissioned by the Holland Festival '79. For decades the "Anthem Ceremony Protoculaire UCI" played during all cycling world championships was a composition by Eyk.

=== The Two Jeateux ===
The musical career of Eyk started in 1947. Together with his twin sister Jeanette (actually Sjaantje Eikelenboom) when aged seven years they formed an accordion duo called the Les Deux Jeateux. This name was a combination of their own two names. The duo soon became a well-known act on the post-war variety circuit and they performed with such great artists as Lou Bandy, Albert de Booy, Heintje Davids, Willy Vervoort, Max van Praag, Eddy Christiani, De Spelbrekers and Cees de Lange. In 1950, they made their radio debut in the VARA 'Amateurs zetten hun beste beentje voor’ (Amateurs put their best foot forward) program and they followed this with a performance for the then Dutch experimental television project in Eindhoven. They first worked abroad in 1952 and played in a movie theatre in Liège performing between the news and the featured film. In 1954, Jeanette and Eyk made a tour of Italy with their accordion teacher Addy Kleijngeld.

At the age of 14, exactly on 1 July 1955, the duo became professional. That year, on 12 November, they were seen for the first time on television in the NCRV program 'Blokband’ and as a result of this, they were invited to perform on the highly popular radio show of Johan Bodegraven : "Alle hens aan dek met Mastklimmen” (All hands on deck with Mast Climbing). They appeared regularly with their accordion act in many variety shows and also for Dutch soldiers (including La Courtine) and went on tour for Belgian soldiers stationed in Germany. Eyk also accompanied as pianist various jugglers, comedians, singers, magicians and clowns. In 1957, the duo received a contract with the famous Heck's Lunchroom on Amsterdam's Rembrandtplein (Rembrandt Square) and in 1959 their first record was released by Delahaye Records.

In addition to performances with Les Deux Jeateux, Eyk performed a lot of solo work. He did gigs in nightclubs and worked as a pianist in the orchestra of the then-popular singer Annie de Reuver. From 1958 to 1965, he studied trombone at the Royal Conservatory of The Hague with Anner Bylsma sr. and played in the orchestra class conducted by Louis Stotijn with whom he privately studied conducting. In 1960, in Italy, Eyk scored a hit with the song “Addio Piccolina” (sung by Rocco Montana). From 1963, he conducted various radio ensembles including VARA Musette Orchestra and Koffiekamer Sounds (NCRV). He formed the Tonny Eyk-Quartet with Eddy Christiani as vocalist and guitarist.

=== Solo career ===
In 1964, Eyk married Elizabeth Vasbinder, a former dancer of the Dutch and Dutch National Ballet. He was also the supervisor for the popular duo Willy Alberti and Willeke Alberti. For the KRO radio program Nationale Vereniging de Zonnebloem from Alex Wayenburg, he debuted André van Duin and Willem Nijholt as vocalists..

In the late sixties Eyk began some big foreign tours with various groups of Dutch artists (Willy Alberti and Willeke Alberti, Johnny Jordaan, Cees de Lange, world champion magician Fred Kaps, Toby Rix with his toeteriks, singers Conny Vandenbos and Conny Vink and many others). He gave concerts for Dutch emigrants in Australia, New Zealand, United States, Canada, Curacao, Suriname and in South Africa. At this time, Eyk was increasingly in demand for TV programs and he became the musical director of some legendary programs, including ‘Voor de Vuist Weg’ and ‘Muziekmozaïek’ (with Willem Duys), Mies Bouwman, Telebingo, ‘Nieuwe Oogst’ (New Harvest), the Ronnie Tober Shows, ‘Johnny & Rijk’, ‘de KRO komt langs’, ‘Brandpunt’, the ‘1-2-3-show', the Carré Shows, ‘De show van de Maand’, ‘Werk in Uitvoering’ (with Willem Nijholt). He was also responsible for many children's series such as ‘Bibelebons’, ‘De Poppenkraam, ‘De Holle Bolle Boom’, ‘De Zevensprong’, ‘De Bende van hiernaast’, ‘Thomas en Senior’, ‘Mijn Idee’ and many others. He also composed the music for among others the TV series ‘Kant aan mijn Broek’, ‘Vanoude mensen de dingen die voorbij gaan’, ‘de Verlossing’ and for Teleac: ‘Vamos a Ver’. His work for television the music was largely arranged by Jaap Hofland.

Eyk appeared during the FIFA World Cup in 1974 for the Dutch national team in Germany where coach Rinus Michels sang ‘Dreamland’ for his players

At the request of Pieter van Vollenhoven, Eyk became part of the grand piano group ‘Gevleugelds Vrienden’. He also accompanied Princess Juliana singing two cabaret songs on a single.

Eyk conducted the "Gala of the Century' (100 years Royal Theatre Carré) and made record and CD recordings with The Skymasters Big Band, Jan Blaaser, Willy Alfredo, Theo en Thea, Alex Hare, The Blue Diamonds, AVRO's children's choir, the Wamas and many more. Eyk was very popular with the KRO television program ‘Klassewerk’, He was also chairman of the jury of the ‘Mini-playbackshow’. With lyricist Herman Pieter de Boer, Eyk wrote hits for ‘Kinderen voor Kinderen’ (Children for Children). Also for the cinematic film Soul Mate (with André van Duin), he wrote the music and Eyk accompanied Hans Teeuwen in his film ‘Gewoon Hans’. For the AVRO television program ‘AVRO's Sterrenslag’, he was for many years a participant and referee. From 1990, Eyk made many performances abroad. At the request of Aad Ouborg (from Princess Household Appliances), he worked with the famous Master Chef Cas Spijkers fifteen times in Hong Kong. They travelled the world over (Curacao, Chicago, China, Japan, Malaysia) and made various television recordings including ‘The Big Buffet Show’ in Singapore. In Shanghai Eyk in 2005, he made videos for his children's hits (‘Op een onbewoond eiland’-On a desert island and Ik heb zo waanzinnig gedroomd- I had such a crazy dream’. These numbers were even sung in Chinese by the Shanghai TV children's choir. In 2011, his composition ‘Capriccio' for Strings was performed by The Fancy Fiddlers and in St. Petersburg by the St.Petersburg Chamber Orchestra 'Carpe Diem'.

=== Collector ===
Eyk was a big cycling fan and was internationally known as a collector of cycling jerseys (only champion and ranking jerseys). This large collection was in 2010 exhibited by the ‘Lotto’ ( Lottery) in the Library of Rotterdam. He also collected cookbooks.

=== Television music ===
Eyk wrote tunes for many television programs and performed regularly with other famous artists. He was best known for the theme tune of the NOS Studio Sport programme and for compositions for ‘Van Kooten en de Bie’.

=== Death ===
Eyk died on 13 December 2025, at the age of 85.

== Television themes ==
For the following Dutch television he wrote the theme song;

- 1962–1963 Wilde Ganzen
- 1968–1970 Scala (NTS)
- 1968–1970 Doebiedoe
- 1970–1988 AVRO's TopPop
- 1972–1989 Klassewerk
- 1972 – heden NOS Studio Sport
- 1973–1983 AVRO's Wie-kent-kwis
- 1978–1989 Klassewerk
- 1978 – NOS-theme song
- 1979–1985 AVRO's Puzzeluur
- 1980–1986 1-2-3-show
- 1981–1985 Babbelonië
- 1981–1992 Teleac-theme song
- 1985–1993 Wedden, dat..?
- 1986–1988 Brandpunt (televisieprogramma)
- 1986–1995 Dinges
- 1988–1994 RVU-theme song
- 1989–1996 Boggle
- 1989 – Socutera-theme song
- 1993–1994 Meer op Zondag (NOS)
- 1993–1998 Kookgek
- 1994–1995 Topscore

== Foreign television themes ==
For the next German television he wrote the theme song;

- 1984–1987 Die verflixte 7(WDR)
- 1985–1990 Kinder in der Kiste (ARD)
- 1987–1988 Die Oma-Opa-Mama-Papa Guck Mal Show (WDR)
- 1991–1997 Rudi's Lacharchiv
- 1993 – The Post Has Gone (RTL)
- Rudigramme (RTL)
- 1992–1993 Rudi's Tierschow

== Orchestra leader ==
For the following television programs Eyk was the conductor;

- 1963–1965 Kijk die Rijk
- 1964–1965 Johnny & Rijk shows
- 1966–1967 De Ronnie Tober-shows
- 1966–1979 Voor de vuist weg
- 1968–1969 De Max Tailleur-shows
- 1974–1976 Muziekmozaïek
- 1974–1985 Studio Vrij
- 1975–1980 Bij Ons In....
- 1978 Netwerk
- 1979–1981 Telebingo
- 1980–1981 De K.R.O. Komt Langs In
- 1981–1982 Mies
- 1983–1984 Nieuwe Oogst
- 1980–1986 1-2-3-show
- 1985–1986 De Willem Nijholt shows
- 1989 Harten-Gala's
- De Carré-shows (Variété-shows, 8-delige serie AVRO)

== Other music for television ==
- 1972–1975 Bibelebons
- 1974–1975 De stille kracht
- 1974–1975 De verlossing
- 1974–1998 Van Kooten en De Bie
- 1975–1976 Van oude mensen, de dingen die voorbijgaan
- 1975–1978 De Holle Bolle Boom
- 1977–1978 Hollands Glorie
- 1977–1979 De Luchtbus
- 1978–1979 Kant aan m'n broek
- 1979–1980 De Boris en Bramshow
- 1980–1985 De Poppenkraam
- 1980–1990 Kinderen voor Kinderen
- 1982–1983 De Zevensprong
- 1983–1984 Willem van Oranje
- 1983–1997 Hints
- 1984–1985 Knokken voor twee
- 1984–1990 Mini-playbackshow
- 1985–1988 Thomas en Senior
- 1985–1991 Mijn idee
- 1988 Jingles en Tunes Nederland 3

== Film music ==
- 1973 – Nummer 14
- 1976 – Peter en de vliegende autobus
- 1979 – Martijn en de Magiër
- 1980 – De Bende van Hiernaast
- 1982 – De Boezemvriend
- 1982 – Knokken voor twee
- 1985 – Maria
- 1989 – Kunst- en Vliegwerk
- 2009 – Gewoon Hans (with Hans Teeuwen)

== Writer ==
Eyk was also a writer. He published five books on France. He also wrote articles in various magazines, including the magazine ‘Zakenreis’ (Business trip), ‘De Wijnkrant’ en ‘Côte & Provence’. For 22 years he wrote articles for the former newspaper ‘Het Nieuws van de Dag’. For many years, he had a column in the daily newspaper De Telegraaf. During the Tour de France he wrote daily columns.

Commissioned by Buma / Stemra, he wrote "The Forgotten Chapter" (the Dutch Variety). For Princess Appliances he published several culinary books. (‘Lounging with Princess’ and ‘Vitamin Festival’).

He wrote several other books.

- 2000 – Richting Zuiden (Direction South)
- 2000 – Een Weekend Weg met Tonny Eyk (A Weekend Away with Tonny Eyk)
- 2002 – Leve het Goede Leven in Frankrijk (Long Live the Good Life in France)
- 2004 – Frankrijk en Route (France en Route)
- 2007 – Het Nieuwe Reisboek Richting Zuiden (The New travel book going South)
- 2010 – Smullen en Genieten in Frankrijk (Taste and enjoy in France)
