= Naked over the Fence =

1973 film by Frans Weisz

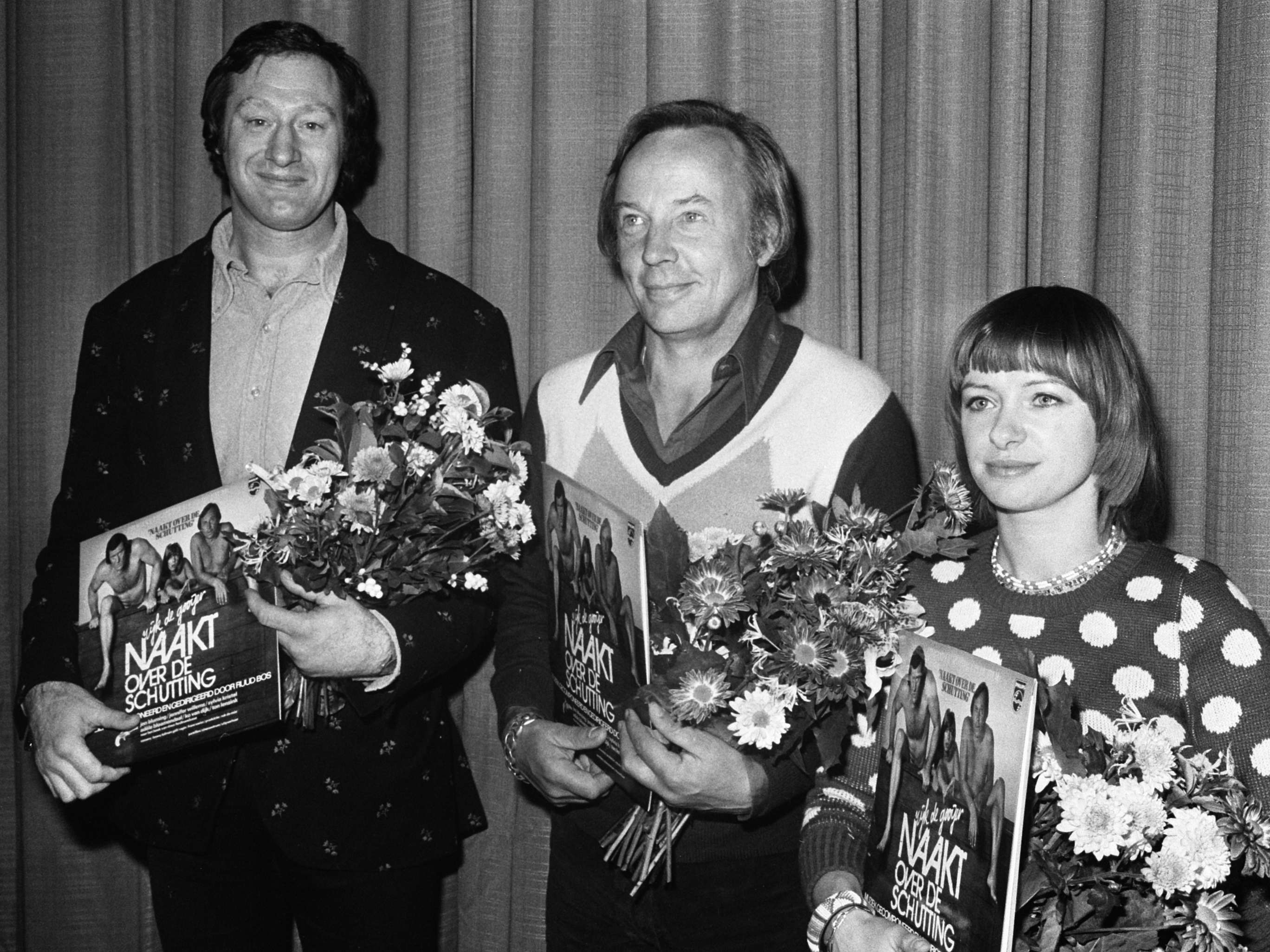
- Jon Bluming, Rijk de Gooyer and Jennifer Willems at the première of Naakt over de schutting
- Directed by: Frans Weisz
- Written by: Rinus Ferdinandusse; Rob du Mée
- Produced by: Rob du Mée
- Starring: Rijk de Gooyer; Jennifer Willems; Jon Bluming; Adèle Bloemendaal; Sylvia Kristel; Ton Lensink
- Music by: Ruud Bos
- Release date: 1973
- Running time: 95 minutes
- Country: Netherlands

Naked over the Fence (Original title: Naakt over de schutting) is a 1973 Dutch film by Frans Weisz starring Rijk de Gooyer, Jennifer Willems, Jon Bluming and Sylvia Kristel.

It was released in France in 1977 and recorded admissions of 15,981.

== Plot ==
Rick Lemming lives in the centre of Amsterdam. He runs a gambling hall, and keeps pigeons on his rooftop as a hobby. He rents a room in his house to schoolteacher Penny van der Laan. Rick is close friends with karate champion Ed Swaan.

One evening, when Rick and Penny go to watch Ed’s comeback match, they meet Ed’s girlfriend, the singer Lilly Marischka, and her TV crew. It soon turns out that Lilly has to agree to appear in a porn film in exchange for help building her career. Under the pretext of shooting an 'art film,' Ed is also dragged into the production.

When Rick sneaks in to take a look, he sees things getting out of hand at the film studio, and Ed and Lilly refuse to cooperate any further. When Lilly demands the film back, they are threatened and are therefore forced to flee “naked over the fence” to Ed’s gym, and from there to Rick’s house. Their clothes are left behind at the film studio.

The next day, the men go investigating together and uncover a number of shady practices by the TV executives, who are not about to let their porn plans be thwarted and would prefer to get rid of the determined Rick. As a result, Rick even ends up thrown in a canal before being rescued by Ed. Through the murder of the studio boss, an attack on Lilly, the murder of a too-loose-lipped girlfriend, and the kidnapping of Penny to get the film back, the story culminates in a spectacular tram chase through Amsterdam. The villains are eventually apprehended, Rick can return to his pigeons, Penny to her students, and Lilly to her beloved Ed.

== Cast ==
- Rijk de Gooyer as Rick Lemming
- Jennifer Willems as Penny van der Laan, a schoolteacher
- Jon Bluming as Ed Swaan, a karateka
- Sylvia Kristel as Lilly Marischka, a singer
- Jérôme Reehuis as Lode Zaayer, a journalist
- Ton Lensink as Floor van de Terpe, a TV director
- Jerry Brouer as Otto "Boeboe" Van Halsden, a financier
- Adèle Bloemendaal as Celia Strumpf, his sister and Floor's fiancée
- Marc Maalderink as Haaks, a film studio owner
- Ko van Dijk as Joop de Heer, a police inspector
- Lodewijk Sijses as Max, Cas's twin brother and Van Halsden's henchman
- Hans Sijses as Cas, Max's twin brother and Van Halsden's henchman
- Olga Zuiderhoek as Molly, one half of the singing Vink sisters
- Carola Gijsbers van Wijk as Dolly, the other half of the singing Vink sisters
- Frans Halsema as Puck, a TV show host
- Rinus Ferdinandusse as a record company PR man
- Jaap Stobbe as a gambling hall employee
- Ed Lautenschlager as a TV newsreader
