= André van Duin =

Dutch comedian (born 1947)

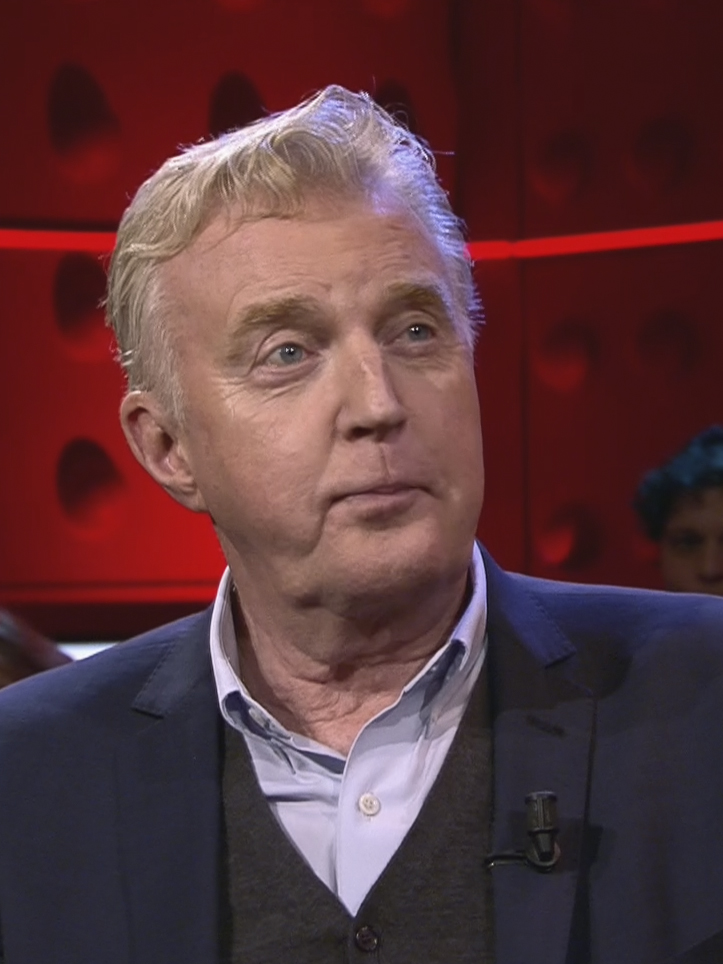
- André van Duin in 2018
- Born: Adrianus Marinus Kloot; 20 February 1947 (age 79); Rotterdam, Netherlands
- Occupations: Comedian, actor, voice actor, singer-songwriter, author, television presenter, television director, television producer, screenwriter
- Years active: 1964–present
- Spouse: Martin Elferink (2006–2020)
- Partner: Wim van der Pluym (1974–1995)

Adrianus Marinus Kyvon (né Kloot; 20 February 1947), known by his stage name André van Duin, is a Dutch comedian, singer-songwriter and television presenter. Van Duin is one of the Netherlands' best known entertainers, with a career spanning over six decades.

== Early life ==
Van Duin was born as Adrianus Kloot, but with "Kloot" being a Dutch slur, he took the name "André van Duin" instead, while his family officially changed their surname to "Kyvon". Van Duin grew up in Rotterdam, was interested in performing at a young age and developed an image as the class clown, partially due to his red hair. After primary school, he went to the LTS to become a machinist, but later worked as an office clerk and a warehouse employee.

== Career ==
=== 1960s: Breakthrough ===
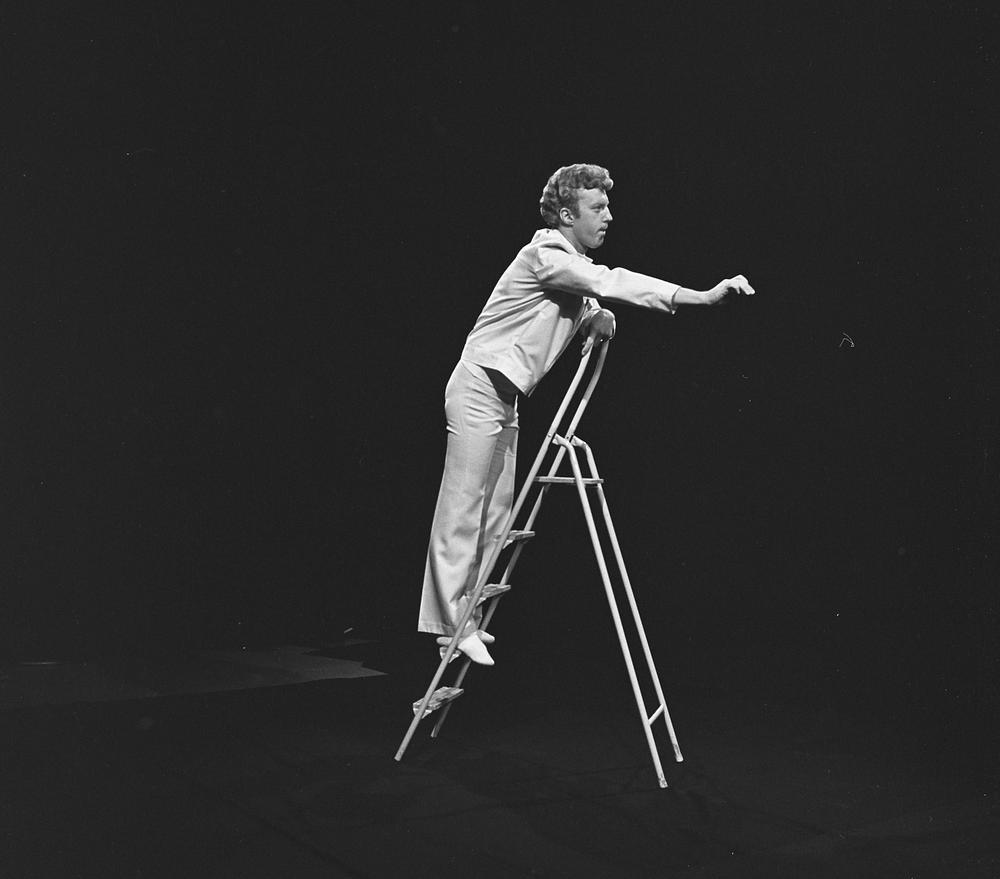
Van Duin in his first own television show Een avondje teevee met André in 1969.

In 1962, fifteen-year-old Van Duin sent in several applications to the different public broadcasters in which he described his work and ambitions.

Dear sirs,

With this, I announce to you, that I am 15 years of age and that it is my ideal to become conferencier. I therefore ask you politely, if I am able to complete an ability test for your broadcaster. My repetoir consists amongst others of: conferences, songs, imitation, mimical expression with music and such. Waiting for your answer, I spend my time,

Yours sincerely,

André van Duin

— Van Duin's application letter (English translation),

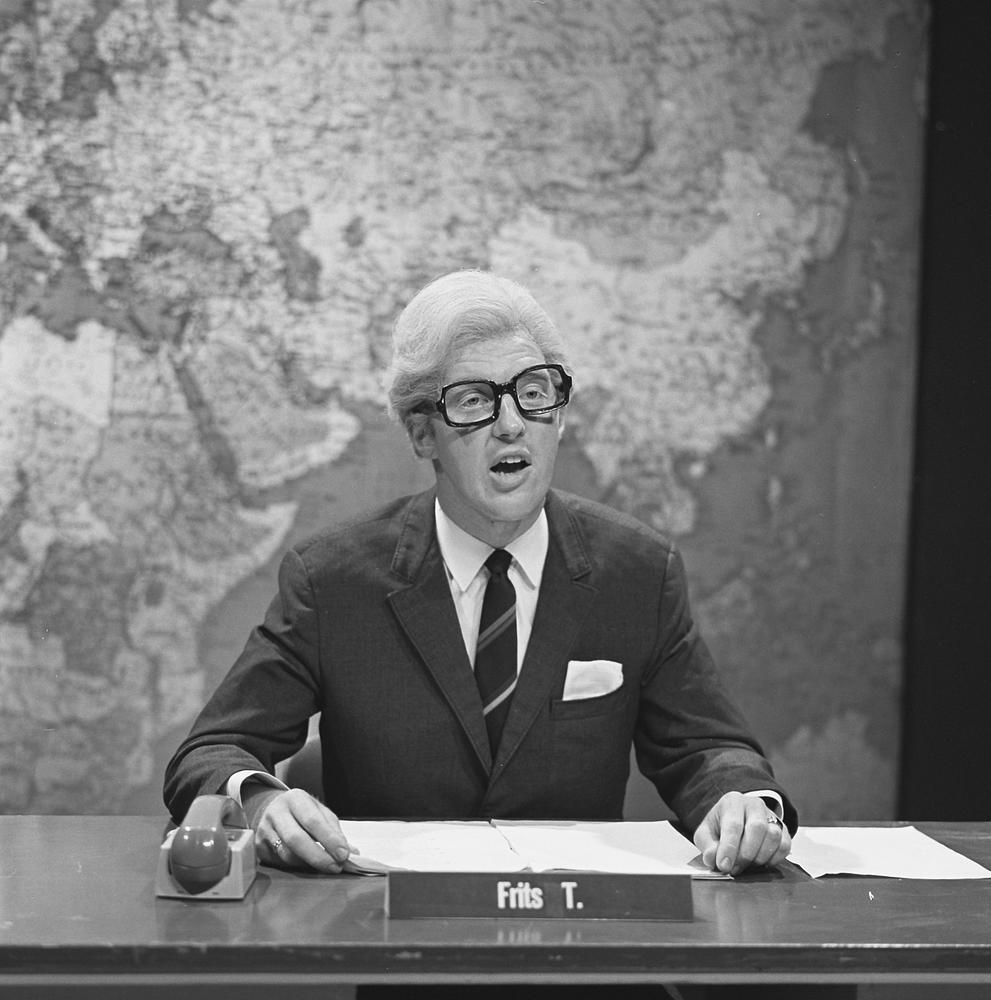
Van Duin parodying NTS news anchor Frits Thors.

KRO was one of the only two broadcasters to reply to Van Duin's letter, stating that they had been reading "his naughty little letter" with "great astonishment", adding that they highly doubted that Van Duin would be successful in his ambitions. Eventually, AVRO invited him to do a small performance on their youth radio show Minjon.

In 1964, Van Duin achieved his great breakthrough. He entered AVRO's talent contest Nieuwe oogst, which purpose it was to showcase new musical talent to the Dutch public. Van Duin entered the show as recording parodist. During the first show, he playbacked to a self-made six-minute mixed recording of American and British hit songs, his own jokes and imitations of other artists, and hysterical laughter. Van Duin finished the act with imitating a chicken dance in a circle parodying "Surfin' Bird", which had been a hit the year before.

Though Karel Prior commented that the performance was not "very original" and that Van Duin was entering a lane that was already occupied by Wim Sonneveld and Tom Manders, the performance however made a huge societal impact. Van Duin therefore eventually won the show, with 71 points, leaving a 13-point gap between himself and the runner-up.

His prize was to perform his first single "Hé Hé, ik ben André" during the popular programme Zaterdagavondshow, hosted by father and daughter Willy and Willeke Alberti.

Van Duin then became an apprentice of artists Theo Reggers and Huug Kok, who then formed the popular duo De Spelbrekers. In the latter half of the 1960s, Van Duin travelled along with the Snip en Snap Revue, where he learnt more about the revue theatre. Around the same time, Van Duin met Guus Verstraete jr., a Dutch television director. Together with Verstraete, Van Duin created his first own television show, titled Een avondje teevee met André, of which five episodes were broadcast. The show received a good critical response, with a Tubantia journalist called it "the highlight" of the Sunday evening television.

=== 1970s: Revues, Dik Voormekaar Show, chart success ===
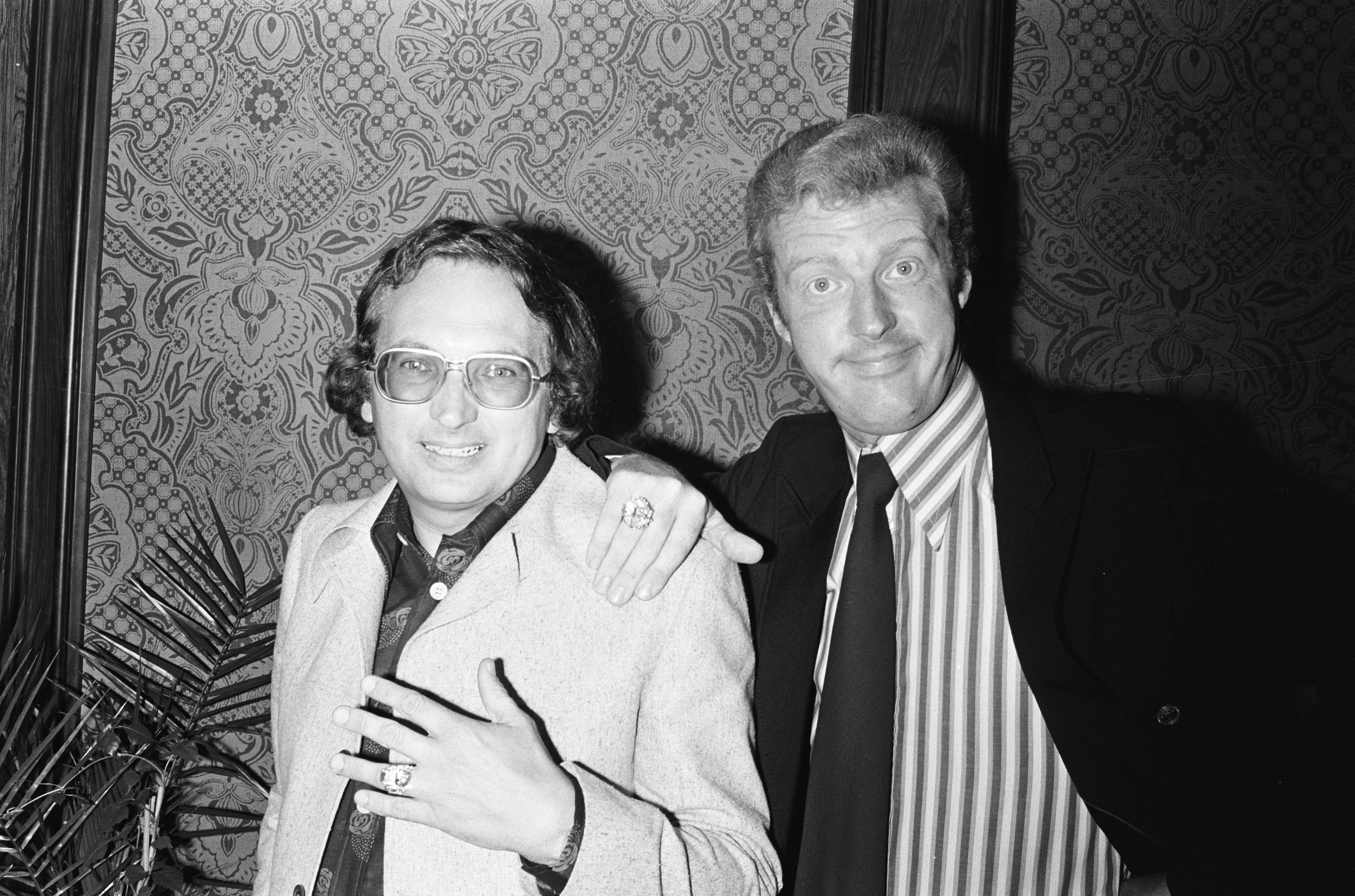
Frans van Dusschoten (left) and André van Duin collecting the Gouden Televizier-ring in 1975

==== Revue touring ====
After the good response to his first television show, theatre producer Joop van den Ende cast Van Duin for a revue production. Initially, Van Duin would play the straight man to Frans van Dusschoten, but during the try-outs, Van den Ende decided that Van Duin was better suited to play the role of the everyman.

Together with Ria Valk as the leading lady, Van Duin and Van Dusschoten toured with the revue 'n Lach in de ruimte in 1970. The revue received critical acclaim with a Nieuwsblad van het Noorden journalist stating that Van Duin could become a household name in the Dutch theatre world.

In the theatre season of 1973–1974, Van Duin and Van Dusschoten toured the Netherlands with the revue programme Dag dag heerlijke lach, this time with Corrie van Gorp as the leading lady. While popular among the Dutch public, theatre and television critics branded the show as low culture. A televised version of the show won the Gouden Televizier-ring, the most important television prize as voted by the Dutch public. At the award ceremony of the Gouden Televizier-ring, Van Duin showed that he had pasted the critics' bad reviews onto a toilet roll and read them out loud in front of the press. A recording taken of that moment was restored and broadcast during the 2017 award ceremony of the ring.

==== Dik Voormekaar Show ====
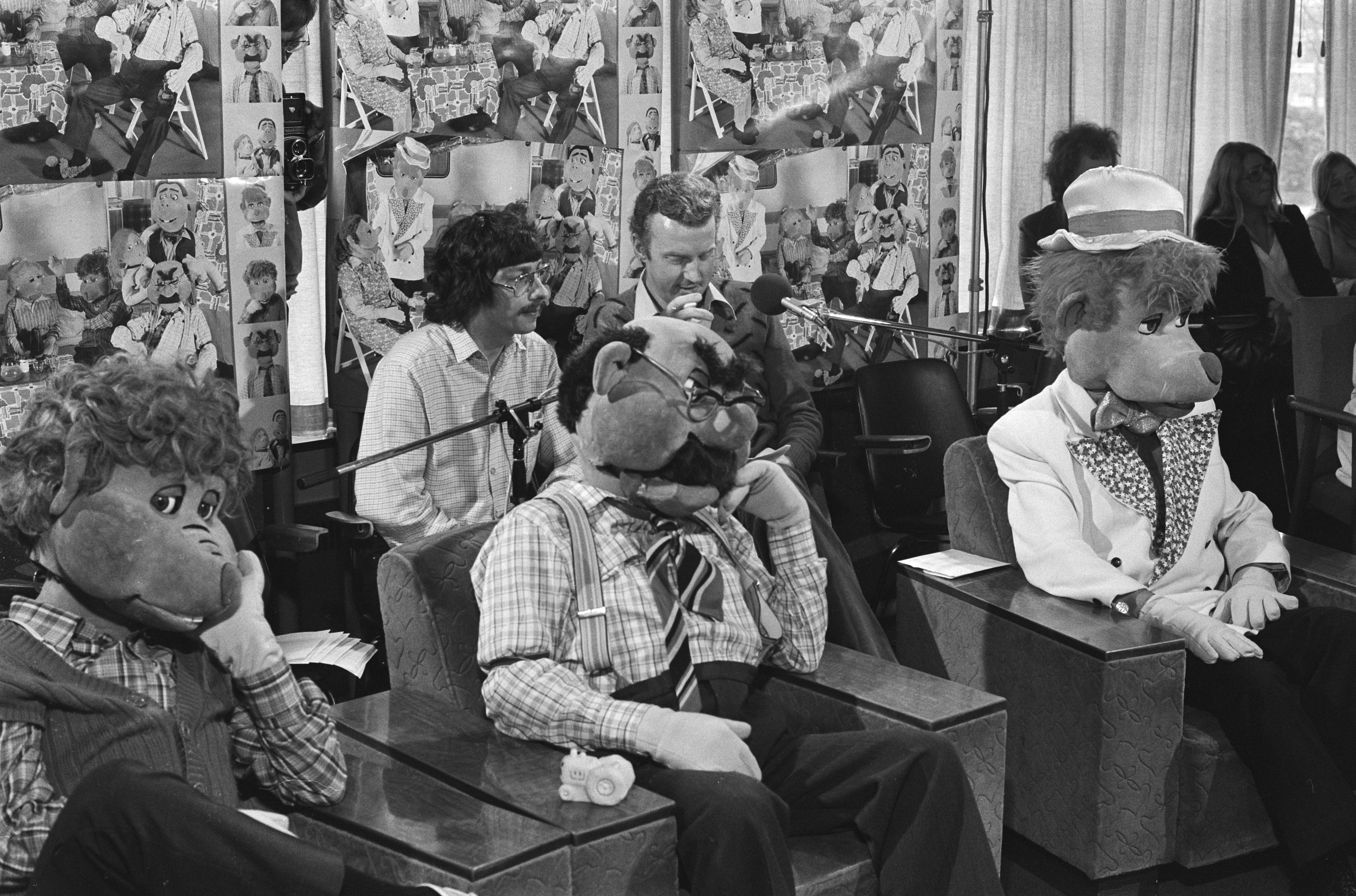
Ferry de Groot and André van Duin (right) during a television recording of Dik Voormekaar Show

In 1972, André van Duin was asked by Radio Noordzee to host a weekly comedy show, which was first titled De Abominabele Top 2000. In that show, Van Duin parodied radio commercials and the Dutch stock office, but a segment with Van Duin's first real alter ego Dik Voormekaar became the most popular part of the show. After a few shows, Van Duin also started to involve his technician, Ferry de Groot, who played the alter ego of Mr. De Groot.

After ten episodes, Van Duin and De Groot turned the show into the Dik Voormekaar Show, adding more characters to the broadcast too. However, after Van Duin and De Groot spoofed the board of Radio Noordzee, their show was taken off the air. Van Duin was fired.

In 1974, Van Duin and De Groot signed a contract to continue the show on within NCRV's radio time on Hilversum 3. Until the show's end in 1985, the Dik Voormekaar Show received high listener ratings and was one of the most popular programmes on the Dutch radio. The show was also adapted to television between 1977 and 1979, with Van Duin and De Groot voicing puppet portrayals of their alter egos. An album dedicated to the show peaked at 8 in the Dutch album charts, and singles "Nee nou wordt ie mooi" and "Tingelingeling" reached top 10 places in the Dutch charts.

==== Chart success ====
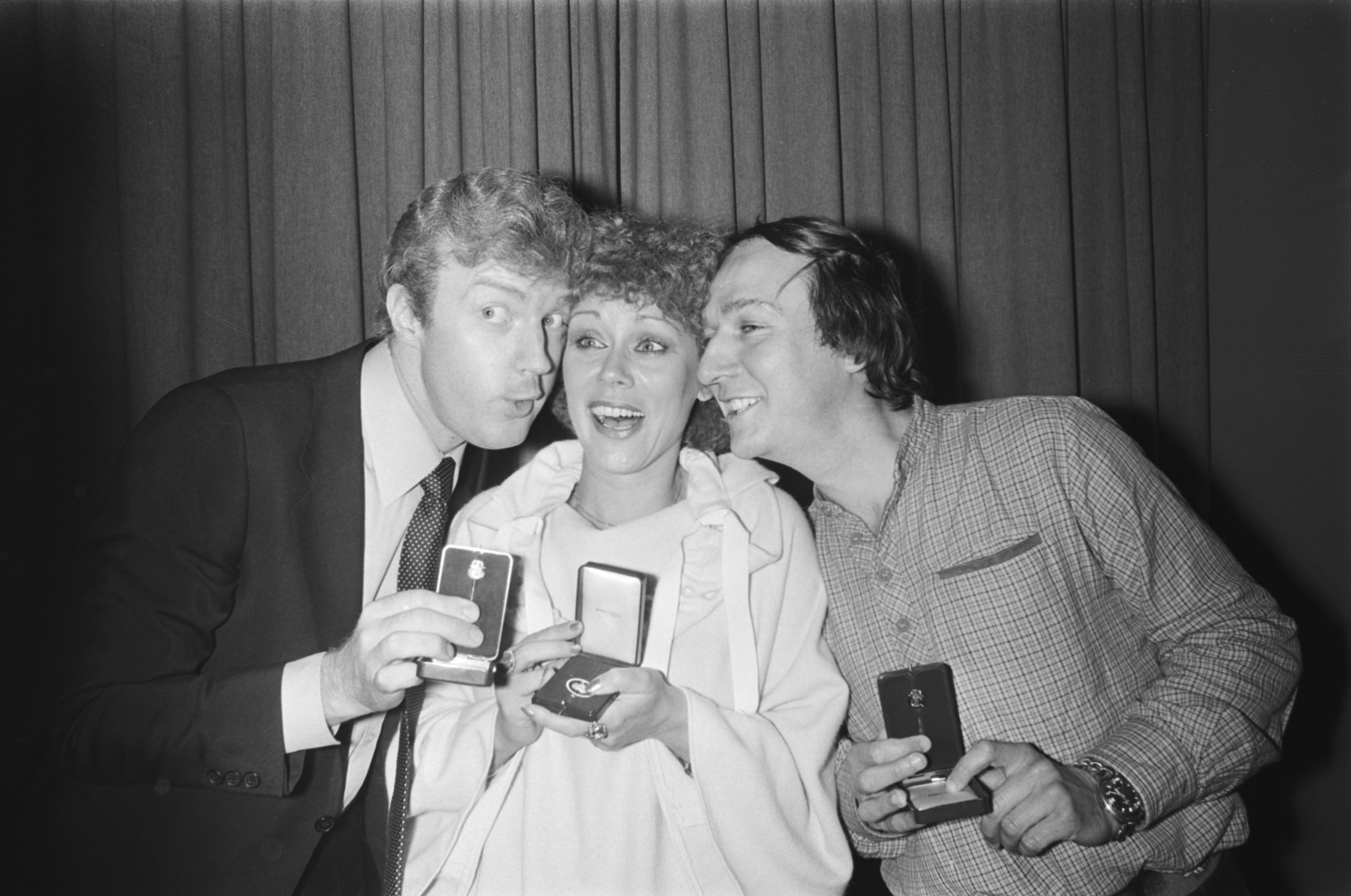
André van Duin, Connie Vandenbos and Peter Koelewijn receive a Gouden Harp music prize in 1977

In the 1970s, André van Duin frequently reached top chart positions with both comical songs and parodies of popular songs. Van Duin released his eponymous album in 1972, which reached No. 2 in the album charts. In 1974, Van Duin released "De tamme boerenzoon", which was a parody of Flemish Ivan Heylen's chart-topping single "De wilde boerndochtere". Van Duin's parody reached No. 2 in the single charts, behind the original, which held the top spot for several weeks.

However, some of Van Duin's songs became more popular than the original version, which led to both praise from music critics and irritation from Dutch artists. In 1974, Van Duin's parody of Ramses Shaffy's "We Zullen Doorgaan", titled "Doorgaan", reached the top 10 in the charts, something the original had not managed. In 1980, Willy Alberti sang an ode to the abdicating Queen Juliana of the Netherlands, which was parodied by Van Duin in an answer song, in which Van Duin imitated Prince Bernhard of Lippe-Biesterfeld.

Van Duin furthermore developed himself in the genre of carnavalskraker, a throwaway comic song with mass appeal often played at the caranaval parades in the Netherlands and Flanders. This resulted in his first chart-topping single, "Willempie", in 1976, which stirred controversy for his depiction of a retarded man. Van Duin had one more chart-topping carnavalskraker in the 1970s: "'k Heb hele grote bloemkoole", which he released as his alter ego Mr. De Bok.

André van Duin also had success with more serious music and released two albums dedicated to a more serious image: And're André in 1977 and And're André 2 in 1978.

==== Other ventures ====
In the 1970s, Van Duin also played roles in films and series on television. He debuted as an actor in Oebele in 1971. Van Duin played the lead role of Koos Overwater in Hotel de Botel, which served as the Dutch adaptation of Fawlty Towers in autumn 1976. André van Duin was the main presenter and commentator on Te land, ter zee en in de lucht from 1977 to 1979.

=== 1980s: Films and Animal Crackers ===
==== Ik ben Joep Meloen and De boezemvriend ====
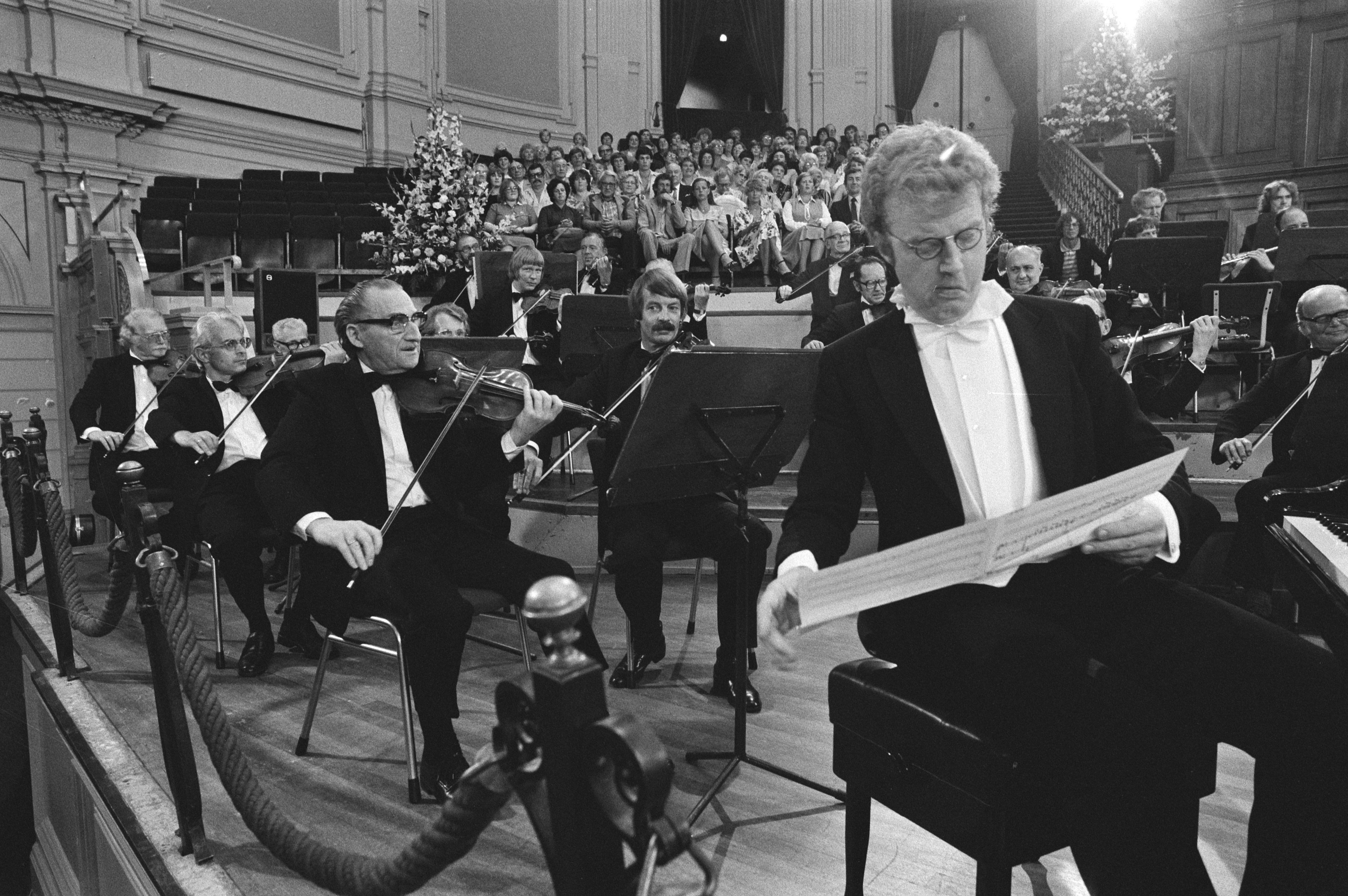
André van Duin during the recordings of Ik ben Joep Meloen in Amsterdam in 1981.

In 1981, Van Duin became the central figure of his first motion picture comedy Ik ben Joep Meloen, in which he portrayed the titular character, piano tuner Joep Meloen. The original working title of the film was Lach om je leven (English: Laugh about your life). Before the film's premiere on 15 December 1981, TROS broadcast a one-hour promotion programme, which was criticised by two members of the Tweede Kamer for excessive promotion of third party goods on the public television. The film received mixed reviews from critics. Algemeen Dagblad journalist Arno Gelder called the film a disappointment, saying that Van Duin was better in theatre. A journalist from De Volkskrant named it "a waste of talent". Leeuwarder Courant rather argued that the film was enjoyable and entertaining for those who did not mind the character of Joep Meloen. Despite mixed reviews, Ik ben Joep Meloen however became a box office success; it attracted over 700.000 viewers within three weeks of opening, and several cinemas claimed record sales.

As a result, Van Duin was cast in another film, De boezemvriend, which was a loose adaption of Nikolay Gogol's Revizor. In this film, Van Duin portrayed main character Fred van der Zee, a charlatan dentist mistaken for Napoleon's delegate. The film premiered on 8 December 1982. The film mostly received negative reviews from critics.

==== Comedy work and Animal Crackers ====
During the 1980s Van Duin stayed unchangingly popular as a comedian in the Netherlands. In the mid-1980s he became especially known for several of his alter egos, which he sometimes performed alongside Corrie van Gorp. In 1981, he presented the Flip Fluitketel Show as his alter ego Flip Fluitketel, which at its peak attracted an estimated 5.8 million viewers.

In 1986, Van Duin made short pieces of comedy while narrating zoo animals in a show he named Animal Crackers, which was subsequently entered into the Rose d'Or festival. In 1988, Animal Crackers got its own television show in collaboration with the World Wildlife Fund. In February 1988, Animal Crackers was the third-most viewed programme with a market share of 34%.

=== 1990s: Move to commercial television and departure from theatre ===
With the opening up of the Dutch broadcasting system in the 1990s, entertainers such as Van Duin received new opportunities. One of the first ventures Van Duin had on commercial television was the broadcasts of one of his revues on New Year's Eve 1990 on RT L4, which was then still a Luxembourgish company. This broadcast attracted over 2.8 million viewers, becoming the most watched programme of the day. Meanwhile, TROS broadcast an unseen revue from Van Duin a few days later which received reportedly even more viewers. However, in 1990, Van Duin had agreed to make programmes for RTL for a duration of three years, sparking rumours about his relationship to the TROS.

At RTL, Van Duin went on to present programmes as Wedden Dat and to participate as a panelist in the game show Wie ben ik? alongside Ron Brandsteder. Caroline Tensen presented the show. Van Duin ended up with the award TV star of the year 1991.

In 1993, Van Duin announced his departure from theatre. In a farewell concert in Rotterdam's Luxor Theatre, Van Duin played alongside Van Dusschoten for a last time as the latter went to retire from performing altogether. Van Duin aimed to concentrate more on television work. Shortly after, Van Duin relocated to Aruba, where he lived with his partner.

In autumn 1993, he returned to the Netherlands to record a new comedy show. From its first episode, in which Van Duin dressed up as a pizza delivery man, a song became an instant success. Already before the broadcast, a Nieuwsblad van het Noorden journalist noted that "everybody in Aalsmeer studio was singing the song in the hallways". The song, now officially dubbed as "Pizzalied (Effe Wachten)", was released early December as a single and quickly topped the Dutch charts.

In early 1995, Van Duin ended his two decades-long relationship with Wim van der Pluym due to the latter's alcohol misuse and moved back to Amsterdam. However, as Van der Pluym became increasingly ill, Van Duin flew back to Aruba to stay with him. In July 1995, Van der Pluym died at the age of 43.

=== 2000s: New Revue and Dik Voormekaar Show ===
In 2007 the André's Nieuwe Revue-tour was launched; Belgium was visited in November 2008 for five shows in Antwerp.

After 18 years with RTL, Van Duin happily returned to the TROS. In 2009 he made a new series of Dik Voormekaar Shows.

=== 2010s: Move to Omroep MAX and more serious image ===
André van Duin talking on De Wereld Draait Door about Dutch cinema and the 2018 Dutch municipal elections.

In March 2010, Van Duin released Dubbel, a 2CD-compilation made up of both serious and wacky songs including new tracks such as the mother's day-tribute "Moederdag" and a cattle-themed cover-version of Leonard Cohen's "Hallelujah".

In 2013, Van Duin resurrected Animal Crackers for two seasons. One year later, Van Duin celebrated his five decades long career by hosting a 16-episode Best Of.

In the latter half of the 2010s, André van Duin slowly started moving away from his privital comedian image. He signed a contract with Omroep MAX, one of the other Dutch broadcasters, whose target group is the 50-plus generation and became active as a singer, actor and TV host as opposed to a comedian. Van Duin released a cover album of Wim Sonneveld songs in 2016.

To EenVandaag, Van Duin said: "I've sung serious songs before and then people said: 'nice voice, you should do more with that', but then as comedian, you are rather more of stand-out. I did some songs inbetween, but I have never been a singer. But after all, I am happy that I now have the possibility. (...) I wouldn't necessarily call it a career switch, I am doing everything that I have always done, but now those really odd characters I did with berets and short pants and those nonsense, which I did for over 50 years with a lot of success and fun, but now I think 'I am becoming older, next year I'll be 70', I have to start doing things that fit my age."

In 2015, Van Duin debuted as a stage-actor in The Sunshine Boys starring alongside Kees Hulst. They toured for a year and collaborated further in Het geheime dagboek van Hendrik Groen, a drama series set in a nursing-home after the novels with the same name. Van Duin played the lead role of Evert Duiker for two seasons.

Van Duin acted as a voice-over for a BBC-style wildlife-documentary; Wild premiered in cinemas in February 2018. Two months later, Animal Crackers returned in the last-minute slot of talkshow Tijd voor MAX.

Van Duin replaced Martine Bijl as the host of Heel Holland Bakt, the Dutch version of The Great British Bake Off, when she was recovering from an SAH. Bijl said she had only wanted the programme to carry on if André van Duin were to become her replacement. When Bijl couldn't return to the show because of the complications of her illness, Van Duin became the permanent host of the show.

On 21 June 2018 Van Duin received a lifetime-achievement award at the Zilveren Nipkowschijf-ceremony. Van Duin's famous "Dik Voormekaar Show" was ranked first in De Onvergetelijke Luisterlijst, an all-time ranking of best Dutch radio shows broadcast by the Dutch public broadcaster NPO to celebrate the 100-years anniversary of the Dutch radio.

In August 2018, Van Duin hosted De Nieuwe Lekkerbek, a contest for inventive snacks. In March 2019, Van Duin co-hosted Wat een Verhaal (Amazing Stories) with Anne-Marie Jung; a series in which actors portray viewers' stories. That same year, Van Duin collaborated with his Heel Holland Bakt co-host Janny van der Heijden on the documentary series Denkend aan Holland, in which they sailed across the Netherlands by boat to learn about the country's relationship with water.

=== 2020–present: personal loss, "La bohème" and "Voor Altijd" ===
Van Duin put his activities on hold in late 2019 due to the illness of his husband. Van Duin's husband died in early 2020.

His first re-appearance on television in 2020 was during one of the last broadcasts of De Wereld Draait Door, the Netherlands' most popular talk show, which was planned to end in March 2020. There, Van Duin sang a Dutch cover of Charles Aznavour's La Bohème, to which André van Duin had penned a Dutch translation. This performance went viral in the Netherlands. Later, news portal nu.nl named it as one of the eight most striking moments in the show's history.

In an interview to Algemeen Dagblad, Van Duin said: "It was extreme. In my whole career, I have never had so much response on a television performance. I made people happy with it apparently. I got all kinds of compliments: how special, what did you sing well, we teared up on the couch. It is "The Great Dutch Cry-Off". I didn't know that many people were watching."

In 2021, Van Duin collaborated with singer-songwriter Danny Vera on "Voor Altijd", a song dedicated to Van Duin's late husband. On 20 February, he performed the song live on Mathijs gaat door. "Voor Altijd" charted at #23 at the tip side of the Dutch Singles Chart and at #20 at the tip side of Dutch Top 40.

In October 2024, he received the Gouden Televizier Oeuvre-Ring award for his entire oeuvre. He is the fifth person to receive this award since 1964. In July 2025, he was decorated Officer in the Order of the Crown (Belgium).

== Personal life ==
André van Duin is openly bisexual, and was in a relationship with Wim van der Pluym from 1974 until 1995, when Van der Pluym died. Van Duin married Martin Elferink on 23 December 2006 (Died 13 January 2020).
