= Jérôme Reehuis =

Dutch actor and poet (1939–2013)

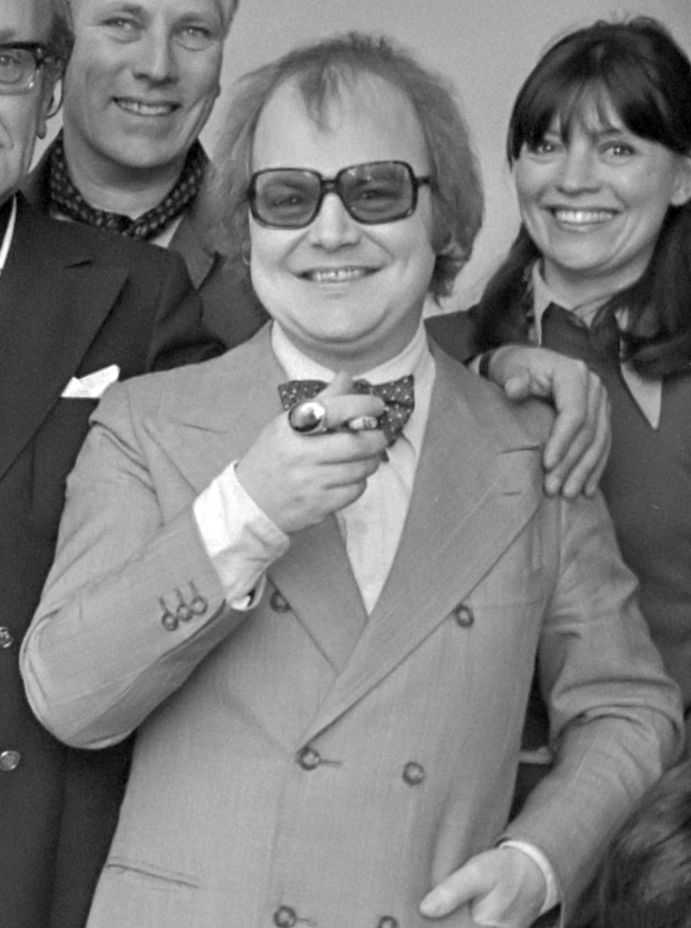
- Jérôme Reehuis in 1977
- Born: Hieronymus Gerhardus Maria Reehuis; 7 July 1939; Apeldoorn, Netherlands
- Died: 17 May 2013 (aged 73); Amsterdam, Netherlands
- Occupations: Actor, Writer

Hieronymus Gerhard Maria "Jérôme" Reehuis (7 July 1939 – 17 May 2013) was a Dutch actor and poet.

Reehuis was born in Apeldoorn. He became known for his distinctive, warm voice and exemplary diction. He became known to the general public for his role in the film The Bossom Friend.

Reehuis died in Amsterdam, aged 73.

== Filmography ==
Year	Title	Role	Notes
1966	Thyestes		
1973	Naked Over the Fence	Lode Zaayer	
1974	Alicia	Notaris	
1975	Mens erger je niet		
1977	Rubens	Hertog Vincent van Gonzagua	
1981	Hoge hakken, echte liefde	Huib	
1981	Ik ben Joep Meloen	Muziekuitgever	
1982	De boezemvriend	Napoleon	
1983	De mannetjesmaker	Grafredenaar	
1985	Thomas en Senior op het spoor van Brute Berend	Mulder	
1987	Nitwits	Filmregisseur	
1989	Rituelen	Roozenboom	
1996	De Zeemeerman	Professor Swezick	(final film role)
