= Olga Zuiderhoek =

Dutch actress

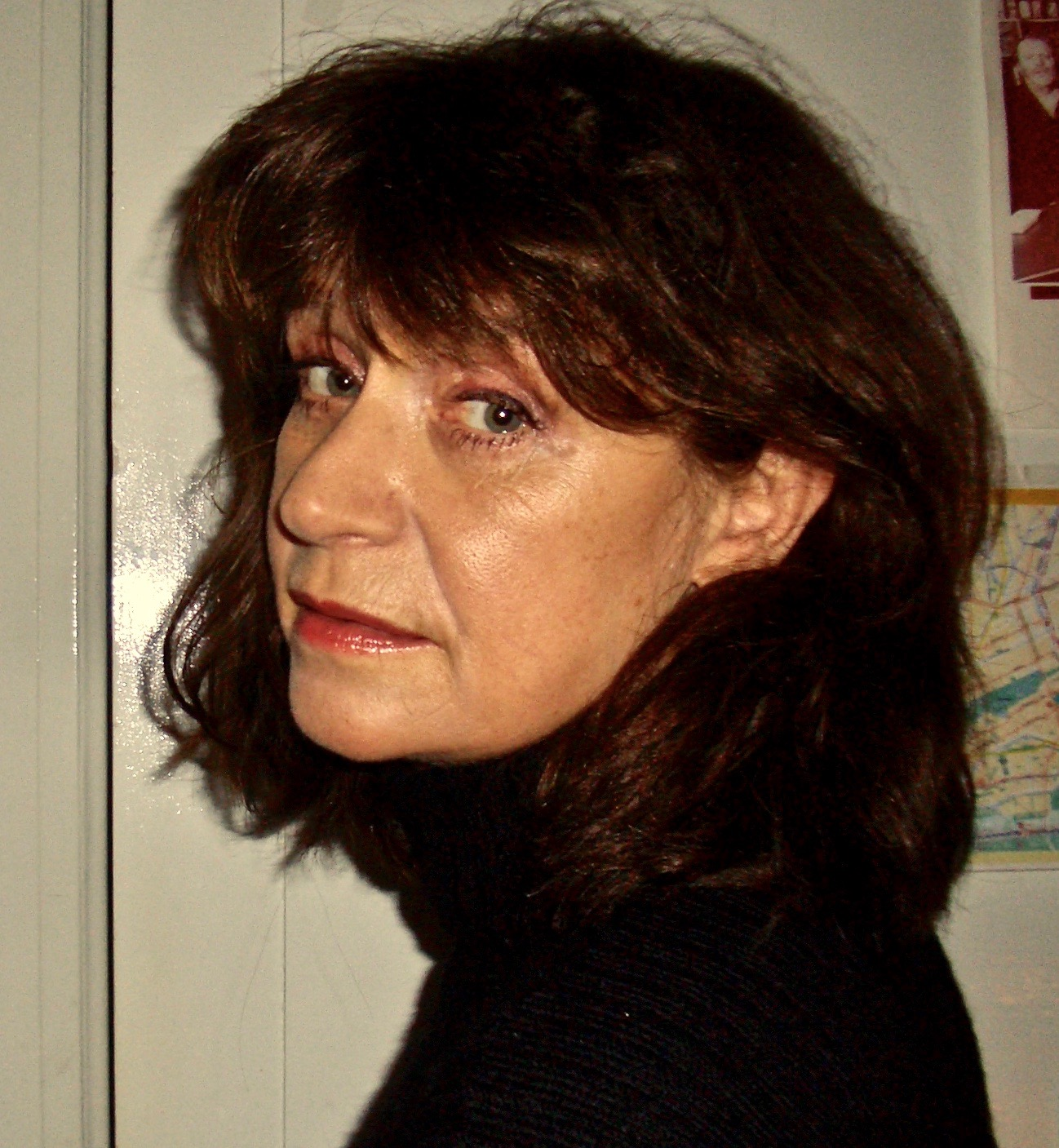
- Zuiderhoek (2004)
- Born: 16 September 1946 (age 80); Assen
- Occupation: Actor

Olga Zuiderhoek (born 16 September 1946 in Assen) is a Dutch actress. She graduated in 1970 from the Amsterdam Theater School. After having been associated with the cooperative association Het Werkteater for many years, she worked for the theater companies De Mexicaanse Hond and Orkater and played mainly in new plays by homegrown, sometimes written for her.

== Theater ==
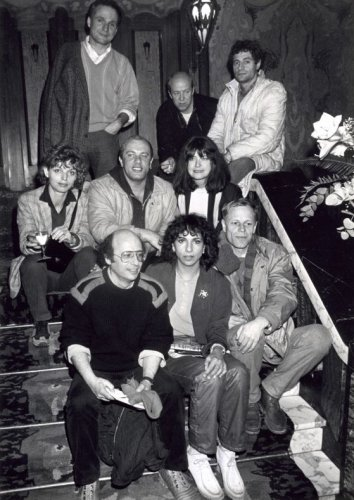
Zuiderhoek (middle row right), Werkteater, 1982

Zuiderhoek was a member of the innovative theater group Het Werkteater from 1974 to 1982. After that she played with theater group Orkater in the plays Parking (1987) and Een goed hoofd (1991) and further with De Mexicaanse Hond in the play Kaatje drowned (1993). In her later acting career she worked, among others, with the Dutch writers Kees van Kooten, Adriaan van Dis, Jan Donkers, Paul Haenen and Frank Houtappels, who sometimes also wrote a piece for her. In Theater Bellevue, Zuiderhoek has been playing the Christmas performance Peace on nature together with Kees Prins for years. In 1986 Olga won 'the golden heart of Rotterdam' with Danny and Roberta and in 2007 'the Audience Award' for the performance Who is afraid of Virginia Woolf directed by Gerardjan Rijnders. In 2014 and 2015 she played Queen Wilhelmina in the musical Soldaat van Oranje.

== Awards and nominations ==
- In 1986 she was nominated for a Gouden Kalf for her role as mother Duif, in Abel by Alex van Warmerdam.
- In 1986 she won 'Het Gouden Hart van Rotterdam' theater prize for her role as Roberta in the play Danny en Roberta.
- In 1995 she was nominated for her role as Tine Tak in the television series The lonely war of Koos Tak by director Theo van Gogh.
- In 2007 the play Who's afraid of Virginia Woolf? Directed by Gerardjan Rijnders with Olga Zuiderhoek and Porgy Franssen won the Theater Audience Award.
- In 2012 Zuiderhoek won a Golden Calf in the category "best supporting actress" for her role in "Süskind".
- In 2014 she won at De TV-Beelden in the category "best supporting actor (m / f)" for her role in "Penoza III".

== Personal life ==
Zuiderhoek lives in Amsterdam and was together for 28 years with jazz musician Willem Breuker, who died in 2010.

== Filmography ==
- Turkish Delight (1973)
- Naked Over the Fence (1973)
- Camping (1978)
- Recording (1979)
- High Heels, Real Love (1981)
- Rigor Mortis (1981)
- The Taste of Water (1982)
- A Balmy Summer Evening (1982)
- And / Or (1985)
- Abel (1986)
- Speaking of Luck (1987)
- Theo and Thea and the Unmasking of the Wicker Cheese Empire (1989)
- Tropical Years (1989)
- A Strange Love (1990)
- The Northerners (1992)
- The Johnsons 1992
- Movie! (1995)
- The Dress (1996)
- Minoes (2001)
- Yes Sister, No Sister (2002)
- HannaHannah (2007)
- Tiramisu (2008)
- Strong Stories (2010)
- Furious (2011)
- Süskind (2011)
- After the Tone (2013)
- Penoza: The Final Chapter (2019)
- April, May and June (2019)

== Television series ==
- Open & Naked (1974)
- For better or worse (1991–1998)
- We're back home (1990–1994)
- Seth & Fiona (1994)
- The Lonely War of Koos Tak (1995)
- Baantjer (2000)
- Au (1997)
- Loenatik (1998)
- Otje (1998)
- Meiden van De Wit (2003)
- Keyzer & De Boer Lawyers (2005)
- Evelien (2006)
- Song of Life (2011)
- Penoza (2010–2017) –
- The man with the hammer (2013)
- Lord & Master (2014)
- Trollie (2015) – Mimi
- Oldenheim's 12 (2017)
- The secret diary of Hendrik Groen (2017)

== Documentary and book ==
In 2012, two years after the death of her husband Willem Breuker, the documentary Het Nieuwe Huis van Olga Zuiderhoek was made. In 2014 she wrote with journalist Ingrid Harms the cookbook Ongezouten Zuiderhoek about cooking without salt. Zuiderhoek gained experience with this because Breuker was prescribed a low salt diet. The book contains illustrations by Peter van Straaten.
