= Filmpje! =

- Directed by: Paul Ruven
- Starring: Paul de Leeuw; Rijk de Gooyer; Olga Zuiderhoek
- Edited by: Sander Vos
- Distributed by: PolyGram Filmed Entertainment
- Release date: 11 December 1995
- Running time: 90 minutes
- Country: Netherlands
- Language: Dutch
- Box office: $4.4 million (Netherlands)

Filmpje! (pronounced [ˈfɪlmpjə]; "Little Film!") is a 1995 Dutch comedy film directed by Paul Ruven. It stars Dutch TV presenter and comedian Paul de Leeuw as two of his characters, Bob de Rooy and his wife Annie de Rooy, who both featured in many of his TV sketches. Just like De Leeuw's TV shows the film is full of controversial comedy about taboo subjects. It was the most popular Dutch film of the year.

== Plot ==
Bob de Rooy is an arrogant, egotistical man who divorces his well-meaning, but very naïve wife Annie, because she's unable to provide him the right amount of sex in their married life. After the divorce is settled, Bob goes to the red light district in Amsterdam to catch up with what he has been missing for all those years. There he starts an affair with a prostitute who turns out to be the daughter of gangster boss Don Gorgonzola. When the criminal boss finds out that his daughter has an affair with Bob, who arrogantly makes fun of him on the phone and hangs up before he does, Bob and his newfound love have to flee to Curaçao. Meanwhile, Annie falls in love three times, first with a notorious criminal who is later shot by one of Gorgonzola's henchmen, then with a man who dies of cancer and later one of Gorgonzola's henchmen who exploits Annie's innocence to let her smuggle drugs to Curaçao. There Annie and Bob meet again...

== Cast ==
- Paul de Leeuw ... Bob de Rooy / Annie de Rooy
- Rijk de Gooyer ... Don Gorgonzola (as Rijk de Gooijer)
- Olga Zuiderhoek ... Carmen
- Tom Jansen ... Brie
- Arjan Ederveen ... Charl Diepenhoef
- Porgy Franssen ... Rocky Fort
- Roos Ouwehand ... Marie Louise de Rooy
- Coen van Vlijmen ... Albert de Rooy
- Kees Groenteman ... Marcel de Rooy
- IJf Blokker ... Piet Buks
- Wil van der Meer ... Gekke Gerrit (as Will van der Meer)
- Peer Mascini ... Joop Rooster
- Willeke Alberti ... Toos Rooster
- Pleuni Touw ... Mevrouw Lozig
- Bram van der Vlugt ... Dokter Lozig
- Stanley Burleson ... Ambulancebroeder
