= Marjolein Sligte =

Dutch actress (1954–2026)

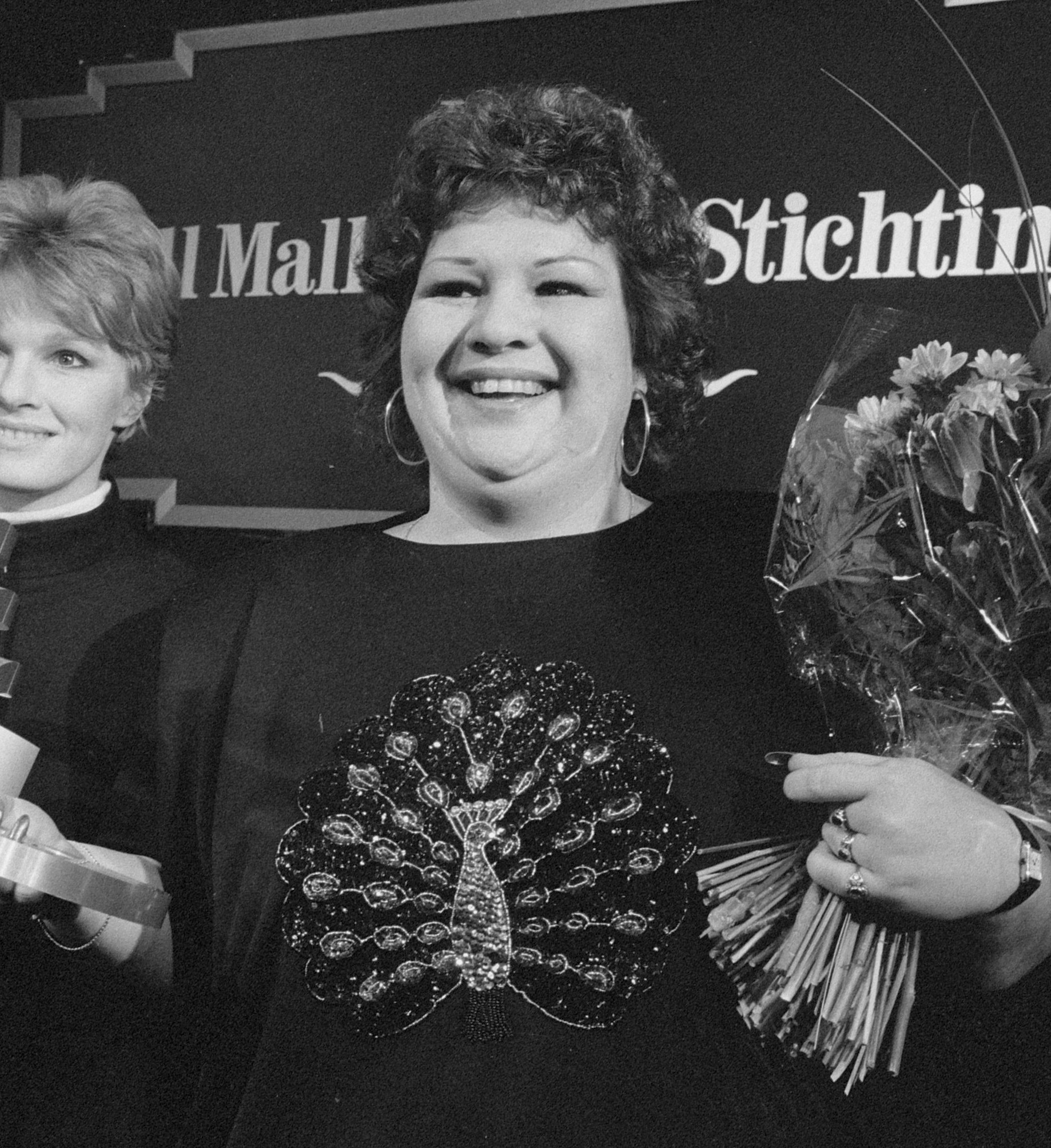
- Sligte in 1987
- Born: 15 October 1954; Amsterdam, Netherlands
- Died: 6 August 2026 (aged 71); Almere, Netherlands
- Occupation: Actress

Marjolein Sligte (15 October 1954 – 6 August 2026) was a Dutch actress.

She was well-known for frequently appearing alongside Piet Bambergen.

Sligte died in Almere on 6 August 2026, at the age of 71.

== Filmography ==
- De Boezemvriend (1982)
- A Month Later (1987)
- Honneponnetje (1988)
- Medisch Centrum West (1988)
- De Zeemeerman (1996)
- The Discovery of Heaven (film) (2001)
