= De Zeemeerman =

- Theatrical release poster
- Directed by: Frank Herrebout
- Written by: Frank Herrebout; Rob Houwer
- Produced by: Rob Houwer
- Cinematography: Philip Hering
- Music by: Ed Starink
- Production company: Verenigde Nederlandsche Filmcompagnie
- Distributed by: United International Pictures
- Release date: 10 October 1996
- Running time: 78 minutes
- Country: Netherlands
- Language: Dutch
- Budget: ƒ5.5 million

De Zeemeerman is a 1996 Dutch comedy film directed by Frank Herrebout. The movie revolves around a young man who has a hard time getting girls because he permanently smells of fish. The cure, offered by a mad professor, turns him into a male mermaid, or mer-man ('zeemeerman' in Dutch).

The film received negative reviews from critics and was a box office bomb. According to 134,000 users of website moviemeter.nl, De Zeemeerman is the worst Dutch movie of all time, scoring #3 in the list of worst movies overall (with National Lampoon's Pledge This! in the number one spot). Ed Starink composed the main theme.

== Cast ==
- Daniël Boissevain as Tony Pellicano
- Gonny Gaakeer as Julie / Natasja
- Angelique de Bruijne as Suzy
- Frans van Deursen as Gregor
- Huub Stapel as Timo Babel
- Manuëla Kemp as Christa
- Peter Faber as Simon
- Serge-Henri Valcke as Pedro
- Jerome Reehuis as Professor Swezick
- Joke Bruijs as Mevrouw Romijn
- Katja Schuurman as Bea
- Gert-Jan Dröge as Maitre d'Hotel
- Marjolein Sligte as Wilma
- Romijn Conen as Wim Evers

== Release ==
The film was released on DVD by Indies Home Entertainment on 8 November 2005.
