= The Dress (1996 film) =

1996 film by Alex van Warmerdam

- Theatrical release poster
- Directed by: Alex van Warmerdam
- Written by: Alex van Warmerdam
- Produced by: Marc van Warmerdam; Ton Schippers; Alex van Warmerdam
- Starring: Henri Garcin; Ariane Schluter; Alex van Warmerdam; Ricky Koole; Rijk de Gooyer; Elisabeth Hoijtink; Olga Zuiderhoek; Eric van der Donk
- Cinematography: Marc Felperlaan
- Edited by: Rene Wiegmans
- Music by: Alex van Warmerdam
- Production company: Graniet Film
- Distributed by: Meteor Film Distribution
- Release date: 21 March 1996
- Running time: 103 minutes
- Country: Netherlands
- Language: Dutch

The Dress (Dutch: De jurk) is a 1996 Dutch black comedy drama film written and directed by Alex van Warmerdam.

== Plot ==
During a meeting in which clothing director Loohman selects a blue floral pattern for a new summer dress, consultant Van Tilt is fired on the spot. The dress goes on sale and is purchased by an elderly couple. However, the woman becomes depressed and suffers a stroke. During a thunderstorm, the dress blows off her clothesline and ends up in the hands of a gardener, who gives it to the cleaning lady. She wears the dress while on the train, where conductor De Smet meets her.

He secretly follows her to the studio of an artist with whom she is having an affair. De Smet crawls into bed with her and seduces her in, and flees when the artist returns. De Smet meets her again the next day and takes her to the bedroom of a house, which turns out not to be his. The owner comes home and holds the two at gunpoint, leading to a chase on foot. The maid manages to escape the conductor by getting on an empty bus, resulting in the bus driver later trying to assault her.

The next day, she donates the dress to a charity drive for Africa in a fit of rage. The dress is altered and put back on display in a clothing store, where it is bought by a teenage girl. De Smet runs into her on the train as well, and he later breaks into her apartment and forces her to spend the night with him. She escapes from him the next morning. In the park, her bag, containing the dress, is stolen by a homeless woman, who then puts the dress on herself.

In the winter, however, she dies, and Van Tilt, who has since become homeless and had been trying to care for her, tears off a piece of the dress and uses it as a scarf and handkerchief. When he finally manages to get a kiss from a park prostitute for 100 guilders, he throws away the last piece of the dress (the rest having been burned at the crematorium), which is then shredded by an electric lawnmower.

== Cast ==
- Henri Garcin as Van Tilt
- Ingeborg Elzevier as Mrs. Van Tilt
- Khaldoun Elmecky as Cremer
- Margo Dames as Stewardess
- Alex van Warmerdam as De Smet
- Frans Vorstman as Loohman
- Peter Blok as De Vos
- Jacob Derwig as Koerier
- Rudolf Lucieer as De Vet
- Maike Meijer as Eva
- Carol van Herwijnen as Shopassistent
- Rijk de Gooyer as Martin
- Elizabeth Hoytink as Stella
- Jack Wouterse as Gardener
- Ariane Schluter as Cleaning woman
- Kees Hulst as Overbuurman
- Ricky Koole as Chantalle

== Reception ==
=== Critical response ===
On review aggregator Rotten Tomatoes, the film holds an approval rating of 80% based on 10 reviews, with an average rating of 6.90/10.

David Rooney of Variety magazine said that "Dutch director Alex van Warmerdam, spins an eventful narrative out of the story of an inanimate object in his third feature, The Dress. Charting the effect the titular garment has on a string of men and women, the director does a mechanically impressive job of sustaining what feels like an exercise in narrative construction".

== Accolades ==
Accolades received by The Flying Liftboy
Year	Award	Category	Recipient(s)	Result	Ref.
1996	Netherlands Film Festival	Golden Calf for Best Feature Film	Marc van Warmerdam; Ton Schippers; Alex van Warmerdam	Nominated	
1996	Netherlands Film Festival	Golden Calf for Best Actress	Ricky Koole	Nominated	
1996	Netherlands Film Festival	Golden Calf for Best Director	Alex van Warmerdam	Nominated	

== See also ==
- List of films featuring home invasions
