= Scratches in the Table =

- Directed by: Ineke Houtman
- Written by: Rob Arends (screenplay), Guus Kuijer (novel)
- Music by: Henny Vrienten
- Release date: 15 October 1998
- Running time: 80 minutes
- Country: Netherlands
- Language: Dutch

Scratches in the Table (Dutch: Madelief, krassen in het tafelblad) is a 1998 Dutch film directed by Ineke Houtman. It was the Netherlands' official Best Foreign Language Film submission at the 72nd Academy Awards, but did not manage to receive a nomination.

== Cast ==
- Madelief Verelst as Madelief
- Giulia Fleury as Madelief als peuter/Madelief as a toddler
- Rijk de Gooyer as Opa/Grandpa
- Peter Blok as Opa als jonge man/Grandpa as a young Man
- Margo Dames as Moeder/Mother
- Kitty Courbois as Oma/Grandma
- Veerle Dobbelaere as Oma als jonge vrouw/ Grandma as a young woman
- Frederik Brom as Mischa (as Freek Brom)
- Tjerk Risselada as Vader van Mischa/Mischa's father
- Pim Lambeau as Tante Ant/Auntie Ant
- Adrian Brine as Man van tante Ant/The husband of Auntie Ant
- Ineke Veenhoven as Buurvrouw/The neighbor (woman)
- Rob van de Meeberg as Buurman/The neighbor (man)
- Jaap Stobbe as Jaap
- Ingeborg Elzevier as Vrouw van Jaap/wife of Jaap

== See also ==
- List of Dutch submissions for the Academy Award for Best Foreign Language Film
- List of submissions to the 72nd Academy Awards for Best Foreign Language Film
