= Ingeborg Elzevier =

Dutch actress (1936–2025)

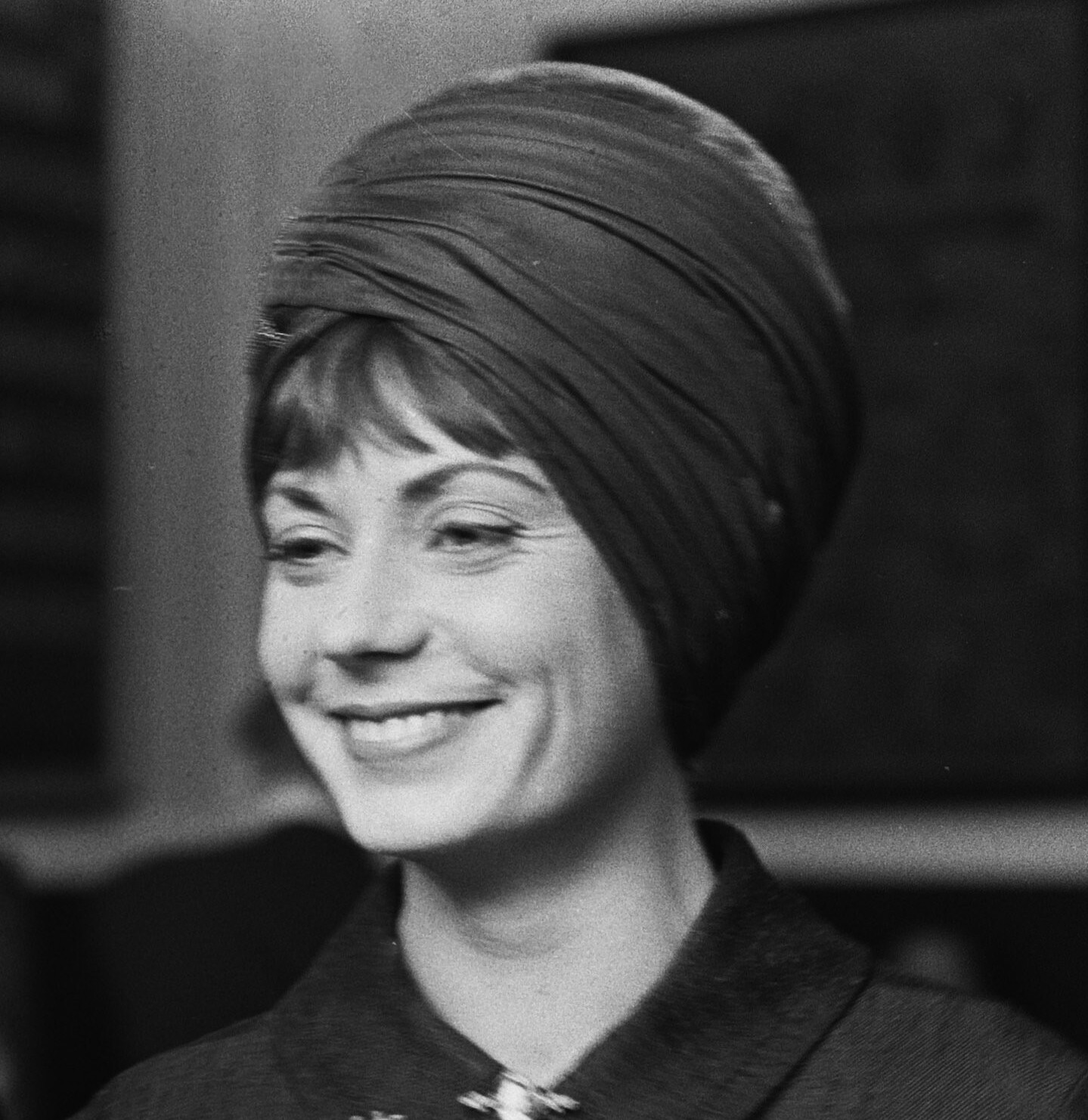
- Born: February 20, 1936; Amsterdam, Netherlands
- Died: August 14, 2025 (aged 89); Amsterdam, Netherlands
- Occupation: Actress

Ingeborg Elzevier (20 February 1936 – 14 August 2025) was a Dutch actress.

== Early life and career ==
Elzevier grew up in Amsterdam and went to drama school there. In 1958 she graduated together with Femke Boersma and Louis Bongers.

After graduating, Elzevier immediately got an appointment at theater group Theater in Arnhem. She made her debut in Orpheus Descending by Tennessee Williams with the role of Dolly Hamma. In 2018 she celebrated her 60th stage anniversary.

She also appeared in such films as Scratches in the Table (1998), The Dress (1996), Grimm (2003) and Rocco & Sjuul (2023).

== Personal life and death ==
In 1963 she married actor Lou Steenbergen. The couple had a son. She later divorced him. Elzevier married and divorced three times in her life.

Elzevier died in Amsterdam on 14 August 2025, at the age of 89.
