= The Burglar (1972 film) =

- Directed by: Frans Weisz
- Written by: Chiem van Houweninge (screenplay); Rob du Mee (screenplay); A. Defresne (novel)
- Produced by: Rob du Mee
- Starring: Rijk de Gooyer; Jon Bluming
- Cinematography: Ferenc Kálmán-Gáll
- Edited by: Ton Ruys
- Music by: Ruud Bos
- Distributed by: City Filmverhuur
- Release date: 7 September 1972
- Running time: 105 minutes
- Country: Netherlands
- Language: Dutch

The Burglar (Dutch: De inbreker) is a 1972 Dutch thriller directed by Frans Weisz.

== Plot ==
Glimmie, a burglar and safe-cracker, is going through a rough patch in his criminal career. During his latest break-in, he encounters an empty safe, leaving Glimmie and his partner De Bonk on the verge of despair. But then they get a job that could net them three thousand guilders: they have to track down the young girl Fanny and return her to her stepfather, Van Borsen, a wealthy banker. According to Van Borsen, Fanny is a drug addict who has run away from home. Involving the police would generate negative publicity, which could have serious consequences for his high-ranking position.

Inspector Van Hol, who has been assigned to keep an eye on Glimmie, advises the duo against working for Van Borsen, but Glimmie and De Bonk do not listen to him. It soon becomes clear however, just as Van Hol predicted, that the assignment is a set-up on the part of the client. Glimmie believes that Van Borsen is abusing Fanny and will kill her once she is tracked down, after which Glimmie and De Bonk will be accused of the murder. Meanwhile, he receives a visit from Van Huiberk, from the German embassy, who demands to know what he discussed with Van Borsen. The next day, the hitman is found dead, but Inspector Van Hol believes Glimmie had nothing to do with it.

Not long after, Glimmie and De Bonk find Fanny in a strip club. With some reluctance, she is taken to Glimmie’s mother’s brothel, where their friend Miep also works. She admits to De Bonk that she was raped, blackmailed, and strangled by her stepfather, but Fanny fails to grasp the gravity of the situation, and that same day she runs away. She is met by a man who has been stalking Glimmie for some time, who stabs her to death with Glimmie’s stiletto and then commits suicide by running onto a highway. Glimmie realizes that all the evidence points to him and tries to pin the blame on De Bonk, but this escalates into a fight that lands Glimmie in the hospital. De Bonk stays behind with Glimmie’s mother, with whom he begins an affair and eventually marries.

In court, Van Borsen accuses Glimmie of kidnapping and murdering Fanny. Instead of telling the truth, Glimmie goes along with Van Borsen’s claims but twists them in such a way that he is acquitted. Afterward, he tries to prove his innocence with Miep’s help, but Miep is too afraid and sends her 16-year-old cousin Slofje to him instead. After a difficult start, they form a good and close-knit team that steals documents from Van Borsen. They are chased by one of Van Borsen’s men until he is handcuffed by Van Hol. In the background, an international financial scam is unfolding. Glimmie figures it out and breaks into Van Borsen’s house one last time to prove his innocence.

After finding the right papers, he is caught by Van Borsen. Before Van Borsen can shoot him however, Glimmie throws a stiletto at his throat, causing him to bleed to death. Glimmie’s name is finally cleared, and he decides to continue taking care of Slofje.

== Cast ==
- Rijk de Gooyer as Willem 'Glimmie' Burg
- Jennifer Willems as Angelique 'Slofje'
- Jon Bluming as De Bonk
- Willeke van Ammelrooy as Fanny van Borsen
- Bob de Lange as Van Borsen
- Sylvia de Leur as Miep
- Frits Lambrechts as Inspector Van Hol 'de Stoer'
- Han Bentz van den Berg as President of the Court
- Anny de Lange as Glimmie's mother
- Roelant Radier as Van Borsen's spy
- Dolf Lasscher as Van Huiberk
- Hans Croiset as Judge
- Ronny Bierman as Prostitute
- Ingeborg Jonassen as Leni Scheepers
- Henk Votel as Jopie
- Allard van der Scheer as Lawyer

== Production ==
For the film adaptation of August Defresne’s crime novel, producer Rob du Mée chose the intellectual Frans Weisz to direct. Weisz was unhappy with du Mée’s commercial decision to cast Rijk de Gooyer in the lead role and would have preferred to see Charles Aznavour play the part. Later, Weisz said: “I’ll be honest with you: before *The Burglar*, I never thought I’d ever make a movie with Rijk de Gooyer. I always found him an unpleasant man. I don’t drink and I don’t smoke, and he was my exact opposite." Contrary to expectations, the collaboration nevertheless went well. Filming took place in May and June 1972.

== Reception ==
The film was positively received by the press. De Gooyer received widespread critical acclaim, and it was believed that The Burglar had launched him into stardom. Weisz and Jennifer Willems' performances also garnered praise from critics. Weisz himself expressed his admiration for De Gooyer: “It was really the first time a Dutch actor had made the film.” A single negative review came from the NRC Handelsblad, which wrote: “The portrayal was inaccurate. The fact is that every criminal—the thief, the burglar, the man who practices throwing knives—is an enemy of society, and certainly not someone who has integrated into it in a charming, old-Amsterdam way."
