= Ed Starink =

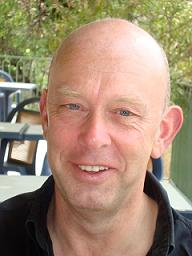
- Ed Starink, 2012

Background information
- Born: 17 December 1952 (age 73)
- Origin: Apeldoorn, Netherlands
- Genres: Instrumental; electronic
- Occupations: Composer, musician, record producer
- Instruments: Synthesizer, keyboards
- Years active: c. 1965–present
- Labels: MCR Records; Arcade Music Company; CNR Music; Star Inc.
- Website: www.starink-world.net

Ed Starink (born Eduward A. J. Starink on 17 December 1952 in Apeldoorn), also known as Star Inc., is a Dutch composer, arranger, session musician and record producer. He is best known for his albums in which he cover versioned different hits, film and television themes, which were released under the Arcade record label and his Star Inc. Music label.

== Biography ==
Eduward A.J. Starink was born on 17 December 1952 in Apeldoorn, Netherlands. Since his childhood he was fascinated by music and taught himself to play many musical instruments like the piano, flute and guitar. Later he would study classical piano and composition. During his studies, he worked for several major recording studios in the Netherlands. As a keyboardist he was engaged to accompany the Beach Boys on the Hammond organ, and also to play keyboards for David Bowie. In 1965, he played guitar, bass and piano in small bands and in 1970 he formed the group Gamma, composed the music and played the synthesizer EMS Synthi AKS in it. Starink graduated in 1976, later giving his own Music Academy lectures. In 1981 released their debut album, Cristallin influenced primarily by Maurice Ravel and in 1983 he bought the Fairlight CMI-2 and composed the "Big Brother Suite", inspired by George Orwell's Nineteen Eighty-Four book. In that same year, he released his next album Syndrome.

In 1989, Starink co-operated with Arcade Records, and released an estimated 30 albums of which his best known series is Synthesizer Greatest, which succeeded mainly in the European market. His first album of this series was released in that same year and peaked at No. 22 in the UK Albums Chart. On 7 October 1989 it released its sequel Synthesizer Greatest Volume 2. His 1993 album Synthesizer Greatest Gold reached at No. 29. Japanese electronic composer Isao Tomita greatly influenced his technical approach to synthesizers, among his other influences are Mozart, Bach, Scriabin and Wendy Carlos. In 1991, Ed remixed his older analog recordings in his new digital studio for the "Retrospection" album. Also he composed the main theme for the Dutch comedy film "De Zeemeerman" (1996). By 1998, Starink released "The Surround Experience" albums with many of his previous works remixed in Dolby Surround and moved with their studio to the Southern France.

From 2002 to 2003 he began to compose and research for a Universe Symphony project, in 2004 he changed his Dolby Surround for a Dolby Digital 5.1. that he would use to record the first songs of his project. In 2005 he used software synthesizers and other plugins for Logic Pro 7. By 2006 he finished pre-recording Of a total of 500 songs and began refining these basic recordings into fully orchestrated pieces, later that year he would compose a total of 1,200. In 2008 he abandoned his usual hardware equipment to focus entirely on a computerized studio. In May 2012 he released the recordings of the first part of their project entitled The Piano Works. The following year he began with the arrangements and orchestration of the second part of his project titled The Orchestral Works.

== Discography ==
Title	Album details	Chart positions					
Title	Album details	NL	AUT	GER	NOR	SWI	UK
Cristallin	Released: 1981; Label: MCR; Format: LP, CD	—	—	—	—	—	—
Syndrome	Released: 1983; Label: Proto Records; Format: LP	—	—	—	—	—	—
Synsation	Released: 1983; Label: Arcade Trent; Format: LP, MC	34	—	—	—	—	—
Dansen Moet Je Doen	Released: 1984; Label: Arcade; Format: LP	—	—	—	—	—	—
Synthesizer Greatest	Released: 1989; Label: Arcade; Format: LP, CD, MC	1	14	8	—	4	22
Synthesizer Greatest Volume 2	Released: 7 October 1989; Label: Arcade; Format: LP, CD, MC	1	—	10	—	4	—
Synthesizer Greatest Volume 3	Released: 1990; Label: Arcade; Format: LP, CD, MC	4	—	—	—	10	—
Synthesizer Greatest Volume 4	Released: 1990; Label: Arcade; Format: LP, CD, MC	71	—	—	—	—	—
Synthesizer Greatest Volume 5	Released: 1990; Label: Arcade; Format: LP, CD, MC	13	—	—	—	19	—
Synthesizer Greatest The Classical Masterpieces	Released: 1991; Label: Arcade; Format: LP, CD, MC	30	—	—	—	—	—
Feelings 20 Golden Panflute Melodies	Released: 1991; Label: Arcade; Format: LP, CD, MC	40	—	—	—	—	—
Synthesizer Greatest The Classical Masterpieces 2	Released: 1991; Label: Arcade; Format: LP, CD, MC	85	—	—	—	—	—
Retrospection	Released: 1991; Label: Star Inc. Music; Format: LP, CD	—	—	—	—	—	—
Synthesizer Greatest Volume 6	Released: 1992; Label: Arcade; Format: LP, CD, MC	38	—	—	—	—	—
Synthesizer Greatest Volume 7	Released: 1993; Label: Arcade; Format: LP, CD, MC	—	—	—	—	—	—
The Tao Of Love - Romantic Panflute	Released: 1993; Label: Star Inc. Music; Format: CD	—	—	—	—	—	—
Synthesizer Greatest Gold	Released: 1993; Label: Arcade; Format: CD, MC	—	—	—	—	—	29
Best Of Synthesizer	Released: 1995; Label: Arcade; Format: CD, MC	—	—	—	21	—	—
The Greatest Love Album 19 Panflute Love Ballads	Released: 1995; Label: Arcade; Format: CD	—	—	—	—	—	—
Panflute Emotions	Released: 1996	—	—	—	26	—	—
Modern Synthesizer Hits	Released: 1996; Label: Star Inc. Music; Format: CD	—	—	—	—	—	—
Seasons	Released: 1998; Label: The Surround Experience; Format: CD	—	—	—	—	—	—
3D Synth	Released: 1998; Label: The Surround Experience; Format: CD	—	—	—	—	—	—
