= Seth & Fiona =

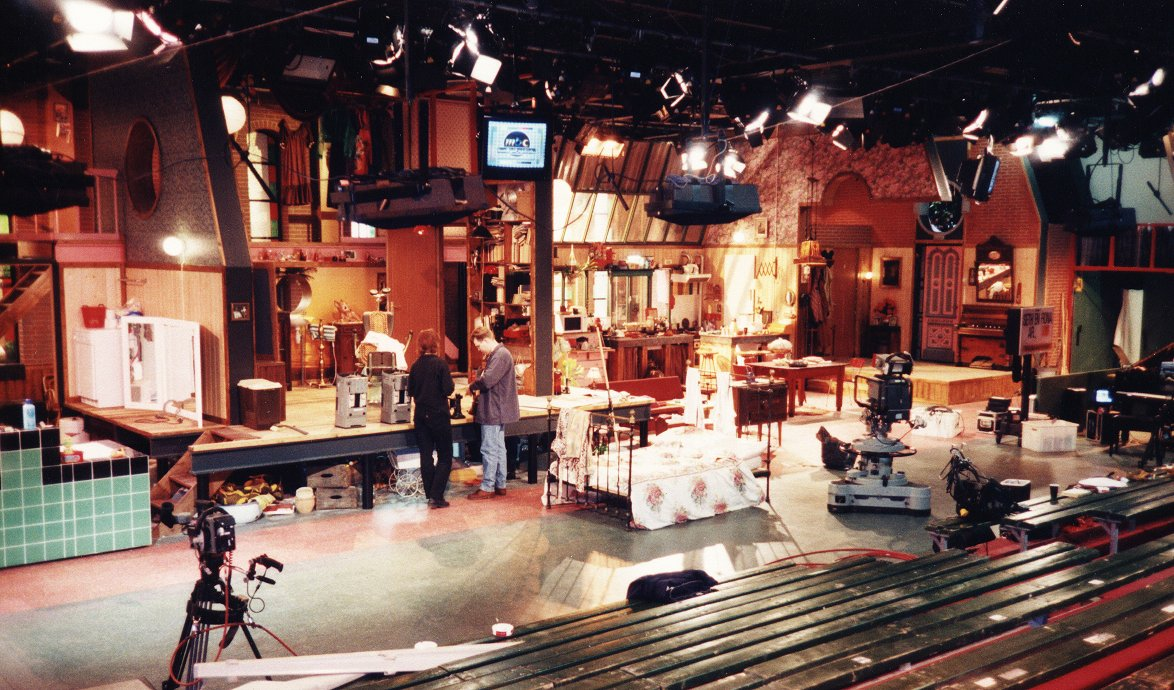
- Set for Seth & Fiona
- Composer: Cor Bakker (orchestrator)
- Country of origin: Netherlands
- No. of seasons: 1

Production
- Producer: Ineke Lommerse (producer)
- Editor: Rien Post

Original release
- Release: 1994

"Seth & Fiona" is a 1994 Dutch TV series.

== Cast ==
- Paul de Leeuw as Seth
- Olga Zuiderhoek as Fiona (11 episodes, 1994)
- Kees Prins as Freek
- Joep Onderdelinden as Roel
- Cor Bakker
- Kees Hulst as Jos
