= Peter A. G. M. De Smet =

Dutch ethnopharmacologist (born 1952)

Petrus Adrianus Godfried Maria (Peter) De Smet
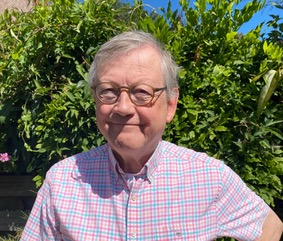
- Born: 1952 (age 73–74); Breda, Netherlands
- Occupations: Pharmacist, Clinical Pharmacologist, Researcher, Lyricist
- Known for: Dutch drug database, Ethnopharmacology research
- Awards: Knight in the Order of the Dutch Lion (2019), Honorary Medal Royal Dutch Pharmaceutical Association (2018), Ig Nobel prize for art history (2022)

Peter A.G.M. De Smet is a retired drug information pharmacist and clinical pharmacologist, emeritus professor of pharmaceutical patient care, and lyricist. He is still active as an ethnopharmacological and ethnomedical researcher.

== Drug therapy and pharmaceutical care (1979-present) ==
In the 1980s, De Smet was the chief designer of the Dutch drug database, which is still essential in Dutch healthcare. His professional publications have primarily focused on medication safety, medication incidents, drug adherence, pharmaceutical care, and drug substitution.

== Phytotherapy, ethnopharmacology, and ethnomedicine (1980-present) ==
In 1985, De Smet published an ethnopharmacological PhD thesis on intoxicating enemas and snuffs in the Americas. He published the chapter on intoxicating enemas among the pre-Columbian Maya together with Nicholas Hellmuth as a separate article in 1986.

His phytotherapeutic publications have focused on the clinical pharmacology and safety of herbal medicines and plant-derived drugs. He has also published articles on the legislation of herbal medicines, herbal pharmacokinetics, herbal pharmacoepidemiology, and herbal pharmacoeconomics.

De Smet served three times as guest curator in an ethnological museum and each time wrote the catalogue for the exhibition. He is currently working on a major 4P-Project (Patients Practitioners Practices Plants) that will provide global coverage of the material cultures of ethnomedicine and ethnopharmacology.

He located archaeological material of the peyote cactus in the Witte Museum in San Antonio, USA. Radiocarbon dating showed that the material was 5700 years old and chemical analysis demonstrated that the hallucinogenic alkaloid mescaline was still present.

De Smet co-founded the International Society for Ethnopharmacology in 1990 and participated in the Project Group for International Classification of Traditional Medicine (ICTM) of the World Health Organization (WHO). The latter project resulted in a special chapter on traditional medicine (TM) in the International Classification of Diseases (ICD 11).

== Honors & awards ==
- Knight in the Order of the Dutch Lion (2019)
- Honorary Medal Royal Dutch Pharmaceutical Association (2018)
- Ig Nobel prize for art history (2022) for the 1986 article on intoxicating Maya enemas
- Winner of the First National Lyrics Writing Competition with the Dutch song text Tegen beter weten in (Against the odds) (1995), which led to the music CD Allemaal mensen (All of them human) in 1996.
