= Rijk de Gooyer =

Dutch actor (1925–2011)

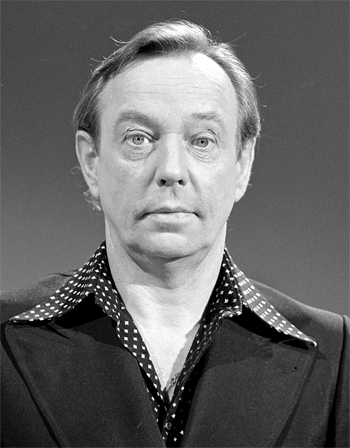
- Rijk de Gooyer in 1975
- Born: 17 December 1925; Utrecht, Netherlands
- Died: 2 November 2011 (aged 85); Amsterdam, Netherlands
- Other names: Ryk De Gooijer; Rijk de Gooijer; Ryk de Gooyer
- Occupations: Film and television actor, writer, comedian and singer
- Years active: 1955–2009

Rijk de Gooyer (17 December 1925 – 2 November 2011) was a Dutch Golden Calf-winning actor, writer, comedian and singer. From the 1950s until the early 1970s, he became well known in The Netherlands as part of a comic duo with John Kraaijkamp, Sr. In the United States best known for having small roles in films such as Nosferatu: Phantom der Nacht, Soldaat van Oranje, A Time to Die and The Wilby Conspiracy.

== Biography ==
De Gooyer was raised in a baker's family, born as one half of a fraternal twin. In World War II he worked as an interpreter. Initially for the American 101st Airborne, later on for the British Field Security. From 1959 till 1961 de Gooyer studied at an actors school of the UFA in Berlin. During these years, he supposedly worked for the CIA as an informant.

In the 1950s, he started a comic duo with Johnny Kraaijkamp. Thanks to their performances on TV, the duo became extremely popular. In the Johnny & Rijk shows, De Gooyer always played the part of the feeder, with Kraaijkamp providing the laughs. They split up in the 1970s, when De Gooyer focused more on his film career.

He played in films such as Soldaat van Oranje, De Inbreker and Madelief, krassen in het tafelblad. In 1982 he won the Golden Calf for Best Actor for all his works, according to him he could have won it a year earlier but because he wasn't there it went to Rutger Hauer. In 1995 he threw his Golden Calf for Hoogste Tijd out on the street after the ceremony. De Gooyer was videotaped while he threw the award out of the window because he was on the Dutch hidden-camera show Taxi (the Dutch version of Taxicab Confessions). His (current) last Golden Calf, for Madelief, Krassen in het Tafelblad was also thrown out on the street this time by Maarten Spanjer (who hosted Taxi). De Gooyer could be seen in various Dutch commercials, for companies such as Reaal, KPN and Paturain, and for the soda brand Sisi.

De Gooyer was the lead in In voor- en tegenspoed, the Dutch version of Johnny Speight's sitcom franchise (known in the UK as Till Death Us Do Part among other names and in the U.S. as All in the Family). De Gooyer played Fred Schuit (literally Fred Barge), the Dutch equivalent of Alf Garnett or Archie Bunker. He won a Golden Film in 1997 for the role.

== Partial filmography ==
- Het Wonderlijke leven van Willem Parel (1955) – Pianist
- Kleren Maken de Man (1957) – Peter
- Brainwashed (1960) – Berger's Secretary (uncredited)
- Rififi in Amsterdam (1962) – De Bijenkorf
- De blanke slavin (1969) – Charles Dubois
- The Burglar (1972) – Willem 'Glimmie' Burg
- Geen paniek (1973) – Rijk
- Naked Over the Fence (1973) – Rick Lemming
- The Wilby Conspiracy (1975) – Van Heerden
- Zwaarmoedige verhalen voor bij de centrale verwarming (1975) – Postbode (segment "Een Winkelier Keert Niet Weerom")
- Rufus (1975) – Rufus
- Soldaat van Oranje (1977) – Gestapo-man Breitner
- De Mantel der Liefde (1978) – Cor
- Nosferatu: Phantom der Nacht (1979) – Town official
- Grijpstra & De Gier (1979) – Henk Grijpstra
- The Lucky Star (1980) – 1st Gestapo Officer
- Het verboden bacchanaal (1981) – Kerrie-Kees van Heesteren
- Een vlucht regenwulpen (1981) – Bovenmeester
- Rigor mortis (1981) – Walter de Beer
- Twee vorstinnen en een vorst (1981) – Laernoes
- Hoge hakken, echte liefde (1981) – Semijns Roggeveen / Arie Snoek
- Het 30 April-gevoel (1981) – Himself
- Sabine (1982) – Nick
- A Time to Die (1982) – SS Officer
- De zwarte ruiter (1983) – Rinus IJzerman
- Vroeger kon je lachen (1983) – Koos
- An Bloem (1983) – Dik
- Army Brats (1984) – Pete Stewart
- Ciske de Rat (1984) – Rechercheur Muyskens
- De prooi (1985) – Bob Jaspers
- Teufels Großmutter (1986, TV series) – Hans Binnenbruck
- In de schaduw van de overwinning (1986) – Vos
- Mama is boos! (1986) – Pete Stewart
- Op hoop van zegen (1986) – Clemens Bos
- De ratelrat (1987) – Adjudant Grijpstra
- Leedvermaak (1989) – Zwart
- Evenings (1989) – Vader
- Last Call (1995) – Willem 'Uli' Bouwmeester
- Filmpje! (1995) – Don Gorgonzola
- The Dress (1996) – Martin
- Scratches in the Table (1998) – Opa
- De bal (1999) – Burgemeester Karlow
- Qui vive (2001) – Zwart
- Happy End (2009) – Zwart (final film role)
