= Rinus Ferdinandusse =

Dutch writer and journalist (1931–2022)

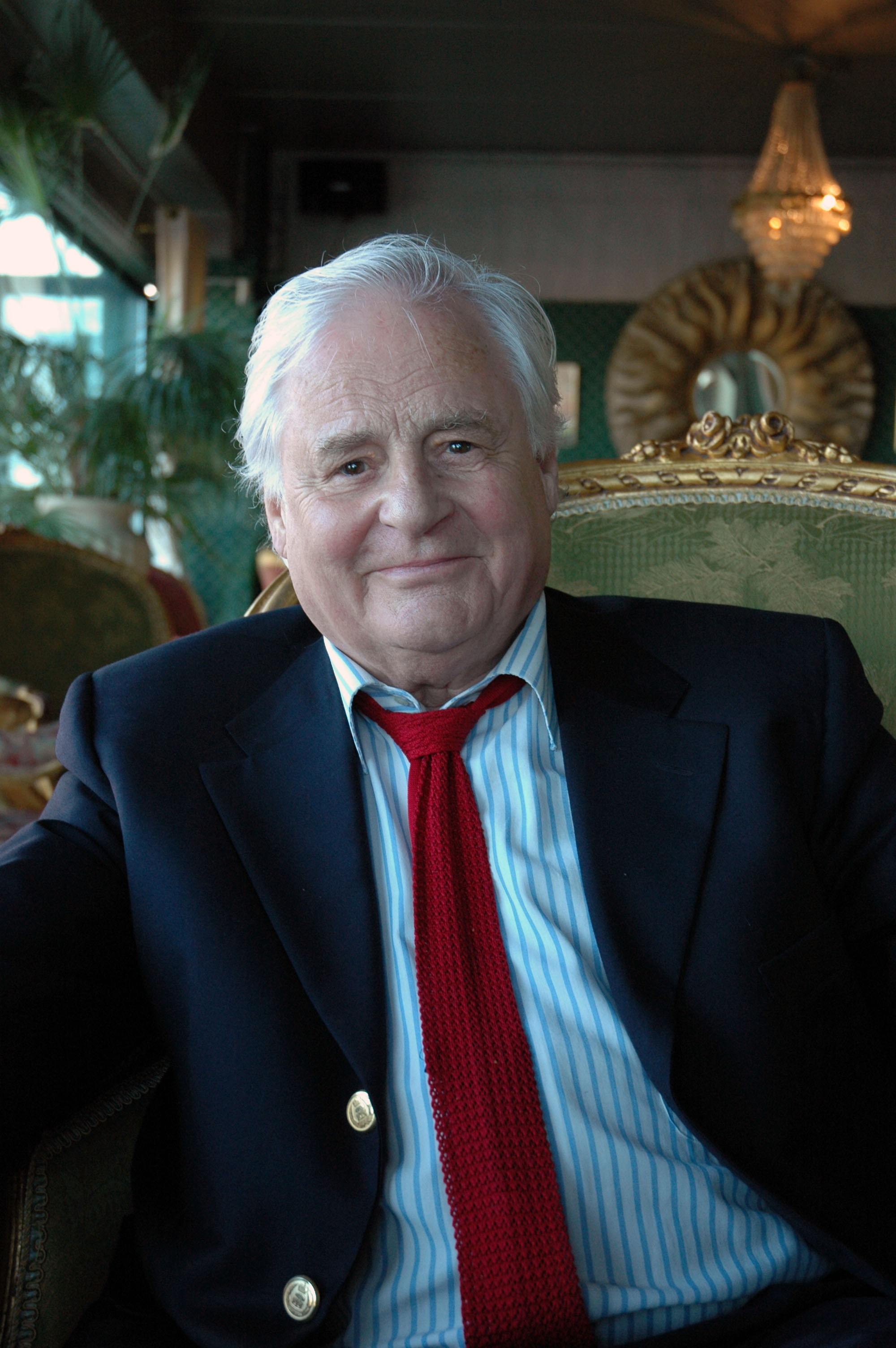
Rinus Ferdinandusse

Rinus Ferdinandusse (28 November 1931 – 23 July 2022) was a Dutch writer and journalist.
