= Hendrik Groen =

Dutch writer and author

- Born: 1954 (age 70–71); Netherlands
- Citizenship: Dutch
- Occupations: Writer; Author

Hendrik Groen is the pseudonym of Peter de Smet (born 1954), a Dutch writer. He is the author of the 2014 book Pogingen iets van het leven te maken: Het geheime dagboek van Hendrik Groen, 83¼ jaar (The Secret Diary of Hendrik Groen, 83¼ Years Old), and its 2016 sequel Zolang er Leven is: Het nieuwe geheime dagboek van Hendrik Groen, 85 jaar. Both books won the Audience Award for the Dutch Book.

== Pseudonym ==
For years, it was unknown who was hiding behind the pseudonym, which caused a lot of speculation, with names ranging from Sylvia Witteman to Arnon Grunberg. In 2016 the Dutch newspapers De Volkskrant and NRC Handelsblad published the identity of Groen as 62-year-old Peter de Smet.

== Career ==
In 2014, Groen published the book Pogingen iets van het leven te maken: Het geheime dagboek van Hendrik Groen, 83¼ jaar, which was very successful, selling its foreign rights to over 35 countries, receiving the NS Public Prize 2016, and being adapted to both a stage play and a television series in 2017. The play was directed by Gijs de Lange and had Beau Schneider in the role of Hendrik Groen. Its sequel, Zolang er Leven is: Het nieuwe geheime dagboek van Hendrik Groen, 85 jaar, also became a bestseller after its publication in 2016; in total, his diaries have sold over half a million copies in the Netherlands and Flanders. Hendrik Groen has been described as "Netherlands' cuddly elderly man" and as "the most beloved senior citizen of the Netherlands".
