= Corrie van Gorp =

Dutch actress and singer (1942–2020)

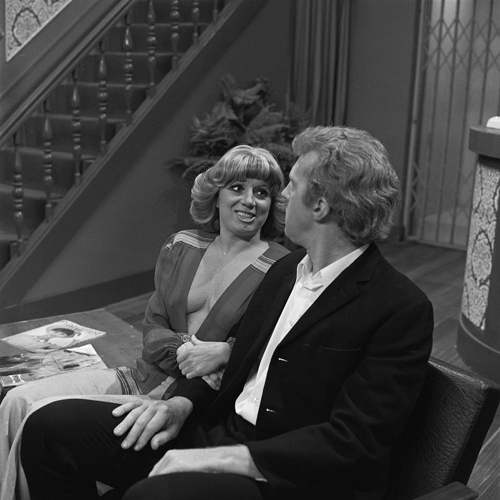
- Van Gorp (left) and André van Duin in 1976
- Born: Cornelia Elizabeth van Gorp; 30 June 1942; Rotterdam, Netherlands
- Died: 22 November 2020 (aged 78); Rotterdam, Netherlands
- Occupations: Actress; Singer

Corrie van Gorp (30 June 1942 – 22 November 2020) was a Dutch actress and singer.

== Filmography ==
- Pretfilm (1976)
- Hotel de Botel (1976)
- André's kerstshow (1978)
- De Flip Fluitketel show (1980–1981)
- Het beste van André (1981)
- Ik ben Joep Meloen (1981)
- Boem-Boem (1982)
- André's Comedy Parade (1982)
- De Poppenkraam (1985)
- De Dik Voormekaar show (2009)
- De Wereld Draait Door (2010)

== Discography ==
- Wim Sonneveld Met Willem Nijholt En Corrie van Gorp (1971)
- Wim Sonneveld Met Willem Nijholt En Corrie Van Gorp II (1974)
- Corrie Van Gorp (1978)
