= Los Lonely Boys discography =

This is the discography for American rock music ensemble Los Lonely Boys.

== Albums ==
=== Studio albums ===
Title	Album details	Peak chart positions				Certifications (sales threshold)
Title	Album details	US	US Rock	US Heat	US Indie	Certifications (sales threshold)
Los Lonely Boys	Released: June 27, 1997; Label: self-released	—	—	—	—	
Teenage Blues	Released: 1998; Label: self-released	—	—	—	—	
Los Lonely Boys	Released: August 12, 2003; Label: Or Music	9	—	1	4	RIAA: 2× Platinum
Sacred	Released: July 18, 2006; Label: Epic	2	1	—	—	
Forgiven	Released: July 1, 2008; Label: Epic	26	13	—	—	
Rockpango	Released: March 29, 2011; Label: Playing in Traffic, Lonely Tone	70	19	—	14	
Revelation	Released: January 21, 2014; Label: Playing in Traffic, Lonely Tone	120	42	—	28	
"—" denotes releases that did not chart

=== Live albums ===
Title	Album details	Peak positions
Title	Album details	US
Live at the Fillmore	Released: February 22, 2005; Label: Epic	69
Live at Blue Cat Blues	Released: February 14, 2006; Label: Blue Cat Blues	—
Keep On Giving: Acoustic Live!	Released: 2010; Label: Playing In Traffic/Lonely Tone	—
"—" denotes releases that did not chart

=== Holiday albums ===
Title	Album details	Peak positions
Title	Album details	US Holiday
Christmas Spirit	Released: October 14, 2008; Label: Epic	40

=== Compilation albums ===
Title	Album details
Playlist: The Very Best of Los Lonely Boys	Released: June 30, 2009; Label: Epic

== Extended plays ==
Title	EP details	Peak chart positions	
Title	EP details	US	US Indie
1969	Released: October 13, 2009; Label: Playing in Traffic, Lonely Tone	124	15

== Singles ==
Year	Single	Peak chart positions							Certifications (sales threshold)	Album
Year	Single	US	US AC	US Adult	US Country	US Pop	AUS	NZ	Certifications (sales threshold)	Album
2003	"Real Emotions"	—	—	—	—	—	—	—		Los Lonely Boys
2004	"Heaven"	16	1	2	46	11	87	26	RIAA: Gold; RMNZ: Platinum	Los Lonely Boys
2004	"More Than Love"	—	31	15	—	—	—	—		Los Lonely Boys
2005	"Diamonds"	—	28	26	—	—	—	—		Sacred
2008	"Staying with Me"	—	—	—	—	—	—	—		Forgiven
2011	"Fly Away"	—	—	—	—	—	—	—		Rockpango
2011	"16 Monkeys"	—	—	—	—	—	—	—		Rockpango
"—" denotes releases that did not chart

== Music videos ==
Year	Video	Director
2004	"Heaven"	Rosalyn Rosen
2004	"More Than Love"	Rosalyn Rosen
2006	"Diamonds"	Rosalyn Rosen

== DVDs ==
- Texican Style (2004) (Platinum)
- Los Lonely Boys: Live at the Filmore (2004)
- Cottonfields and Crossroads (2007)

== Other contributions ==
- Eklektikos Live (2005) - "Velvet Sky"
- Instant Karma: The Amnesty International Campaign to Save Darfur (2007, Warner Bros.) - "Whatever Gets You thru the Night"
