= Theo van de Sande =

Dutch cinematographer (born 1947)

- Born: 10 May 1947 (age 79); Tilburg, North Brabant, Netherlands
- Education: Netherlands Filmacademy
- Years active: 1960–present

Theodorus Amandus Maria van de Sande (born 10 May 1947) is a Dutch cinematographer.

He won Golden Calf for Best Cinematography in 1982 and 1987.

He has been a member of the American Society of Cinematographers since 1991.

== Filmography ==
=== Film ===
Year	Title	Director	Notes
1969	Drop-Out	Wim Verstappen	With Jan de Bont and Frans Bromet
1973	Vaarwel	Guido Pieters	
1974	Dakota	Wim Verstappen	With Jan de Bont
1976	Alle dagen feest	Ate de Jong; Otto Jongerius	
1977	The Debut	Nouchka van Brakel	
1977	The Hyena's Sun	Ridha Behi	
1979	Mijn vriend	Fons Rademakers	
1979	Kasper in de onderwereld	Jef van der Heyden	
1980	Verdronken Land	Chris Brouwer; Gerard Reteig	
1980	Whitey	Robbe De Hert	With Walther Vanden Ende
1981	Charlotte	Frans Weisz	With Jerzy Lipman
1981	The Girl with the Red Hair	Ben Verbong	
1982	Golven	Annette Apon	
1982	Van de koele meren des doods	Nouchka van Brakel	
1983	De illusionist	Jos Stelling	
1983	De Anna	Erik van Zuylen	
1984	Army Brats	Ruud van Hemert	
1984	De schorpioen	Ben Verbong	
1985	Private Resistance	Dimitri Frenkel Frank	
1985	Het bittere kruid	Kees Van Oostrum	
1986	The Assault	Fons Rademakers	
1986	Mama is boos!	Ruud van Hemert	
1986	The Pointsman	Jos Stelling	With Paul van den Bos, Frans Bromet and Goert Giltay
1987	Zoeken naar Eileen	Rudolf van den Berg	
1987	Der Madonna-Mann	Hans-Christoph Blumenberg	
1988	Crossing Delancey	Joan Micklin Silver	
1988	Miracle Mile	Steve De Jarnatt	
1989	Rooftops	Robert Wise	
1990	The First Power	Robert Resnikoff	
1991	Once Around	Lasse Hallström	
1991	Eyes of an Angel	Robert Harmon	
1991	Body Parts	Eric Red	
1992	Wayne's World	Penelope Spheeris	
1992	Big Girls Don't Cry... They Get Even	Joan Micklin Silver	
1994	Exit to Eden	Garry Marshall	
1994	Les hirondelles ne meurent pas à Jérusalem	Ridha Behi	
1995	Bushwhacked	Greg Beeman	
1997	Volcano	Mick Jackson	
1998	Blade	Stephen Norrington	
1999	Cruel Intentions	Roger Kumble	
1999	Big Daddy	Dennis Dugan	
2000	Little Nicky	Steven Brill	
2001	Double Take	George Gallo	
2002	High Crimes	Carl Franklin	
2003	Out of Time	Carl Franklin	
2004	Little Black Book	Nick Hurran	
2005	Beauty Shop	Bille Woodruff	
2005	Yours, Mine and Ours	Raja Gosnell	
2008	College Road Trip	Roger Kumble	
2008	The Silent Army	Jean van de Velde	
2009	The Hole	Joe Dante	
2010	Grown Ups	Dennis Dugan	
2011	Just Go with It	Dennis Dugan	
2013	Love and Honor	Danny Mooney	
2013	Grown Ups 2	Dennis Dugan	
2013	Homefront	Gary Fleder	
2016	Bad Santa 2	Mark Waters	
2020	The Wrong Missy	Tyler Spindel	
2020	Magic Camp	Mark Waters	
2024	Beautiful Wedding	Roger Kumble	
2025	La Dolce Villa	Mark Waters	
2027	The Haunting in Wicker Park	Gary Fleder	

Short film

Year	Title	Director	Notes
1969	Carna	Adriaan Ditvoorst	With Jan de Bont and Piotr van Dijk
1974	Straf	Olga Madsen	
1990	Salamander	Michèle Ohayon	
1996	Wet	Bob Rafelson	Segment of Tales of Erotica

=== Documentary film ===
Year	Title	Director	Notes
1983	The Future of '36	Willem Thijssen; Linda Van Tulden	
1985	Stranger at Home	Rudolf van den Berg	With Goert Giltay and Jules van den Steenhoven
1985	We komen als vrienden	Marion Bloem	
1991	Let the Good Times Roll	Paul Justman	
1993	It Was a Wonderful Life	Michèle Ohayon	With Bruce Ready and Jacek Laskus
1997	Colors Straight Up	Michèle Ohayon	With Jacek Laskus
2003	Dysfunktional Family	George Gallo	
2005	Cowboy del Amor	Michèle Ohayon	Also credited as producer
2007	Steal a Pencil for Me	Michèle Ohayon	Also credited as producer
2010	S.O.S/State of Security	Michèle Ohayon	Also credited as associate producer
2021	Strip Down, Rise Up	Michèle Ohayon	

=== Television ===
TV movies

Year	Title	Director	Notes
1978	De elektriseermachine van Wimshurst	Erik van Zuylen	
1978	Entrée Brussels	Frans Weisz	
1999	Tuesdays with Morrie	Mick Jackson	
2003	The Street Lawyer	Paris Barclay	Unsold pilot
2008	The Memory Keeper's Daughter	Mick Jackson	
2011	Identity	Gary Fleder	
2014	Deliverance Creek	Jon Amiel	
2014	A.M.P.A.S. Tribute Film: Jean Claude Carriere	Michèle Ohayon	With Rodney Charters
2015	Salem Rogers	Mark Waters	
2015	Cheerleader Death Squad	Mark Waters	
2017	Salamander	Gary Fleder	
2018	#Fashionvictim	Mark Waters	

TV series

Year	Title	Director	Notes
1981	Pim	Maarten Koopman; Orlow Seunke	Episode "Pim en zijn familie"
1996-1997	Women: Stories of Passion	Michèle Ohayon	Episodes "For the Sake of Science" and "Reading for Pleasure"
1997	The Practice	Mick Jackson	Episode "Pilot"
1998	Profiler	Ian Toynton; Kees van Oostrum	Episodes "Breaking Point" and "Lethal Obsession"
2007	The Riches	Carl Franklin; Peter O'Fallon	Episode "Pilot"
2007	October Road	Gary Fleder; Michael Schultz; David Paymer	5 Episodes
2010	Happy Town	Gary Fleder	Episodes "In This Home on Ice" and "I Came to Haplin for the Waters"
2012	Beauty & the Beast	Gary Fleder	Episode "Pilot"
2015	The Art of More	Gary Fleder	Episodes "Heavy Lies the Head" and "Whodunnit?"
2016	Guilt	Gary Fleder; Elizabeth Allen Rosenbaum; Mairzee Almas; Larry Shaw	7 episodes
2019	Carnival Row	Jon Amiel	Episodes "The World to Come" and "The Gloaming"
2019-2020	Bosch	Patrick Cady; Michael McDonough	Episodes "Tunnel Vision" and "Part of the Deal"
2022	SkyMed	Steven A. Adelson	Episodes "Pilots and Nurses and Bears, Oh My!" and "Line Indoc"
