= Live at the Fillmore (Los Lonely Boys album) =

Live album by Los Lonely Boys
- Released: February 22, 2005
- Recorded: October 23, 2004
- Venues: The Fillmore, San Francisco, California
- Genres: Texican rock and roll, blues rock
- Length: 79:24
- Label: Epic
- Producers: Rosalyn Rosen, Kevin Wommack

Los Lonely Boys chronology
Los Lonely Boys (2004)	Live at the Fillmore (2005)	Live at Blue Cat Blues (2005)

Live at the Fillmore is a live album by the American rock band Los Lonely Boys, released on February 22, 2005, by Epic Records. It was recorded on October 23, 2004, at The Fillmore in San Francisco, California.

== Overview ==
The album captures the trio's signature Texican rock and roll sound, blending rock, blues, soul, and Tex-Mex influences. It features live renditions of songs from their debut album, including "Heaven" and "More Than Love", alongside covers of classics like "La Bamba" and "Cisco Kid".

== Track listing ==
All tracks are written by Henry Garza, JoJo Garza & Ringo Garza, unless otherwise noted.

No.	Title	Writer(s)	Length
1.	"Crazy Dream"		6:41
2.	"Hollywood"		6:06
3.	"Man to Beat"		4:58
4.	"More Than Love"		3:08
5.	"Nobody Else"	Henry Garza; JoJo Garza; Ringo Garza; Kevin Wommack	4:58
6.	"Dime Mi Amor"		11:27
7.	"Onda"		13:09
8.	"Velvet Sky"	Henry Garza; JoJo Garza; Ringo Garza; Kevin Wommack; Rosalyn Rosen	5:39
9.	"Cisco Kid"	Thomas Allen; Harold Ray Brown; Morris "BB" Dickerson; Charles Miller; Lee Oskar; Howard E. Scott; Leroy "Lonnie" Jordan	7:27
10.	"La Bamba"	Ritchie Valens	3:21
11.	"Real Emotions"	Henry Garza; JoJo Garza; Ringo Garza; Kevin Wommack	5:43
12.	"Heaven"		6:47
Total length:			1:19:24

== Personnel ==
- Los Lonely Boys
  - Henry Garza – guitar, vocals
  - Jojo Garza – bass, vocals
  - Ringo Garza – drums, vocals
- Production
  - Malcolm Harper – live recording
  - Rosalyn Rosen – producer
  - Kevin Wommack – producer

== Reception ==
The album received positive reviews for its energetic performance and authentic sound. It peaked at number 69 on the Billboard 200 chart.
