= Breakaway (Kelly Clarkson song) =

2004 song by Kelly Clarkson

Single by Kelly Clarkson

from the album The Princess Diaries 2: Royal Engagement - Original Soundtrack and Breakaway
- Released: July 19, 2004
- Studio: Henson (Hollywood)
- Genre: Folk-pop; pop-punk
- Length: 3:57
- Label: Walt Disney; RCA
- Songwriters: Matthew Gerrard; Bridget Benenate; Avril Lavigne
- Producer: John Shanks

Kelly Clarkson singles chronology
"The Trouble with Love Is" (2003)	"Breakaway" (2004)	"Since U Been Gone" (2004)

Alternative cover
- 2006 Re-issue

Music video
- "Breakaway" on YouTube

"Breakaway" is a song recorded by American singer Kelly Clarkson. The folk-pop and pop-punk ballad, written by Matthew Gerrard, Bridget Benenate, and Avril Lavigne, was originally intended for Lavigne's debut studio album, Let Go (2002). After being deemed unsuitable for the album, it was passed to Clarkson to be recorded as a soundtrack for the film The Princess Diaries 2: Royal Engagement (2004). Clarkson, who was finishing her second studio album at that time, recorded "Breakaway" to tide her fans over until the first single from her new album was released. However, the song's success prompted its inclusion on Clarkson's second album, while the record label decided to name the album after the song. "Breakaway" was first released as the first single from The Princess Diaries 2 soundtrack on July 19, 2004. In May 2006, "Breakaway" was reissued as the fifth and final single from the album of the same name.

"Breakaway" received positive reviews from music critics, who could relate to the song's message and simple lyrics. It incorporates acoustic guitars and airy drums which are interspersed with Clarkson's controlled voice. The lyrics narrate Clarkson's journey as a girl growing up in a small town who follows her dream for self-improvement. "Breakaway" was a commercial success outside of the United States, where it peaked within the top 20 of multiple European countries, and in the top 10 in Australia, Belgium, Hungary, and the Netherlands. In the United States, the song peaked at number six on the Billboard Hot 100 chart and became her third top ten song in the chart. It also topped the US Adult Contemporary for twenty-one non-consecutive weeks, a record for female artists that is now shared between herself, Celine Dion's "A New Day Has Come" and Adele's "Hello".

Directed by Dave Meyers, the accompanying music video for "Breakaway" portrays Clarkson as a young girl from a small town who follows her dream and becomes an international star. It also contained scenes interspersed from The Princess Diaries 2: Royal Engagement. Clarkson acted out most of the lyrics in the music video because she felt that the song was autobiographical. Critics responded positively to the music video for being faithful to the central theme shared by the song, the film, and Clarkson's personal biography. Clarkson performed the song in a series of live appearances such as television shows Saturday Night Live, The Oprah Winfrey Show and The Tonight Show with Jay Leno. She has performed the song in her concert tours, including the Stronger Tour. "Breakaway" has also been covered by many contestants from reality television singing competitions, notably Katie Stevens, a contestant in the ninth season of American Idol, as well as an English pop quartet Belle Amie, who finished eleventh in the seventh season of The X Factor.

== Background and release ==
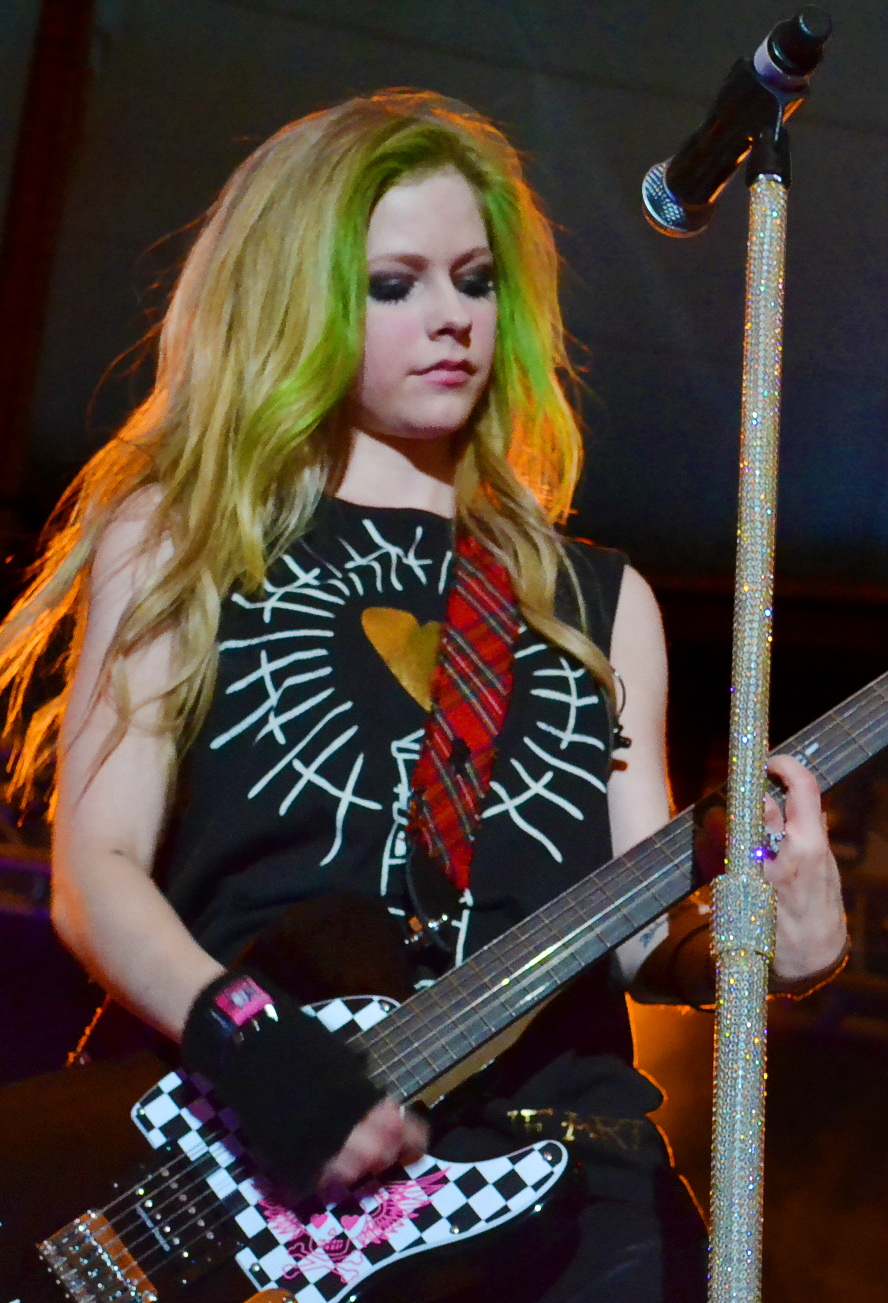
Avril Lavigne co-wrote the song.

"As it turned out, it wasn't quite right for Avril's album, so we pitched it to Kelly Clarkson. It all worked out great. Kelly sounds great singing it, and it was a big hit for us."

— Matthew Gerrard on "Breakaway"'s success.

"Breakaway" was originally written by Avril Lavigne, Bridget Benenate and Matthew Gerrard. According to Benenate, the song was written in 2001 when she was working with Gerrard for Lavigne's first album, Let Go. Benenate explained that Lavigne came to her to write the song, saying:

Avril talked about her life and what things were important to her – she was the inspiration for the song. Matthew began creating the melody and track, and I started working on the lyrics. I remember staying in bed for three days, writing 25 versions of the lyric. I love being in bed and writing lyrics, and having my dog Jet and my kitty Dash on the bed. Anyway, we finally finished the lyric, then we completed the demo.

After the production of the song was deemed unsuitable for Lavigne's album, the song was passed to several artists including Samantha Moore before finally being recorded by Kelly Clarkson. Benenate also added that it was Mitchell Leib, the President of Music and Soundtracks for Walt Disney Pictures and Television/Buena Vista Music Group, who secured "Breakaway" as one of the songs for the soundtrack of The Princess Diaries 2: Royal Engagement; the song was officially released to radio stations as the soundtrack's lead single on July 19, 2004. Clarkson expressed that "Breakaway" was different from everything she has done, saying that it "is a simple song, and I think that its simplicity is what's beautiful about it. Whenever writers or producers come to work with me, they take advantage of the fact that I can really belt it out. What's cool about 'Breakaway' is that it doesn't take advantage of that. The song just uses the simplicity of my voice." In an interview with MTV, Clarkson said that she recorded "Breakaway" to tide fans over until September that year before she released the first single from her second album. Nevertheless, the song's huge success prompted its inclusion on the album, which Clarkson decided to name Breakaway. Lavigne's original demo of the song leaked onto the internet nearly a decade later in April 2014. A brand new recording was officially released as part of the 20th anniversary re-release of her debut album on June 3, 2022.

== Composition ==
"Breakaway"
"Breakaway" features autobiographical lyrics which received generally positive reviews from music critics.

"Breakaway" is a folk-pop and pop-punk song with a length of three minutes and 57 seconds. It is composed in the key of C major, with a tempo of 160 beats per minute. T.U. Dawood of Dawn lauded the song for being the best track on the album, writing ""Breakaway" is an enchanting single that will have you humming along to its infectious, gentle chorus and the inspiring lyrics." It has a chord progression of C–G–Am7-F(9) and Clarkson's vocal range in the song spans two octaves from the low note of G_{3} to the note of D_{5}. Sam Lansky of PopCrush.com thought that Clarkson's vocal floated over strummed guitars and airy drums, a combination which elevated the inspirational message of the song. Dave Donelly of Sputnikmusic noted that "Breakaway" successfully contrasted typical acoustic verse with a soaring pop chorus which was interspersed by Clarkson's controlled but powerful voice.

Lyrically, the song is about growing up and moving on in life. Natalie Nichols of The Baltimore Sun considered "Breakaway" as Clarkson's anthem which is about a small-town girl going for her dreams. Clarkson admitted that she could relate to the song, saying:

It describes how I got into the business, verbatim. I did grow up in a small town, I wanted to get out, I felt like there was something... not better for me, but something different for me. I didn't feel like I fit in at school. Whether you are a DJ, or if you work with computers, or if you're a teacher, everyone has that point where they feel, 'I'm bored and this isn't what I wanted to do with my life.'

== Reception ==
=== Critical response ===
While reviewing the album, Shirley Shipin of Rolling Stone opined that "Breakaway" was the highlight of the album where Clarkson sounded "more Avril than Ashlee". Rhonda Lynn of Florida Entertainment Scene praised the acoustic guitar in the song which is instrumental in holding the whole structure together. Tammy La Gorce of Amazon.com thought that the song would not wear out due to its "rock-friendly thumps, dips, and rolls." In a different perspective, Joan Anderman of Boston.com remarked that "Breakaway" is not new or exciting-sounding but he admitted that the "hit single accomplishes the rare feat of being thoroughly middle-of-the-road without sacrificing grace or intelligence". Chuck Taylor of Billboard felt that the song was a weak choice as a single compared to Clarkson's previous hits, writing "'Breakaway' sounds more like an Irish folk song propped up with pop production than the anthemic material with which Clarkson has won over legions of fans." Kathi Kamen Goldmark of Disney Family.com felt that the song was tedious, simultaneously dull and so emotionally overwrought that it almost sounds like a parody of itself. Michael Wood of The Village Voice described the song as "a swoony acoustic folk-pop that Goo Goo Doll Johnny Rzeznik would trade his hair gel for". Jill Salama of Oprah.com listed "Breakaway" as one of her nine favorite Idol singles of all time, writing "There is nothing that gets us more than a song about a girl going out on her own. Making a wish, making a change and, of course, breaking away. But seriously, this song is more than just a high school graduation anthem."

Bill Lamb of About.com ranked "Breakaway" at number four in his list of Top 10 Kelly Clarkson songs. The song received a nomination in the category of Song of the Year: Adult Hit Radio at the 2005 Radio Music Awards but lost to Green Day's "Boulevard of Broken Dreams". It was one of the recipients of BDSCertified Spin Awards in November 2004 with 100,000 spins accumulated throughout the year. On March 5, 2013, Billboard ranked the song at number five in its list of Top 100 American Idol Hits of All Time. Additionally, it also appeared at number four of Clarkson's Top 15 Biggest Billboard Hot 100 hits through the week ending April 29, 2017.

=== Chart performance ===
On the week ending August 28, 2004, "Breakaway" debuted at number 60 on the Billboard Hot 100. On its tenth week, the song jumped from number 12 to number 10 to become Clarkson's third Top 10 song in the chart, following "A Moment Like This" and "Miss Independent". It peaked at number six on the week ending November 20, 2004. The song spent 46 weeks in Billboard Hot 100, a feat that was later achieved by its immediate successor, "Since U Been Gone". It was certified gold by the Recording Industry Association of America (RIAA) on February 5, 2005. "Breakaway" also debuted at number 37 on the US Pop Songs on the week dated August 21, 2004. Three months later, it peaked at number two on the week ending November 13, 2004, and was held off the top spot by Nelly featuring Tim McGraw's "Over and Over". The song entered Billboard Adult Pop Songs at number 36 on the week dated August 21, 2004, before peaking at number two on the week ending February 12, 2005.

"Breakaway" also made an appearance on the US Adult Contemporary at number 30 on the week ending September 18, 2004. The song fell out of the chart after its debut, before re-entering the chart at the same position of number 30 in its second week. Six months later, "Breakaway" topped Billboard Adult Contemporary, dethroning Los Lonely Boys' "Heaven" on the week ending March 12, 2005. The song spent 20 consecutive weeks at number one on the chart before being dethroned by Michael Bublé's "Home". However, the song returned to top the Billboard Adult Contemporary for the 21st week on the week ending August 6, 2005. With this achievement, "Breakaway" tied the record with Celine Dion's "A New Day Has Come" as the longest-running Adult Contemporary chart-topper by a female artist. "Breakaway" is also the longest-running chart-topper to come from a film in Billboard Adult Contemporary history, surpassing the nineteen-week record held jointly by Phil Collins's "You'll Be in My Heart" from Tarzan and Celine Dion's "Because You Loved Me" from Up Close & Personal. It remains as Clarkson's longest-running number one in her career. As of September 2017, "Breakaway" has sold 2,128,000 paid digital downloads.

Internationally, "Breakaway" was a commercial success. In Australia, "Breakaway" debuted at number 14 on the week ending September 26, 2004, before peaking at number 10, three weeks later. It was certified gold by the Australian Recording Industry Association (ARIA) for shipments of over 35,000 units. In New Zealand, "Breakaway" entered the New Zealand Singles Chart at number 19 on the week ending October 18, 2004. Six weeks later, the song ascended to a new peak of number 12. On July 8, 2006, the song debuted and peaked at number 22 in the United Kingdom. In Ireland, it debuted and peaked at number 12 on the week ending June 29, 2006. Elsewhere in Europe, "Breakaway" peaked at number six in Belgium, number eight in Austria, as well as number nine in the Netherlands.

== Music video ==
Clarkson attending the movie premiere of The Princess Diaries 2: Royal Engagement, as depicted in the music video.

The accompanying music video for "Breakaway" was directed by Dave Meyers, which was shot in two days from July 10 to 11, 2004. In the video, the younger version of Clarkson was played by Lindsey Krueger. According to Meyers, working with Clarkson was a pleasant experience because he felt she was good and honest, although he had initial doubts in the beginning. He explained, "I was a little worried, her coming off 'American Idol,' it inherently feels manufactured and I didn't know how much of it was true artistry. But when I met her, she really does have a good, solid vibe. It was an honor to bring some of that out of her." Since the song is autobiographical, Clarkson decided to act out most of the lyrics in the video. Meyers also realized that the song was featured in The Princess Diaries 2: Royal Engagement and he struggled to find a way to address the film-footage in the music video, saying "Since it's a movie tie-in, the idea stems from trying to figure out a new way of addressing the film-footage requirement they put on you, so we came up with the idea of her attending the premiere, which is very much something she will do in real life."

The video begins with the younger version of Clarkson sitting at the back seat of a station wagon. Singing the first verse, she witnesses a depressing scene of her brother quarreling with her sister who are scolded by their mother. She slowly clasps both her hands before the video shifts to the present day where Clarkson is seen arriving on the red carpet with her publicist for the world premiere of The Princess Diaries 2: Royal Engagement. After posing for the photographers, she enters the cinema and watches the film. The next scene switches back to the younger Clarkson who is sitting and looking around her neighborhood at her house's rooftop as a plane is seen flying across the sky. The video switches back to the older Clarkson who is now watching the aforementioned film in her laptop inside the plane as it goes through a mild turbulence. Clarkson is also seen reminiscing about her past job as a worker in a movie theater, singing with her co-workers. The next scene shows Clarkson singing with her band in a backyard party which is shown alternately with scenes from the film, as well as a montage of her family and co-workers waving away from her. In the final scene, the younger Clarkson is shown praying by her bedside.

The video was uploaded to MTV's website on August 9, 2004. The video reached number five on the AOL Music Top Video chart in September 2004, with 740,176 streams. Johnni Macke of E! deemed the early 2000s as Clarkson's "music video prime". She opined that the video was a great Cinderella story, writing ""Breakaway" shows the story of a young tomboy girl dealing with her insane family and what she grows up into...AKA a popstar named Kelly Clarkson." Kate Aurthur of The New York Times praised the music video for successfully illustrating the message of a girl following her own dream, which is a central theme shared by the song, the movie and Clarkson's biography. She also lauded the director of the video, Dave Meyers, for his ability to use Clarkson's evolution as an element to overshadow the distracting clips from The Princess Diaries: Royal Engagement despite noticing that the use of visual metaphors in the music video was overwrought.

== Live performances ==
Clarkson first performed "Breakaway" on The Tonight Show with Jay Leno in August 2004. In February 2005, she performed "Breakaway" as well as "Since U Been Gone" on Saturday Night Live. On September 23, 2005, she appeared on The Oprah Winfrey Show and performed "Breakaway" as well as "Because of You". While touring at the Palace Theatre in Cleveland, Ohio during her Breakaway World Tour, Clarkson performed "Breakaway" while signing several autographs for her fans near the stage to purposely let the crowd belt out the chorus. "Breakaway" was also included in the setlist of Clarkson's 2009 All I Ever Wanted Tour where she performed the song in Hammerstein Ballroom without any dancers, acrobatics, moving set pieces and no special effects. Caryn Ganz noted that Clarkson belted the ballad song effortlessly by walking back and forth across the stage with her right hand on the mic and her left resting on her chest. Jim Cantiello of MTV opined that Clarkson's "low chest-voice cooed the verses of 'Breakaway'" and complimented the singer's vocal prowess throughout the concert. On April 3, 2012, Clarkson performed "Breakaway" as an encore to her Stronger Tour at Nokia Theatre L.A. Live, Los Angeles, where she told the audience that people started supporting her because of the song.

In 2019, Avril Lavigne performed the song for the first time live at select venues during her Head Above Water Tour.

== Cover versions and use in media ==
"Breakaway" has also been covered by contestants from reality television singing competitions. Katie Stevens covered the song on the ninth season of American Idol. Despite listening to the judges' comments to sing a contemporary song, her rendition was criticized by the judges; Randy Jackson thought the note was too big for Stevens while Ellen DeGeneres felt Stevens did not sell the lyrics. Kara DioGuardi said, "I don't think you know who you are yet as an artist", an opinion agreed by Simon Cowell. Jim Cantiello of MTV noted that Stevens' performance of the song was her weakest performance in the show, stating "Unfortunately, her uneven vocals on 'Breakaway' exposed her youthful inexperience." The same opinion was echoed by Eric Ditzian of MTV who opined that Stevens failed to resonate her youthful energy favouring the song choice.

"Breakaway" was performed by Julie Zorrilla in the semi-finals on the tenth season of American Idol. Samantha Stephens of The Republican felt Zorrilla's performance was mediocre. Gil Kaufman of MTV remarked that Zorrilla's voice was shaky, and it lacked personality. After landing in the bottom two, Belle Amie, an English pop quartet contestant on the seventh season of The X Factor, decided to perform "Breakaway" as their survival song. Nevertheless, they were eliminated in the episode. The song was also performed by Megan Hilty on the episode titled "Understudy" of the American television series Smash, which aired on April 7, 2012. Matt Tucker of KSiteTV.com thought the performance was "lovely", describing it as one of the things that stood out in the episode. The song was covered by Jenna Ushkowitz, Kevin McHale and Darren Criss, on the 97th episode, "Frenemies", of the musical series Glee, which aired on February 25, 2014. For the thirteenth season of American Idol, the song is used as the sendoff song when a contestant is voted off. The contestant who is voted off, their cover of the song is played during the goodbye montage video package. It was also used in The Sisterhood of the Traveling Pants trailer and in the thirtieth season of Brazilian soap opera Malhação. The song was also featured on the 2020 episode "The Son" on the television show Little America.

In 2022, Lavigne released her version of the song for the expanded edition of Let Go to commemorate the 20th anniversary since its release. The lyrics in the demo version, and in the re-released version, the word 'snow' which Kelly Clarkson had changed to 'rain' to fit her perspective.

== Track listings ==
- Australian CD single (Walt Disney Records release)
1. "Breakaway" – 3:58
2. "Because You Live" – 3:18
- Digital download and CD single (RCA Records reissue)
1. "Breakaway" – 3:58
2. "Breakaway" (Napster Live) – 4:17

== Credits and personnel ==
Credits are adapted from the liner notes of Breakaway.

Recording

- Recorded by Jeff Rothschild at Henson Recording Studios, Hollywood, California.

Personnel

- Kelly Clarkson – lead vocals, background vocals and piano
- Avril Lavigne – writer
- Bridget Benenate – writer
- Jeff Rothschild – drums, mixing
- John Shanks – bass, guitar, keyboard, mixing, producer
- Matthew Gerrard – writer

== Charts ==
=== Weekly charts ===
Weekly chart performance for "Breakaway"
Chart (2004–2006)	Peak position
Australia (ARIA)	10
Austria (Ö3 Austria Top 40)	8
Belgium (Ultratip Bubbling Under Flanders)	6
Canada (Nielsen SoundScan)	11
Canada CHR/Pop Top 30 (Radio & Records)	6
Canada Hot AC Top 30 (Radio & Records)	1
Czech Republic Airplay (ČNS IFPI)	53
Denmark Airplay (Tracklisten)	4
Germany (GfK)	13
Germany Airplay (BVMI)	1
Hungary (Rádiós Top 40)	5
Hungary (Single Top 40)	10
Ireland (IRMA)	12
Netherlands (Dutch Top 40)	9
Netherlands (Single Top 100)	30
New Zealand (Recorded Music NZ)	12
Romania (Romanian Top 100)	69
Scottish Singles Sales (Official Charts)	17
Slovakia Airplay (ČNS IFPI)	15
Sweden (Sverigetopplistan)	39
Switzerland (Schweizer Hitparade)	14
UK Singles (OCC)	22
US Billboard Hot 100	6
US Adult Contemporary (Billboard)	1
US Adult Pop Airplay (Billboard)	2
US Pop Airplay (Billboard)	2

=== Year-end charts ===
2004 year-end chart performance for "Breakaway"
Chart (2004)	Position
Australia (ARIA)	91
US Billboard Hot 100	74
US Adult Contemporary (Billboard)	48
US Adult Top 40 (Billboard)	42
US Digital Digital Tracks (Billboard)	35
US Hot Soundtracks Singles (Billboard)	2
US Mainstream Top 40 (Billboard)	34

2005 year-end chart performance for "Breakaway"
Chart (2005)	Position
US Billboard Hot 100	27
US Adult Contemporary (Billboard)	1
US Adult Top 40 (Billboard)	8
US Hot Digital Songs (Billboard)	27
US Mainstream Top 40 (Billboard)	34
US Pop 100 (Billboard)	34
US Top Soundtracks Singles (Billboard)	1

2006 year-end chart performance for "Breakaway"
Chart (2006)	Position
Austria (Ö3 Austria Top 40)	63
Brazil (Crowley)	93
Germany (Media Control GfK)	64
Hungary (Rádiós Top 40)	56
Netherlands (Dutch Top 40)	46
Switzerland (Schweizer Hitparade)	99

=== Decade-end charts ===
Decade-end chart performance for "Breakaway"
Chart (2000–2009)	Position
US Adult Contemporary (Billboard)	24

== Certifications ==
Certifications and sales for "Breakaway"
Region	Certification	Certified units/sales
Australia (ARIA)	Gold	35,000^{^}
Canada (Music Canada)	Gold	10,000^{*}
New Zealand (RMNZ)	Platinum	30,000^{‡}
United Kingdom (BPI)	Platinum	600,000^{‡}
United States (RIAA)	Gold	2,128,000
^{*} Sales figures based on certification alone.^{^} Shipments figures based on certification alone.^{‡} Sales+streaming figures based on certification alone.

== Release history ==
Release dates and formats for "Breakaway"
Region	Date	Format(s)	Label(s)	Ref.
United States	July 19, 2004	Contemporary hit radio	Walt Disney	
Australia	September 13, 2004	CD	Universal Music	
Finland	May 31, 2006	Digital download	Sony BMG	
France	June 16, 2006	Digital download	Jive	
Germany	June 16, 2006	Digital download	Sony BMG	
Ireland	June 16, 2006	Digital download	Sony BMG	
Spain	June 16, 2006	Digital download	Sony BMG	
United Kingdom	June 19, 2006	Digital download	RCA	
United Kingdom	June 26, 2006	CD	RCA	
Germany	July 28, 2006	CD	Sony BMG	

== See also ==
- List of Billboard Adult Contemporary number ones of 2005
