= Joseph Julian Gonzalez =

American composer

Joseph Julián González
- Occupation: Film and television composer
- Years active: 1995–present

Joseph Julián González is an American composer based in Los Angeles, California. Working primarily as a composer for television and film, he also composes for live orchestra and choir performance.

== Education ==
Born and raised in Bakersfield, California, the son of former farm worker parents, González began his musical education at California State University, Bakersfield, where he studied under Dr. Doug Davis, professor of composition and director of CSUB's Jazz Ensemble. Davis encouraged González to apply for a scholarship to the University of California, Los Angeles, to complete his undergraduate degree, where he majored in classical guitar performance and composition for motion picture. While at UCLA, González studied under David Raksin. He has also studied under Elaine Barkin, Roger Bourland, John Adams, Osvaldo Golijov, and Thomas Newman.

== Career ==
=== Early career ===
After finishing his education at UCLA, González toured with the New Christy Minstrels, and then became music director for Luis Valdez' El Teatro Campesino.

=== Film and television ===
González' first televised composition was the PBS broadcast of La Pastorela as part of its Great Performances program. La Pastorela was initially a production of El Teatro Campesino, a Christmas pageant set in a Tex-Mex milieu, featuring Linda Ronstadt, Lupe Ontiveros, Paul Rodriguez and Cheech Marin. Since then, González' compositions have been featured in over 200 films, documentaries, and television programs. Some of the most prominent of his compositions for film and television include Quentin Tarantino's Jackie Brown and Curdled, the Academy Award-nominated documentary Colors Straight Up, Lifetime Television's feature-length Little Girl Lost, and the entire run of the Showtime series Resurrection Blvd. His work in the documentary world includes composing soundtracks for the Emmy Award-winning Made in L.A., as well as other award-winning documentaries, including Angels in the Dust, Steal a Pencil for Me, and Cowboy del Amor.

=== Misa Azteca ===
In 1997, as part of the Meet the Composer program, González was commissioned to write his Misa Azteca, which debuted on Dec. 4, 1997, at the Tijuana Cultural Center (Centro Cultural de Tijuana) performed by the Orquesta de Baja California, the Southwestern College Choir of Chula Vista, California, and Tribu, a four-piece pre-Columbian percussion ensemble from Mexico City. On July 9, 2006, the Gloria from Misa Azteca was performed in the Concert Hall of the Sydney Opera House in Sydney, Australia. On June 18, 2009, the Sanctus from Misa Azteca was performed in Paris, France, at the Basilica of St. Denis, performed by the Hispanic Choir of the Cathedral of Our Lady of the Angels from Los Angeles, California, conducted by Antonio Espinal. Misa Azteca was also performed at the Sorbonne and the American Cathedral in Paris (Episcopal). Selections of Misa Azteca were subsequently performed at Carnegie Hall in New York City on Feb. 20, 2011. Members of the L.A. Philharmonic performed Misa Azteca June 19, 2011, at Walt Disney Concert Hall. Misa Azteca was scheduled to be again performed as part of the Festival of the Aegean on July 10 and 11, 2013, on the island of Syros, Greece.

Misa Azteca is a musical composition which combines Spanish and Latin texts of the Roman Catholic liturgy with songs from the Cantares Mexicanos, the largest collection of pre-Columbian Nahuatl songs or poems to have been recorded. González was influenced by Johann Sebastian Bach's Mass in B Minor, and in the manner of Stravinsky and Orff sought to create a "similar [blend] of old and new," giving the piece "a neo-Baroque flavor."

=== Films ===
Title	Year	Notes
Curdled	1996	
Colors Straight Up	1997	Feature documentary
Jackie Brown	1997	Song from the feature soundtrack: "Chicks Who Love Guns"
Chuck & Buck	2000	Song from the feature soundtrack: "Bittersweet"
Price of Glory	2000	
Cowboy del Amor	2005	Feature documentary
Los Lonely Boys: Cottonfields and Crossroads	2006	Feature documentary
Lalo Guerrero: The Original Chicano	2006	Feature documentary
Steal a Pencil for Me	2007	Feature documentary
Angels in the Dust	2007	Feature documentary
Made in L.A.	2007	Feature documentary
Chevolution	2008	Feature documentary
The Washingtons of Sulgrave Manor	2011	Feature documentary
S.O.S./State of Security	2011	Feature documentary
Children of Giant	2014	Feature documentary (filming)

=== Television ===
Title	Year	Notes
Great Performances	1991	TV movie
For the Love of My Child: The Anissa Ayala Story	1993	TV movie
The Cisco Kid	1994	TV movie
Lifestories: Families in Crisis	1994	TV series, episode: POWER: The Eddie Matos Story
Chicano! History of the Mexican-American Civil Rights Movement	1996	TV documentary
Foto Novelas: Seeing Through Walls	1997	TV short
Foto Novelas: In the Mirror	1997	TV short
Foto Novelas: The Fix	1997	TV short
Searching for San Diego: San Ysidro	1997	TV documentary
Adventures from the Book of Virtues	1997	TV series, 6 episodes
Reyes y Rey	1998	TV series
The Border	1999	TV documentary
Resurrection Blvd.	2000	TV series
The Forgotten Americans	2000	TV documentary
Visiones: Latino Art and Culture	2004	TV mini-series documentary
Cinco de Mayo	2004	TV documentary
Survival in the Weave	2006	TV short
P.O.V.	2007	TV documentary series, episode: Made in L.A.
Little Girl Lost: The Delimar Vera Story	2008	TV movie
One Hot Summer	2009	TV movie
Los Americans	2011	TV series
We Have Your Husband	2011	TV movie
Rebel	2012	TV documentary
Meddling Mom	2013	TV movie

=== Short films and other works ===
Title	Year	Notes
How Else Am I Supposed To Know I'm Still Alive	1991	Short film
Pepino Mango Nance	1996	Documentary short
Echoes from Juniper Canyon	2004	Short
Rendezvous	2005	Short film
Alfred Hitchcock's Lifeboat: The Theater of War	2005	Video documentary short
Discovering Eloy Torres	2009	Documentary short
Rebel	2012	Video documentary (post-production)
