= Texican Style: Live from Austin =

Video by Los Lonely Boys
- Released: September 14, 2004
- Recorded: March 20, 2004
- Genre: Chicano rock, blues rock, Tex-Mex
- Length: 96 minutes

Texican Style: Live from Austin was recorded in March 2004 at Auditorium Shores in downtown Austin, Texas. It is estimated that more than 25,000 people filled the park that night to hear Henry, Jojo and Ringo Garza perform live. While many of these songs are on the 2003 album, "I Am The Man To Beat" and "Suppertime" have not been released in any other format. The bonus contents include interviews and a tour of San Angelo, Texas. The DVD was certified platinum by the RIAA.

== Track listing ==
1. "Intro of Los Lonely Boys'"
2. "Crazy Dream"
3. "Dime Mi Amor"
4. "Nobody Else"
5. "Velvet Sky"
6. "I Am the Man to Beat"
7. "Onda"
8. "Suppertime"
9. "Hollywood"
10. "Real Emotions"
11. "Señorita"
12. "Heaven"
13. "End of a New Beginning"
14. "Credits"
