= Women: Stories of Passion =

American television series

- Created by: Elisa M. Rothstein
- Country of origin: United States
- Original language: English
- No. of seasons: 3
- No. of episodes: 39

Production
- Executive producer: Elisa M. Rothstein
- Running time: 30 minutes
- Production companies: Women Productions; Playboy Entertainment Group

Original release
- Network: Showtime
- Release: August 31, 1996 – April 4, 1999

Women: Stories of Passion is an American anthology drama series that aired on the American cable television network Showtime from August 31, 1996 until April 4, 1999. and distributed by Playboy Entertainment overseas.

The episodes were based on stories of love and passion from a woman's point of view.

== Episodes ==
=== Season 1 (1996) ===
No. overall	No. in season	Title	Directed by	Written by	Original release date
1	1	"Sing, Sing Me the Blues"	Lise Raven	Emily Ervolina	August 31, 1996
2	2	"Warm Hands, Cold Heart"	Carrington Stark	Emily Ervolina	September 7, 1996
3	3	"La Limpia (The Cleansing)"	Sylvia Fimbres	Yolanda Escoboza	September 14, 1996
4	4	"For the Sake of Science"	Michèle Ohayon	Nancy Rommelmann	September 20, 1996
5	5	"Wishful Thinking"	Valerie Landsburg	Laura Latima	September 28, 1996
6	6	"Kat Tails"	Larra Anderson	Larra Anderson	October 5, 1996
7	7	"Table Service"	Unknown	Emily Ervolina	October 12, 1996
8	8	"City of Men"	Adele Bertei	Adele Bertei	October 19, 1996
9	9	"Gun Shy"	Lise Raven	Lise Raven	October 26, 1996
10	10	"Blind Love"	Mary Woronov	Mary Woronov	November 2, 1996
11	11	"As Always, Madelaine"	Sharyn C. Blumenthal	Sharyn C. Blumenthal	November 9, 1996
12	12	"Astral Eros"	Mary Woronov	Emily Ervolina & D.M. LeMattre	November 16, 1996
13	13	"The Boxer"	Lise Raven	Libby McDonald	November 23, 1996

=== Season 2 (1997) ===
No. overall	No. in season	Title	Directed by	Written by	Original release date
14	1	"Mind's Eye"	Deirdre Fishel	Deirdre Fishel	July 12, 1997
15	2	"Motel Magic"	Valerie Landsburg	Nancy Beverly	July 19, 1997
16	3	"The Diamond Merchant"	Adele Bertei	Adele Bertei & Libby McDonald	July 26, 1997
17	4	"The Bitter and the Sweet"	Valerie Landsburg	Elisa Rothstein	August 2, 1997
18	5	"Grip Till It Hurts"	Julie Dash	Julie Dash	August 9, 1997
19	6	"Chinese Take-Out"	Kathy Chin	Kathy Chin	August 16, 1997
20	7	"The Little Vampire"	Mary Woronov	Mary Woronov	August 23, 1997
21	8	"Woman on a Train"	Sharyn C. Blumenthal	Sharyn C. Blumenthal	August 30, 1997
22	9	"Room 1503"	Cat X	Cat X	September 6, 1997
23	10	"Reading for Pleasure"	Michèle Ohayon	Nancy Rommelmann	September 13, 1997
24	11	"Father and Son"	Valerie Landsburg	Emily Ervolina	September 20, 1997
25	12	"Hat Trick"	Valerie Landsburg	Valerie Landsburg	September 27, 1997
26	13	"Back to the Garden"	Valerie Landsburg	Emily Ervolina	October 4, 1997

=== Season 3 (1999) ===
No. overall	No. in season	Title	Directed by	Written by	Original release date
27	1	"Lover from Another Planet"	Unknown	Unknown	January 10, 1999
28	2	"The Lucky Bar"	Adele Bertei	Adele Bertei	January 17, 1999
29	3	"Miami Beach Tango"	Tammara Wells	Tammara Wells	January 24, 1999
30	4	"The Gigolo"	Mary Woronov	Mary Woronov	January 31, 1999
31	5	"Voodoo"	Unknown	Unknown	February 7, 1999
32	6	"The Photographer"	Sharyn C. Blumenthal	Sharyn C. Blumenthal	February 14, 1999
33	7	"The Tender Thief"	Anne L. Peters	Unknown	February 21, 1999
34	8	"Trio"	Valerie Landsburg	Valerie Landsburg	February 28, 1999
35	9	"The Feather"	Adele Bertei	Jocelyn Wright	March 7, 1999
36	10	"Luck is a Lady"	Valerie Landsburg	Emily Ervolina	March 14, 1999
37	11	"Sophie Shpooricky's Night of Love"	Andrea Odezynska	Andrea Odezynska	March 21, 1999
38	12	"Angel from the Sky"	Sylvia Fimbres	Sylvia Fimbres	March 28, 1999
39	13	"Paradise Found"	Elisa M. Rothstein	Elisa M. Rothstein	April 4, 1999
