= Almudena Carracedo =

Spanish filmmaker (born 1972)

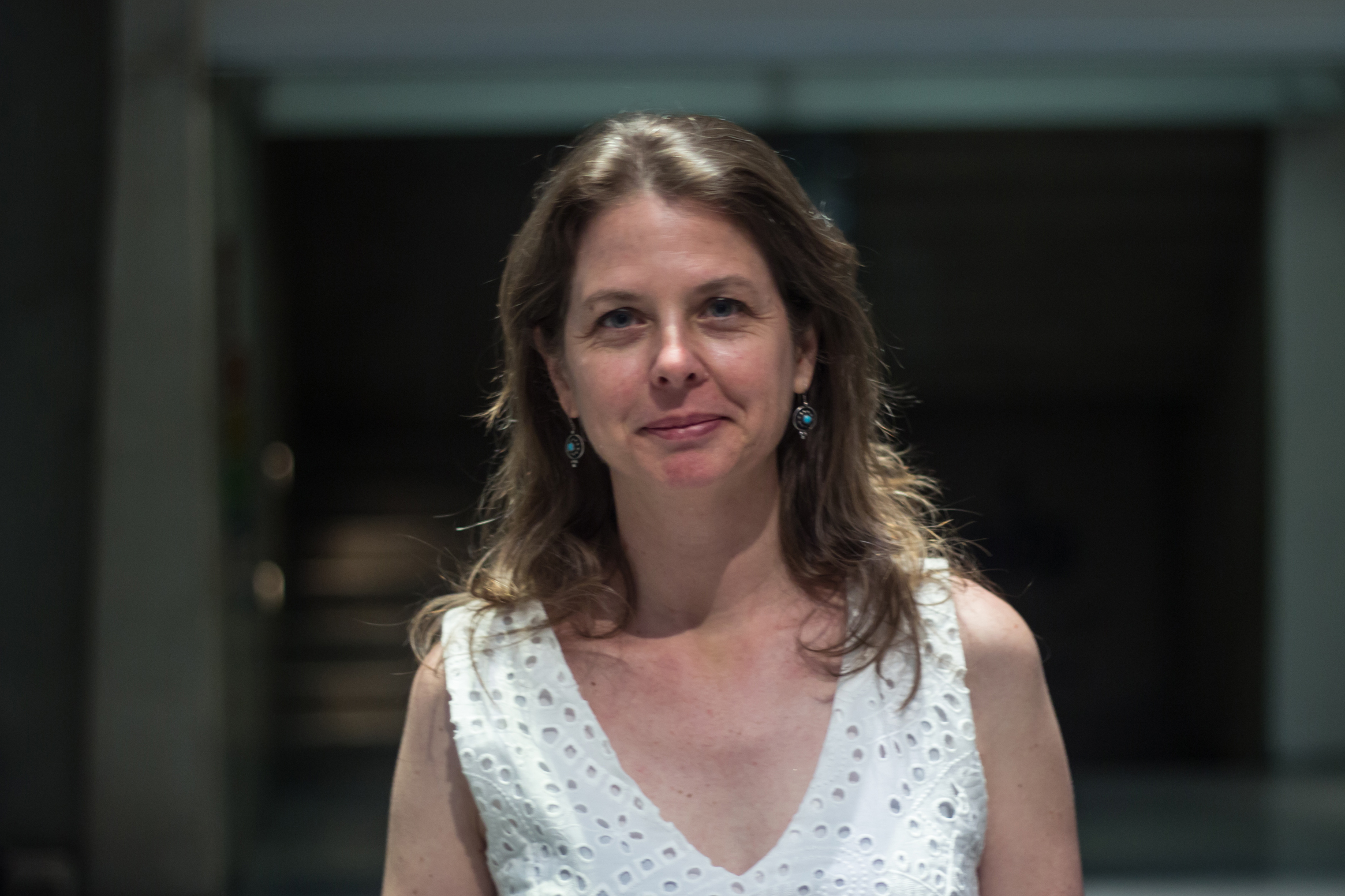
- Born: Almudena Carracedo Verde; 1972 (age 53–54); Madrid, Spain
- Education: Complutense University of Madrid; UCLA School of Theater, Film and Television.
- Occupations: Film director, producer, and screenwriter
- Awards: Emmy Award (2008); Goya Award (2019)

Almudena Carracedo Verde (born 1972) is a Spanish filmmaker. She received an Emmy Award in 2008 for Made in L.A., which was praised by The New York Times as "an excellent documentary about the most basic human dignity." In 2019, she received the Goya Award for best documentary film for The Silence of Others.

== Biography ==
Almudena Carracedo was born in Madrid and earned a licentiate in audiovisual communication at the Complutense University. She continued her training at the UCLA School of Theater, Film and Television. She and Robert Bahar are co-owners of the Brooklyn-based Semilla Verde Productions Ltd.

In 2009, after the success of their documentary Made in L.A., she received the Estela Award from the National Association of Latino Independent Producers (NALIP), and in the following years she obtained scholarships from several organizations that support film and documentary production: United States Artists (2009), Sundance Institute and Time Warner Foundation (2012), Creative Capital (2012), and a Guggenheim Fellowship in the Creative Arts (2015).

Carracedo and Bahar next set out to film a documentary about the silenced victims of Francoist Repression in Spain. The result, titled The Silence of Others, which they had worked on for six years, premiered in the Panorama section of the 68th Berlin International Film Festival in 2018, where it received the Audience Award and the Heinrich Böll Foundation's Peace Film Prize. In August 2018, it was nominated for a European Film Award.

In 2024, Carracedo and Bahar's documentary You Are Not Alone: Fighting the Wolf Pack, on the La Manada rape case, premiered on Netflix and in Spanish theaters.

Carracedo has been a juror at numerous festivals, including the Valladolid International Film Week (SEMINCI), Silverdocs, and the Santiago International Documentary Festival, as well as a delegate of the documentary section at the Association of Women Filmmakers and Audiovisual Media.

In addition to her work as a filmmaker, Carracedo teaches classes and workshops at several universities, and is a part-time lecturer on documentary production at New York University in Madrid.

== Awards and recognition ==
- 2008: News and Documentary Emmy for Made in L.A.
- 2009: NALIP Estela Award for Made in L.A.
- 2019: Goya Award for best documentary film for The Silence of Others
- 2019: School Jury Prize at the Spanish Film Festival in Nantes for The Silence of Others

Illinois Wesleyan University recognized Carracedo with an honorary Doctorate of Humane Letters in 2011. During a subsequent visit to the campus in 2019, she expressed her outlook as a filmmaker:

Telling people to fight for their dreams is too simple because there are so many people who don't have the luxury or the privilege to fight for their dreams. In parts of our lives, there are moments where we have to fight for our dignity, whether it's at work or at home with our political views, our sexual orientation. I think the films are examples of endurance that help people see that yes you can – que si se puede.

== Filmography ==
- Rotation (1996; experimental short film) – director, producer, director of photography
- Welcome, a Docu-Journey of Impressions (2002) – director, producer, director of photography
- Made in L.A. (2007) – director, producer, director of photography
- The Silence of Others (2018) – director, producer, director of photography
- You Are Not Alone: Fighting the Wolf Pack (2024) – director, producer, writer, director of photography
