= Made in L.A. =

Made in L.A. may refer to:

- Made in L.A. (2007 film), documentary on the garment trade
- Made in L.A. (EP), released in 2014 by Mila J
- Made in L.A., another name for L.A. Takedown, a 1989 TV movie
- Made in L.A. (exhibition), a recurring art exhibit at the Hammer Museum in Los Angeles
