= The Silence of Others =

- Film poster
- Spanish: El silencio de otros
- Directed by: Almudena Carracedo; Robert Bahar
- Written by: Almudena Carracedo; Robert Bahar
- Produced by: Almudena Carracedo; Robert Bahar; Agustín Almodóvar; Pedro Almodóvar
- Cinematography: Almudena Carracedo
- Edited by: Almudena Carracedo; Kim Roberts
- Music by: Leonardo Heiblum; Jacobo Lieberman
- Production companies: El Deseo; Semilla Verde Productions; Lucernam Films
- Release dates: February 2018 (Berlin); November 16, 2018 (Spain)
- Running time: 95 minutes
- Countries: United States; Spain
- Language: Spanish

The Silence of Others (Spanish: El silencio de otros) is an American–Spanish documentary film, written and directed by Almudena Carracedo and Robert Bahar, that tells the story of the silenced fight of the victims of the dictatorship of Francisco Franco.

Since its release, the film has received several accolades, including the Goya Award for Best Documentary, the Platino Award for Best Documentary and the News & Documentary Emmy Awards. It was one of fifteen films shortlisted for the Academy Award for Best Documentary Feature at the 91st Academy Awards.

== Production ==
Filmed over six years, the documentary follows assorted survivors of Francisco Franco's dictatorship as they organize the groundbreaking “Argentine Lawsuit” (Querella Argentina) to investigate, identify, and sanction those responsible for committing crimes against humanity during that period. They borrowed from similar work in Argentina, that tried members of the military junta. After Franco's death, Spanish leaders had agreed to a kind of amnesty that did not allow for investigation and trials of extrajudicial murders and other abuses.

The film interviews human rights lawyers, torture victims, and the children and grandchildren of victims who were executed and buried in mass graves or otherwise unidentified. Their families were never able to bury them properly. The filmmakers also interview mothers whose newborn children were taken away by the State under Franco-era eugenics programs.

The film was produced in association with El Deseo by Esther García Rodríguez, and brothers Agustin and Pedro Almodóvar. It includes interviews with survivors and human rights activists, such as María Martín López, Ascención Mendieta, and Chato Galante, among others.

Pedro Almodóvar, who helped produce this documentary, returned to this theme in his subsequent feature film Parallel Mothers (2020), which features a woman photographer (played by Penélope Cruz) and her successful campaign to gain official exhumation of a mass grave in her village.

== Release ==
The film premiered at the 68th Berlin International Film Festival in the Panorama Dokumente section. It was theatrically released in Spain on November 16, 2018. It also aired on La 2 on April 4, 2019, achieving almost a million spectators.

In the United States, the film was released as part of the American television series POV on PBS.

== Reception ==
Receiving positive reviews from critics on Rotten Tomatoes, the film holds an approval rating of 100% based on 25 reviews, with an average rating of 7/10. Metacritic, which uses a weighted average, assigned the film a score of 73 out of 100 based on 17 critics, indicating "generally favorable reviews".

Stephen Dalton from The Hollywood Reporter wrote about the subject of the film that “is still a very necessary story, delivered with rigor and conviction". Ben Kenigsberg from The New York Times called the film "informative, if not always as specific as it might have been”.

== Criticism ==
While mainly well-received in Spain and abroad, the film was criticised by some Spanish journalists for perceived inaccuracies. For example, they criticised the scene featuring the exhumation of a mass grave in the Guadalajara cemetery, which was intended to find the body of Timoteo Mendieta. The film did not mention the political roles of those murdered during the war and under Franco's dictatorship. It also did not mention that Mendieta was a trade unionist, that most of those murdered in Guadalajara were workers, and that 38% were unionists.

Rather than being a "pursuit of justice", as the film suggests, this exhumation was performed under a court order for the “transfer of remains” at the request of one of Mendieta's relatives. This aspect was strongly criticized by other victims' relatives and the Foro por la Memoria.

In the scene where the grave is opened, a technician tells Timoteo Mendieta’s daughter, “this is your father”, identifying the body visually, rather than using DNA testing. This identification, although movingly captured in the film, later turned out to be a mistake, as noted in the last lines of the film. The bones shown in that scene and identified by the ARMH technician were not those of Timoteo Mendieta. His bones were found in another mass grave a year later and identified by forensics; only then did his family get to bury his remains properly. This scene was criticized for generating unrealistic expectations for other relatives of the victims of Francoism, as they may wrongly believe that it is straightforward to locate relatives' bodies, when in fact successful identifications have been rare.

== Awards and nominations ==
Year	Award	Category	Recipient(s)	Result	Ref.
2018	Berlin International Film Festival	Peace Film Prize	Won		
2018	Berlin International Film Festival	Panorama Audience Award	Won		
2018	Medals of the Circle of Cinematographic Writers	Best Documentary Film	Nominated		
2018	European Film Awards	Best Documentary	Nominated		
2018	Goya Awards	Best Documentary	Won		
2019	Feroz Awards	Best Documentary Film	Nominated		
2019	José María Forqué Awards	Best Documentary Film	Won		
2019	Peabody Award		Won		
2019	Platino Awards	Best Documentary	Won		
2020	News & Documentary Emmy Awards	Best Documentary	Won		
2020	News & Documentary Emmy Awards	Outstanding Politics and Government Documentary	Won		

== See also ==
- List of Spanish films of 2018
