= Bob Pranga =

American Christmas and holidays decorator

- Born: Michigan, US
- Known for: Christmas and holiday decorations
- Partner: Debi Staron
- Website: https://www.drchristmas.com/

Bob Pranga is an American actor, author and decorator. He is the co-founder of Dr. Christmas, a Christmas and holiday decorations company. Pranga was born in Michigan relocating to New York and L.A. to be an actor.

== Christmas decorations ==
Pranga worked at Macy's department store and was assigned to work on the Christmas floor, where he developed interest in Christmas decorations.

After moving to Los Angeles, Pranga and his partner, Debi Staron worked at Christmas stores in Glendale, Woodland Hills and Beverly Hills. While working at Beverly Hills, Pranga met Kathy Richards Hilton who hired him to do holiday designs for her boutique. The connection between Pranga and Hilton resulted in him being featured on The Anna Nicole Show.

In 1984, Pranga and his partner, Debi Staron co-founded Dr. Christmas company and based its headquarters at Los Angeles, California.

In 2004, Pranga and Debi Staron co-authored the book, Christmas Style.

== Notable clients ==
- Kirstie Alley
- Kate Hudson
- Christina Aguilera
- Mark Wahlberg
- Barbra Streisand
- Bob Hope
- Andy García
- Carrie Fisher
- Leeza Gibbons
- Debbie Reynolds
- Nancy Reagan
- Steven Spielberg
- J.J. Abrams
- James Cameron

== Filmography ==
- DemonHuntr – 2021
- TLC Presents – 2013
- Made in L.A. – 2005
