= It Was a Wonderful Life =

- Directed by: Michèle Ohayon
- Produced by: Michèle Ohayon; Tamar E. Glaser
- Starring: Lou Hall; Reena Sands; Majorie Bard; Jeanette Goldberg; Terry Dotson; Steve Renehan; Gordon Tuthill; Wayne Doss; Dennis Cohen; Linda Hernandez
- Narrated by: Jodie Foster
- Cinematography: Theo van de Sande; Bruce Ready; Jacek Laskus
- Edited by: Mark C. Baldwin; Lisa Leeman; Anne Stein
- Music by: Melissa Etheridge
- Distributed by: CineWomen
- Release date: 1993
- Running time: 82 minutes
- Country: United States
- Language: English

It Was a Wonderful Life is a 1993 documentary film about homeless women in the United States. It won the Gold Award at the WorldFest-Houston International Film Festival. It was also nominated for an award by the International Documentary Association and for Best Documentary at the Hawaii International Film Festival.

The film follows six homeless women who were once part of the middle class and explores what caused them to become homeless. It was narrated by Jodie Foster.

The film was produced by Michèle Ohayon and Tamar E. Glaser, a descendant of "The Glaser-Kochavi family", a prominent business family located in Israel and the United States.

Lou Hall, one of the homeless women in the film, took her own life on November 7, 1992.
