= List of Billboard Adult Contemporary number ones of 2005 =

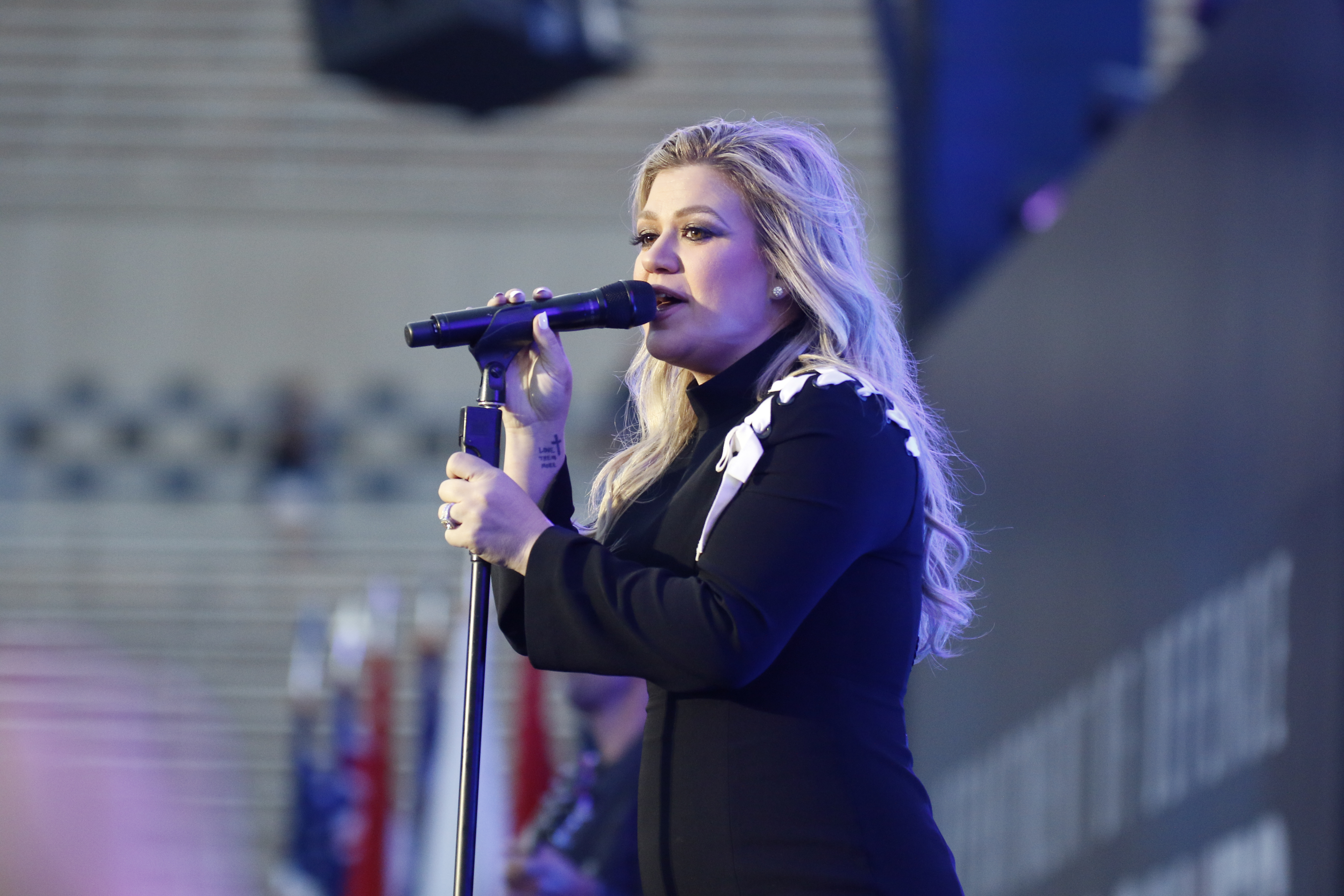
Kelly Clarkson's "Breakaway" spent 20 consecutive weeks at number one.

Adult Contemporary is a chart published by Billboard ranking the top-performing songs in the United States in the adult contemporary music (AC) market. In 2005, six different songs topped the chart in 53 issues of the magazine, based on weekly airplay data from radio stations compiled by Nielsen Broadcast Data Systems.

In the first issue of Billboard of the new year, the number one song was "Believe" by Josh Groban, which was in its fourth week atop the chart. It remained at number one for two weeks in 2005 before being displaced by "Heaven" by Los Lonely Boys. The Chicano rock trio's song had spent ten weeks in the top spot in 2004 and added a further eight weeks to its total in 2005 to finish with a total of 18 weeks at number one. Despite this level of success, it was the group's only AC number one; although the band continued to record, releasing its most recent album in 2014, its final AC chart entry came in 2006. "Heaven" was displaced from the top spot by "Breakaway" by Kelly Clarkson, which went on to spend 20 consecutive weeks at number one. Clarkson won the first season of TV's American Idol in 2002 and quickly achieved a number of major pop hits. Her 2004 album Breakaway, however, moved in a more rock-oriented direction, and the title track gave the singer her first AC number one. She would go on to achieve considerable success on the Adult Contemporary chart in subsequent years, including two further number ones.

Another lengthy run at number one began in the issue of Billboard dated August 20, when "Lonely No More" by Rob Thomas reached the top spot. Taken from the first solo album by Thomas, the lead singer of the band Matchbox Twenty, the song went on to spend 17 consecutive weeks atop the chart. Unusually for an AC chart-topper, the song also reached number one on Billboard's Hot Dance Club Play chart thanks to remixes from producers such as Jason Nevins and the Scumfrog. "Lonely No More" held the top position on the AC listing until the issue of Billboard dated December 17, when it was displaced by Kimberley Locke's recording of the 19th-century Christmas song "Up on the House Top". The former American Idol semi-finalist remained at number one for the final three weeks of 2005. Locke would achieve further Christmas-themed AC number ones in each of the subsequent two Decembers, part of a trend of festive songs topping the AC listing which began in the early 21st century, when stations of the relevant format began devoting their playlists exclusively to seasonal songs in December.

== Chart history ==
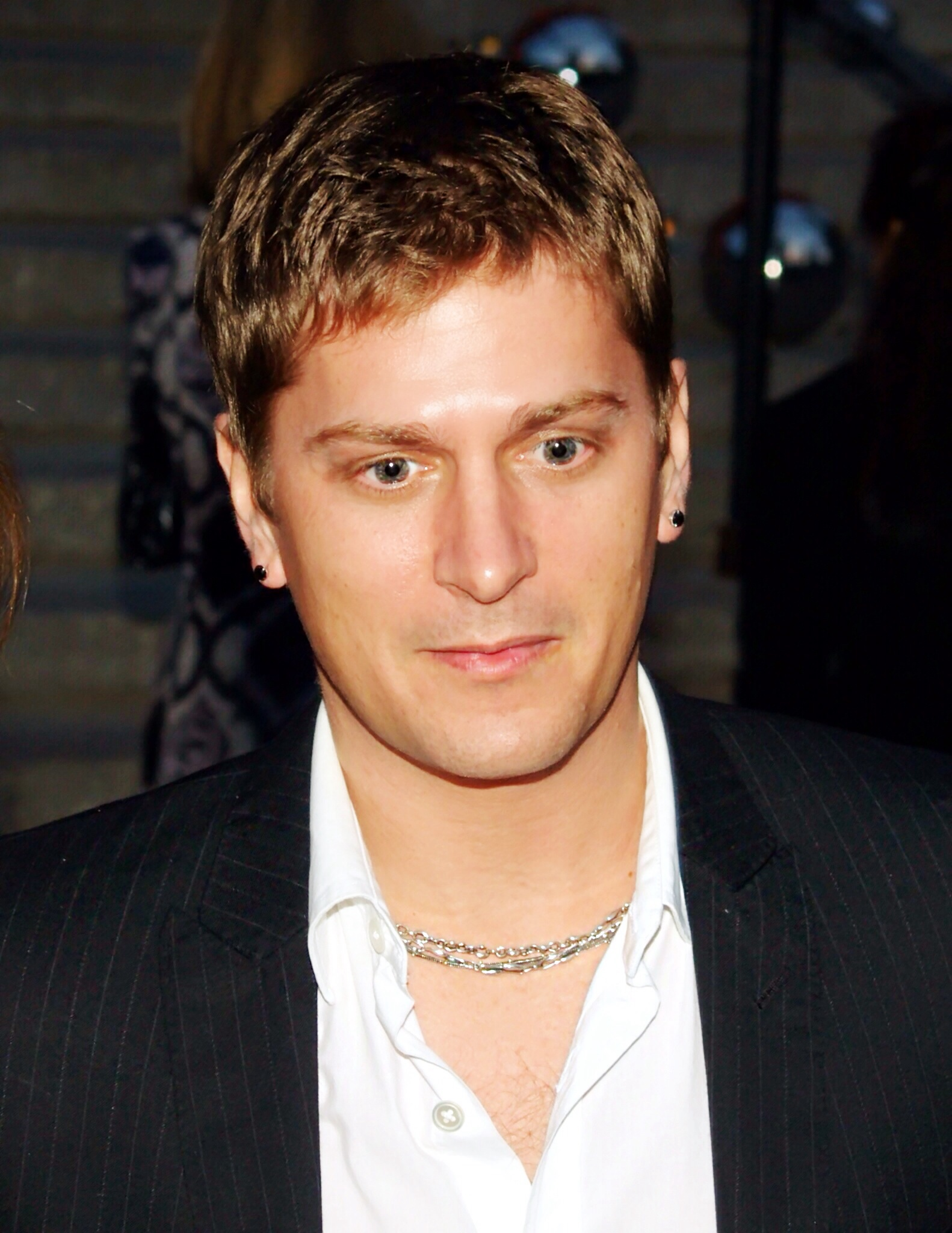
Rob Thomas had a 17-week run at number one with "Lonely No More".

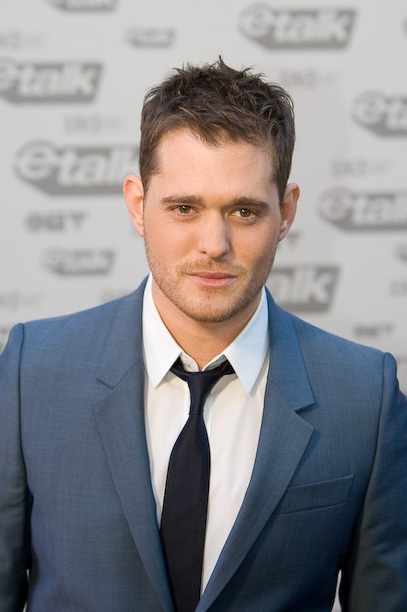
Michael Bublé topped the chart with "Home".

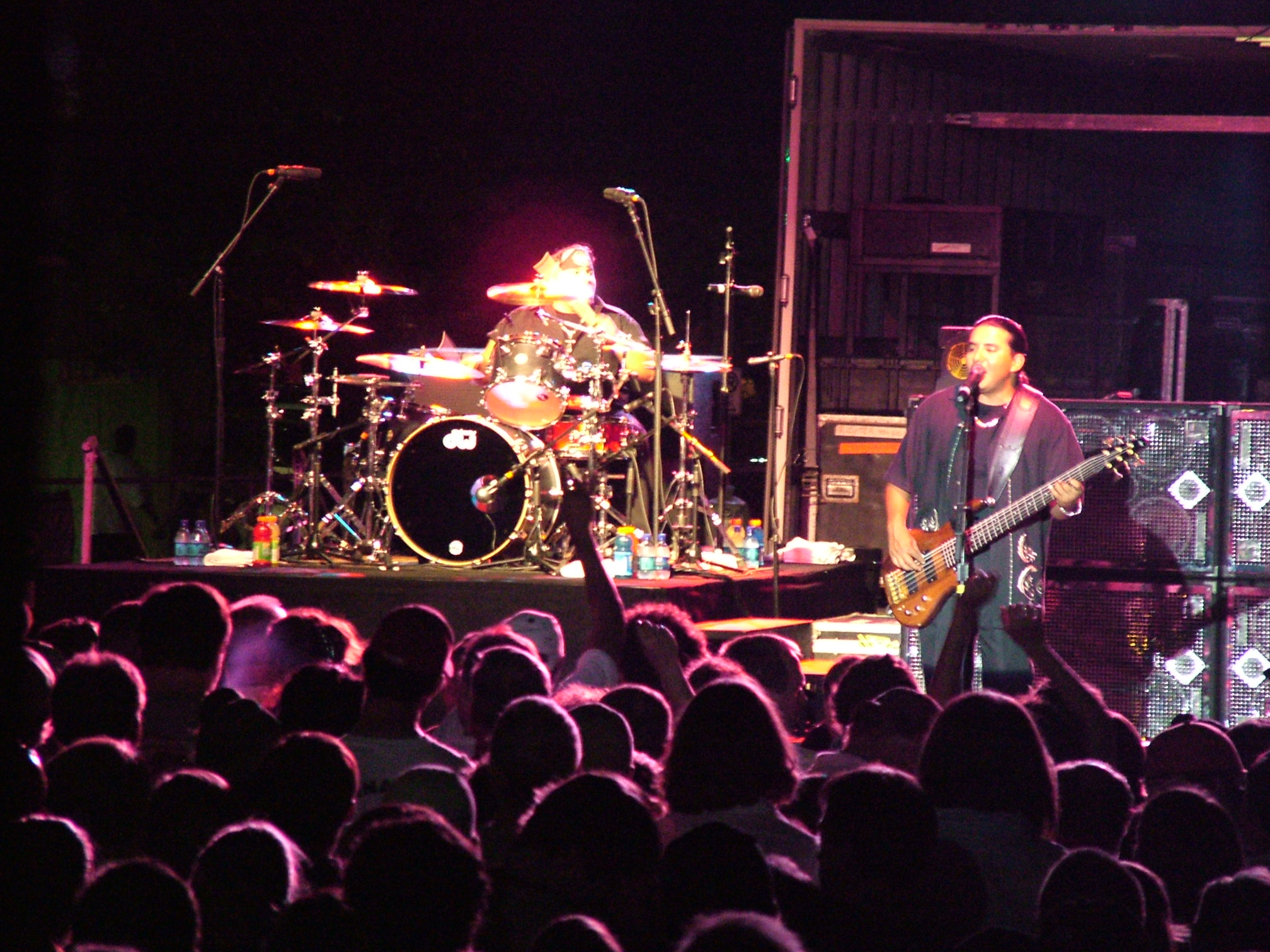
American Chicano rock power trio band Los Lonely Boys topped the chart for eight weeks with "Heaven".

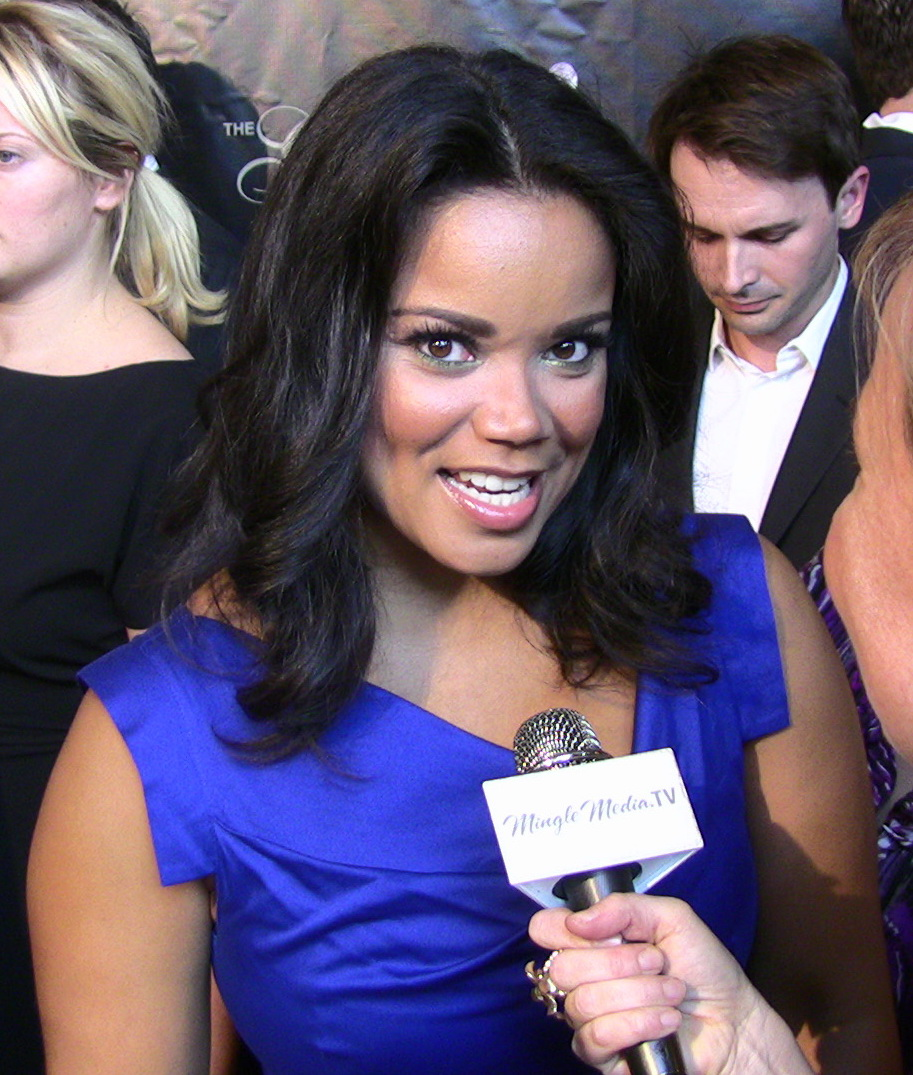
Kimberley Locke ended the year at number one with her version of the Christmas song "Up on the House Top".

Key
†	Indicates best-performing AC song of 2005

Issue date	Title	Artist(s)	Ref.
January 1	"Believe"	Josh Groban	
January 8	"Believe"	Josh Groban	
January 15	"Heaven"	Los Lonely Boys	
January 22	"Heaven"	Los Lonely Boys	
January 29	"Heaven"	Los Lonely Boys	
February 5	"Heaven"	Los Lonely Boys	
February 12	"Heaven"	Los Lonely Boys	
February 19	"Heaven"	Los Lonely Boys	
February 26	"Heaven"	Los Lonely Boys	
March 5	"Heaven"	Los Lonely Boys	
March 12	"Breakaway" †	Kelly Clarkson	
March 19	"Breakaway" †	Kelly Clarkson	
March 26	"Breakaway" †	Kelly Clarkson	
April 2	"Breakaway" †	Kelly Clarkson	
April 9	"Breakaway" †	Kelly Clarkson	
April 16	"Breakaway" †	Kelly Clarkson	
April 23	"Breakaway" †	Kelly Clarkson	
April 30	"Breakaway" †	Kelly Clarkson	
May 7	"Breakaway" †	Kelly Clarkson	
May 14	"Breakaway" †	Kelly Clarkson	
May 21	"Breakaway" †	Kelly Clarkson	
May 28	"Breakaway" †	Kelly Clarkson	
June 4	"Breakaway" †	Kelly Clarkson	
June 11	"Breakaway" †	Kelly Clarkson	
June 18	"Breakaway" †	Kelly Clarkson	
June 25	"Breakaway" †	Kelly Clarkson	
July 2	"Breakaway" †	Kelly Clarkson	
July 9	"Breakaway" †	Kelly Clarkson	
July 16	"Breakaway" †	Kelly Clarkson	
July 23	"Breakaway" †	Kelly Clarkson	
July 30	"Home"	Michael Bublé	
August 6	"Breakaway" †	Kelly Clarkson	
August 13	"Home"	Michael Bublé	
August 20	"Lonely No More"	Rob Thomas	
August 27	"Lonely No More"	Rob Thomas	
September 3	"Lonely No More"	Rob Thomas	
September 10	"Lonely No More"	Rob Thomas	
September 17	"Lonely No More"	Rob Thomas	
September 24	"Lonely No More"	Rob Thomas	
October 1	"Lonely No More"	Rob Thomas	
October 8	"Lonely No More"	Rob Thomas	
October 15	"Lonely No More"	Rob Thomas	
October 22	"Lonely No More"	Rob Thomas	
October 29	"Lonely No More"	Rob Thomas	
November 5	"Lonely No More"	Rob Thomas	
November 12	"Lonely No More"	Rob Thomas	
November 19	"Lonely No More"	Rob Thomas	
November 26	"Lonely No More"	Rob Thomas	
December 3	"Lonely No More"	Rob Thomas	
December 10	"Lonely No More"	Rob Thomas	
December 17	"Up on the House Top"	Kimberley Locke	
December 24	"Up on the House Top"	Kimberley Locke	
December 31	"Up on the House Top"	Kimberley Locke	

== See also ==
- 2005 in music
- List of artists who reached number one on the U.S. Adult Contemporary chart
