= Chato Galante =

Spanish politician (1948–2020)

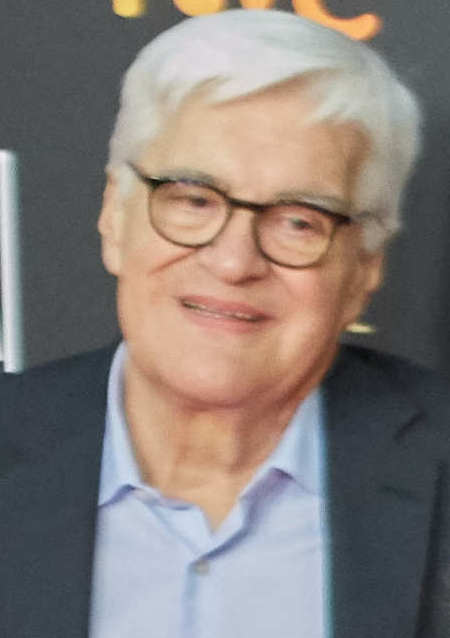
- Galante at the 33rd Goya Awards in February 2019
- Born: José María Galante Serrano; 27 April 1948
- Died: 28 March 2020 (aged 71)
- Known for: Pro-democracy activist and onetime political prisoner

José María Galante Serrano (27 April 1948 – 28 March 2020), best known as Chato Galante, was a Spanish pro-democracy activist.

== Biography ==
Onetime political prisoner during the Franco era. In 1968, he decided to dedicate his life to fight against Franco's dictatorship and was arrested for "illegal association and propaganda". He was 22 at the time. He was incarcerated at the DGS, where he was tortured by Antonio González Pacheco. In 2010, he decided to participate in the complaint filed against the crimes committed during the dictatorship, with the help of Carlos Slepoy. In 2016, this complaint had 311 complainants.

He died from COVID-19 in March 2020, aged 71.
