= Sacred (Los Lonely Boys album) =

Studio album by Los Lonely Boys
- Released: July 18, 2006
- Recorded: 2005
- Genres: Tex-Mex rock, blues
- Length: 50:30
- Label: Epic
- Producers: Los Lonely Boys, John Porter, Mark Wright

Los Lonely Boys chronology
Live at Blue Cat Blues (2006)	Sacred (2006)	Forgiven (2008)

Professional ratings
Review scores
Source	Rating
AllMusic	3.5/5 stars
Blender	3/5 stars
Rolling Stone	3/5 stars
Slant	2/5 stars

Sacred is the Los Lonely Boys' fourth album and their second studio set, released on July 18, 2006. The original title of the album, as shown on the "Diamonds" single printed materials was to be "Òralé", Spanish slang that roughly translates to Right On. "Diamonds", a revised version of the same song from the 1997 album, was the first single to be released on May 8, 2006. This was followed by the single release of "My Way".

The album features a fuller sound than the earlier album, primarily due to extra instruments. The button accordion is prominently featured on "Texican Style", and harmonica on "Home". There are horn accompaniments (trumpet, tenor and baritone sax) on several songs, including "My Way".

Willie Nelson and the band members' father, Enrique Garza, both perform on "Outlaws". Patrick Simmons of the Doobie Brothers is a co-author of "Roses".

== Track listing ==
1. "My Way" – 4:24
2. "Órale" – 3:44
3. "Diamonds" – 3:14
4. "Oyé Mamacita" – 3:31
5. "I Never Met a Woman" – 4:46
6. "Roses" – 3:51
7. "Texican Style" – 4:04
8. "One More Day" – 3:36
9. "Memories" – 4:10
10. "My Loneliness" – 4:44
11. "Outlaws" – 4:41
12. "Home" – 3:40
13. "Living My Life" – 4:26

Bonus Tracks (Walmart)

1. "Iselia" – 3:24

Bonus Tracks (Target)

1. "Man To Beat [Live in San Francisco]" – 5:07
2. "Oye Mamacita [Live in San Francisco]" – 4:36

== Personnel ==
Los Lonely Boys

- Henry Garza - guitar, vocals
- Jojo Garza - bass guitar, vocals
- Ringo Garza - drums, percussion, vocals

Additional

- Lenny Castro - percussion
- Erik Darken - percussion
- Mike Finnegan - organ, piano, keyboards
- Enrique Garza Sr. - vocals
- Al Gomez - trumpet
- Michael Guerra Button - accordion
- Jimmy Hall - harmonica
- Mark "Kaz" Kazanoff - tenor saxophone
- Darrell Leonard - trumpet, trombone
- John H.R. Mills - baritone saxophone
- Willie Nelson - vocals, guitar
- Carl Perazzo - percussion
- John Porter - guitar
- Joe Sublett - tenor saxophone
- Reese Wynans - organ
- Randy Zimmerman - trombone
