= Los Lonely Boys (album) =

Studio album by Los Lonely Boys
- Released: August 12, 2003
- Genres: Chicano rock, blues rock, Tex-Mex
- Length: 55:19
- Labels: Or Music, Epic
- Producer: John Porter

Los Lonely Boys chronology
Teenage Blues (1998)	Los Lonely Boys (2003)	Live at the Fillmore (2005)

Professional ratings
Review scores
Source	Rating
Allmusic	4/5 stars
Blender Magazine	2/5 stars
Rolling Stone Album Guide	3/5 stars
The Village Voice	C+

Los Lonely Boys is the self-titled debut album by the American rock trio Los Lonely Boys, released originally by Or Music on August 12, 2003, and re-released on March 30, 2004 by Epic Records. It features their breakthrough single "Heaven", a number one hit on the Billboard Adult Contemporary charts. The album was certified 2× Platinum by the RIAA on February 22, 2005.

The song "Heaven" appears on the music game Karaoke Revolution Presents: American Idol and is also playable in Guitar Hero On Tour.

== Track listing ==
All songs composed by Henry, Jojo, and Ringo Garza; co-writers in parentheses. Bonus Track 3 is a cover song.

1. "Señorita" – 4:09
2. "Heaven" – 3:46
3. "Crazy Dream" – 4:47
4. "Dime Mi Amor"– 3:26
5. "Hollywood" – 4:15
6. "More Than Love" – 3:16
7. "Nobody Else" (Kevin Wommack) – 4:42
8. "Onda" – 8:54
9. "Real Emotions" (Wommack) – 4:04
10. "Tell Me Why" (Phil Roy) – 3:23
11. "Velvet Sky" (Wommack) – 4:40
12. "La Contestación" (Jim Tullio) – 3:16

Bonus Tracks

1. "Heaven (Spanish Version)" - 3:48
2. "More Than Love (Spanish Version)" - 3:16
3. "I Walk The Line" (Johnny Cash) - 2:44

== Personnel ==
As listed in liner notes.

Los Lonely Boys

- Henry Garza - guitar, vocals
- Jojo Garza - bass, vocals
- Ringo Garza - drums, vocals

Additional musicians

- Diego Simmons - percussion ("Señorita", "Heaven", "Dime Mi Amor", "Hollywood", "Nobody Else", "Real Emotions")
- Eric Darken - percussion ("I Walk The Line")
- Willie Nelson - acoustic guitar ("La Contestación")
- John Porter - acoustic guitar ("More Than Love", "Velvet Sky", "La Contestación")
- Reese Wynans - piano, organ

== Charts ==
=== Weekly charts ===
Chart (2004)	Peak position
US Billboard 200	9
US Heatseekers Albums (Billboard)	1

=== Year-end charts ===
Chart (2004)	Position
US Billboard 200	44
Chart (2005)	Position
US Billboard 200	85

=== Singles ===
Year	Title	Chart Positions			
Year	Title	US AC	US	US Country	US Hot Singles
2003	"Real Emotions"				71
2004	"Heaven"	1	16	46	
2004	"More Than Love"	31			
