= Forgiven (album) =

Studio album by Los Lonely Boys
- Released: July 1, 2008
- Recorded: 2007–08
- Genre: Chicano rock, blues-rock, roots rock, Tex-Mex
- Length: 38:37
- Label: Epic
- Producer: Steve Jordan, Los Lonely Boys

Los Lonely Boys chronology
Sacred (2006)	Forgiven (2008)	1969 (2009)

Professional ratings
Review scores
Source	Rating
AllMusic	4/5 stars
Austin American-Statesman	4/5 stars

Forgiven is the Los Lonely Boys' fifth album and their third studio set, released on July 1, 2008.

The album sticks to their fuller sound, which was showcased in their previous album, Sacred, and is primarily blues based.

== Track listing ==
All songs written by Henry, Jojo and Ringo Garza, except track 5.

1. "Heart Won't Tell a Lie" – 3:51
2. "Forgiven" – 3:33
3. "Staying with Me" – 4:01
4. "Loving You Always" – 2:45
5. "I'm a Man" (Steve Winwood/Jimmy Miller)– 4:04
6. "Make It Better" – 3:26
7. "Love Don't Care about Me" – 3:30
8. "Cruel" – 3:44
9. "You Can't See the Light" – 3:33
10. "Superman" – 3:06
11. "Another Broken Heart" – 3:04
12. "The Way I Feel" – 2:54

Bonus Tracks

1. "There's A War Tonight" - 3:20
2. "Guero In The Barrio" - 3:17

== Personnel ==
Los Lonely Boys

- Henry Garza - vocals, electric and acoustic guitar
- Jojo Garza - vocals, bass guitar, Wurlitzer electric piano
- Ringo Garza - vocals, drums, percussion

Additional

- Dr. John - Hammond B3 on tracks 9, 11, Wurlitzer electric piano on track 12
- Steve Jordan - percussion on track 5
