= National Association of Latino Independent Producers =

- Formation: 1999
- Type: Arts and media nonprofit
- Purpose: Advocating and promoting the professional needs of Latine/x artists in media
- Headquarters: Culver City, CA
- Leader: Diana Luna
- Website: nalip.org

The National Association of Latino Independent Producers (NALIP) is a non-profit advocacy organization that promotes the visibility of Latine/x creators and producers in various media and their projects. The organization was formed in 1999 in New York, and is now headquartered in Los Angeles, CA.

== History ==
NALIP was formed in 1999 by a group of activists and academics in New York. The founding members later moved the organization to Los Angeles to be closer to Latino groups and Hollywood executives. NALIP's early mission was to lobby Hollywood executives to advocate for increased representation of Latino creators and producers.

In 2021, NALIP organized a theater buyout in an attempt to boost the success of the theatrical release of Lin-Manuel Miranda musical film, In The Heights.

== Programs ==
NALIP holds three annual events: The NALIP Media Summit, Latino Media Fest, and Diverse Women in Media Forum. The events takes place in Los Angeles, California.

NALIP also has incubator programs under the "Latino Lens" division of the organization. In 2021, NALIP launched the Narrative Short Film Incubator for Women of Color Sponsored by Netflix.

Previously, NALIP launched "Latino Lens: Producers Pipeline Incubator", an incubator for Latino producers in partnership with Disney, Starz, Amblin Partners, and the Motion Picture Association (MPA).
