= Strip Down, Rise Up =

2021 American documentary film

- Promotional poster
- Directed by: Michèle Ohayon
- Written by: Michèle Ohayon
- Produced by: Michèle Ohayon
- Starring: Keith Ballinger; Amy Bond; Jenyne Butterfly
- Cinematography: Sam Ameen; Leah Anova; Denise Brassard; Sandra Chandler; Svetlana Cvetko; Bryan Donnell; Shaughn Hull; Laela Kilbourn; Moira Morel; Martina Radwan; Theo van de Sande; Emily Topper
- Edited by: Edward Osei-Gyimah
- Music by: Lili Haydn
- Production company: Kavana Entertainment
- Distributed by: Netflix
- Release date: February 5, 2021
- Running time: 112 minutes
- Country: United States
- Language: English

Strip Down, Rise Up is a 2021 American documentary film made for Netflix and directed by Michèle Ohayon. Its story follows a group of women from a variety of ages and backgrounds who engage in pole dancing to heal trauma and body image shame. The film was released on February 5, 2021.
