= Carlos Slepoy =

Argentine human-rights lawyer (1949–2017)

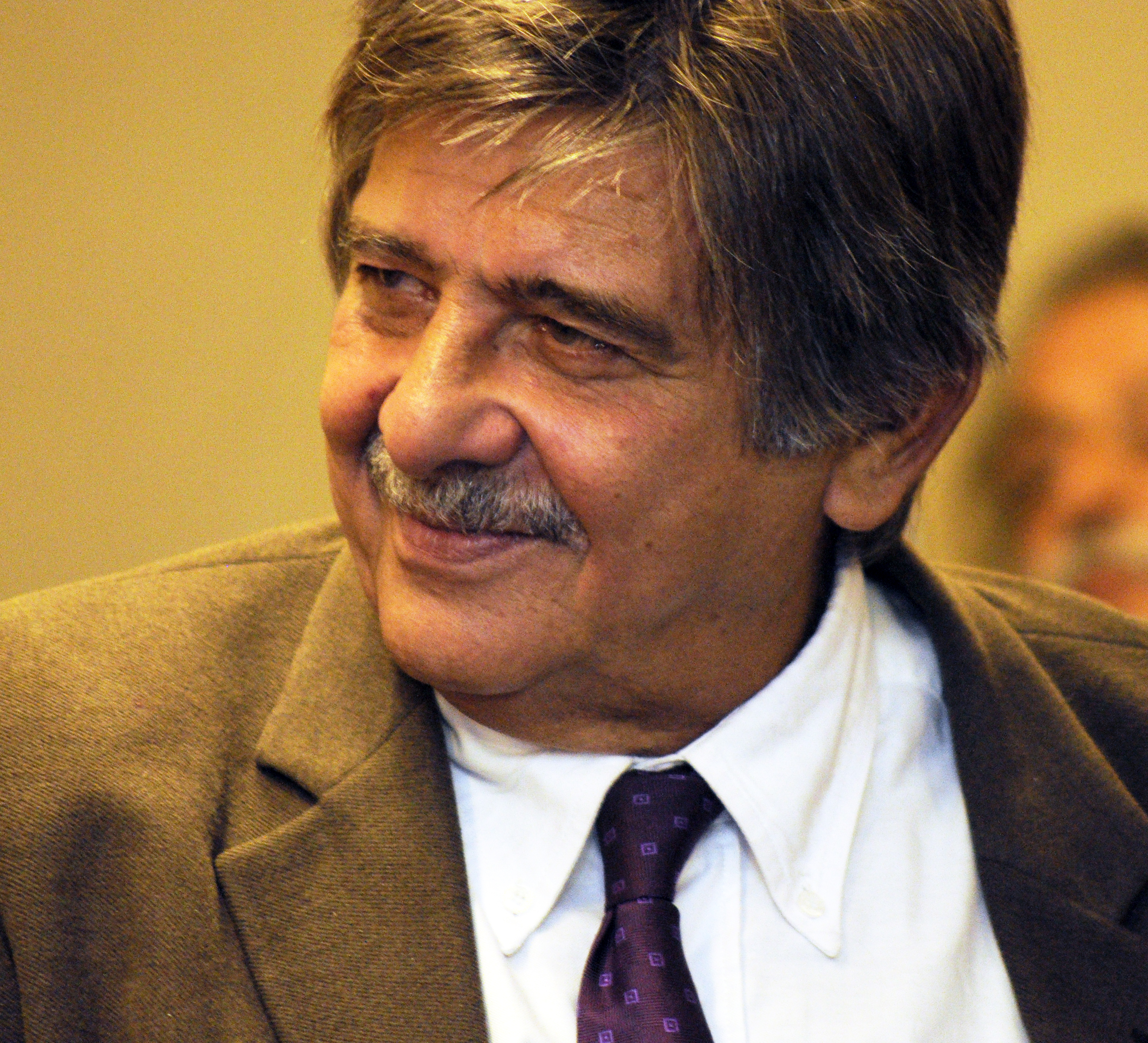
- Carlos Slepoy in 2013
- Born: October 2, 1949; Buenos Aires, Argentina
- Died: April 17, 2017 (aged 67); Madrid, Spain
- Occupation: Human rights lawyer

Carlos Slepoy Prada (October 2, 1949 - April 17, 2017) was an Argentine human rights lawyer. Born in Buenos Aires, he emigrated to Spain in 1979 to escape persecution under Jorge Rafael Videla. He subsequently defended victims of Francisco Franco's regime. He was also involved in litigation over human rights abuses under Augusto Pinochet in Chile, and Efraín Ríos Montt in Guatemala.
