= Nancy Rommelmann =

American journalist and author

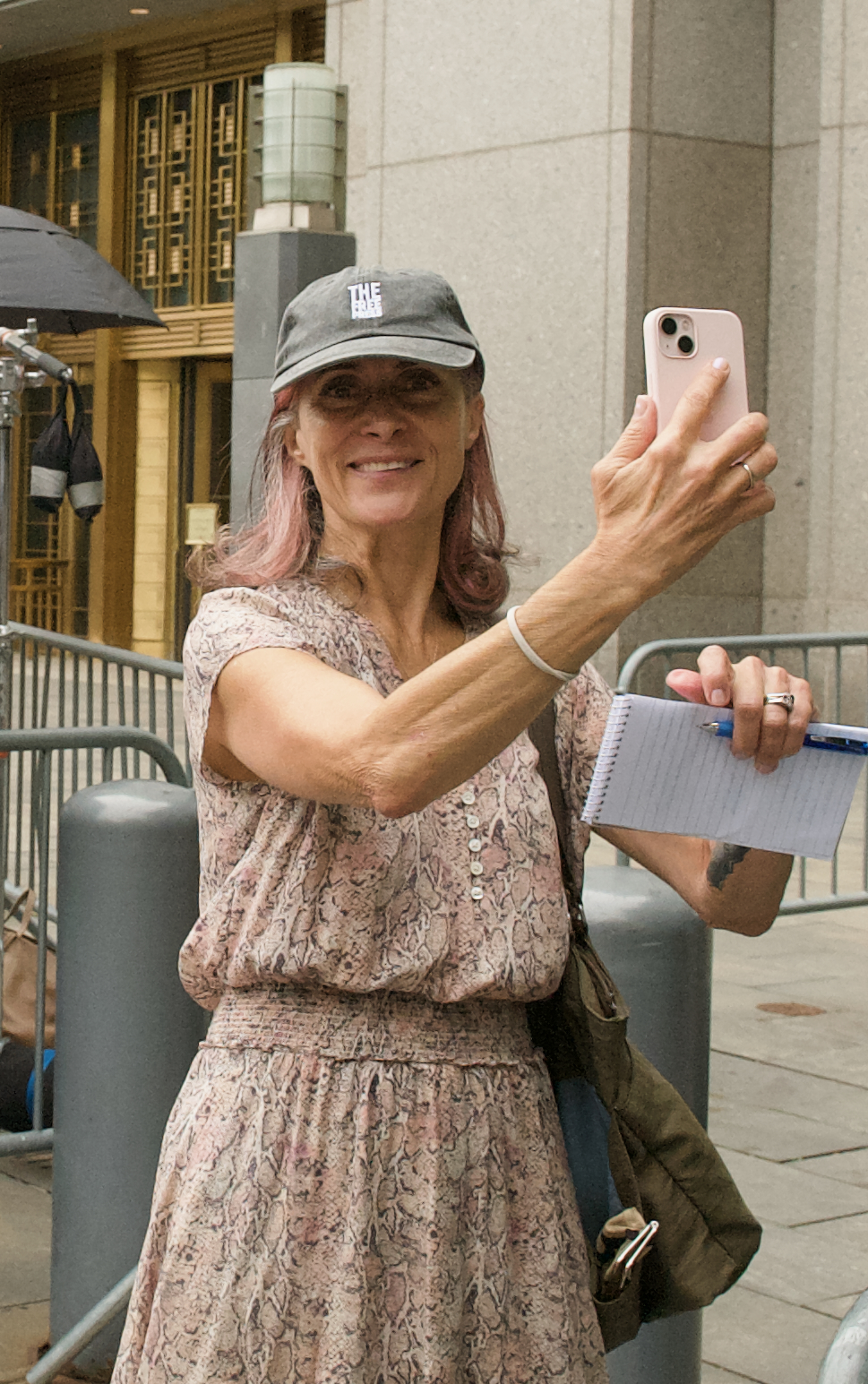
- Rommelmann reporting on the federal prosecution of Eric Adams in 2024
- Education: Wesleyan University (BA); Queens University of Charlotte (MA)
- Occupations: Journalist; Author
- Years active: 1994–present
- Website: nancyrommelmann.com

Nancy Rommelmann is an American journalist, book reviewer, and author.

== Career ==
Rommelmann has worked as a journalist and author since the mid-1990s and has written fiction, nonfiction, and cultural commentary. Her work has appeared in publications including LA Weekly, The Wall Street Journal, and The New York Times.

== Books ==
Forty Bucks and a Dream: Stories from Los Angeles (2024) is a collection of Rommelmann's stories about Los Angeles in the 1990s and 2000s.

To the Bridge: A True Story of Motherhood and Murder (2018) is a nonfiction account of Amanda Stott-Smith, who in May 2009 dropped her two young children from the Sellwood Bridge in Portland, Oregon, into the Willamette River; her four-year-old son died, and her seven-year-old daughter survived.

Destination Gacy (2014) is an e-book account of a 1994 cross-country road trip to visit serial killer John Wayne Gacy shortly before his execution.

Transportation (2013) is a collection of Rommelmann's short stories.

The Queens of Montague Street (2012) is a digital memoir about growing up in Brooklyn Heights in the 1970s.

The Bad Mother (2011) is a novel about street kids in Los Angeles. Reviewing it in Reason, Katherine Mangu-Ward described the novel as following "a cluster of street kids in L.A. as they make catastrophically bad choices," and characterized Rommelmann's storytelling in it and To the Bridge as "equal parts horrifying and lyrical."

Rommelmann's Los Angeles Bar & Nightlife Guide (2001) is a guide to nightlife in Los Angeles.

Everything You Pretend to Know About Food and Are Afraid Someone Will Ask (1998) is a book about food, co-published by Penguin Books.

== #MeNeither ==
Beginning in 2018, Rommelmann and columnist Leah McSweeney started the YouTube series "#MeNeither," discussed media coverage of allegations against several prominent men during the #MeToo movement.

== Personal life ==
Rommelmann and her husband, Din Johnson, have lived in Portland, Oregon since 2004.

In September 2005, Johnson opened a coffee shop, Ristretto Roasters, in Portland's Beaumont-Wilshire neighborhood. The shop grew into a small chain.
