= Los Lonely Boys: Cottonfields and Crossroads =

- Directed by: Hector Galan
- Produced by: Hector Galan; Jose Martinez Jr.
- Cinematography: Gustavo Aguilar
- Edited by: Jose Flores
- Release date: 2006
- Running time: 90 minutes
- Country: United States
- Language: English

Los Lonely Boys: Cottonfields and Crossroads is a documentary feature film by independent filmmaker Hector Galán. The film had its world premiere at the SXSW Film and Music Festival in Austin, Texas in the United States, in 2006. It tells the story of the music group Los Lonely Boys from San Angelo, Texas.

Hector Galán started filming Los Lonely Boys in 2002 while the band was still performing in small venues in Austin and around Texas. The film tells the story of Los Lonely Boys from early childhood to the release of their album and their first Grammy win. The film focuses on Los Lonely Boys' cultural background, family, and musical influences. It follows their journey as they try to make it in the music industry. It also focuses on the Mexican American culture and history of San Angelo, Texas.

The film was also shown at the Los Angeles Latino International Film Festival (LALIFF) in 2006 and at the Turks & Caicos Film and Music Festival in October 2007. It had a limited theatrical run in 2006 and 2007. It was released on DVD in February 2007 by Xenon Pictures.

== DVD track list ==
- Opening
- Cottonfields
- Nashville Dreaming
- Cantinas & Honky Tonks
- Familia
- Crossroads
- San Angelo Show
- Too Many Laters
- The Rise of the Lonely Boys
- Embarking on Tour
- Homecoming
- End Credits
