= Colors Straight Up =

1997 film

- DVD cover
- Directed by: Michèle Ohayon
- Written by: Michèle Ohayon
- Cinematography: Jacek Laskus; Theo van de Sande
- Edited by: Edgar Burcksen
- Production company: Echo Pictures
- Distributed by: Filmakers Library
- Release date: 1997
- Country: United States
- Language: English

Colors Straight Up is a 1997 American documentary film directed by Michèle Ohayon about the non-profit organization Colors United, which teaches drama to inner city youth. The film depicts the creation of a musical called Watts Side Story. It was nominated for an Academy Award for Best Documentary Feature.
