= Cowboy del amor =

- DVD cover
- Directed by: Michèle Ohayon
- Produced by: Michèle Ohayon
- Starring: Ivan Thompson
- Cinematography: Theo van de Sande
- Edited by: Kate Amend
- Music by: Joseph Julián González
- Production company: Emerging Pictures
- Release date: March 2005 (SXSW)
- Running time: 86 minutes
- Country: United States
- Languages: English; Spanish
- Box office: $4,438

Cowboy del amor is a 2005 documentary film directed by Michèle Ohayon.

== Plot ==
Ivan Thompson is a 60-year-old former horse breeder who found his calling and career as The Cowboy Cupid. His business is match making. Specifically, introducing American men who are interested in finding love and marriage to Mexican women intent on the same.

For US$3000, Thompson will escort you to Mexico and upon arrival arrange introductions with eligible ladies. The success rate is high. But before the client is accepted and before a trip to Mexico can be made, the client must first pass Thompson's "smell test".

The film chronicles his attempts to set up three men. The first is a 48-year-old truck driver who lives on a mobile home next to his parents’ house, whom he successfully introduces to a 20-year-old seamstress from Torreón. They marry and have a child. Another client is an American used car dealer who does not hit it off with a Mexican doctor. The last is a toothless veteran who marries a Mexican laundress. Finally Ivan quits the business and decides to go town to town in Mexico to pursue his own quest to find love.

== Critical reception ==
On review aggregator website Rotten Tomatoes, the film holds an approval rating of 70% based on 20 reviews, with an average rating of 6.4/10.

Review aggregator website Metacritic gave the film a 57 out of 100, indicating "mixed or average" reviews.

From Marrit Ingman of The Austin Chronicle:

I've seen a lot of documentaries lately, but this pick from last year's South by Southwest film festival (and winner of the Documentary Feature award) is a shining example of how the format can use character as a prism... The result is a lyrical contrast of two contiguous cultures, worlds apart in their definitions of family and love but brought together by mutual awe and basic human need.

From Elizabeth Weitzman of The New York Daily News:

It's both a compliment and a criticism to say that Michèle Ohayon's scrappy documentary ends much too quickly. Every moment of this story - about America's unlikeliest matchmaker - is fascinating. We just need more of them.

The film was awarded Best Documentary Film at the 2005 South by Southwest Film Festival. The film was nominated for Best Documentary Screenplay from the Writers Guild of America.
