= Made in L.A. (2007 film) =

2007 film by Almudena Carracedo

- Directed by: Almudena Carracedo
- Written by: Almudena Carracedo, Robert Bahar, Lisa Leeman
- Produced by: Robert Bahar, Almudena Carracedo
- Cinematography: Almudena Carracedo
- Edited by: Lisa Leeman; Kim Roberts; Almudena Carracedo
- Music by: Joseph Julian Gonzalez
- Release date: 2007
- Country: United States
- Languages: English; Spanish

Made in L.A. is a 2007 documentary film that tells the story of three Latina immigrants as they wage a battle against their employer, a Los Angeles garment factory. After years of domestic abuse and meager salaries, Lupe Hernandez, Maura Colorado, and María Pineda join together in their struggle for self-empowerment and negotiated working conditions.

Made in L.A. was written, directed, and produced by Almudena Carracedo and was aired as part of PBS's P.O.V. documentary series.
