= Michèle Ohayon =

- Born: Casablanca, Morocco
- Website: micheleohayon.com

Michèle Ohayon (born 1960) is a film director, screenwriter and producer, best known for the Academy Award-nominated feature documentary film, Colors Straight Up (1997), Cowboy del Amor (2005), Steal a Pencil for Me (2007) and Cristina (2016).

Michèle is also a fiction film writer with numerous screenplays developed by major studios such as MGM, FOCUS FILMS and STARZ cable. She has been a guest speaker/lecturer at various schools and colleges, including UCLA, AFI, USC, UVA, Georgetown, Wesleyan, Stanford, Chapman, Kenyon and more. For her body of work, Michèle received twice the Artist's Grant from the Los Angeles Cultural Affairs Department and was recognized for her fiction writing in the Chesterfield Writing Competition.

Michèle is one of the founders of Cinewomen and she is a member of the Academy of Motion Picture Arts and Sciences where she serves on the Academy Executive Committee of the Foreign Films, the Documentary Branch, and the educational/grants committee. She is also a member of the Writers Guild of America, Directors Guild of America and International Documentary Association.

== Biography ==
Michele Ohayon was born in Casablanca, Morocco, and raised in Israel. She graduated from Tel Aviv University (Film and Television), after serving in the Israel Defense Forces.

== Film career ==
In 1984, Ohayon created one of the first dramatic films on the Israeli-Palestinian conflict, Pressure, for which she received the Israeli Best Film Award. She directed the documentary feature It was a Wonderful Life (1987), and was nominated for the Academy Award with Colors Straight Up (1997) for Best Documentary Feature. With Colors Straight Up, she also received the IFP Spirit Award among many other awards. Her film Cowboy del Amor (2005) is WGA and IDA nominated and won both Jury and Audience Awards at the SXSW Festival, as well as Best Documentary at Santa Fe, Durango and Cinefest.

Her next feature documentary Steal a Pencil for Me (2007) was shown at the United Nations and won the Audience Award at Sonoma Film Festival, the Berlinale in 2008 and the YadVashem Chairman Award at the Jerusalem Film Festival. The film was also honored at the Spirit of Anne Frank Awards and nominated for the IDA ABC/Video Source Award 2007.

Her next films S.O.S. - State of Security (2011) premiered at the Berlin Film Festival and Solar Roadways (2012) premiered at the Tribeca Film Festival. In 2013, Ohayon made the tribute film for Angelina Jolie's Governors award, for the Academy of Motion Pictures, narrated by Morgan Freeman, and in 2014 the tribute film for Jean-Claude Carriere's Governors award, narrated by Jeremy Irons, with Irons, Richard Gere, Natalie Portman, Juliette Binoche and Isabelle Huppert.

In 2016, Michèle was a supervising producer on CNN's Believer, hosted by Reza Aslan, and produced the feature documentaries 100 Years (2016) and Power (on-going), which she is also co-directing. Michèle also premiered her new documentary Cristina (2016) at the Palm Springs ShortFest in 2016.

Her most recent film was Strip Down, Rise Up (2021). The feature documentary follows women of all walks of life, all ages and ethnic backgrounds, as they shed trauma, body image shame, sexual abuse and other issues locked in their bodies, and embark on a journey to reclaim themselves. The film also gives a rare window into the world of Pole artistry and expression.

In 2023, she produced the HBO/MAX documentary “The Unbreakable Tatiana Suarez,” She is currently producing the documentaries “Women Are Sacred,” and “The Diamond Approach” both in Post-Production, and developing a feature doc to direct, as well as a short documentary with Revelations Entertainment (Morgan Freeman and Lori McCreary). She served as co-chair of the Executive Committee of the International Feature Films for the 98th Academy Awards and moderated the Academy Museum's panel with the filmmakers nominated for Best International Feature Film.

== Kavana Entertainment ==
Michèle Ohayon is the CEO and co-founder of Kavana Entertainment, based in Los Angeles, with a mission to bridge between Hollywood and the rest of the world. Kavana offers consulting and production services for filmmakers around the world.

== Filmography ==
Documentary film

Year	Title	Director	Producer	Writer
1987	It Was a Wonderful Life	Yes	Yes	No
1997	Colors Straight Up	Yes	Yes	Yes
2005	Cowboy del Amor	Yes	Yes	No
2007	Steal a Pencil For Me	Yes	Yes	Yes
2011	S.O.S./State of Security	Yes	Yes	Yes
2021	Strip Down, Rise Up	Yes	Yes	Yes
2023	The Unbreakable Tatiana Suarez	No	Yes	No

Documentary short

- Cristina (2016)
- Solar Roadways (2012)

Narrative short

- Lahatz (Pressure) (1984)
