= Heaven (Los Lonely Boys song) =

2003 single by Los Lonely Boys

Single by Los Lonely Boys

from the album Los Lonely Boys
- Released: June 2003
- Genre: Rock; pop rock
- Length: 3:47
- Label: Epic
- Songwriters: Henry Garza; Jojo Garza; Ringo Garza
- Producer: John Porter

Los Lonely Boys singles chronology
"Real Emotions" (2003)	"Heaven" (2003)	"More Than Love" (2004)

Music video
- "Heaven" on YouTube

"Heaven" is a song by American rock band Los Lonely Boys, released as their debut single. The song was written by brothers Henry, Jojo and Ringo Garza, who comprise the foundation of the band, and it appears on their first studio album, Los Lonely Boys. "Heaven" was serviced to US triple-A radio in June 2003 and impacted mainstream radio in 2004. The song eventually topped the US and Canadian adult contemporary charts and peaked at number 16 on the US Billboard Hot 100.

== Release and reception ==
In the United States, "Heaven" was serviced to triple-A radio in June 2003 and to hot adult contemporary radio on January 26, 2004. The song reached the top 40 on the US Billboard Hot 100 chart, peaking at 16 in August 2004. Later that year, the song began a 16-week run at number one on the Billboard Adult Contemporary chart in October. It was also a minor hit on country radio, where it peaked at number 46.

AllMusic reviewer Thom Jurek describes the song as "infectious" and draws comparisons to the music of Freddie King, Stevie Ray Vaughan and Los Lobos. He states that "Heaven" is "a single in the old sense of the word: killer hook, easy groove, a slippery but unmistakable bridge with a beautiful vocal to boot -- all coming in under four minutes."

== Awards ==
The success of "Heaven" led to two Grammy Award nominations and one win for the band at the 47th Annual Grammy Awards, held in early 2005. The song won in the category Best Pop Performance by a Duo or Group with Vocal, while Los Lonely Boys were nominated in the category Best New Artist, losing out to Maroon 5.

== Track listing ==
US and UK CD single

1. "Heaven" (album version)
2. "Heaven" (live acoustic version)

== Charts ==
=== Weekly charts ===
Chart (2004–2005)	Peak position
Australia (ARIA)	87
Canada (Nielsen SoundScan)	16
Canada AC Top 30 (Radio & Records)	1
Canada Hot AC Top 30 (Radio & Records)	5
New Zealand (Recorded Music NZ)	26
Romania (Romanian Top 100)	48
US Billboard Hot 100	16
US Adult Contemporary (Billboard)	1
US Adult Top 40 (Billboard)	2
US Hot Country Singles & Tracks (Billboard)	46
US Mainstream Top 40 (Billboard)	11
US Triple-A (Billboard)	6

=== Year-end charts ===
Chart (2003)	Position
US Triple-A (Billboard)	40

Chart (2004)	Position
US Billboard Hot 100	37
US Adult Contemporary (Billboard)	15
US Adult Top 40 (Billboard)	5
US Mainstream Top 40 (Billboard)	44
US Triple-A (Billboard)	3

Chart (2005)	Position
US Adult Contemporary (Billboard)	2
US Adult Top 40 (Billboard)	43

== Certifications ==
Region	Certification	Certified units/sales
New Zealand (RMNZ)	Platinum	30,000^{‡}
United States (RIAA)	Gold	500,000^{*}
^{*} Sales figures based on certification alone.^{‡} Sales+streaming figures based on certification alone.

== Release history ==
Region	Date	Format(s)	Label(s)	Ref.
United States	June 2003	Triple-A radio	Epic	
United States	January 26, 2004	Hot adult contemporary radio	Epic	
Australia	July 19, 2004	CD	Epic	

== In popular culture ==
- In late 2004, the song was covered by the Christian Latin rock band Salvador for their album: So Natural. The cover received heavy radio play on Christian radio.
- The song is featured in the 2008 Nintendo DS game Guitar Hero: On Tour with a completely different guitar track.
- Bo Bice performed "Heaven" as part of the fourth season of American Idol in May 2005, which led to a 77% increase in sales for Los Lonely Boys' self-titled album the week following this performance.
- The song is featured in the TNT television show Saving Grace, at the end of the pilot episode "In the Beginning".
- The song was used as bumper music each day for The Laura Ingraham Show.

== See also ==
- List of Billboard Adult Contemporary number ones of 2004 and 2005 (U.S).
