= Los Lonely Boys =

American musical group

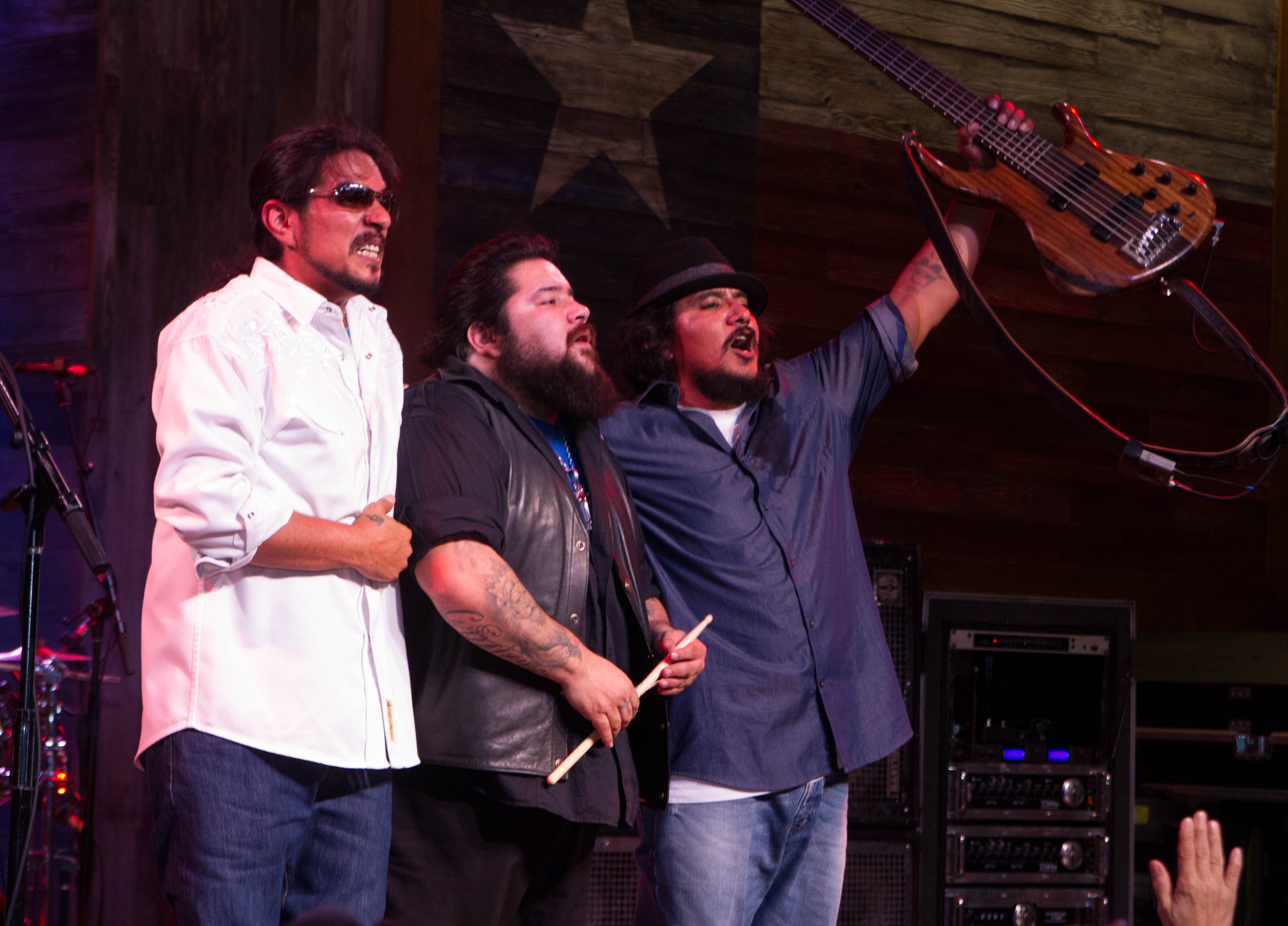
- Los Lonely Boys in 2017; from left to right: Henry Garza, Ringo Garza, and Jojo Garza Sr.

Background information
- Origin: San Angelo, Texas, U.S.
- Genre: Rock
- Years active: 1996–2019; 2022–present
- Labels: Playing In Traffic; Epic
- Members: Henry Garza; Jojo Garza; Ringo Garza
- Website: www.loslonelyboys.com

Los Lonely Boys are an American rock band from San Angelo, Texas. They play a style of music they call "Texican Rock n' Roll", combining elements of rock and roll, Texas blues, brown-eyed soul, country, and Tejano music.

The band consists of three brothers: Henry (guitar, vocals), Jojo (bass guitar, vocals), and Ringo (drums, vocals) Garza Sr. They follow the tradition of their father, Enrique Garza, who formed a band with his brothers called the Falcones. The Falcones played conjunto music in South Texas during the 1970s and 1980s. The debut single by Los Lonely Boys, "Heaven", was a number-one hit on the Billboard adult contemporary chart and reached the top 40 on the Billboard Hot 100 in 2004. In 2009, they signed to an Austin-based indie label, Playing in Traffic Records, and released an EP, 1969, and three albums under their LonelyTone imprint, Keep On Giving: Acoustic Live!, Rockpango, and their newest release, Revelation.

== Musical career ==
The three brothers were discovered by a local club owner, John R. Steele, who hired them as his house band. When they started to attract attention in San Angelo they hired Mr. Steele as a road manager and they went on the road, finally ending up in Nashville where they landed a recording contract in the 1990s. After moving back to their home state of Texas, they recorded an album in 2003 in Austin. Produced by John Porter at Willie Nelson's Pedernales Recording Studio. The album was initially released by Or Music and later acquired by Epic Records for distribution in March 2004.

The group's first single from the album "Heaven", reached number one on the Adult Contemporary chart, and number 16 on the Billboard Hot 100, and number 11 at top 40. "Heaven" was featured in Guitar Hero: On Tour. In 2005, the song won a Grammy Award for Best Pop Performance by a Duo or Group with Vocal. Other songs nominated for Grammys include "More Than Love" and "Onda", both in 2006.

In 2005, the group recorded "I Don't Wanna Lose Your Love" again produced by John Porter with Carlos Santana for the Santana album All That I Am. In June of that year, the group appeared in an episode of CMT's "Crossroads" show with country music legend Ronnie Milsap. Their 2006 album, Sacred, features the song "Outlaws". In a "closing of the circle", Enrique Garza Sr. sings the verse about the "missing outlaws, just like me". Willie Nelson, who is credited on the 2004 album, also provided a verse which makes reference to his hit "On the Road Again".

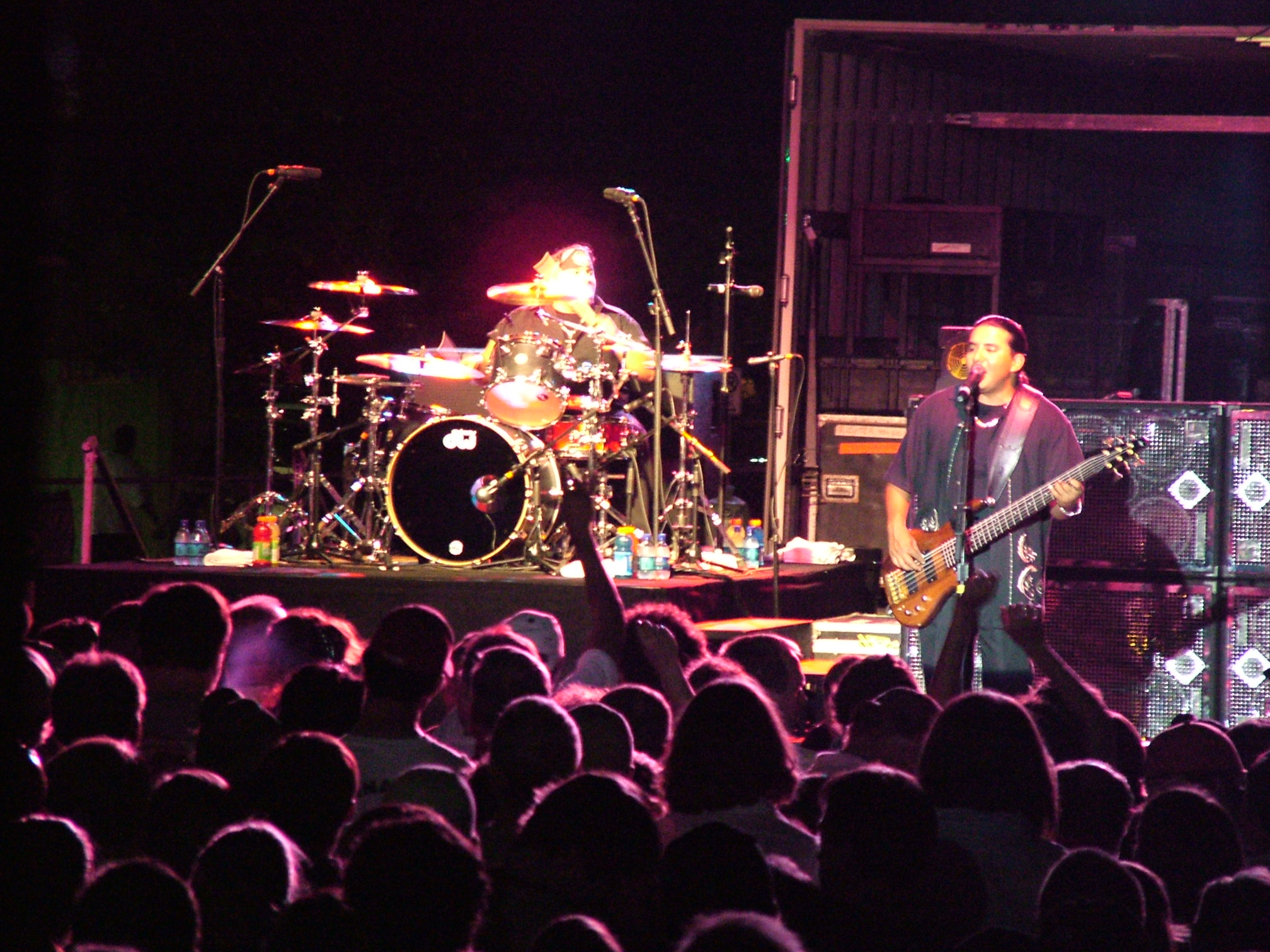
Los Lonely Boys in 2006

In 2007, Los Lonely Boys participated in Amnesty International's Make Some Noise project. Their cover of John Lennon's "Whatever Gets You thru the Night" is the second single from the Instant Karma: The Amnesty International Campaign to Save Darfur. The song was released on iTunes on April 17, with the entire album available on June 12 courtesy of Warner Bros. Records. "Whatever Gets You thru the Night" is noteworthy as John Lennon's only US number-one solo single while he was alive.

Their third studio album, Forgiven, was released on July 1, 2008. The album was recorded at East Side Stages in Austin and was produced by Steve Jordan. On October 23, 2008, Los Lonely Boys sang the national anthem to open game two of the 2008 World Series in St. Petersburg, Florida.

In March 2009, Los Lonely Boys left Sony/Epic and signed with Austin-based Playing In Traffic Records. In March 2010, the group was awarded "Best Rock Band" in the Austin Music Awards.

The trio released a tribute EP titled "1969" on October 13, 2009, paying homage to the 40th anniversary of the titular year with covers of Santana's "Evil Ways", The Doors' "Roadhouse Blues", Blind Faith's version of Buddy Holly's "Well All Right", The Beatles' "She Came in Through the Bathroom Window", and Tony Joe White's "Polk Salad Annie". The EP was produced by Andy Johns and marked the first release on their new label.

Following their 2009-2010 tour, which included roughly 200 shows seen by over 350,000 fans, Los Lonely Boys headed back to the studio to complete their fourth full-length studio album. It was announced on January 14, 2011, that the new album, entitled Rockpango (a Spanglish word that means "rock party"), would be released on March 29. Rockpango, which features 11 original tracks, marks the first full-length studio album released by the band on their LonelyTone imprint for Playing in Traffic Records. A deluxe edition of the album will include three bonus songs, a behind-the-scenes video, and a fold-out poster of the cover art.

In early 2014, Los Lonely Boys released their fifth studio album, Revelation. The album represents new territory for the Boys, with the conjunto touches on "Blame It On Love" and the reggae groove of "Give a Little More", among many other new sonic elements.

In 2016, the band recorded a cover version of John Fogerty's "Born on the Bayou", to be included in the project Quiero Creedence. This album, scheduled for July 2016 release, is a tribute to Creedence Clearwater Revival by various Latin recording artists.

In October 2019, Los Lonely Boys canceled all upcoming performances after Jojo Garza announced he was leaving the group, causing the band to take a temporary hiatus.

On April 21, 2022, with Jojo having allegedly changed his mind after two years, Los Lonely Boys announced they were joining The Who on some tour dates in Dallas, Houston, and Oklahoma City. They announced alongside it that they had officially reunited, with new music and additional shows coming soon.

== Members ==
- Henry Garza (b. May 14, 1978) – vocals, guitar
- Jojo Garza (b. June 4, 1980) – bass guitar, vocals
- Ringo Garza Sr. (b. November 29, 1981) – drums, percussion, vocals

== Supporting musicians ==
- Reese Wynans (2004) – organ, keyboards, piano
- Michael Ramos (2006) – organ, keyboards, piano, vocals
- Carmelo Torres (2008, 2009) – percussion

== Discography ==
- Los Lonely Boys (1997)
- Teenage Blues (1998)
- Los Lonely Boys (2004)
- Sacred (2006)
- Forgiven (2008)
- Christmas Spirit (2008)
- Rockpango (2011)
- Revelation (2014)
- Resurrection (2024)

== See also ==
- Music of Texas
- Music of Austin
