= Mahmoud Mabsout =

- Born: Mahmoud Mabsout (Arabic: محمود مبسوط); 1941; Tripoli, Lebanon
- Died: July 25, 2011 (aged 69–70)
- Occupation: Actor
- Years active: 1955–2011

Mahmoud Mabsout (Arabic: محمود مبسوط), also known by the character Fehmen (Arabic: فهمان) (1941 – 25 July 2011) was a Lebanese actor.

== Biography ==
Mahmoud was born in 1941 in Tripoli, North Lebanon. He was not good at school, as he said in an interview. He failed first grade six times, and when he was 12 years old, the principal of his school told his father "your son is not good for school." Meanwhile, Mahmoud spent his time acting sketches that he invented with his friends.

Mahmoud formed with his friends the "Drabzin Agha" troupe, and made some sketches that made it to festival of the «Ecole des Freres» (school). His father didn't want him to act, and was reported to beat Mahmoud in order to stop him from acting. The father locked his son to prohibit him from going out because acting was a «forbidden art» in his point of view. Mahmoud escaped using a rope tied to the balcony.

At the age of sixteen, his father sent him to Africa to work with his brothers. He worked with them during the day, but spent nights playing the «Tarneeb» card game. During one of those games, he met a man named "Asmarani", who was influential in the Arab community in Ghana. "Asmarani" supported him as he formed a troupe with a group of amateurs which he met in nightclubs. They presented plays at homes of Lebanese people around the country. Mahmoud again was beaten, this time by his two brothers. They also imprisoned him at home, but the «Asmarani» intervened and asked and threatened them, not to block the rising artist's carrier. His brothers sent him back to Lebanon.

In Lebanon, he joined the comedy troupe of "Abou Salim", led by Salah Tizani, who is also from Tripoli. The troupe worked at "Channel 7" of Tele Liban, performing "live" sketches, after only a few months from its opening, marking the golden era of Tele-Liban. In 1962, they created the "Abou Salim el Tabel" troupe on which Mahmoud assumed the recurring character of Fehmen.

== Filmography ==
Beside his work in Tele-Liban, Mahmoud Starred in around 25 plays and 33 Films. He worked with many directors such as Muhammad Salman, Samir El Ghosayni, Ziad Doueiry, Atef Al Tayeb, Hani Tamba, Philip Aractanji, Samir Habchi, Borhane Alaouié.

Year	Title	Role	Notes	Remarks
1967	Safarbarlek		Film	Rahbani Brothers
1971	Bint el Hareth	Ezzo	Film	Rahbani Brothers
1972	Min yawm la yawm		Television Series	Rahbani Brothers
1995	West Beirut	Baker	Film	
2005	After Shave	Abou Milad	Short film	
2005	Bosta	Bus driver	Film	
2007	Khalass	Bus driver	Film	

== Quotes ==
- Life's a joke. It's true it may be heavy sometimes, but still there is always a chance to rejoice with no cost.
