= Qui vive (2002 film) =

- Theatrical release poster
- Directed by: Frans Weisz
- Screenplay by: Judith Herzberg
- Based on: Rijgdraad by Judith Herzberg
- Produced by: Hans de Weers
- Starring: Kitty Courbois; Peter Oosthoek; Catherine ten Bruggencate; Pierre Bokma; Rijk de Gooyer
- Cinematography: Rutger Storm
- Edited by: Michiel Reichwein
- Music by: Wim Mertens
- Production companies: Egmond Film and Television; NPS
- Distributed by: United International Pictures
- Release date: 14 February 2002
- Running time: 91 minutes
- Country: Netherlands
- Language: Dutch

Qui vive is a 2002 film directed by Frans Weisz and written by Judith Herzberg, based on his 1995 play Rijgdraad. The film is a sequel to the 1989 film Leedvermaak, featuring some of the same characters from that film.

The film was released in the Netherlands on 14 February 2002 by United International Pictures.

== Cast ==
- Kitty Courbois as Ada
- Pierre Bokma as Nico
- Peter Oosthoek as
- Catherine ten Bruggencate as Lea
- Rijk de Gooyer as Zwart
