= Kitty Courbois =

Dutch actress (1937–2017)

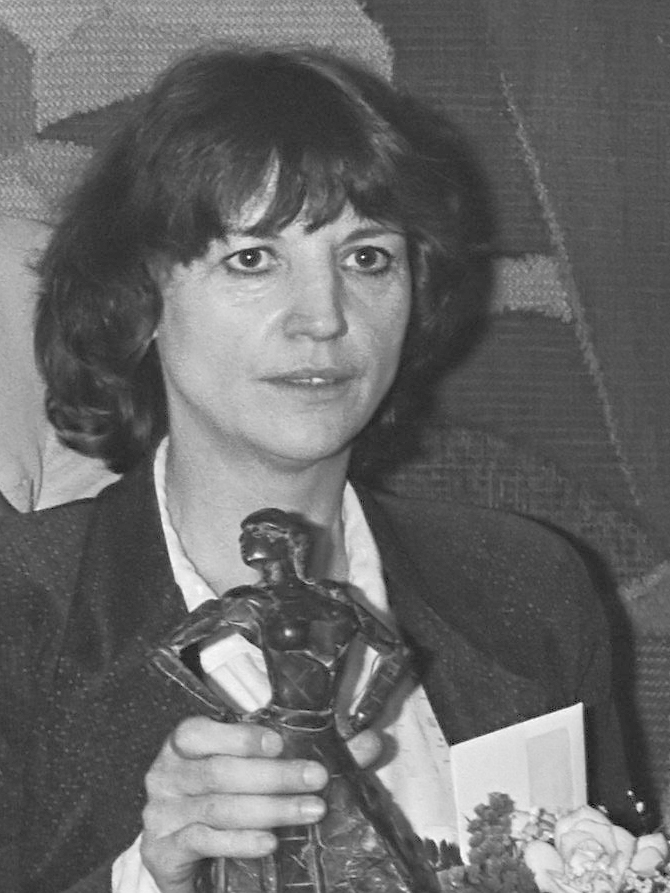
- Kitty Courbois (1980)
- Born: 13 July 1937; Nijmegen, Netherlands
- Died: 11 March 2017 (aged 79); Amsterdam, Netherlands
- Occupation: Actress
- Years active: 1958–2017
- Relatives: Pierre Courbois (brother)

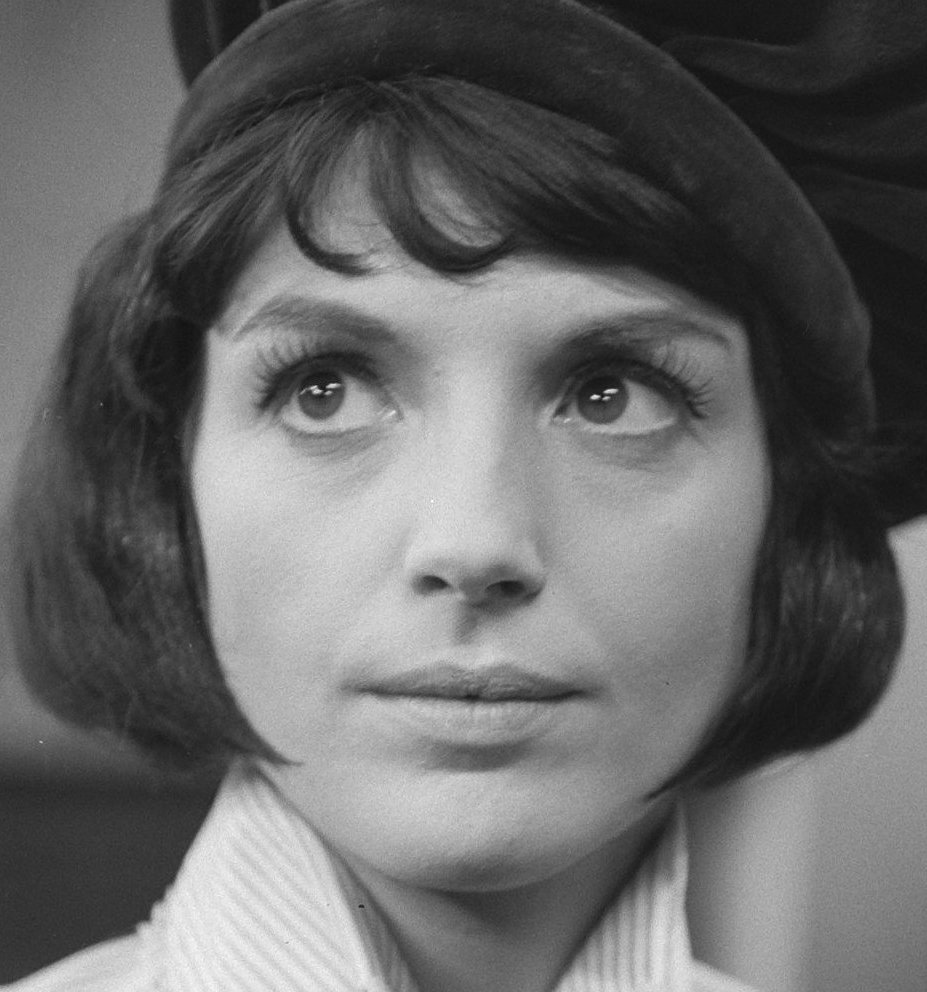
As a TV actor in De schaduw van een revolverman, 1964

Catharina Anna Petronella Antonia "Kitty" Courbois (13 July 1937 – 11 March 2017) was a Dutch actress. In 2010 she was awarded the Medal of Merit.

== Career ==
Kitty Courbois was born into a wigmaker family in Nijmegen, Netherlands. She has six brothers and sisters. Her youngest brother is jazz musician Pierre Courbois.

Her first breakthrough role came in 1961 with a restaging of Tennessee Williams's The Rose Tattoo, directed by Ko van Dijk. Her debut as Rosa Delle Rose was met a positive reception and she was regarded as a talented actor with a bright future.

Courbois appeared in her first theatrical film in the Helden in een schommelstoel segment of the Italian anthology film, Gli eroi di ieri… oggi… domani, by fellow Dutch creatives, director Frans Weisz and writer Remco Campert. This would mark her first collaboration with Weisz. A take on the spaghetti Western, It follows two American cowgirls that end up in Rome and began a love affair with a twist singer, one integrated herself in Italy and one remains firmly American, Courbios played the latter character. It was released in 1964.

In 1969, Courbois starred in the TROS television programme, Kitty in Flipperland also known as Anno Domini '69 alongside Ramses Shaffy, the pop group Zen and the cartoonist of Lucky Luke among others. Courbois was the creative lead on the project, it was based her own ideas which was built around gambling and slot machines which considered herself an enthusiast of. The show ran into production problems and would court controversy. On February 6, during filming that involved fireworks, Courbois sustained minor burns and was brought to a local hospital for treatment. She would resume production afterwards. The programme was cancelled at first by TROS leadership citing the reasons of "the quality not reaching reasonable standards" and "to protect Kitty Courbois". In response, producer Rijk de Gooyer and director Jop Pannekoek gave their notices. Courbois was surprised by the rejection. The programme was ultimately broadcast on its original date of February 21. It was met a negative response by audiences.

She had a supporting role in Paul Verhoeven's Flesh and Blood. In it she was part of a mercenary group under the lead of Rutger Hauer's character. For the role she took horse riding lessons under the guidance of Oeg van den Berg.

== Filmography ==
Year	Title	Role	Notes
1964	Spuit Elf	Juli, het dienstmeisje	
1964	Helden in een schommelstoel	Cowgirl	
1966	A Gangstergirl	Gangstermeisje	
1967	Liefdesbekentenissen	Marina	
1972	VD	Rooie Mien	
1974	Mariken van Nieumeghen		Voice
1975	Kind van de zon	Girl	
1975	De laatste trein	Coba	
1977	The Debut	Anne Sanders	
1979	Twee vrouwen	Sylvia's mother	
1979	Tiro	Lea Bovenlander	
1980	Spetters	Doctor	
1980	Vrijdag	Jeanne	
1981	Twee vorstinnen en een vorst	Moeder / Mother	
1983	An Bloem	An Bloem	
1983	De mannetjesmaker	Olga Müller	
1985	Het bittere kruid	Moeder Meijer	
1985	Flesh and Blood	Anna	
1985	In het voorbijgaan		
1986	Op hoop van zegen	Kniertje	
1989	Leedvermaak	Ada	
1990	Vincent & Theo	Anna Van Gogh	Uncredited
1993	Seventh Heaven	Hotelhoudster	
1993	Belle van Zuylen – Madame de Charrière	Mrs. Saurin	
1993	De tussentijd	Sophie Cambach	
1994	Old Tongues	Sitske Sake	
1995	Last Call	Berta Bouwmeester	
1998	Scratches in the Table	Oma	
1999	Duinzicht boven		
2000	Cross Fate		
2001	Monte Carlo	Weduwe van Tuyl van Serooskerken	
2001	Qui vive	Ada	
2003	Polleke		Uncredited
2005	Het mysterie van de sardine	Victoria Koenen	
2006	Zeven zonden		
2007	Love is All	Actrice op crematie	
2009	Happy End	Ada	
2010	Vlees	Mother Inspector Mann	
2012	Brammetje Baas	Moeder Vis	
2012	Ballast	Didi	
2014	Hartenstraat	Bep	
2016	De Held	Iezebel Silverstein	(final film role)
