= Qui vive =

Qui vive may refer to:

- USS Qui Vive, a United States Navy patrol vessel
- Qui vive (2002 film), a film directed by Frans Weisz
- Insecure (film) (French: Qui vive), a 2014 French drama film
