= Lionel Wickrama =

Sri Lankan actor (1946–2023)

- ලයනල් වික්‍රම
- Born: 12 January 1946; Kandy, British Ceylon
- Died: 17 December 2023 (aged 77); Kandy, Sri Lanka
- Education: St. Anthony's College, Kandy
- Occupations: Actor, Production Executive, film producer, location manager
- Years active: 1962–2016
- Spouse: Swarna Wickrama

Lionel Wickrama (12 January 1946 – 17 December 2023) was a Sri Lankan film, theatre and television actor. He is most notable for the role ""Arty Hamu" played in the television drama Batti and films Karumakkarayo, Deveni Warama, and Sakkarang.

== Personal life ==
After school days, he worked as a Senior Technical Officer at Highways Department.

Lionel Wickrama was married to Swarna Wickrama, and the couple had two sons: Tharaka Sanjey Wickrama and Yasiru Dananjey Wickrama.

=== Illness and death ===
In 2021, Wickrama was admitted to the hospital with cardiac arrest. He died on 16 December 2023, at the age of 77. His remains were laid to rest on 17 December at Murutalawa, Kandy for public honors. His final rites were performed at Pirimathalawa Giragama Public Cemetery on 18 December 2023.

== Career ==
While working in the Highways Department, Wickrama worked with the actor Somasiri Dehipitiya. Under his guidance, Wickrama made his maiden cinema appearance in the film Karumakkarayo directed by Tissa Abeysekara in 1980 where he played the role "Baby Mahaththaya". Then he was introduced to popular actor Gamini Fonseka and got the opportunity to act in the 1981 film Sagarayak Maeda and then in 1982 film Sakvithi Suwaya, both directed by Fonseka. During this period, he met renowned filmmaker Dharmasena Pathiraja and became a close friend.

Apart from acting, he also worked as the Production Executive, film producer and location manager. Even though he co-produced the feature film Shelton Saha Kanthi of Pathiraja, the film was not screened.

In television, he acted in more than 200 serials particularly in elderly evil characters. Along with Pathiraja, he produced and acted in the serial Gangulen Egodata which marked his first television role. The serial was made as the first television serial of Sri Lanka, but televised as the fourth serial. Some of his popular television serials include: Batti, Ella Laga Walawwa, and Sepalika. In the serial Batti, he played the harsh stubborn elderly character "Arty Hamu", which became very popular. Initially the role was set to end with 20 episodes, but later expanded to 400 episodes due to huge popularity.

Wickrama also played another popular role "Dissanayaka Hamu" in the serial Sepalika in 2010 and as "Arthur Hamu" in the serial Ella Laga Walawwa in 1988. In 2016, he played the role as "forest monk" in a serial.

== Filmography ==
=== Film ===
Year	Film	Role	Ref.
1980	Karumakkarayo	Baby Mahaththaya	
1981	Soldadu Unnehe		
1981	Sagarayak Meda	Prison Doctor	
1982	Sakvithi Suwaya	Draftsman	
1985	Karadiya Walalla		
2000	Sanda Yahanata		
2001	Mathu Yam Dawasa		
2015	Sakkarang		
2017	Deveni Warama		
2019	Sangili	Ralahamy	
TBD	Wasdandu Rawaya		
TBD	Waasuki		

=== Selected television serials ===
- Alu Baduna
- Batti
- Boradiya Kandura
- Ella Langa Walawwa
- Gangulen Egodata
- Himi Nethi Wasanthaya
- Hiru Thaniwela ( Hiru TV )
- Kadulla
- Kampitha Vil
- Nenala
- Pawena Yakada
- Pini Aga Pulingu
- Reedi Tharaka
- Sepalika
- Sillara Kasi
- Urumayaka Aragalaya
