= Krhanice =

- Municipality
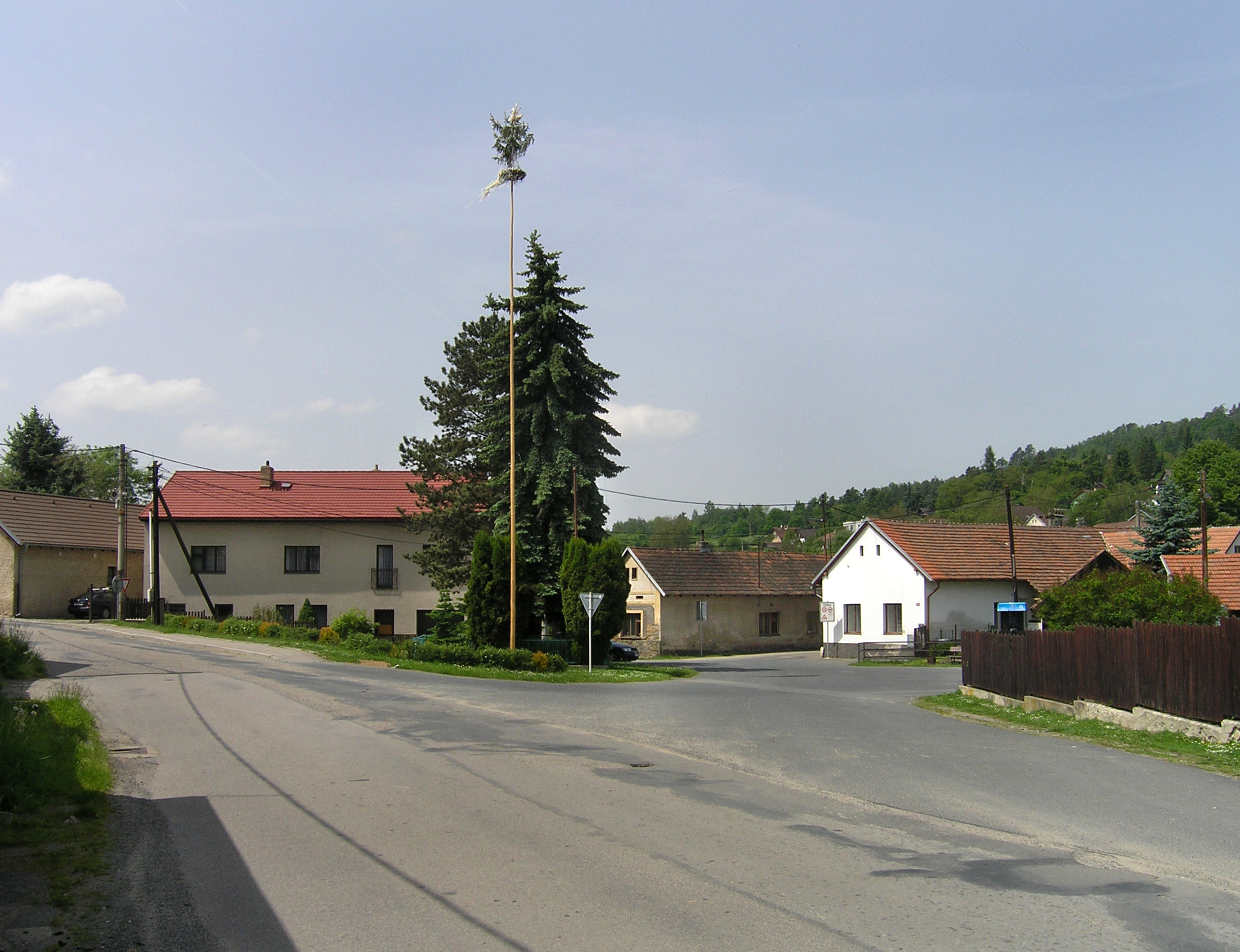
- Centre of Krhanice

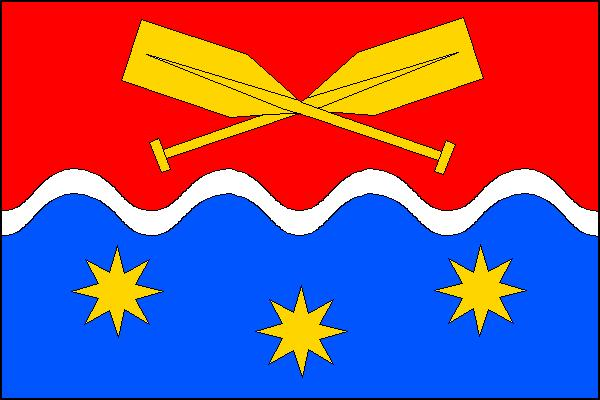
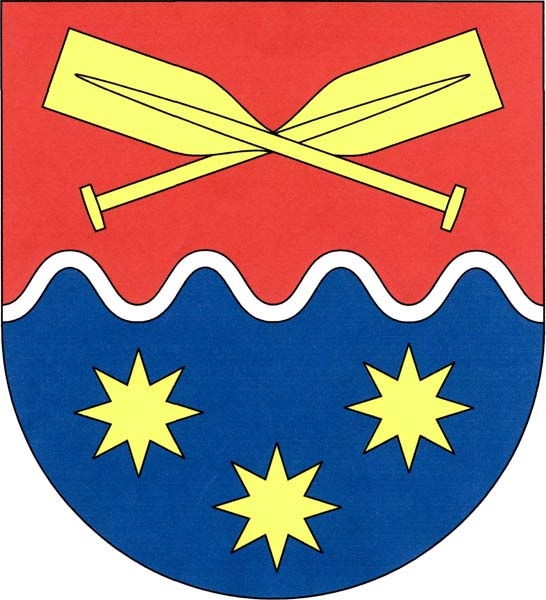
- Flag Coat of arms

- Location in the Czech Republic
- Coordinates: 49°51′22″N 14°33′27″E
- Country: Czech Republic
- Region: Central Bohemian
- District: Benešov
- First mentioned: 1360

Area
  - Total: 13.45 km^{2} (5.19 sq mi)
- Elevation: 276 m (906 ft)

Population (2026-01-01)
  - Total: 1,141
  - Density: 84.83/km^{2} (219.7/sq mi)
- Time zone: UTC+1 (CET)
  - Summer (DST): UTC+2 (CEST)
- Postal codes: 257 41, 257 42
- Website: www.obeckrhanice.cz

Krhanice is a municipality and village in Benešov District in the Central Bohemian Region of the Czech Republic. It has about 1,100 inhabitants.

== Administrative division ==
Krhanice consists of three municipal parts (in brackets population according to the 2021 census):

- Krhanice (828)
- Dolní Požáry (60)
- Prosečnice (143)

== Etymology ==
The initial name of Krhanice was Karhanice. The name was derived from the surname Karhan, meaning "the village of Karhan's people". The name Krhanice has been used since the mid-15th century.

== Geography ==
Krhanice is located about 12 kilometres (7 mi) northwest of Benešov and 20 km (12 mi) south of Prague. It lies in the Benešov Uplands. The highest point is the hill Grybla at 514 m (1,686 ft) above sea level. The municipality is situated on the right bank of the Sázava River.

== History ==
The first written mention of Krhanice is from 1228, when the Ostrov Monastery in Davle owned half of the village. The second part probably belonged to the Zbořený Kostelec estate.

== Demographics ==
Historical population

Year	Pop.	±%
1869	419	—
1880	459	+9.5%
1890	545	+18.7%
1900	660	+21.1%
1910	705	+6.8%

Year	Pop.	±%
1921	661	−6.2%
1930	1,204	+82.1%
1950	1,146	−4.8%
1961	905	−21.0%
1970	940	+3.9%

Year	Pop.	±%
1980	857	−8.8%
1991	728	−15.1%
2001	782	+7.4%
2011	918	+17.4%
2021	1,031	+12.3%

Source: Censuses

== Transport ==
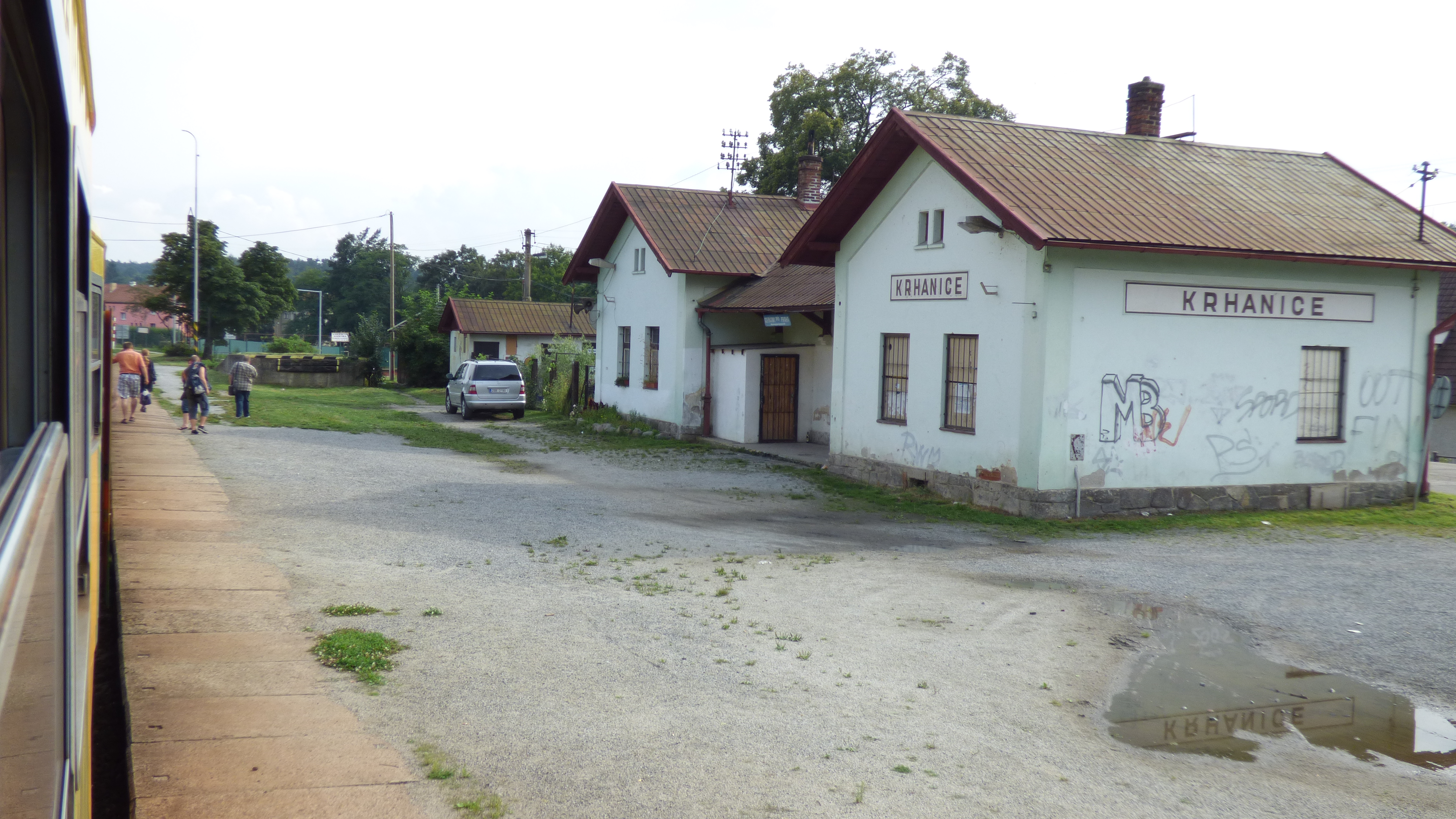
Train station

Krhanice is located on the railway line Prague–Čerčany.

== Sights ==
There are no significant landmarks. The only cultural monuments are a niche chapel of Saint Joseph from the second half of the 18th century, and a homestead from 1813.

== Notable people ==
- Jiří Hájek (1913–1993), politician and diplomat
- Otakar Brousek Sr. (1924–2014), actor
