= Mathu Yam Dawasa =

Mathu Yam Dawasa මතුයම් දවස
- Directed by: Dharmasena Pathiraja
- Written by: Dharmasena Pathiraja
- Produced by: Dharmasena Pathiraja
- Starring: Saumya Liyanage; Jayani Senanayake; Wasantha Moragoda
- Cinematography: Lal Wickremaarachchi
- Edited by: Elmo Haliday
- Music by: Premasiri Kemadasa
- Distributed by: CEL Theaters
- Release dates: 23 November 2001 (Sri Lanka); 22 April 2002 (Singapore)
- Running time: 123 minutes
- Country: Sri Lanka
- Language: Sinhala

Mathu Yam Dawasa (Some Day in the Future) (Sinhala: මතුයම් දවස) is a 2001 Sri Lankan Sinhala crime drama film directed and produced by Dharmasena Pathiraja. It stars Saumya Liyanage and Wasantha Moragoda in lead roles along with Jayani Senanayake and Radha De Mel. Music composed by Premasiri Kemadasa. It is the 1165th Sri Lankan film in the Sinhala cinema.

The film also introduces Rukshana Miskin, Jayani Senanayake and D.B. Gangodathenna to the silver screen. The world premier of the film was held at Singapore International Film Festival, 2002. It also entered 4th Cinefan Festival, New Delhi, 2002 as Sri Lankan selection. The film was also selected to ‘Asiatica Film Mediate" in Rome, Italy to represent Sri Lanka.

== Cast ==
- Saumya Liyanage as Dhammika
- Wasantha Moragoda as Lionel
- Jayani Senanayake
- Radha De Mel
- D.B. Gangodathenna
- Bandula Vithanage
- Rukshana Miskin
- Mahinda Basnayake
- Lionel Wickrama
- Sarath Dikkumbura
- Kapila Sigera
- Layanal Wikramasinghe
- Shanthi Bhanusha
