= My Brother Has a Cute Brother =

1975 film

- Directed by: Stanislav Strnad
- Written by: Václav Borovička; František Vlček
- Starring: Libuše Šafránková
- Cinematography: Jan Novák
- Release date: July 1975
- Running time: 94 minutes
- Country: Czechoslovakia
- Language: Czech

My Brother Has a Cute Brother (Czech: Můj brácha má prima bráchu) is a 1975 Czech comedy film directed by Stanislav Strnad. It was entered into the 9th Moscow International Film Festival where it won a Silver Prize.

== Cast ==
- Libuše Šafránková as Zuzana
- Jan Hrušínský as Honza
- Roman Čada as Martin
- Ivana Maříková as Pavlínka
- Slávka Budínová as Pavelková
- Josef Bláha as Pavelka
- Blažena Holisová as Vránová
- Vladimír Menšík as Vrána
- Zdeněk Řehoř as Dr. Navrátil
- Otakar Brousek Sr. as Colonel
