= Otakar Brousek Sr. =

Czech actor and voice actor

Otakar Brousek
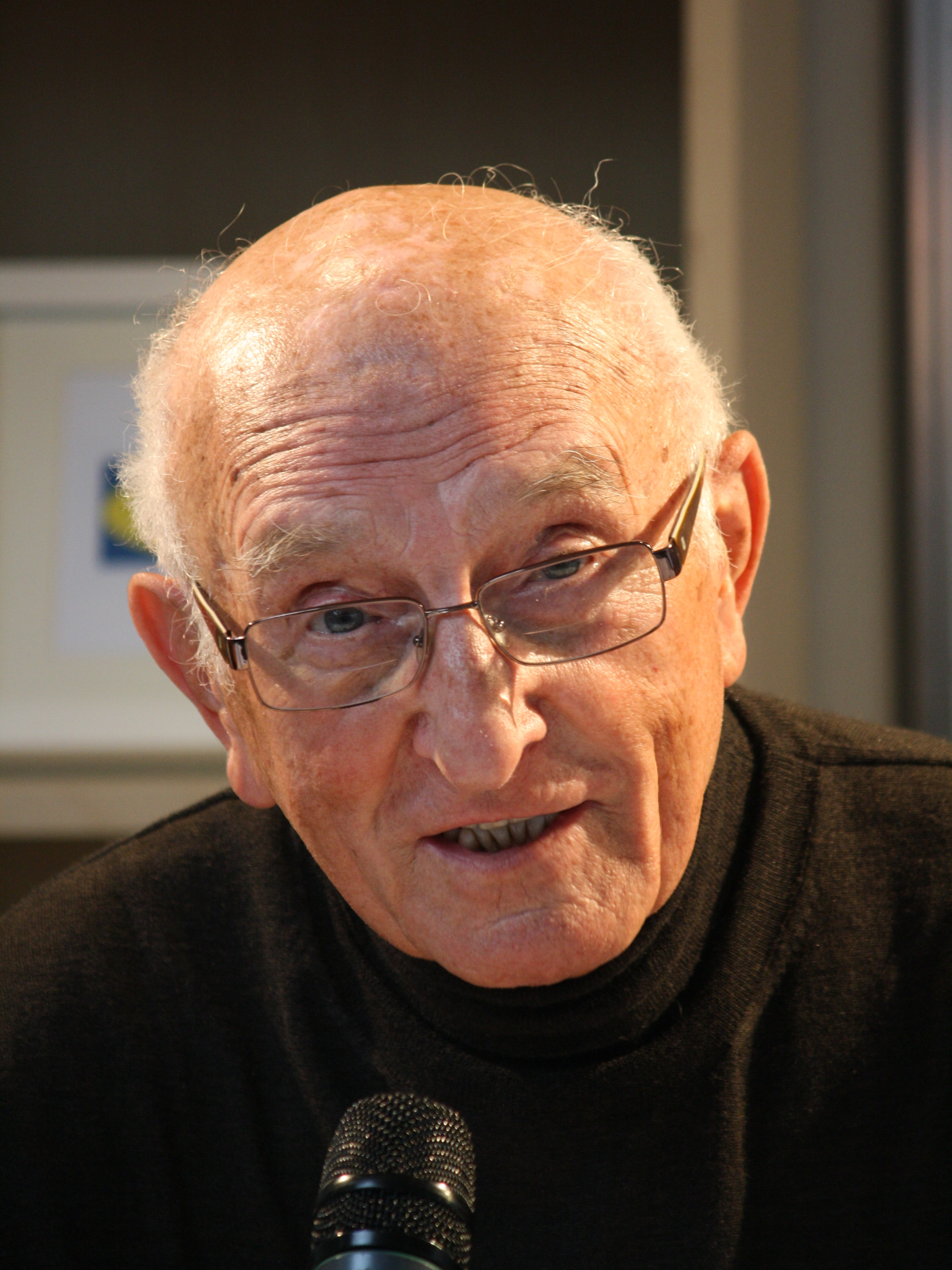
- Brousek in May 2011
- Born: 28 September 1924; Krhanice, Czechoslovakia
- Died: 14 March 2014 (aged 89); Prague, Czech Republic
- Occupation: Actor
- Years active: 1949–2013

Otakar Brousek (28 September 1924 in Krhanice – 14 March 2014) was a Czech actor and voice actor. He appeared primarily in stage productions. He also appeared in around forty films, including Andělská tvář (2002), Svatby pana Voka (1970), Můj brácha má prima bráchu (1975) and the television series F. L. Věk (1971).

== Death ==
Brousek died on 14 March 2014 in Prague, aged 89. He was survived by his children, actors Otakar Brousek Jr. and Jaroslava Brousková.
