= Allpakallpa =

1975 film

- Directed by: Bernardo Arias
- Written by: Hernán Velarde Vargas
- Starring: Zully Azurin
- Cinematography: Eulogio Nishiyama
- Release date: July 1975
- Running time: 103 minutes
- Country: Peru
- Language: Spanish

Allpakallpa is a 1975 Peruvian drama film directed by Bernardo Arias. It was entered into the 9th Moscow International Film Festival where it won a Silver Prize.

== Cast ==
- Zully Azurin as Valicha
- Tulio Loza as Nemesio (as Tulio Loza Bonifaz)
- Jorge Pool Cano as Teacher
- Cuchita Salazar as Doralina
- Hudson Valdiva as Landowner
