= Kafr kasem =

1975 film

- Directed by: Borhane Alaouié
- Starring: Abdallah Abbassi
- Cinematography: Michel Houssiau
- Release date: July 1975
- Running time: 120 minutes
- Country: Syria
- Language: Arabic

Kafr kasem is a 1975 Syrian drama film directed by Borhane Alaouié. It was entered into the 9th Moscow International Film Festival where it won a Diploma. The subject of the film is the Kafr Qasim massacre that occurred in Israel in 1956.

== Cast ==
- Abdallah Abbassi
- Ahmad Ayub
- Salim Sabri
- Shafiq Manfaluti
- Charlotte Rushdi
- Zaina Hanna
- Intissar Shammar
