= Stanislav Strnad =

Czech film director

- Born: 17 December 1930; Prague, Czechoslovakia
- Died: 5 April 2012 (aged 81); Prague, Czech Republic
- Occupations: Film director, screenwriter
- Years active: 1960–1986

Stanislav Strnad (17 December 1930 – 5 April 2012) was a Czech film director and screenwriter. He directed 12 films between 1960 and 1986. His 1975 film My Brother Has a Cute Brother was entered into the 9th Moscow International Film Festival where it won a Silver Prize. His 1977 film Do Be Quick was entered into the 10th Moscow International Film Festival.

== Selected filmography ==
- My Brother Has a Cute Brother (1975)
- Do Be Quick (1977)
