= De Held =

2016 film

- Film poster
- Directed by: Menno Meyjes
- Written by: Jessica Durlacher; Menno Meyjes
- Starring: Fedja van Huêt
- Distributed by: Dutch FilmWorks
- Release date: 29 September 2016
- Country: Netherlands
- Language: Dutch
- Box office: $58,726

De Held is a 2016 Dutch crime film directed by Menno Meyjes. It was based on the novel of the same name by Jessica Durlacher. It was listed as one of eleven films that could be selected as the Dutch submission for the Best Foreign Language Film at the 89th Academy Awards, but it was not nominated. De Held turned out to be the last movie with actress Kitty Courbois.

== Cast ==
- Fedja van Huêt as Jacob
- Daan Schuurmans as Anton
- Monic Hendrickx as Sara
- Kitty Courbois as Iezebel
- Susan Visser as Judith
