= Wik Jongsma =

Dutch actor (1943–2008)

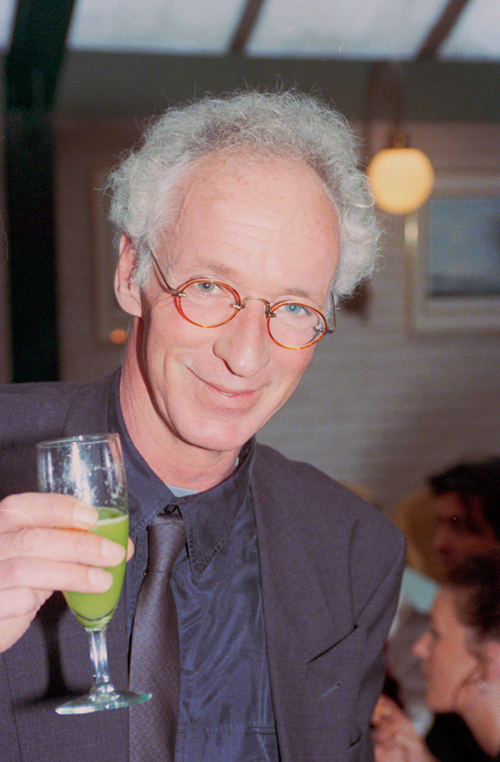
- Wik Jonsgma in 1994
- Born: 4 April 1943; Amsterdam, Netherlands
- Died: 7 November 2008 (aged 65); The Hague, Netherlands
- Occupation: Actor
- Years active: 1972–2005

Wik Jongsma (4 April 1943 – 7 November 2008) was a Dutch film and television actor.

== Early life ==
He was born in Amsterdam, Netherlands.

== Career ==
Jongsma appeared in various television productions between 1976 and 2005, including appearing as Govert Harmsen in 82 episodes (1991–2005) of the soap-opera television series Goede tijden, slechte tijden (in English language — Good Times, Bad Times).

He also appeared in two films.

=== Filmography ===
Year	Film	Role	Genre
1983	An Bloem	Herman	drama
1972	The Little Ark	Second Man	adventure; family

== Death ==
Jongsma died in The Hague, Netherlands, age 65, after a long battle with prostate cancer.
