= 9th Moscow International Film Festival =

Film festival

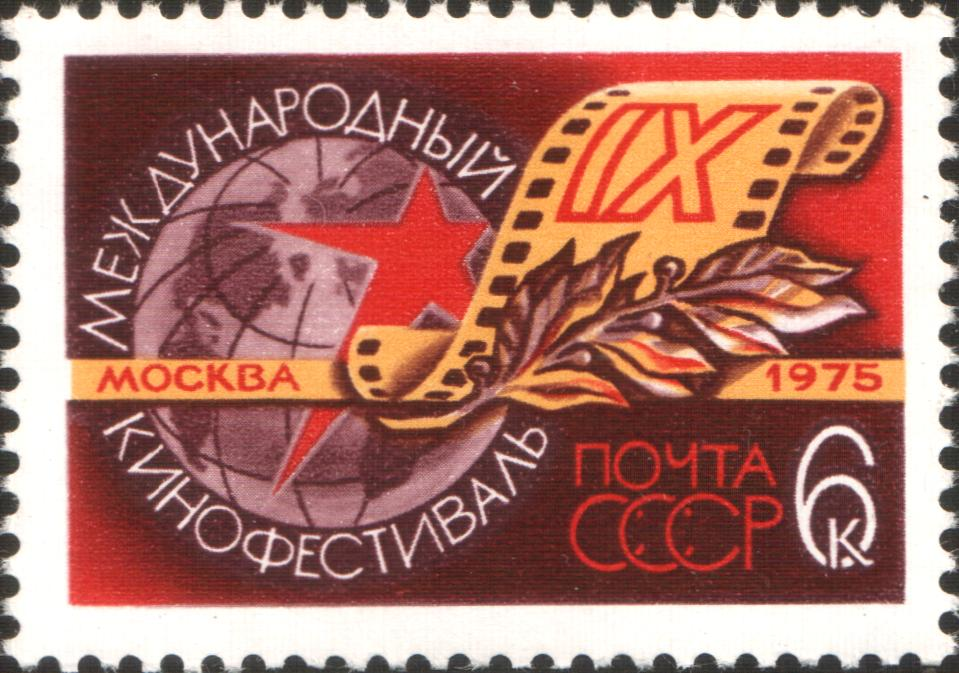
- A 1975 postage stamp themed after the festival.
- Location: Moscow, Soviet Union
- Founded: 1959
- Awards: Grand Prix
- Festival date: 10–23 July 1975
- Website: http://www.moscowfilmfestival.ru

The 9th Moscow International Film Festival was held from 10 to 23 July 1975. The Golden Prizes were awarded to the Polish film The Promised Land directed by Andrzej Wajda, the Soviet-Japanese film Dersu Uzala directed by Akira Kurosawa and the Italian film We All Loved Each Other So Much directed by Ettore Scola.

== Jury ==
- Stanislav Rostotsky (USSR - President of the Jury)
- Sergio Amidei (Italy)
- Hortensia Bussi (Chile)
- Antonín Brousil (Czechoslovakia)
- Ravjagiin Dorjpalam (Mongolia)
- Jerzy Kawalerowicz (Poland)
- Ramu Kariat (India)
- Nevena Kokanova (Bulgaria)
- Komaki Kurihara (Japan)
- Ababakar Samb (Senegal)
- Jean-Daniel Simon (France)
- Iosif Kheifits (USSR)
- Sofiko Chiaureli (USSR)
- Monsef Charfeddin (Tunisia)
- Bert Schneider (USA)

== Films in competition ==
The following films were selected for the main competition:

English title	Original title	Director(s)	Production country
The Actor and the Savages	Actorul şi sălbaticii	Manole Marcus	Romania
The White Wall	Den vita väggen	Stig Björkman	Sweden
Great Expectations	Great Expectations	Joseph Hardy	Great Britain
Souvenir of Gibraltar	Souvenir of Gibraltar	Henri Xhonneux	Belgium, France
The Year of the Solar Eclipse	Nar hirtsen jil	Dshamjangijn Buntar	Mongolia
Girl from Hanoi	Em bé Hà Nội	Hải Ninh	North Vietnam
Dersu Uzala	Dersu Uzala	Akira Kurosawa	Soviet Union, Japan
Home for Christmas	Jouluksi kotiin	Jaakko Pakkasvirta	Finland
The House in the South	La casa del Sur	Sergio Olhovich	Mexico
The Other Francisco	El otro Francisco	Sergio Giral	Cuba
The Promised Land	Ziemia obiecana	Andrzej Wajda	Poland
How to Be an Adult	Eya Dan Loku Lamayek	Dharmasena Pathiraja	Sri Lanka
Kafr kasem	Kafr kasem	Borhane Alaouié	Syria
The Red Apple	Krasnoe yabloko	Tolomush Okeyev	Soviet Union
Castle of Sand	Suna no utsuwa	Yoshitarō Nomura	Japan
A Peasant on a Bicycle	Selyaninat s koleloto	Lyudmil Kirkov	Bulgaria
My Little Loves	Mes petites amoureuses	Jean Eustache	France
Between Day and Night	Zwischen Nacht und Tag	Horst E. Brandt	East Germany
We All Loved Each Other So Much	C'eravamo tanto amati	Ettore Scola	Italy
Nazareno Cruz and the Wolf	Nazareno Cruz y el lobo	Leonardo Favio	Argentina
The Legacy	L'héritage	Mohamed Bouamari	Algeria
141 Minutes from the Unfinished Sentence	141 perc a befejezetlen mondatból	Zoltán Fábri	Hungary
La guerre du pétrole n'aura pas lieu	La guerre du pétrole n'aura pas lieu	Souheil Ben-Barka	Morocco
The Condemned	Totstellen	Axel Corti	Austria, West Germany
Only the Wind Knows the Answer	Die Antwort kennt nur der Wind	Alfred Vohrer	West Germany, France
The Last Fleksnes	Den siste Fleksnes	Bo Hermansson	Norway
Thai Tigers Roar	Payak rai thaiteep	Sakka Charuchinda	Thailand
The Regent's Wife	La Regenta	Gonzalo Suárez	Spain
Red Sien	Rooie Sien	Frans Weisz	Netherlands
Allpakallpa	Allpakallpa	Bernardo Arias	Peru
La quema de Judas	La quema de Judas	Román Chalbaud	Venezuela
Sons of Quiet	أبناء الصمت Sons of Quiet	Minir Radi	Egypt
My Brother Has a Cute Brother	Můj brácha má prima bráchu	Stanislav Strnad	Czechoslovakia
The Republic of Užice	Uzicka Republika	Žika Mitrović	Yugoslavia
Xala	Xala	Ousmane Sembène	Senegal
Chorus	Chorus	Mrinal Sen	India

== Awards ==
- Golden Prize:
  - The Promised Land by Andrzej Wajda
  - Dersu Uzala by Akira Kurosawa
  - We All Loved Each Other So Much by Ettore Scola
- Silver Prizes:
  - Chorus by Mrinal Sen
  - My Brother Has a Cute Brother by Stanislav Strnad
  - Allpakallpa by Bernardo Arias
- Special Prizes:
  - Director: Zoltán Fábri for 141 Minutes from the Unfinished Sentence
  - The Year of the Solar Eclipse by Dshamjangijn Buntar
- Prizes:
  - Best Actor Miguel Benavides for The Other Francisco
  - Best Actor Georgi Georgiev-Getz for A Peasant on a Bicycle
  - Best Actress Harriet Andersson for The White Wall
  - Best Actress Fatima Bouamari for The Legacy
- Diploma:
  - Kafr kasem by Borhane Alaouié
  - The Republic of Užice by Žika Mitrović
  - Girl from Hanoi by Hai Ninh
  - Castle of Sand by Yoshitarō Nomura
  - The Other Francisco by Sergio Giral
  - Actress: Malini Fonseka for How to Be an Adult
- Prix FIPRESCI: Dersu Uzala by Akira Kurosawa
