= Red Sien =

1975 film

Rooie Sien
- Directed by: Frans Weisz
- Produced by: Rob du Mée
- Music by: Ruud Bos
- Distributed by: Actueel film
- Release date: 27 March 1975
- Running time: 108 minutes
- Country: Netherlands
- Language: Dutch

Red Sien (Dutch: Rooie Sien) is a 1975 Dutch drama film directed by Frans Weisz, produced by Rob du Mée. The story is based on the play with the same name, created by Marius Spree at the start of the 20th century. Beppie Nooij jr. played the role of Rooie Sien ("Red Sien") almost 1500 times on the stage. In the film Willeke Alberti plays the role of the young Sien, while Nooij moved on the role of Sien's mother. The film was entered into the 9th Moscow International Film Festival.

== Plot ==
Rooie Sien starts in 1912, when Rooie Sien is murdered by her husband Ko Breman, because she doesn't want to follow him to Rotterdam. Sien works as a prostitute in Amsterdam, where she works in café De Kikker, with a pimp called Mooie Frans. Sien sings, entertains customers, and in some cases follows them to bed. Her daughter, Sientje, is raised in Rotterdam by her grandparents, the father and mother of Ko.

1923. Sientje is almost an adult and has an adventurous temperament. The son of her neighbour, Gerrit van Buren, has a crush on Sientje, but she craves more excitement. She meets the artist Jan Meiren and is fascinated by his art and smooth manners, and decided to have him teach her to sing and dance, and to perform together. She ends up in the etablissement of Belze Marie where she quickly becomes a celebrated star. Jan en Sien keep performing in Belze's café, but their relation doesn't improve, especially when Sientje gets pregnant. Sientje's father, Ko, visits them in the café, who sees a lot of similarities between Sientje and her mother; he predicts she will end up in the gutter, but Sientje doesn't listen.

1932. Belze Marie and her husband have a smooth-running cabaret in Den Haag, and Jan Sien follow them there. But there relation is struggling. Jan is showing an interest in the blond dancer Angelique, and when these two start a relation, Sientje flees from the café. At New Year's Eve 1933 Sientje and Jan break up for good. Sientje's father shows up, and she follows him back to Rotterdam to take care of her grandparents.

== Cast ==
- Beppie Nooij jr - Sien Breman
- Willeke Alberti - Sien junior
- Myra Ward - Oma Breman
- Wim van den Brink - Opa Breman
- Cor van Rijn - Mooie Frans
- Wim Kouwenhoven - Keesbaas, client of Sien sr.
- Kees Brusse - Ko Breman, Sien's father
- Sacco van der Made - Van Buren
