= An Bloem =

1983 film

- Directed by: Peter Oosthoek
- Written by: Ton Vorstenbosch (play)
- Release date: 1983
- Running time: 83 minutes
- Country: Netherlands
- Language: Dutch

An Bloem is a 1983 Dutch film directed by Peter Oosthoek. It was his first feature-length film.

== Plot ==
An Bloem is married to Frans, who runs a tobacco shop. When her father is on his deathbed, An is by his side, and compares her own life to her father's, coming to the conclusion that neither of them has fared well in life. Back at home, she rebels against her lifeless existence and gets into an argument with Frans. At first, Frans thinks his wife is just grieving her father's death, but when she goes to see a lawyer, the reality sinks in: An wants a Festival. She leaves the house and moves into a room of her own. Not long after, she gets a job at a nursing home and is able to support herself.

Frans rallies the family, but the couple's two daughters who live away from home, Lucia and Loedie, are not impressed by An's departure. When An goes out and attends a “lonely hearts ball", she is nearly robbed of her handbag. She is rescued by Dik, a wealthy middle-aged businessman. An and Dik start a relationship, but it ends quickly when An introduces her new boyfriend to Loedie, who charms Dik and promptly becomes pregnant. After Dik and Loedie's wedding, An takes care of the household in Dik's expensive villa. But Loedie demands that her mother leave, and An returns to Frans. Everything seems to be returning to normal until, at a party in her home, An suddenly gets up and runs outside. She crosses the street and is hit by a car. When the family gathers at the hospital, they learn that An has died.

== Cast ==
- Kitty Courbois as An Bloem
- Renée Soutendijk as Loedie
- Rijk de Gooyer as Dik
- Marina de Graaf as Lucia
- Ben Hulsman as Frans
- Lettie Oosthoek as Rietje
- Wik Jongsma as Herman
- Jules Hamel as Cees
- Hetty Verhoogt as Wil
- Truce Speyk as Oma
- Jaap Hoogstra as Opa
