= How to Be an Adult =

1975 film

Eya Dan Loku Lamayek එයා දැන් ලොකු ළමයෙක්
- Directed by: Dharmasena Pathiraja
- Written by: Dharmasena Pathiraja
- Starring: Malini Fonseka; Vijaya Kumaratunga; Shanthi Lekha; Wimal Kumara de Costa
- Cinematography: K. D. Dayananda
- Edited by: Sextus Aponso
- Music by: Sarath Dassanayake
- Release date: 27 May 1975
- Country: Sri Lanka
- Language: Sinhala

Eya Dan Loku Lamayek (How to Be an Adult) (Sinhala: එයා දැන් ලොකු ළමයෙක්) is a 1975 Sri Lankan drama film written and directed by Dharmasena Pathiraja. It was entered into the 9th Moscow International Film Festival.

== Cast ==
- Malini Fonseka as Katuwalagedera 'Susila' Susilawathie 'Susee'
- Vijaya Kumaratunga as Ratnayake Arachilage Ratnayake 'Ralahamy'
- Shanthi Lekha as Susila's Amma
- Wimal Kumara de Costa as Siripala
- Nishanka Diddeniya as Podi 'Malli'
- Ananda Fonseka as Loku 'Malli'
- Hilda Agnes as Lizzy 'Nona'
- Sriyani Perera as Manel
- Piyasena Ahangama as English Mahathaya
- Daya Thennakoon as Lustful temple worker
- Vincent Vaas as Vigilante leader
- Eddie Jayamanne as Mama
- Cyril Wickramage as Fighting card dealer
- Somasiri Dehipitiya as Bootlegger
- Gamini Ganegoda as School trip teacher
- Piyasili Dias as Susee's aunt
- U. Ariyawimal as Second Ralahamy
- Miyuri Samarasinghe as School trip teacher
- Agnes Sirisena as Susee's Relative
