= Judith Herzberg =

Dutch poet and writer (born 1934)

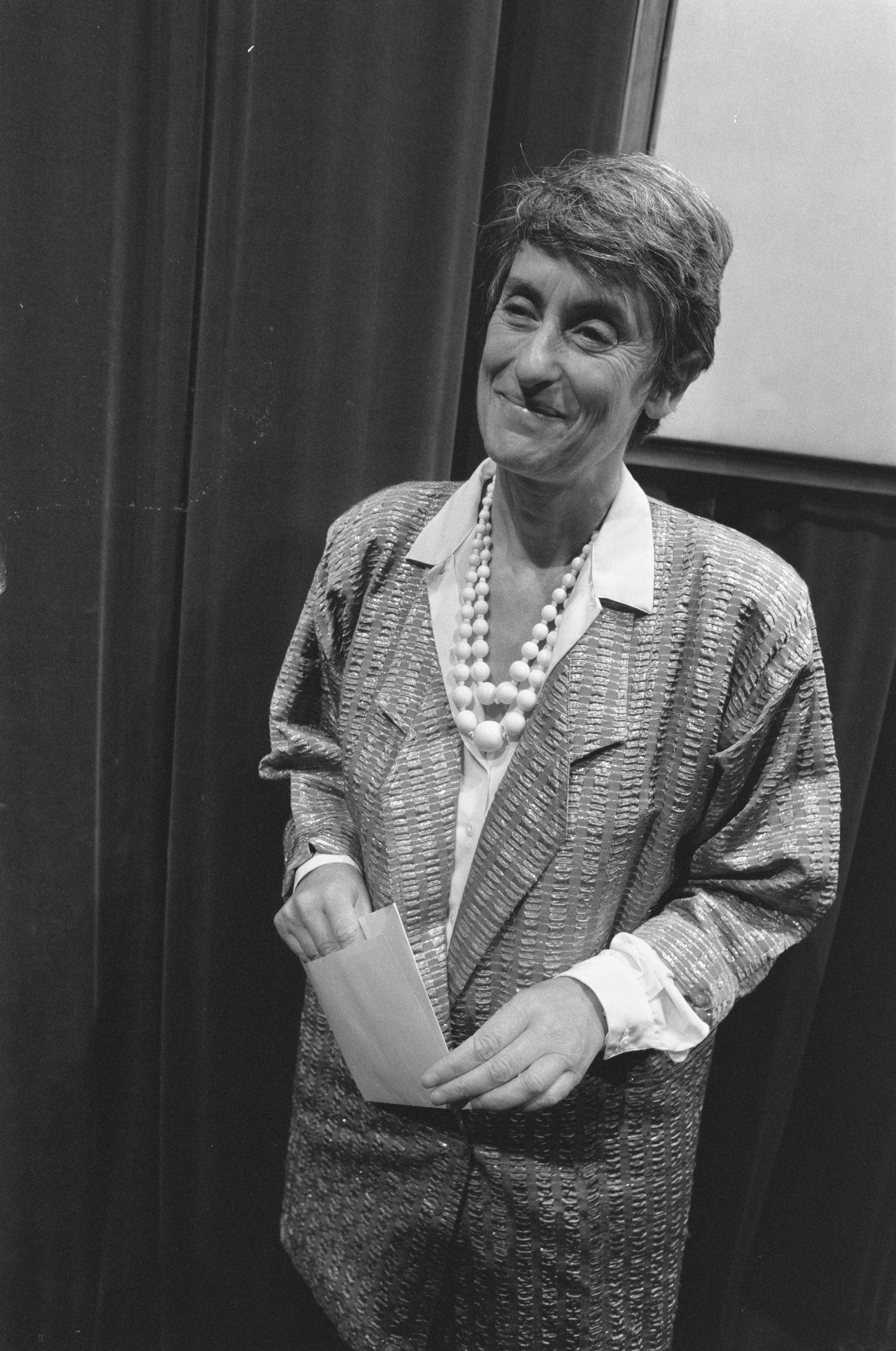
- Judith Herzberg (1988)
- Born: Judith Frieda Lina Herzberg; November 4, 1934 (age 91); Amsterdam, Netherlands
- Occupations: Poet, playwright, screenwriter

Judith Frieda Lina Herzberg (born November 4, 1934) is a Dutch poet and writer.

== Life and work ==
Judith Herzberg is the daughter of lawyer and writer Abel Herzberg. During World War II Herzberg went into hiding on various locations. Since 1983 Herzberg lives alternately in the Netherlands and Israel. She mainly writes poems and plays, and also works on films. Herzberg debuted in 1961 as a poet in the weekly Vrij Nederland. Two years later, she published her first poetry collection, Zeepost. She also wrote the plays Leedvermaak, Charlotte and Rijgdraad, which were made into films by Frans Weisz. Charlotte is about the painter Charlotte Salomon who was murdered in Auschwitz. In 1997 Herzberg received the P. C. Hooft Award for her entire oeuvre. In 2018, she was awarded the Prijs Der Nederlandse Letteren.

== Awards ==
- 1980 Bavarian Film Awards, Best Screenplay
- 1981 Jan Campert Prize for Botshol
- 1988 Charlotte Köhler-prijs voor Literatuur for Leedvermaak
- 1988 Cestoda-prijs
- 1989 Nederlands-Vlaamse Toneelschrijfprijs for Kras
- 1994 Constantijn Huygens Prize
- 1997 P. C. Hooft Award
- 2018 Prijs der Nederlandse Letteren
- 2022 Horst Bienek Prize for Poetry

== Works ==
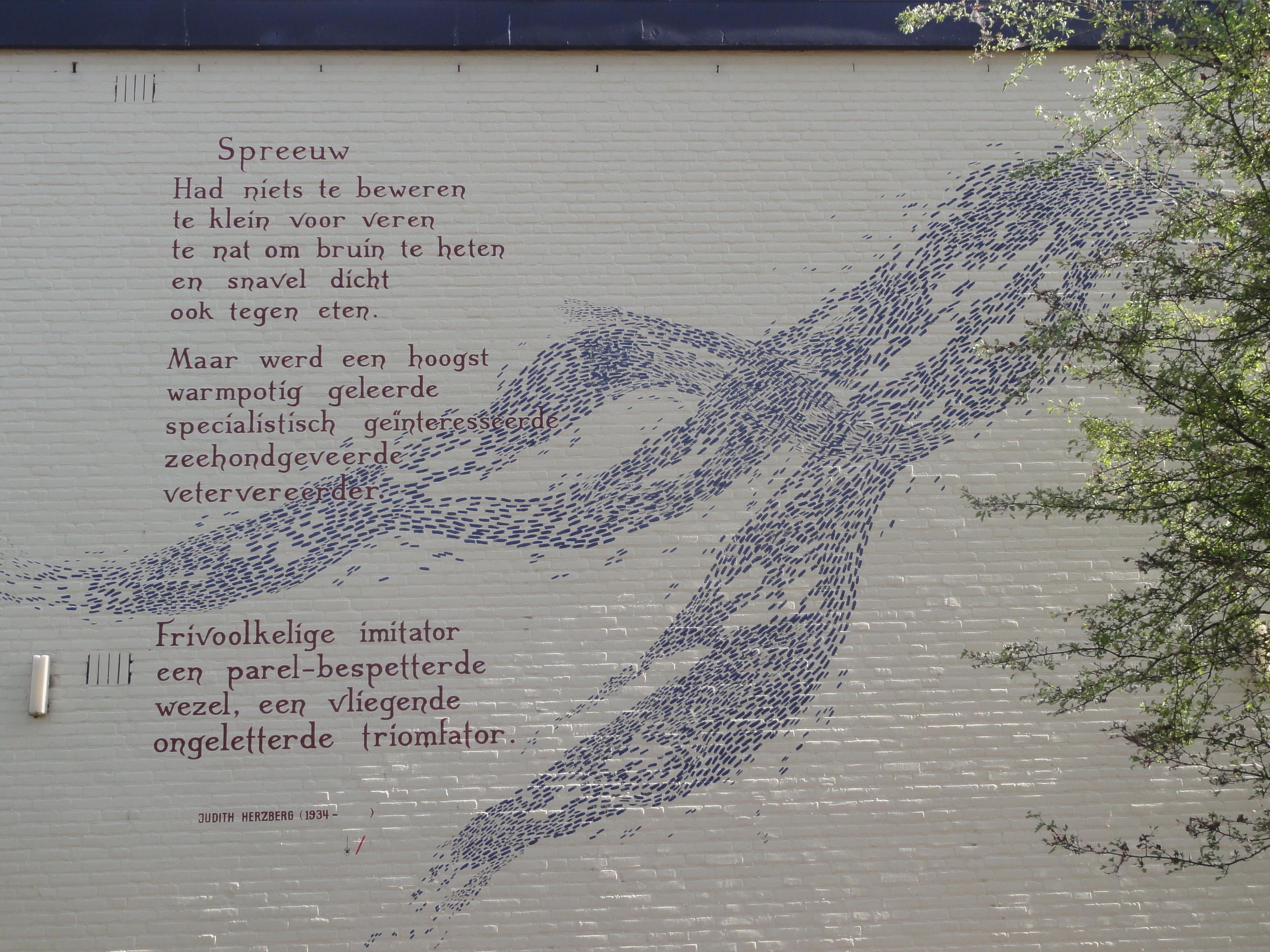
Wall poem in Leiden

- 1963 – Zeepost (poetry)
- 1968 – Beemdgras (poetry)
- 1970 – Vliegen (poetry)
- 1971 – Strijklicht (poetry)
- 1971 – 27 liefdesliedjes (poetry)
- 1974 – Dat het 's ochtends ochtend wordt. De deur stond open. Twee dramastukken (drama)
- 1977 – Het maken van gedichten en het praten daarover (essay)
- 1980 – Botshol (poetry)
- 1981 – Charlotte. diary bij een film (diary)
- 1982 – Leedvermaak (drama)
- 1983 – De val van Icarus (poetry) Deels eerder verschenen in Botshol
- 1984 – Dagrest (poetry)
- 1984 – Twintig gedichten (poetry)
- 1985 – En/of (drama)
- 1986 – Merg (drama)
- 1986 – De kleine zeemeermin (drama)
- 1987 – Zoals (poetry)
- 1988 – Tussen Amsterdam en Tel Aviv (articles and letters)
- 1988 – De Caracal. Een monoloog (drama)
- 1989 – Kras (drama)
- 1991 – Een goed hoofd (drama)
- 1991 – Teksten voor drama en film. 1972–1988
- 1992 – Zoals (poetry) Bevat onder meer de 12 gedichten uit Zoals uit 1987
- 1994 – Doen en laten. Een keuze uit de gedichten (poetry)
- 1995 – Rijgdraad (drama)
- 1996 – Brief aan wie niet hier is. Tussen Jeruzalem en Amsterdam (reisverslag)
- 1996 – Wat zij wilde schilderen (poetry)
- 1997 – De Nietsfabriek (drama)
- 1998 – Een golem (play)
- 1998 – Landschap (poems)
- 1999 – Bijvangst (poems)
- 2000 – Lieve Arthur (drama)
- 2004 – Soms vaak (poetry)
- 2004 – Thuisreis (drama)
- 2024 – Kneedwezens (poetry)
