= Beyroutou el lika =

1981 film

- Directed by: Borhane Alaouié
- Written by: Ahmed Beydoun
- Produced by: Hassen Daldoul
- Starring: Haithem el Amine
- Cinematography: Alexis Grivas
- Edited by: Eliane Du Bois
- Release date: 1981
- Running time: 125 minutes
- Country: Lebanon
- Language: Arabic

Beyroutou el lika (Beirut the Encounter) is a 1981 Lebanese drama film directed by Borhane Alaouié. It competed in competition at the 32nd Berlin International Film Festival and the 38th Venice International Film Festival.

== Cast ==
- Haithem el Amine - Haydar
- Nadine Acoury - Zeina
- Najoua Haydar - Zamzam
- Houcem Sabbah - Mustafa
- Renée Dick - Zeina's Mother
- Raafet Haydar - Zeina's brother
