= Salah Tizani =

Lebanese actor and comedian

- Born: Salah Tizani (Arabic: صلاح تيزاني); 1927 (age 98–99); Tripoli, Lebanon
- Occupations: Actor, comedian
- Years active: 1955–2014

Salah Tizani (in Arabic صلاح تيزاني), full name Salaheddine Mohammad Ameen al Tizani (born 1927 in Tripoli, Lebanon) is a well-known Lebanese actor and comedian. He is best known for his character Abou Salim (in Arabic أبو سليم), the title character of a few long-running Lebanese comedy television series, where he portrayed the character of a funny, simple and conciliatory man trying to solve the rifts between the various characters in the series. The series were credited to "Abou Salim and his Troupe" (أبو سليم وفرقته) and included other memorable characters such as "Fehmen," played by Mahmoud Mabsout, "Asaad," played by Abdallah Homsi, "Shukri Shukrallah," played by Salah Sobh, and "Zaghloul," played by Fouad Hassan, all of whom were actors from the northern Lebanese city of Tripoli.

== Life and career ==
Tizani started his acting career on Tripoli stages, until he was signed with Tele Liban's Channel 7 to produce and present the series Abou Salim (in Arabic أبو سليم) or Abou Salim al Tabl (in Arabic أبو سليم الطبل) as a main rival to another very popular series called Abou Melhem (in Arabic أبو ملحم) (starring Adib Haddad and his wife Salwa Haddad), which aired on Tele Liban's channel 5.

After a very long run, the series Abou Salim was stopped in 1975 with the eruption of the Lebanese Civil War. New series with the same title character were launched in the 1990s on Lebanese television stations. And in 2000, Dubai TV also produced a series of episodes with the same characters entitled Abou Salim 2000.

Besides Abou Salim, Salah Tizani appeared in a number of other comedic programmes. He also appeared in stage acts by the Rahbani Brothers with the Lebanese diva Fairuz. On the wide screen, he appeared in the long features Safarbarlek and Abou Salim in Africa. He also recorded a number of comedic songs which were released on vinyl.

== Filmography ==
=== Television series ===
- Abou Salim (أبو سليم)
- Sayyarat al Jam'iyya (سيارة الجمعية)
- Koul Yawm hikaya (كل يوم حكاية)
- Al Abwab as Sab'aa (الأبواب السبعة)
- Al milyoner al muzayyaf (المليونير المزيف)
- Foundouq al saada (فندق السعادة)
- Abou Salim 2000 (أبو سليم 2000)
- Abou Wisam (أبو وسام)

=== Theatre ===
- Al Mousafer (المسافر)
- Naeem wa faheem (نعيم وفهيم)
- Safarbarlek (سفربرلك)
- Bint el hareth (بنت الحارس)
- Kher el deen (خيرالدين)

=== Films ===
- 1962: Abou Salim fil Madeena
- 1963: Abou Salim rasoul el gharam
- 1965: Abou Salim fi Afriqya (أبو سليم في أفريقيا)
- 1966: Safarbarlek in role of Fares (سفربرلك)
- 1967: Bint el hareth (بنت الحارس)
