= Sri Lanka Media Training Institute =

- Established: 1984
- Affiliations: Ministry of Parliamentary Reform and Mass Media
- Chairman: Dharmasena Pathiraja
- Location: Colombo, Sri Lanka
- Website: http://www.slmti.lk

The Sri Lanka Media Training Institute (SLMTI) is an autonomous establishment under the Ministry of Mass Media and Information. It was founded in 1984; as the Sri Lankan Television Training Institute to train professionals in the field of television. The institute was run in collaboration with Friedrich Ebert Stiftung (FES) of Bonn, Federal Republic of Germany, Sri Lanka Rupavahini Corporation (SLRC), and Sri Lanka Foundation Institute (SLFI). At present as the SLMTI the institute has widened its mandate to offers certificates, Diplomas and higher Diplomas in all disciplines related to Mass Media. The Chairman of SLMTI is Dr. Dharmasena Pathiraja who is a Sri Lankan film director, screenwriter and an academic.

== Courses offered by SLMTI ==
Certificate courses:

- Certificate in Camera And Lighting Techniques
- Certificate in Non-Linear Video Editing
- Certificate Course in TV Program Production
- Certificate in Web Designing & Development
- TV Presentation & News Reading
- Certificate in Radio Announcing And Production
- Certificate in 3d Animation
- Digital Non-Linear Video Editing (Final Cut Pro)

Diploma courses:

- Advanced Diploma in Digital Postproduction Technology
- Diploma in Journalism
- Diploma in Film Directing Technology and Aesthetic
- Diploma in Digital Cinematography
- Diploma in English for Media

== Facilities ==
RECORDING STUDIO : Studio Area 150 sq. meter

SLMTI has a recording studio. This studio fulfills the internal training requirements as well as the recording needs of external bodies.
