= Do Be Quick =

1977 film

- Directed by: Stanislav Strnad
- Written by: Arno Kraus
- Starring: Zdenek Hradilák
- Cinematography: Jan Novák
- Release date: April 1977
- Running time: 77 minutes
- Country: Czechoslovakia
- Language: Czech

Do Be Quick (Czech: Běž, ať ti neuteče) is a 1977 Czech drama film directed by Stanislav Strnad. It was entered into the 10th Moscow International Film Festival.

== Cast ==
- Zdenek Hradilák as Frantisek Kabát
- Marie Drahokoupilová as Tereza Kabátová
- Ivan Lutansky as Ivan Kabát
- Martin Růžek as Emil Martinec
- Karolina Slunécková as Eva Martincová
- Radoslav Brzobohatý as Jirí Voník
- Milena Dvorská
- Adolf Filip as nadporucík VB
- Grazyna Sahatqiu as Alena Martincová
- Jana Gýrová as Ruzena Voníková
- Miloš Willig as Václav Houdek
