= The Betrayed (1992 film) =

1992 film

Op afbetaling
- Directed by: Frans Weisz
- Written by: Jan Blokker
- Based on: Op afbetaling 1952 novel by Simon Vestdijk
- Produced by: René Seegers
- Starring: Gijs Scholten van Aschat, Renée Soutendijk, Coen Flink
- Cinematography: Goert Giltay
- Edited by: Ton Ruys
- Music by: Theo Nijland
- Release date: May 10, 1992
- Running time: 120 minutes
- Country: Netherlands
- Language: Dutch

The Betrayed (Dutch: Op Afbetaling) is a 1992 Dutch drama film made for television directed by Frans Weisz. It was entered into the 43rd Berlin International Film Festival.

== Cast ==
- Gijs Scholten van Aschat as Henk Grond
- Renée Soutendijk as Olga Grond
- Coen Flink as Grewestein
- Annet Malherbe as Mien
- Willem Nijholt as Krynie Woudema
- Adriaan Adriaanse as Florist
- Belou Den Tex as Fried Folters
- Frans de Wit as Gorilla
- Marieke Heebink as Alie
- Damien Hope as Charly
- Ferry Kaljee as Knockouter
- Mark Rietman as Surgeon
- Gerardjan Rijnders as Psychiatrist
- Johan Simons as Detective 1
- Wouter Steenbergen as Sjel van Relte
- Evert van der Meulen as Detective 2
- Marisa Van Eyle as Emmy
- Jack Wouterse as Pees
