= Life Is Wonderful =

2018 film

- Film poster
- Directed by: Frans Weisz
- Written by: Theo Nijland
- Produced by: Matthijs van Heijningen
- Starring: Tine Joustra
- Release date: 25 January 2018
- Running time: 94 minutes
- Country: Netherlands
- Language: Dutch

Life Is Wonderful (Dutch: Het leven is vurrukkulluk) is a 2018 Dutch romantic comedy film directed by Frans Weisz. It was based on the book of the same name by Remco Campert, written in 1961. In July 2018, it was one of nine films shortlisted to be the Dutch entry for the Best Foreign Language Film at the 91st Academy Awards, but it was not selected.

== Cast ==
- Tine Joustra as Mother Mees
- Willeke van Ammelrooy as Rosa Overbeek
- Anniek Pheifer as Etta
- Romy Lauwers as Panda
