= A Gangstergirl =

1966 film

- Film poster
- Directed by: Frans Weisz
- Written by: Jan Blokker; Remco Campert; Frans Weisz
- Produced by: Jan Vrijman
- Starring: Paolo Graziosi
- Cinematography: Gérard Vandenberg
- Edited by: Astrid Weyman
- Release date: 13 October 1966
- Running time: 90 minutes
- Country: Netherlands
- Language: Dutch

A Gangstergirl (Dutch: Het Gangstermeisje) is a 1966 Dutch drama film directed by Frans Weisz. It was entered into the 17th Berlin International Film Festival.

== Plot ==
A popular young writer cannot decide which direction his life should go in. Should he stay at home with his wife and his typewriter? Travel to a movie-centric Italian town? He stays at the house of two gay friends while trying to figure this out.

== Cast ==
- Paolo Graziosi - Wessel Franken
- Kitty Courbois
- Astrid Weyman - (as Asta Weyne)
- Gian Maria Volonté
- Walter Kous
- Joop van Hulzen - (as Joop van Hulsen)
- Dub Dubois
- Maurice Vrijdag
- Peter Schat
- Hans van den Bergh
- Lina Conti
- Nol Gregoor
- Henriette Klautz
- Peter Lohr
- Ilse Monsanto
