= Vlees =

- Directed by: Victor Nieuwenhuijs; Maartje Seyferth
- Written by: Maartje Seyferth
- Cinematography: Victor Nieuwenhuijs
- Edited by: Vima Kara; Tarek
- Production companies: De Productie; Moskito Film
- Release date: 2010
- Running time: 85 minutes
- Country: Netherlands
- Language: Dutch

Vlees (Meat) is a 2010 Dutch erotic drama-thriller film directed by Victor Nieuwenhuijs and Maartje Seyferth. It follows a young blonde woman working at a butcher shop and her relationships with a butcher who sexually harasses her (which she enjoys) and her boyfriend who is involved with a murder. Vlees premiered at the 2010 International Film Festival Rotterdam.
