= Borhane Alaouié =

Lebanese film director (1941–2021)

- Born: 1 April 1941; Arnoun, Greater Lebanon, Mandate for Syria and the Lebanon, France
- Died: 9 September 2021 (aged 80)
- Occupation: Film director
- Years active: 1971–2021

Borhane Alaouié (1 April 1941 – 9 September 2021) was a Lebanese film director. He directed ten films since 1975. His debut film Kafr kasem was entered into the 9th Moscow International Film Festival where it won a Diploma. His 1981 film Beyroutou el lika was entered into the 32nd Berlin International Film Festival.

== Filmography ==
- Kafr kasem (1975)
- Il ne suffit pas que dieu soit avec les pauvres (1978)
- Beyroutou el lika (1981)
- A Letter from a Time of War (1985)
- Lettre d'un temps d'exil (1990)
- Assouan, le haut barrage (1992)
- The Gulf War... What Next? (1993)
- A toi où que tu sois (1999)
- Khalass (2007)
- Mazen wal namla (2008)
