= Karhan =

Karhan (feminine: Karhanová) is a Slovak surname. Notable people with the surname include:

- Miroslav Karhan (born 1976), Slovak footballer
- Patrick Karhan (born 2003), Slovak footballer

== See also ==
- Karhan, Uttar Pradesh, a village in India
