= Khalass =

Khalass - خلص
- Directed by: Borhane Alaouié
- Written by: Borhane Alaouié
- Produced by: Sabine Sidawi
- Starring: Fady Abi Khalil; Natasha Achkar; Rifaat Tarabaye
- Cinematography: Remon Fromont
- Release date: 2007
- Running time: 101 minutes
- Country: Lebanon
- Language: Arabic

Khalass (Arabic: خلص, English: Enough) is a 2007 Lebanese film by the Lebanese director Borhane Alaouié.

== Synopsis ==
The film is set in present-day Beirut in the midst of chaotic reconstruction. Ahmed and Robby became friends during the war, sharing similar dreams. Like many others, they fought for that dream, but they came out of the war with a bitter feeling of betrayal and disappointment.

== Cast ==
- Fady Abi Khalil as Ahmed
- Haytham Oueidat as 16-year-old Ahmed
- Raymond Hosni as Robby
- Natasha Achkar as Abir
- Jennifer Tabet as Young Abir
- Refaat Tarabay as Raymond
- Wafaa Trabaye as Robby's mother
- Hamzeh Nasrallah as William Nawi
- Ovidio Al Hout as La Chouette
- Hanane Haj Ali as Oum Wissam
- Adel Haidar as Farid
- Wafa Tarabay as Oum Robby
- Diala Kashmar as Gallery woman
- Mahmoud Mabsout as Bus driver

== Awards ==
- Dubai International Film Festival 2007
  - Best Screenplay
  - Best Editor
