= Leedvermaak =

1989 film

- Theatrical release poster
- Directed by: Frans Weisz
- Written by: Judith Herzberg
- Starring: Catherine ten Bruggencate; Pierre Bokma; Kitty Courbois
- Cinematography: Goert Giltay
- Edited by: Ton Ruys
- Music by: Theo Nijland
- Production company: Riverside Pictures
- Distributed by: Cannon Tuschinski Film Distribution
- Release date: 6 October 1989
- Running time: 92 minutes
- Country: Netherlands
- Language: Dutch

Leedvermaak is a 1989 Dutch drama film directed by Frans Weisz on a Jewish wedding in the Netherlands overshadowed by the trauma of the Holocaust. The film was selected as the Dutch entry for the Best Foreign Language Film at the 62nd Academy Awards, but was not accepted as a nominee.

== Plot ==
Lea, the daughter of a Jewish family who survived Auschwitz, is preparing to marry Nico, a doctor. Her parents Ada and Simon want to hold the wedding ceremony on their estate. Among the invited guests is a woman who cared for their child as a foster child during the Nazi occupation of the Netherlands. Instead of being grateful to this woman, the mother is jealous of her. The wedding party is overshadowed by memories of the Holocaust. In the background of this seemingly cheerful party the personal past of all those involved turns out to play such an important role that nobody is able to celebrate properly.

== Cast ==
- Catherine ten Bruggencate as Lea
- Pierre Bokma as Nico
- Kitty Courbois as Ada, Lea's mother
- Peter Oosthoek as Simon, Lea's father
- Annet Nieuwenhuyzen as Riet
- Rijk de Gooyer as Zwart
- Sigrid Koetse as Duifje

== See also ==
- List of submissions to the 62nd Academy Awards for Best Foreign Language Film
- List of Dutch submissions for the Academy Award for Best Foreign Language Film
