= Dharmasena Pathiraja =

Sri Lankan film director and screenwriter

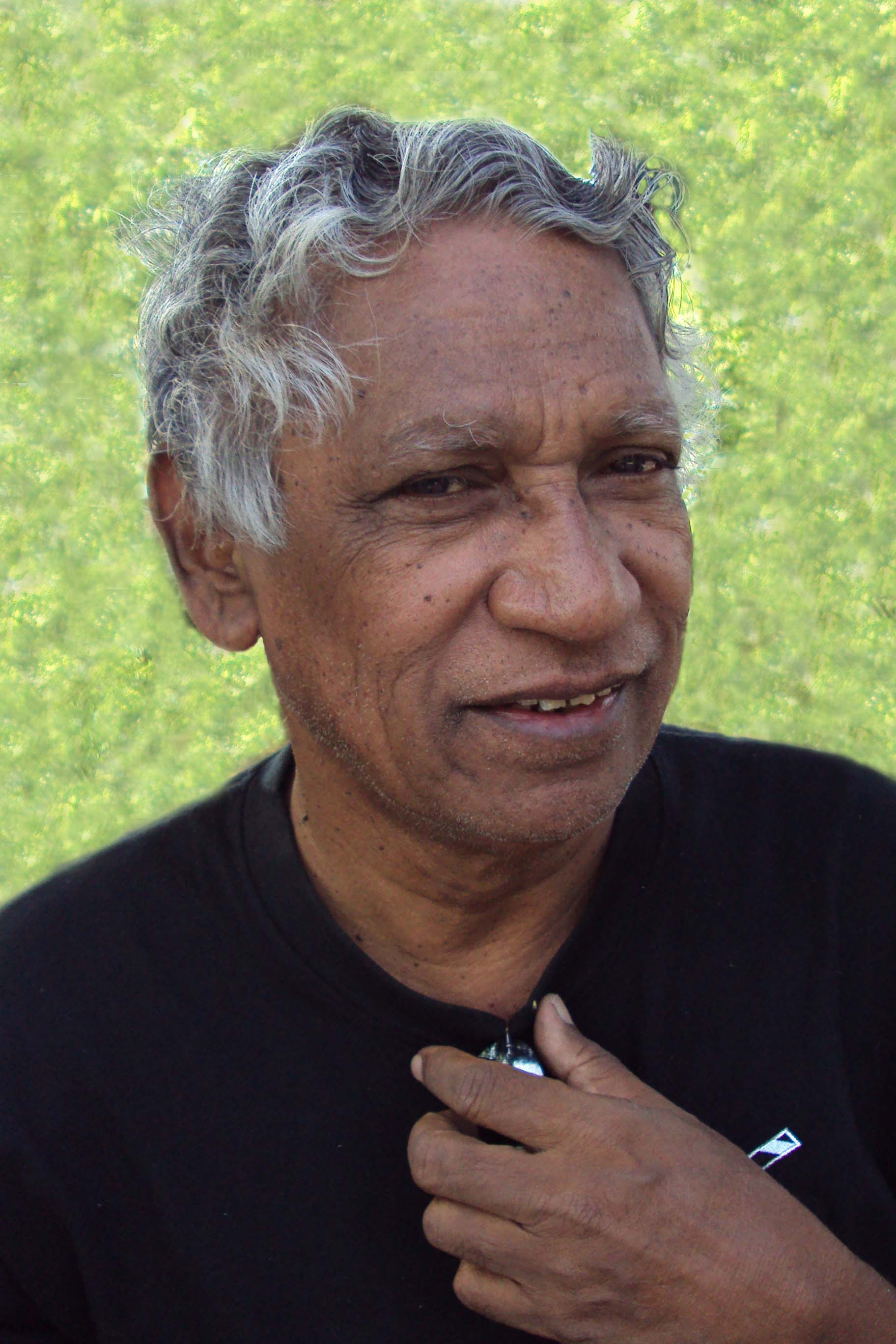
- Born: 28 March 1943; Kandy, Sri Lanka
- Died: 28 January 2018 (aged 74); Lakeside hospital, Kandy, Sri Lanka
- Education: B.A., M.A., PhD
- Alma mater: Dharmaraja College, Kandy, University of Peradeniya, Monash University
- Occupations: University lecturer, Film Maker, screenwriter, Chairman – Sri Lanka Media Training Institute, Head of the Performing Arts Department University of Colombo Sripalee Campus
- Years active: 50 years of experience in film fields
- Spouse: Kusumalatha Malini Pathiraja
- Children: Sumedha Pathiraja, Milinda Pathiraja

Pathiraja Navaratne Wanninayake Mudiyanselage Ranjith Dharmasena (28 March 1943 – 28 January 2018) was a Sri Lankan film director and screenwriter. He has been referred to as a 'rebel with a cause', an ‘enfant terrible of the '70s', and is widely recognized as the pioneer of Sri Lankan cinema’s 'second revolution'. He is also renowned as an academic, playwright and poet.

== Early life ==
Educated at Dharmaraja College, Kandy, Pathiraja graduated from the University of Peradeniya with an honours degree in Sinhala and Western Classical Culture in 1967. Subsequently he began work as a lecturer in Drama and Performance Arts, and later obtained a PhD in Bengali cinema from Monash University. His thesis was The Dialectic of Region and Nation in the Films of Bengali Independents: Ghatak, Ray and Sen (2001). He learned the language of cinema from the film society movement, which was popular in Sri Lanka in the early sixties. He also recognized their sociopolitical limitations in a country which was heading into a period of deep turmoil. He also studied the cinema of radical activists like Jean-Luc Godard, Third Cinema filmmakers like Fernando Solanas and Glauber Rocha, and Asians like Mrinal Sen, Satyajit Ray and Ritwik Ghatak.

== First wave of success (1970–1977) ==
Pathiraja made a short 10-minute film titled Saturo in 1970. His full-length feature film Ahas Gauwa followed four years later. Dealing with the urban lower class, the film was atypical of most commercial films of that period. It was critically well-received, sweeping the FCJAC Awards landing Best Picture, Best Director and Best Actor and winning the Office Catholique Internationale Du Cinema (Sri Lanka) awards for Best Film and Best Director.

1975's Eya Dan Loku Lamayek was Sri Lanka's entry at the 9th Moscow International Film Festival, winning a Special Diploma for Female Performance in 1976 and the Special award from the peace council of the USSR to be screened at the 18th Venice Film Festival in Bergamo, Italy in 1975.

1978's Bambaru Avith is widely considered Pathiraja's masterpiece. That year it represented Sri Lanka at the 10th Moscow International Film Festival and was screened at the Venice and Los Angeles Film Festivals. In Sri Lanka it was awarded Best Director and Best Film honors at the first Presidential Film Awards and the OCIC Awards. In 1997 a special council selected to celebrate 50 years of Sri Lankan Cinema named it the fourth best Sri Lankan film of all-time.

=== Middle period (1977–1981) ===
Later that year, Pathiraja made the Tamil film Ponmani shown at the International Film Festival in India. 1980 saw the filming of Para Dige which was shown some time later at UCLA in the Third World Cinema Program and in France and Melbourne.

1981's Soldadu Unnahe would be Pathiraja's last film for 13 years. It was Sri Lanka's entry to the 8th International Film Festival of India and was awarded Best Film, Best Director and best Script at the third Presidential Film Awards and Best Director and Best Film at the OCIC Awards. OCIC named it the best Sri Lankan film of the 1980 –1990 period in 1990.

== Return to film (1994–2002) ==
1994's Wasuli was a relatively minor film. In 2001 Pathrija returned on a bigger scale with Mathu Yam Dawasa, shown at the Singapore International Film Festival and the 4th Osian's Cinefan Festival of Asian and Arab Cinema, New Delhi.

== Academic career ==
Dharmasena Pathiraja started his academic career at the University of Kelaniya as an assistant lecturer. Later he worked as a lecturer in several Sri Lankan universities, including, University of Jaffna, University of Ruhuna and University of Colombo. He served as the Department Head of Performing Arts of Sripalee Campus University of Colombo for a long time. Dharmasena Pathiraja was also the Chairman of Sri Lanka Media Training Institute.

== Theatergraphy ==
- 1970 Kora saha Andaya (The Lame and the Blind) script. Produced by Dhamma Jagoda.
- 1971 Putu (The Chairs of Eugène Ionesco) Translator and director. It won best translation script in the state drama festival in 1971.

== Filmography ==
Year	Feature Films	Ref.
1974	Ahas Gauwa	
1975	Eya Dan Loku Lamayek	
1978	Ponmani	
1978	Bambaru Avith	
1980	Paradige	
1981	Soldadu Unnehe	
2002	Mathu Yam Dawasa	
2014	Sakkarang	
2014	Swaroopa	

Unscreened Feature

- 1981 Sira Kandavura
- 1983 Shelton Saha Kanthi
- 1994 Whirl Wind (Vasuli) [Colour]

=== Shorts and Documentaries ===
- 2006 In Search of a Road [Colour]
- 1988 Shelter For Million Families – A 15 mts documentary produced to commemorate the International Year of Shelter for the Homeless, Screened at ST. Anne's Theatre, London on the occasion of the ceremonial award presentation for the best housing program of the year won by Sri Lanka. 1988. (35mm Colour)
- 1984 Putting The Last First – A documentary on local level community based projects for NORAD (35 mm Colour)
- 1974 The Coast (Werala) A 30 mts documentary on coast conservation for the Ministry of Fisheries, 1974. ( 35 mm Colour)
- 1972 Anduren Eliyata – From Darkness to Light, A 40 mts documentary on Land Reforms, produced for the Ministry of Agriculture and Land Reforms. 1972 (35mm -Black and White)
- 1969 Enemies (Sathuro) [B&W]

=== Television dramas(series) ===
- 1985 Gangulen Egodata -Crossing the Stream
- 1986 Maaya Mandira – Mansion of Maya. 1986, 27mts.Tele feature For National TV.
- 1988 Ella langa Walawwa – The House By the Waterfall. 1988,14 (27mts) episodes, Tele Drama for the National TV
- 1989 Wanni Hamilage Kathawa – Story of Wannihamy,4 (27mts) episodes, Tele docu drama
- 1989 Sudubandelage Kathawa- Story of Sudu Banda,2 (30mts) episodes Tele docu-drama
- 1989 Pura Sakmana-2 (45mts) episodes Tele Drama, An adaptation of Anton Chekhov's Lady with the Dog for National TV
- 1992 Kadulla-The Hurdle-21 (26 mts) episodes, Tele Drama, Won 9 UNDA international awards (Sri Lanka Office) Including Best TV Feature, Best Director, Best Script, Best Male and Female Performances, of the year 1992
- 1993 Suba Anagathyak-16 (26mts) episodes, Tele Drama, An Adaptation of Charles Dicken's Great Expectations for National TV
- 1994 Nadunana Puttu- Unknown Sons,21 (26mts) episodes, Tele Drama, for ITN
- 1996 Durganthaya- 34 (26mts) episodes, Tele Drama, An adaptation of Emily Brontë's Wuthering Heights
- 2009 Kampitha Vil

== Publications ==
- struggle between the form and the content of Sinhalese theatre(Sinhala Naatye Aakruthiyahaa Anthargathayaathara Aragalaya), 2017
- Kora Saha Andaya and vangagiriya, original plays, 2017
- Putu, Sinhala translation of a play by Eugene Ionesco, 2017
- Pedro paramo, translation of a novel, 2012
