= Frans Weisz =

Dutch film director (1938–2025

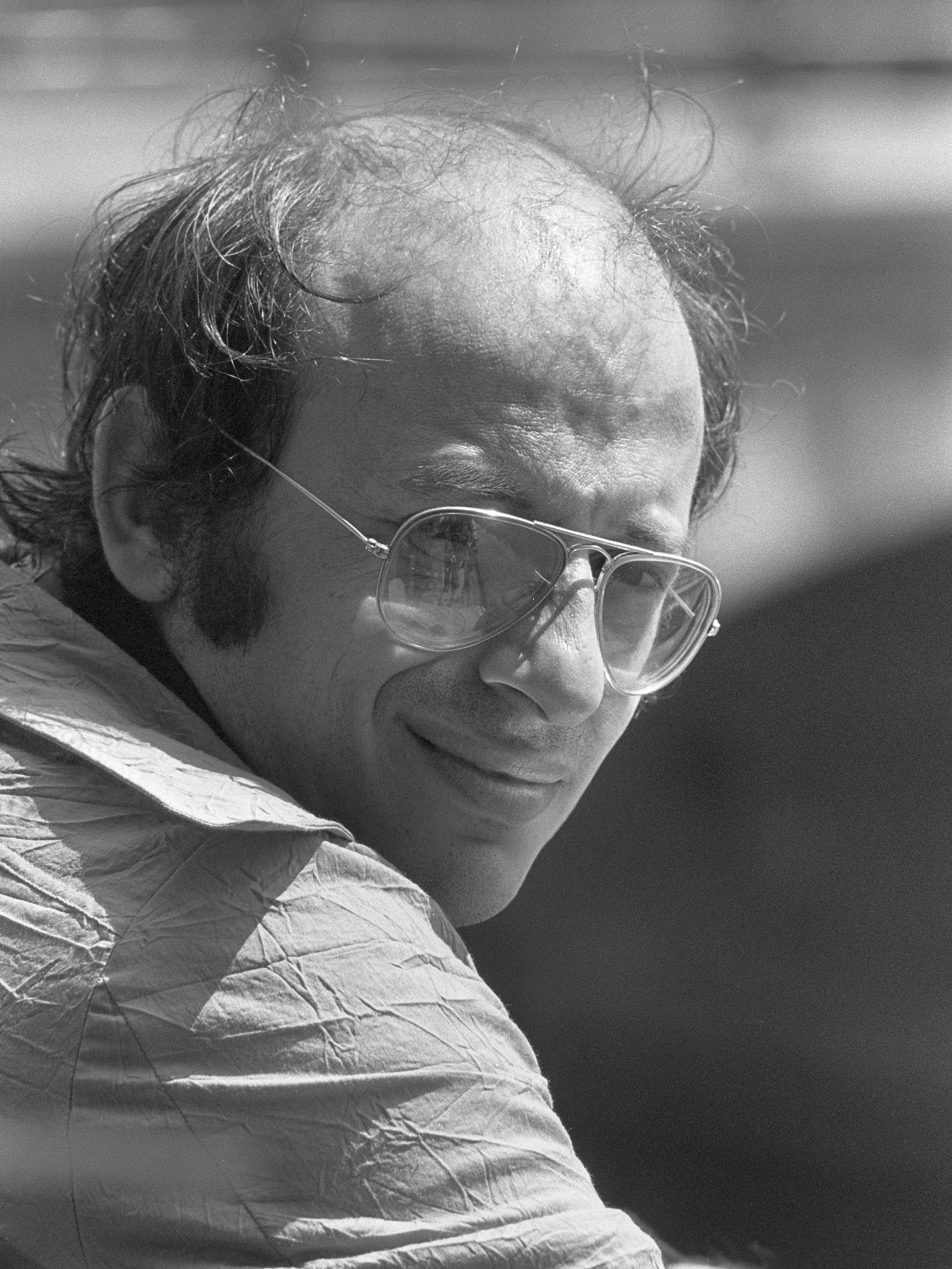
- Weisz in 1973
- Born: 23 July 1938; Amsterdam, Netherlands
- Died: 7 December 2025 (aged 87)
- Occupation: Film director
- Years active: 1964–2020
- Children: 1

Frans Weisz (23 July 1938 – 7 December 2025) was a Dutch film director. He directed more than 30 films since 1964. His 1975 film Red Sien was entered into the 9th Moscow International Film Festival. His film Havinck was screened in the Un Certain Regard section of the 1988 Cannes Film Festival. His 1993 film The Betrayed was entered into the 43rd Berlin International Film Festival.

Weisz was Jewish. During World War II, he hid with his parents on a farm in Limburg. When his family was discovered, Weisz managed to escape, but his parents were captured and transported to Auschwitz concentration camp. His mother survived, while his father died.

Weisz died of complications from Alzheimer's disease on 7 December 2025, at the age of 87.

== Selected filmography ==
- A Gangstergirl (1966)
- The Burglar (1972)
- Red Sien (1975)
- Charlotte (1981)
- Havinck (1987)
- Leedvermaak (1989)
- The Betrayed (1993)
- Last Call (1995)
- Boy Ecury (2003)
- Life Is Wonderful (2018)

== Awards ==
- 2018 - ShortCutz Amsterdam Career Award
